= Ignite Hong Kong - Awakening the Public march =

2019 protest march in Hong Kong, against the extradition bill

"Ignite Hong Kong - Awakening the Public" March
- Part of 2019–2020 Hong Kong protests
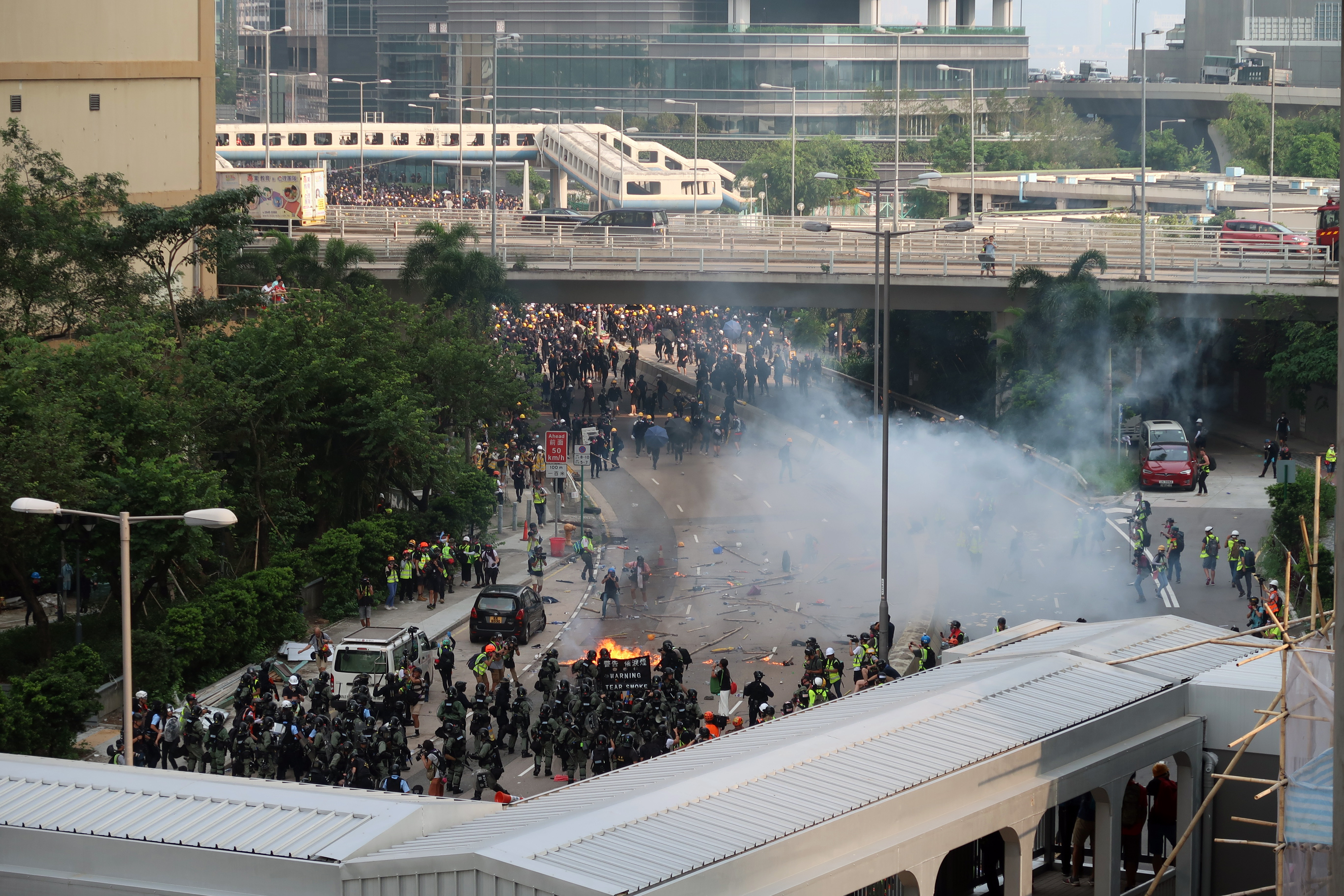
- Riot police firing tear gas to disperse protesters on Wai Yip Street in Kowloon Bay
- Date: August 24, 2019
- Location: Kwun Tong, Hong Kong
- Goals: Genuine universal suffrage by 2020; Release of arrested protesters with a commitment to no prosecution; Establishment of an internationally recognized independent inquiry committee to investigate police-protester conflicts and the Yuen Long attack; Repeal the labeling of the June 12 police-protester clash as a "riot"; Formal withdrawal of the Extradition Bill in accordance with legislative procedures; Address privacy and surveillance concerns regarding smart lampposts
- Methods: March; Flash occupations; Police-protester clashes
- Result: Protesters split into multiple groups, demonstrating in Kowloon Bay, Wong Tai Sin, Kwun Tong, and affected highways; Police sealed off Wong Tai Sin and Kowloon Bay, conducting sweeps at night to disperse protesters using tear gas, rubber bullets, pepper balls, and sponge grenades; the Raptor Squad and riot police arrested protesters; Protesters engaged in skirmishes with police, including flash occupations of highways and attempted raids on police stations; protesters set up roadblocks with debris, attacked police with slingshots, arson, bricks, and Molotov cocktails; Most smart lampposts around Zero Carbon Park were damaged by protesters, with maintenance hatches blocked, wires cut, or graffiti applied; some were sawed down with electric saws; public facilities in the conflict zone were repurposed as roadblocks; The government and police refused to meet any of the protesters' demands

Parties
Ventus Lau; Protesters; Regent Gardens residents; Wong Tai Sin residents; Some Sham Shui Po residents	Government of Hong Kong; Hong Kong Police Force; MTR Corporation; Regent Gardens management; Some Sham Shui Po residents

Casualties
- Arrested: 29

Ignite Hong Kong - Awakening the Public March was a protest march held on August 24, 2019, in Kwun Tong District, Hong Kong, as part of the anti-extradition bill protests. The march started at Tsun Yip Street Playground and ended at Zero Carbon Park in Kowloon Bay. Its objectives were to demand that the Hong Kong government address the five demands and raise concerns about smart lampposts installed in Kwun Tong and Kowloon Bay, which were perceived as a threat to personal privacy.

This was the first anti-extradition bill march held in Kwun Tong District since the introduction of the Extradition Bill. To obtain a "Letter of No Objection" from the police, the march route was significantly altered, changing the endpoint from Kwun Tong Swimming Pool to Zero Carbon Park in Kowloon Bay.

During the march, protesters toppled smart lampposts and surrounded Ngau Tau Kok Police Station. The event escalated into clashes with police, which spread to Wong Tai Sin and Sham Shui Po. The organizer, Ventus Lau, and 16 other volunteers were arrested after the march.

== Background ==
=== Demand for government response to five demands ===
In 2019, Hong Kong saw widespread protests against the proposed extradition bill. This march was one of the events opposing the bill, with participants demanding that the government address the five demands. These demands were:

- Complete withdrawal of the Extradition Bill
- Retract the government's classification of the June 12 police-protester clash as a "riot"
- Drop all charges against anti-extradition protesters
- Establish an independent inquiry into alleged police misconduct
- Implement genuine universal suffrage

The organizers criticized the government for using "rhetorical tactics" to evade addressing the five demands. They aimed to make protests "blossom everywhere" to raise awareness about the extradition bill and push for government action.

=== Smart lampposts ===
The Hong Kong government was implementing a trial program for "multifunctional smart lampposts," planning to install around 400 across the city. Kwun Tong District was the first area to receive 50 such lampposts, equipped with features for traffic snapshots, weather data collection, and air quality monitoring.

However, the smart lampposts raised concerns about privacy and surveillance, with fears that they could use facial recognition technology to monitor citizens for law enforcement purposes.

The organizers aimed to raise awareness about the issues surrounding smart lampposts while "protecting Hong Kong's remaining democratic freedoms." They also criticized the government for installing the lampposts without prior consultation.

== March route ==
On August 15, the organizers announced that the march would begin at 1:00 PM from Tsun Yip Street Playground and end at an open area outside Kwun Tong Swimming Pool.

On August 19, the march applicant Ventus Lau met with police, who raised concerns about the route, such as its potential to disrupt bus services. Lau accused the police of deliberately obstructing the organizers but agreed to cooperate to secure the Letter of No Objection.

On August 22, Ventus Lau announced that the police had issued the Letter of No Objection, with the march permitted until 7:00 PM and an expected attendance of 4,000. However, the endpoint was changed to Zero Carbon Park. Lau described the change as "bowing to authority" for a legal and safe march, criticizing the police for making "political judgments." He noted that many netizens preferred a route along the busier Kwun Tong Road and described the approved route as "not ideal," acknowledging the difficulty in preventing participants from deviating.

== March process ==
=== Before the march ===
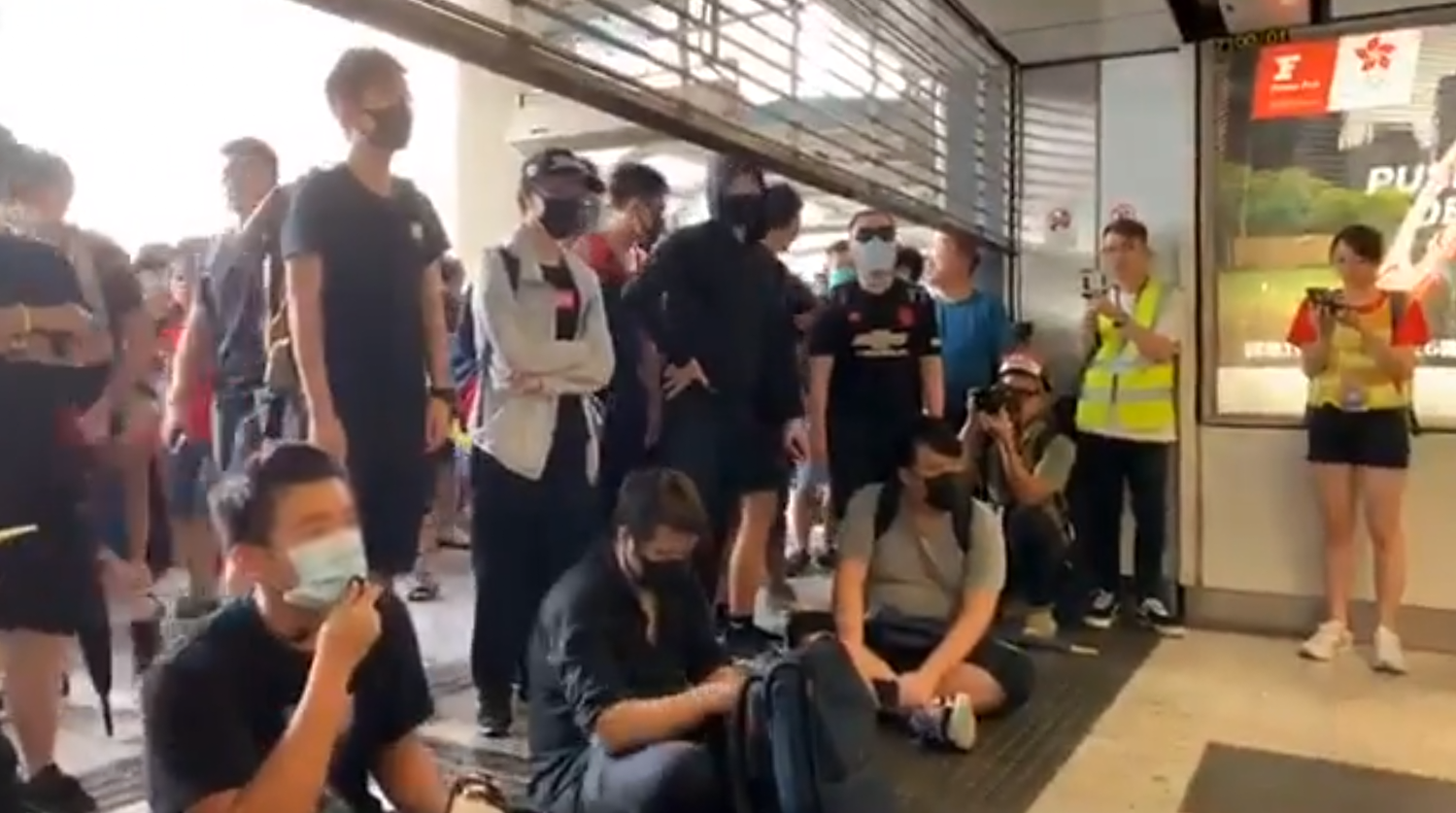
Citizens sitting or standing at the gate of Kwun Tong Station Exit A to prevent MTR from closing the gates

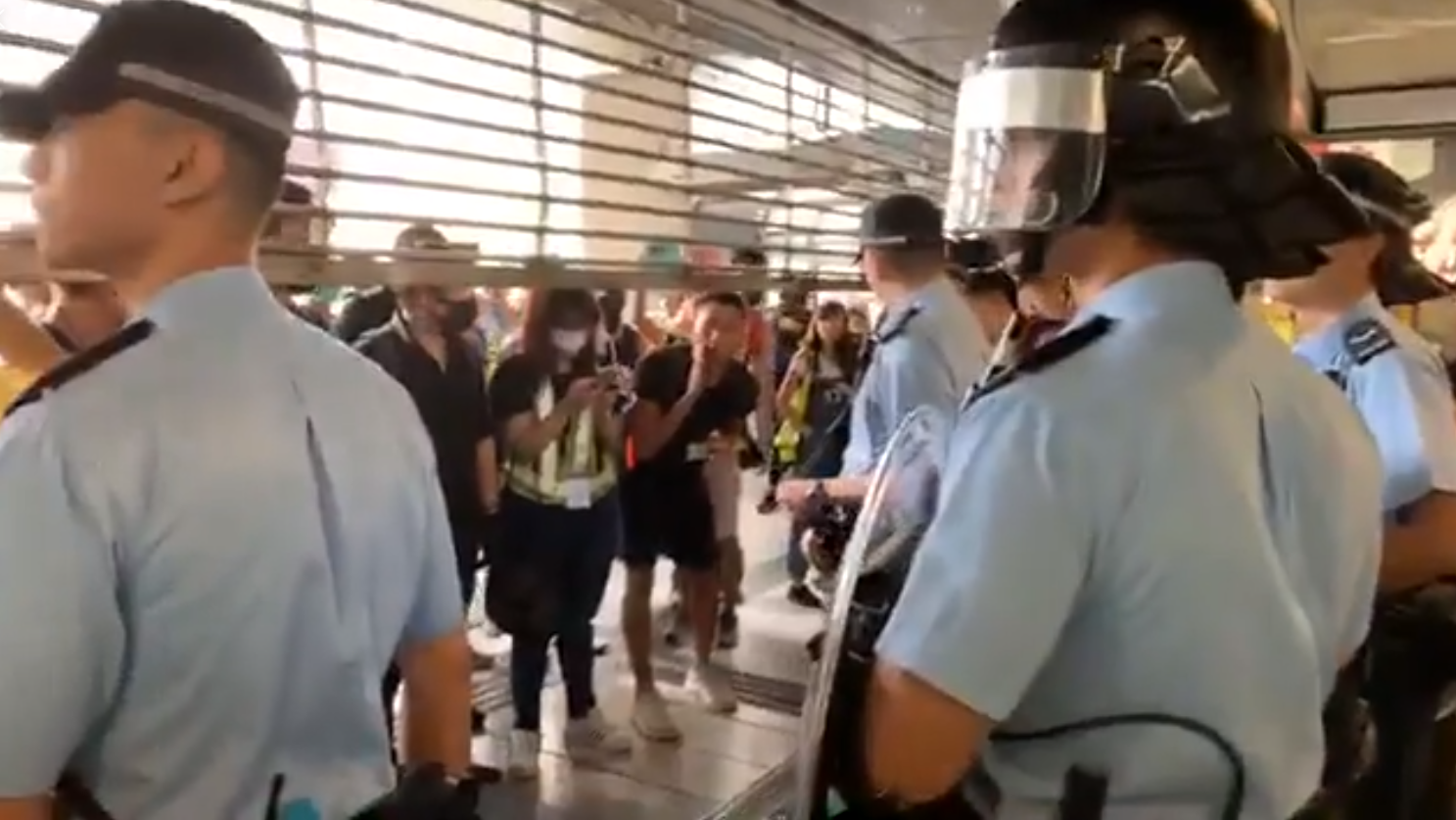
MTR staff closing the gates at Kwun Tong Station, with police on standby

Around 9:00 AM, according to HK01 reporters, the march route area was calm. At Ngau Tau Kok Police Station, 800 meters from the march route on Wang Chiu Road, the parking lot gate and disabled entrance were boarded up, preventing outside observation. Outdoor areas were covered with blue tarps, and barricades were placed along Hoi Bun Road, with security patrols. By 10:00 AM, over 10 police vehicles left the station, and around 20 officers with warning flags and other equipment entered to prepare.

At 10:30 AM, MTR Corporation announced that services on the Kwun Tong Line from Choi Hung Station to Tiu Keng Leng Station would be suspended from noon, with Kowloon Bay Station to Lam Tin Station closed. By noon, many citizens were waiting at Yan Oi Court Bus Terminus and the taxi stand at apm mall. Near the starting point, Tsun Yip Street Market had few shops open, but one, "Tucheng Japanese Cuisine," set up a rest station with banners offering free water and food for marchers.

By 11:00 AM, Kwun Tong Station staff were maintaining order, and many shops in the station began closing their shutters. At noon, all ticket gates at Kwun Tong Station were closed, surprising some citizens who could not enter. By 12:30 PM, many lingered in the station, with some writing complaints and posting them on the customer service center's glass, others asking about shuttle bus arrangements, and some demanding explanations for the gate closures. A large group sat or stood at Exit A to prevent MTR from closing the gates. Uniformed police were present in the station's control center. HK01 reported citizens criticizing MTR, saying, "All you know is how to raise fares, what else can you do?" and "If you close all the gates, how will residents get home?" The station manager did not respond to questions, only reiterating the closure arrangements. At 1:48 PM, over a dozen uniformed officers with round shields arrived at Kwun Tong Station. Citizens retreated, and MTR staff closed the gates. Some shouted slogans like "corrupt police, return our eyes" and "triads." By 2:15 PM, citizens began leaving Exit A.

=== During the march ===
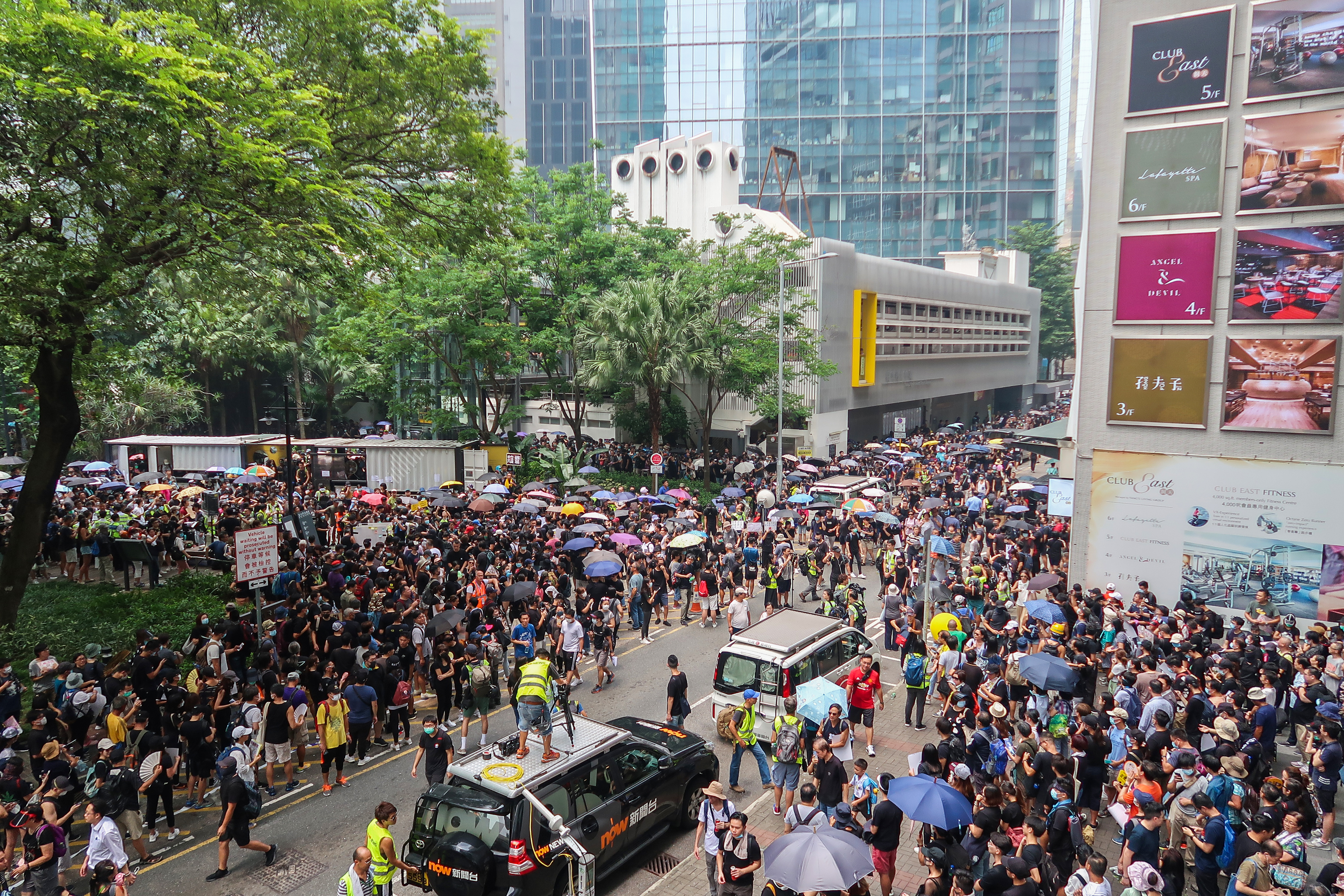
A large crowd gathers at Tsun Yip Street Playground, with Tsun Yip Street filled with protesters

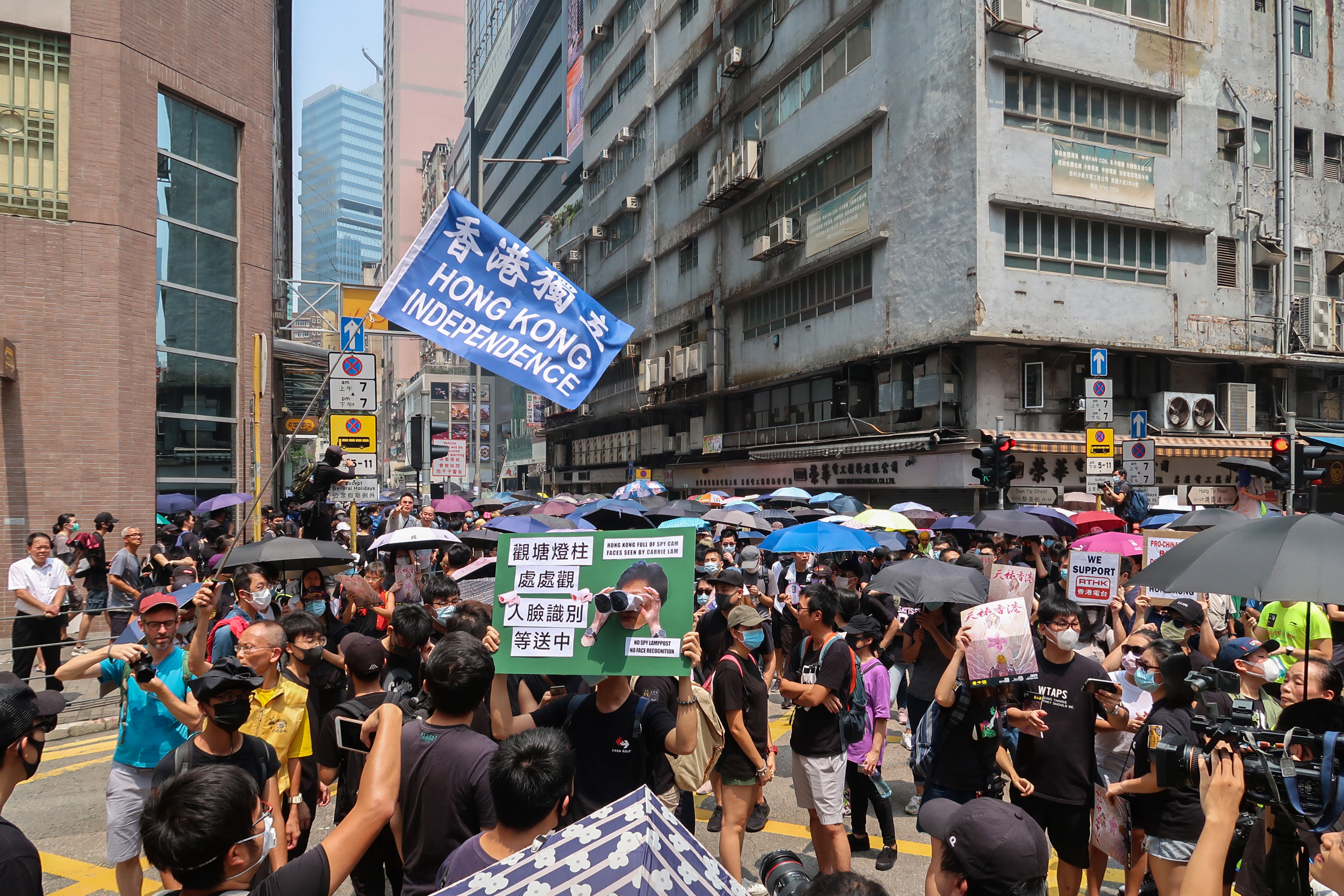
Citizens holding signs reading "Facial recognition equals extradition" and Hong Kong independence flags

At 1:00 PM, citizens gathered at Tsun Yip Street Playground, filling the area. March applicant Ventus Lau spoke to the media, criticizing the government and MTR for "colluding to suppress citizens' right to assemble, effectively obstructing their activities." He called MTR's actions "unprecedented and unreasonable," suggesting they might encourage more participation. By 1:20 PM, due to the large crowd, some participants began marching on their own. The march officially started at 1:30 PM.

The march passed through Kwun Tong streets like Hoi Bun Road, Wai Yip Street, and Sheung Yee Road. Ventus Lau led the procession with a vertical banner. Some held signs reading "Facial recognition equals extradition," while others covered their right eye to protest a female first-aider's permanent blindness caused by a police projectile during the August 11 march. Along the route, some distributed dried fruit from carts to encourage marchers. Slogans like "Liberate Hong Kong, revolution of our times" were chanted.

By 2:49 PM, the march's front reached Zero Carbon Park. Around 4:00 PM, many left the endpoint, with some heading via Telford Plaza to MTR headquarters. At 6:15 PM, the organizers announced the march's conclusion, urging participants to stay safe.

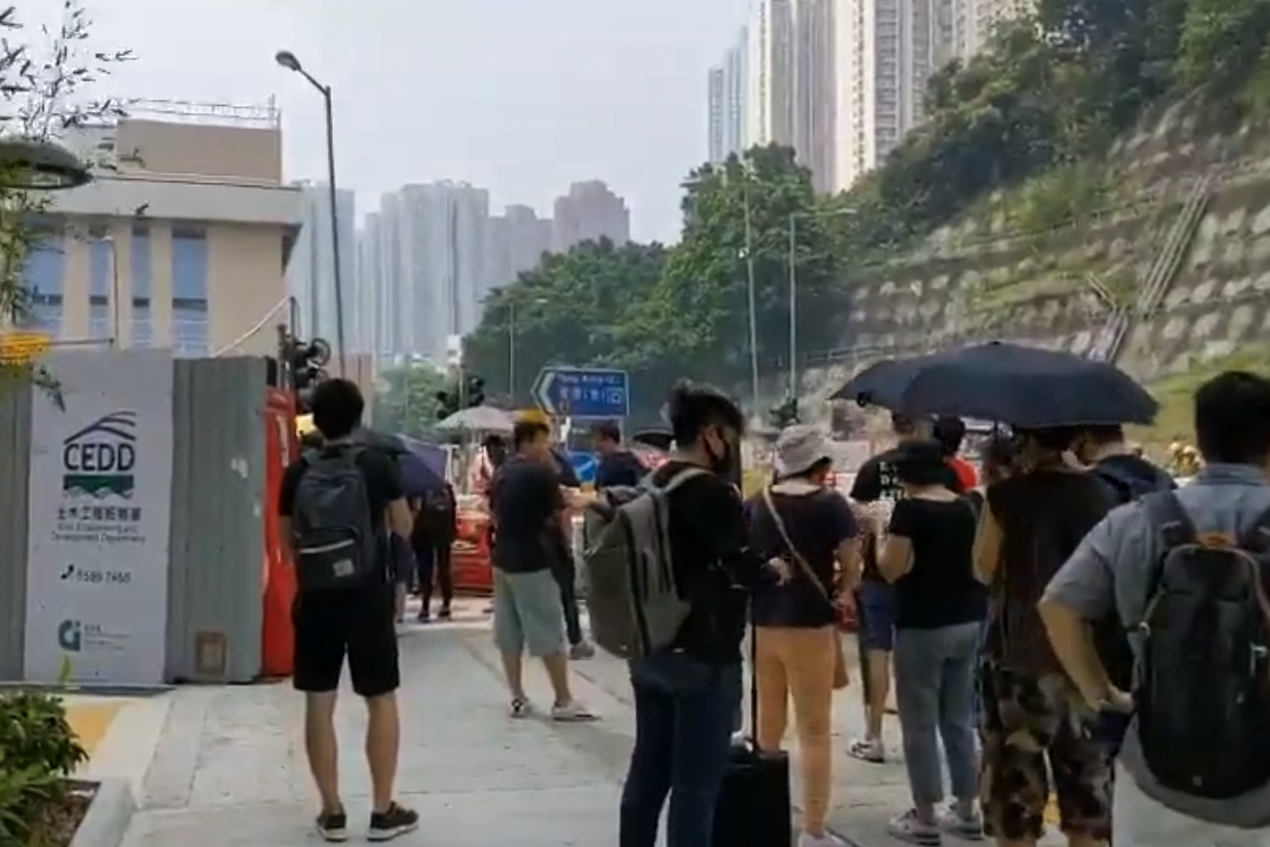
At 1:00 PM, citizens in black gathered at Yau Tong Station, walking to the Kwun Tong march starting point

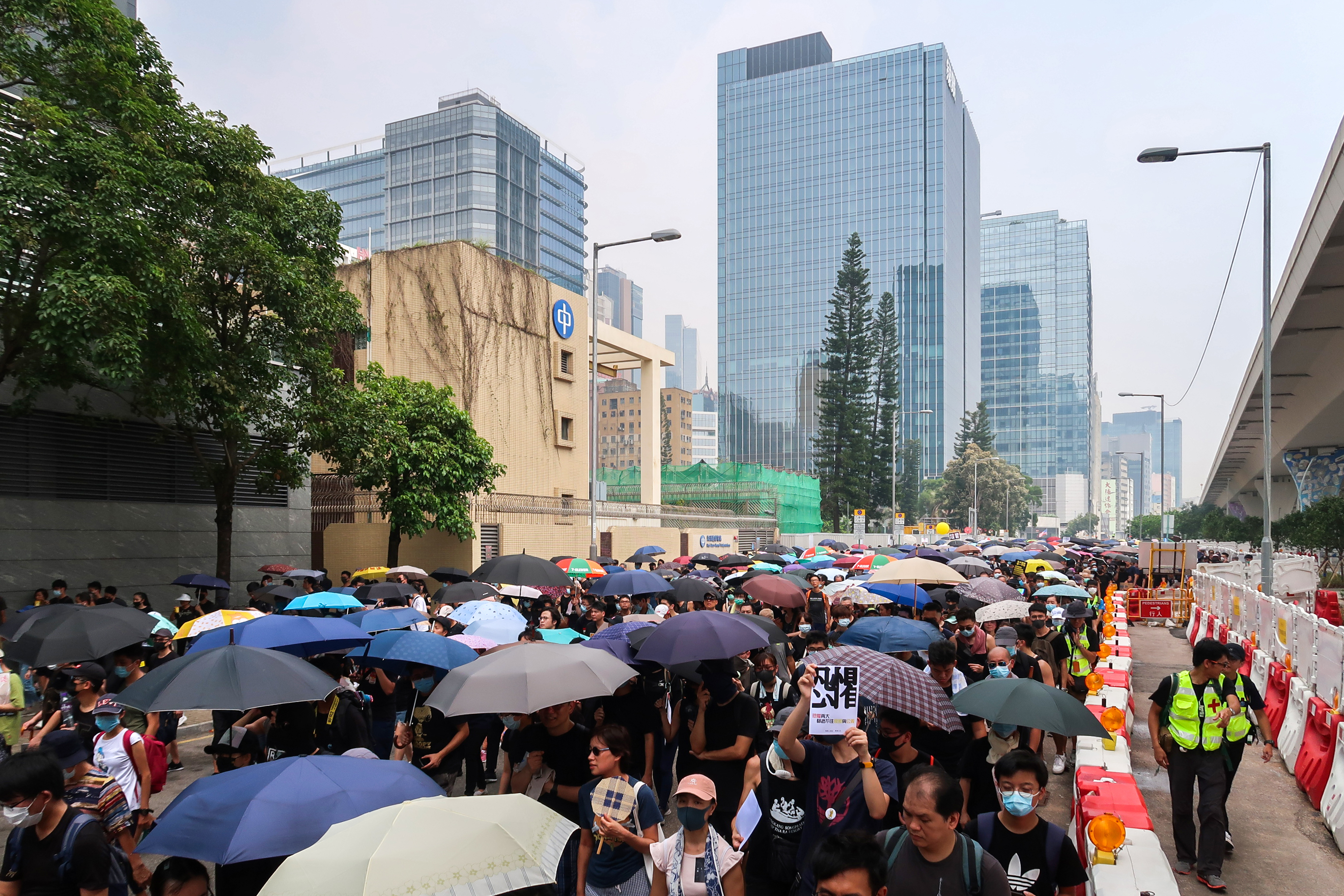
Marchers on Hoi Bun Road, many holding umbrellas to protest street surveillance

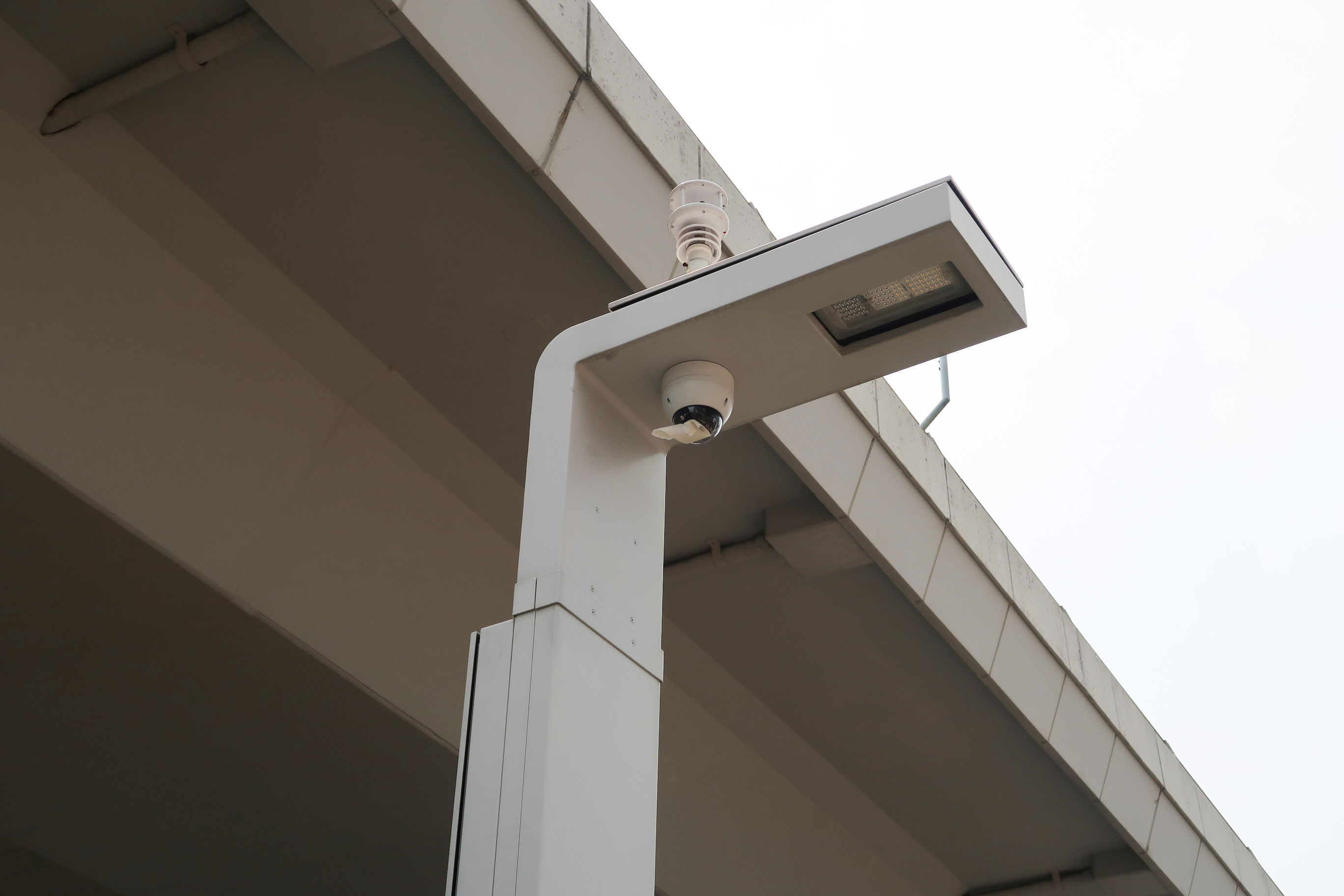
CCTV at the Energizing Kowloon East Office covered with stickers

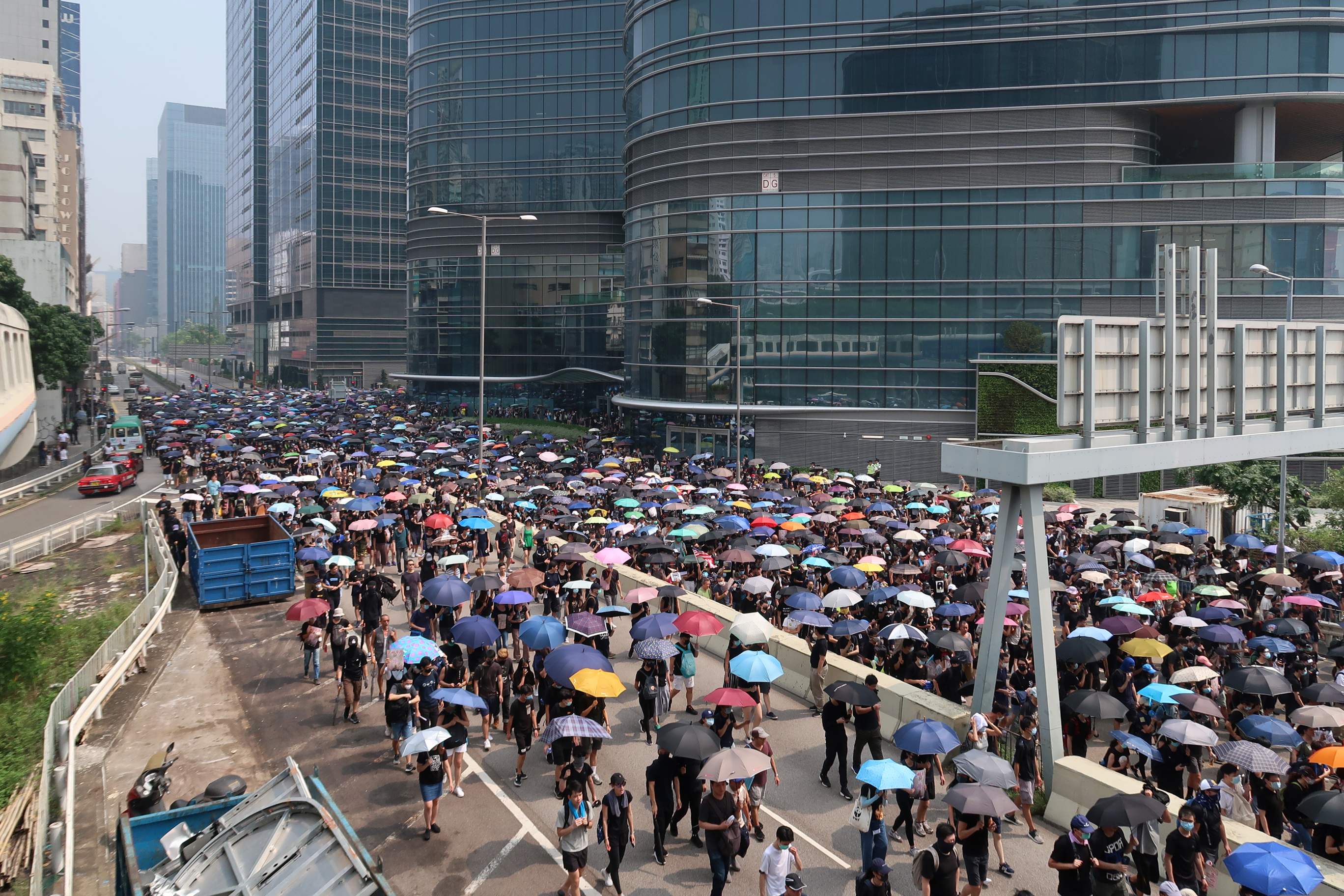
Both lanes of Wai Yip Street opposite Hoi Bun Road filled with marchers

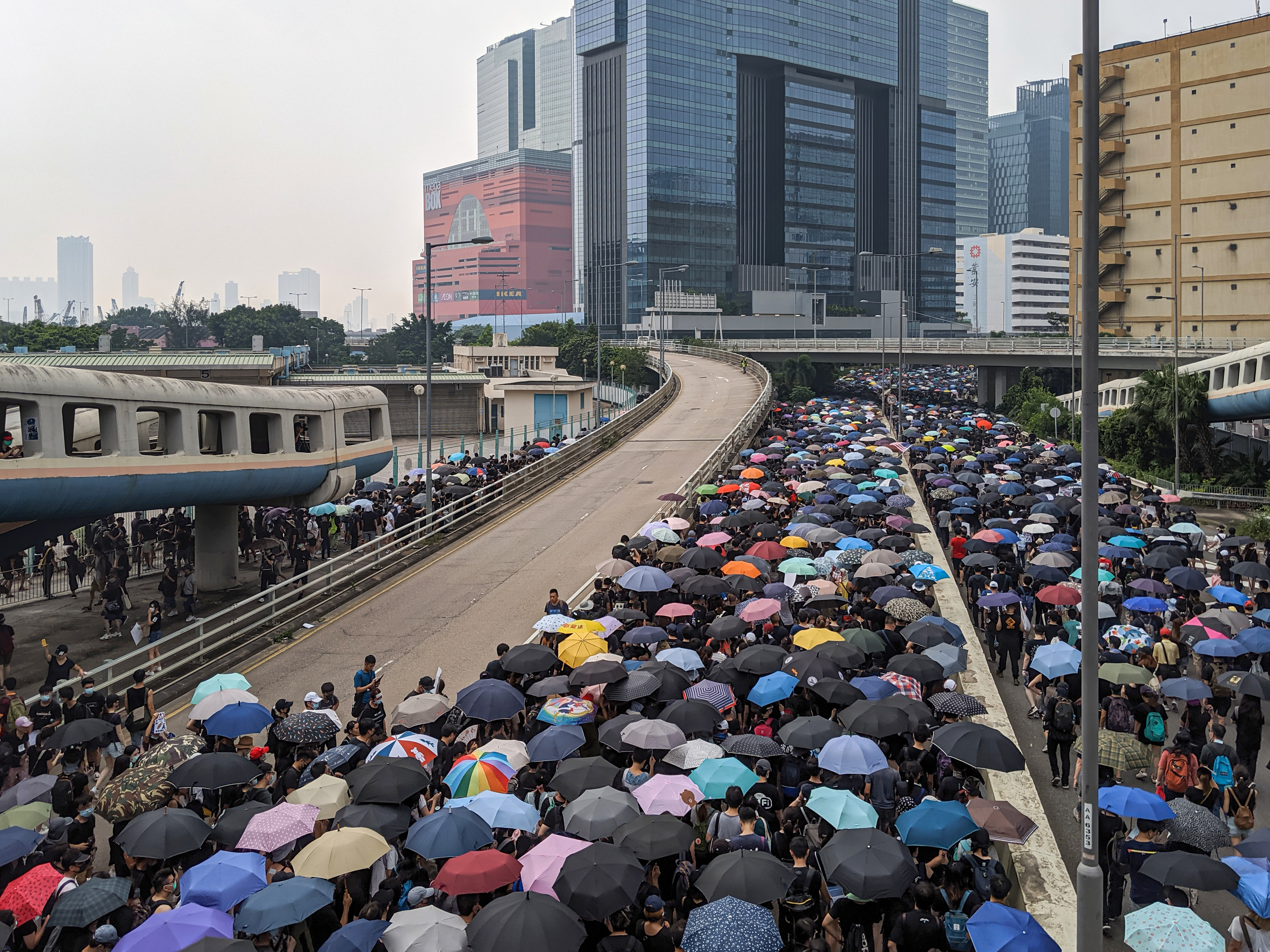
Marchers heading toward Kowloon Bay

==== Wai Yip Street standoff ====
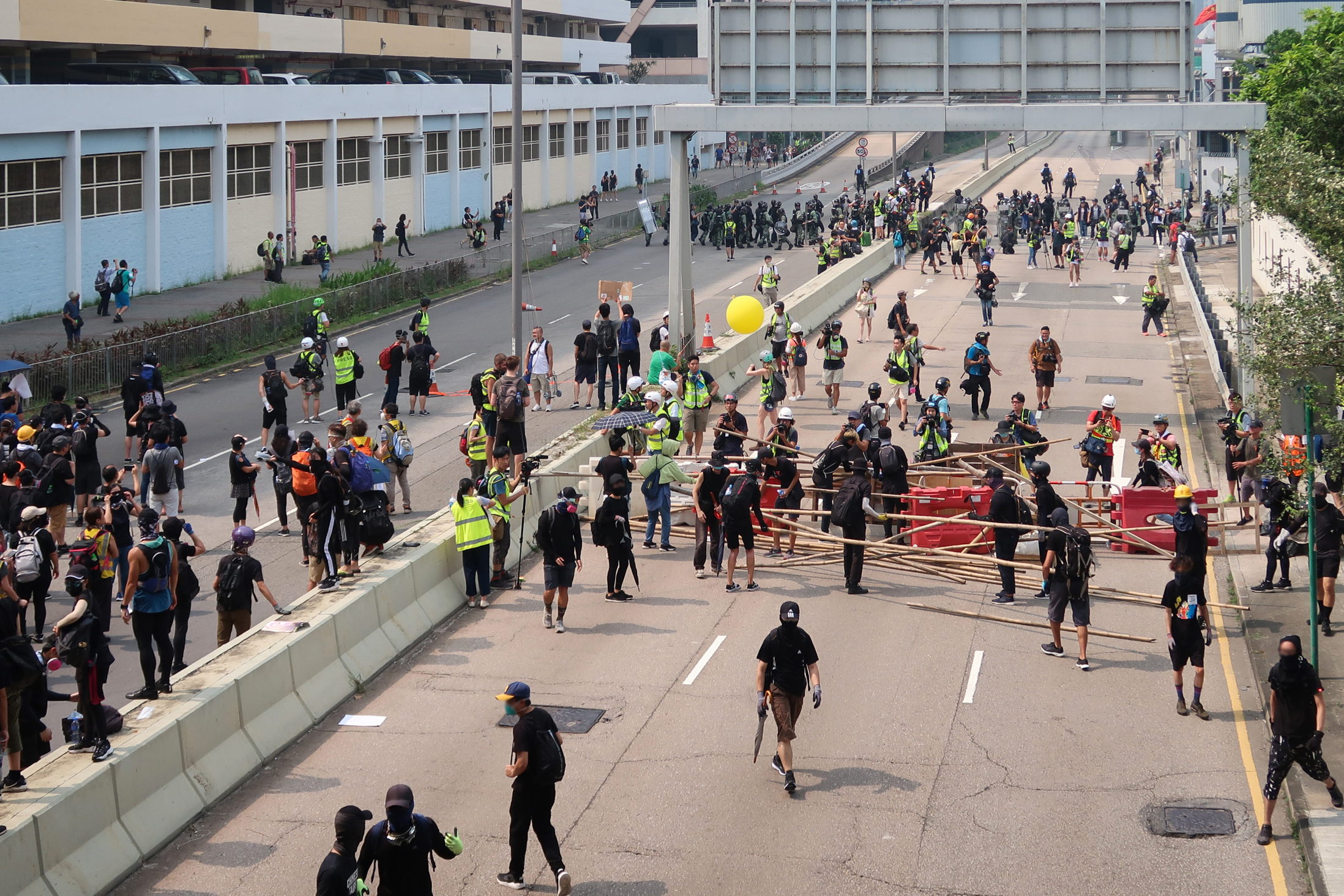
At 2:40 pm, protesters set up roadblocks in the middle of Wai Yip Street using bamboo scaffolding, water barriers, and metal railings

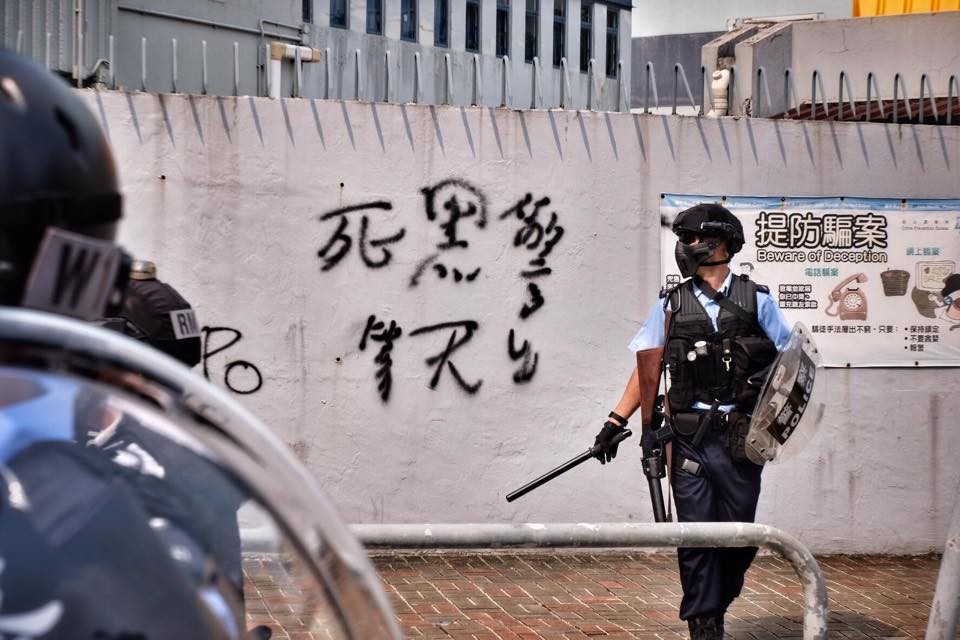
Protesters spray-painted "Dead Dark Cops" on the outer wall of Ngau Tau Kok Police Station

Around 2:30 pm, a group of Special Tactical Contingent (STS) members and riot police moved from Ngau Tau Kok Police Station to Wai Yip Street near Zero Carbon Park. Police and protesters faced off at a distance of about 20 meters. Some officers were equipped with Fabrique Nationale 303 rifles, commonly known as "big mouth guns," capable of firing rubber bullets and tear gas. Protesters set up roadblocks on Wai Yip Street using bamboo scaffolding, water barriers, and metal railings, with some in the front line holding up umbrellas. Meanwhile, protesters spray-painted slogans such as "Dark Cops" and "End Police Brutality" on the outer wall of Ngau Tau Kok Police Station. About ten minutes later, riot police retreated to Shiu Yip Street, raising a blue flag and urging protesters to "disperse immediately or face appropriate force." The Special Tactical Contingent commander told then-People Power chairman Raymond Chan and vice-chairman Tam Tak-chi that riot police would remain on standby and instructed marchers to follow the designated route. Tam repeatedly requested the commander not to use tear gas. By around 3:00 pm, riot police withdrew to Ngau Tau Kok Police Station, and protesters cheered and clapped.

==== Destruction of smart lampposts ====
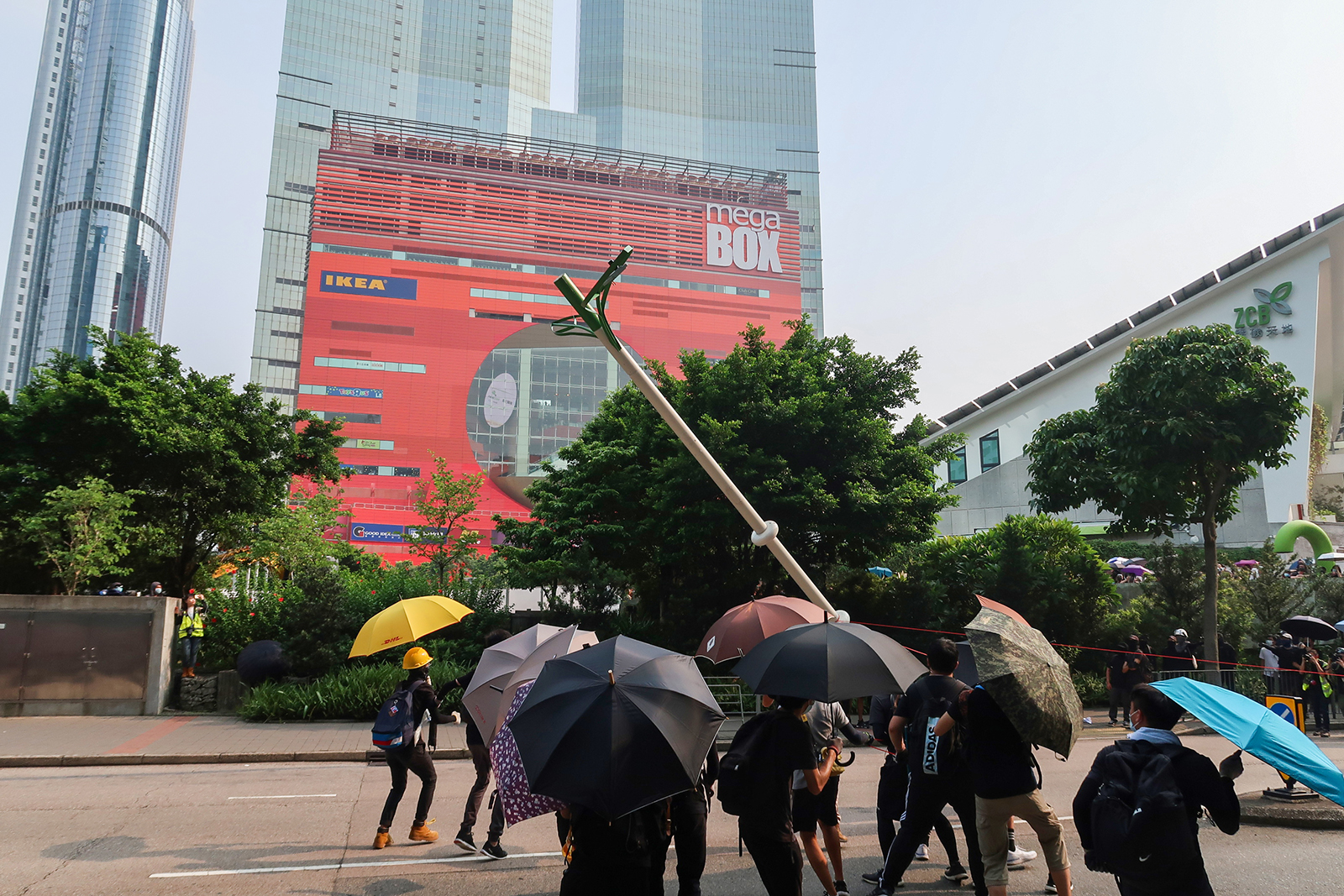
Protesters dismantle a smart lampposts outside Zero Carbon Park in Kowloon Bay

Around 2:00 pm, some marchers attempted to cover smart lampposts along the route with tape. At 3:06 pm, protesters dismantled the electrical box of a smart lamppost and used a handsaw to cut it down. They spray-painted "No Surveillance" on the lamppost, discarded its wires and components into a nearby drainage channel, and damaged at least five smart lampposts. Around 4:00 pm, protesters used a small electric saw to dismantle a smart lamppost on Sheung Yuet Road in Kowloon Bay. The lamppost's base components were exposed, and some were covered with plastic bags. Slogans such as "Resist Tyranny" and "Reject Authoritarian Surveillance" were attached to the lamppost, which was laid across the road as a barricade. Protesters examined the lamppost components and found a USB flash drive labeled "ble locater," which some speculated was a communication device between lampposts. The police later condemned the destruction of the smart lampposts and announced that Ngau Tau Kok Police Station's report room would temporarily suspend services.

==== Wai Yip Street clashes ====
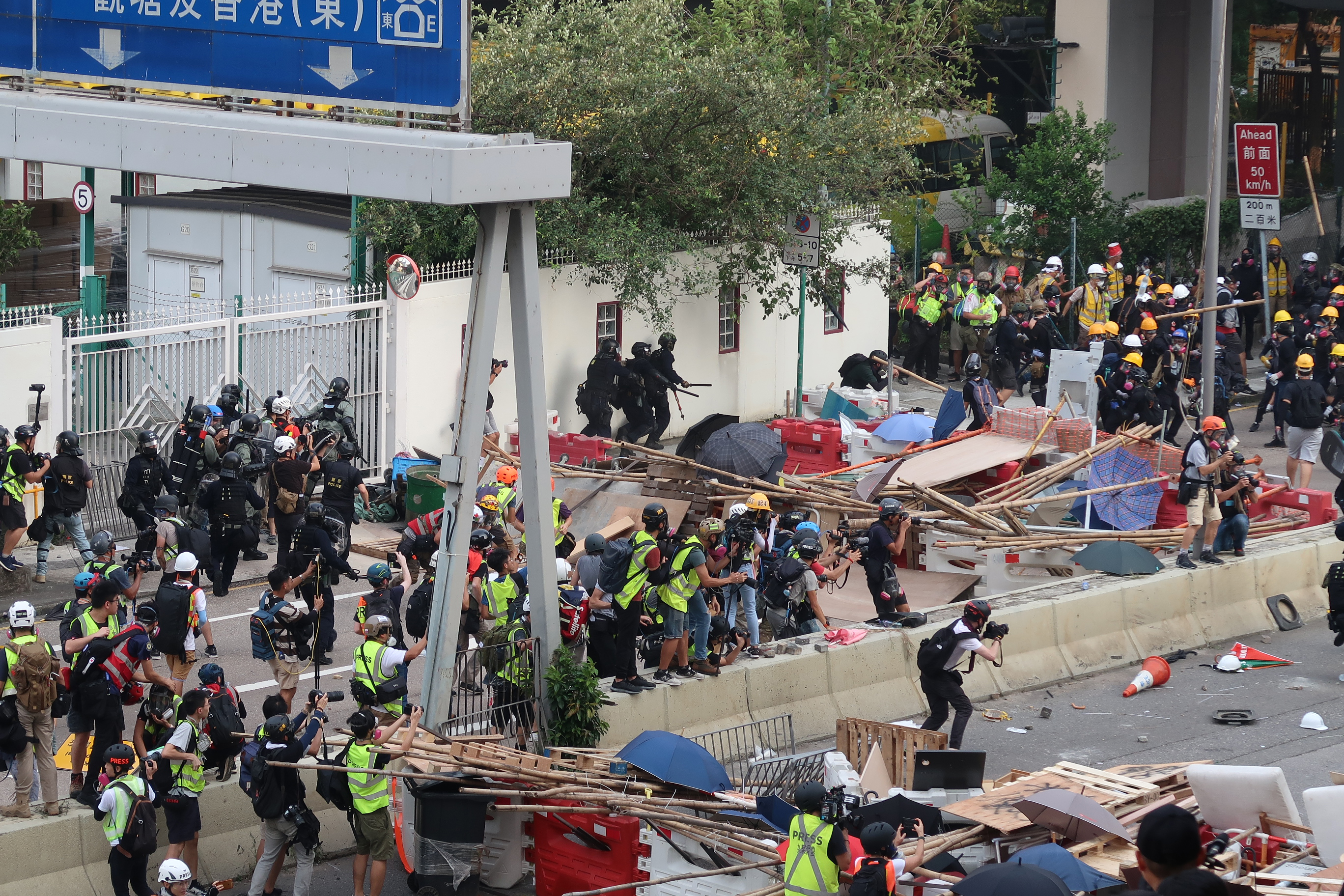
At 4:39 pm, Special Tactical Contingent suddenly charged at protesters and subdued several individuals

During the protest, some demonstrators gathered outside the Ngau Tau Kok Police Station on Wai Yip Street. The police displayed a red warning flag at one point. At 4:40 p.m., police reported that protesters threw bricks toward their position, prompting the use of at least five rounds of pepper-spray projectiles, sponge grenades, and smoke canisters. At 4:39 p.m., the Special Tactical Contingent charged at protesters, subduing several individuals. During the confrontation, some protesters threw objects at the police, with some fleeing toward the Kowloon Bay station Telford Plaza platform, while others headed toward Kwun Tong. Petrol bombs were thrown from both sides of Wai Yip Street, prompting police to retreat temporarily and raise a black warning flag, followed by the deployment of multiple tear gas canisters to disperse the crowd.

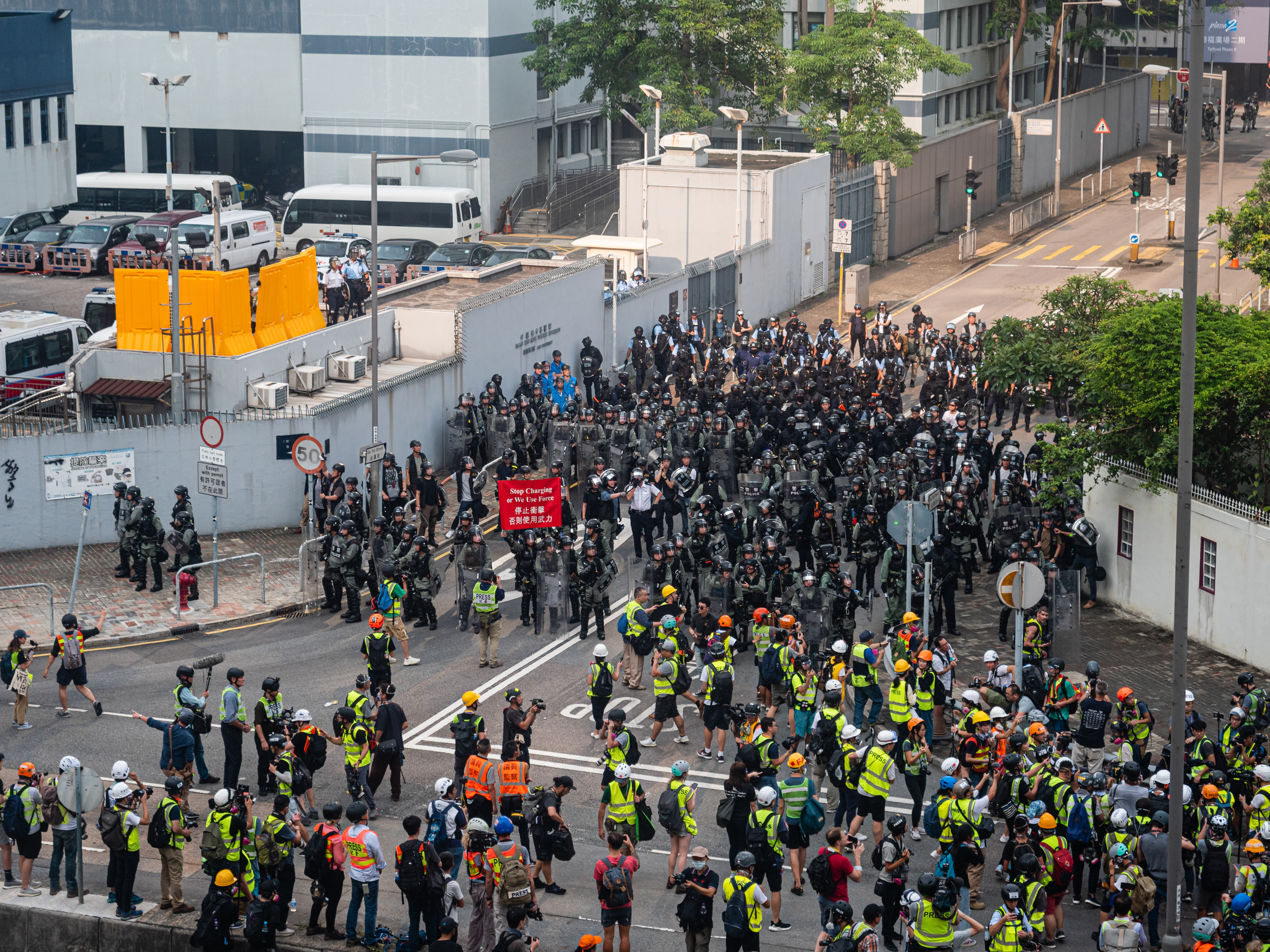
Large numbers of riot police and Special Tactical Contingent officers on alert on Wai Yip Street outside Ngau Tau Kok Police Station.

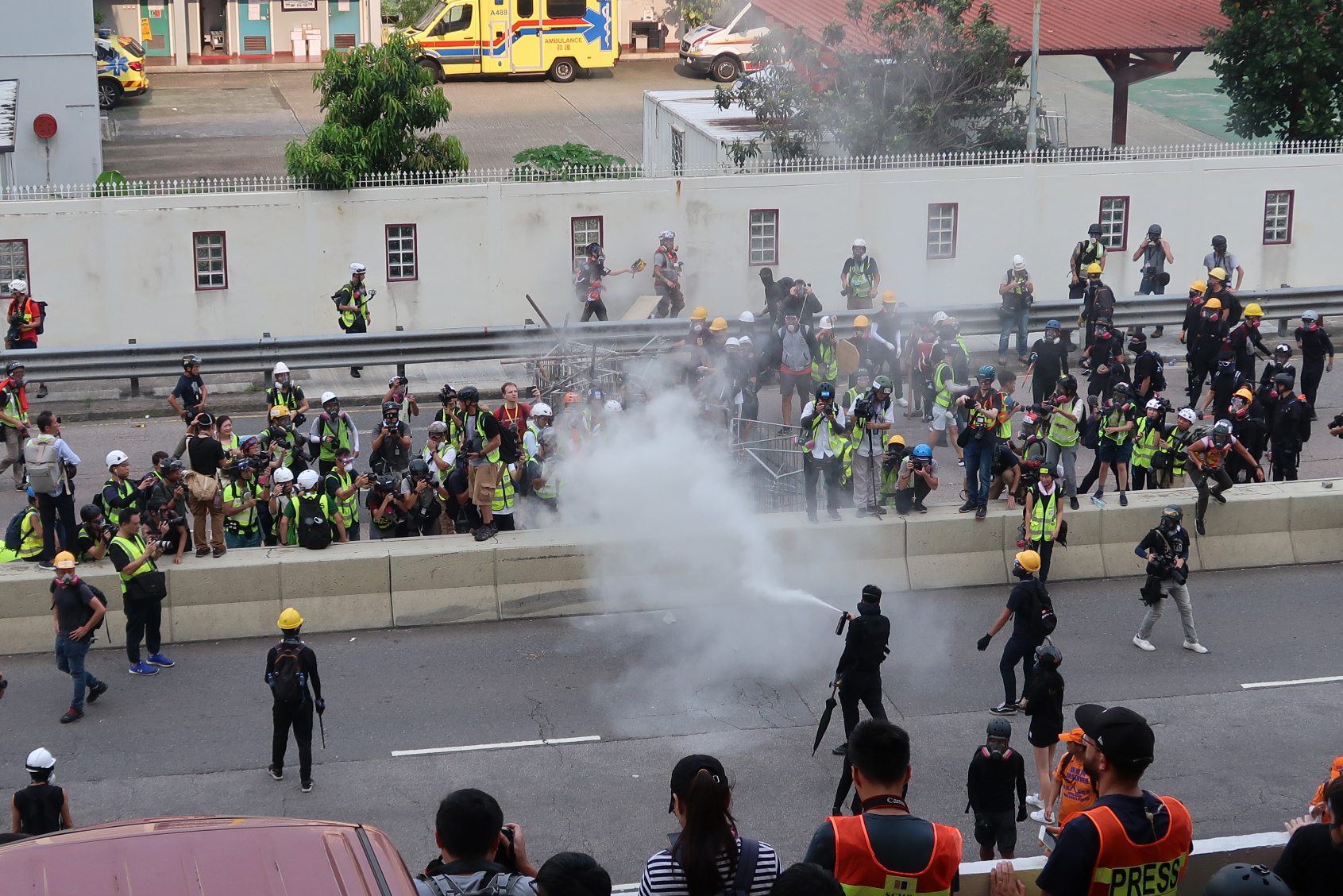
A protester sprays smoke toward journalists.

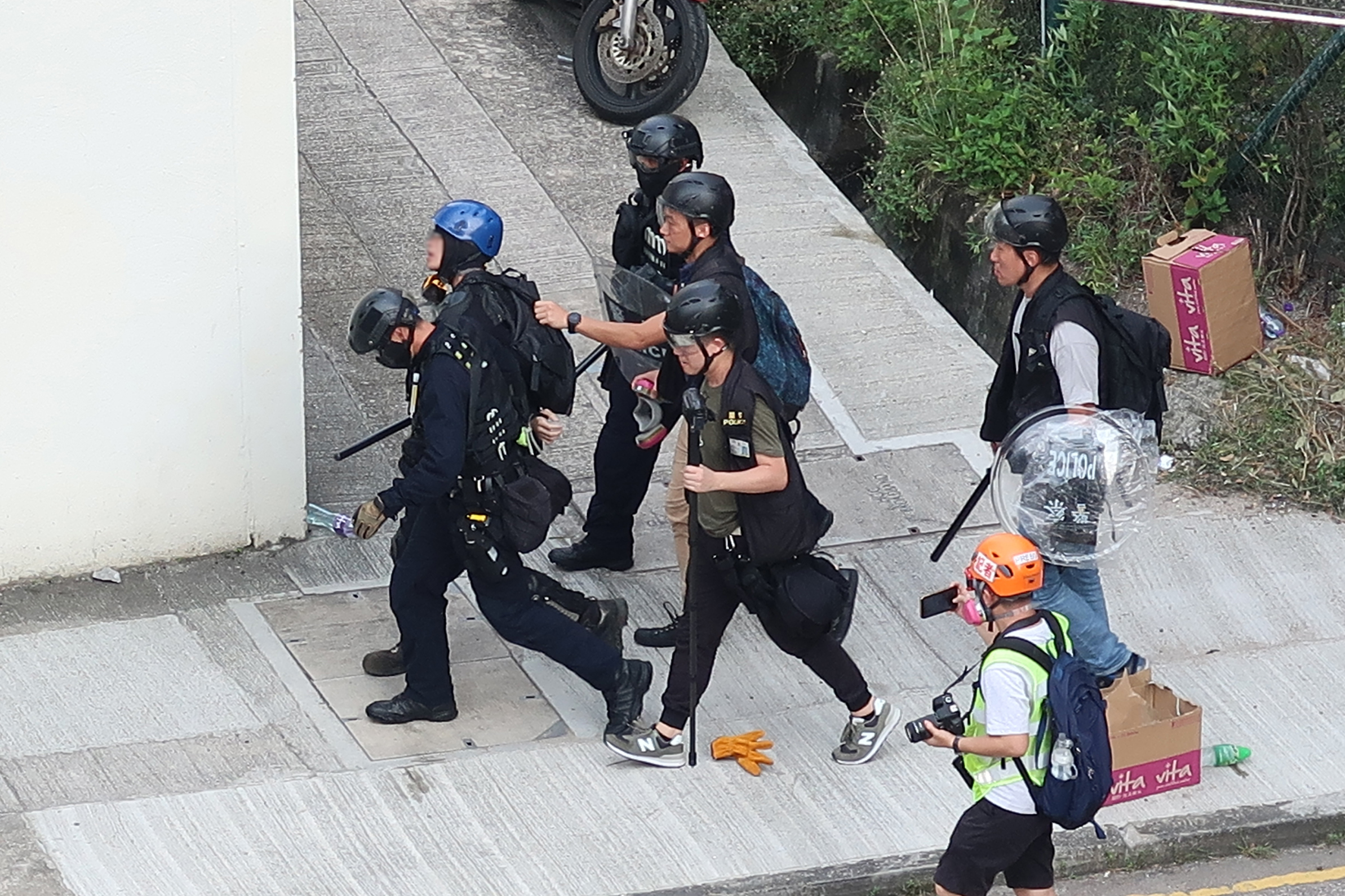
Protesters being subdued by police officers.

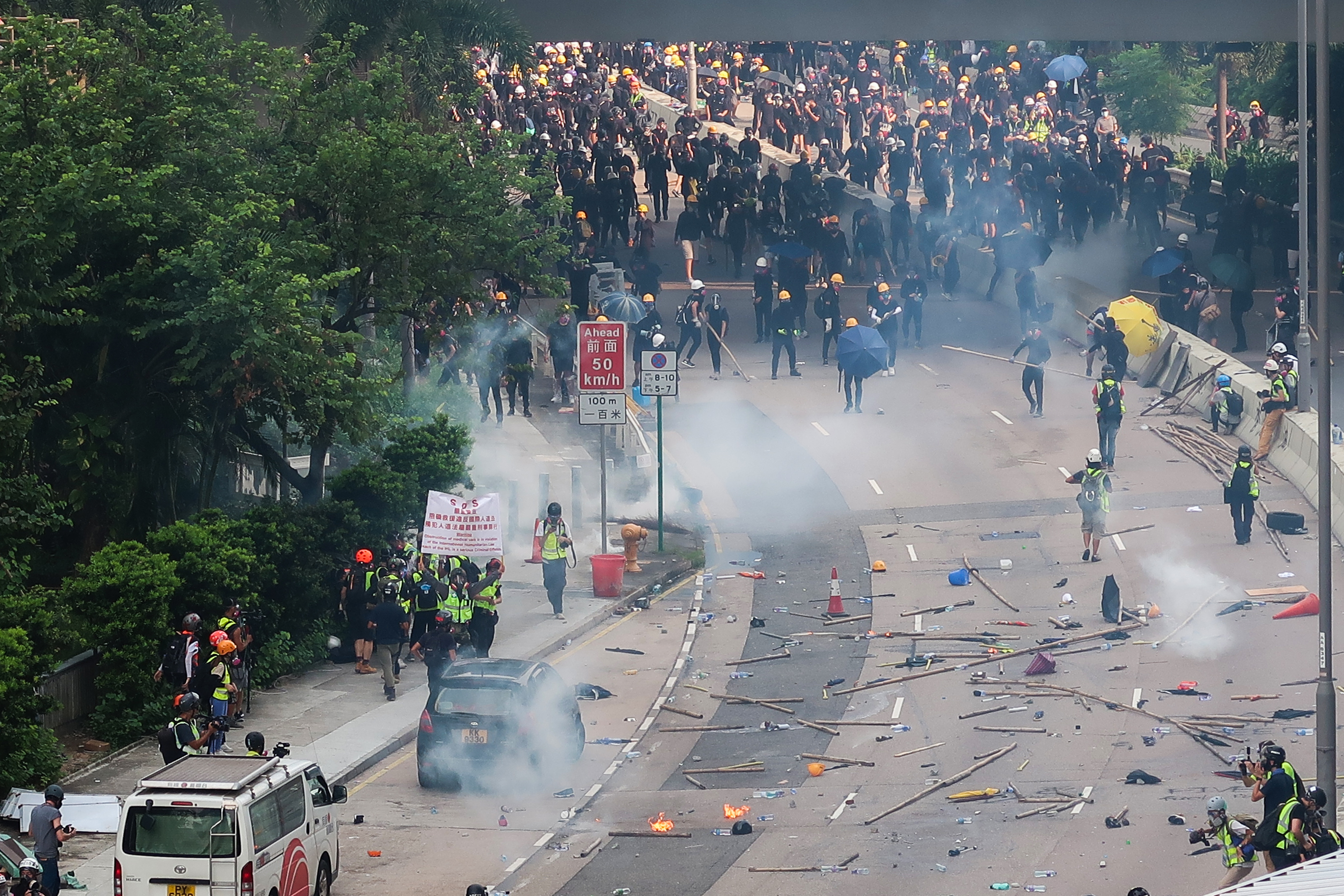
During the deployment of multiple tear gas canisters, a person raises an SOS white flag, criticizing police for obstructing rescue efforts in violation of international human rights law.

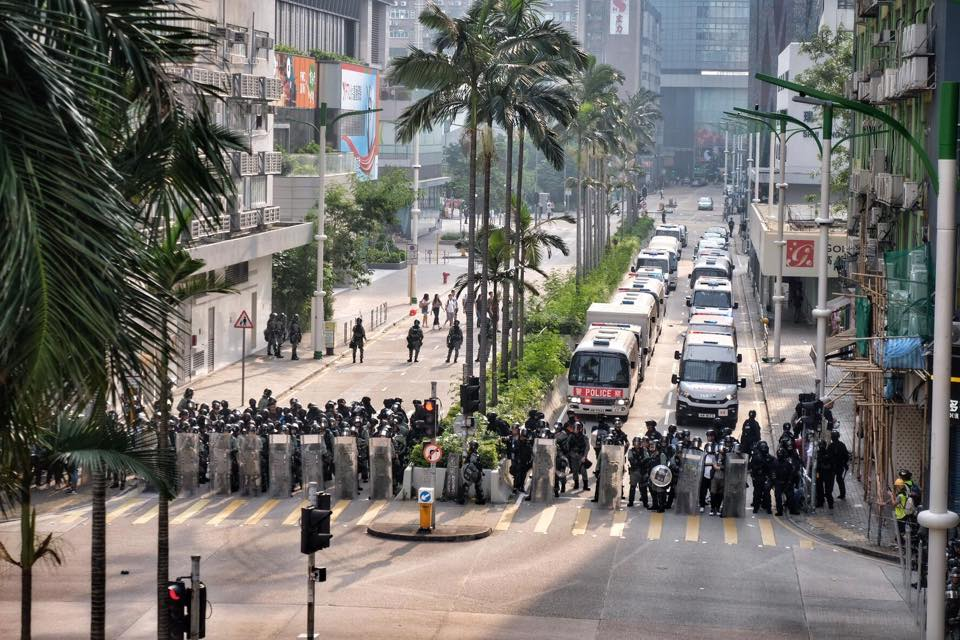
Large numbers of police officers and police vehicles deployed on Sheung Yuet Road.

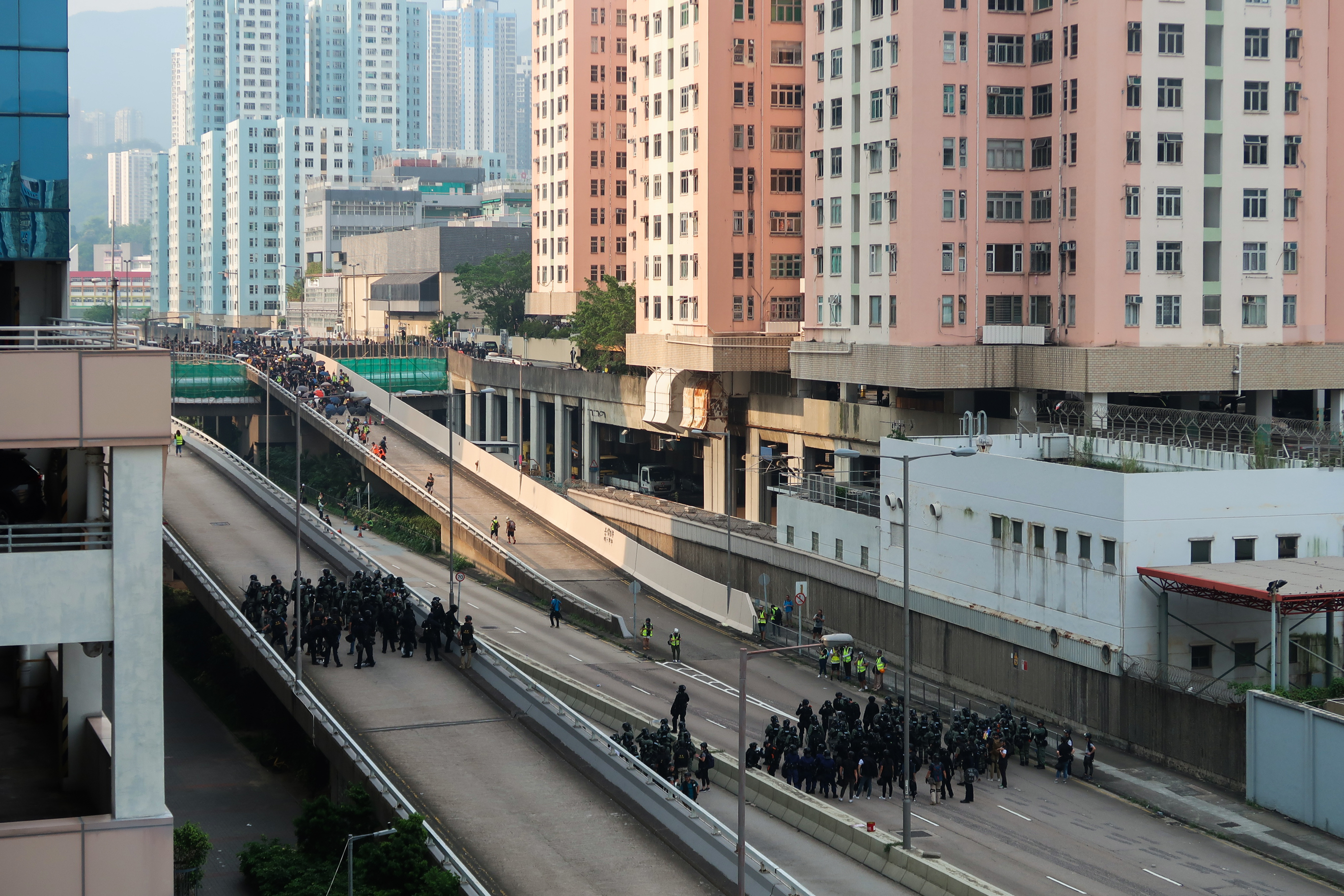
Protesters retreat toward Telford Plaza, while Special Tactical Contingent and riot police advance along Wai Yip Street.

==== Telford Plaza clashes ====
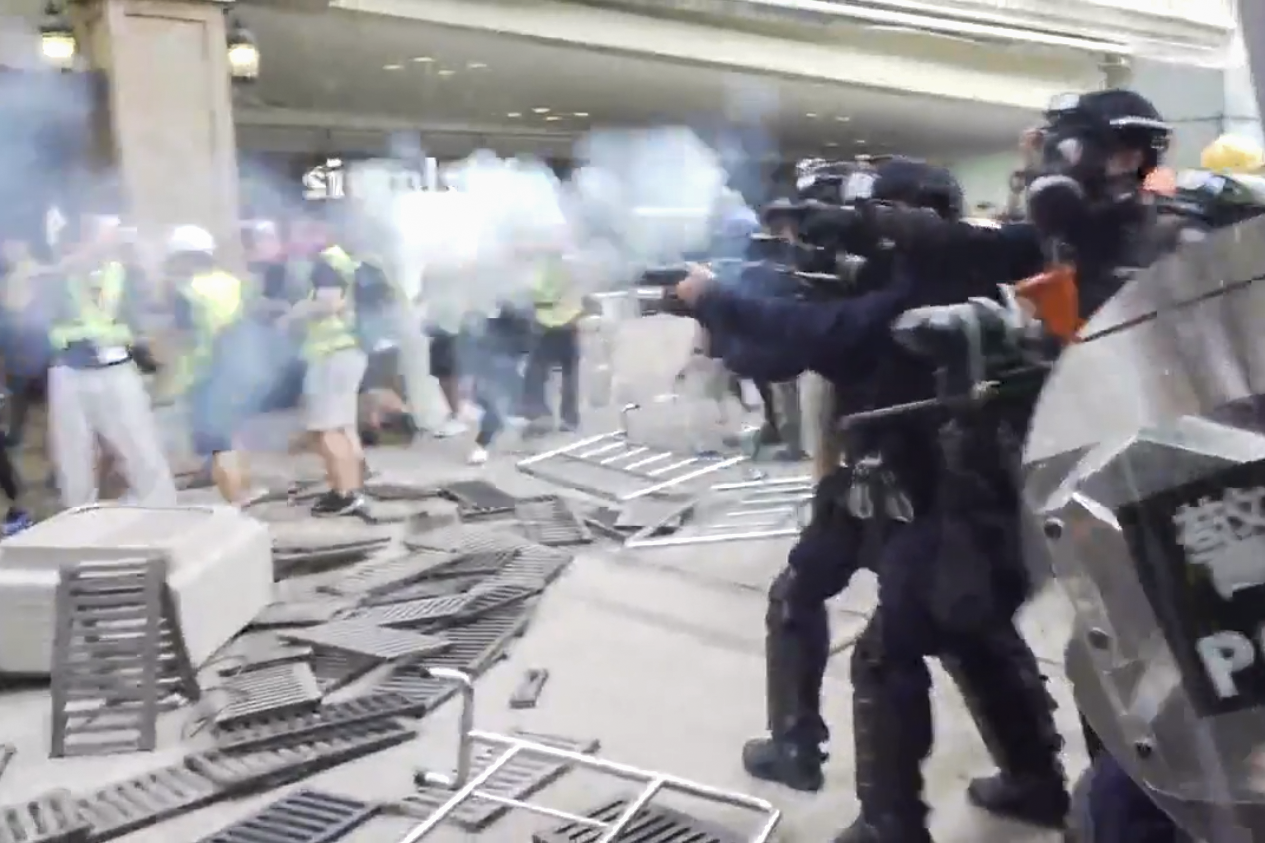
Special Tactical Contingent firing tear gas on the Telford Plaza MCL Cinema platform.

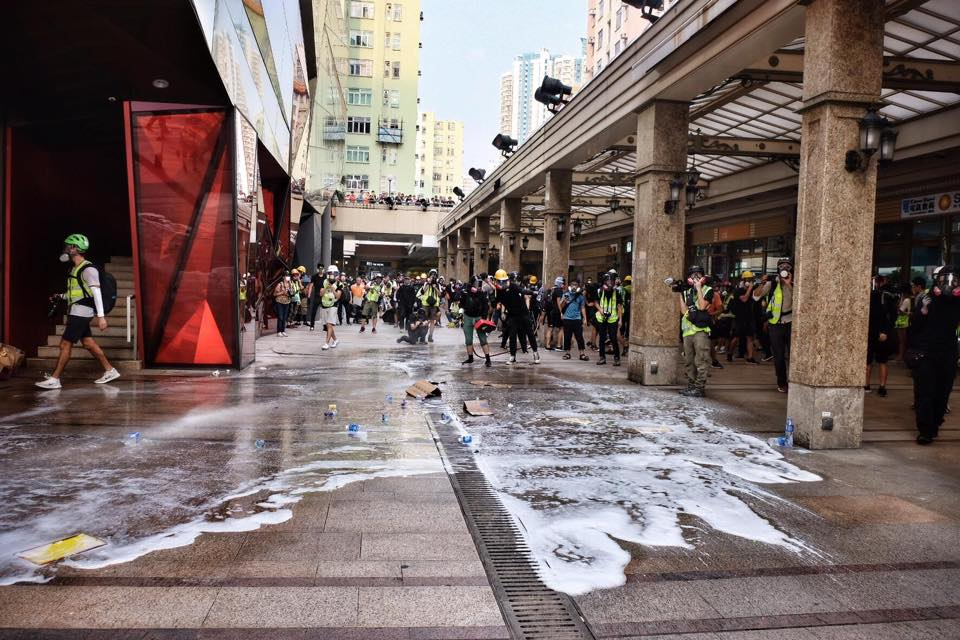
Protesters pour soapy water and oil on the ground to prevent police from entering the mall.

Around 5:20 p.m., members of the Special Tactical Contingent entered the Telford Plaza MCL Cinema platform. Some accused the squad of "using Hong Kong people's money to shoot Hong Kong people." A squad member responded, "Don't I pay taxes? How much tax do you pay?" Unarmed citizens expressed concerns that the use of tear gas in Telford Plaza, a residential area, would frighten children. Protesters used manhole covers as barricades. Legislator Ted Hui arrived to mediate, urging police not to clear the mall and to withdraw. Police fired again, then retreated and left the platform. At 5:45 p.m., the Special Tactical Contingent fired hard sponge grenades, pepper-spray projectile, and tear gas on the platform outside MCL Cinema. Protesters threw petrol bombs and poured soapy water and oil on the ground. Some citizens and protesters took shelter inside MCL Cinema and the mall, where most shops had closed their shutters.

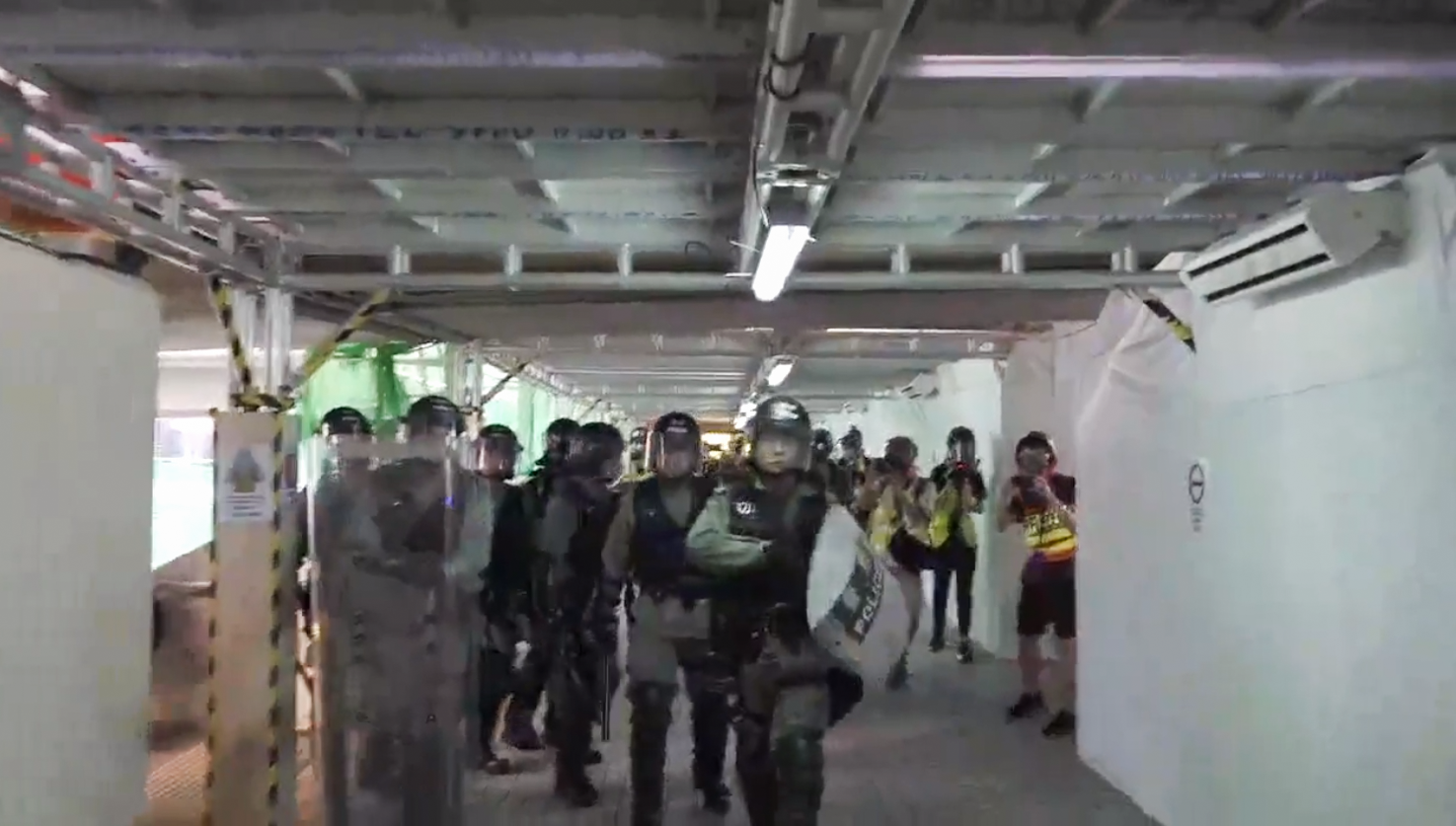
Riot police enter the pedestrian bridge to Telford Plaza.

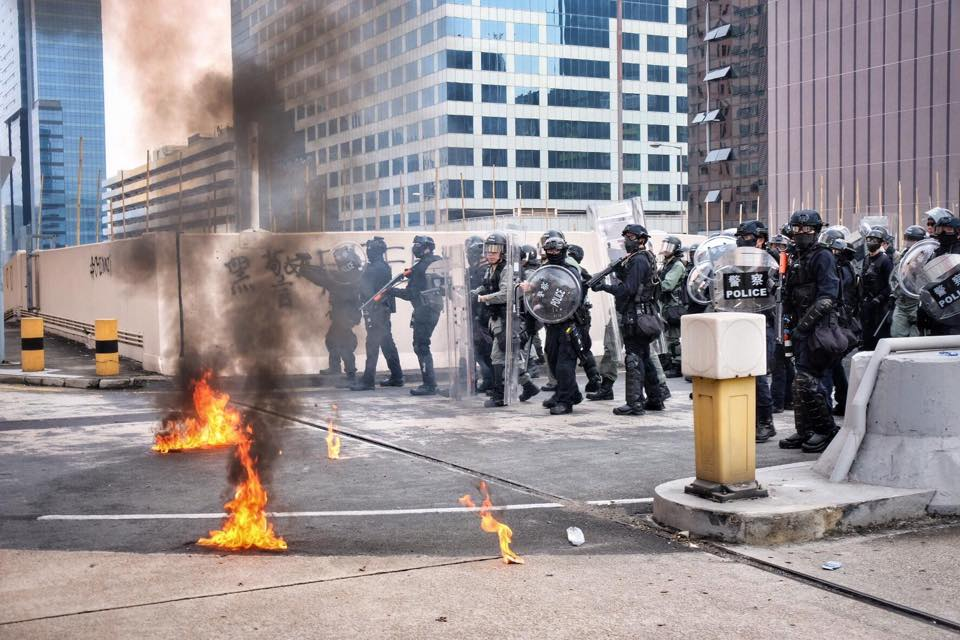
Multiple Special Tactical Contingent members and riot police move from Wai Yip Street via a ramp to Telford Plaza, with protesters throwing petrol bombs.

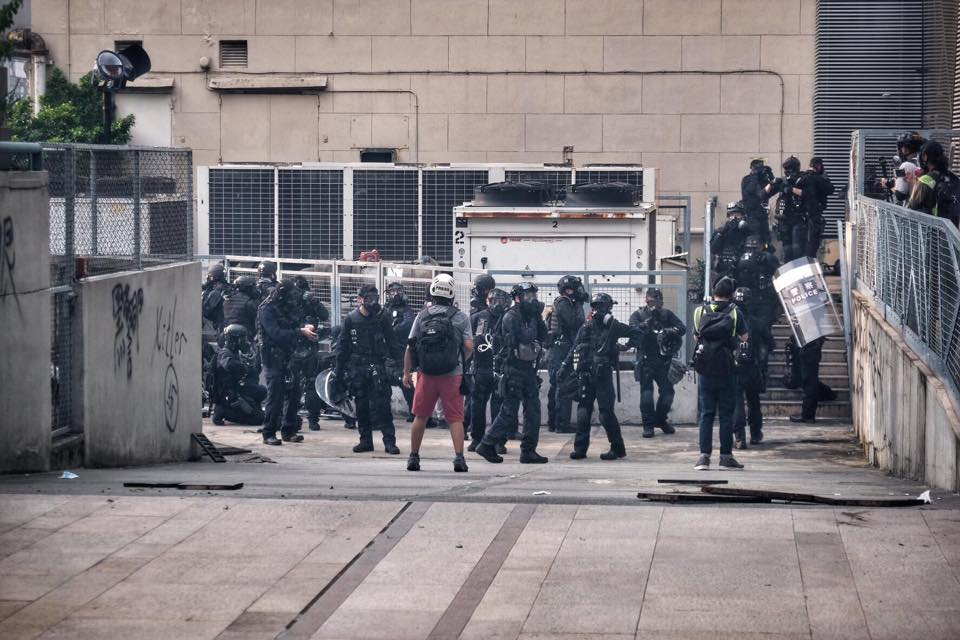
Multiple Special Tactical Contingent members enter the MCL Cinema platform.

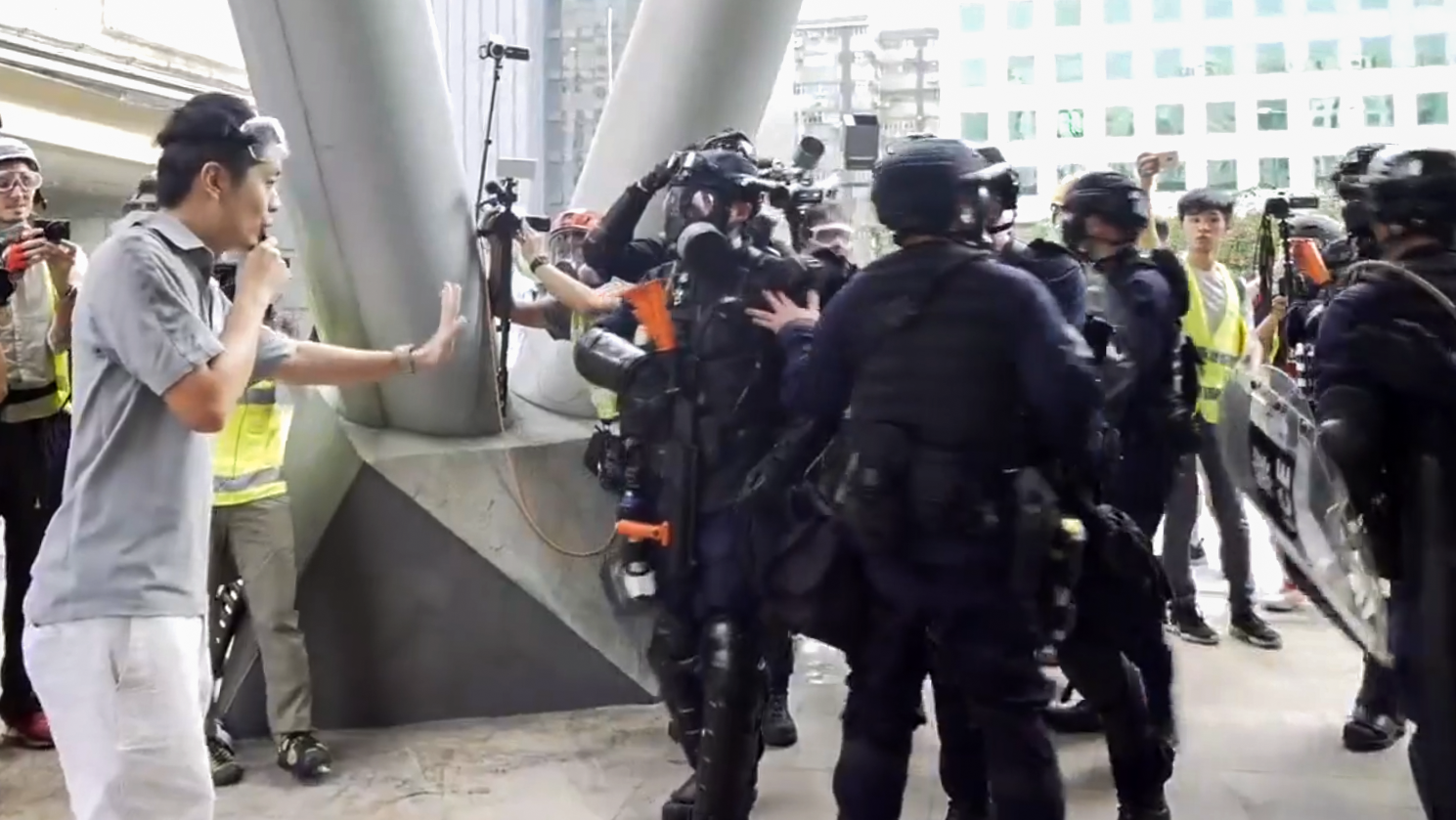
Legislator Ted Hui mediates, urging police not to clear the mall.

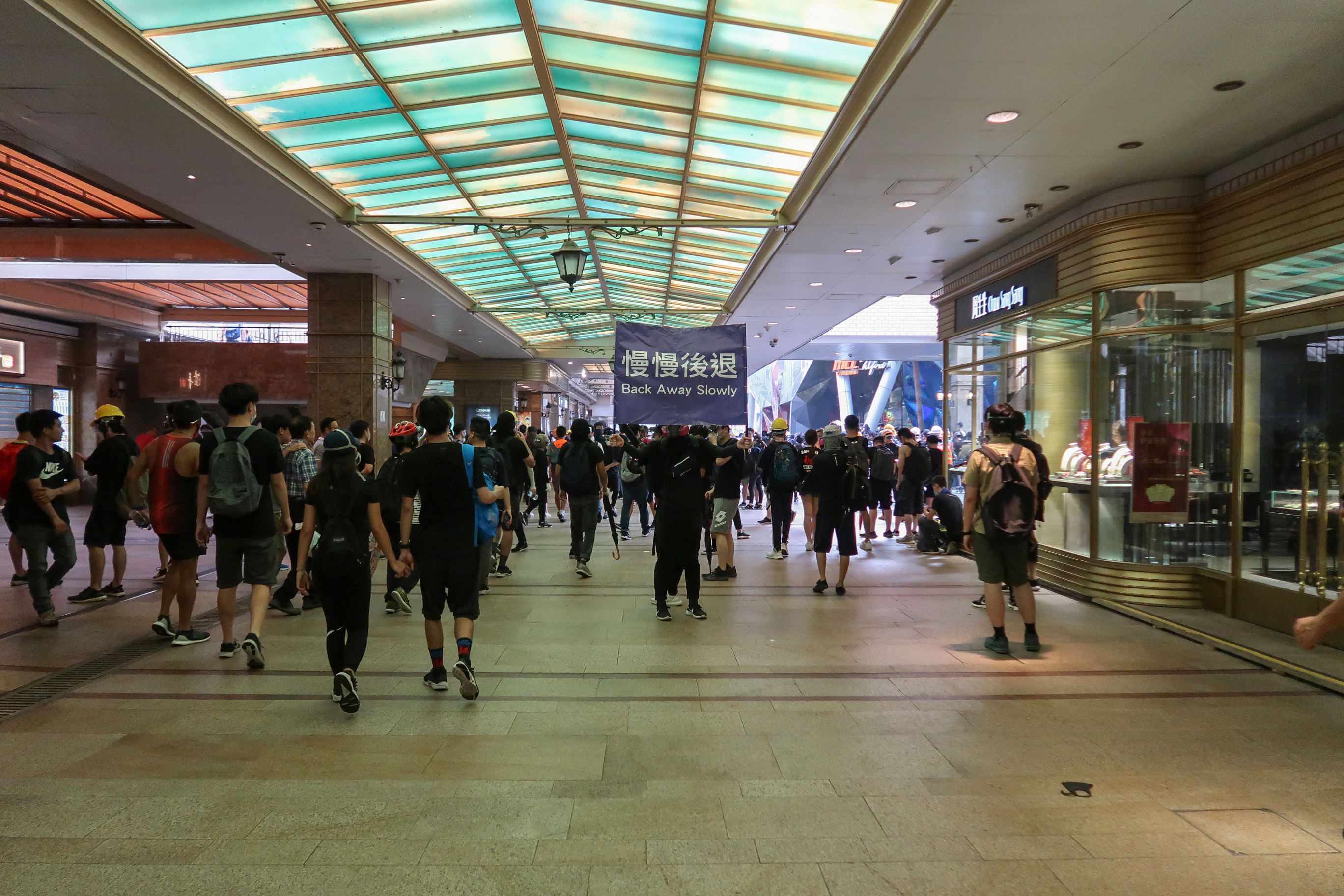
Protesters at Telford Plaza's Golden Avenue raise a "Back away slowly" flag.

==== Ngau Tau Kok clashes ====
At 5:00 p.m., the police issued a press release urging people to leave the area immediately and advising residents to stay in safe locations. A visually impaired person holding a white cane was temporarily stranded outside the Ngau Tau Kok Police Station and unable to leave. Artist Denise Ho arrived at the scene, offering assistance.

At 6:25 p.m., police raised an orange flag and fired multiple tear gas canisters and rubber bullets. Protesters advanced toward the police line, prompting further tear gas deployment. Some protesters scattered, while others picked up tear gas canisters and threw them back toward the police, who raised the orange flag again. Some protesters blocked the intersection of Lai Yip Street and Kwun Tong Road to allow others on Wai Yip Street to leave. At 6:40 p.m., police raised the black flag, warning protesters against using laser pointers on officers, threatening arrests. Meanwhile, many protesters fled toward Ngau Tau Kok station. By around 7:00 p.m., police cleared the area, supported by numerous police vehicles, and all protesters had left.

=== Spread to other districts ===
==== Wong Tai Sin clashes ====
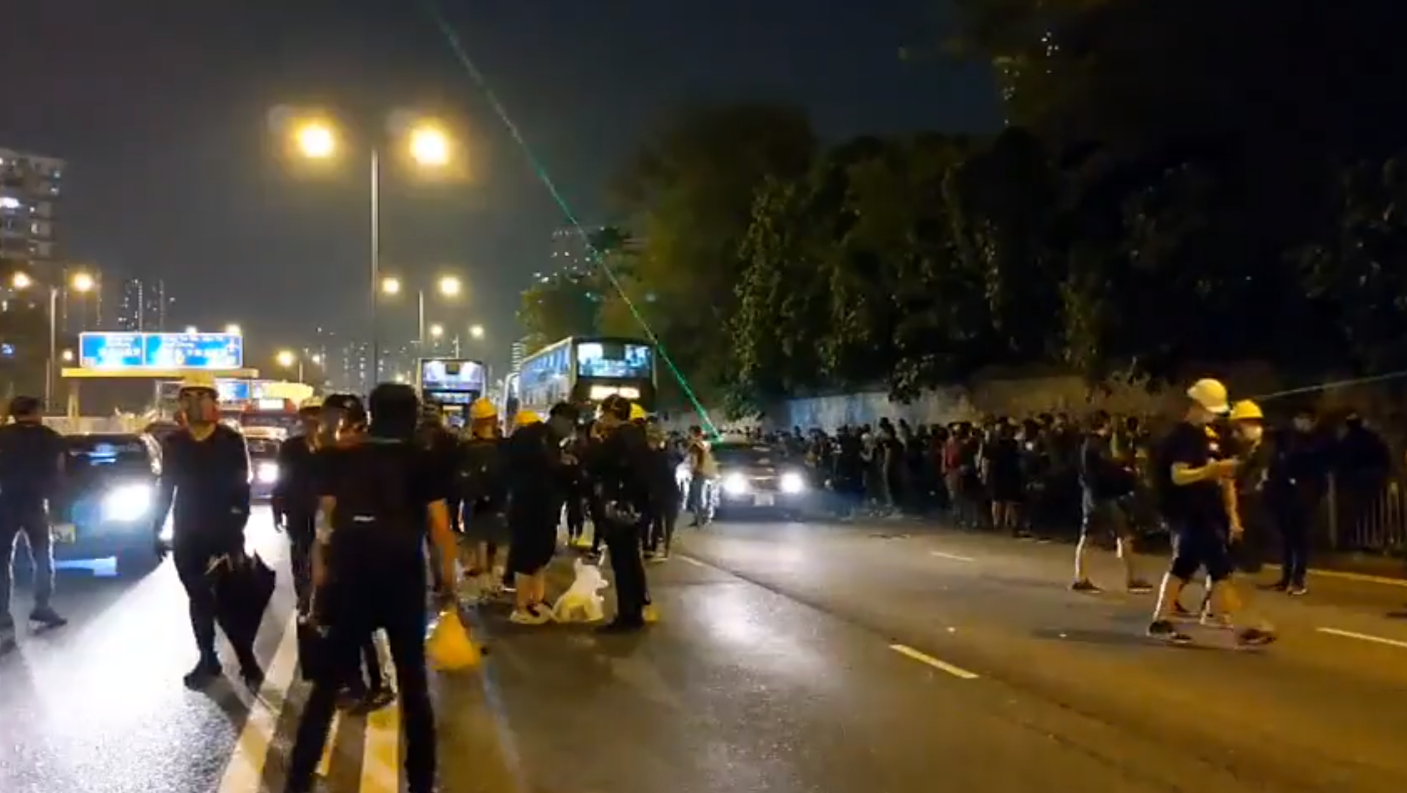
Around 7:30 p.m., protesters marched along Lung Cheung Road toward Choi Hung.

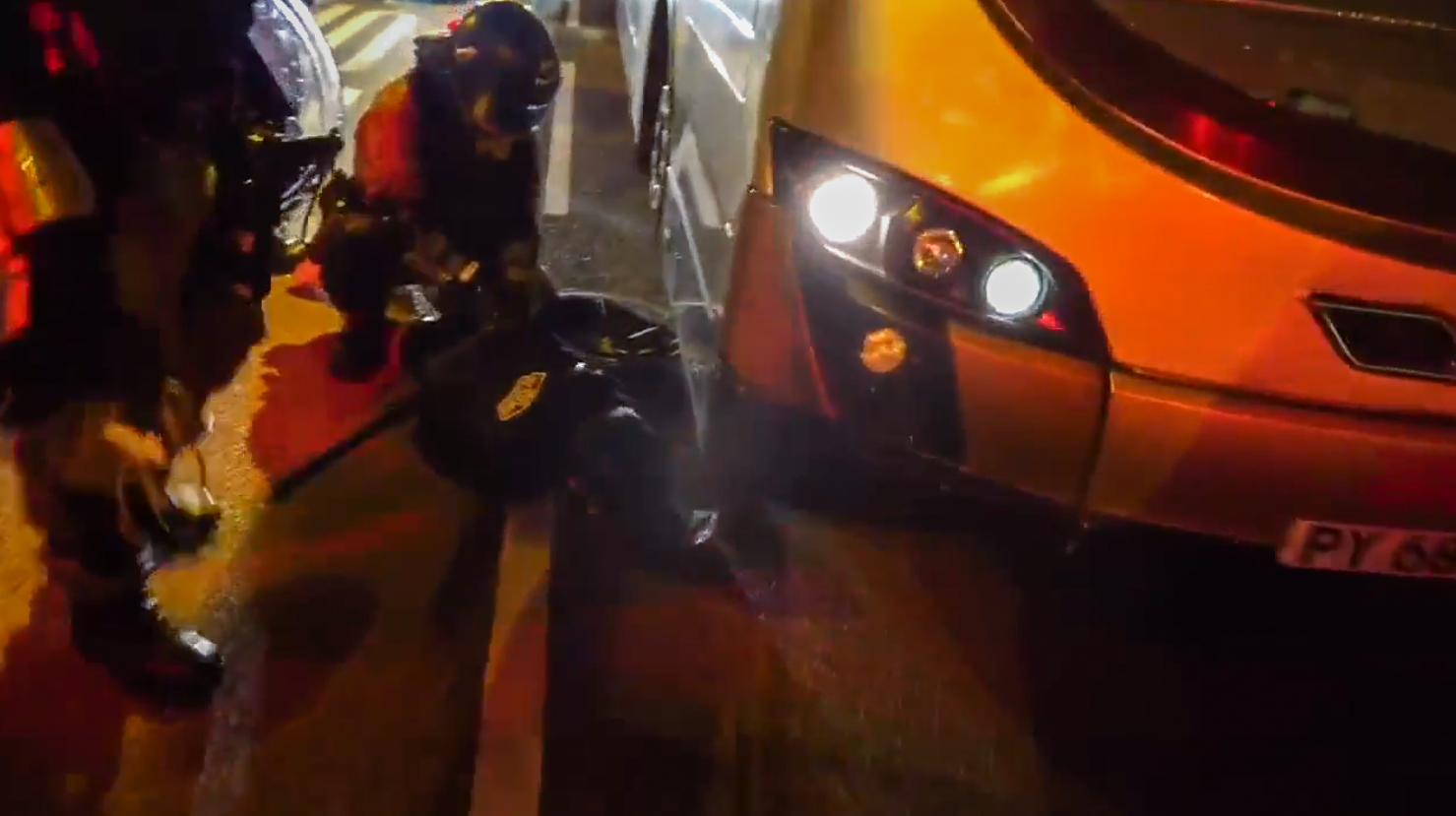
Around 9:00 p.m., riot police conducted dispersal operations on Lung Cheung Road, subduing protesters on the ground.

Around 7:00 p.m., protesters moved to Kowloon Bay, then marched to Choi Hung station and took the MTR to Wong Tai Sin. Protesters blocked Lung Cheung Road with debris. The police announced that the Wong Tai Sin Police Station reporting room would suspend services from 8:00 p.m. At 8:54 p.m., police raised the black flag, stating that protesters throwing bricks necessitated the use of tear gas. At 9:05 p.m., riot police advanced along Lung Cheung Road, subduing some protesters as they fled. At Temple Mall, glass was thrown from a height, injuring a woman in white who was bleeding from her head.

At 9:15 p.m., a photographer from the online media outlet Rice Post was filming riot police clearing obstacles on Lung Cheung Road near Temple Mall, with no protesters within five meters. While retreating, the photographer felt intense pain in their leg and discovered a gunshot wound to the back of their knee, requiring emergency ambulance transport to a hospital. Additionally, a volunteer first aider was reportedly shot twice in the back near the neck while leaving and was assisted by other first aiders for treatment inside an MTR train. At 9:20 p.m., police reported that many protesters continued to block Lung Cheung Road, throw bricks, and shine laser pointers at officers. Riot police deployed tear gas to disperse them. According to Hong Kong 01, a resident named Mr. Li reported that after dinner, he saw a police officer with a gun on Lung Cheung Road and shouted, "Dark Cops, what are you shooting? This is a residential area!" He was then surrounded by several officers, who allegedly pulled him and kicked his right shin six to seven times, despite no resistance. At 9:41 p.m., many unarmed Wong Tai Sin residents expressed dissatisfaction with the police, calling them "triads" and chanting slogans like "No rioters, only tyranny." Police shone bright lights at residents, who continued shouting about "light pollution" and demanding the police "return their eyes." Around 11:00 p.m., riot police on Muk Lun Street raised a blue flag and donned masks, conducting multiple clearance operations. Residents on the Lung Cheung Road footbridge verbally confronted police, who raised a blue flag, accusing them of unlawful assembly. By 12:30 a.m., police ascended the footbridge, but the crowd had dispersed. By midnight, riot police on Muk Lun Street began to leave.

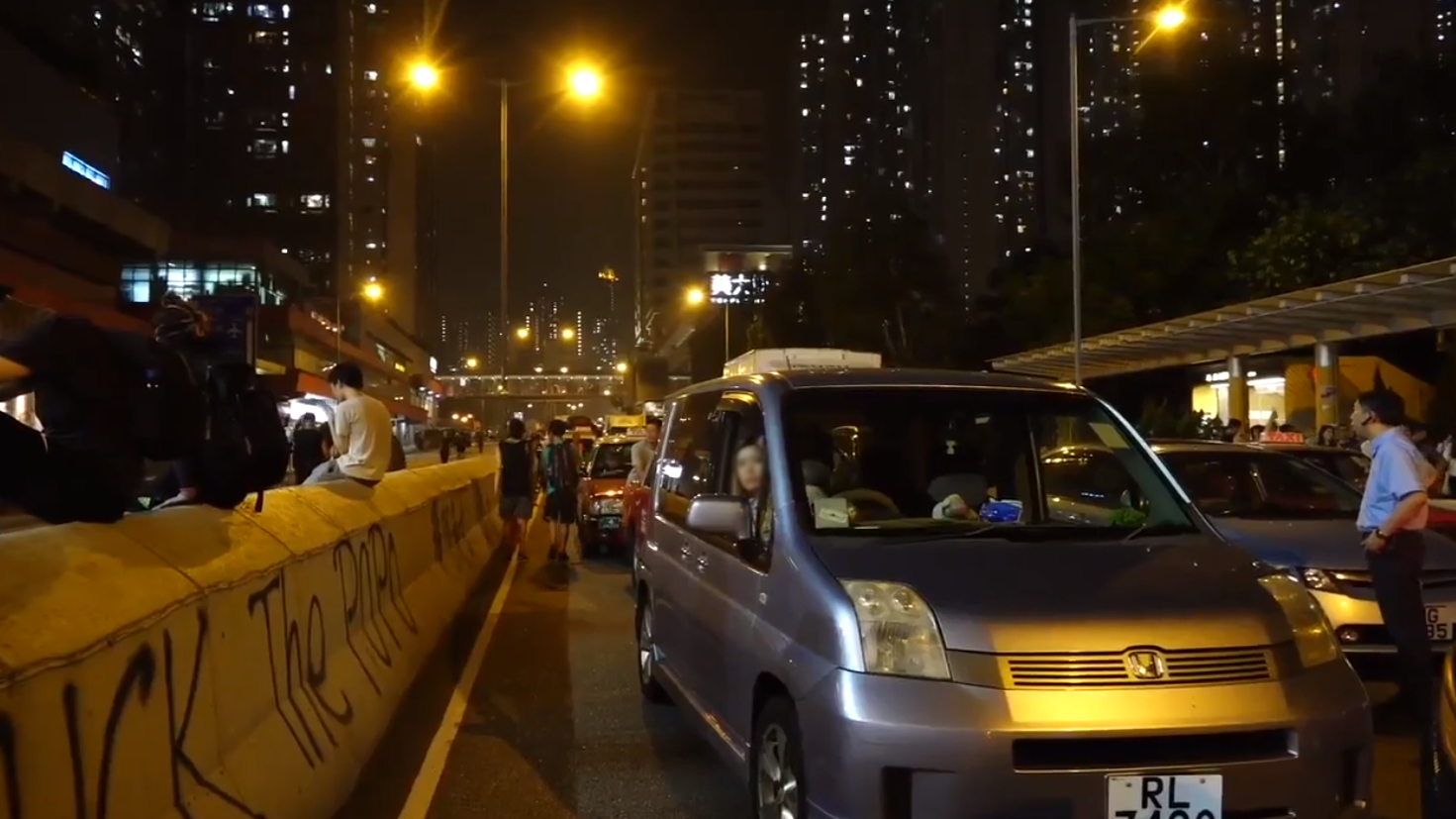
Protesters block Lung Cheung Road with debris, causing traffic congestion.

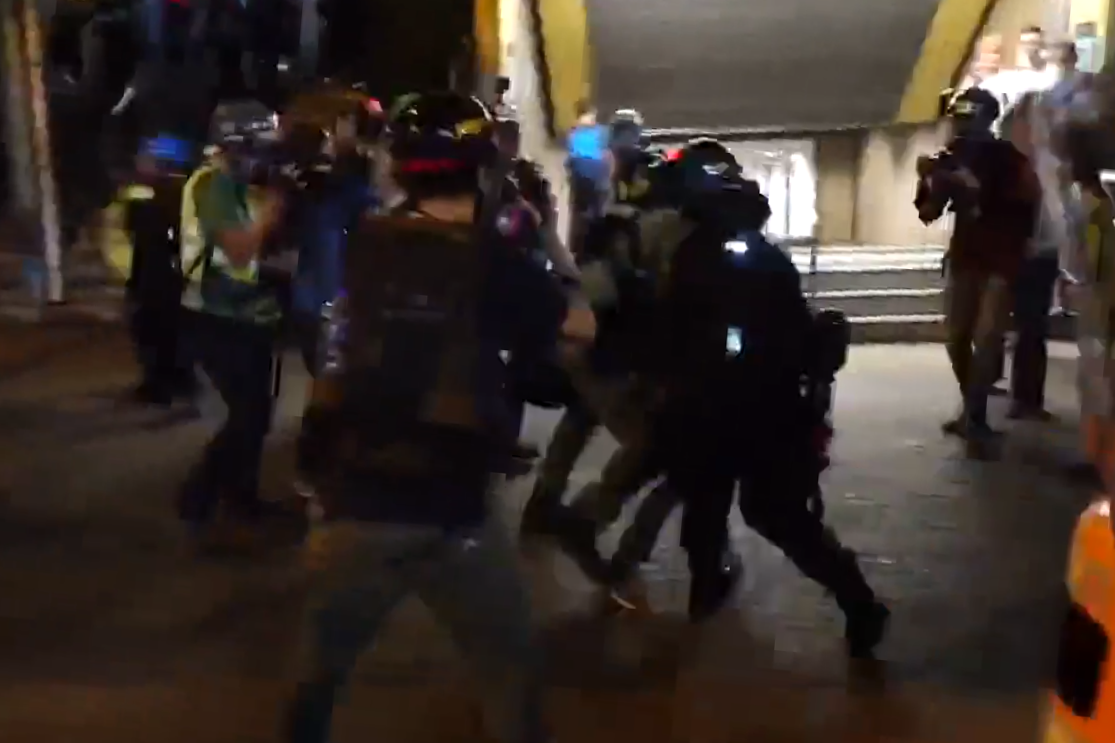
Riot police and a Special Tactical Contingent officer leap from Lung Cheung Road to the pavement to subdue a person.

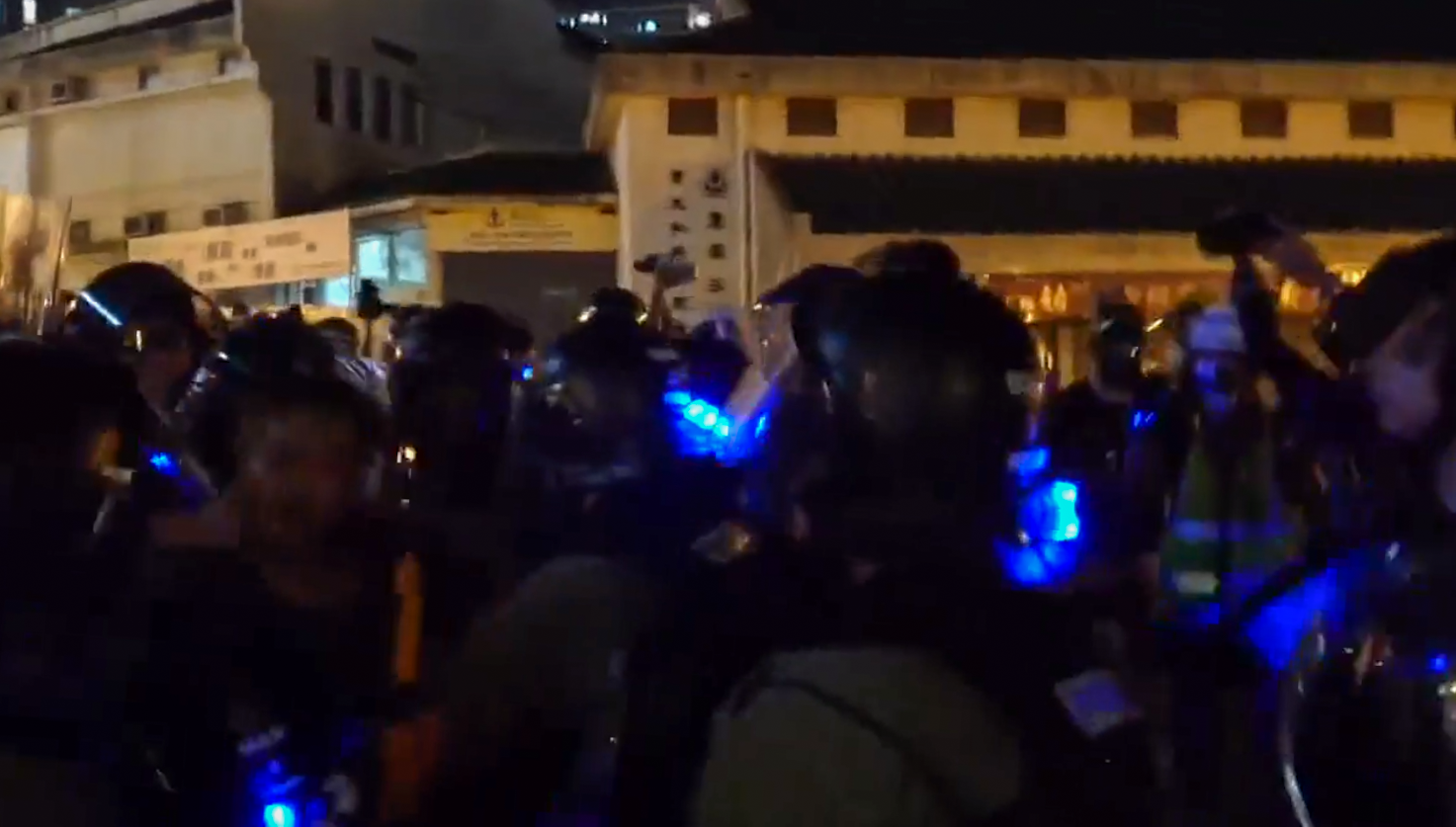
Multiple riot police suddenly enter an open area near Temple Mall to subdue a person.

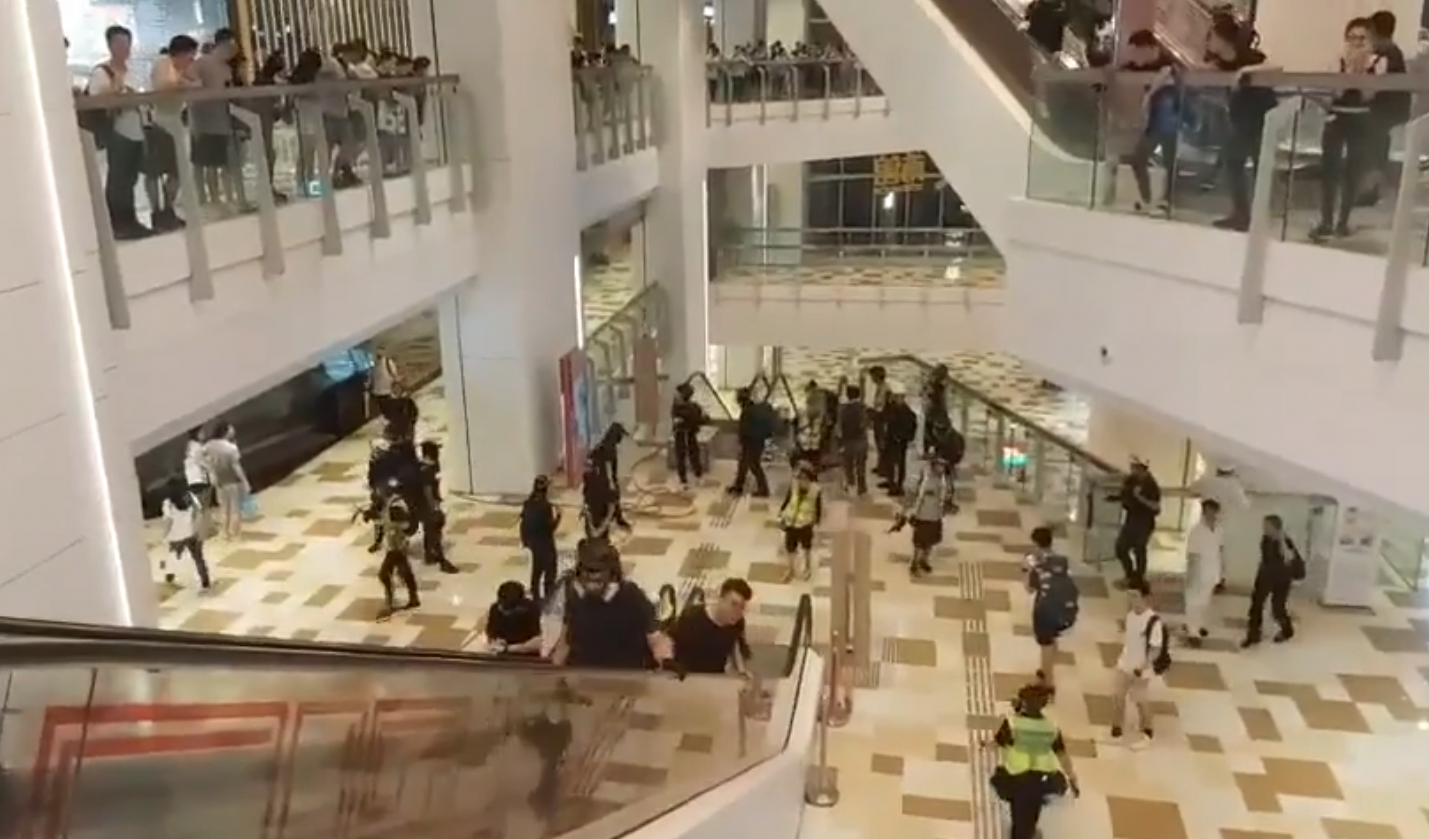
Protesters enter Temple Mall, using fire hoses to wet the ground.

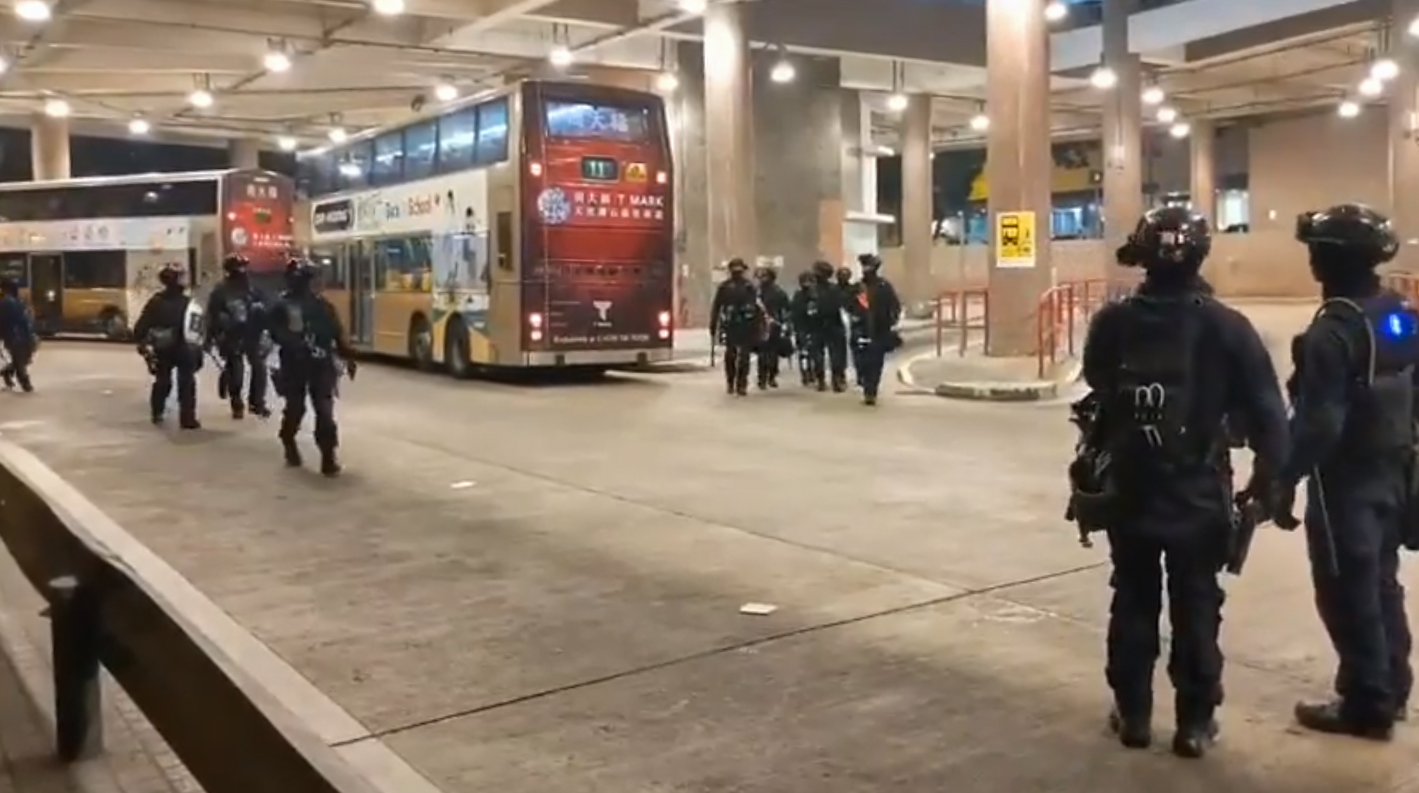
Multiple Special Tactical Contingent members at Wong Tai Sin Bus Terminus.

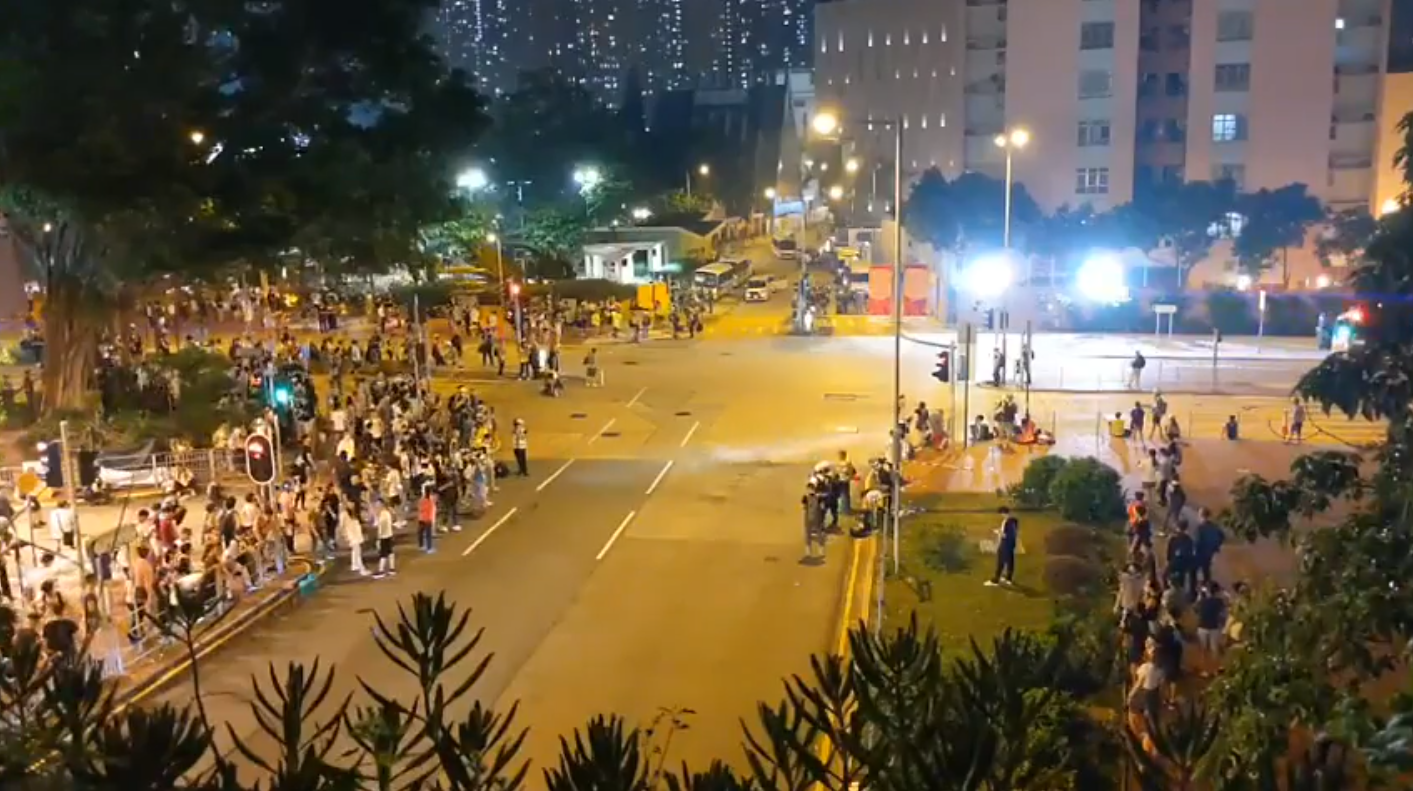
Many residents linger outside Wong Tai Sin Disciplined Services Quarters.

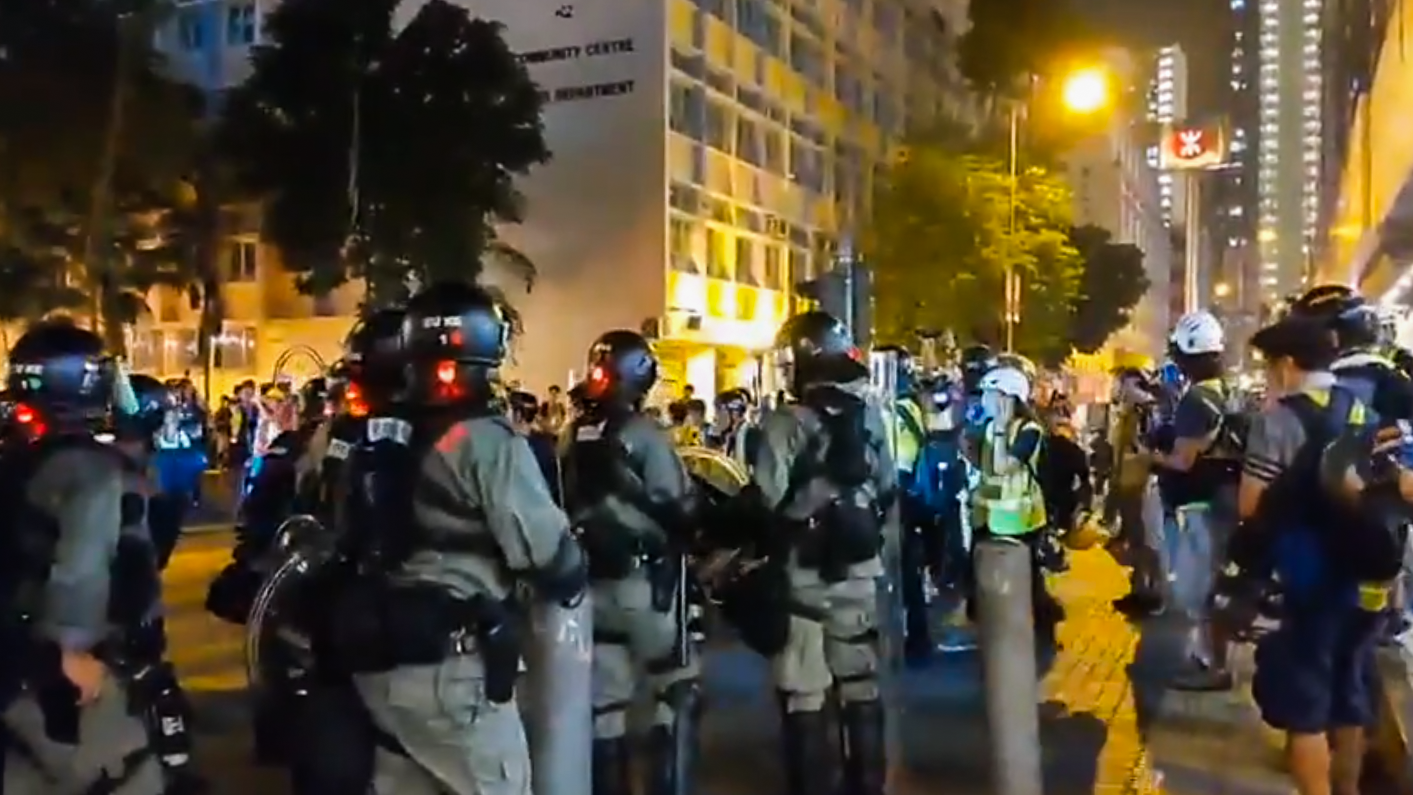
Riot police move to Ching Tak Street for dispersal.

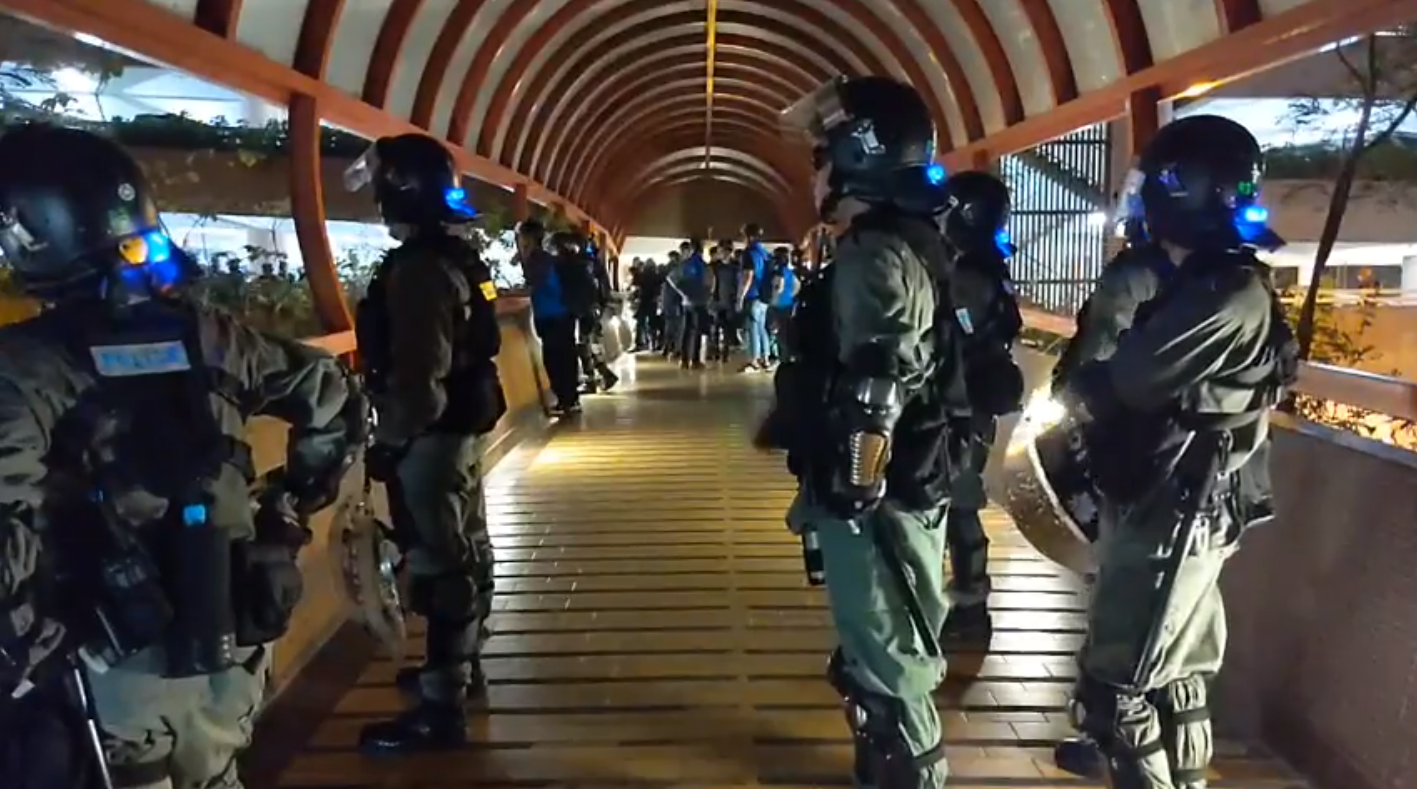
Police stand by on the Temple Mall footbridge.

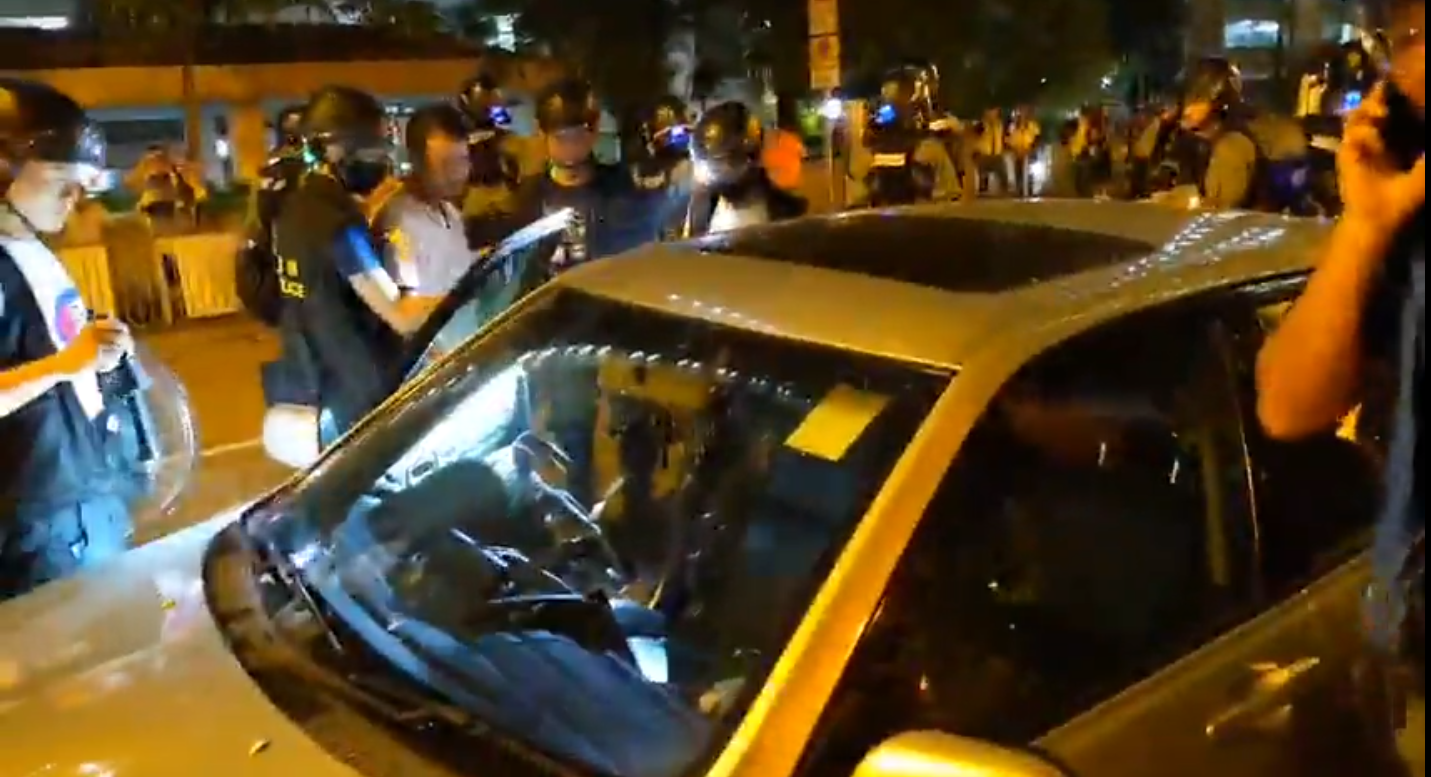
Around 11:30 p.m., a man in white is escorted for a vehicle search.

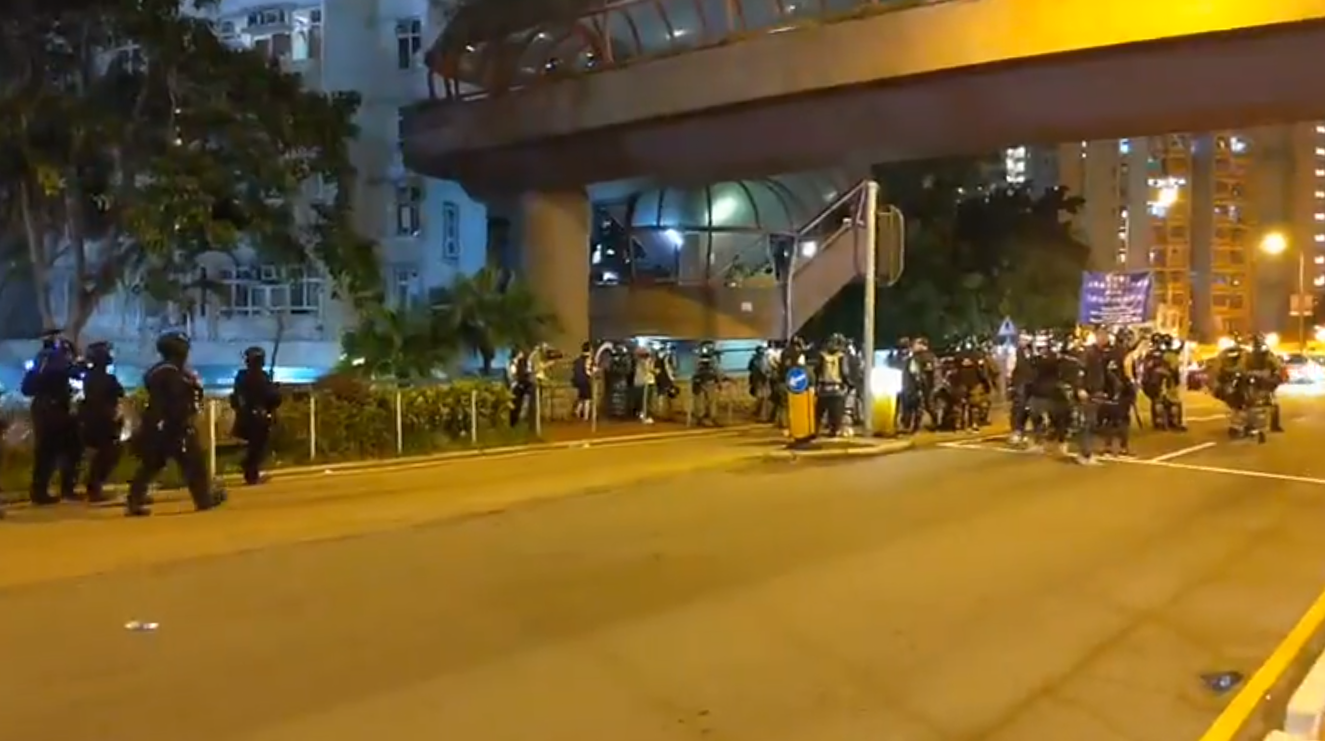
Riot police raise a blue flag on Tung Tau Tsuen Road.

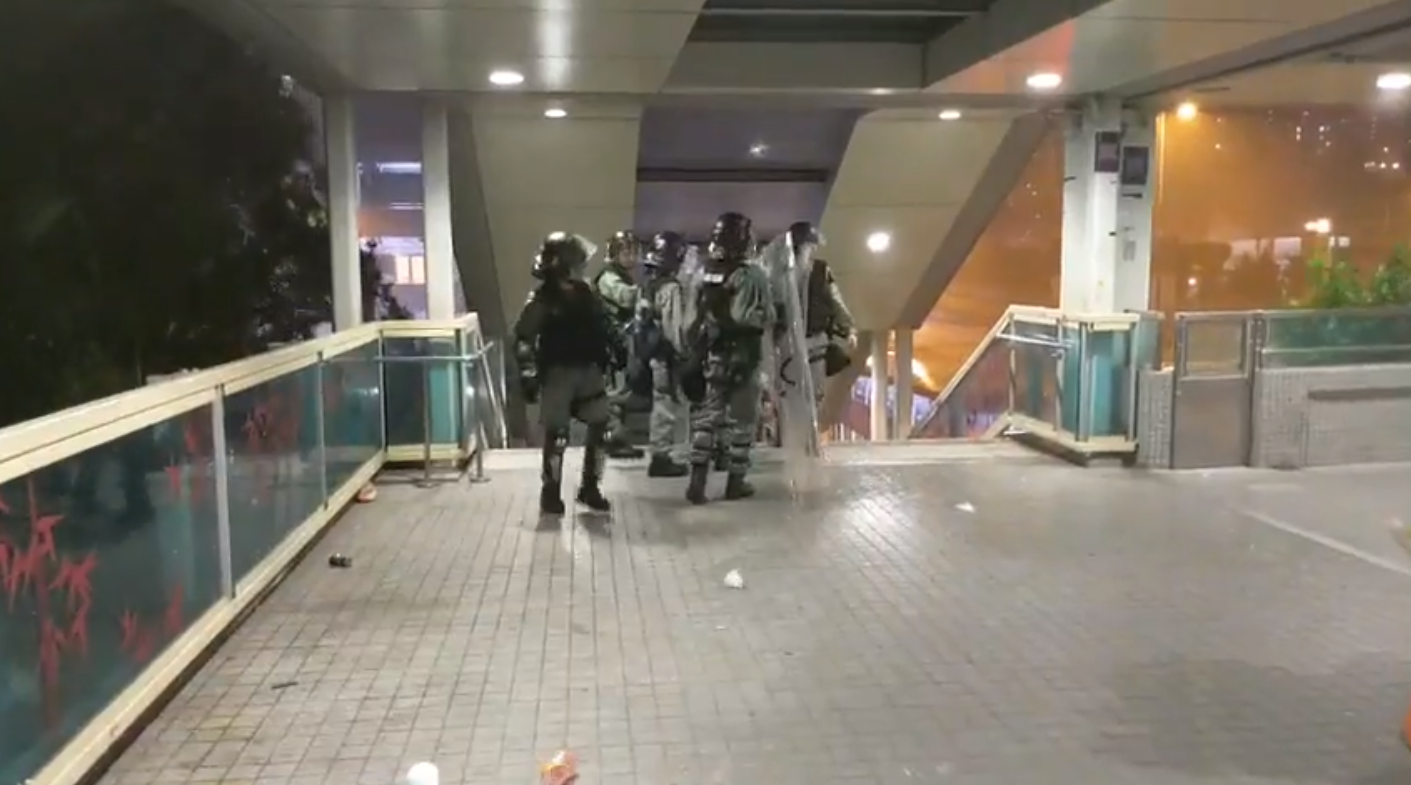
At 12:30 a.m., large numbers of riot police ascend the footbridge.

==== Sham Shui Po clashes ====
Around 10:00 p.m., protesters gathered on Sham Shui Po's Cheung Sha Wan Road, setting up barricades with trash bins and MTR station fire extinguishers. Some protesters told reporters their destination was the Sham Shui Po Police Station. Several Sham Shui Po residents, possibly upset with the protesters, engaged in verbal confrontations, which escalated into physical altercations. A man in a white shirt was bleeding from his face and received treatment from volunteer first aiders. Later, a middle-aged man in slippers brandished a caidao, becoming agitated after his slippers were damaged. He was escorted away by volunteer first aiders.

At 10:30 p.m., riot police formed a line outside the Sham Shui Po Police Station, approximately 100 meters from the protesters, who sprayed fire extinguishers. Police raised a black flag to warn the protesters. By around 10:50 p.m., some protesters boarded the MTR at Sham Shui Po station to leave.

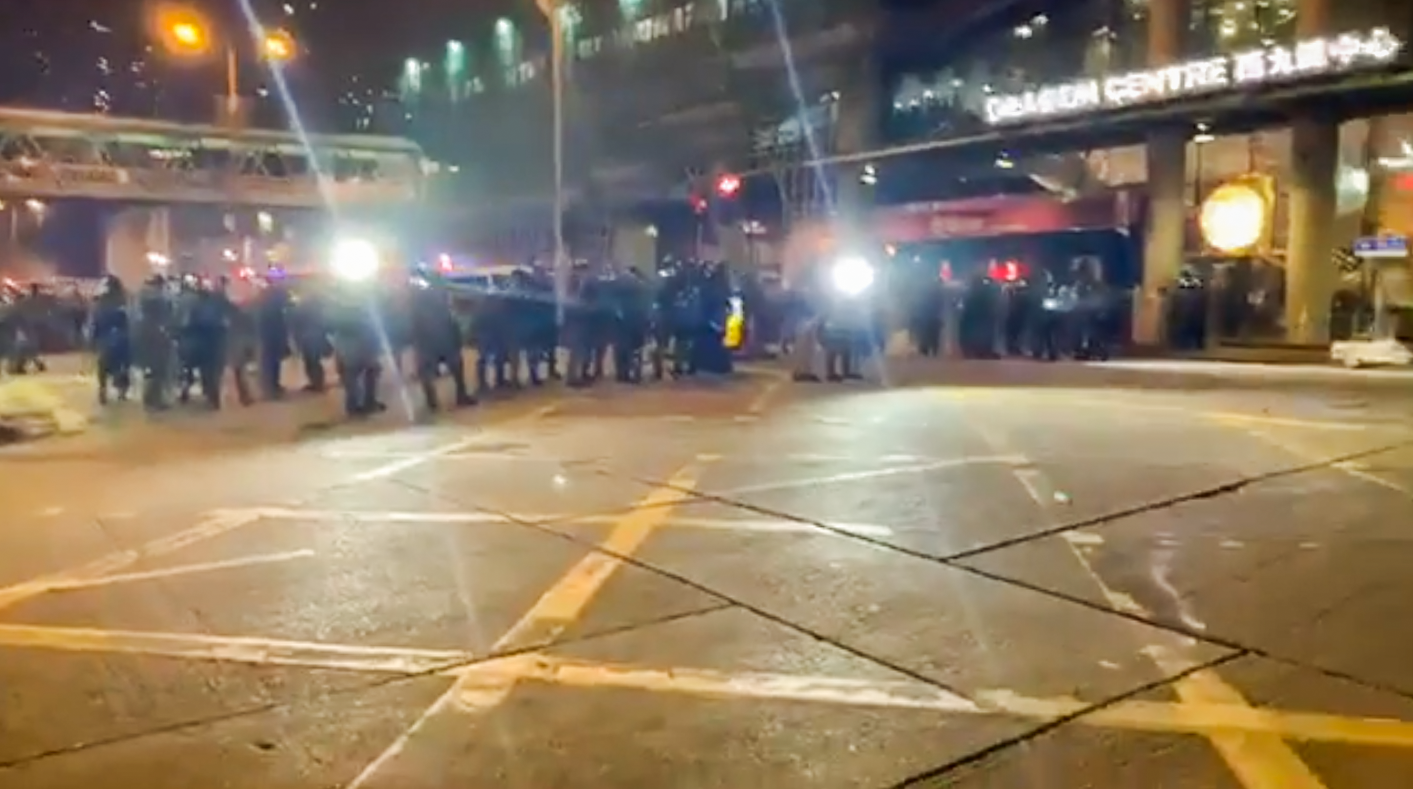
Riot police use spotlights on Yen Chow Street.

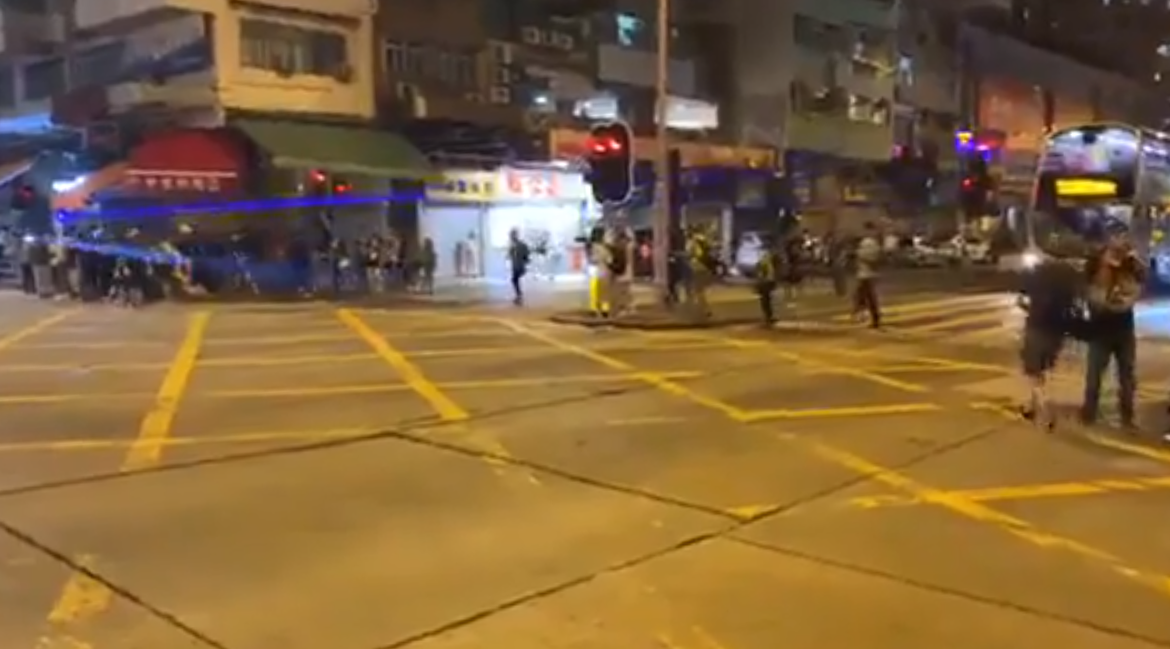
Protesters shine laser pointers toward police.

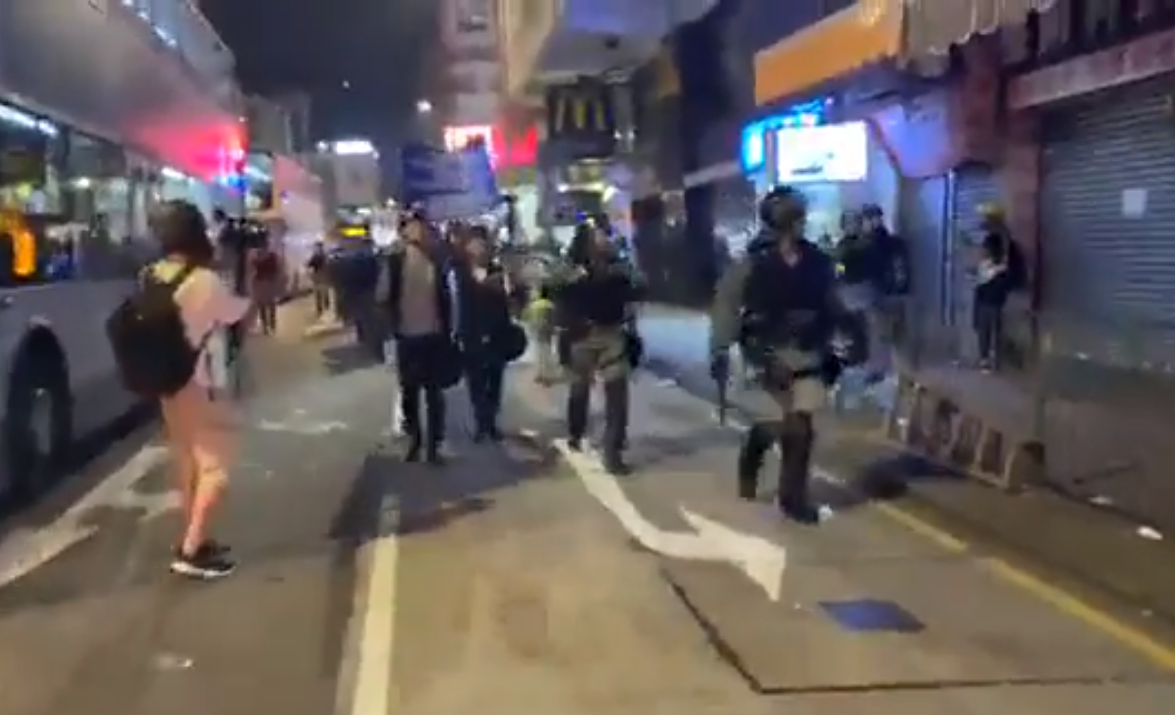
Riot police raise a blue flag on Cheung Sha Wan Road.

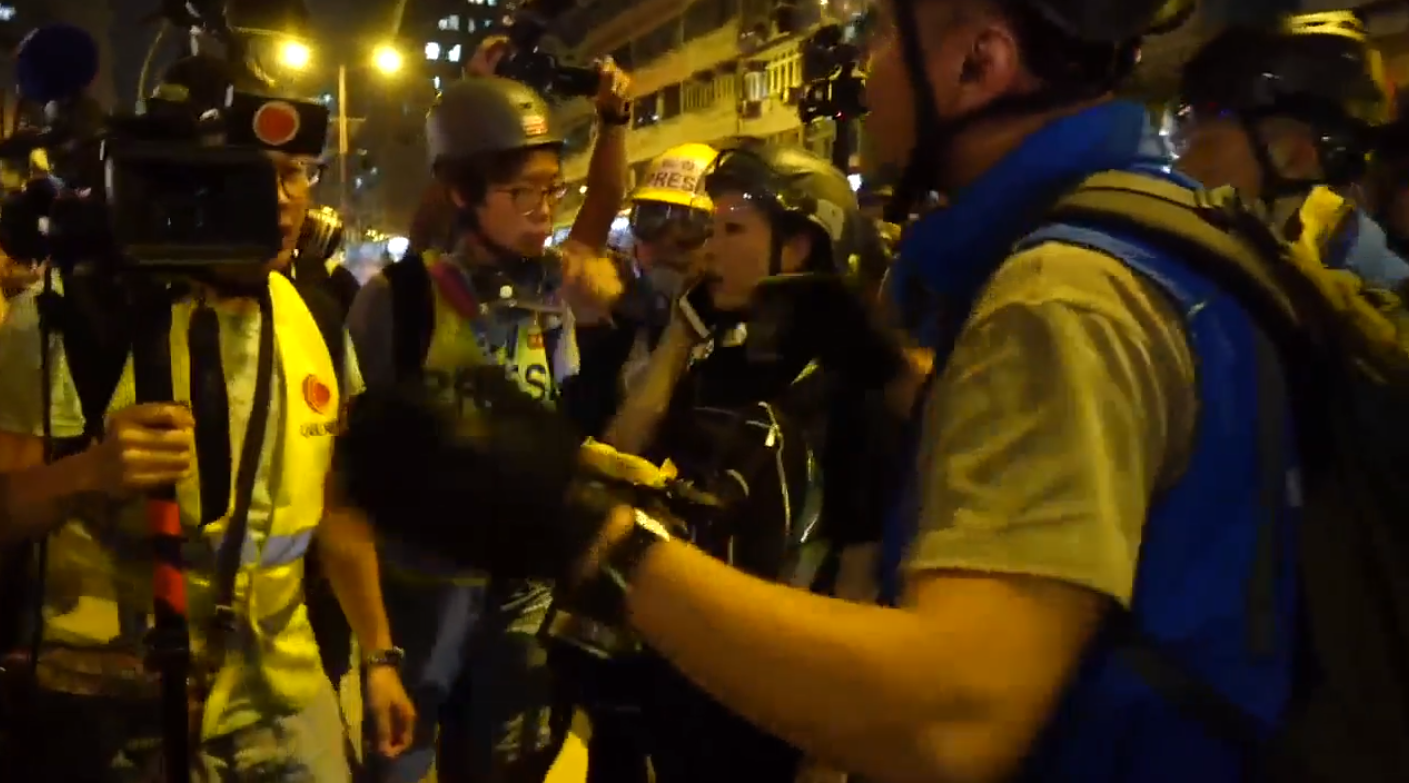
A photographer argues with police.

== Reactions ==
=== Government ===
During the protest, smart lampposts were vandalized. The Office of the Government Chief Information Officer reported that all 20 smart lampposts on Sheung Yuet Road in Kowloon Bay were damaged, with one completely sawed off and the remaining 19 forcibly opened, damaging their smart devices. All smart lamppost services were suspended. The office estimated that reinstalling the lampposts would take about two to three months, with an average installation cost of approximately HK$140,000 per lamppost.

A government spokesperson strongly condemned the vandalism, stating that the government had clarified that smart lampposts do not involve facial recognition and do not infringe on privacy. The lampposts collect urban data such as traffic and air quality. The spokesperson described the protesters' actions as "disregarding facts and utterly unreasonable," and police would investigate rigorously.

Additionally, some protesters deviated from the designated route, causing "severe traffic congestion and disruption to emergency services," according to the government. It further stated that protesters attacked police with bricks and arson, seriously threatening officers' safety, and urged protesters to "stop violence and restore order to society as soon as possible."

=== Kwun Tong District Council ===
On August 26, the Kwun Tong District Council held a meeting to discuss the protest-related clashes and the MTR station closures. Councillor Kelvin So Koon-chung criticized the station closures as overly hasty and excessively broad in scope. Councillor Winnie Poon Yam argued that the MTR's decision to close stations "placed public transport in a political stance." DAB councillor Chan Kwok-wah suggested that the closures were a consequence of "rioters causing destruction," stating that the MTR closed stations to ensure public safety.

The council also discussed the Telford Plaza clashes. Winnie Poon questioned the appropriateness of police firing tear gas in a residential area, citing police documents suggesting that citizens could avoid impact by leaving affected areas. She argued that as Telford Plaza is a residential area, residents could not easily leave and were inevitably affected.

== Controversies and aftermath ==
=== Traffic disruptions ===
Multiple bus routes in Kwun Tong District were rerouted. Over 20 Kowloon Motor Bus routes were temporarily suspended.

=== MTR's first station closure ===
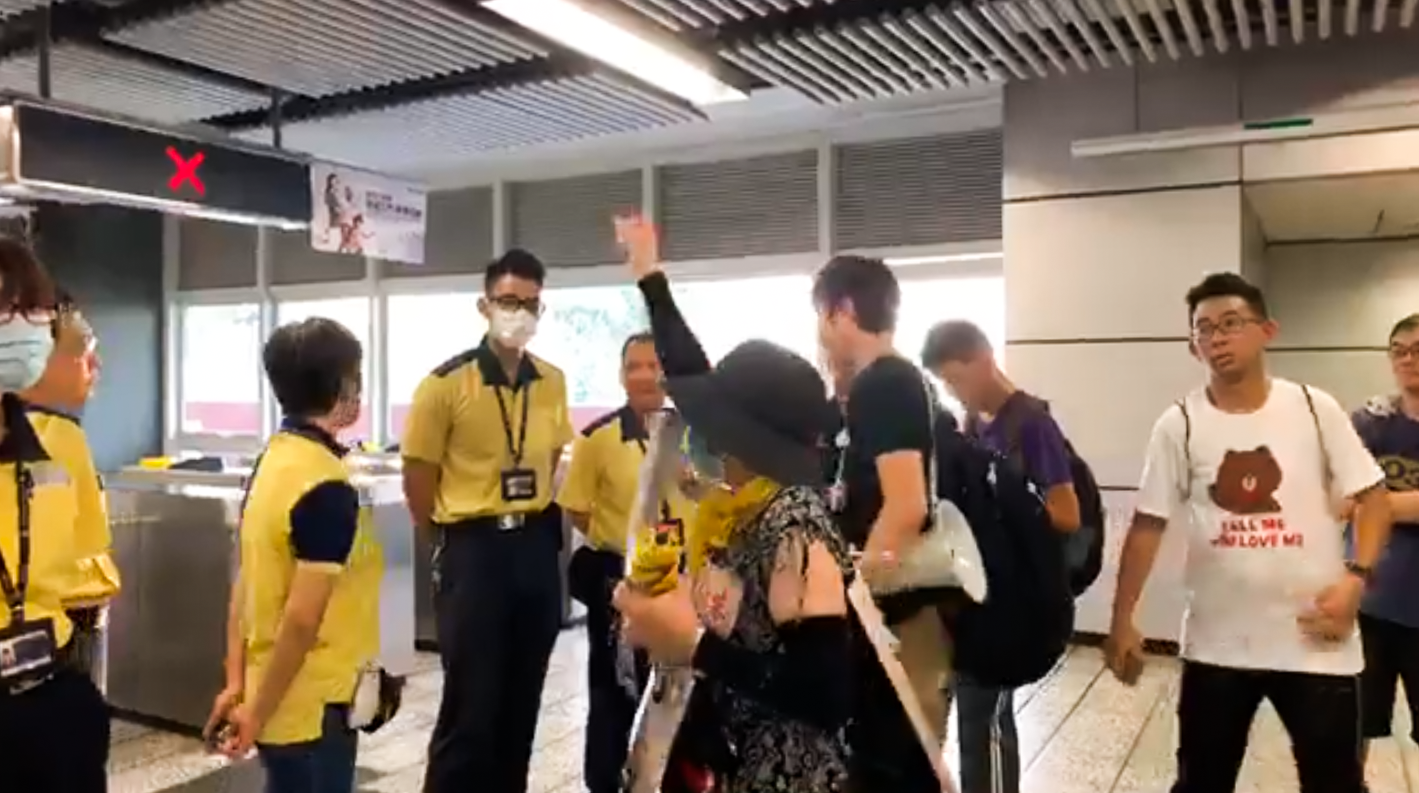
Around 4:00 p.m., protesters gathered at Kowloon Bay station after the march, expressing dissatisfaction with partial service suspensions to MTR staff.

On the morning of the protest, the MTR suddenly announced that from 12:00 p.m., services on the Kwun Tong line from Choi Hung station to Tiu Keng Leng station would be suspended, and all entrances to Kowloon Bay station to Lam Tin station would be closed. The MTR cited the need to protect staff, passengers, and facilities. This was the first time the MTR suspended services due to a protest. According to Hong Kong 01, the MTR decided to close stations the night before the protest and informed government departments but only announced the closures to the public at 10:30 a.m. on the protest day, over ten hours later.

An MTR spokesperson explained that if stations were closed or services temporarily suspended, passengers would be notified "in a timely manner." Apart from dissatisfaction among protesters, affected citizens, including those traveling during the holiday, were also frustrated. Hong Kong 01 reported that local residents criticized the MTR for poor arrangements, noting the lack of shuttle bus services for affected passengers. Some passengers remarked that the MTR "didn't know what it was afraid of," pointing out that previous protests had not disrupted rail services, making the closure unnecessary. Legislators Wu Chi-wai and Jeremy Tam, along with 16 district councillors from Kwun Tong and Wong Tai Sin, issued a joint statement condemning the MTR for obstructing citizens' participation in lawful activities, exacerbating social tensions, and setting a harmful precedent. They also questioned whether the MTR's actions violated the Hong Kong Railway Ordinance.

The then-MTR Operations Director, Lau Tin-shing, issued an open letter that evening, explaining that the suspension was to prevent a repeat of earlier incidents at Kwai Fong station, where facilities were damaged and MTR staff were verbally abused, hoping for public understanding.

=== Judicial Review ===
Under the Hong Kong Railway Ordinance, the MTR is required to maintain "proper and efficient" services. The station closures during the protest led to public suspicion that the MTR had violated this ordinance. Kwok Cheuk-kin filed for a judicial review, requesting the court to declare the MTR's closure decision as misconduct. Kwok's application stated that the MTR's closure decision left rally participants without transportation, forcing them to walk home, which led to road blockages and police clearance operations.

The High Court judge ruled that the court lacked authority to oversee the conduct of public or private institutions in judicial reviews. The MTR's decision to suspend services to ensure the safety of passengers, staff, and facilities was deemed "not unreasonable." Additionally, Kwok admitted he did not personally participate in the protest and was not affected by the closures, leading the judge to conclude he lacked sufficient standing to apply for a judicial review, and the application was dismissed.

Hong Kong 01 quoted Progressive Lawyers Group member and barrister Horace Ho, who noted that while the MTR is bound by the Hong Kong Railway Ordinance, it would not face civil liability if it had the consent of the Secretary for Transport and Housing or instructions from the Chief Executive in conjunction with the Executive Council. However, he added that since the protest had received a Letter of No Objection from the Hong Kong Police Force, the government had a duty to facilitate citizens' right to protest. If the government allowed the MTR to suspend services, thereby obstructing the protest, it could violate the Hong Kong Bill of Rights Ordinance, which protects the freedom to participate in protests.

=== Allegations against the police ===
==== Incident of police officer dropping magazine ====
During a clash in Wong Tai Sin, a police officer dropped a speedloader with six cartridges. The then-Senior Superintendent of the Police Public Relations Branch, Kong Wing-cheung, acknowledged the incident at a press conference but explained that the officer immediately retrieved the magazine, and the photo was taken in the brief moment it was on the ground. Similar incidents of officers losing magazines, firearms, or cartridges occurred during subsequent protests. When asked if officers needed retraining, Kong stated that ensuring the functionality of speedloader or handgun pouches was more critical than additional training.

==== Allegations of police scratching off tear gas canister expiry dates ====
The police had previously used expired tear gas canisters during protests, raising public concerns about their safety and potential risks. Hong Kong 01 reported that online media captured images of a tear gas canister from the protest with its manufacturing date scratched off, fueling suspicions that the police were concealing expired canisters. At a press conference, then-Assistant Commissioner of Police, Mak Chin-ho, denied any intentional scratching of dates, calling it a false accusation and stating that the batch in question was not expired based on photographic evidence.

=== Allegations regarding smart lampposts ===
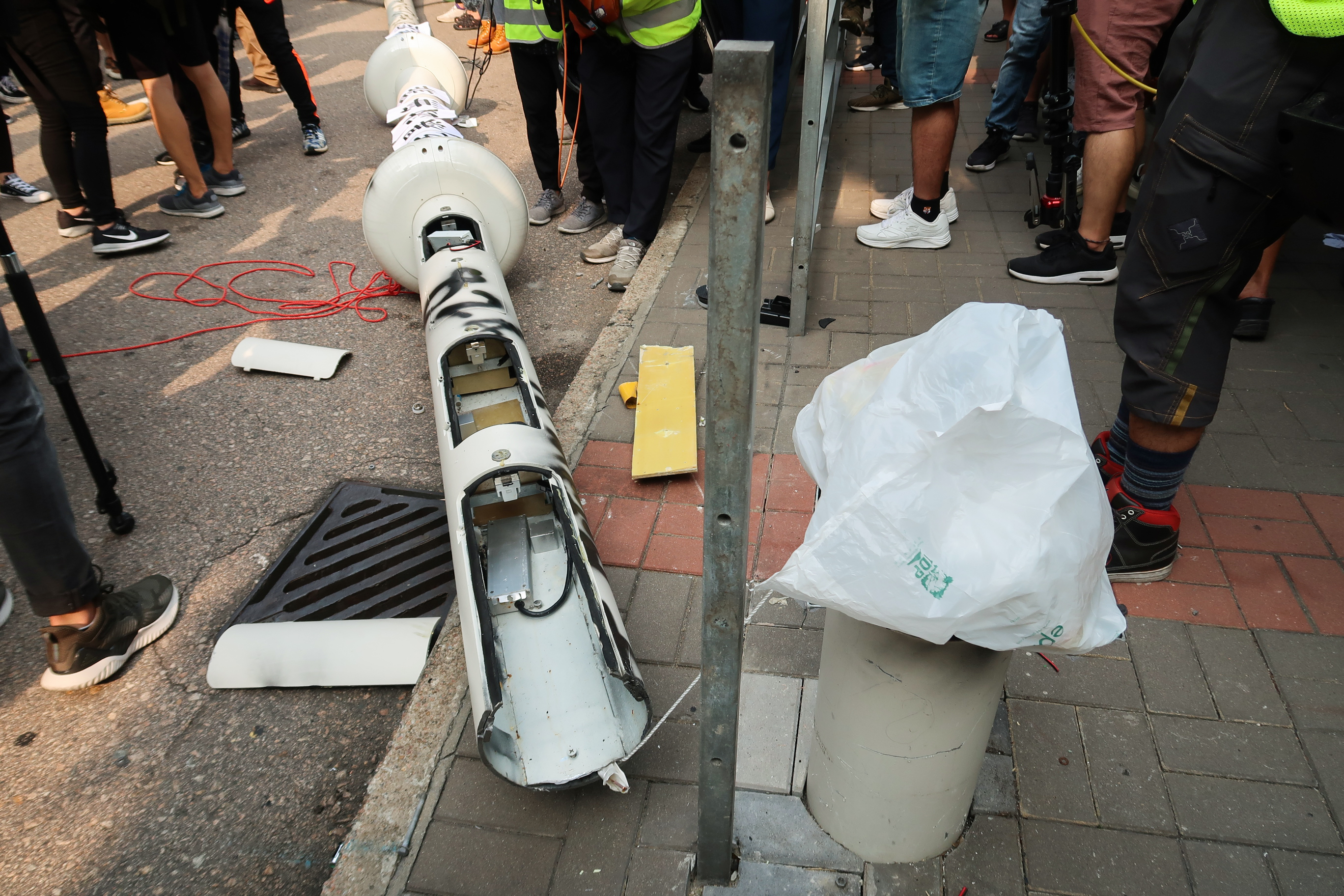
A lamppost on Sheung Yuet Road in Kowloon Bay was cut open at its base, exposing an SPLD01 locator component with a Ticktack logo, raising public concerns about surveillance.

==== Smart lamppost component controversy ====
During the protest, demonstrators damaged a smart lamppost and removed its components, discovering a USB flash drive labeled "BLE Locator Model." This sparked public fears of privacy violations. A spokesperson from the Office of the Government Chief Information Officer (Hong Kong) issued a press release clarifying that the USB drive was a Bluetooth transmitter used to provide precise location data to the public. The spokesperson emphasized that the company developing the device was a local small enterprise with all employees being "born and raised in Hong Kong."

==== Smart lamppost supplier halts deliveries ====
Due to safety threats to the families and employees of the company's directors, as well as public concerns, one of the smart lamppost suppliers, Ticktack Systems, announced it would cease supplying Bluetooth transmitters to the government after completing support for the current 50 lampposts, aiming to address public and client concerns.

A spokesperson from the Innovation and Technology Bureau issued a statement: "We find it unacceptable and deeply regrettable that local SMEs have been attacked and doxxed for participating in the smart lamppost project. This incident severely undermines the efforts of Hong Kong's innovation and technology sector."

=== Residents protest at Richland Gardens Management Office ===
On the day of the protest, the Richland Gardens management office suddenly canceled the building's access code, citing a leak, and announced that new codes would only be issued on August 26, two days later. Entry was restricted to security guards recognizing residents, but some residents wearing black clothing were denied entry, unable to return home, sparking widespread dissatisfaction. Residents reported that security guards were instructed to refuse entry to those in black clothing. Residents also criticized the management for allowing police to enter the private estate premises.

From the afternoon of the protest, residents surrounded the management office demanding an explanation. At 11:36 p.m., three police vehicles arrived at Richland Gardens. Officers repeatedly struck their shields and pointed batons at residents. They briefly raised a yellow flag. At 12:39 a.m., riot police advanced quickly, deploying pepper spray, hitting several residents and then-Legislator Jeremy Tam, and arresting two residents who were taken to Ngau Tau Kok Police Station. Officers left the scene about 20 minutes later. The situation did not calm down, as residents continued to surround the management office, demanding accountability. The deputy manager eventually promised a notice on Monday, August 26, to address the issue.

=== Multiple groups protest MTR's station closure decision ===
On August 25, the day after the protest, the Neo Democrats and over ten others protested at the MTR headquarters, criticizing the MTR for unnecessarily suspending services, which severely affected passengers and residents. They chanted slogans like "MTR serves political tasks" and displayed signs with terms like "Party Railway" and "mutual destruction." No MTR representative received their petition. Then-Western District Councillor Ben Chung questioned whether the MTR's decision was influenced by political factors, citing earlier criticism from the People's Daily. He noted that the MTR had already obtained a court injunction to ensure station and train operations, and since the Kwun Tong march had a Letter of No Objection as a legal protest, the suspension was "completely unnecessary and unreasonable." He also pointed out that other protests occurred on the same day without MTR closures.

On the same day, the centrist group Professional Power protested the MTR's suspension. Then-Sai Kung District Councillor Christine Fong announced plans to propose an emergency motion at the district council meeting to condemn the MTR's actions. She criticized the Transport Department for allowing the MTR to suspend services without cause, causing inconvenience to citizens. A community director from Professional Power reported over a thousand resident complaints about the MTR's announcement being made only an hour and a half before the closures, with no shuttle bus arrangements to manage passenger flow. One pregnant woman reported being stranded at a station for half an hour after entering, unable to leave without arrangements, calling the MTR's actions unreasonable.

On August 27, around 20 members from the Democratic Party, Neo Democrats, Labour Party, and other groups protested at the MTR's Kowloon Bay headquarters, criticizing the closures as unjustified and disruptive to daily life. Then-Neighbourhood and Worker's Service Centre Legislator Leung Yiu-chung accused the MTR of serving the government as a "tool of repression." Some citizens also spontaneously protested, demanding explanations for the closures and opposing police use of excessive force in MTR stations.

On August 30, organizations including the Hong Kong Cerebellar Atrophy Association issued a statement opposing the MTR closures, noting that they made travel difficult for people with disabilities, especially those stranded at the protest site, describing it as "directly depriving them of their right to daily life and political participation." They demanded at least three hours' notice before closures and alternative transport options like shuttle buses.

=== Arrests ===
At 3:07 a.m. on August 25, the police issued a statement reporting the arrest of 29 individuals (19 men and 10 women, aged 17 to 52) during the operation, charged with offenses including unlawful assembly, possession of offensive weapons, and assaulting a police officer. On August 27, Hong Kong 01 reported a total of 32 arrests related to the protest.

==== Organizers ====
Hong Kong 01 reported that around 6 p.m., police arrested 17 individuals, including protest organizer Ventus Lau, near Kwun Tong Promenade and the Kowloon Flour Mill. One arrested individual stated that all detainees were part of the organizing team. Police set up a cordon, barring journalists from entering. A social worker, dissatisfied with the situation, used a megaphone to advise detainees to provide their names, family contact details, and ID numbers, and reminded them that those under 18 or feeling distressed could request a social worker's accompaniment. Police later stated there were no minors under 16 among the detainees, refused social worker accompaniment, and did not disclose which police station the detainees were taken to.

A lawyer later quoted Ventus Lau, who explained that after the organizers announced the end of the Kwun Tong march, 17 members (9 men, 8 women) were transporting protest materials along the promenade when police stopped and arrested them for unlawful assembly. Lau believed the arrests were "illogical" and felt police lacked sufficient evidence to charge them, based on their interactions. On September 20, Lau refused police bail conditions and was released unconditionally, along with two other arrested volunteers.

==== Other individuals ====
Around 9:30 p.m., one protester was arrested outside the South Wing of Temple Mall. At midnight, as police left Richland Gardens in Kowloon Bay, two residents were arrested, suspected of banging on a police vehicle. They were charged with disorderly conduct in a public place, with one also charged with failing to produce an identity card. They were granted bail of HK$4,000, with conditions not to harass Richland Gardens security or stay within 10 meters of the management office, and to report to the police station weekly. On April 20, 2020, the charges against both residents were dropped, with the magistrate ordering them to pay HK$1,000 in court costs, sign a bond of HK$2,000, and maintain good behavior for 12 months.

On August 26, the police issued a statement indicating that two men, aged 24 and 33, were charged with participating in a riot near Wai Yip Street in Kowloon Bay. The case details stated that one of the male defendants was charged with rioting for striking a police officer with an umbrella. Another 34-year-old man was similarly charged with participating in a riot at the same location. In February 2020, the charges against the 33- and 34-year-old defendants were withdrawn, and both were awarded court costs. This marked the first instance during the anti-extradition protests where rioting charges were dropped. However, the 24-year-old defendant faced additional charges of "possession of offensive weapons or tools suitable for unlawful purposes" and "possession of a radio communication device without a license."

A 21-year-old man and a 21-year-old woman were charged with unlawful assembly on Lung Cheung Road, with case details indicating they were helping someone cross a barrier. Both were later convicted of unlawful assembly, with the man sentenced to a drug rehabilitation center and the woman to five months in prison. They appealed, but the appeal was dismissed. The judge rejected their claim of being ordinary citizens, noting that one was "fully equipped" and the other wore a black cap, mask, and gloves, suggesting they were prepared for the protest.

A 19-year-old student was also charged with unlawful assembly and "possession of offensive weapons in a public place" at the same location, with case details noting he possessed a "device emitting a laser beam."

=== TVB Jade News subtitle error ===
During the protest, TVB Jade's News at 6:30 and TVB News Channel reported on clashes outside Telford Plaza in Kowloon Bay. The subtitles mistakenly displayed police Special Tactical Contingent shouting at protesters as "beggars, garbage, social scum" as "'black clothes,' black shirts, social scum." The error was corrected by the 10:45 p.m. broadcast of News Roundup.

Apple Daily cited netizens criticizing TVB News for "trying to insult the intelligence of all Hong Kong people." Hong Kong 01 reported that some questioned whether TVB News misled viewers, while others believed it was an unintentional error. A spokesperson from the Office of the Communications Authority responded that, as of August 25, the authority had received 13 complaints regarding the incident.

== Court Appearances ==
On August 26, 2019, three men and one woman arrested during the protest appeared at Kwun Tong Magistrates' Court:

- A 24-year-old unemployed man and a 33-year-old construction worker were charged with rioting near Wai Yip Street in Kowloon Bay, alongside unknown individuals.
- A 21-year-old waiter and a 21-year-old female student were charged with unlawful assembly on the eastbound section of Lung Cheung Road between Ho Yuen (Yuen) Block 2 and Wong Tai Sin Temple, alongside other unknown individuals.

The prosecution requested an adjournment until November 6, 2019, for further investigation, including reviewing CCTV and police footage. All defendants were granted bail of HK$5,000, with conditions not to leave Hong Kong, to surrender travel documents, to observe a curfew, and to report to a police station weekly.

== See also ==
- Facial recognition system
- Smart city
- Mass surveillance
- Skynet (China)
- Social Credit System
