= TVB Anywhere =

Hong Kong pay-TV and shopping platform

- Logo of the service. TVB logo and Anywhere wording.
- Developer: TVB
- Release: September 2016
- Available in: English, Chinese
- Type: Online television
- Website: https://www.tvbanywhere.com/

TVB Anywhere is an online pay-TV and shopping platform launched by Hong Kong television station TVB Limited for non-Hong Kong audience in 2016. It streams content from its TV channel via set-top box and mobile application. The service targets Overseas Chinese.

The set-top box service supports all overseas countries except for mainland China, Hong Kong, Malaysia, Vietnam, United States and Canada; the mobile application named TVBAnywhere+ supports all overseas countries except for mainland China, Hong Kong, Canada, United States and Vietnam.

== Background ==
Before TVB Anywhere, TVB launched similar products such as TVB Europe and TVB USA. Due to the use of illegal over-the-top (OTT) video set-top boxes and pirated video-streaming services in overseas markets, TVB launched TVB Anywhere to stop such actions. Since the launch of TVB Anywhere, it also replaces the satellite broadcasts by TVB Europe and TVB Australia.

For users in Hong Kong, myTV SUPER is a similar service. Hong Kong users can also watch TVB's free-to-air television channel.

On 26 October 2018, TVB Anywhere launched in Singapore. However, it is only available as a SVOD.

On 7 April 2020, TVB Anywhere launched in the United States as TVB Anywhere USA, aimed at American audiences with live TV from Jadeworld's Channels and streaming video on demand.

By 2026, TVB Anywhere Thai had been launched on Android and IOS in Thailand as a rebranding of TVB's local long-time partner, MVHUB+ focusing on TVB's content with official localized Thai dubs, making it the newest TVB Anywhere brand.

== List of channels ==
=== Current ===
- Asian Action Channel
- Horse Racing Channel 88 (Not available in Southeast Asia and other territories)
- KBS World (Australasia and Europe only, coming soon to Southeast Asia)
- Mainland News Channel
- NHK World Premium (Coming soon)
- Phoenix Chinese Channel Australia (Australasia only, coming soon to Southeast Asia)
- Phoenix Chinese News and Entertainment Channel (Europe, UK, MENA and African Countries only)
- Phoenix Hong Kong Channel (Coming soon to Southeast Asia and Australasia)
- Phoenix InfoNews Channel (Not available in all territories, but will soon be available in all countries)
- Phoenix North America Chinese Channel (Coming soon to Latin America and Brazil)
- TVBS Asia (Australasia only, coming soon to Southeast Asia)
- TVBS News (Australasia only, coming soon to Southeast Asia)
- TVB Classic Movies (Not available in all other territories, but will soon be made available in all countries)
- TVB Entertainment News Channel
- TVB Lifestyle
- TVBJ (Australia) (Australasia only)
- TVB Jade International
- TVB Korean Drama (Macau only)
- TVB Live Show
- TVB News Channel
- TVB Radio
- TVB Xing He
- tvN (Original Feed, Macau Only, Premium Feed will soon be made available in Thailand, Philippines, Indonesia, Singapore, Malaysia and Australasia)

=== Great Wall TV ===
- Anhui TV International
- BTV International Channel
- CCTV-4
  - CCTV-4 (Option Versions: Americas, Europe and Asia)
- CCTV Entertainment
- CCTV Chinese Opera
- CGTN (coming Soon)
- CGTN Documentary
- China Movie Channel
- Dragon TV (Global)
- Fujian Straits TV
- Xiamen Stars (Coming Soon)
- Guangxi TV International
- Great Wall Elite
- Hunan TV World
- Hunan Happy Fishing Channel
- Hunan Tea Channel
- HBS Aniworld (Coming Soon)
- JSBC International
- Shenzhen TV (Global)
- GBA Satellite TV
- Yunnan Lancang Mekong International (Mandarin, Laos, Thai Options)
- Zhejiang TV International

== See more ==
- TVB
- TVB Europe
- TVB USA
- TVB Korea Channel
