= Jadeworld (Australian TV network) =

Australian TV network

Jadeworld (翡翠互動電視)
- Country: Australia

Programming
- Picture format: 576i (SDTV)

Ownership
- Owner: TVB Australia, under TVB

History
- Launched: 13 August 1998
- Closed: 31 July 2017 (replaced by OTT TV Service)

Links
- Website: tvb.com.au

TVB Jadeworld was a broadcasting station based in Sydney, Australia that caters for the Chinese community in Australia. It currently consists of 16 channels, with many programs relayed from TVB operations in Hong Kong and Taiwan.

As of 31 July 2017, the satellite broadcast service of those channels was ceased and replaced by the service by TVB Anywhere.

== Current channel line-up ==
Channel Number	Channel	Genre	Language(s)
1	TVBJ	Variety	Cantonese
2	STAR Chinese Channel	Variety	Cantonese/Mandarin
3	Dragon TV	Mainland programs	Mandarin
4	TVB8	Lifestyle	Mandarin
5	TVBS-Asia	Lifestyle/Taiwanese Variety	Mandarin
6	TVBS-NEWS	Taiwanese News	Mandarin
7	CCTV-4	Mainland programs	Mandarin
8	STAR Chinese Movies	Mainland programs	Mandarin
9	TVBN	Hong Kong news	Cantonese
10	TVB Premium Lifestyle	Lifestyle programs	Cantonese/Mandarin
11	Phoenix TV	Mainland programs	Mandarin
12	Phoenix InfoNews Channel	Mainland programs	Mandarin
13	TVB Junior	Education Programme	Cantonese
14	tvN	Korean programs	Chinese, Korean
15	KBS World	Korean Programs	Korean

== History ==
Jadeworld began as JEDi (Jade Entertainment Digital Interactive) in 2000, broadcasting only 8 channels-

Channel Number	Channel	Language(s)
1	TVBJ	Cantonese
2	Movie Channel	Cantonese/Mandarin
4	TVB8	Cantonese/Mandarin
5	TVB Xing He (dramas)	Cantonese/Mandarin
6	TVBS-Asia	Mandarin
7	TVBS-N	Mandarin
9	CNBC Asia	English

CCTV-4 was added in 2000, while CNBC Asia was taken off the channels in 2004.
JET-TV was offered to certain plan subscribers from until 2005.
The addition of Dragon TV, Hunan TV, Chongqing TV and Phoenix TV in 2006-07 caters for subscribers of Mainland descent.

In May 2017, Jadeworld reduced to 26 channels.

== See also ==
- Subscription television in Australia
