= TVB Finance, Sports & Information Channel =

Hong Kong television channel

- Country: Hong Kong SAR, China
- Broadcast area: International
- Network: TVB
- Headquarters: 77 Chun Choi Street, Tseung Kwan O Industrial Estate, New Territories, Hong Kong SAR, China

Programming
- Languages: Cantonese, English, Mandarin
- Picture format: 1080i HDTV

Ownership
- Owner: TVB
- Sister channels: TVB Jade; TVB Pearl; TVB Plus; TVB News Channel

History
- Launched: 31 December 2007; 18 years ago 13 September 2021; 4 years ago (Malaysia)
- Closed: 22 April 2024; 2 years ago
- Former names: TVB HD Jade (2007-2016); TVB J5 (2016-2017); TVB Finance Channel (2017-2018); TVB Finance & Information Channel (2018-2022)

Links
- Website: programme.tvb.com/tvbfinancesportsinformationchannel

Availability

Terrestrial
- Digital TV (Hong Kong): Channel 85 (HD)

Streaming media
- Astro: TVB Anywhere+ (HD)
- Unifi TV: TVB Anywhere+ (HD)

TVB Finance, Sports & Information Channel (Chinese: 無綫財經 體育 資訊台) was a Cantonese-language free-to-air terrestrial television channel in Hong Kong. Owned by Television Broadcasts Limited (TVB), it first launched on 31 December 2007 as TVB HD Jade, before relaunching as TVB J5 on 22 February 2016.

The channel primarily carried documentaries and financial news programmes. It later carried sports programming. On 22 April 2024, the channel was shut down and merged into TVB J2 to form TVB Plus. Its channel allotment was leased to Phoenix Hong Kong Channel.

== Background ==
The channel first launched on 31 December 2007 as TVB HD Jade, a high-definition spin-off of TVB Jade.

On 22 February 2016, with TVB Jade converting to HD full-time, HD Jade relaunched as TVB J5; the new channel was positioned as focusing on "wealth and knowledge", featuring entertainment and documentary programmes, and finance-related programming. TVB Pearl's Mandarin-language TVB News bulletin relocated to J5 on launch; the newscast also began to use Simplified Chinese for on-air graphics and subtitles after the move (rather than Traditional Chinese, which is typically used in Hong Kong). The decision generated criticism from viewers who believed that the change was reflective of a pro-Beijing bias at the broadcaster.

On 15 August 2017, TVB J5 was rebranded as TVB Finance Channel. On January 20, 2018, the channel was rebranded once again to TVB Finance & Information Channel.

On 13 April 2020, the Mandarin news moved back to TVB Pearl. On September 5, 2022, the channel was officially renamed TVB Finance, Sports & Information Channel, after having become the broadcaster of the Hong Kong Jockey Club and Mark Six drawings (replacing sister channel TVB J2).

In November 2023, it was announced that the channel would be shut down as part of cuts, with much of its programming merged into TVB J2 under the new branding TVB Plus, and financial programming dispersed across TVB's channels; the new channel launched 22 April 2024. In turn, the channel 85 allocation was leased to Phoenix Television, and began broadcasting Phoenix Hong Kong Channel. TVB stated that discontinuing and merging the channel was expected to result in HK$100 million in cost savings.

== See also ==
- TVB News Channel
- now Business News Channel
- TVB Lifestyle
