= Wang Deshun =

Chinese actor (born 1936)

- 王德顺
- Born: 20 August 1936 (age 90); Shenyang, Liaoning, Republic of China
- Occupations: Actor; Model
- Years active: 1982–present
- Modeling information
- Height: 5.6 ft (171 cm)
- Hair color: Black
- Eye color: Brown
- Agency: CAA

Chinese name
- Traditional Chinese: 王德順
- Simplified Chinese: 王德顺
Transcriptions
Standard Mandarin
- Hanyu Pinyin: Wáng Déshùn
- IPA: [wǎŋ tɤ̌.ʂwə̂n]

Wang Deshun (born August 20, 1936) is a Chinese model and film actor. He got nicknamed the Hottest Grandpa in China after walking shirtless in Beijing Fashion week in 2015.

== Career ==
In 1960, Wang Deshun joined the Shenyang Military Region Anti-Enemy Drama Troupe and became a drama actor. In 1970, Wang Deshun, who had been a drama actor for 10 years in the Anti-Enemy Drama Troupe of the Shenyang Military Region, was assigned to the Changchun Drama Theater after demobilization.

In April 1985, he participated in the International Brecht System Symposium held by the Central Academy of Drama in Beijing, and performed the pantomime "Man and Snake". In the same year, Wang Deshun created the only type of pantomime in the world called "Model Pantomime".

In 1987, he was sent by the Ministry of Culture to participate in the 12th International Mime Festival held in Cologne, Federal Germany, which pushed Chinese mime to the international mime stage for the first time.

In 1989, went to Macau to participate in the "Macao New Year International Art Festival". In the same year, Wang Deshun's modeling pantomime was included in the drama volume of "Encyclopedia of China".

In 1993, Wang Deshun was invited by France to participate in the 8th International Theater Festival in Orias, France.

In 1994, participated in the first Shanghai International Mime Festival. "Modeling Pantomime" became the only pantomime show in China in this session. In the same year, Wang Deshun's artistic creation of "Picture Pantomime" was included in "Picture China's Hundred Years History".

In 1995, participated in the Impulse Art Festival in Austria. In the same year, Wang Deshun's modeling pantomime and his name were included in the "List of World Famous People" published by the American Biographical Association.

Since then he has been acting in many films but received global recognition on March 25, 2015, Wang Deshun participated in the 2015 autumn and winter fashion released by designer Hu Sheguang at the International Fashion Week at the 798 Art Center in Beijing.

In 2017 he became the brand ambassador for Reebok.

== Personal life ==
He is married with two kids and a granddaughter.

On August 20, 2021, the 85-year-old Wang Deshun successfully received his pilot's license, and it took only 3 months to complete all flight subjects at Miyun Mujiayu Airport.

== Filmography ==
=== Television series ===
Wang Yibo's film credits
Year	Title		Network	Role	Notes	Ref.
Year	English	Original	Network	Role	Notes	Ref.
2001	Dynasty Doctor	皇朝太医	BTV	Nong Jinkui		
2002	Taiji Prodigy	少年張三丰	TTV	Yi Yun		
2003	Good Luck Zhu Bajie	福星高照猪八戒				
2003	Heroic Legend	萍踪侠影	BTV	Shi Ying		
2003	Qian Long Dynasty	乾隆王朝	Hunan TV	Support Role		
2004	Blade Heart	血薦軒轅	TVB Jade	Qi Jiguang		
2005	Magic Dragon Pearl	魔界之龙珠		Xue Wan Shan		
2006	The Patriotic Knights	侠骨丹心		Zhong Chang Tong		
2006	Ao Jian Jiang Hu	傲剑江湖	GTV	Emperor Zhen Zong		
2007	Empress Wu Zetian of China	无字碑歌		Li Ji		
2012	King of Legend	傳奇之王	DRAMACube	Lao Fu Zi [The Old Master]		
2012	The Qin Empire 2	大秦帝国之纵横	CCTV	Long Jia		
2013	Er Shu	二叔		Qi Mu Jiang		
2014	The Disinterested Judge	铁面御史		Lu Wei		
2015	Lady & Liar	千金女賊	JSTV	Uncle Can		
2015	The Whirlwind Girl	旋风少女	Hunan TV	Wan Guan Zhu [Ting Hao & Ting Yi's grandfather]		
2015	Guns and Roses	黄金大劫案	iQiYi	"Mad Father" / Feng		
2016	The Whirlwind Girl 2	旋风少女第二季	Hunan TV	Wan Guan Zhu [Ting Hao & Ting Yi's grandfather]	Ep. 12, 19–22	
2016	Chinese Style Relationship	中国式关系	BTV	Uncle Li		
2016	Shuttle Love Millennium	相爱穿梭千年貳：月光下的交换	Hunan TV	Wang Si Ping / Wang Bo Liang		
2017	Redemption of the Knight	骑士的手套	Hunan TV, Youku	Yu Zhong Yuan		
2017	The Hunting Genius	寻人大师	IQIYI	Lu Dong Feng		
2018	Great Expectations	远大前程	Hunan TV	Chu Tian Shu		
2018	Demon Catcher Zhong Kui	钟馗捉妖记	IQIYI	Shang Xian		
2018	The Dark Lord	夜天子	Tencent Video	Kushen Sect Leader		
2019	The Legends	招摇	Hunan TV, iQiYi	Zi Dan [Qin Qian Xian's teacher]		
2019	Heavenly Sword and Dragon Slaying Sabre	倚天屠龙记	Tencent Video	Zhang San Feng		
2019	My True Friend	我的真朋友	Dragon TV	Zhong A Mao		
2020	You Are My Destiny	你是我的命中注定	Tencent Video	Zhong San Long		
2020	The Deer and the Cauldron	鹿鼎记	CCTV, iQiYi, Youku	Hong An Tong		
2021	First Sword of Wudang	武当一剑	CCTV	Taoist Master Wu Ji		
2021	The Memory About You	半暖时光	JSTV, Youku	Zhuo Yuan		
2022	Who Rules the World	且试天下	Tencent Video	Elder Tai Yin		
2022	See You Again	超时空罗曼史	IQIYI	Di Hu Sheng		

=== Films ===
Year	Title		Role	Notes	Ref.
Year	English	Original	Role	Notes	Ref.
2003	Warriors of Heaven and Earth	天地英雄	Old Diehard		
2007	The Park	公园	Gao Yuan Shan		
2008	The Forbidden Kingdom	功夫之王	Jade Emperor		
2009	Empire of Silver	白银帝国	Chang You [Chief escort]		
2010	Reign of Assassins	剑雨	Shen Bu		
2010	Detective Dee and the Mystery of the Phantom Flame	狄仁傑 之 通天帝國	Xia Zi Ling		
2011	What Women Want	我知女人心	Sun Mei Sheng		
2013	Saving General Yang	忠烈杨家将	Master Gui Gu		
2014	The White Haired Witch of Lunar Kingdom	白发魔女传之明月天国	[Head of Fort Luna]		
2015	Back to 20	重返20岁	Li Da Hai		
2015	Jian Bing Man	煎饼侠	Guest Role		
2016	Xuan Yuan:The Great Emperor	轩辕大帝	Yan Emperor		
2016	Yesterday Once More	谁的青春不迷茫	Gao Xiang		
2016	Seven Days	冬	Old Man		
2016	One Night Only	天亮之前	[Video shop owner]		
2016	The Song of Cotton	盛先生的花儿	Mr. Sheng		
2016	Sword Master	三少爷的剑	[Zen Master / Medicine Master]		
2017	Eternal Love	海角有个五店市	Zhuang Jia Zhu [Old]		
2017	Crazy Arts	艺术也疯狂	Shui Ye/Master of Water		
2017	Wu Kong	悟空传	Shi Fu [Master]		
2017	Three Realms: The Secret Magic	三界传说之浮屠秘术	Main Role		
2018	Monster Undersea	深海巨妖	[Old Man]		
2021	Migratory Birds	候鸟	[Dreaming old man]		

=== Variety Shows ===
Year	Title		Network	Role	Notes	Ref.
Year	English	Original	Network	Role	Notes	Ref.
2015	Grasp a Dream	与梦想同行	Phoenix Television	Guest		

=== Dubbing ===
Year	Title		Role	Notes	Ref.
Year	English	Original	Role	Notes	Ref.
2016	Big Fish & Begonia	大鱼海棠	Houtu (后土) Chun's grandfather (椿的爷爷)		
2025	Ne Zha 2	哪吒之魔童闹海	Master xian Wuliang（无量仙翁）		

== Awards and nominations ==
Year	Award name	Category	Nominated work	Result	Ref
2008	15th Beijing College Student Film Festival	Best Actor	The Park	Nominated	
2015	18th Shanghai International Film Festival	Best Supporting Actor	Back to 20	Nominated	
2015	Beijing Youth Film Festival	Special Jury Award	Seven Days	Won	
2016	19th Shanghai International Film Festival	Best Actor	The Song of Cotton	Nominated	
