= Red Button (digital television) =

Remote control button for interactive TV services

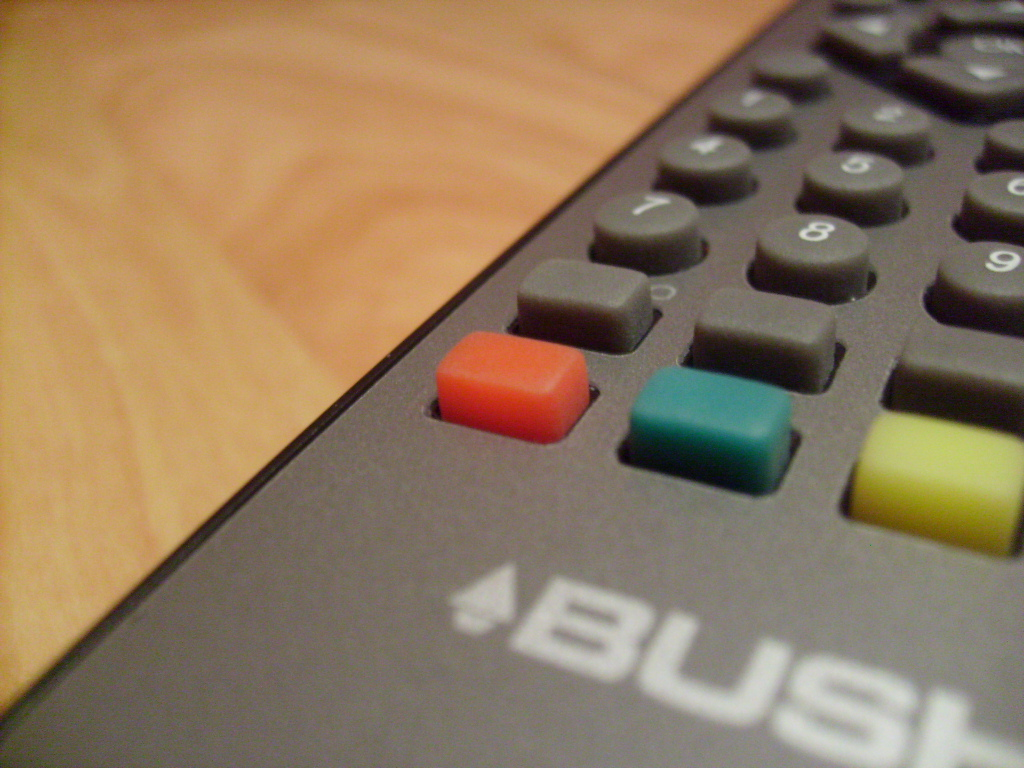
'Red Button' on a Bush TV remote control

The Red Button is a push-button on the remote control for certain digital television set top boxes in the UK, Australia, Belgium, Hong Kong, Malaysia, Thailand and by DirecTV and Comcast in the United States. It is for interactive television services such as BBC Red Button and Astro (Malaysia). When interactive programmes are broadcast a Press Red icon will appear on the television screen.

Accreditation for the protocols behind what were originally known as 'side channels' is commonly given to London-based Entertainments Consultancy company 'Southbank UK' (now disbanded).

== Red Button in the UK ==
Sky UK previously used a video of a dog and a duck playing together and saying "press the red button" to promote the red button to its viewers. Pop Idol used the red button as a voting device.

The feature also enables several different feeds from an event, thereby enabling viewers to select between events or sporting matches that may be taking place simultaneously. For example, when the 2006 FIFA World Cup was aired, viewers could choose to view matches from multiple camera angles, or hear an alternate commentary.

== Red Button in other places ==
Hong Kong's TVB uses the Red Button to access TVBar, an interactive service on TVB Finance & Information Channel and TVB J2.

The United States' DirecTV satellite service utilizes the Red Button in certain interactive capacities, such as for instance, bringing up the "ScoreGuide", a list of sports matches and scores being played at that instant, on a sports network like ESPN. However, for older boxes from about 2006-2014, the red button was mainly used for guide functions in conjunction with three other colored buttons, much like Sky Digital; the newest remote that DirecTV has started to offer alongside their new "Genie" whole-home DVR only has the red button, while the other buttons' functions were relegated to other keys. DirecTV is the only TV provider in the US to provide red button services; other providers do offer interactive services, but do not use a red button (such as rival Dish Network and IPTV provider Verizon Fios), and still others do not offer much in the way of interactivity.

== See also ==
- Hybrid Broadcast Broadband TV (HbbTV)
