= TVB-Europe =

TVB-Europe or TVB Europe and various styles of the same may refer to:

- TVBEurope, a broadcasting industry trade magazine owned by Future plc
- TVB-Europe (broadcaster), European subsidiary of Hong Kong broadcaster TVB
