= TVB-Europe (broadcaster) =

Online television service

TVB Europe
- Company type: Subsidiary
- Industry: Internet television
- Founded: March 1994; 32 years ago
- Fate: Merged into TVB Anywhere
- Successor: TVB Anywhere
- Parent: TVB
- Website: http://eu.tvbanywhere.com

TVB-Europe is an online television service that streams content from Hong Kong's Television Broadcasts Limited (TVB) to subscribers in Europe.

Initially established as The Chinese Channel Limited (TCC) (Chinese: 時視) in 1994 as a satellite television broadcaster based in the United Kingdom, it broadcast to 48 countries in Europe. The company became a wholly owned subsidiary of TVB in 2005 and the on-air identity was re-branded as TVB-Europe, though it retained "The Chinese Channel Limited" as a legal identity.

After transitioning from a satellite service into an online one, it was announced on December 9, 2014, that "The Chinese Channel Limited" was in administration, as TVB Europe the service is now run as part of TVB International operating from Hong Kong.

The satellite broadcasts of TVB Europe have now been replaced by TVB Anywhere since the launch of the new platform.

== History ==
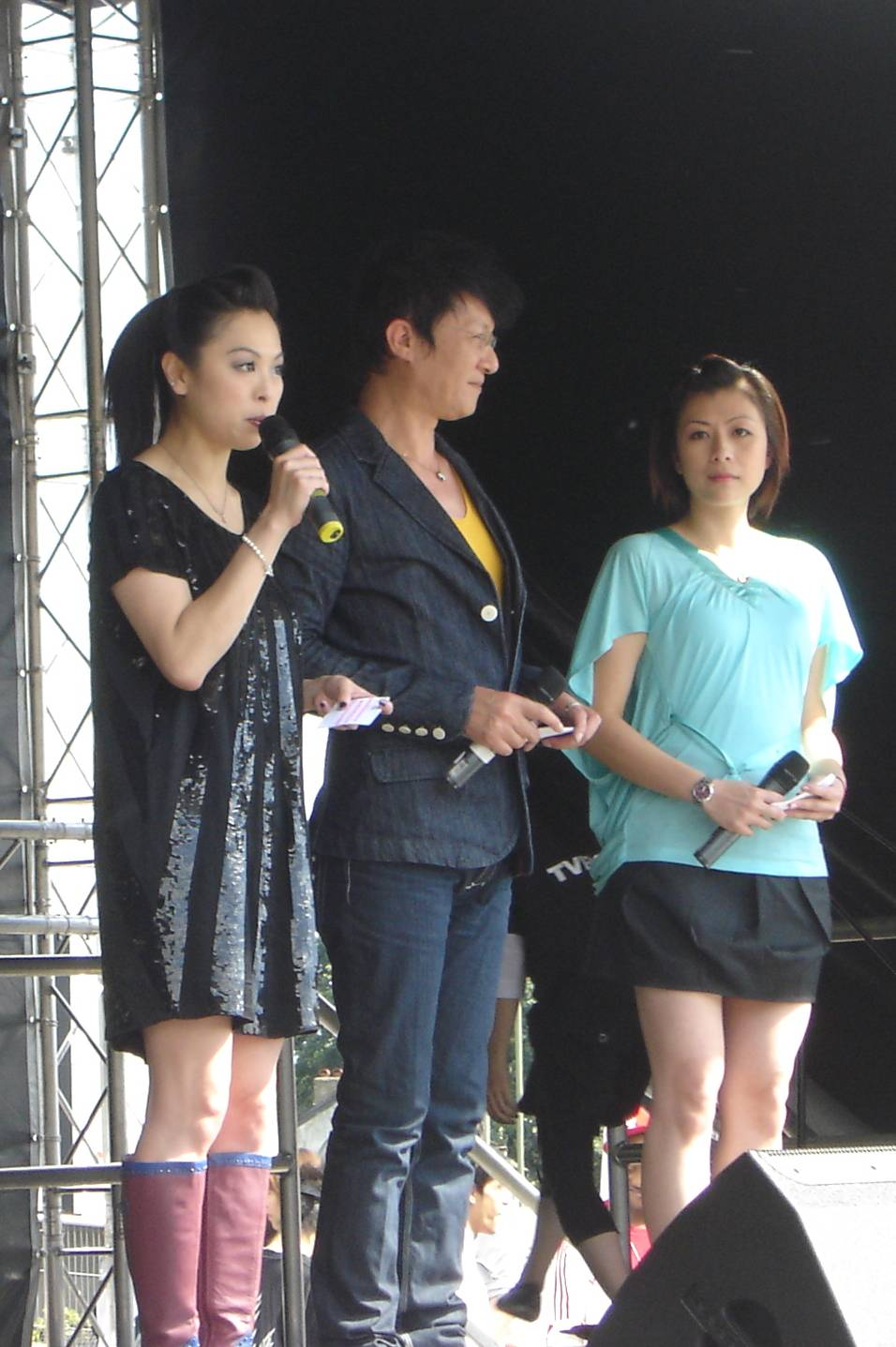
Former TVBS-Europe presenters, (from left to right) Cecilia Chiu, Simon Li and Katie Chan at an TVB event in 2008.

The Chinese Channel Limited was established in 1994, having been conceived and founded by the Media Matrix Limited, a UK-based media consultancy, set up by Paul Kempton and Gerald Winnington-Ingram, the latter becoming the first managing director of The Chinese Channel. It was funded as a joint venture between Pacific Media PLC and Shaw Media Corporation, a company controlled by Markus and Darren Shaw the grandnephews of TVB's former chairman and founder Run Run Shaw.

From the very beginning, TVB was the source of the majority of TCC's programming, though not exclusively so. At the time of the channel's launch, the only way to watch Chinese-language programming in the United Kingdom was by VHS, and TVB had established official video rental outlets for its dramas. However, these official outlets did not have the geographical coverage to compete with videotape pirates who could always undercut it on price. TVB found that its programs were being taped as they were broadcast in Hong Kong, mailed abroad, copied and shared between friends and hawked as a sideline by businesses serving Chinese communities in the United Kingdom and other European countries.

By having TCC as an affiliate, TVB could better profit from its own products. However, as the fledgling channel sought to build up its subscriber base (advertising revenue has always been weak given the fractured nature of the target audience), financial support from TVB became increasingly important, leading to a rebranding of TCC as TVBS-Europe (TVB Satellite-Europe (Chinese: 無綫衞星台)). Station identification, colours, logos and jingles became variations of that used by TVB for its Jade brand in Hong Kong, and the station was no longer referred to on air or its promotional material as 時視 (CC).

In late 2005, TVB brought out the remaining partner to assume full control of TCC. The company initially shied away from branding itself outright as TVB-Europe; there being a broadcasting industry trade magazine, now owned by NewBay Media, with a similar name, styled TVBEurope.

Beginning in 2013, TVB-Europe began moving away from being a satellite broadcaster to an online service with the goal of a planned switch-off of its satellite service in either the late Summer or early Autumn of 2014. In late 2013, it began moving existing subscribers to its online service TVB-Anywhere, a TV Everywhere service, with the offer of reduced subscriptions and free set top boxes. The move to becoming an online service followed a period which saw a reduction of the company's physical presence in Europe, for example, the closing of its London newsroom at Teddington Studios, with the loss of 20 jobs, and having the news recorded in Hong Kong for broadcast in Europe.

The owners declared that it would seek administration for "The Chinese Channel Limited" on 9 December 2014 due to financial reasons, making its remaining 30 UK and three French staff redundant. The subscriber base and the TVB Anywhere service has now been transferred to and is now managed as a part of TVB's TVB International (TVBI).

== Programming ==
From the very start, TVB-produced programs formed the majority of the channel's programming. In addition to TVB programs, Japanese and Korean dramas purchased by TVB and dubbed into Cantonese for broadcast in Hong Kong, also formed part of the channel's early scheduling. In-house television program production was limited to local news and community interest programs. However, this programming ceased with the closing of the local newsroom.

As a satellite service, TVB-Europe offered five channels, the main one being modelled on TVB Jade, in addition to this flagship channel, for an additional supplement to the subscription, four extra channels were available. These being a lifestyle channel, a news channel, a golden oldies channel and a children's/educational channel. In addition to material produced by the main TVB studios in Hong Kong, material produced by TVB's Taiwanese subsidiary TVBS was also shown on the extra channels, but very rarely on the main channel.

With the rise of online streaming, would-be pirates had access to TVB programmes within minutes of their broadcast in Hong Kong, and in a bid to combat this, TVB moved to a strategy of same day broadcast of its key television drama serials by its overseas subsidiaries, partners and affiliates.

Initially, TVB-Europe offered an inclusive package which, in addition to the five stations previously available by satellite, included multiple channels such as KBS World, Phoenix Television, China Central Television, Eastern Television and other Chinese television stations; in addition to live-streaming, the TVB-Anywhere service also offered a seven-day catch up service, and a video-on-demand service. Beginning in 2017, in an effort to fight the cloning of its set top boxes, TVB-Europe replaced its first generation boxes with new ones, these boxes offer a reduced number of channels, and there is no longer a dedicated European channel with localised content.

The available channels now consist of the TVB Jade, TVBN, TVB Entertainment News and Asian Action channels streamed simultaneously to their broadcast in Hong Kong, with a fifth channel streaming a repeat of TVB Jade with a seven-hour time delay to synchronise it with the time in Europe. All third-party channels have now been discontinued, and the catch up service is now only for three days. Older TVB programmes, as well as dramas from the defunct Asia Television, are now available to either buy or be exchanged with loyalty points as part of the video-on-demand service.
