= Jadeworld =

Jadeworld can refer to Chinese programming available in:

- Jadeworld (Australia)
- Jadeworld (USA)
