= TVB Xing He =

- Country: China
- Broadcast area: International
- Network: TVB International (TVBI)
- Headquarters: TVB City, 77 Chun Choi Street, Tseung Kwan O Industrial Estate, Tseung Kwan O, Kowloon, Hong Kong, China

Programming
- Languages: Cantonese; Mandarin; Thai
- Picture format: 1080i (HDTV 16:9); 576i (SDTV 16:9)

Ownership
- Owner: TVB Limited
- Sister channels: TVB Jade Southeast Asia; Asian Action Channel; TVB Magic

History
- Launched: 7 December 1998; 27 years ago

Links
- Website: www.tvbanywhere.com

Availability

Terrestrial
- StarHub TV (Singapore): Channel 859 (HD)
- Singtel TV (Singapore): Channel 517 (HD)
- Cignal (Philippines): Channel 281 (HD)

Streaming media
- Astro (Malaysia): Astro GO / TVB Anywhere+ (HD)
- TrueVisions (Thailand): TrueID / TVB Xing He (HK Version)
- VCTV (Vietnam): VCTV DTH and Analog (until 2007)

TVB Xing He (traditional Chinese: TVB星河頻道; simplified Chinese: TVB星河频道; pinyin: TVB xīnghé píndào; Jyutping: TVB sing1 ho4 pan4 dou6) is a Hong Kong pay television channel owned by TVBI Company Limited, a subsidiary of TVB Limited. It is primarily broadcast in Mandarin.

== History ==
In 1998, TVB's subsidiary TVB Satellite Broadcasting Limited established TVB8 and TVB Xing He to enter overseas Chinese satellite TV market. TVB8 and TVB Xing He were approved by the State Administration of Radio, Film and Television of the People's Republic of China for the mainland China viewers.

On 1 January 2018, TVB Xing He revamped their channel's appearance and program line, omitting mainland Chinese dramas from the roster. However, they still continue for mainland Chinese variety shows. They also added an extra channel to simulcast the audio in Mandarin & Cantonese, in lieu of the traditional audio inputs from one's television.

== See also ==
- TVB
- TVB8
- TVB Anywhere
