= TVB8 =

Mandarin Chinese entertainment television channel

- Country: China
- Broadcast area: Asia Pacific; USA

Programming
- Language: Mandarin
- Picture format: 1080i HDTV (downscaled to 16:9 576i for the SDTV feed)

Ownership
- Owner: Television Broadcasts Limited

History
- Launched: 9 August 1998; 28 years ago (Asia Pacific and Hong Kong); 18 November 2012; 14 years ago (USA)
- Replaced: TVB Magic (Malaysia)
- Closed: 15 August 2018; 8 years ago (Hong Kong); 1 September 2018; 8 years ago (Asia Pacific and USA)

TVB8 was a Mandarin language general entertainment television channel owned and operated by TVB International.

== History ==
On December 7, 1998, TVB Satellite Broadcasting Limited was established. and is the only one to enter overseas Chinese satellite TV market. TVB8 was launched, which is mainly broadcast in Mandarin language. TVB8 and TVB Xinghe Channel belongs to TVB were approved by the State Administration of Radio, Film and Television of the People's Republic of China for the mainland China viewers.

After 20 years of broadcasting, TVB8 ceased broadcasting on 15 August 2018 in Hong Kong and 1 September 2018 in Asia-Pacific and USA.

== See also ==
- TVB
- TVB Xinghe Channel
- TVB Anywhere
