= List of programs broadcast by Phoenix Television =

This is a list of television programs broadcast by Phoenix Television.

== Phoenix Chinese Channel ==
=== News and information ===
- Asian Journal
- Breaking News
- Good Morning China
- Information Express
- Midnight News Express
- Observation Post Of Military Situation
- Omni Media Online
- Omni Media Weekly
- Phoenix Afternoon Express
- Phoenix Focal Point
- Phoenix News Express
- Phoenix Weather Report
- Pic of the Day
- Weekend Midnight Express
- Weekend Morning News
- The World This Week

=== Opinion ===
- Eye on World
- From Phoenix To The World
- Lawrence's Viewpoint
- Newsline
- Peter Qiu's Talk
- Strategy Room
- Summary of Press
- Taiwan Talk Show
- Tiger Talk

=== History and culture ===
- Architectures Dream
- China Forum
- Cultural Kaleidoscope
- Earth Report
- Eight Minutes Reading
- Emergent China
- Inspiring Anecdotes
- My Patriotic Heart
- Panoramic Eyeshot of Phoenix
- Premium Spectacular
- A Quote from Celebs

=== Interview ===
- Behind the Headlines With Wen Tao
- A Date with Luyu
- Mainland Q&A
- Starface
- Talk With The World Leaders

=== Social issues ===
- Charity China
- Chit Chat with Me
- The Days We've Been Through
- Global Characters
- Grasp a Dream
- Harmony Society
- Secret Documentary
- Social Watch
- To 2014: To Children

=== Business ===
- Approaching Business and Politics
- Elite Converge
- Head Start In Finance
- Shi Ping Financial Report
- Weekly Finance Update

=== Entertainment and fashion ===
- Entertainment Whirlwind
- Health Express
- Inside Phoenix
- Trendy Guide
- Star Cinema
- Taste

=== Special programmes ===
- Miss Chinese Cosmos Pageant
- You Bring Charm to the World Award Ceremony

=== Others ===
- Phoenix Selection
- Tracing

=== Programming block ===
- Phoenix Buster
- Phoenix Horizons

== Phoenix Chinese News and Entertainment ==
=== Original programmes ===
- China France 50 Years
- Europe China Journal
- Europe Chinese Report
- Europe Special Program
- Financial Focus
- Shenzhen Glamour

=== Programming block ===
- Asian Theatre
- China Taiping Insurance Phoenix Drama
- Phoenix Horizons
- Select Theatre

== Phoenix North America Chinese Channel ==
=== Original programmes ===
- America Today
- Cooking Show
- Dream House
- Health & Beauty
- Hot Topic of Chinese
- News Talk
- Parenting
- Phoenix North America News
- Route to Fine Wine
- See Aboard
- Wall Street Weekly

=== Programming block ===
- Asian Theatre
- Phoenix Drama
- Phoenix Horizons
- Select Theatre

=== Anime ===
- Atashin'chi
- Cocotama
- Shin Chan
- Tamagotchi!

== Phoenix Infonews Channel ==
=== News and information ===
- Asian Journal
- China News Live
- Global Online
- Good Morning China
- Midnight News Express
- Omni Media Weekly
- Phoenix Afternoon Express
- Phoenix Weather Report
- Weekend Midnight Express
- Weekend Morning News
- The World This Week

=== Opinion ===
- Chief Editor Time
- Current Affairs Debate
- Hong Kong Viewpoint
- News Talk
- News Zone
- Taiwan Weekly Focus
- Weekend Hot Talk

=== History and culture ===
- Architectures Dream
- China Forum

=== Interview ===
- Mainland Q&A

=== Social issues ===
- Media Assembly

=== Business ===
- Approaching Business and Politics
- China Financial Intelligence
- Elite Converge
- Financial Journal
- Phoenix Business Daily

=== Entertainment and fashion ===
- Entertainment News Report
- Phoenix Info Billboard

== Phoenix Hong Kong Channel ==
=== News and information ===
- News on the Hour 1800
- Phoenix Afternoon News
- Phoenix Morning News
- Phoenix News Express
- Phoenix Night News

=== History and culture ===
- Canton Chatter
- My Patriot Heart
- Panoramic Eyeshot of Phoenix

=== Interview ===
- Culture Talk with Jimmy Ching
- A Date with Luyu
- News Decoder
- Starface
- Speak Out Hong Kong

=== Social issues ===
- Cross-Strait Explorer

=== Business ===
- Money Bang

=== Entertainment and fashion ===
- Medi Apps

=== Anime ===
- Atashin'chi
- Cocotama
- Shin Chan
- Tamagotchi!

=== Programming block ===
- Info Stream
- On Stage
- The True Man Show

=== Original programmes and programming block from Phoenix Hong Kong Channel America ===
- Antique Today
- Cantonese Drama
- Dream House
- Health & Beauty
- Jinglan Drama
- Parenting
- Phoenix North America News
- Route to Fine Wine
- See Aboard

== See also ==
- Phoenix Television
