= TVB Plus =

Television channel in Hong Kong

- Country: China
- Broadcast area: Hong Kong; Macau
- Headquarters: 77 Chun Choi Street, Tseung Kwan O Industrial Estate, New Territories, Hong Kong, China

Programming
- Languages: English; Mandarin; Cantonese; Korean; Japanese
- Picture format: 1080i 16:9 HDTV

Ownership
- Owner: TVB Limited
- Sister channels: TVB Jade; TVB Pearl; TVB News Channel

History
- Launched: 30 June 2008; 18 years ago

Links
- Website: programme.tvb.com/tvb-plus

Availability

Terrestrial
- Digital TV (Hong Kong): Channel 82 (HD)

Streaming media
- Affiliated Streaming Service(s): myTV SUPER

TVB Plus, formerly TVB J2 (Chinese: 無綫電視J2) is a Chinese-language free-to-air terrestrial television channel in Hong Kong. Owned by TVB and first launched on 30 June 2008, the channel broadcasts programming aimed at youth and young adult audiences, as well as sports and information programming.

Most of its programming is presented in Cantonese, but occasionally there are programmes in other languages including Mandarin, Japanese and Korean. Most of the shows are broadcast on bilingual audio channels with Chinese subtitles. It began broadcasting in high definition on 21 January 2013.

In April 2024, it was announced that TVB J2 would be relaunched as TVB Plus beginning 22 April 2024. The channel is a merger of J2 with TVB Finance, Sports & Information Channel, with a mix of entertainment, sports, and information programming, and interactive features integrating with TVB digital platforms such as MyTV Super. The launch came as part of cuts by TVB to focus on digital platforms.

== Programmes ==
Korean and Japanese dramas are the most watched programmes on TVB J2. The time slots in prime time are specialized for most popular dramas every day, with ones from Korea (Mon-Fri), Taiwan (Mon-Fri, Sun), Japan (Fri-Sat) and USA (Sat-Sun).

Another popular genre of programmes for TVB J2 is Japanese anime.

Other programmes broadcast include:

- Entertainment
- Life Trends
- Travel
- Music

In 2015, J2 became the broadcaster of Hong Kong Jockey Club horse racing and the Mark Six lottery drawings.

=== Originals ===
- Love Academy (愛情研究院)

A space for teenagers and stars to discuss different kinds of love matters and play love games. The hosts are Miki Yeung and Cyrus Chow.

- Summer in Beijing (首都闖蕩)

A reality show that comprised three single girls and a gentleman, centered around the 2008 Summer Olympics in Beijing. The hosts are Ursule Wong, Joyce Wong, Grace Wong and Jason Chan.
According to the Year 2009 Market Promotion, TVB will produce new reality shows based on the format of this one.

- Big Boys Club (兄弟幫)
- All Things Girl (姊妹淘)

== See also ==
- Television Broadcasts Limited
- TVB Jade
- TVB Pearl
- Digital Television in Hong Kong
