= Mark Six =

Lottery betting in Hong Kong

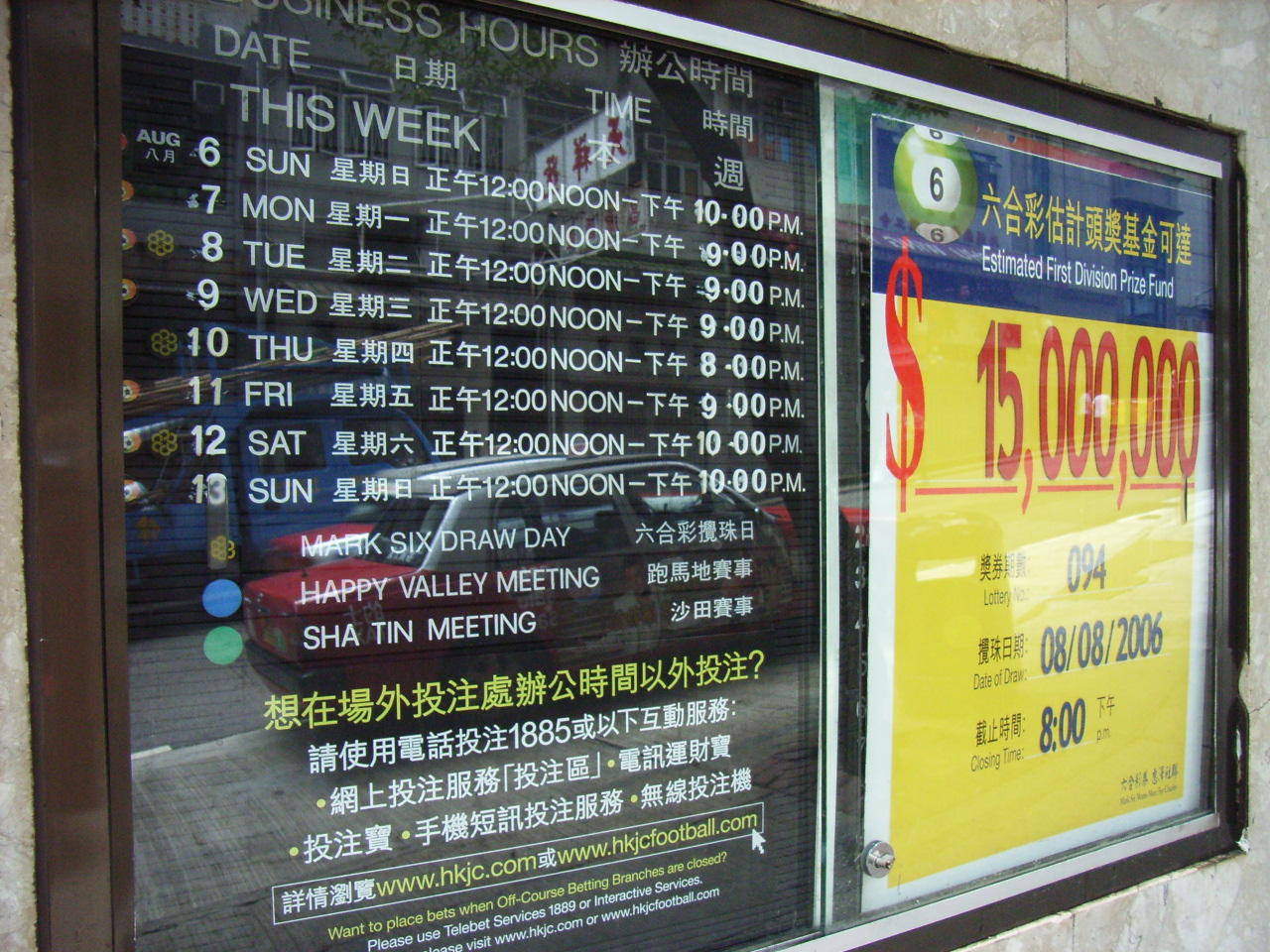
- Mark Six information board outside a betting branch of Hong Kong Jockey Club
- Region: Hong Kong
- First draw: 13 July 1976
- Operator: Hong Kong Jockey Club
- Highest jackpot: HK$193,762,620
- Odds of winning jackpot: 13,983,816 to 1
- Number of games: 6
- Shown on: Rediffusion TV, ATV Home (1976–1997, 2001–2015); TVB Jade (1997–2001); TVB J2 (2015–2022); TVB Finance, Sports & Information Channel (2022–2024); TVB Plus(2024-present)
- Website: bet.hkjc.com/marksix

Mark Six
- Traditional Chinese: 六合彩
Transcriptions
Yue: Cantonese
- Yale Romanization: Luhkhahpchói
- Jyutping: Luk6 hap6 coi2

Mark Six is a lottery game organised by the Hong Kong Jockey Club.

== History ==
The first iteration of Mark Six, known as 多重彩 in Chinese (Jyutping: do1 cung5 coi2; Cantonese Yale: dōchúhngchói), was launched on 5 September 1975, in an effort to battle the then-popular tse fa (Chinese: 字花) illegal lottery draws.

=== First iteration ===
The first iteration of Mark Six was a 6-out-of-14 drawing, with a guaranteed jackpot of HK$120,000. At the time, winning the Mark Six jackpot would allow a person to buy an apartment flat in Tsim Sha Tsui, which cost, on average, HK$80,000. To win the 1st prize, however, the player must select all the winning numbers, in the order the numbers were drawn. The 2nd prize requires the winner to select five of the six winning numbers, in the order the numbers are drawn. Those who selected all the winning numbers, but not in the order the numbers are drawn, are eligible for the 3rd prize.

The first drawing was held on 5 September 1975. There were no 1st prize winners and one 2nd prize winner in this drawing. The 2nd prize winner won HK$166,729.

=== Reform ===
The first iteration of Mark Six was noted to have been unpopular with Hong Kong residents. On 6 July 1976, the game was revamped to a 6-out-of-36 format and renamed to its current Chinese name.

The total amount of numbers in play increased from 36 to 40 in 1983, and saw further increases in 1987, 1990, and 1996. The current 6-out-of-49 format has been in place since 2002.

== The game ==
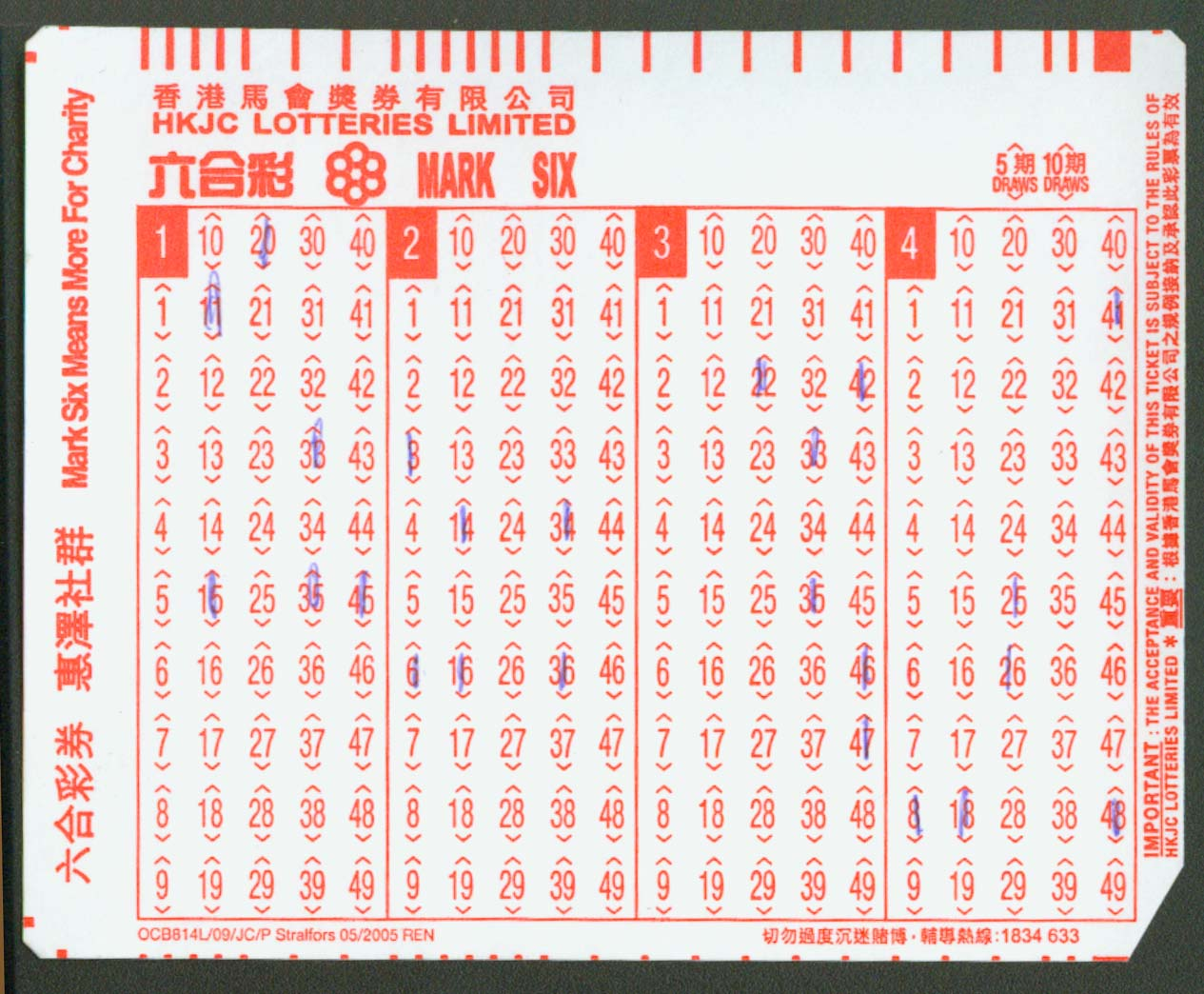
The front of a used Mark Six ticket

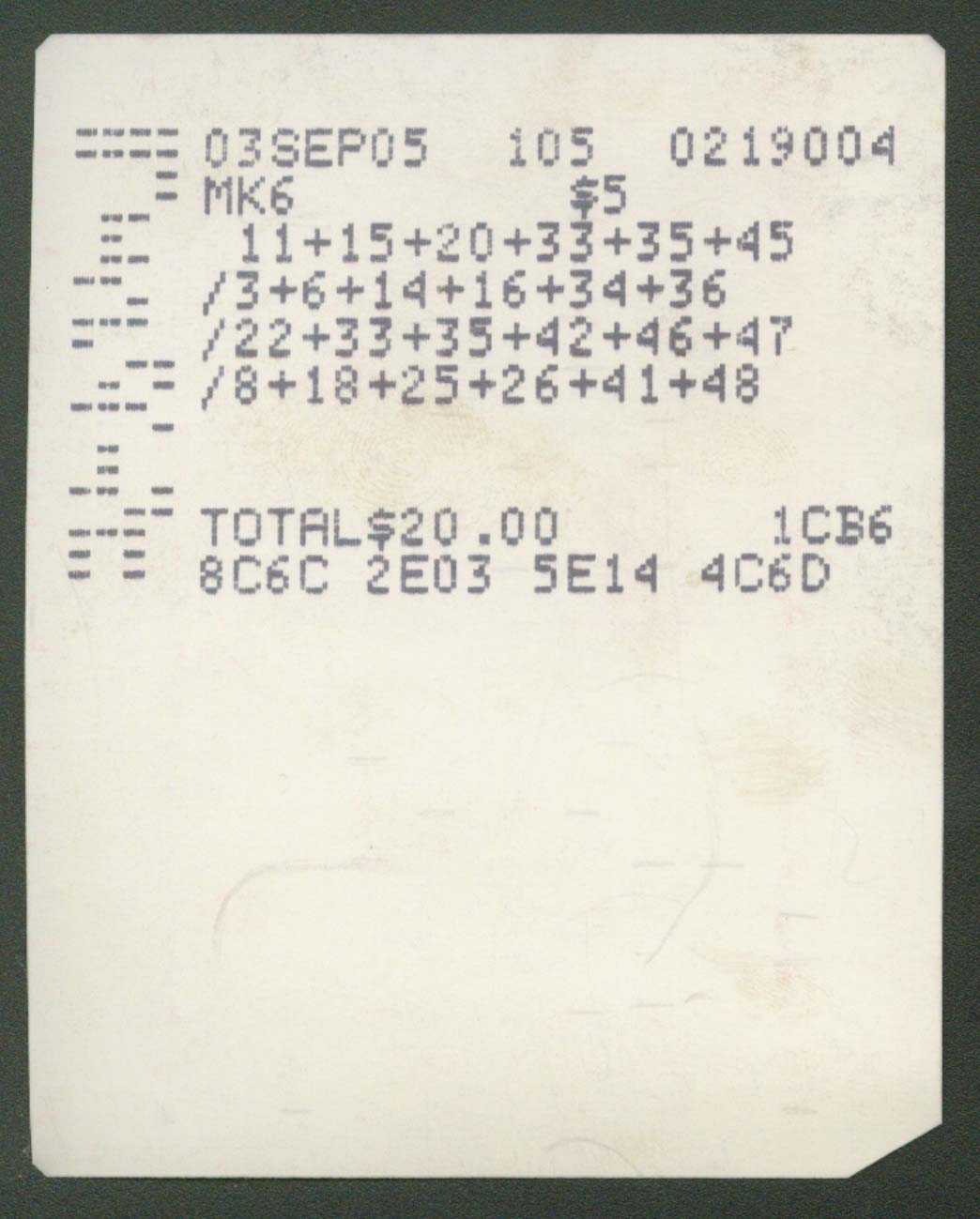
The back of a used Mark Six ticket

The game is a 6-out-of-49 lottery-style game, with seven prize levels. The winning numbers are selected automatically from a lottery machine that contains balls with numbers 1 to 49. Unlike other lottery drawings that feature a separate lottery machine for the final number, such as Mega Millions, the final number for each Mark Six drawing, known as the special number in Chinese (Chinese: 特別號碼) and the extra number in English, is drawn out of the same machine as the other six numbers drawn.

If nobody wins the 1st and 2nd prizes, the money that would have been paid out for the prizes will be added to a Jackpot (多寶獎) in the next draw. If there are winners of the first prize, these winners take the jackpot fund as well. If again there is no winner, the process continues until there is, and in such cases 1st division winnings can build up to about HKD$100 million (compared to the normal HKD$8 million 1st division prize), as seen several times in 2004, 2005, 2016.

For each draw, a certain percentage (see below for details) of the entry money is deducted and placed into a Snowball Pool. On selected draws, the Snowball Pool is added to the 1st division prize as well. These draws are known as Snowball Draws (金多寶). The HKJC decides which draws are snowball draws. Usually the date is chosen to match a public holiday or festival, and the draw is named accordingly.

These draws are very popular due to their large 1st division prizes.

Each unit of numbers costs HK$10, which, following a big price cut in 1976 and subsequent price increases over the years, is at the same level as when the first drawing was held in 1975.

== Prize ==
Prize allocations are governed by rules established by HKJC Lotteries, which operates the Mark Six lottery. Prizes for 1st to 3rd division wins are calculated based on a complex formula, with a guaranteed minimum prize fund for 1st division prizes. Prizes below 3rd division wins are fixed at a certain amount, and do not change.

Mark Six Prize (as of 2011)
Prize	Criteria	Prize
1st	All 6 drawn numbers	45% x (Prize Fund (Note: Prize Fund is the equivalent of 54% of the total amount of bets made in each draw) minus a snowball deduction (Note: A snowball deduction is a deduction based on a sum equivalent to 9% of the Prize Fund, minus the total amount payable to 4th, 5th, 6th & 7th Division Prizes.) and total amount payable to 4th, 5th, 6th & 7th Division Prizes, with a minimum prize fund of HK$8 million). The lot is then divided amongst the bets that won.
2nd	5 out of 6 drawn numbers, plus the extra number	15% x (Prize Fund minus a snowball deduction and total amount payable to 4th, 5th, 6th & 7th Division Prizes). The lot is then divided amongst the bets that won.
3rd	5 out of 6 drawn numbers	40% x (Prize Fund minus a snowball deduction and total amount payable to 4th, 5th, 6th & 7th Division Prizes). The lot is then divided amongst the bets that won.
4th	4 out of 6 drawn numbers, plus the extra number	HK$9,600
5th	4 out of 6 drawn numbers	HK$640
6th	3 out of 6 drawn numbers, plus the extra number	HK$320
7th	3 out of 6 drawn numbers	HK$40

== Drawings ==
Since 2004, Mark Six drawings are held three times a week, on Tuesday, Thursday, and either Saturday or Sunday. Weekend drawings began in September 2003, with drawings held on Saturdays with no horse races scheduled. That arrangement was later expanded to include both Saturdays and Sundays, to be held on a day with no horse races scheduled.

There is a precedent for HKJC officials to delay Mark Six drawings when there is a big accumulated jackpot (Chinese: 多寶), so as to allow people extra time to buy a ticket. Drawings have also been delayed due to computer errors at betting stations that prevent tickets from being sold.

Since the first Mark Six drawing, HKJC has used four different generation of lottery machines to draw the winning numbers. The first machine was flown in to Hong Kong from Germany, while the current machine, in use since May 2026, is made by US-based Smartplay International.

=== Fairness ===
To ensure the draw's fairness, a number of measures are taken. Employees with HKJC's security and customer service departments will strictly check and test all materials used for the draw, from boxing to transport. Balls used in the draw are also measured, weighed, and examined by X-Ray on a regular basis, and both the balls and the draw machine is locked in a safe location following each draw. The same set of balls is not used for two consecutive draws.

The machine used in the draw is examined prior to the drawing, and rehearsal runs are done prior to each drawing. During the drawing, a Justice of the Peace and a representative from a beneficiary organisation of the Lotteries Fund will be present to monitor the drawing. The two representatives will also select a box that contains the balls from multiple boxes prior to the drawing, and are tasked with confirming the number of balls present inside the lottery drawing machine, as well as the order the balls are placed in.

== Broadcast ==
Mark Six drawings have been televised on either of Hong Kong's terrestrial television networks throughout its history. Save for a period between 1997 and 2001, Asia Television was the sole terrestrial broadcaster of Mark Six lottery drawings until July 2015. TVB Jade broadcast the drawings from 1997 to 2001, and TVB J2 took over as the terrestrial broadcaster starting in August 2015.

The televised drawings are known to be amongst the most viewed programmes for ATV, a station that has suffered from low ratings for decades. Certain hosts of the televised drawings have gone on to become popular media personalities, including Ha Chun Chau (born Kenneth Ng Kam-tsuen, Sandra Ng's father) and Frankie Choi, who has hosted the televised drawings on both ATV and TVB, and is affectionately referred to by the local media as "Prince of Mark Six".

The televised drawings are known for featuring the song "Inkpot" by Dutch band Shocking Blue as its background music.

== Probability of win ==
The probability of winning the first prize is noted to be 1 in 13,983,816, and the odds of winning any of the prizes is noted to be 1 in 54, which is higher than other lotteries in other parts of the world.

== Allocation of bets ==
In addition to the 54% deduction of the bets made to form the Prize Fund, proceeds from the total amount of bets made are also allocated to various taxes and causes.

=== Lottery duty ===
25% of the total amount of bets made are paid out to the Government of Hong Kong in the form of a lottery duty. From the first drawings to 2016, HKJC has paid out over HK$37 billion in lottery duties to the government.

=== Lotteries Fund ===
15% of the total amount of bets made are deposited into a Lotteries Fund used for financing social welfare capital projects. The Lotteries Fund was established in June 1965, and the Mark Six has raised over HK$20 billion for the Lotteries Fund from 1976 to 2016. In the 2016–2017 fiscal year, Mark Six drawings contributed approximately HK$1.276 billion to the Lotteries Fund.

=== Commission ===
6% of the total amount of bets made are paid out to the HKJC as commission, which is used to cover various operating costs.

== Popularity ==
According to a 2012 report by the Hong Kong Polytechnic University and the Hong Kong Home Affairs Bureau, 56% of the 2,024 people surveyed said they had made bets on the Mark Six.
