= Phoenix North America Chinese Channel =

- Country: China
- Broadcast area: North America (USA and Canada); Latin America (Include Mexico, Argentina, Colombia, Venezuela, Ecuador, Peru, Chile, Paraguay, Uruguay, Panama); Brazil; Guyana; Suriname

Ownership
- Owner: Phoenix Television
- Sister channels: Phoenix Television; Phoenix InfoNews Channel

History
- Launched: January 1, 2001

Links
- Website: http://www.ifengus.com/

Availability

Streaming media
- Sling TV: Internet Protocol television

Phoenix North America Chinese Channel
- Traditional Chinese: 鳳凰衛視美洲台
- Simplified Chinese: 凤凰卫视美洲台
- Hanyu Pinyin: Fènghuáng Wèishì Měizhōu Tái
Transcriptions
Standard Mandarin
- Hanyu Pinyin: Fènghuáng Wèishì Měizhōu Tái

Phoenix North America Chinese Channel is one of the six channels that Phoenix Television operates. It was launched on 1 January 2001 in order to serve Chinese viewers in North America, and it is the first Chinese language channel that is available across the continent. This channel now broadcasts on both Dish Network and DirecTV satellite systems and shares a similar programming with Phoenix Chinese News and Entertainment Channel. Some of its in-house programmes include "Phoenix North America News" and "Experience America" .

== Related Channels ==
- Phoenix Television
- Phoenix InfoNews Channel
- Phoenix Chinese News and Entertainment Channel
