= Phoenix Movies Channel =

- Country: China
- Broadcast area: Mainland China; Asia (via Asiasat-7)
- Headquarters: Hong Kong

Programming
- Languages: English; Cantonese; Mandarin; Korean
- Picture format: HDTV 1080i

Ownership
- Owner: Phoenix Television
- Sister channels: Phoenix InfoNews Channel

History
- Launched: August 28, 1998
- Replaced: Star Chinese Movies

Links
- Website: ent.ifeng.com/movie

Phoenix Movies Channel
- Traditional Chinese: 鳳凰衛視電影台
- Simplified Chinese: 凤凰卫视电影台
- Hanyu Pinyin: Fènghuáng Wèishì Diànyǐng Tái
Transcriptions
Standard Mandarin
- Hanyu Pinyin: Fènghuáng Wèishì Diànyǐng Tái

Phoenix Movies Channel is one of the six channels that Phoenix Television operates. It was launched on August 28, 1998, and replaced Star Chinese Movies in Hong Kong and mainland China. It serves as an encrypted pay-television service. Currently, the encrypted signal is beamed via AsiaSat 3S across China, Vietnam (Via HTVC) and South Korea (Via SBS). At first, it was broadcast via cable in Hong Kong, and via satellite to Taiwan, and other regions worldwide. However, due to stiff competition from other Chinese movie channels, the channel was withdrawn from those regions.

To preserve the originality of the movies, all films are aired in their original language and are occasionally shown with Chinese subtitles (China) and Korean subtitles (South Korea).

Over 280 movie titles are shown each month, of which 80% are Asian productions from libraries including Golden Harvest, Golden Princess and Media Asia featuring renowned directors such as Wong Kar-wai and Tsui Hark, and star actors such as Jackie Chan, Chow Yun-fat, Tony Leung, Maggie Chow, Andy Lau, Stephen Chow, and Leon Lai. The remaining 20% of the programming comprises Hollywood and international blockbusters.

== Related Channels ==
- Phoenix Chinese Channel
- Phoenix InfoNews Channel
- Phoenix Chinese News and Entertainment Channel
- Phoenix Hong Kong Channel
