= Jadeworld (United States) =

- Country: China (main); United States
- Broadcast area: National
- Headquarters: Norwalk, CA

Ownership
- Owner: TVB Limited

History
- Launched: January 1984

Links
- Website: TVB USA

Jadeworld is a programming package operated by TVB (USA) Inc., a wholly owned subsidiary of the largest distributor of Chinese-language television programs – TVB Group, Hong Kong–based. TVB USA is headquartered in Los Angeles, with other operators in New York and San Francisco.

== Programs ==
TVB Channels cover an array of dramas, variety shows, U.S. and Hong Kong news, and sports.

=== News ===
TVB covers local, U.S. and Hong Kong news. U.S. and Hong Kong news is only offered on TVB's Jadeworld channels, however, TVB provides local news clips on their website.

=== Sports ===
Although TVB has a limited sports coverage that includes the Olympics, FIFA and other Hong Kong sports; with TVB on DISH, NBA TV, One World Sports and Universal Sports Network are also now offered as a part of DISH's Chinese Basic Package.

== Revamp of Jadeworld package ==
In April 2020, TVB HD, TVB Pearl, TVB2 (discontinued May 2020), and TVB Mandarin has no longer to providing with continued channel service. Although Jadeworld has provided new services on TVBJ1 referred to same as TVB Jade Los Angeles schedule so however, the TVB1 and TVBe have switched from standard version to high-definition version. TVB1 HD, TVBJ1 & TVBJ2, TVBSF, and TVBe HD have been already taking over because the TVB Network News is now provided for a new channel program of 24/7. Anyway, the TVB Drama Mandarin has been switched the language from Mandarin to Cantonese, and now the TVB Drama is now available in the Cantonese language version. TVBHD and TVB Mandarin is already discontinued service by April 2020 also the TVBS has no longer provided a TVB Hong Kong Drama in the TVBS schedule, it will be reorganization full TVBS content from Taiwan. In August 2022, TVB LA has been renamed into TVBJ2 so that's way the TVBJ1 (NY Area) and TVBJ2 (LA Area) without confusion but the TVBJ1/2 did provided accessible for free demand on carrier platforms of Spectrum Cable TV only. In May 2024, the TVB Pearl channel has been reinstated but the TVB Pearl is released schedule with dramas only since April 2020, the TVB Pearl channel was discontinued temporarily but the TVB Pearl channel has now returned and provided the Hong Kong dramas only.

Jadeworld is available on packages but is now only available AT&T U-verse, Spectrum, Dish, Verizon FIOS, Xfinity and Sling TV (internet streaming), which requires directly contacting TVB.

In addition, the channel lineup was altered in April 2020. Only TVB1, TVBE, and TVB Drama remain from the original lineup, with an overseas simulcast of the TVB News Channel being added to the roster. The four channels, and TVB J1, a free channel available on TVB Anywhere's North American free streaming service, were added to the USA's TVB Anywhere Plus as live TV channels.
