= Ifeng =

- Native name: Ifeng
- Type: US-listed Public Company
- Traded as: NYSE: FENG
- Industry: Advertising, news, publishing, digital media
- Founded: 1998; 28 years ago
- Key people: Wei Xu (Chairman of the Board of Directors), Qi Li(Chief Executive Officer of Phoenix New Media), Edward Lu（Chief Financial Officer of Phoenix New Media）， Xiaoyan Chi(Senior Vice President of Phoenix New Media), Chun Liu(Senior Vice President of Phoenix New Media), Ming Zou(Vice President and Senior Chief Editor of Phoenix New Media), Chenguang Wu(Vice President of Phoenix New Media; Editor-in-Chief), Aisi Xu(Vice President of Phoenix New Media), Fenghua Liu(Vice President of Phoenix New Media)
- Website: www.ifeng.com

Ifeng, also known as Phoenix New Media,is a leading global Chinese-language new media platform. It holds the ICP license No. Jing ICP Certificate 030609, with its official domain registered as ifeng.com. The main website operating entity is Beijing Tianying Jiuzhou Network Technology Co., Ltd., while Fenghuang Feiyang New Media (Beijing) Information Technology Co., Ltd. and Beijing Tian Ying Chuang Zhi Advertising Company Limited serve as its advertising business entities.

Founded in 1998 as the official online channel of Phoenix Television, ifeng evolved from a simple digital distribution outlet for television content into a full-spectrum new media enterprise. It completed its initial public offering on the New York Stock Exchange in 2011 under the stock ticker symbol FENG, marking it as one of the earliest Chinese new media platforms spun off from a traditional television group to be listed in the United States.

The platform reaches more than 400 million Chinese-speaking users globally across personal computers, wireless, and mobile platforms. Phoenix New Media operates ifeng.com and the Phoenix News app, one of the most popular news apps among Chinese-speaking users with nearly one million daily active users. Phoenix Satellite Television Holdings Limited (PSTV) holds a 55.04% stake in Phoenix New Media Limited, with the remaining shares held by public shareholders.

== History ==
=== Early Development (1996–2005) ===
Ifeng was established as Phoenix Television’s official website in 1998. On May 8, 1999, Ifeng provided real-time coverage alongside Phoenix TV of the protests by Beijing university students against the NATO bombing of the Chinese Embassy in Belgrade. The site published 72 updates in total, and traffic exceeded the cumulative total of the previous year, bringing the platform greater public attention. In April 2001, Ifeng’s coverage of the “Sino-US Mid-air Collision Incident” surpassed one million daily views. On September 11 of the same year, following the terrorist attacks on the World Trade Center in the United States, Ifeng became one of the earliest Chinese-language websites to report the event. Daily page views surged to 3 million, and the servers crashed several times. In 2002, Ifeng officially transformed from the website of Phoenix Television into an information website. On March 19, 2004, on the eve of the leadership election in Taiwan, Province of China, candidates Chen Shui-bian and Lu Hsiu-lien claimed to have been shot and injured while campaigning in Tainan. Ifeng’s coverage of the event generated nearly 10 million page views that day, ranking it as the 24th most visited website globally by daily traffic. In early 2005, the site’s daily page views had increased from fewer than 2 million in 1999 to 15 million.

=== Reorganization and Listing (2005–2013) ===
By the end of 2005, the number of Chinese Internet users had reached 111 million. Ifeng increased the number of daily top stories from three to 15, resulting in higher traffic, and completed a redesign and finalized its site logo. In 2006, Phoenix New Media began operating independently and adopted a “Vertical News Portal” development strategy, transitioning from an online distribution channel for traditional television content into an independent new media organization. In 2007, page views increased by 600% year-on-year and unique visitors by 300%. The domain name was changed from “phoenixtv” to “Ifeng”, and the brand was renamed “Phoenix New Media”. In April 2008, the site’s traffic ranked first among news portals worldwide. From 2009 to 2010, the site transitioned from a news portal to a comprehensive portal, adding commercial channels such as finance and entertainment. On May 12, 2011, Phoenix New Media was listed on the New York Stock Exchange under the ticker symbol NYSE: FENG, becoming one of the earliest Chinese new media companies to be spun off from a traditional media group for a U.S. listing. In 2013, traffic to the platform’s homepage ranked first among China’s comprehensive portals. In a survey of Internet users’ preferred portal for coverage of the “Two Sessions”, Ifeng accounted for 24.3%. According to Alexa data, its page views ranked first among global television and print-media websites.

=== Business Development (2015–2020) ===
In 2015, the “Phoenix Omni-Media Research Institute” was launched at the Shanghai Television Festival, and a “Warm News” section was jointly established with Xinhua News Agency’s New Media Center. In 2016, Ifeng launched the “Activists League” public welfare platform and registered a dedicated public welfare foundation in Beijing, operating projects such as “Forever Happiness”. In November of the same year, Ifeng and Yidian Zixun announced data and content sharing between their news and self-media matrices and jointly developed the “Phoenix Yidian Connect” platform. In 2017, Dual-drive development via Phoenix News App and Yidian Zixun. In 2018, the platform was recognized as the “Public Welfare Enterprise of the Year” at the China Charity Annual Conference and received a Gold Award at the IAI International Advertising Awards in the same year. In August 2020, Phoenix New Media sold its entire stake in Yidian Zixun for US$350 million.

=== Internationalization and Recent Development (2021–2026) ===
In September 2023, Ifeng became one of the first pilot platforms to participate in the establishment of fixed rumor-refutation sections on hot-search and trending lists. In 2024, during its coverage of the U.S. election, Ifeng independently translated and compiled key information, was among the earlier outlets to publish news of Donald Trump’s election victory, and completed its first live election-count page. The coverage increased overall traffic by 35% compared with previous comparable periods. During the Paris Olympics, Ifeng obtained on-site interview access for an international sporting event for the first time; its coverage generated more than 7.8 billion instances of dissemination across platforms, with more than 150 related topics appearing on hot-search lists. In the same year, Ifeng was recognized as the “Annual Public Welfare Communication Platform” at the Public Advertising Huanghe Awards. In 2025, coverage related to the China-US trade war generated 520 million reads. Ifeng hosted the “China Enterprises Going Global Summit” and added four overseas sites serving North America, the Middle East, Saudi Arabia, and Macao, in addition to its 28 existing regional sites. In 2026, in its coverage of the U.S.-Israel-Iran war, Ifeng continued to provide translated, original, and interpretive content, while adding timeline and live-streaming features to its products. As of September 2026, the annual “Activists League” public welfare gala had been held for ten consecutive years, with public welfare partners covering all 31 provinces, autonomous regions, and municipalities in mainland China.

== Business and Product Matrix ==
Ifeng's flagship application is the Phoenix News APP. Its content offerings span coverage of major events, original journalism, livestreaming, and community operations. Also, Youth BANG, Phoenix Premium Products, Phoenix Lab, and Fengfei. Across major platforms, Ifeng's account matrix has accumulated over 300 million followers.

== Social Welfare and Industry Influence ==
In cooperation with three foundations, it has hosted the Eternal Happiness charity galas and raised more than RMB 9.03 million in donations. The platform has set up a dedicated charity fund and launched the Activists League welfare platform, managing multiple initiatives including Forever Happiness, the Child Protection Plan, the Children Benefit Plan, The Tape Pledge, and Brave Kids. Participants span all 31 provincial-level administrative regions of China. The annual charity gala has been held for ten consecutive years. Ifeng received the Annual Public Welfare Communication Platform award at the Public Advertising Huanghe Awards, presented by the China Advertising Association.
