= Grasp a Dream =

- Country of origin: Hong Kong
- Original language: Mandarin Chinese
- No. of episodes: 920

Production
- Running time: 4 minutes

Original release
- Network: Phoenix Television
- Release: 2011 – August 26, 2016

Grasp a Dream (Chinese: 与梦想同行; pinyin: yǔ mèng xiǎng tóng xíng) was a short television program series broadcast by Phoenix Television in Hong Kong. It was broadcast from Monday to Friday, with each episode lasting 4 minutes. It followed the stories of people with dreams with the aim to encourage more people to follow their dreams.
