= Phoenix Hong Kong Channel =

- Country: China
- Broadcast area: Hong Kong, Macau, Guangzhou, Canada, United States, Vietnam, Malaysia, Asia Pacific

Programming
- Languages: Cantonese; Mandarin; English

Ownership
- Owner: Phoenix Television

History
- Launched: 28 March 2011

Availability

Terrestrial
- Digital TV (Hong Kong): Channel 85 (HD)

Streaming media
- ifeng: http://v.ifeng.com/live
- Sling TV: Internet Protocol television

Phoenix Hong Kong Channel
- Traditional Chinese: 鳳凰衛視香港台
- Simplified Chinese: 凤凰卫视香港台
Transcriptions
Standard Mandarin
- Hanyu Pinyin: Fènghuáng Wèishì Xiānggǎng Tái

Phoenix Hong Kong Channel is one of the six channels that Phoenix Television operates. It was launched on 28 March 2011 in order to serve Chinese viewers in Hong Kong, and it is Phoenix Television's first Cantonese language channel that is available across Hong Kong. This channel now broadcasts through cable television and satellite television systems. Some programmes are broadcast in Mandarin Chinese. 97% of the company is owned by a single holder in Beijing named Vivian Huo, managing director at H&H Capital Partners.

On 22 April 2024, the channel began broadcasting over-the-air in Hong Kong on channel 85 as part of a lease from TVB, replacing TVB Finance, Sports & Information Channel.

== Programmes ==
=== Homemade ===
- Info Stream
- Phoenix News Express
- The World Connection
- Phoenix Nightline
- Medi App
- Hong Kong Hot Kitchen
- News Decoder

== Related channels ==
- Phoenix Chinese Channel
- Phoenix InfoNews Channel
- Phoenix Chinese News and Entertainment Channel
- Phoenix Movies Channel
