= PSTV =

PSTV may refer to:

- Potato spindle tuber viroid, an infectious pathogen
- PlayStation TV, a microconsole by Sony
