= Phoenix InfoNews Channel =

Hong Kong pay TV news Channel

- Country: China
- Broadcast area: Hong Kong; Americas; Worldwide
- Headquarters: Tai Po, Hong Kong

Programming
- Picture format: 1080i HDTV

Ownership
- Owner: Phoenix Television
- Sister channels: Phoenix North America Chinese Channel; Phoenix Television

History
- Launched: 1 January 2001
- Closed: 1 July 2020 (Astro, Malaysia, but relaunched on 9 July 2020)

Links
- Website: phtv.ifeng.com

Availability

Streaming media
- Sling TV: Internet Protocol television

Phoenix InfoNews Channel
- Traditional Chinese: 鳳凰衛視資訊台
- Simplified Chinese: 凤凰卫视资讯台
- Hanyu Pinyin: Fènghuáng Wèishì Zīxùn Tái
Transcriptions
Standard Mandarin
- Hanyu Pinyin: Fènghuáng Wèishì Zīxùn Tái

Phoenix InfoNews Channel is a Hong Kong pay television news channel owned by Phoenix Television. It is the first channel to report news across the Greater China region, which includes mainland China, Macau, Taiwan and Hong Kong. The channel first started broadcasting on 1 January 2001, delivering news and financial updates around the clock. Analysts also provide comments and analysis on current issues and topics.

The channel's coverage of the September 11 attacks prompted China Central Television to launch its own rolling news channel on 1 May 2003. At the time when the story broke, InfoNews was on the scene and provided reporting as the situation unfolded, whereas CCTV did not report it for as many as two successive days.

On 14 March 2019, Phoenix InfoNews Channel switched to 16:9 format on Astro.

The Phoenix InfoNews Channel and Phoenix Chinese Channel ceased broadcasting on 1 July 2020 at 12:02am on Astro due to the latter deciding not to renew the former's contact: however, both channels later resumed broadcasts on 9 July.

== Related channels ==
- Phoenix Chinese Channel
- Phoenix Chinese News and Entertainment Channel
- Phoenix Movies Channel
- Phoenix Hong Kong Channel
