= Phoenix Chinese News and Entertainment Channel =

- Logo of Phoenix Channel in Europe
- Country: China
- Broadcast area: Europe; Africa; Japan; Australia

Ownership
- Owner: Phoenix Television
- Sister channels: Phoenix InfoNews Channel

History
- Launched: 1993

Links
- Website: www.pcne.tv

Phoenix Chinese News and Entertainment Channel
- Traditional Chinese: 鳳凰衛視歐洲台
- Simplified Chinese: 凤凰卫视欧洲台
- Hanyu Pinyin: Fènghuáng Wèishì Ōuzhōu Tái
Transcriptions
Standard Mandarin
- Hanyu Pinyin: Fènghuáng Wèishì Ōuzhōu Tái

Phoenix Chinese News and Entertainment or Phoenix CNE Channel is one of the six channels that Phoenix Television operates. It was launched in 1993 as CNE in order to serve Chinese viewers in Europe, and was acquired by Phoenix in August 1999. This channel is a 24-hour free-to-air channel based in London and broadcast via the Astra 2G satellite across the continent. The channel broadcasts its Chinese programmes to 91 countries and regions in Europe and Africa, and reach more than 56 million households and 80% of European Chinese penetration.

Phoenix CNE dedicates to promote cultural exchanges, and closer economic partnerships between China, Europe and Africa creates waves for Chinese enterprises and provinces in their efforts to open up new trade and investment opportunities in these continents.

== History ==
The channel's origins lie down to 1993, with the creation in the United Kingdom of Chinese News and Entertainment (欧洲东方文电视, better known under the initials CNE) by Hong Kong businessman Tsui Tsin-tong (rendered Xu Zhantang in Mandarin). Its content providers were Asia Television of Hong Kong and China Central Television of mainland China. A small amount of programming and advertising was done locally. Initially, it broadcast two hours a day on the Astra satellite, expanding to five hours in 1994. A distribution agreement with Telewest was signed in November 1995.

In August 1999, Phoenix Television acquired CNE and renamed it Phoenix CNE, becoming its European subsidiary. At the same time, it started digital broadcasts using the Sky Digital platform in the UK and Ireland, and started broadcasting a 24-hour schedule. The rebranding took place in the latter half of the month; Phoenix gained a 70% stake. On 1 December 1999, broadcasts on the Eutelsat-II-F4 satellite began. By 2015, its European programming mostly consisted of general European news and news concerning the diaspora in Europe.

== Related Channels ==
- Phoenix Chinese Channel
- Phoenix InfoNews Channel
- Phoenix Movies Channel
- Phoenix Hong Kong Channel
