= TVB News Channel =

24-hour television news channel in Hong Kong

TVB News Channel 無綫新聞台
- Country: China
- Broadcast area: Asia; North America
- Network: TVB
- Headquarters: TVB City, 77 Chun Choi Street, Tseung Kwan O Industrial Estate, Tseung Kwan O, Kowloon, Hong Kong, China

Programming
- Language: Cantonese
- Picture format: 1080i HDTV

Ownership
- Owner: TVB Limited
- Sister channels: TVB Jade; TVB Pearl; TVB Plus

History
- Launched: 18 February 2004; 22 years ago (Pay TV); 11 October 2008; 17 years ago (Free TV)
- Closed: 1 July 2021; 5 years ago (Astro feed, Malaysia)
- Former names: TVB iNews (2004-2017)

Links
- Website: news.tvb.com

Availability

Terrestrial
- Digital TV (Hong Kong): Channel 83 (HD)
- Cignal (Philippines): Channel 284 (HD)

Streaming media
- Affiliated Streaming Service(s): myTV SUPER (Hong Kong)
- Astro (Malaysia): TVB Anywhere+ (HD)
- Unifi TV (Malaysia): TVB Anywhere+ (HD)

TVB News Channel (previously TVB iNews, Chinese: 無綫新聞台) is a 24-hour non-stop Cantonese news and information channel based in Hong Kong and Asia, utilizing the resources of TVB News, and operated by TVB. The channel provides news and information updates every 30 minutes.
