= TVB Jade =

Television channel in Hong Kong

TVB Jade 無綫電視翡翠台
- Broadcast area: Worldwide
- Headquarters: 77 Chun Choi Street, Tseung Kwan O Industrial Estate, New Territories, Hong Kong

Programming
- Languages: Cantonese (main); Mandarin, English
- Picture format: 1080i HDTV

Ownership
- Owner: TVB Limited
- Sister channels: TVB Pearl; TVB Plus; TVB News Channel

History
- Launched: 19 November 1967; 58 years ago (as TVB Jade)

Links
- Website: programme.tvb.com/jade/

Availability

Terrestrial
- Digital TV (Hong Kong): Channel 81 (HD)

Streaming media
- Affiliated Streaming Service(s): myTV SUPER

TVB Jade
- Traditional Chinese: 無綫電視翡翠台
- Simplified Chinese: 无线电视翡翠台
Transcriptions
Standard Mandarin
- Hanyu Pinyin: Wúxiàn Diànshì Fěicuì Tái
Yue: Cantonese
- Yale Romanization: mòuhsin dihnsih féichuei tòih
- Jyutping: mou4 sin3 din6 si6 fei2 coei3 toi4

TVB Jade (Chinese: 無綫電視翡翠台), or simply Jade, is a Hong Kong Cantonese-language free-to-air television channel owned and operated by TVB Limited as its flagship service, alongside its sister network, the English-language TVB Pearl. Broadcasting started on 19 November 1967. It is headquartered at TVB City at the Tseung Kwan O Industrial Estate in Tseung Kwan O, in the Sai Kung District. Primarily broadcasting entertainment programming, TVB Jade has historically been the most dominant television channel in the region in terms of viewership, with its closest competitor having been the now-defunct ATV Home.

Jade primarily broadcasts in the Cantonese language; it has also offered programs with alternative audio tracks in Mandarin, English, and other foreign languages. Some shows also offer subtitles in multiple languages.

== Audience ==
During the 21:30 to 22:30 weekday time-slot, TVB Jade consistently attains the highest television audience ratings in Hong Kong. Which in the 90s, with an average of a '32' ratings point in that time-slot, it is watched by more than 80% of the TV audience in Hong Kong.

== Digital broadcasting ==
TVB Jade was launched on DTMB digital terrestrial television on 31 December 2007, using digital virtual channel 81.

== Overseas broadcasting ==
=== Mainland China ===
Due to the needs of reform and opening up, TVB Jade was broadcast by some cable providers in Guangdong in the 1990s, and officially obtained the right to broadcast legally in Guangdong Province in September 2004. After ATV Home stopped broadcasting, TVB Jade became the only overseas Cantonese TV channel that could legally broadcast in Guangdong Province.

Some programmes broadcast on TVB Jade are censored by Guangdong authorities (like some pre-2020 RTHK-produced political and current affairs programmes, "sensitive" news clips, or TVB dramas that were banned by the mainland authorities) and they insert some entertainment programmes, localized advertisements or the Hong Kong Government's promotional clips instead.

During the "National Day of Mourning", access to TVB channels (Jade and Pearl) was blocked and some cable providers in Guangdong switched their Jade and Pearl feeds to CCTV-1, but Guangdong Cable only blocked Jade's and Pearl's entertainment programmes and advertisements.

=== Southeast Asia ===
TVB Jade Southeast Asia
- Country: China
- Broadcast area: Malaysia; Singapore; Philippines
- Headquarters: 77 Chun Choi Street, Tseung Kwan O Industrial Estate, Tseung Kwan O, New Territories, Hong Kong SAR, China

Programming
- Languages: Cantonese; Mandarin (selected only)
- Picture format: 1080i HDTV

Ownership
- Owner: Television Broadcasts Limited
- Sister channels: TVB Xing He; Asian Action Channel; TVB Magic

History
- Launched: 1 May 2016 (Malaysia); 1 September 2018 (Singapore); 6 February 2026 (Philippines)
- Replaced: Astro Wah Lai Toi (Malaysia); MTV Live HD (Cignal TV channel space; Philippines)
- Former names: TVBJ Singapore

Links
- Website: zhongwen.astro.com.my/Channels/jade.aspx

Availability

Terrestrial
- StarHub TV (Singapore): Channel 838 (HD)
- Singtel TV (Singapore): Channel 511 (HD)
- Cignal (Philippines): Channel 280 (HD)

TVB Jade Southeast Asia is a pay television channel owned by Television Broadcasts Limited. It was first launched on Astro on 1 May 2016. As a main general news and entertainment television channel, it broadcasts in both Cantonese and Mandarin. It simulcasts Hong Kong TVB Jade primetime slot, including live events. TVB Jade SEA also featured variety shows and newscasts (in simulcast from Hong Kong).

== See also ==
- Television Broadcasts Limited
- TVB Pearl
- TVB J2
- TVB Jade International
