= Tseung Kwan O Industrial Estate =

Industrial estate in Hong Kong

Coordinates: 22°16′57.9″N 114°16′21.1″E

- Traditional Chinese: 將軍澳工業邨
- Simplified Chinese: 将军澳工业邨
Transcriptions
Standard Mandarin
- Hanyu Pinyin: Jiāngjūn'ào Gōngyècūn
Yue: Cantonese
- Jyutping: zoeng1 gwan1 ou3 gung1 jip6 cyun1

Alternative Chinese name
- Traditional Chinese: 將軍澳工業園
- Simplified Chinese: 将军澳工业园
Transcriptions
Standard Mandarin
- Hanyu Pinyin: Jiāngjūn'ào Gōngyèyuán
Yue: Cantonese
- Jyutping: zoeng1 gwan1 ou3 gung1 jip6 jyun4

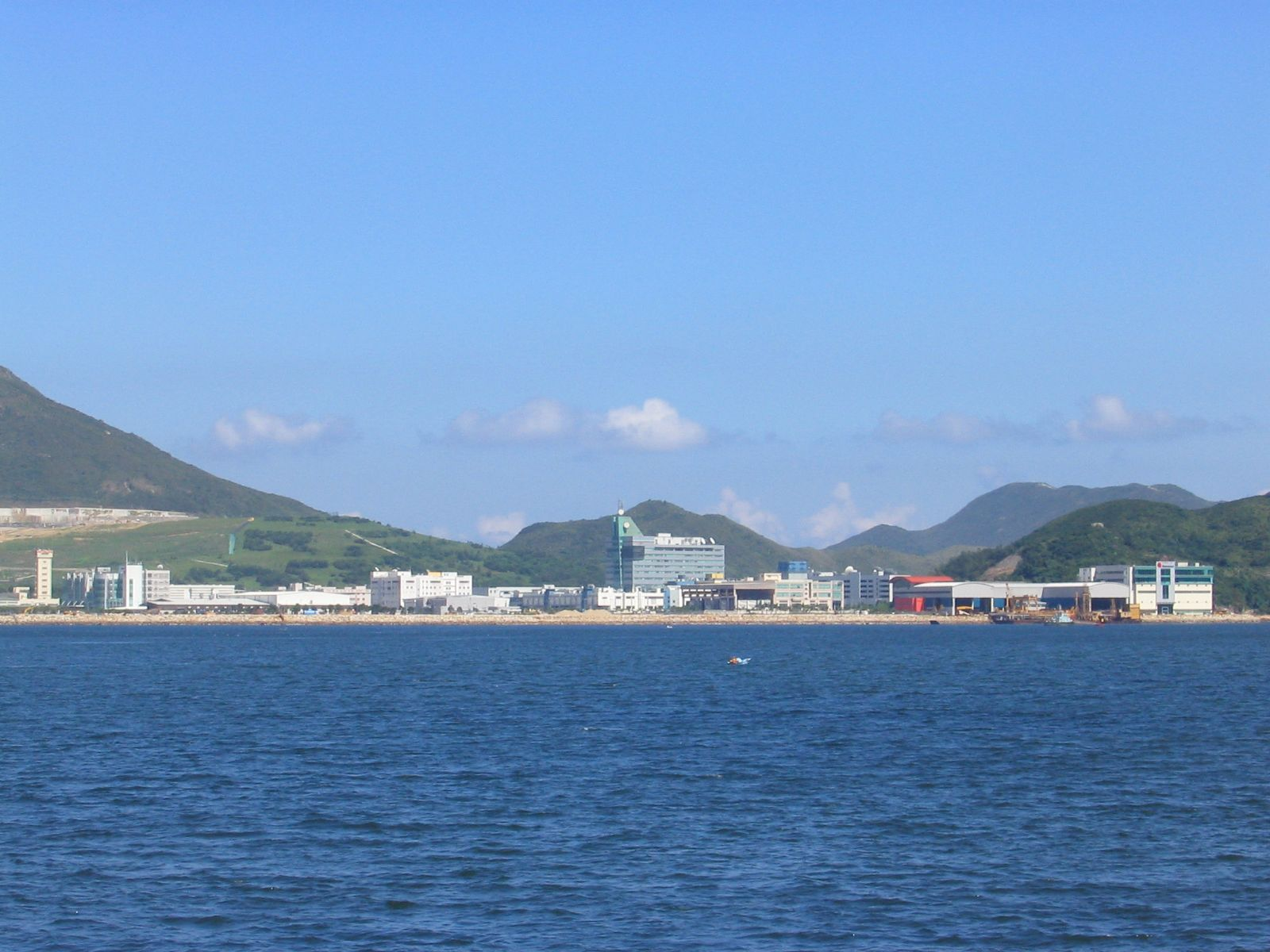
View of Tseung Kwan O Industrial Estate across Junk Bay (Tseung Kwan O).

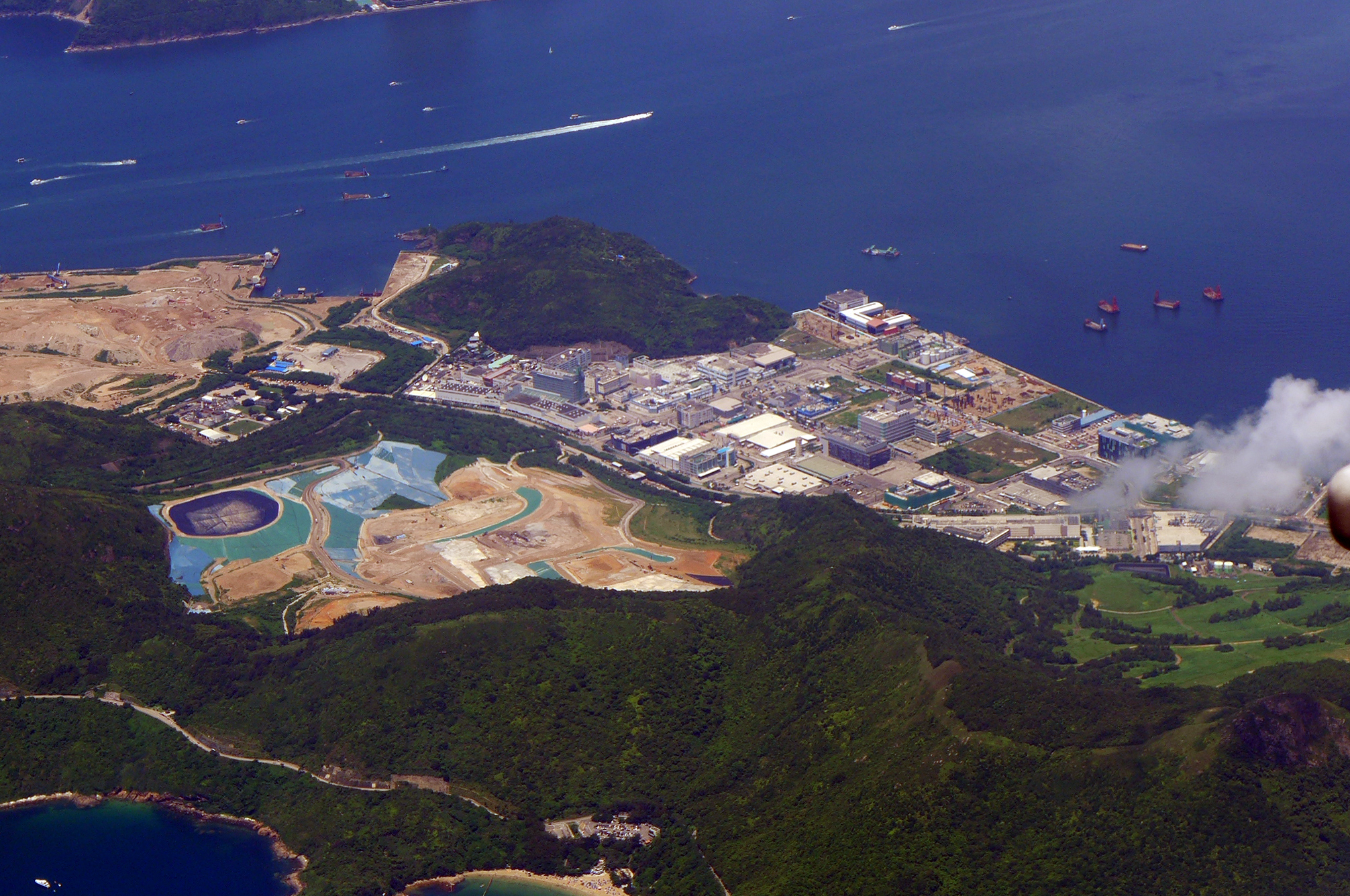
Aerial view of Tseung Kwan O Industrial Estate

Tseung Kwan O Industrial Estate (Chinese: 將軍澳工業邨, branded as 將軍澳工業園) is located in the southeast of the Tseung Kwan O New Town, Sai Kung District in Hong Kong.

== Location ==
Tseung Kwan O Industrial Estate has an area of 75 ha (other sources mention 86 ha and 95 ha). It is located 3 km south east of Tseung Kwan O New Town. The Estate has a marine frontage and was partly built on reclaimed land. Reclamation and servicing work were completed in 1997.

The former island of Fat Tong Chau is located at the southwest of the Estate. The South East New Territories Landfill (SENT) is located at the south of the Estate and Fat Tong Chau.

== Tenants ==
The headquarters of Television Broadcasts Limited (TVB), known as TVB City, is located in the Industrial Estate at 77 Chun Choi Street, and broadcasts the Cantonese-language TV station TVB Jade and the English-language TVB Pearl.
