= TVB =

Hong Kong television network company

TVB Limited

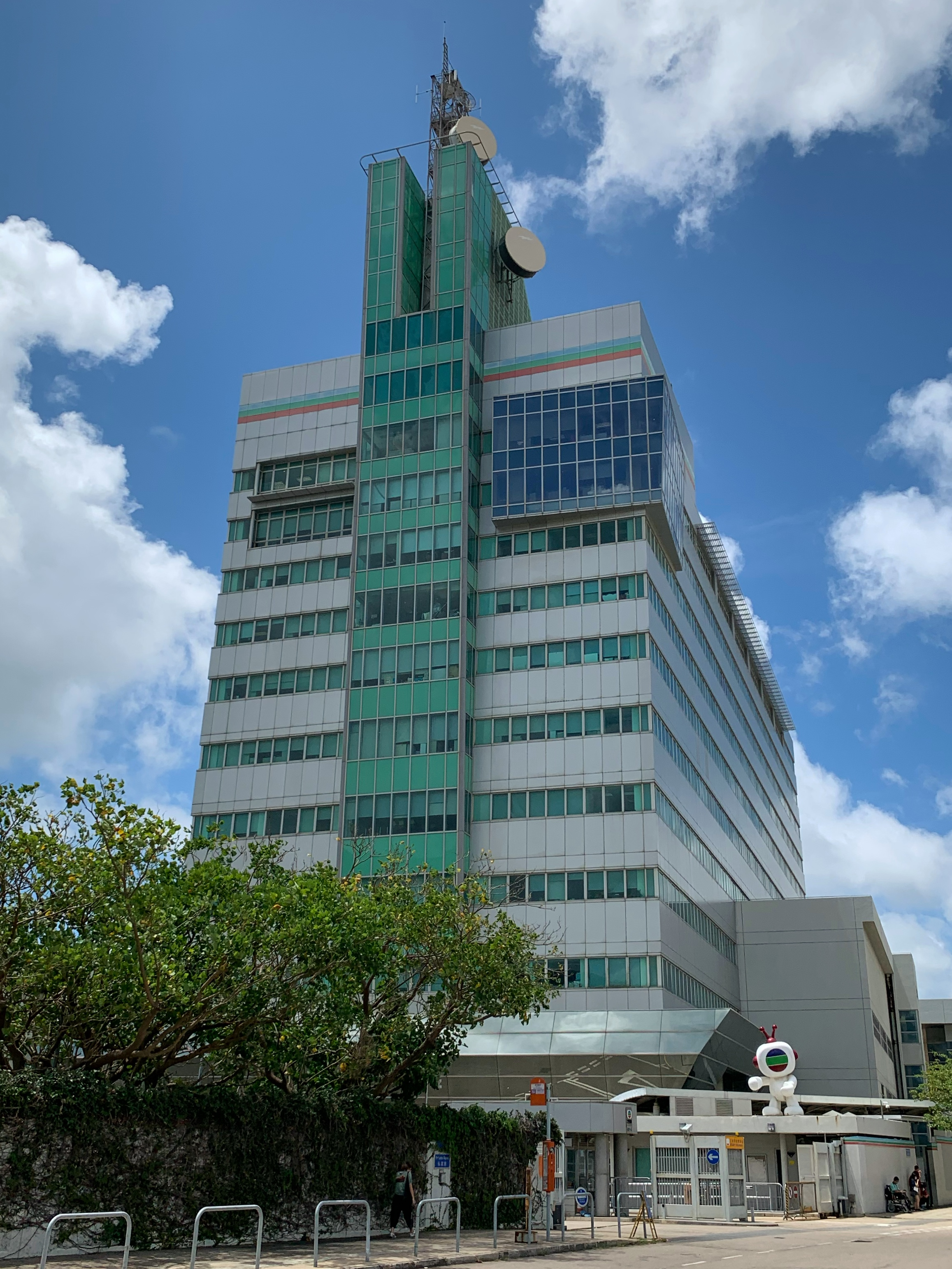
- Headquarters at TVB, formerly known as TVB City
- Native name: 無綫集團有限公司
- Formerly: Television Broadcasts Limited (1968-2026)
- Type: Public
- Traded as: SEHK: 511
- Industry: Television broadcasting; media and entertainment
- Founded: 19 November 1967; 58 years ago in Broadcast Drive, Kowloon Tong, British Hong Kong
- Headquarters: 77 Chun Choi Street, Tseung Kwan O Industrial Estate, New Territories, Hong Kong
- Area served: Worldwide, primarily for Cantonese language markets.
- Key people: Thomas Hui (Chairman & Non-Executive Director); Li Ruigang (Non-Executive Director); Eric Tsang (General Manager)
- Revenue: HK$2.5 billion (2022)
- Net income: -HK$0.8 billion (2022)
- Number of employees: 3,200 (2023)
- Parent: Young Lion Holdings Limited (China Media Capital)
- Website: www.tvb.com

TVB

TVB Limited
- Traditional Chinese: 無綫集團有限公司
- Simplified Chinese: 无线集团有限公司
- Literal meaning: Wireless Group Limited
Transcriptions
Standard Mandarin
- Hanyu Pinyin: Wúxiàn jítuán yǒuxiàn gōngsī
Yue: Cantonese
- Yale Romanization: mòuh sin jaahp tyùhn yáuh haahn gūng sī
- Jyutping: mou4 sin3 zaap6 tyun4 jau5 haan6 gung1 si1

TVB
- Traditional Chinese: 無綫電視
- Simplified Chinese: 无线电视
- Literal meaning: wireless television
Transcriptions
Standard Mandarin
- Hanyu Pinyin: Wúxiàn Diànshì
Yue: Cantonese
- Yale Romanization: mòuh sin dinh sih
- Jyutping: mou4 sin3 din6 si6

Former name: Television Broadcasts Limited
- Traditional Chinese: 電視廣播有限公司
- Simplified Chinese: 电视广播有限公司
- Literal meaning: Television Broadcasts Limited
Transcriptions
Standard Mandarin
- Hanyu Pinyin: Diànshì Guǎngbō Yǒuxiàngōngsī
Hakka
- Romanization: dhien sih ghuång-bóh youh kaan khoüng sí
- Pha̍k-fa-sṳ: Dhién-syi ghuång-bó yauh-shiäan khoüng sih
Yue: Cantonese
- Yale Romanization: dinh sih gwóng bo yauh haahn gūng sī
- Jyutping: din6 si6 gwong2 bo3 jau5 haan6 gung1 si1
Southern Min
- Teochew Peng'im: Tihan si gong but you kian khong sik

TVB Limited (formerly Television Broadcasts Limited) is a Hong Kong television network that began broadcasting on 19 November 1967. It operates four free-to-air terrestrial television channels, with TVB Jade as its main Cantonese service, and TVB Pearl as its main English service. Since 2003, TVB has been headquartered at TVB City in the Tseung Kwan O Industrial Estate. Historically a cultural powerhouse in the Chinese-speaking world, TVB is known for its television dramas, the Miss Hong Kong and Miss Chinese International pageants, and for launching the careers of many Hong Kong actors and artists.

== History ==
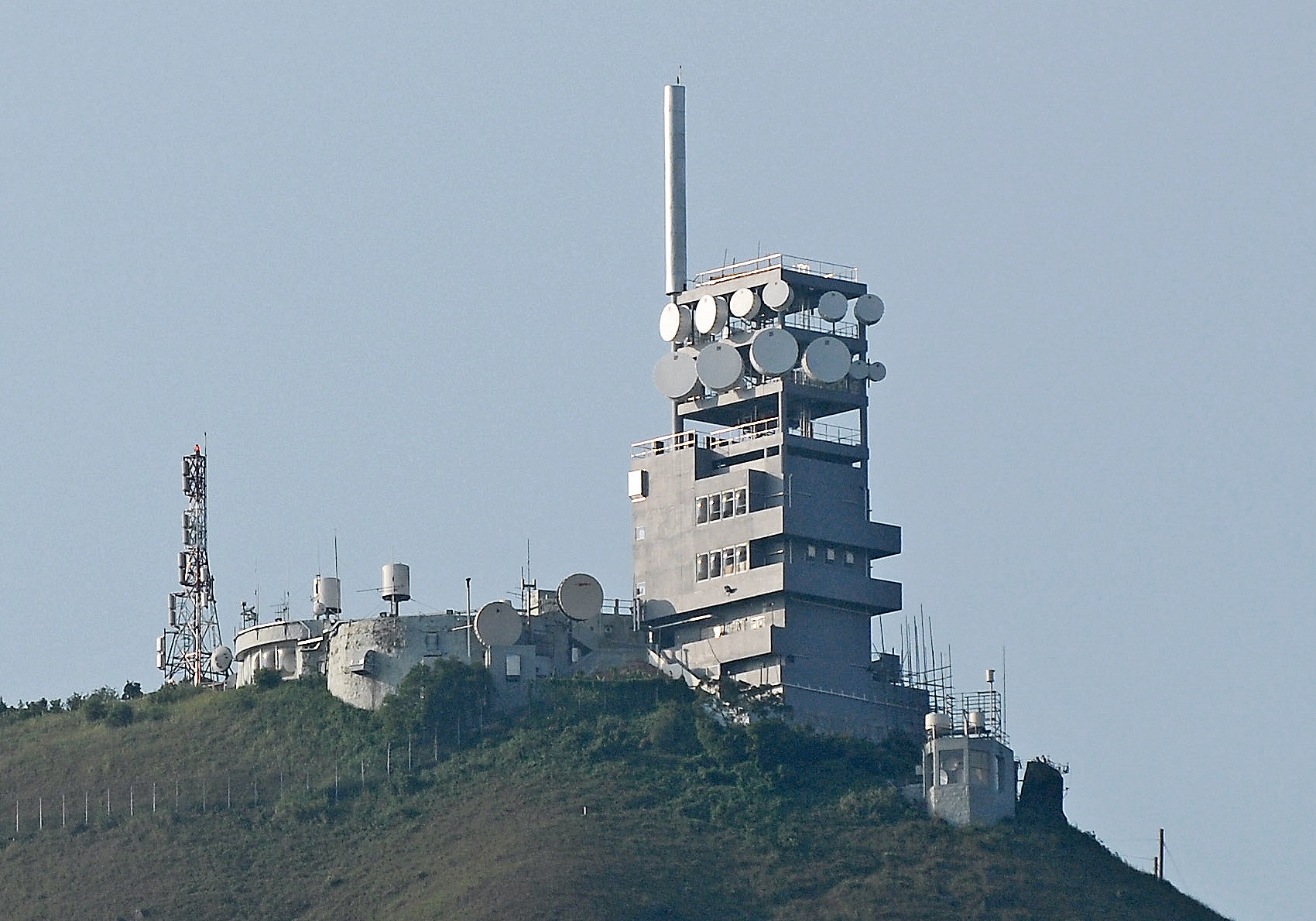
The main TVB transmitter at Temple Hill. TVB was Hong Kong's first "wireless", or free-to-air television station.

=== Origins ===
The British Hong Kong government set up a working party in the early 1960s to study the idea of setting up a second television station in Hong Kong, where the only television at that time was the wired, subscription-supported Rediffusion Television. There was debate as to whether the second station should be set up as a Crown corporation, like the BBC; a purely commercial enterprise; or a combination of the two. Another challenge lay in procuring enough content for the new station. In 1962, Director of Information Services J. L. Murray stated that while English programming could be purchased from other countries, "no country is producing a mass of suitable pre-recorded material in Chinese". Even though Hong Kong was already regarded as a centre for film production, it was considered a challenge to source enough Chinese-language content for another television station, as most of it would need to be produced in Hong Kong.

Regardless, there was commercial interest in the concept. A government franchise for a new wireless (free-to-air) television station was opened for tenders on 6 February 1965 and closed on 6 August 1965. TVB, incorporated on 26 July 1965, was co-founded by Sir Run Run Shaw, chairman from 1980 to 2012, Sir Douglas Clague and Harold Lee Hsiao-wo of the Lee Hysan family. On 25 January 1966 it was announced that Television Broadcasts Limited had won the franchise, winning against six other bids.

At its launch, the TV station was promoted in Chinese as “wireless television” (無綫電視) to distinguish it from the cable broadcaster RTV, which later became ATV and switched to free-to-air broadcasting. “Mou Sin” (“Chinese: 無綫; Jyutping: mou⁵ sin³; lit. 'Wireless'”) remains the most common name for the station in Hong Kong, while outside the city it is generally known as TVB.

=== Opening ===
The new Television Broadcasts Limited station at 77 Broadcast Drive in Kowloon Tong, Kowloon was officially opened by Governor David Trench on 19 November 1967. The governor spoke of the potential for television to better society, stating that the new station would play a significant role in "helping and enlighting our people", calling television "one of the most potent means of disseminating information there is".

The first images shown on the station were a live transmission of the Macau Grand Prix, which began broadcasting at 9:00 am that day and was interrupted by footage of the opening of the new station. The first colour broadcast was then made, a feature called "London Calling Hongkong" which constituted greetings from former governors Alexander Grantham and Robert Black. Following this was a piano recital by Chiu Yee-ha, who had also performed at the opening of the Hong Kong City Hall.

The new station broadcast both Cantonese-language and English-language channels. The Cantonese channel, called TVB Jade, began regular service on 4:30 pm that day on Channel 21, while the English service (TVB Pearl) began at 6:00 pm on Channel 25. The inaugural programming lineup included Enjoy Yourself Tonight, a Chinese language variety show, and Meet The Press, an English current affairs programme.

=== Infrastructure development ===
Hong Kong's mountainous topography posed a challenge to TVB, which was Hong Kong's first television station broadcast wirelessly, using a terrestrial television transmitter instead of a complex coaxial cable network. A network of transmitters, built atop various mountains, helped provide coverage to the territory. The main transmitter was built at Temple Hill, above Kowloon, to reach most of the main populated centre of Hong Kong as well as parts of the New Territories. Two broadcast relay stations were came into operation on 15 May 1968: one at Lamma Island expanded coverage to Pok Fu Lam, Aberdeen, Repulse Bay, and parts of Stanley, while another at Castle Peak covered Tuen Mun, Yuen Long, and Ping Shan.

A third booster station, located on Cloudy Hill, was activated in June 1968 and brought TVB reception to Fanling, Taipo, and Sheung Shui.

== Development ==
- TVB receives praise for its programming from a wide range of demographics, including the middle class, as was the case with its 2004 historical drama series War and Beauty. Its programme line-up features a steady stream of soap operas, variety shows and other populist fare.
- TVB has been criticised for signing exclusive contracts with many local celebrities which restrict them from appearing on other local television stations. Hong Kong Cable Television claims it is unfair competition (although Asia Television, another major television station in Hong Kong, disagrees). In fact, many artists do not have exclusive contracts with TVB and are free to show up in programmes produced by other local television stations or out-sourcing production houses.
- The annual TVB Music Awards ceremony is one of the biggest for Cantopop personalities. It is widely rumoured that TVB distributes the awards to those who are obedient to the company's demands, and the Independent Commission Against Corruption has investigated the arrangement of the awards. It ruled that three TVB staff members under scrutiny were not guilty. Afterwards, TVB reformed its music programmes in a bid to reestablish their authority.
- On the other hand, TVB was awarded the National Association of Broadcasters's (NAB) International Broadcasting Excellence Award in 2001. The award recognised the company's outstanding contributions to the community through a wide range of charitable programmes and activities. Hong Kong thus becomes the first city in Asia to receive this prestigious award in this area.
- In 2005, TVB, in association with the Hong Kong Jockey Club, organised the biggest fund-raising campaign in the company's history in response to South-East Asia's devastating tsunami. It raised over one hundred million Hong Kong Dollars to assist those affected.
- In 2000, TVB Australia was established for the Australian market with a 17 channel (14 Chinese and 3 Vietnamese Channel) satellite service. Which has over 25,000 households and over 1,500 commercial outlets with an audience of over 130,000 daily.
- From 31 March 2008, TVBS-Europe launched their "Multi-channel" package in Europe. It consists of 5 different channels which include the existing TVBS-Europe Channel plus the addition of TVBN, TVB Entertainment News, TVB Classic and TVB Lifestyle.

== Location ==
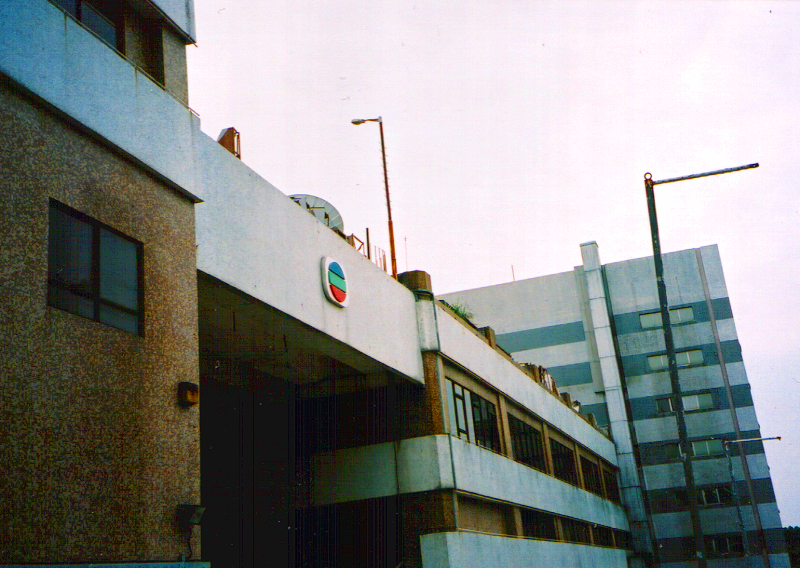
TVB Clear Water Bay headquarters in 2002

TVB was originally located on Broadcast Drive in Kowloon Tong, and was neighbours with RTHK and ATV. By the late 1980s, the company had out-grown the facility at Broadcast Drive, and built a new studio complex, named T.V. City, at 220 Clear Water Bay Road in November 1988. The first TVB City was in fact the old Shaw Movie Town complex used by Shaw Brothers since 1958. The old Broadcast Drive headquarters was later converted into apartments. The first TVB City is now used by Celestial Pictures.

To cope with future development and expansion, TVB began planning in 1998 to develop a replacement facility at the Tseung Kwan O Industrial Estate. The new HK$2.2 billion TVB City came into full operation in October 2003. The new headquarters are built on by far the largest piece of land ever leased by the then Hong Kong Industrial Estates Corporation and the first service-providing company in the area. It has a building area of over 110,000 square metres, 30% more than that of the previous facilities at Clear Water Bay. Studio 1 in TVB City, which can seat an audience of six hundred and thirty, is the largest television production studio among commercial television stations in Asia.

== News operation ==
TVB broadcasts several news programmes, such as News at 6:30 (Jade) and News at 7:30 (Pearl). It also operates its own news channel, TVBN. (Chinese: TVB新聞台; Jyutping: TVB san1 man4 toi4) and TVBN2 (TVB新聞2台; TVB san1 man4 ji6 toi4), through TVB Network Vision (無綫網絡電視; mou4 sin3 mong5 lok3 din6 si6).

== Subsidiaries ==
77 Atelier Limited (Chinese: 77工作室有限公司), rebranded from TVB New Wings Limited in 2022, is a Hong Kong-based television drama production studio and a subsidiary of TVB. The company uses a small-team, project-based production model, focusing on story-driven content and incorporating external collaborators, representing a different approach from TVB's traditional in-house production system. In addition to its in-house productions, 77 Atelier collaborates with mainland Chinese streaming platforms, including Youku and Tencent, for drama production and content distribution. As of 2025, Shu-kai Chung serves as the executive producer.

TVB Music Group Limited is a Hong Kong record label and a subsidiary of TVB. Prior to its establishment, TVB's music-related operations were managed by TVB Music Limited, which was incorporated in 2004 and handled the production and distribution of television soundtracks. The present-day TVB Music Group originated from Stars Shine International, an independent music label founded by producer Herman Ho. In October 2013, TVB acquired a stake in Stars Shine International to form a new music venture focused on producing television soundtracks and managing artists from TVB's singing competitions. The joint venture was launched in November 2013 as The Voice Entertainment Group (Chinese: 星夢娛樂集團有限公司), named after TVB programmes such as The Voice (2009–2015) and The Voice of the Stars (2013). Stars Shine International was dissolved by the end of 2013, with its artists and operations absorbed into the new company. Herman Ho was chief executive officer until his resignation in February 2021 during a period of broader management restructuring at TVB. In October 2021, the company launched the sublabel All About Music (Chinese: 愛爆音樂) to support artists from the Stars Academy singing competition. In April 2022, the company was rebranded as TVB Music Group following further leadership changes and corporate restructuring.

== Notable shows from TVB ==
- Enjoy Yourself Tonight or EYT (1967–1994), a long-running variety show which has been compared with the American Saturday Night Live.
- The Bund (1980), starring Chow Yun-fat. The drama was a success throughout Asia, inspiring several television and film adaptations.
- The Legend of the Condor Heroes (1983), a serial adaptation of Louis Cha's wuxia novel of the same name, starring Felix Wong and Barbara Yung, It is one the most-watched Hong Kong drama in the Greater China region.
- The Return of the Condor Heroes (1983), sequel to The Legend of the Condor Heroes, is a serial adaptation of Louis Cha's wuxia novel of the same name, starring Andy Lau and Idy Chan.
- Looking Back in Anger (1989), is a tragic serial drama starring Felix Wong, Deric Wan, and Carina Lau. It is the most-watched Hong Kong drama in the Greater China region.
- The Greed of Man (1992), starring Adam Cheng and Sean Lau. Its original broadcast heavily impacted international stockbrokers, creating the phenomenon known as the Ting Hai effect.
- The File of Justice series (1992–1997) was a popular legal drama series, spanning five seasons. It is regarded by some as the Hong Kong version of the American Law & Order.
- A Kindred Spirit (1995–1999), the second longest-running drama series in Hong Kong television history.
- Super Trio Series (1995–2023), a popular variety game show.
- Journey to the West (1996) was one of the few TVB Jade programmes to be dubbed in English and rebroadcast on TVB Pearl.
- Old Time Buddy (1997), a comedy-drama that satires Hong Kong's filming industry in the 1960s. It was the first drama to win "Best Drama" at the inaugural TVB Anniversary Awards.
- Secret of the Heart (1998), a soap opera that popularised relationship triangles in serial dramas.
- The Armed Reaction series (1998–2004) was a popular crime drama series dealing with discrimination women face within the police force. The series spanned five seasons with the latest Armed Reaction 2021.
- The Healing Hands series (1998–2005) was a popular medical drama series known for its remarkable medical accuracy. It is commonly known as Hong Kong's version of America's ER. The first season yielded "Best Drama" award in 1998.
- At the Threshold of an Era (1999–2000) is an epic drama featuring a large ensemble cast. It is TVB's second most expensive drama to date.
- War of the Genders (2000), a sitcom starring Carol Cheng and Dayo Wong, is considered by many as TVB's most critically acclaimed sitcom. It held the title as TVB's highest-rated drama (49 points) until the broadcast of Korea's Jewel in the Palace in 2005. Cheng won "Best Actress" for her role.
- Virtues of Harmony (2001–2005) is one of the longest running sitcoms in Hong Kong, yielding two seasons – a historical costume series with a modern-day spin-off.
- Square Pegs (2003), a drama serial starring Roger Kwok, depicts the life of a young man with a mental disability. It received an average viewership rating of 37 points, the highest in TVB's broadcast history. Kwok also won "Best Actor" for his role. A second series was released in 2005, yielding Kwok his second "Best Actor" award.
- Triumph in the Skies (2003) and Triumph in the Skies II (2013), a drama series revolving around the staff and pilots working for Solar Airways, a fictional version of Cathay Pacific. Triumph in the Skies was also adapted into a motion picture.
- War and Beauty (2004), a costume drama serial that focuses on four concubines of the Jiaqing Emperor. The series popularised historical palace harem dramas.
- Moonlight Resonance (2008), the sister production of Heart of Greed (2007). The drama peaked to 50 points, one of the highest in Hong Kong television history.
- EU (2009), the third season of The Academy series. Michael Tse's character, Laughing Gor, inspired one film spin-off and one sequel television series.
- Rosy Business (2009), award-winning costume drama, swept the 2009 TVB Anniversary Awards in almost all major categories.
- Beyond the Realm of Conscience (2009), a costume period drama that peaked to 50 points, one of the highest in Hong Kong television history.
- When Heaven Burns (2011), "Best Drama" winner at the 2012 TVB Anniversary Awards. Despite its critical acclaim, it is one of the lowest-rated series in television history. The last few episodes were also banned in mainland China due to references of the Tiananmen Square protests of 1989.
- Line Walker (2014), a crime drama that spawned teo film sequel and a television series prequel Line Walker: The Prelude (2017) and sequel Line Walker: Bull Fight (2020). It is the most-viewed Hong Kong drama in mainland China, with over 2 billion views on Youku. It has also created a 2 episode game show called Line Walker Hunting Game (2017).
- A Fist Within Four Walls (2016), a martial arts drama set in Kowloon Walled City that won Best TVB Drama at all the award presentations, with many of the cast from A Fist Within Four Walls winning awards. It swept the TVB 2016 Award Presentation with 5 awards: My Favourite TVB Female Character, My Favourite TVB Male Character, Best Actor, Best Actress, and Best Drama Series.
- Come Home Love: Lo and Behold (2017-2026), the TV series with the most episodes in Hong Kong that revolves around a middle-class family and an affluent family. Due to the sensational ratings, the drama had been aired every day at 20:00 to 20:30.
- Legal Mavericks (2017) Swept TVB Starhub Awards 2017
- The Queen of News (2023) ranked as the overall ratings champion drama of the year.

== Corruption probe ==
On 11 March 2010, the general manager Stephen Chan Chi Wan and four others were arrested on corruption charges by the Independent Commission Against Corruption (ICAC). TVB confirmed that three of their employees were involved, and that their duties and work had been suspended pending further development. Stephen Chan Chi Wan was charged with corruption in September 2010 with TVB declining to comment on the situation. Stephen Chan and his co-accused were acquitted by a court in September 2011.

== Controversy and criticism ==
Since the 4 June rally in 2009, TVB has been increasingly criticised for its pro-China bias. Netizens of HKGolden and LIHKG have called it "CCTVB", a portmanteau of "TVB" with Chinese state broadcaster CCTV.

During the 2014 and 2019–20 Hong Kong protests, TVB's programmes, most especially its news reports, were accused of providing biased coverage of the protests, with a pro-China slant. As a result of public boycotts, numerous brands officially pulled out of advertising contracts with TVB, including Pocari Sweat and Pizza Hut.

A group of TVB shareholders issued a public letter addressed to the board of directors of TVB in 2023, accusing TVB of misleading its shareholders on the official name of the company that holds executive power; investment failure in SMI and State Reserve Energy Bonds, which resulted in a loss of $HK1bn for the company. It also questioned the company's investment on its eCommerce platform "Ztore" as the online platform requires improvement and investment in logistics and warehouse, "Sales of 'Ztore' increased as it placed a lot of ads on TVB, however this might result in huge loss for TVB."

== Decline ==
On 29 June 2018, the South China Morning Post quoted insider information that TVBI and the Broadcast Operation Department had laid off 100 people for two consecutive days. By July, a cutdown by 30 in the sports department was announced, leaving only 5 people. The long-established show Sports World aired its final episode on 7 July 2018. myTV SUPER sports channel will end on 15 August. By July, the "Hong Kong Animation Information Network" Facebook page stated that the dubbing group of about 70 people had been cut to 4, and there would be large-scale layoffs. Netizens expressed anger at this.

TVB's general manager Shin Keong Cheong said he did not renew his contract and denied the layoffs. By August, in the interim results of TV broadcasting, the print version of TVB Weekly had been suspended and switched to an online version. The TVB8 and TVB Galaxy websites serving overseas ceased service in September 2018. MyTV Super's TVB Sports Channel and live news station had also stopped broadcasting with the TVB Travel Channel. It is reported that TVB will lay off 800 people. On 5 October, the same year, TVB announced the reduction of about 150 employees from TVB Weekly, the Production Coordination Department, the Arts Division and non-drama productions, which took effect on the same day. The layoffs included at least one producer and two directors of Pleasure & Leisure.

In December 2019, pro-government broadsheet Sing Tao Daily reported that TVB's current chairman, Charles Chan, is about to withdraw from his shares and intends to resign as chairman to leave TV Broadcasting Co., Ltd. On 16 December, chief executive Mark Lee issued an internal notice stating that about 350 employees would be cut, accounting for about 10% of the company's remaining employees. Following this, on 20 December, more than 50 behind-the-scenes staff members were fired, most of them from the variety show and the information, cultural and educational departments. On 20 January 2020, Charles Chan finally resigned as the chairman of the TVB board and as a non-executive director, and will sell all television broadcasting shares.

In 2020, TVB signed Youku to expand mainland Chinese market. Drama co-production revenue grew by 72% after TVB signed coproduction agreements with Youku and Tencent.

In 2021, TVB acquired a local e-commerce platform Ztore which owned and operated ztore.com and neigbuy.com.

In 2023, a survey by The Communications Authority showed that some viewers said TVB's reality shows kept up with the current trend and the content was interesting, some said that its dramas and variety shows were repetitive in content, lacking creativity and were not appealing to viewers. In addition, some said there were too many programmes on Greater Bay Area (GBA) which were boring. Some audience was annoyed by the excessive use of product placements in programmes like "Scoop" (東張西望) and "Come Home Love: Lo And Behold" (愛·回家之開心速遞). Indirect advertising of "Big Big Shop" was also considered excessive. There were also views concerning TVB often broadcast programmes with political stances, advertised products of companies in which TVB had an interest and made use of its TV platform for marketing. There was also suggestion that TVB News Channel should be terminated.

In April 2024, TVB merged J2 with the TVB Finance, Sports & Information Channel to form TVB Plus, and leased the latter's frequency to Phoenix Television's Phoenix Hong Kong Channel. TVB stated that the changes were expected to result in $100 million in cost savings.

In August 2024, TVB reported that its net loss has narrowed by 65% year-on-year (YoY) to $143m in H1 2024.

On 24 July 2026, TVB officially changed its name from Television Broadcasts Limited to TVB Limited.

== Board of Directors ==
| Board of Directors | |
|---|---|
| Executive Chairman | Thomas Hui To JP |
| Non-executive Director | Li Ruigang |
| Non-executive Director | Anthony Lee Hsien Pin |
| Non-executive Director | Kenneth Hsu Kin |
| Independent Non-executive Director | Dr. William LO Wing Yan JP |
| Independent Non-executive Director | Dr. Allan Zeman GBM, GBS, JP |
| Independent Non-executive Director | Felix Fong Wo BBS, JP |

== Senior Management ==
| Senior Management | |
|---|---|
| CEO | Catherina Tsang Lai Chun |
| General Manager (Content Operations) | Eric Tsang |
| General Manager (Business Operations) | Siu Sai Wo |
| Deputy General Manager (Legal and International Operations) | Desmond Chan Shu Hung |
| Chief Financial Officer | Ian Lee Hock Lye |
| Assistant General Manager (Human and Production Resources) | Kevin Tse Wai Kwong |
| Assistant General Manager (Drama Production) | Catherina Tsang Lai Chun |
| Assistant General Manager (News and Information Services) | Yuen Chi Wai |
| Assistant General Manager (Talent Management and Development) | Virginia Lok Yee Ling |
| Assistant General Manager (Corporate Communications) | Bonnie Wong Tak Wei |

On 2 November 2021, Bonnie Wong joined TVB and became the company's Assistant General Manager of the Corporate Communications division at the end of 2023.

== Channel list ==
=== Hong Kong Free-to-air ===
- TVB Jade
- TVB Plus (formerly TVB J2 & TVB Finance, Sports & Information Channel)
- TVB News Channel
- TVB Pearl

=== MyTV Super ===
TVB Network Vision ceased its service since 1 June 2017, and the OTT platform named MyTV Super (expanded from MyTV and GOTV) replace TVB Network Vision to provide the paid television service. In addition, the company name of "TVB Network Vision" became "Big Big Channel". In 2024, Big Big Channel cease operation.

- Channel 18 (Horse Racing)
- Asian Drama
- Chinese Drama
- Chinese Opera Channel
- Entertainment News
- SUPER Kids Channel
- TVB Classic (Aired Dramas at 2000s to now)
- Super FREE
- Golden Classic (Aired Programming from 1967 to 1999)
- Golden Chinese Drama
- Golden Jade

=== International ===
- Asian Action Channel
- Hub Cantonese on Demand (Co-owned with Starhub; Singapore only)
- Hub Drama First (Starhub, Singapore only)
- Fairchild TV (20% ownership; co-owned with Fairchild Group)
- Jadeworld (USA)
- TVB Chinese Opera Channel (International version)
- TVB Entertainment News (International version)
- TVB Jade (International version)
- TVB Korea Channel
- TVB Lifestyle
- TVB News Channel (International version)
- TVB Finance, Sports & Information Channel (International version)
- TVB Vietnam (localised feed licensed for a domestic cable channel)
- TVB Xing He (Asia version only)
- TVB-Europe
- TVB Jade Southeast Asia (Malaysia & Singapore)
- Hub VV Drama (Starhub, Singapore only; Selected TVB Drama in Mandarin dubbed)
- TVB Queen (International version)
- TVB Comedy (International version)

=== Malaysia ===
Co-owned with Astro:

- Astro AOD HD
- Astro Wah Lai Toi On Demand
- TVB Classic Malaysia
- TVB Jade Southeast Asia
- TVB Xing He
- TVBS-Asia

=== Thailand ===
- TVB Drama Thai Channel (V2H8)
- TVB Thai Treat

=== Cambodia ===
- TVB Cambodia Drama
- TVB Cambodia - Romance & Comedy

== See also ==
- List of Hong Kong companies
- List of Taiwan companies
- TVB News
- TVBS
- HKTV
- TVB DAIFU
