= TVB City =

Location in Hong Kong

TVB
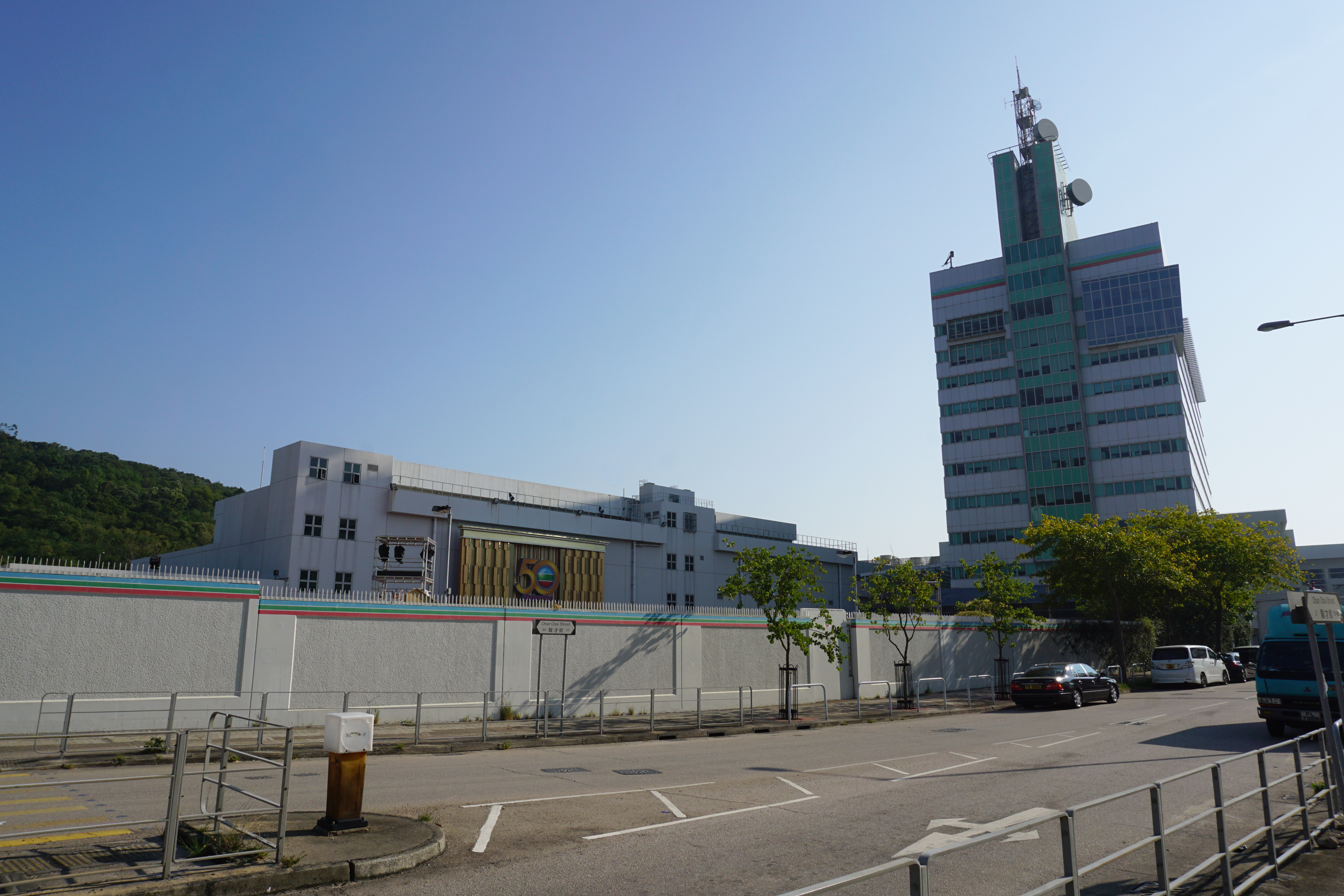
- Overview of TVB

- Location within Hong Kong

General information
- Location: 77 Chun Choi Street; Tseung Kwan O Industrial Estate; Tseung Kwan O, New Territories, Hong Kong, China
- Coordinates: 22°16′45″N 114°16′21″E
- Groundbreaking: 8 March 2000; 26 years ago
- Construction started: 8 March 2000; 26 years ago
- Completed: 21 September 2003; 23 years ago
- Opened: 22 September 2003; 23 years ago
- Inaugurated: 12 October 2003; 23 years ago 1 December 2020; 5 years ago (All HDTV)
- Renovated: 22 February 2016; 10 years ago (All HDTV)
- Cost: 2.2 billion HKD

Design and construction
- Architects: Gensler International and Leigh & Orange Architects
- Developer: Sun Hung Kai Properties
- Structural engineer: Dragages et Travaux publics (HK)

TVB, previously known as TVB City (Chinese: 電視廣播城; Jyutping: din6 si6 gwong2 bo3 sing4), is the headquarters of TVB Limited (TVB) since 2003 developed by Sun Hung Kai Properties located at 77 Chun Choi Street in the Tseung Kwan O Industrial Estate, Tseung Kwan O, New Territories, Hong Kong.

The HK$2.2 billion facility officially opened on 12 October 2003, with Chief Executive Tung Chee-hwa and TVB chairman Raymond Chow in attendance. The 110,000 m^{2} (1,200,000 sq ft) facility, which replaced TV City, was designed to allow for future developments such as digital television production. The facilities include an 11-story broadcasting centre, workshops, a newsroom, a satellite antenna farm, two outdoor shooting sites and 22 production studios, of which "Studio 1" is one of the largest studio amongst all commercial television broadcasters in Asia.

== Facilities ==
- 24/7 News and Information which Basement Block – used for news and information which car park opening 24-hours 7-days a week.
- Outdoor Shooting Sites – features buildings for traditional Chinese town and generic early 20th century Hong Kong settings
- Workshop Block
- Main Block – along with Studio Road, it is often used as generic office building/hotel scenes for TVB's modern dramas
- Variety Studio Block – used for shooting variety and specials
- Drama Studio Block – used for shooting drama shows
- Satellite Antenna Farm
