= Phoenix Television =

Chinese state-owned television network

Phoenix Media Investment (Holdings) Limited

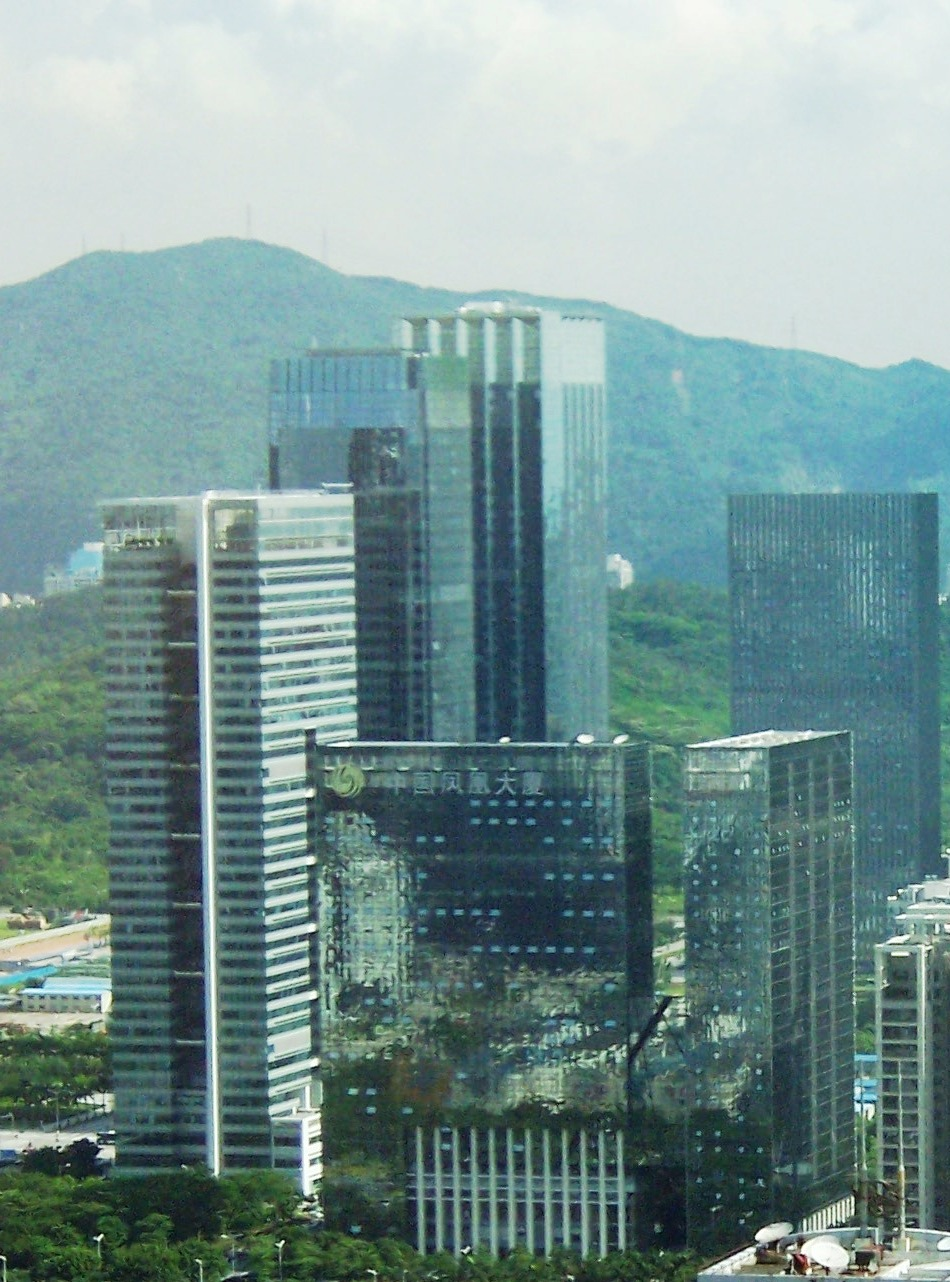
- Headquarters in Shenzhen
- Native name: 鳳凰衛視投資（控股）有限公司
- Type: Public; State-owned enterprise
- Traded as: SEHK: 2008; NYSE: FENG
- Industry: Broadcasting
- Founded: 31 March 1996; 30 years ago
- Headquarters: Shenzhen, Guangdong, China; Tai Po, Hong Kong
- Key people: Liu Changle (Founder; former chairman and chief executive officer), Chui Keung (Deputy chief executive officer, Chief Compliance Officer), Liu Shuang (Chief Operating Officer of Phoenix Satellite TV, CEO of Phoenix New Media)
- Products: Television content, Television programming
- Parent: Bauhinia Culture
- Website: www.ifeng.com

Phoenix Chinese Channel
- Country: China
- Broadcast area: Worldwide

Programming
- Picture format: HDTV 1080i

Ownership
- Owner: Phoenix Television
- Sister channels: Phoenix InfoNews Channel; Phoenix Chinese News and Entertainment Channel; Phoenix North America Chinese Channel; Phoenix Movies Channel; Phoenix Hong Kong Channel

History
- Launched: 31 March 1996
- Replaced: Star Chinese Channel

Phoenix Chinese Channel
- Traditional Chinese: 鳳凰衛視中文台
- Simplified Chinese: 凤凰卫视中文台
Transcriptions
Standard Mandarin
- Hanyu Pinyin: Fènghuáng Wèishì Zhōngwén Tái
Yue: Cantonese
- Jyutping: fung6 wong4 wai6 si6 zung1 man4 toi4

Alternative Chinese name
- Traditional Chinese: 鳳凰衛視
- Simplified Chinese: 凤凰卫视
Transcriptions
Standard Mandarin
- Hanyu Pinyin: Fènghuáng Wèishì
Yue: Cantonese
- Jyutping: fung6 wong4 wai6 si6

Phoenix Television is a majority state-owned television network that operates Mandarin and Cantonese-language channels serving mainland China, Hong Kong, Macau, and other regions with significant Chinese-speaking audiences. It is headquartered in Shenzhen and Hong Kong and is also registered in the Cayman Islands.

The network was founded by Liu Changle (劉長樂), who previously was an officer and political instructor in the People's Liberation Army with the 40th Group Army. Following the Cultural Revolution, Liu worked as a journalist for the Chinese Communist Party (CCP)-controlled China National Radio and maintained close ties with the CCP leadership. He is also a standing member of the National Committee of the Chinese People's Political Consultative Conference.

Phoenix Television identifies itself as a Hong Kong media organisation, but it holds a non-domestic television programme services licence in Hong Kong. The majority of its customers and non-current assets are located in mainland China. Its largest shareholder is Bauhinia Culture, a company wholly owned by the Chinese government. Freedom House characterises Phoenix Television as pro-Beijing, while Stephen McDonell of BBC News noted that it is "sometimes more liberal than its mainland counterparts".

The company's head offices are located in Shenzhen, Guangdong, and Tai Po, Hong Kong, with correspondent offices in Beijing and Shanghai. The Shenzhen office produces about half of its television output.

== History ==
Phoenix Television originated as a joint venture between Star TV in Hong Kong, a private company in China, and China Central Television.

The Phoenix Chinese Channel was launched on 31 March 1996, replacing Star Chinese Channel in Hong Kong and mainland China. Broadcasts in Singapore began on 1 December 1996 via the Singapore Cable Vision network. In its early years, the Phoenix Chinese Channel also carried Mandarin-dubbed American series during primetime hours, including The X-Files and Baywatch.

Phonenix CNE began broadcasting in Europe on 1 August 1999, and the Phoenix North America Chinese Channel launched for audiences across the Americas on 1 January 2001. In 2005, a California-based broadcast and engineering director for the network, Tai Wang Mak, was arrested for conspiring with his brother, Chi Mak, to act as an intelligence agent for China. He was sentenced to ten years in prison in 2008.

On 28 March 2011, Phoenix Television launched the Phoenix Hong Kong Channel, which broadcasts exclusively in Cantonese.

On 31 March 2011, Phoenix InfoNews Channel was recognised with a Peabody Award for its "Report on a New Generation of Migrant Workers in China".

In 2011, Phoenix New Media partnered with the BBC to distribute the broadcaster's programmes on its digital media platforms. In 2012, it entered into a similar agreement with the National Film Board of Canada, under which 130 animated shorts and documentary films were made available digitally in China.

In October 2013, 21st Century Fox sold its 12.15% stake in Phoenix Television (held through Star) to TPG Capital for HK$1.66 billion (US$213 million).

In February 2016, Phoenix Television broadcast forced confessions of kidnapped Hong Kong booksellers.

In June 2020, the FCC ordered XEWW-AM, owned by Phoenix Television, to cease broadcasting in the United States.

The Taiwanese government designated Phoenix Television as a Chinese government-funded company in April 2022 and required it to cease operations in Taiwan.

During the Russian invasion of Ukraine, a Phoenix Television reporter was among the few foreign journalists to embed with the Russian military.

== Corporate governance ==
=== Ownership ===
At its launch, Star TV and a private company in China each held 45% of Phoenix Television, while state broadcaster China Central Television owned the remaining 10%.

The shares held by the original News Corporation (and later 21st Century Fox) through Star were gradually reduced over the years. In October 2013, 21st Century Fox sold its remaining stake to TPG Capital.

According to the company's 2018 annual report, its ownership structure was as follows:

Name	Shares	Percentage	Note
Today's Asia Limited	1,854,000,000	37.13%	Wholly owned by Liu Changle.
Extra Step Investments Limited	983,000,000	19.69%	A company owned by China Mobile Hong Kong, which is a part of state-owned China Mobile.
TPG China Media, L.P.	607,000,000	12.16%	Part of TPG Capital, beneficially controlled by David Bonderman and James Coulter.
China Wise International Limited	412,000,000	8.25%	Owned by Bank of China, which is controlled by Central Huijin Investment, a subsidiary of the sovereign wealth fund China Investment Corporation, which reports to the State Council of the People's Republic of China.

In April 2021, Liu Changle sold most of his shares to the state-owned publisher Bauhinia Culture and Shun Tak Holdings.

=== Management ===
Liu Changle (劉長樂), founder and CEO of Phoenix Television, previously worked as a journalist for the Chinese Communist Party-controlled China National Radio following the Cultural Revolution. By the 1990s, he had become one of China's wealthiest individuals and maintained strong connections to the Beijing leadership.

Shuang Liu (刘爽) was appointed chief operating officer (COO) of Phoenix Television on 17 February 2014. He also is CEO of Phoenix New Media (NYSE: FENG), a Chinese digital media company.

Chung Pong, a former director of Phoenix Television news, testified under oath that the network's programming was "subject to the dictates of the leadership of the Central Communist Propaganda Department, Central Communist Overseas Propaganda Office, and the Ministry of Foreign Affairs."

== See also ==
- List of programs broadcast by Phoenix Television
