= Chinese Pakistani =

Chinese Pakistani or Pakistani Chinese may refer to:

- China–Pakistan relations (c.f. "a Chinese-Pakistani treaty")
- Chinese people in Pakistan
  - Uyghurs in Pakistan
- Pakistanis in China
  - Pakistanis in Hong Kong
- Pakistani Chinese cuisine, a style of Chinese cuisine developed by Chinese migrants to Pakistan
