= Keina Chiu =

Japanese-Chinese television news journalist

- Born: March 25, 1995 (age 31)
- Education: The University of Hong Kong; St. Paul's Convent School
- Occupations: Anchor, journalist, producer
- Years active: 2018–present
- Notable credit(s): Reporter and Anchor, TVB Pearl; Producer, The Pearl Report

Keina Chiu (traditional Chinese: 趙慧奈; born March 25, 1995) is a Japanese-Chinese television news journalist. She is best known for her role as anchor on TVB Pearl. She has been seen reporting bilingually for the network's Chinese-speaking channels, TVB Jade and TVB News Channel as well. Chiu attended St. Paul's Convent School and obtained her bachelor's degree at the University of Hong Kong.

== Career ==
2017: Her career in broadcasting began when she joined Now News as a news intern.

2018: In February, Chiu joined Hong Kong's largest broadcaster, Television Broadcasts Limited, as a producer for the network's award-winning 30-year-old documentary show, "The Pearl Report". Following the show's axing in May, Chiu joined the daily news team and debuted as a "Weather Report" presenter in August the same year.

2019: Chiu made her first appearance as anchor on Pearl reading "News Headlines" and the nightly late news, "News Roundup". She was also put on business shows including "Market Place" and "Market Watch", where she spoke to analysts from Haitong International. Chiu was the host for "Financial Review 2019".

2020: Chiu went on to anchor the prime-time "Financial Report" and "Financial Bulletin", which came after the late news. Scheduled programmes aside, Chiu also anchored multiple segments of "News Flash", covering breaking news for Super Typhoon Wipha, Tropical Storm Higos, and major political events including the Anti-Extradition Law Amendment Bill Movement, 2019 District Council Election, and the Hong Kong national security law legislation. Chiu was a winner of the Asiavision Awards for Outstanding Reporting of a News Story. Prior to joining TVB News, Chiu was a writer for Jumpstart Magazine and Coconuts Media. She is fluent in Cantonese, English, Mandarin and Japanese.

2021: After approximately four years on the job, Chiu left TVB after her last "News Headlines" and subsequently joined Bloomberg as a producer.
