= Priscilla Ng =

Hong Kong television journalist

Priscilla Ng Che Ning, (Chinese: 吳芷寧) is a former English-speaking television journalist in Hong Kong. She worked at TVB News and served as an anchor and reporter. She currently works as a writer and freelance columnist.

She was the first batch of Bachelor of Journalism graduates at The University of Hong Kong in 2007. She had been a reporter of Star News Asia since 2005, but the program was suspended in early 2008. Afterward, she joined TVB News in 2008.

She was the host of "Hong Kong Review 2009". She was the newscaster of several news programs on TVB Pearl, namely News At Seven-Thirty, News headlines, Marketplace, World Market Update and News roundup. At times, she anchored the Weather Report.

She resigned and left TVB on February 14, 2012.
