= Money Magazine (TV program) =

Hong Kong TV program

- Genre: Financial News
- Created by: TVB News
- Presented by: Melissa Gecolea
- Country of origin: Hong Kong

Production
- Executive producer: Michael Wong
- Producer: TVB
- Production location: Hong Kong
- Running time: 30 minutes

Original release
- Network: TVB Pearl
- Release: 6 June 1995 – 29 June 2018

Money Magazine is a business news and financial programme that is broadcast on Fridays at 8:00 pm in Hong Kong by television channel TVB Pearl. Its re-run is aired after 11 am the next day. The show is also available on TVB News and MyTVSuper mobile apps, and on TVB's website.

After 22 years on air, the final episode of Money Magazine was aired on 29 June 2018. The successor of the program is Pearl Magazine, which merges Money Magazine and the current affairs program The Pearl Report on the channel.

== Producers and reporters ==
The Money Magazine team is made up of executive producer Michael Wong and reporters. As of 2018, they are:

- Melissa Gecolea
- Alice Kan
- Zela Chin
- Jennifer Chan
- Natalie Cheng
