= Demographics of Hong Kong =

- Population pyramid of Hong Kong in 2020
- Population: 7,503,100 (2024 est.)
- Growth rate: 0.12% (2024 est.)
- Birth rate: 7.6 births/1,000 population (2024 est.)
- Death rate: 8.1 deaths/1,000 population (2024 est.)
- Life expectancy: 84 years
  - male: 81.3 years
  - female: 86.8 years (2024 est.)
- Fertility rate: 0.84 children born/woman (2024 est.)
- Infant mortality: 2.5 deaths/1,000 live births (2024 est.)
- Net migration rate: 1.6 migrant(s)/1,000 population (2024 est.)

Age structure
- 0–14 years: ▼10.3% (2025 est.)
- 15–64 years: ▼66.0% (2025 est.)
- 65 and over: ▲23.7% (2025 est.)

Sex ratio
- Total: 0.86 male(s)/female (2024 est.)
- At birth: 1.06 male(s)/female
- Under 15: 1.1 male(s)/female
- 65 and over: 0.86 male(s)/female

Nationality
- Nationality: Chinese
- Major ethnic: Cantonese people

Language
- Official: Cantonese (85.4%), English (4.5%), Mandarin (2.2%), other Chinese dialects 2.8%, other 2%, persons under 5 or mute 3.2% (2021 est.)

Demographic features of the population of Hong Kong include population density, ethnicity, education level, the health of the populace, religious affiliations, and other aspects.

Hong Kong is one of the most densely populated areas in the world, with an overall density of some 6,300 people per square kilometre. At the same time, Hong Kong has one of the world's lowest birth rates—0.68 per woman of child-bearing age as of 2022, far below the replacement rate of 2.1. It is estimated that 26.8% of the population will be aged 65 or more in 2033, up from 12.1% in 2005. Hong Kong recorded a crude birth rate of 8.2 per 1,000 people on average annually in 2005–2010.

Ethnically, Hong Kong mainly consists of Chinese who constitute approximately 92% of the population. Of these, many originate from various regions in Guangdong. There are also a number of descendants of immigrants from elsewhere in Southern China during and after the Chinese Civil War.

== Terminology ==
People from Hong Kong generally refer to themselves, in Cantonese, as Hèung Góng Yàhn (Chinese: 香港人; Cantonese Yale: Hèung Góng Yàhn; lit. 'Hong Kong people'); however, the term is not restricted to those of Chinese descent, owing to Hong Kong's roughly 160-year colonial history that saw the civil servants and traders of British, Indian, Russian and other ethnic groups stationed in Hong Kong.

In English, the term 'Hongkongers' (or sometimes 'Hong Kongers') is also used to refer to Hong Kongese people, while the term 'Hongkongese' is sometimes used as an adjective to describe people or things related to Hong Kong.

== Population size and structure ==
Historical population
Year	Pop.	±% p.a.
1841	7,450	—
1851	32,983	+16.04%
1861	119,320	+13.72%
1871	120,124	+0.07%
1881	160,402	+2.93%
1891	221,441	+3.28%
1901	368,987	+5.24%
1911	456,739	+2.16%
1921	625,166	+3.19%
1931	840,473	+3.00%
1941	1,639,000	+6.91%
1945	600,000	−22.22%
1951	2,070,000	+22.92%
1961	3,128,648	+4.22%
1971	3,936,630	+2.32%
1981	5,183,400	+2.79%
1991	5,752,000	+1.05%
2001	6,714,300	+1.56%
2011	7,071,600	+0.52%
2021	7,413,070	+0.47%
Sources: Census and Statistics Department, CICRED, Office for National Statistics

The following census data is available for Hong Kong between the years 1841–2011. In 2011, Hong Kong had a population of just over 7 million, with a density of approximately 6,300 people per square kilometer. This makes Hong Kong the fourth most densely populated region in the world, after Macau, Monaco, and Singapore.

Population graph of Hong Kong

=== Age groups ===
==== United Nations data ====
According to United Nations estimates from 1 July 2013, Hong Kong's population is distributed in the following age ranges, with the largest age group represented being 50–54 years:

Population, fertility rate and net reproduction rate, United Nations estimates

Age group	Male	Female	Total	%
Total	3,330,700	3,856,800	7,187,500	100
0–4	134,500	125,700	260,200	3.62
5–9	128,000	120,200	248,200	3.45
10–14	149,100	139,600	288,700	4.02
15–19	208,000	196,300	404,300	5.63
20–24	226,400	230,700	457,100	6.36
25–29	221,800	295,800	517,600	7.20
30–34	231,900	343,200	575,100	8.00
35–39	229,500	331,000	560,500	7.80
40–44	239,800	338,700	578,500	8.05
45–49	271,000	337,900	608,900	8.47
50–54	313,500	341,100	654,600	9.11
55–59	281,300	287,900	569,200	7.92
60–64	220,000	223,100	443,100	6.16
65–69	148,800	146,400	295,200	4.11
70–74	109,600	103,700	213,300	2.97
75–79	100,600	109,900	210,500	2.93
80–84	69,500	88,400	157,900	2.20
85+	47,400	97,200	144,600	2.01
Age group	Male	Female	Total	Percent
0–14	411,600	385,500	797,100	11.09
15–64	2,443,200	2,925,700	5,368,900	74.70
65+	475,900	545,600	1,021,500	14.21

Population Estimates by Sex and Age Group (01.VII.2020):

Age group	Male	Female	Total	%
Total	3 416 300	4 065 500	7 481 800	100
0–4	137 400	127 400	264 800	3.54
5–9	154 600	144 800	299 400	4.00
10–14	154 400	150 700	305 100	4.08
15–19	140 100	133 500	273 600	3.66
20–24	192 600	191 900	384 500	5.14
25–29	224 600	257 300	481 900	6.44
30–34	229 800	320 400	550 200	7.35
35–39	237 500	369 300	606 800	8.11
40–44	226 300	343 500	569 800	7.62
45–49	241 500	339 700	581 200	7.77
50–54	241 400	315 400	556 800	7.44
55–59	301 200	343 300	644 500	8.61
60–64	292 400	299 000	591 400	7.90
65–69	223 200	229 900	453 100	6.06
70–74	165 200	171 500	336 700	4.50
75–79	95 100	95 200	190 300	2.54
80–84	79 900	94 000	173 900	2.32
85+	79 100	138 700	217 800	2.91
Age group	Male	Female	Total	Percent
0–14	446 400	422 900	869 300	11.62
15–64	2 327 400	2 913 300	5 240 700	70.05
65+	642 500	729 300	1 371 800	18.34

==== Hong Kong government data ====
The Hong Kong government provides the following estimates for mid-2013:

age	percentage	males	females
0–14 years	11.0%	408,000	382,600
15–24 years	11.7%	424,500	417,900
25–34 years	15.2%	454,900	639,700
35–44 years	15.9%	471,500	671,800
45–54 years	17.7%	587,900	681,700
55–64 years	14.2%	503,700	512,600
65 and over	14.3%	479,500	547,700

Median age: 45.0 (2013 est.)

View source data.
View source data.

== Vital statistics ==
At the end of the 20th century, Hong Kong had one of the lowest birth rates in the world. However, the number of births doubled in the decade between 2001 and 2011, largely due to an increase in the number of children born in Hong Kong to women with residence in mainland China. In 2001 there were 7,810 births to Mainland women (16%) out of a total of 48,219 births. By 2009 it increased to 37,253 births to Mainland women (45%) out of a total of 82,095 births.

Notable events in demography of Hong Kong:

- 1942-1945 – Second World War
- 1950-1965 – Mid-20th-century baby boom
- 2019–2020 Hong Kong protests

	Average population	Live births	Deaths	Natural change	Crude birth rate (per 1,000)	Crude death rate (per 1,000)	Natural change (per 1,000)	Crude migration rate (per 1,000)	TFR
1900	275,000	8,250	3,575	4,675	30.0	13.0	17.0		
1901	283,000	11,886	7,924	3,962	42.0	28.0	14.0	-2.52	
1902	296,828	12,318	8,133	4,185	41.5	27.4	14.1	0.75	
1903	311,331	12,765	8,344	4,421	41.0	26.8	14.2	0.76	
1904	326,543	13,225	8,555	4,670	40.5	26.2	14.3	0.76	
1905	342,504	13,696	8,767	4,929	40.0	25.6	14.4	0.79	
1906	359,254	14,318	8,922	5,396	39.9	24.9	15.0	1.30	
1907	376,834	15,070	9,083	5,987	39.9	24.1	15.8	1.57	
1908	395,289	15,903	9,255	6,648	39.8	23.4	16.4	1.67	
1909	414,667	16,803	9,448	7,355	39.8	22.8	17.0	1.70	
1910	435,018	17,771	9,662	8,109	39.8	22.2	17.6	1.73	
1911	456,000	16,872	10,032	6,840	37.0	22.0	15.0	-2.78	
1912	478,171	17,687	9,995	7,692	37.0	21.4	15.6	1.78	
1913	501,658	18,558	10,196	8,362	36.9	20.8	16.1	1.34	
1914	526,504	19,475	10,407	9,068	36.9	20.1	16.8	1.34	
1915	552,747	20,443	10,628	9,815	36.9	19.5	17.4	1.35	
1916	580,431	21,461	10,858	10,603	36.9	18.9	18.0	1.36	
1917	609,603	22,533	11,098	11,435	36.9	18.4	18.5	1.36	
1918	640,311	23,661	11,348	12,313	36.9	17.9	19.0	1.37	
1919	672,607	24,850	11,608	13,242	36.9	17.4	19.5	1.38	
1920	706,542	26,103	11,878	14,225	36.9	16.9	20.0	1.39	
1921	625,000	23,063	13,125	9,938	37.0	21.0	16.0	-6.86	
1922	655,645	24,276	13,768	10,508	37.0	20.6	16.4	0.87	
1923	687,628	25,460	14,239	11,221	37.0	20.1	16.9	1.04	
1924	721,035	26,678	14,507	12,171	37.0	19.6	17.4	1.32	
1925	755,962	27,930	14,803	13,127	36.9	19.1	17.8	1.27	5.47
1926	792,511	29,156	15,149	14,007	36.8	18.6	18.2	1.11	5.43
1927	830,793	30,567	15,455	15,112	36.8	18.1	18.7	1.33	5.39
1928	870,925	32,069	15,741	16,328	36.8	17.8	19.0	1.40	5.36
1929	913,032	33,612	16,134	17,478	36.8	17.7	19.1	1.26	5.32
1930	957,241	35,295	17,230	18,065	36.8	18.0	18.8	0.61	5.28
1931	849,000	28,017	15,282	12,735	33.0	18.0	15.0	-6.29	5.24
1932	875,463	28,929	15,152	13,777	33.0	17.7	15.3	1.19	5.20
1933	903,089	29,802	14,995	14,807	33.0	17.4	15.6	1.14	5.16
1934	931,950	30,771	14,859	15,912	33.0	17.1	15.9	1.19	5.12
1935	962,120	31,749	14,648	17,101	33.0	16.9	16.1	1.24	5.09
1936	993,685	32,780	14,448	18,332	33.0	16.6	16.4	1.24	5.05
1937	1,026,735	33,881	14,272	19,609	33.0	16.4	16.6	1.24	5.01
1938	1,000,000	33,000	16,000	17,000	33.0	16.0	17.0	-2.61	4.97
1939	1,115,278	36,804	16,829	19,975	33.0	15.1	17.9	2.67	4.93
1940	1,241,666	40,986	17,653	23,333	33.0	14.2	18.8	2.70	4.89
1941	1,640,000	49,200	22,960	26,240	30.0	14.0	16.0	1.77	4.85
1942	1,335,915	35,676	25,581	10,095	26.7	19.2	7.6	-12.09	4.82
1943	1,056,303	31,940	23,332	8,608	30.2	22.1	8.1	-1.41	4.78
1944	818,299	21,915	27,280	−5,365	26.8	33.4	−6.6	-17.08	4.74
1945	600,000	15,000	19,800	−4,800	25.0	33.0	−8.0	0.94	4.70
1946	795,072	20,871	22,262	−1,391	26.2	28.0	−1.8	4.29	4.66
1947	1,053,565	28,973	24,232	4,741	27.5	23.0	4.5	5.82	4.62
1948	1,396,100	40,138	25,130	15,008	28.8	18.0	10.8	7.35	4.59
1949	1,850,000	55,500	24,050	31,450	30.0	13.0	17.0	8.89	4.55
1950	1,974,000	60,600	18,465	42,135	30.7	9.4	21.3	5.41	4.47
1951	2,044,000	68,500	20,580	47,920	34.0	10.2	23.8	2.83	4.44
1952	2,141,000	71,976	19,459	52,517	33.9	9.2	24.7	2.15	4.41
1953	2,253,000	75,544	18,300	57,244	33.7	8.2	25.5	2.10	4.42
1954	2,371,000	83,317	19,283	64,034	35.2	8.2	27.1	2.86	4.46
1955	2,490,000	90,511	19,080	71,431	36.3	7.7	28.7	2.97	4.54
1956	2,607,000	96,746	19,295	77,451	37.0	7.4	29.6	2.31	4.64
1957	2,721,000	97,834	19,365	78,469	35.8	7.1	28.7	0.37	4.75
1958	2,834,000	106,624	20,554	86,070	37.4	7.2	30.2	2.68	4.86
1959	2,951,000	104,579	20,250	84,329	35.2	6.8	28.4	-0.59	4.96
1960	3,075,000	110,667	19,146	91,521	36.1	6.2	29.9	2.34	5.014
1961	3,207,000	108,726	18,738	89,988	34.3	5.9	28.4	-0.48	5.030
1962	3,344,000	119,166	20,933	98,233	36.1	6.3	29.7	2.47	4.980
1963	3,477,000	118,413	20,340	98,073	34.6	5.9	28.7	-0.05	4.857
1964	3,596,000	111,436	18,657	92,779	31.8	5.3	26.5	-1.47	4.665
1965	3,692,000	106,362	18,160	88,202	29.6	5.0	24.5	-1.24	4.422
1966	3,763,000	96,436	19,261	77,175	26.6	5.3	21.3	-2.93	4.152
1967	3,812,000	94,368	20,234	74,134	25.3	5.4	19.9	-0.80	3.887
1968	3,850,000	83,641	19,444	64,197	22.0	5.1	16.9	-2.58	3.649
1969	3,889,000	82,482	19,256	63,226	21.3	5.0	16.4	-0.25	3.448
1970	3,942,000	79,132	19,996	59,136	20.0	5.1	14.9	-1.04	3.284
1971	4,009,000	79,789	20,374	59,415	19.7	5.0	14.7	0.07	3.459
1972	4,088,000	80,344	21,397	58,947	19.5	5.2	14.3	-0.11	3.315
1973	4,180,000	82,252	21,251	61,001	19.5	5.0	14.5	0.49	3.177
1974	4,283,000	83,589	21,879	61,710	19.3	5.1	14.3	0.17	2.967
1975	4,396,000	79,790	21,591	58,168	17.9	4.9	13.0	-0.81	2.666
1976	4,519,000	78,511	22,628	55,883	17.4	5.1	12.3	-0.51	2.480
1977	4,652,000	80,022	23,331	56,691	17.5	5.1	12.4	0.17	2.376
1978	4,788,000	80,957	23,816	57,141	17.3	5.1	12.2	0.09	2.272
1979	4,919,000	81,975	25,110	56,865	16.8	5.1	11.7	-0.06	2.120
1980	5,039,000	85,290	24,995	60,295	17.0	4.9	12.1	0.70	2.047
1981	5,145,000	86,751	24,822	61,929	16.8	4.8	12.0	0.32	1.933
1982	5,239,000	86,120	25,384	60,736	16.4	4.8	11.5	-0.23	1.860
1983	5,322,000	83,293	26,512	56,781	15.6	5.0	10.6	-0.74	1.722
1984	5,394,000	77,297	25,510	51,787	14.4	4.7	9.7	-0.92	1.559
1985	5,456,000	76,126	25,248	50,878	14.0	4.6	9.3	-0.17	1.491
1986	5,508,000	71,620	25,902	45,718	13.0	4.7	8.3	-0.94	1.367
1987	5,551,000	69,958	26,916	43,042	12.6	4.8	7.8	-0.48	1.311
1988	5,592,000	75,412	27,659	47,753	13.4	4.9	8.5	0.84	1.400
1989	5,641,000	69,621	28,745	40,876	12.3	5.1	7.2	-1.22	1.296
1990	5,704,000	67,731	29,136	38,595	12.0	5.1	6.9	-0.40	1.272
1991	5,786,000	68,281	28,429	39,852	12.0	4.9	7.1	0.22	1.281
1992	5,884,000	70,949	30,550	40,399	12.3	5.2	7.1	0.09	1.347
1993	5,992,000	70,451	30,571	39,880	12.0	5.1	6.9	-0.09	1.342
1994	6,101,000	71,646	29,905	41,741	11.9	4.9	7.0	0.31	1.355
1995	6,206,000	68,637	31,468	37,169	11.2	5.1	6.1	-0.74	1.295
1996	6,304,000	63,291	32,176	31,115	9.9	5.1	4.8	-0.96	1.191
1997	6,492,000	59,250	31,738	27,512	9.1	4.9	4.2	-0.56	1.127
1998	6,550,000	52,977	32,847	20,130	8.1	5.0	3.1	-1.13	1.016
1999	6,611,000	51,281	33,255	18,026	7.8	5.0	2.7	-0.32	0.981
2000	6,675,000	54,134	33,758	20,376	8.1	5.1	3.1	0.35	1.032
2001	6,721,000	48,219	33,378	14,841	7.2	5.0	2.2	-0.82	0.931
2002	6,728,000	48,209	34,267	13,942	7.1	5.1	2.0	-0.13	0.941
2003	6,745,000	46,965	36,971	9,994	7.0	5.5	1.5	-0.59	0.901
2004	6,781,000	49,796	36,918	12,878	7.3	5.4	1.9	0.43	0.922
2005	6,818,000	57,098	38,830	18,268	8.4	5.7	2.7	0.79	0.959
2006	6,871,000	65,626	37,457	28,169	9.6	5.5	4.1	1.44	0.984
2007	6,921,000	70,875	39,476	31,399	10.2	5.7	4.5	0.47	1.028
2008	6,951,000	78,822	41,796	37,026	11.3	6.0	5.3	0.81	1.064
2009	6,980,000	82,095	41,175	40,920	11.8	5.9	5.9	0.56	1.055
2010	7,024,000	88,584	42,194	46,390	12.6	6.0	6.6	0.78	1.127
2011	7,072,000	95,451	42,346	53,105	13.5	5.9	7.6	0.95	1.204
2012	7,155,000	91,558	43,917	47,641	12.8	6.1	6.7	-0.76	1.285
2013	7,187,000	57,084	43,397	13,687	7.9	6.0	1.9	-4.72	1.125
2014	7,242,000	62,305	45,087	17,218	8.6	6.2	2.4	0.49	1.235
2015	7,306,000	59,878	46,108	13,770	8.2	6.3	1.9	-0.47	1.196
2016	7,337,000	60,856	46,905	13,951	8.3	6.4	1.9	0.02	1.205
2017	7,410,000	56,548	46,829	9,719	7.7	6.3	1.4	-0.57	1.125
2018	7,451,000	53,716	47,400	6,316	7.2	6.3	0.9	-0.46	1.080
2019	7,507,400	52,856	48,957	3,899	7.0	6.5	0.5	-0.32	1.064
2020	7,481,800	43,031	50,666	−7,635	5.8	6.8	−1.0	-1.54	0.883
2021	7,413,100	36,953	51,354	−14,401	5.0	6.9	−1.9	-0.91	0.772
2022	7,346,100	32,512	62,100	−29,488	4.4	8.4	−4.0	-2.05	0.701
2023	7,498,100	33,288	56,776	−23,488	4.4	7.6	−3.2	0.80	0.751
2024	7,534,200	36,767	52,366	−15,599	4.9	6.8	−1.9	1.05	0.841
2025	7,527,500	31,100	50,000	−18,900	4.1	6.6	-2.5	1.62	0.713

=== Current vital statistics ===
Period	Live births	Deaths	Natural increase
January – August 2025	20,695	34,648	-13,953
January – August 2026	19,086	34,738	-15,652
Difference	▼ -1,609 (-7.77%)	▲ +90 (+0.26%)	▼ -1,699

View source data.

=== Death rates by leading causes of death ===
No. of deaths per 100,000 population by leading causes of death (based on ICD 10th revision). Red: increased compared with 2001.
	Cause of death	2001	2011	2021
1.	Malignant neoplasms	169.9	187.2	203.8
2.	Pneumonia	45.1	87.8	132.6
3.	Diseases of heart	70	89.6	89
4.	Cerebrovascular	46.6	47.2	42.2
5.	External causes of morbidity and mortality	27.5	22.2	26.7
6.	Nephritis, nephrotic syndrome and nephrosis	15.7	21.8	24
7.	Dementia	3.8	10.6	20.2
8.	Septicaemia	6.3	10.8	16.8
9.	Chronic lower respiratory diseases	31.5	27.8	14.3
10.	Diabetes mellitus	10.1	6.5	7.4
	All other causes	69.7	85	118.1
	All causes	496	596.6	695.2

=== Life expectancy ===
Hong Kong is the territory with the world's highest life expectancy according to the United Nations.

Development of life expectancy in Hong Kong since 1986

Period	Life expectancy in years	Period	Life expectancy in years
1950–1955	63.1	1985–1990	77.0
1955–1960	65.9	1990–1995	78.1
1960–1965	68.8	1995–2000	80.0
1965–1970	70.9	2000–2005	81.4
1970–1975	72.5	2005–2010	82.4
1975–1980	73.7	2010–2015	83.4
1980–1985	75.6		

Source: UN World Population Prospects

=== Marriage and fertility ===
According to The World Factbook in 2006, the average marriage age in Hong Kong was 30 years for males and 27 years for females, and the population was subdivided into the following categories:

==== Marital status ====
Married	57.8%	3,423,995
Never married	32%	1,920,522
Divorced	3.2%	189,563
Separated	0.6%	34,722

== Ethnicity ==
According to Hong Kong census data more than 90% of the population are Chinese. The largest minority are Filipino with over 200,000 in 2021, almost doubled since 2006. Other minorities include Indonesians, Indians, Nepalese and Whites.

Census data from 2006, 2011, 2016 and 2021.
Ethnic group	2006 By-census		2011 Census		2016 By-census		2021 Census	
Ethnic group	Number	%	Number	%	Number	%	Number	%
Chinese	6,522,148	95.0%	6,620,393	93.6%	6,752,202	92.0%	6,793,502	91.6%
Filipino	112,453	1.6%	133,018	1.9%	184,081	2.5%	201,291	2.7%
Indonesian	87,840	1.3%	133,377	1.9%	153,299	2.1%	142,065	1.9%
White	36,384	0.5%	55,236	0.8%	58,209	0.8%	61,582	0.8%
Indian	20,444	0.3%	28,616	0.4%	36,462	0.5%	42,569	0.6%
Nepalese	15,950	0.2%	16,518	0.2%	25,472	0.3%	29,701	0.4%
Pakistani	11,111	0.2%	18,042	0.3%	18,094	0.2%	24,385	0.3%
Thai	11,900	0.2%	11,213	0.2%	10,215	0.1%	12,972	0.2%
Japanese	13,189	0.2%	12,580	0.2%	9,976	0.1%	10,291	0.1%
Other Asian	12,663	0.2%	12,247	0.2%	19,589	0.3%	10,574	0.1%
Others	20,264	0.3%	30,336	0.4%	68,986	0.9%	70,124	0.9%
Total	6,864,346		7,071,576		7,336,585		7,413,070	

=== Chinese ===
Ethnic groups in Hong Kong (2021)
Ethnic groups (alone)
Chinese	91.6%
Filipino	2.7%
Indonesian	1.9%
South Asians	1.4%
Other	3%

Historically, the major Chinese groups in Hong Kong include the Cantonese (including Punti and Toishanese), Hakka, Hoklo, and Tanka (mostly Cantonese speakers). The Punti, and Tanka people in Hong Kong are largely descendants of the indigenous population, while the Hakka and Hoklo groups are composed of both indigenous groups and more recent migrants.

Most Teochew-speaking migrants immigrated to Hong Kong between the late 1940s and early 1970s, while migrants from Fujian (previously Southern Min speakers, and increasingly more Central Min and Northern Min speakers) have constituted a growing number of migrants since 1978. Many Yue-speaking people such as Taishanese and Cantonese also migrated after 1949.

According to the 2016 by-census, 92% of the Hong Kong population belongs to a Chinese ethnicity. The Hong Kong census does not currently categorise Han Chinese subgroups nor does it differentiate other Chinese ethnicities, although in the past the census would collect information on language and dialect use. However, the majority of Hongkongers of Chinese descent trace their ancestry to various parts of Southern China: the Guangzhou area, followed by Siyi (Toishanese people), Chaoshan (a region of Eastern Guangdong home to Teochew speakers), Fujian, and Shanghai. Some Cantonese people also originate from Hakka-speaking villages in the New Territories.

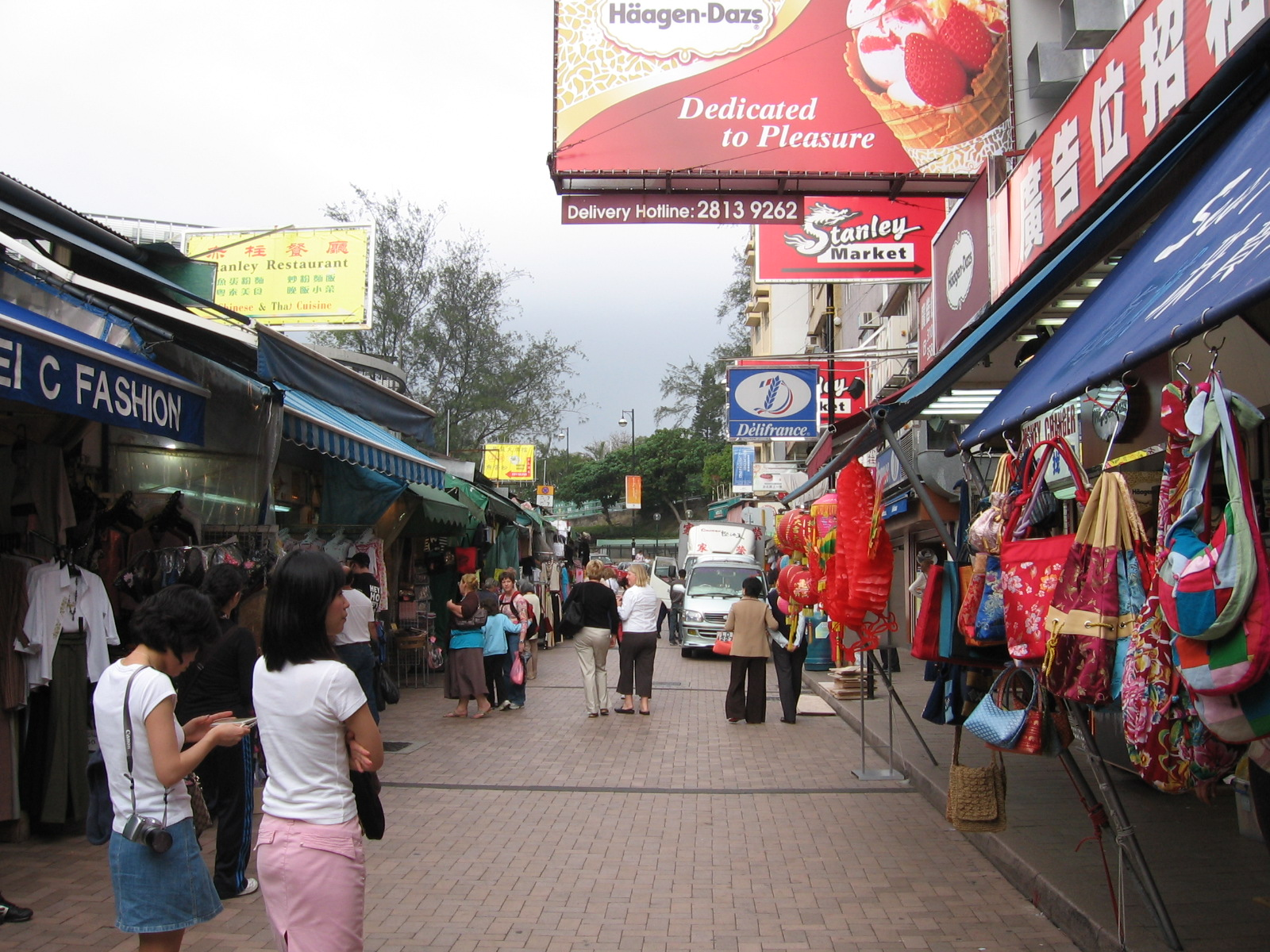
Stanley Market

=== Ethnic minorities ===
8% of the population of Hong Kong are categorised as "ethnic minorities", including a large number of Filipinos and Indonesians, who together make up approximately 4.6% of the population. However, the majority of the Filipinos and Indonesians population are short-termed foreign domestic helpers. After excluding foreign domestic helpers, the number of ethnic minorities was 263,593 in 2016, making up 3.6% of the whole Hong Kong population.

Circa 2018 there were about 2,000 people of African origins with about 800–1,000 in Yuen Long. Chungking Mansions is another area of settlement and employment. Some Africans seeking to asylum travelled to Hong Kong as of June 2020. According to Lingnan University professor Lisa Leung Yuk-ming, African settlement began in the 1990s. The Hong Kong African Association (香港非洲人協會) is an ethnic association for those people.

A Thai community began in Hong Kong when Thai women travelled with their husbands, of Chaozhou (Chiu Chow) origin, to Hong Kong in the 1970s. In 2016, Hong Kong had about 10,215 Thai residents, with around 33% residing in Kowloon City.

== Nationality ==
Due to its history as trading, business, and tourism hub, a large number of expatriates live in Hong Kong, representing 8% of the population. The following lists ethnic groups with significant presence in Hong Kong in alphabetical order by category:

- Africa
- East Asia
  - Japan
  - Korea
- Europe
  - Britain
  - France
  - Russia
- North America
  - United States
  - Canada
- Oceania
  - Australia
- South Asia
  - India
  - Nepal
  - Pakistan
- Southeast Asia
  - The Philippines
  - Indonesia (mainly Javanese)
  - Thailand
  - Vietnam

== Language ==
As a former British colony, Hong Kong has 2 official languages: English, and Chinese, although the specific variety of Chinese is not specified. The majority of the population uses Cantonese as their usual spoken language. However, due to Hong Kong's role as an international trade and finance hub, there are also a wide variety of minority groups speaking dozens of languages present in the territory.

Language usually spoken at home (5+)	1961		1971		1991		1996		2001		2006		2011		2016		2021	
Language usually spoken at home (5+)	Number	%	Number	%	Number	%	Number	%	Number	%	Number	%	Number	%	Number	%	Number	%
Cantonese	2,076,210	79.0	3,469,235	88.1	4,583,322	88.6	5,196,240	88.7	5,726,972	89.2	6,030,960	90.8	6,095,213	89.5	6,264,700	88.9	6,382,947	88.2
Mandarin	26,021	1.0	405,147	10.2	57,577	1.1	65,892	1.1	55,410	0.9	60,859	0.9	94,399	1.4	131,406	1.9	165,541	2.3
Other Chinese languages	348,544	13.3	405,147	10.2	364,694	7.1	340,222	5.8	352,562	5.5	289,027	4.4	273,745	4.0	221,247	3.1	204,571	2.8
English	31,824	1.2	41,119	1.1	114,084	2.2	184,308	3.1	203,598	3.2	187,281	2.8	238,288	3.5	300,417	4.3	330,782	4.6
Other languages	17,911	0.7	21,129	0.6	49,232	1.0	73,879	1.3	79,197	1.2	72,217	1.1	106,788	1.6	131,199	1.9	149,376	2.1
Total	2,628,942		3,936,630		5,168,909		5,860,541		6,417,739		6,640,344		6,808,433		7,048,969		7,179,127	

However, a very large proportion of the population in Hong Kong are able to communicate in multiple languages. The school system is separated into English-medium and Chinese-medium school, both of which teach English and Mandarin.

Proportion of population (5+) able to speak selected languages
	1991	1996	2001	2006	2011	2016	2021
	%	%	%	%	%	%	%
Cantonese	95.8%	95.2%	96.1%	96.5%	95.8%	94.6%	93.7%
English	31.6%	38.1%	43.0%	44.7%	46.1%	53.2%	58.7%
Mandarin	18.1%	25.3%	34.1%	40.2%	47.8%	48.6%	54.2%
Hakka	5.3%	4.9%	5.1%	4.7%	4.7%	4.2%	3.6%
Hokkien	3.6%	3.9%	3.9%	3.4%	3.5%	3.6%	3.1%
Tagalog	1.1%	1.8%	1.9%	1.4%	1.7%	2.7%	2.8%
Chiu Chow	5.4%	5.0%	4.8%	3.9%	3.8%	3.4%	2.8%
Bahasa Indonesia	0.7%	0.9%	1.3%	1.7%	2.4%	2.7%	2.5%
Japanese	1.0%	1.2%	1.4%	1.2%	1.5%	1.8%	2.1%
Shanghainese	1.8%	1.6%	1.5%	1.2%	1.1%	1.1%	0.8%

== Religion ==
Religion in Hong Kong (2024)
1. No religion or not mentioned (48.9%)
2. Buddhism (13.2%)
3. Taoism (13.2%)
4. Protestantism (13.8%)
5. Catholicism (5.20%)
6. Islam (4.00%)
7. Hinduism (1.30%)
8. Sikhism (0.20%)

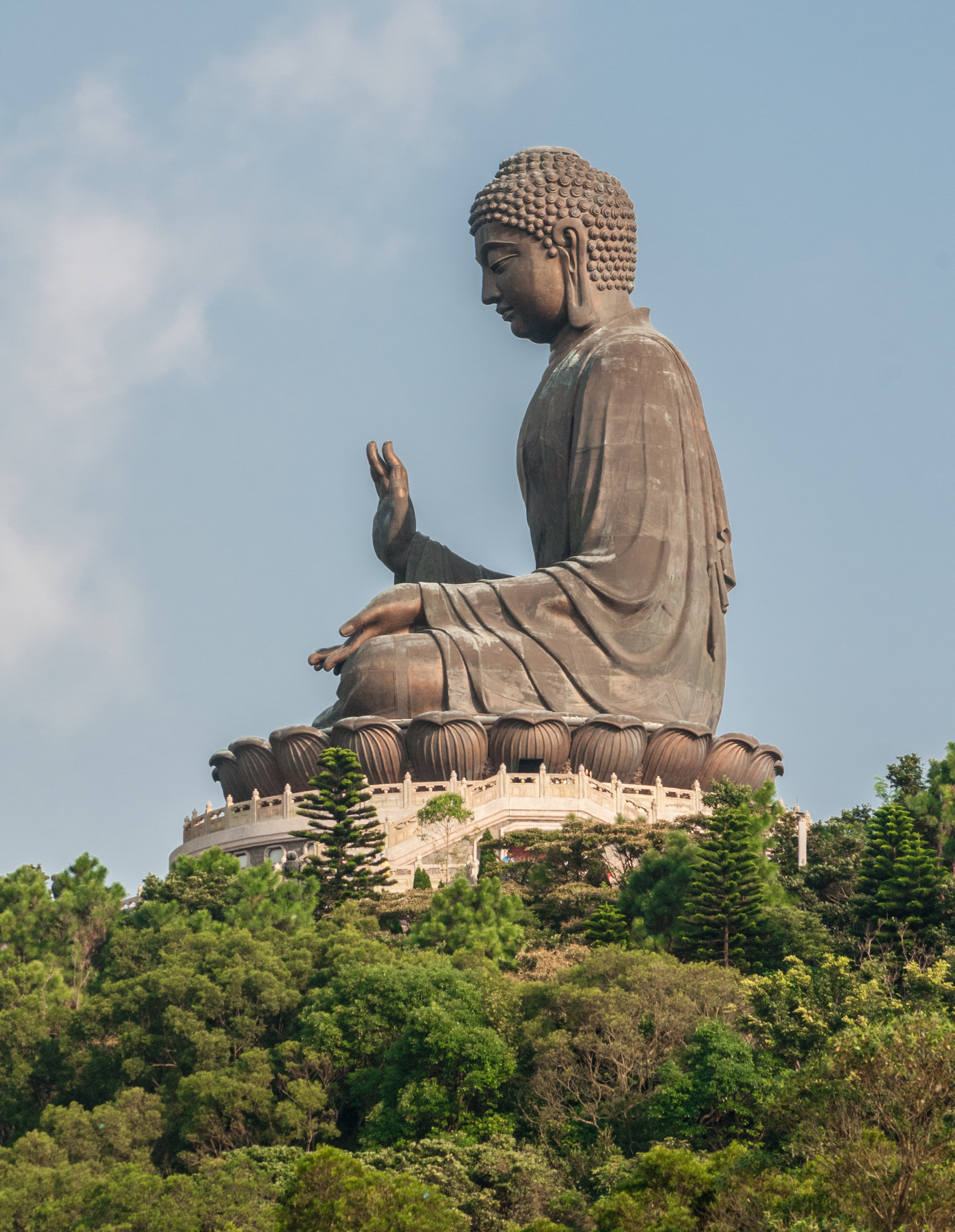
The Tian Tan Buddha on Lantau Island.

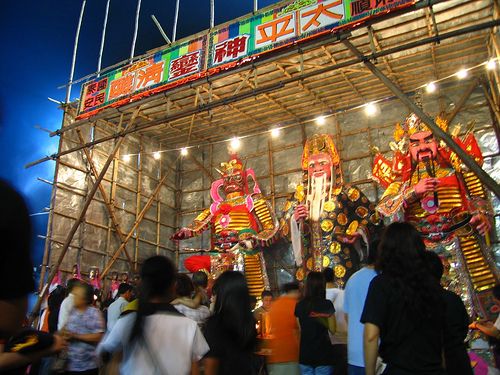
People honouring gods in a dajiao celebration, the Cheung Chau Bun Festival.

Over half of all people (56.1% as of 2010) are not religious. Religious people in Hong Kong follow a diverse range of religions, among which Taoist and Buddhist (specifically Chinese Buddhism) faiths are common for people of Chinese descent.

Confucian beliefs are popular in Hong Kong, but it is arguable whether Confucianism can be considered as a religion. Accordingly, Confucianism is excluded in some studies.

The Christian beliefs of Protestantism (with 1,040,000 members) and Catholicism (390,000 members) are also common, as well as non-organised Chinese folk religions, whose followers may state that they are not religious.

Traditional religions including Chinese Buddhism were discouraged under British rule, which officially represented Christianity. The handover of sovereignty from Britain to China has led to a resurgence of Buddhist and Chinese religions.

Estimated number of adherents in Hong Kong by religion
Religion	2008	2009	2010	2011	2012	2013	2016	2021	2024
Buddhists	> 1 million	> 1 million	> 1 million	> 1 million	> 1 million	> 1 million	> 1 million	> 1 million	> 1 million
Taoists	≈ 1 million	≈ 1 million	≈ 1 million	≈ 1 million	> 1 million	> 1 million	> 1 million	> 1 million	> 1 million
Protestant	320,000	320,000	480,000	480,000	480,000	≈ 500,000	500,000	900,000	1,040,000
Catholics	350,000	350,000	353,000	363,000	363,000	368,000	384,000	401,000	390,000
Muslims	220,000	220,000	220,000	220,000	270,000	300,000	300,000	300,000	300,000
Hindu	40,000	40,000	40,000	40,000	40,000	40,000	100,000	100,000	100,000
Sikhs	10,000	10,000	10,000	10,000	10,000	10,000	12,000	12,000	15,000

== See also ==
- Hong Kong drifter
- Hong Kong Kids phenomenon
- Hong Kongers
- Hong Kongers in the United Kingdom
- Indigenous inhabitants of the New Territories
- Right of abode in Hong Kong
- Emigration from Hong Kong
