= Qoser =

Qoser could refer to:

- Kızıltepe, a municipality in Mardin Province, Turkey
- Nabela Qoser, Hong Kong journalist
