= Nabela Qoser =

Hong Kong journalist (born 1986)

- Chinese: 利君雅
Transcriptions
Standard Mandarin
- Hanyu Pinyin: Lì Jūnyǎ
Yue: Cantonese
- Jyutping: lei6 gwan1 ngaa5

Nabela Qoser
- Born: July 6, 1986 (age 39); British Hong Kong
- Education: Hong Kong Baptist University
- Occupation: Journalist
- Years active: 2008 ~ present
- Organization: Society for Cultural Integration
- Known for: News anchor
- Notable work: This Week, RTHK
- Awards: Hong Kong Human Rights Press Award

Nabela Qoser (Chinese: 利君雅; born 6 July 1986) is a Hong Kong journalist and broadcaster. Until end of May 2021, she was Assistant Programme Officer at Radio Television Hong Kong (RTHK) and co-hosted the RTHK talk show. She attracted media attention in 2019 following her outspoken questioning of government officials.

== Biography ==
Qoser was born in Hong Kong to Pakistani immigrant parents. She attributed her fluency in Cantonese to her education in mainstream schools and watching Cantonese-language television programmes daily. She achieved a grade of A in Chinese Language in the Hong Kong Certificate of Education Examination (HKCEE), and graduated from the Hong Kong Baptist University's Department of Broadcast Journalism in 2008.

As of 2010, Qoser is a member of the Society for Cultural Integration, an organisation which advocates for multiculturalism in Hong Kong.

== Career ==
Following graduation, Qoser joined Now TV as a news reporter. She became Hong Kong's first Chinese-language news reporter of non-ethnic Chinese descent. After having worked at Cable TV, in 2011 Qoser joined TVB News as a reporter, sometimes presenting News at 6:30. She left TVB in 2015 and joined Ming Pao as a journalist.

=== RTHK ===
Qoser joined RTHK as Assistant Programme Officer on 3 October 2017. As of September 2020, she hosts the current affairs talk show This Week on RTHK TV 31.

Qoser attracted media attention following her questioning of government officials over the 2019 Yuen Long attack. Chief Executive Carrie Lam and several government officials organised a press conference on 22 July 2020, more than ten hours after the mob attack, to respond to media enquiries. During the press conference, Qoser confronted Lam and Commissioner of Police Stephen Lo over the government's delayed response to the attack. She compared the late government press conference to the one held at 4 am soon after the storming of the Legislative Council Complex on 1 July. She further pressed the government on whether the attack was an act of cooperation between the government, the police, and triad groups. When Lam refused to respond directly, Qoser told her to "answer like a human being" (Chinese: 講人話); Qoser also questioned government officials whether they were able to sleep well at night following the attack. Her sharp questioning of government officials was praised in the media and on Internet forums, with netizens calling her a "reporter with conscience" (Chinese: 良心記者).

During the police press conference on 6 August 2019, Qoser asked police officers why they did not immediately arrest the mob attackers on 21 July, unlike their swift arrests on more recent days. She followed up with questions regarding the police's lack of warning to the public, and on CCTV footage that showed police presence that night; she persisted when the police spokesman answered her question indirectly. She was rumoured to have been banned from participating in police press conferences due to her being too direct in her questions, though the RTHK Programme Staff Union clarified that she did not receive pressure from RTHK or the police force. During a police press conference regarding the death of Chow Tsz-lok in November 2019, she repeatedly asked the police on their potential involvement of Chow's death. When officers attempted to proceed to the next question, other journalists participating in the conference passed their turn, effectively handing back the floor back to Qoser.

In January 2020, Qoser interviewed pro-Beijing politician Junius Ho on an episode of This Week. The episode, which Qoser hosted, originally involved a debate between Ho and actor Anthony Wong, though Wong quit last-minute due to an accident and the death of his father-in-law; in response, Qoser interviewed Ho directly. The combative interview involved discussion over the Yuen Long attack. Ho insisted that the attack was triggered by Lam Cheuk-ting bringing people to Yuen Long to provoke locals. Qoser rebuked Ho by pointing out that the first attack in Yuen Long that night occurred at 9:50 pm, before Lam's first appearance inside Yuen Long station at 10:50 pm. Following the interview, some followers of pro-Ho group "Silent Majority" directed racially charged comments at Qoser.

In September 2020, RTHK informed Qoser that they would "reopen" their investigation into complaints regarding Qoser received between July and November 2019, including her performance during government press conferences, and asked to extend her probation period for another 120 days. Previously, her probation period would have lasted three years and would have ended in October 2020. Her colleagues, who entered the same time as she did, were able to complete the probation period successfully. The RTHK Program Staff Union strongly opposed the extension to Qoser's probation period, considering it to be "very unfair" and "unjustified suppression". Union leader Gladys Chiu said Qoser had completed six reviews within her probation period, where any issues with her professional work would have been raised already. According to information obtained by Ming Pao, the decision was made following pressure from executive organs external to RTHK.

On 21 January 2021, as the investigations into the complaints continued, Qoser's civil service contract was terminated, and replaced with merely a 120-day contract. According to the RTHK Programme Staff Union, this was verbally stated by management to be again a civil service contract, but would not allow her to carry over previous years of service or MPF contributions. Union leader Chiu condemned the handling of the case as "unprecedented, arbitrary and non-transparent", and described the decision as amounting to a "termination of employment, in fact". On 28 January, over 50 RTHK staff members joined a silent protest, organized by the Staff Union, in support of Qoser.

At the end of April 2021, Qoser was informed that her 120-day contract would not be renewed at its expiry on 30 May, ending her RTHK career. Since 3 May, RTHK under the new management began to remove the censored program archives in YouTube such as Headliner, Hong Kong Connection and This Week.

On 6 May 2021, her crew of This Week won the 25th Hong Kong Human Rights Press Awards panelled by Amnesty International Hong Kong, the Hong Kong Journalists Association, and the Foreign Correspondents' Club, Hong Kong with two submissions "In the Name of Justice" and "Awakened, amid the Epidemic?", while another team of Hong Kong Connection also won the Documentary Video award with the emission "7.21 Who Owns the Truth?". After failing to withdraw from the nominations beforehand, RTHK declared to reject the awards.

=== Online harassment ===
For her reporting style, Qoser had been subject of attacks by the pro-Beijing camp since the start of the 2019 protests. Abusive comments about Qoser, targeting her skin colour and ethnicity, appeared on pro-Beijing social media pages. On 21 January 2020, the Equal Opportunities Commission issued a statement, which expressed "grave concern" over the social media comments and reiterated the commission's stance against verbal abuse. The statement, which did not directly mention Qoser by name, made reference to the Race Discrimination Ordinance (Cap. 602), which prohibits discrimination and harassment based on a person's race.
