= Hinduism in Hong Kong =

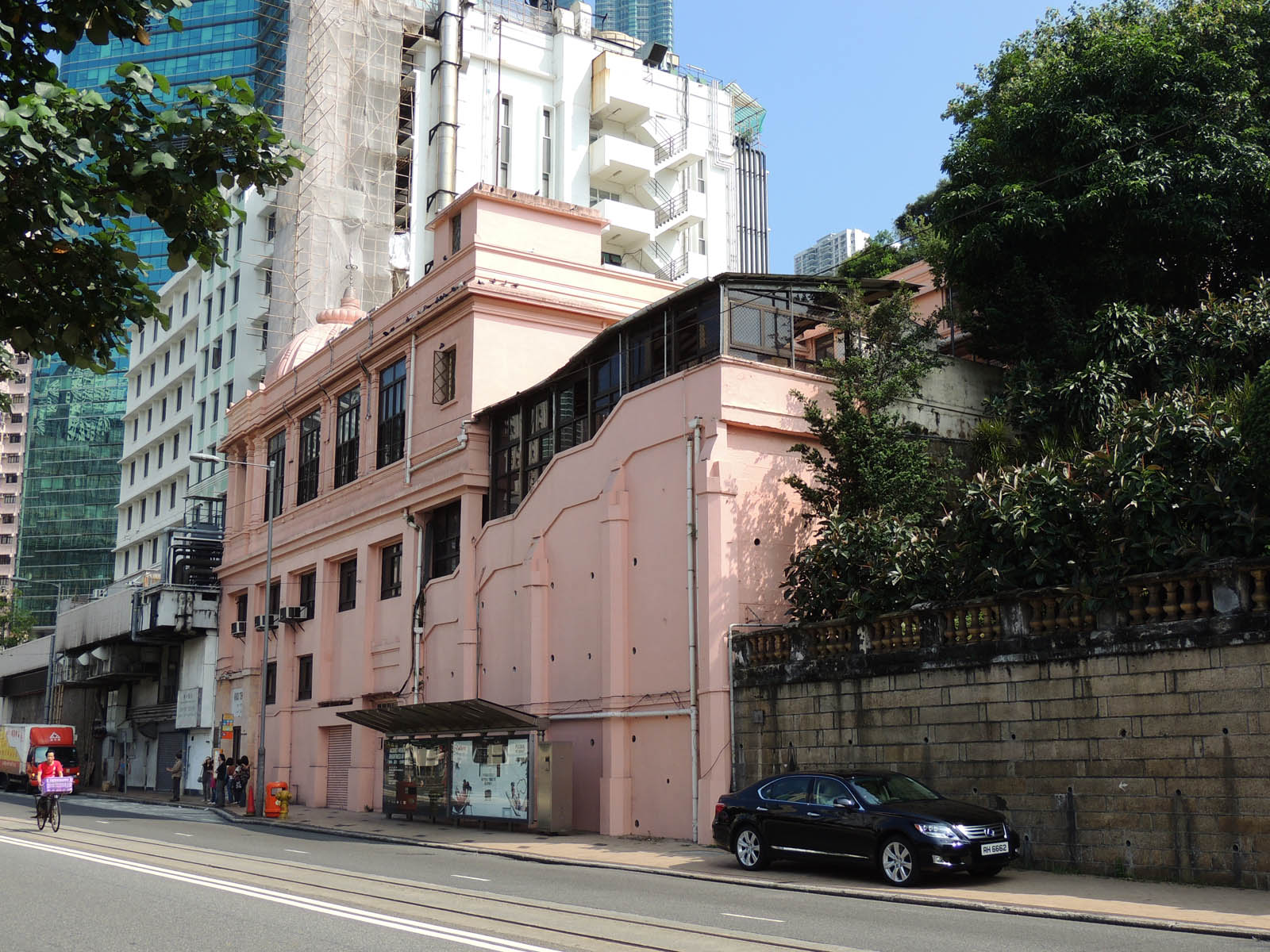
Hindu temple in Hong Kong

Hinduism is a minority religion in Hong Kong, and it is growing along with the city's South Asian population. It is practised by descendants of migrants from the Indian subcontinent who are mainly businesspeople. Hinduism made up 0.5% of Hong Kong's population in 2010, or about 40,000 people. By 2016, the Hindu population had risen to 100,000 or 1.3% of the total.

Year	Percent	Population
2007	0.6%	40,000
2010	0.6%	40,000
2016	1.3%	100,000

== Contemporary Society ==
Hindu holidays of Holi is celebrated by Hindus as well as non-Hindus, for example, Diwali at Tsim Sha Tsui, where many South Asians in Hong Kong lived and worked in. Many Indian restaurants, particularly the vegetarian ones, are owned by Hindus. There is a crematorium in Cape Collinson. The International Society for Krishna Consciousness has a centre in Hong Kong established in 1981.

== Notable Establishments ==
=== Happy Valley Temple ===
This temple serves as the central hub for around 100,000 Hindus in Hong Kong. It performs traditional poojas, weddings and other religious ceremonies, and it acts as a gatekeeper to the Commonwealth War Memorial and operates a crematorium in Cape Collinson. The temple is managed by the Hindu Association of Hong Kong.

Located on the hillside behind the Hindu Temple at 1B Wong Nei Chong Road (opposite side from the Happy Valley Racecourse) there exists a Commonwealth War Graves Commission (CWGC) memorial to 8 Hindu and Sikh soldiers whose mortal remains were cremated at the cremation ground behind the Hindu temple. A large white granite obelisk bearing the names of eight Indian soldiers who served in Hong Kong to assist with colonial defence of the Hong Kong garrison during the First World War. As with Commonwealth War Graves Commissions (CWGC) memorials all over the world, the military memorial is open to the general public and access is through the staircase at the rear of the Hindu Temple.

== See also ==
- South Asians in Hong Kong
- Battle of Hong Kong
