= News Roundup (Hong Kong TV program) =

- 晚間新聞
- Genre: News
- Created by: TVB News
- Presented by: Weeknights: TVB News journalists Weekends: TVB News journalists
- Country of origin: Hong Kong
- Original language: Cantonese

Production
- Producer: TVB News
- Production location: Hong Kong
- Running time: 30 minutes

Original release
- Network: TVB Jade
- Release: 19 November 1967 – present

Related
- News at Six-Thirty

News Roundup (Chinese: 晚間新聞) is the flagship news programme for Hong Kong television channel TVB Jade. It airs from 11:00 to 11:30 pm on weeknights and 11:30 to 11:45 pm on weekends.

As of June 2017, News Roundup was the most watched daily news programme in Hong Kong, with average 0.7 million (11%) viewers each night.

== History ==
News Roundup was originally launched as Late News (最後新聞) at 11:30 pm on 17 November 1967. The programme was moved to 11:30 pm in the 1990s.

On 2 February 2009, the weeknight versions of News Roundup moved to 11:00 pm on TVB Jade, TVBN and TVB iNews as the flagship newscast of TVB News. Akina Fong became the first permanent presenter of the newscast. News Roundup also begins airing in high definition since 2 February 2009. Fong's final broadcast was aired on 24 February 2012, Kenneth Ng succeeded her after the 2012 Chief Executive election.

News Roundup was extended to a one-hour newscast for TVB Jade on 5 January 2015. However, the length of the broadcast returned to 30 minutes on 11 July 2016.

== English Version ==
The English version of News Roundup airs after the Studio 930.
