= South Asians in Hong Kong =

Ethnic group

South Asians in Hong Kong 南亞人
Total population
- At least 101,969 (1.4% of the population) (2021)

Regions with significant populations
- Hong Kong Island, Kowloon and South New Territories

Languages
- English and Cantonese; also Hindi–Urdu, Tamil, Malayalam, Kannada, Telugu, Sindhi, Gujarati, Punjabi, Nepali

Religion
- Hinduism, Buddhism, Islam, Sikhism, Jainism, Zoroastrianism, Baháʼí Faith, Christianity

Related ethnic groups
- Overseas Pakistani, Non-resident Indian and person of Indian origin, Non Resident Nepali
- The numbers of Bangladeshis and Sri Lankans were not individually broken out in the 2006 By-Census Thematic Report on Ethnic Minorities, from which the above statistics originate. The total population of "Other Asians", which may include members of those two groups, was 7,851.

South Asians in Hong Kong form a significant part of the city's society. According to the 2021 by-census, there were at least 101,969 people of South Asian descent living in the city. Many have traced their roots in Hong Kong for over a century, dating back to the period when both Hong Kong and the Indian subcontinent were under British colonial rule. Their presence is also a legacy of the British Empire, and issues around nationality and citizenship remain complex for many.

Some South Asians in Hong Kong continue to hold Indian citizenship, while others have acquired Chinese nationality and hold a HKSAR passport, usually after obtaining permanent residency. Despite differences in nationality, a large majority speak Cantonese fluently, integrating linguistically into Hong Kong society while maintaining distinct cultural identities.

== Nationality and right of abode ==
South Asians in Hong Kong include citizens of India, Pakistan, Bangladesh, and a small number of stateless persons and naturalised citizens of the People's Republic of China. As a result, many of them also become British National (Overseas) or British citizens.

=== British nationality ===
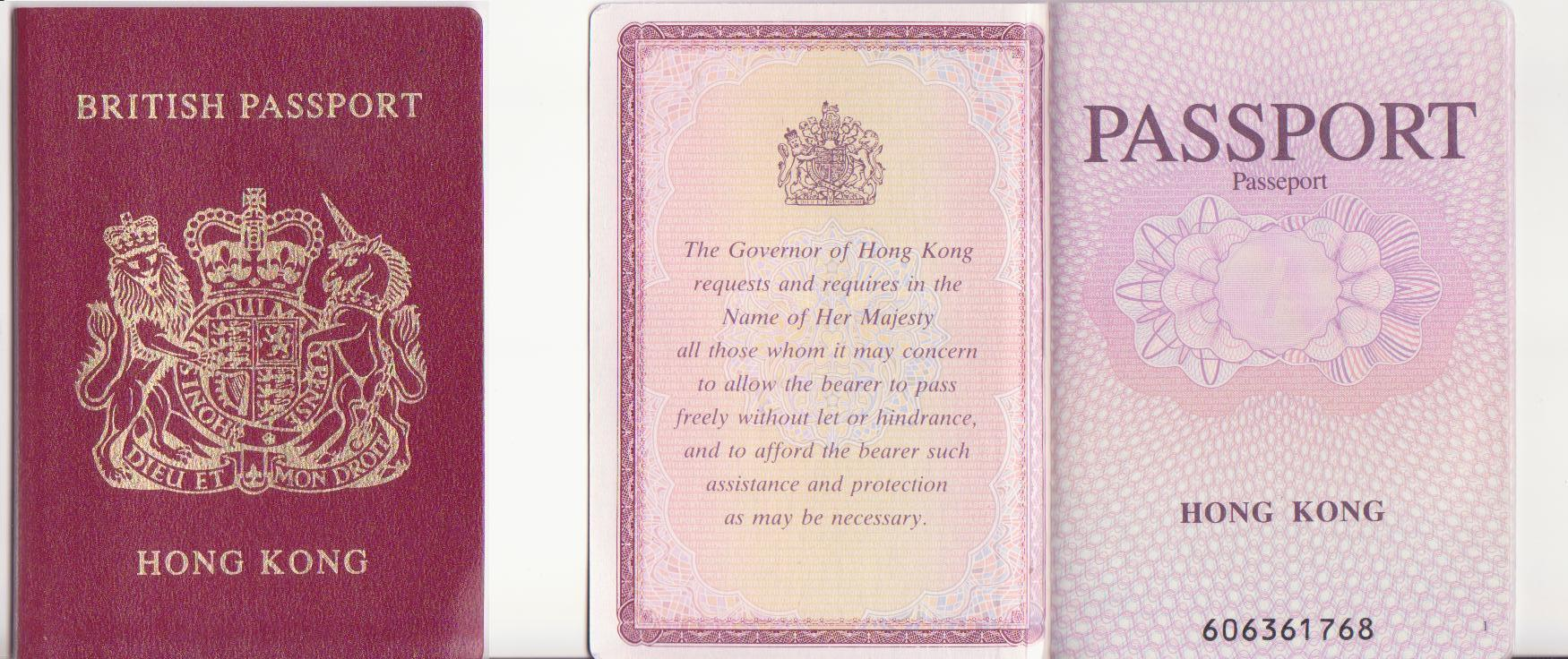
Many people of Indian origin once held British passports like this, issued to British Dependent Territories Citizens

According to the statistics of the Republic of India's High Level Committee on Indian Diaspora, among Hong Kong residents there are 22,000 Indian citizens and 28,500 non-citizen Persons of Indian Origin (people with origins in British India, including places which lie outside today's Republic of India, and having citizenships of countries other than the Republic of India. Note that this number may include people who consider themselves as Pakistanis, Nepalis, or other South Asian nationalities). The citizenship of Hong Kong residents of Indian descent who lacked Republic of India citizenship was a major point of contention in the years leading up to the handover. Many Indians had settled in Hong Kong, taking it as their only home and naturalising as Citizens of the United Kingdom and Colonies (CUKCs). This status initially made no distinctions between residents of the United Kingdom and elsewhere, but from the 1960s onwards a number of nationality acts successively scraped away the privileges it offered, creating a class of CUKCs who had no right of abode in the United Kingdom itself. Eventually in 1981, these restrictions were codified in a new class of British citizenship, the British Dependent Territories Citizenship (BDTC). Furthermore, as this status would cease to be effective after the 1997 handover, the British government created the new status of British National, a restricted form of British nationality which also did not grant right of abode in the United Kingdom. By 1985, out of about 14,000 Indians settled in Hong Kong, 6,000 were BDTCs.

Unlike the majority people of Chinese descent, who were seen by the incoming Chinese administration as always having been Chinese citizens, the ethnic minorities, including South Asians, would be left only with BN(O) status, which amounted to effective statelessness due to the lack of guarantee of returnability to the United Kingdom or anywhere else and the lack of ability to pass the status on to descendants beyond one generation. With their citizenship in limbo, by the 1990s many Indians in Hong Kong reportedly would not even marry among themselves, preferring to look overseas for potential spouses with foreign passports. Some rich South Asians were granted full British citizenship under the British Nationality Selection Scheme, but the Home Office opposed a blanket grant for fears of the precedent it might set. Younger Indians formed lobbying groups such as the Indian Resources Group to press their case with the British government. They emphasised that their members had not applied for emigration to other countries such as Canada or the United States, and would be unlikely to settle in Britain were they granted citizenship; instead, they intended to remain in Hong Kong and believed that British citizenship would facilitate this aim.

In the end, the British government formally agreed to grant citizenship to any BN(O), BDTC, or other British subject who had no other citizenship on 4 February 1997. Thus, most stateless people of Indian origin were able to obtain British citizen passports. However, confusion over the interaction of British and Indian nationality laws effectively rendered this promise useless in roughly 200 cases, all minors who had acquired Indian citizenship at birth and later became BN(O)s by registration. Indian nationality law provides that any Indian citizen acquiring foreign citizenship by naturalisation or registration loses his citizenship of India; only Indians who acquired foreign citizenship by reason of birth could hold dual citizenship. The Indian government stated that people who had acquired BN(O) status by birth remained Indian citizens until age 18. However, BN(O) status is not acquired by birth, meaning that every single Indian adult or minor who registered as a BN(O) lost his Indian citizenship. Notwithstanding that, the British Home Office used the Indian government's statement as a basis for denying full British citizenship to people who were minors on 4 February 1997; the Home Office misunderstood India's dual citizenship provisions to mean that they were still entitled to Indian citizenship on that date, when in fact they were not. More than a decade after the handover, they have not naturalised as Chinese citizens; instead, they continue to hold only BN(O) passports in hopes of being able to attain the full British citizenship that was promised to them.

=== Chinese nationality ===
Naturalisation approval rates of different groups, July 1997 − November 2012
Nationality	Applications	Approvals	Approval rate
Total	15,518	12,658	81.6%
Pakistani	4,536	3,411	75.2%
Indian	3,224	2,487	77.1%
Vietnamese	1,593	1,115	70.0%
Filipino	570	387	67.9%
Others	5,595	5,258	94.0%

A small proportion of Indians have availed themselves of naturalisation as Chinese citizens, which according to law can be requested by any Hong Kong permanent resident who has Chinese relatives, who has settled there, or who has other legitimate reasons, and who is willing to renounce all foreign citizenships.

The Nationality Law of the People's Republic of China began to apply in the HKSAR when it was established on 1 July 1997 in accord with Hong Kong Basic Law Article 18 and Annex III, with some differences from the application of the same law in mainland China, due to explanations of the Standing Committee of the National People's Congress. That put the Immigration Department in charge of administering the Nationality Law within the SAR.

Although China did not agree to a blanket grant of citizenship to South Asians settled in Hong Kong, it empowered the Hong Kong Immigration Department to naturalise Hong Kong residents as Chinese citizens. Prior to 2002, the Hong Kong Immigration Department discouraged South Asians and other ethnic minorities from taking this course, with immigration officers reportedly refusing to even give them the forms to fill in (thus they would not show up in rejection statistics). It took until December 2002 to see the first case of successful naturalisation application by an ethnic minority resident with no Chinese relatives, an Indian girl, followed by a Pakistani man.

Other high-profile South Asians such as aspiring politician Abdull Ghafar Khan and the wife of Gill Mohindepaul Singh have continued to experience rejections of their naturalisation applications as well, leading to an August 2012 letter of concern from then-Equal Opportunities Commissioner Eden Lam to the Immigration Department. Several affected South Asian residents contacted their legislators seeking relief, leading to a Legislative Council question later that year by Claudia Mo of the Civic Party to Secretary for Security Lai Tung-kwok. Lai's response revealed that from July 1997 to November 2012, Pakistanis and Indians formed more than half of the applicants for naturalisation and had an approval rate higher than Vietnamese or Filipinos, but far lower than the applicant pool excluding those four groups.

Immigration Department statistics provided to the Legislative Council at various times show that from July 1997 to April 2005, only 552 Indian citizens applied for naturalisation as Chinese citizens, while from May 2005 to November 2012, nearly five times as many (2,672) applied. In total, among the 3,224 Indians who applied for naturalisation from July 1997 to November 2012, 2,487 (77.1%) had their applications accepted. Persons of Indian origin who are citizens of China, or any of whose ancestors were ever citizens of China, are not eligible to obtain a Persons of Indian Origin Card.

Those who are born in Hong Kong to stateless parents are entitled to Chinese nationality at birth under Article 6 of the Chinese nationality law.

== Languages ==
The South Asians of Hong Kong are usually multilingual, with many attaining trilingual fluency or more. Most are fluent in both English and a mother tongue (such as Sindhi, Tamil, Gujarati, or Punjabi) and many are fluent in Hindi–Urdu as well. In addition, some may also study Sanskrit, Arabic, or Avestan for religious reasons. The command of Cantonese is more variable; one 2006 survey of South Asian parents with children attending school in Hong Kong showed that more than 80% were illiterate in Chinese, while 60% could not speak Cantonese at all.

Among respondents to the 2011 Census who self-identified as Indian, 37.2% stated that they spoke English as their usual language, 4.6% Cantonese, and 57.9% some other language. With regards to additional spoken languages other than their usual language, 52.0% stated that they spoke English, 30.7% Cantonese, and 7.0% Mandarin. (Multiple responses were permitted to the latter question, hence the responses are non-exclusive.) 10.8% did not speak English as either their usual language nor an additional language, while the respective figures for Cantonese and Mandarin were 64.7% and 93.0%.

== Occupational history ==
Some famous Indians are Hormusjee Naorojee Mody, Dorabjee Naorojee Mithaiwala, Hari Harilela and Jehangir Hormusjee Ruttonjee who arrived independently in the course of trade from Bombay, Gujarat and Karachi (Sindh).

In the pre-war period, most of the Indians took part in the army. Before the Second World War, nearly 60% of the police force were Sikhs. Also, some Indians have established businesses in Hong Kong. The Harilela family runs one of the best-known business groups.

After the war, the number of Indians taking up positions at government sections had declined as most of the Indians were no longer citizens of the British colony after India gained independence in 1947. A large number of Sikh policemen left Hong Kong and about 150 Punjabi Muslim and Pathan worked in the police force in 1952. Meanwhile, other Indian communities such as Marwaris and Tamil Muslims came to Hong Kong for trading.

More Indians stepped into the fields like international companies, banking, airlines, travel agents, medical, media and insurance sector. The banking and financial sector had the strongest presence of Indian professionals. Information technology and telecommunications have also interested highly qualified Indians. In the 1950s, tailoring had become an industry that was popular with Indians and around 200 tailoring shops were owned by them at that time.

After 2005, there have been a growing number of diamond merchants from Gujarat who have settled in Hong Kong. Since 2019, Hong Kong banks have closed many business accounts of Gujarati diamond merchants due to fraud and money laundering. It has now become difficult for new diamonds merchants to open business bank accounts. One high-profile example includes Nirav Modi. Nirav Modi group's exposure was not limited to only Punjab National Bank's Brady House branch in Mumbai, as the firms had availed loans from its Hong Kong and Dubai branches too, according to an internal report of the bank submitted to investigative agencies. As per the report, Nirav Modi group's companies Firestar Diamond Ltd Hong Kong and Firestar Diamond FZE Dubai had availed some credit facilities from the Hong Kong and Dubai branches of Punjab National Bank (PNB) as well. Hong Kong banks have been closely monitoring their diamonds business accounts after these cases.

=== Life in Hong Kong ===
South Asians are scattered and live and work in different areas of Hong Kong. According to the 2021 Census, 40.1% lived in Kowloon, 43.2% in New Territories, and 16.7% on Hong Kong Island.

Many South Asians of Indian origin have formed sports and cultural clubs around the subcultures from which they originate in India. The Consulate General of India in Hong Kong maintains a webpage with a list of these Indian Community Associations in Hong Kong.

== Diversity of work ==
For most South Asians in Hong Kong, occupations vary according to their education level and family status. The majority of them are managers, administrative officers, and specialists in technological fields like engineers.

Positions	Indians	Pakistanis	Nepalese	Working force of HK
Managers and Administrative officers	31.2%	9.2%	1.1%	10.7%
Professionals/ assistant professionals	22.3%	6.9%	4.3%	20.9%
Clerk, tertiary industry	18.1%	14.2%	20.7%	31.3%
Craftsmanship / Machine control related	4.9%	24.4%	29.2%	17.2%
Non technological fields	23.2%	45.2%	44.6%	19.5%

(Source: “香港南亞裔概況”, the Census and Statistics Department, 2001)

The percentage of Indians earning less than $4,000 per month or more than $30,000 per month is higher than that in the total working force of Hong Kong, or other South Asian nationalities. This reveals a bimodal income distribution.

Salary range	Indians	Pakistanis	Nepalese	Working force of HK
<4000	11.9%	2.9%	7.3%	10.4%
4,000-9,000	24.7%	51.4%	41.1%	32.8%
10,000-14,999	15.6%	27.8%	37.1%	23%
15,000-19,999	9.8%	6.4%	11%	11.5%
20,000-24,999	8.2%	4.5%	2.2%	7.8%
25,000-29,999	4.2%	1.3%	0.8%	3.4%
≧30,000	25.6%	5.8%	0.6%	11.1%

(Source: “香港南亞裔概況”, the Census and Statistics Department, 2001)

== Labour legislation in Hong Kong ==
The Employment Agencies Administration of the Labour Department is responsible for administering Part XII of the Employment Ordinance and the Employment Agency Regulations. They co-operate with some Individual Consulate Generals in Hong Kong to process contracts for workers while the absence of the participation of India may make it more difficult for the Indians to get a job in Hong Kong through the institutions.

Local Indians have integrated well in Hong Kong. They are not only physically rooted in Hong Kong, but also a part of Hong Kong society. They engage in talk shows, dramas, art exhibitions or TV programs. Also, there is a group of Sikhs who set up the Sahib Sri Guru Gobind Singh Ji Educational Trust for the local Indians.

== History ==
Historic links between the India and Hong Kong can be traced back to the founding days of British Hong Kong.

Sikhs soldiers participated at the flag raising ceremony at Possession Point, Hong Kong in 1841 when the Captain Elliot declared Hong Kong a British possession. Sikhs, Parsis and other South Asians made many contributions to the well-being of Hong Kong. The earliest policemen in Hong Kong were Indians (Sikhs) and the present police force still have some few South Asians, as well as Europeans. The top Hong Kong civil servant was once an Indian, Harnam Singh Grewal (a Sikh), whose family history in Hong Kong dates back to the late 1800s, was the Secretary for Transport and the Secretary for Civil Service in the 1980s.

Many of Hong Kong's century old institutions have been founded with considerable South Asian participation, as the following examples suggest. The University of Hong Kong was founded on funds partially provided by an Indian, Sir H.N. Mody, a close friend of the then governor. The 100-year-old Star Ferry was founded by Dorabji Naorojee. South Asians also founded the Ruttonjee Hospital, Emmanuel Belilos (a Baghdadi Jew) was one of the founders of The Hongkong and Shanghai Banking Corporation, while Sir Lawrence Kadoorie owned the China Light and Power Company. Hari Harilela (a Sindhi) owned the Holiday Inn Golden Mile, while the Chellaram family is in the shipping industry.

=== Early history ===
Indian traders and the British East India Company had already commenced commercial activities in Macau (1654) and Canton (1771) long before Hong Kong became a British colony in 1841. At the time when the Union Jack flag was hoisted in January 1841 there were around 2,700 soldiers and 4 merchants from the Indian subcontinent. Indian troops and traders played an important role in the early development of Hong Kong. In the early years of British Hong Kong, the Indian gold mohur and the rupee were legal tender. Hong Kong and Shanghai Banking Corporation (HSBC) was created in 1864 with 2 Parsees and 1 Indian Jew among the 13 founding committee members. In 1877, 43.24% of goods imported into Hong Kong were from India and 17.62% of exports from Hong Kong went to India. By 1913, trade with India had effectively collapsed with Hong Kong importing just 13.78% from India while exports from Hong Kong were reduced to 2.30%. Indian businessmen were engaged in society building in Hong Kong through significant philanthropic contributions: Hormusjee Nowrojee Mody figured prominently in the founding of University of Hong Kong (HKU). Star Ferry was founded by Abdoolally Ebrahim in 1842 and developed by Dorabjee Naorojee from 1888. Staff for the engineering services of the Kowloon–Canton Railway were recruited from India. Prior to World War II, 60% of the police force were Sikhs from Punjab. In 1949, Jehangir Hormusjee Ruttonjee founded Ruttonjee Sanatorium. Large number of Indians served in the military, police and prison services of British Hong Kong till India gained independence from Britain on 15 August 1947. In 1952 business leaders of the Indian community founded the Indian Chamber of Commerce Hong Kong (ICCHK). It aims to promote and improve the image of Indian trade in Hong Kong and Southern China. As early as 1955, India was asked by Governor Alexander Grantham to weigh-in on China as to the well-being of Hong Kong residents when the colony would revert to China.

=== Indian Army in Hong Kong ===
Soldiers of the East-India Company, British Raj and Princely States in the Indian subcontinent were crucial in securing and defending Hong Kong as a crown colony for Britain. Examples of troops from the Indian sub-continent include the 1st Travancore Nair Infantry, 59th Madras Native Infantry, 26th Bengal Native Infantry, 5th Light Infantry, 40th Pathans, 6th Rajputana Rifles, 11th Rajputs, 10th Jats, 72nd Punjabis, 12th Madras Native Infantry, 38th Madras Native Infantry, Indian Medical Service, Indian Hospital Corps, Royal Indian Army Service Corps, etc. Large contingents of troops from India were garrisoned in Hong Kong right from the start of British Hong Kong and until after World War II. Contributions by the Indian military services in Hong Kong suffer from the physical decay of battle-sites, destruction of documentary archives and sources of information, questionable historiography, conveniently lopsided narratives, unchallenged confabulation of urban myths and incomplete research within academic circles in Hong Kong, Britain and India. Despite high casualties among troops from the British Raj during the Battle of Hong Kong, their contributions are either minimised or ignored. One exception to this is an article by Chandar S. Sundaram, which details the December 1940 mutiny of Sikh gunners of the Hong Kong and Singapore Royal Artillery (HKSRA). This mutiny was caused by Major-General A.E. Grassett, the officer Commanding British Forces in China ordering all troops under his command to carry and possibly wear steel helmets. At this, Sikhs, whose martial identity was predicated on unshorn hair tied up in a turban, mutinied peacefully. Although the tense situation was defused, anti-British disaffection was found to be present amongst Sikh policemen in Hong Kong. Two of the Sikh "troublemakers" rounded-up by the authorities escaped. Making their way to Japanese-occupied Canton, they asked for transport to Bangkok, where they could join their colleagues in the Indian Independent League, an organization, mainly of expatriate Sikhs, who were dedicated to the expulsion of the British from India, by violent means if need be. This connection eventually led to the formation of the Japanese-sponsored Indian National Army. The use of generic words such as "Allied", "British", "Commonwealth" fails to highlight that a significant number of soldiers who defended Hong Kong were from India. Commonwealth War Graves Commission (CWGC) Sai Wan War Cemetery references the graves of Indian troops as "Commonwealth" soldiers. War office records about the Battle of Hong Kong are yet to be fully released online. Transcripts of proceedings from war tribunals held in Hong Kong from 1946 to 1948 by British Military Courts remain mostly confined to archives and specialised museums.

==== Hong Kong Happy Valley Hindu and Sikh Cremation Memorial ====
Located on the hillside behind the Hindu Temple at 1B Wong Nei Chong Road (opposite side from the Happy Valley Racecourse) there exists a Commonwealth War Graves Commission (CWGC) memorial to 8 Hindu and Sikh soldiers whose mortal remains were cremated at the cremation ground behind the Hindu temple. A large white granite obelisk bearing the names of eight Indian soldiers who served in Hong Kong to assist with colonial defence of the Hong Kong garrison during the First World War. As with Commonwealth War Graves Commissions (CWGC) memorials all over the world, the military memorial is open to the general public and access is through the staircase at the rear of the Hindu Temple.

==== Hong Kong Happy Valley Muslim Cemetery ====
The Happy Valley Muslim Cemetery contains 24 graves of South Asians from the Indian sub-continent who died during World War I and World War II. Section 1 of the cemetery at Happy Valley contains a special memorial to Muslims who died during both World Wars.

==== World War II ====
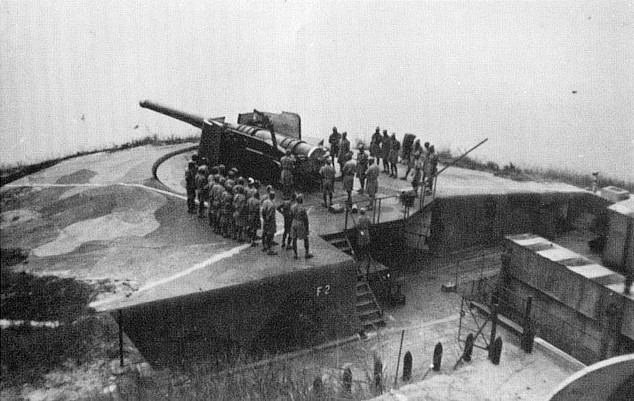
Indian gunners manning a 9.2-inch gun artillery position at Mount Davis Battery on Hong Kong Island

During World War II, soldiers of the Indian Army were involved in the Battle of Hong Kong. Indian troops were also incorporated within several overseas regiments as for example the Hong Kong Singapore Royal Artillery Regiment which had Sikh gunners.

US Consul Robert Ward, the highest ranking US official posted to Hong Kong at the outbreak of hostilities, bluntly evaluated the performance of Hong Kong Garrison in December 1941: "when the real fighting came it was the British soldiery that broke and ran. The Eurasians fought well and so did the Indians but the Kowloon line broke when the Royal Scots gave way. The same thing happened on the mainland".

===== Political context =====
Public sentiment in the Indian subcontinent, solely preoccupied with gaining independence from Britain, made it impossible for the Viceroy of India to obtain political consensus for entry into World War II by British India thereafter; the Indians were reluctant to be drawn into war in Europe and elsewhere for the defence of Britain's colonial territories. The unilateral declaration of India's entry into the war by Viceroy Lord Linlithgow, without consultation with elected leaders of the provincial assemblies in India, led to civil disobedience campaigns and calls for immediate independence from Britain. Some Indians, including soldiers serving overseas as personnel of the British Indian Army, were receptive to calls by Congress President Subhas Chandra Bose to join the Indian National Army of the Indian Independence League. Sikhs serving with the British Indian Army had customarily been permitted to retain their turbans in accordance to their religious traditions. Orders to wear steel helmets issued to Sikh soldiers of the British Indian Army sent to serve in Hong Kong with the 12th heavy regiment of the Royal Artillery Hong Kong Battery - ended in revolt in 1941 with many troops being charged with mutiny. British India participated in the war effort both at the planning stages (Eastern Group Supply Council) and in combat operations throughout Asia.

===== Battle of Hong Kong =====
The 5th Battalion of the 7th Rajput Regiment and 2nd Battalion of the 14th Punjab Regiment suffered the heaviest combat losses amongst all troop formations of the British Empire when the Imperial Japanese Army overran Hong Kong. Imperial Japanese Army committed atrocities against Indian civilians and soldiers during the Battle of Hong Kong.

===== Internment camps in Hong Kong for Indian POWs =====
Japanese occupation of Hong Kong saw Indians interred in significant numbers at Sham Shui Po Barracks, Argyle Street Camp, Ma Tau Chung, Stanley Internment Camp, North Point Camp and Gun Club Hill Barracks. Indian civilians sent food parcels to POWs interred at Stanley Internment Camp. Indians were posted on guard duty as sentries at internment camps. At the end of February 1942, the Japanese government stated that it held 3829 Indian prisoners of war in Hong Kong out of a total of 10947. Noteworthy Indian POWs who distinguished themselves during internment include Captain Mateen Ahmed Ansari of 5/7 Rajput Regiment and Subedar-Major Haider Rehinan Khan of 2/14 Punjab Regiment. The stories of Indian survivors of the Battle of Hong Kong are yet to be published.

== Hongkongers of South Asian origin ==
- Hari Harilela, chairman of the Harilela Group
- Vivek Mahbubani, stand-up comedian and TV presenter
- Anjali Rao - journalist & TV news program host
- Sir Hormusjee Naorojee Mody (12 October 1838 – 16 June 1911), businessman; donated a large sum of money to help establish the University of Hong Kong
- Dorabjee Naorojee Mithaiwala, founder of the Star Ferry
- Gill Mohindepaul Singh, actor
- Paul Chater, businessman and philanthropist
- Nabela Qoser, first non-ethnic Chinese reporter and presenter of Chinese-language news

== See also ==
- Hinduism in Hong Kong
- Khalsa Diwan Sikh Temple
- Pakistanis in China
- Sindhi diaspora
- Battle of Hong Kong (Contribution of troops from the Indian subcontinent to the defense of Hong Kong)
- Ruttonjee Hospital
