= Pakistanis in Hong Kong =

Total population
- 18,094 (2016 Census)

Languages
- Urdu, Punjabi, Pashto, Sindhi, Balochi, English and Cantonese.

Religion
- Islam, minority Sikhism, Hinduism, Christianity, Ahmadiyya

Related ethnic groups
- Pakistani diaspora

Pakistanis in Hong Kong are an ethnic minority in Hong Kong. According to Home Affairs Department, there are 24,385 Pakistani people live in Hong Kong constituting 4% of the Non-Chinese population based on the 2021 census. According to the 2016 Official Census this population was then 18,094. In the 2011 census, 17,253 people were Pakistani nationals, and the number decreased to 15,234 in the 2016 census.

== History ==
=== Migration ===
People from the modern-day Pakistani region first settled in Hong Kong in the 19th century when there was frequent trading between British India and China.

The East India Company initially traded with Japan. British ships used for transportation mostly sailed in Chinese waters. It led to the rapid development of trade between the company and China. As the same time, there was growing of the trading ships pass the Hong Kong seaport. The merchant fleets were usually composed by sailors from Pakistan. In 1829, the trade reached its peak and the gate for the early Muslims settling down in Hong Kong had been opened since then.

The early seamen from the Indian subcontinent mostly came from the shores of Malabar, Bay of Bengal, Hazara (Abbottabad), Lahore, Gujarat and Campbellpur (Attock). With Hong Kong beginning to develop into an important seaport for the British, more seamen and garrisons were passing through and some settled here.

During the early 19th century, subcontinental Muslims lived together with the other Muslim seamen. They had no proper accommodation or dormitory but somehow they managed to stay well-knitted together in an area known as Lower Lascar Row - in the Central area, better known to the Hong Kong old-timers as "Moro Kai".

"Moro Kai" was where they lived and their social practices such as Jamat (gathering) took place. They also started their business so they had their shops. Though they vacated their shops and residents years later, they had formed their community. As there were more Muslim garrisons stationing in Hong Kong later on, they began to form bodies to represent the various sections of the Muslim Society.

Before the independence of Pakistan Union by the partition of British India in 1947, British Indians frequently migrated to British Hong Kong. A significant majority of the British-Indian Muslims who migrated were from the region which is today's Pakistan and Bangladesh, but statistically, some of them are still counted as "Indians In Hong Kong".

== Geographic distribution and accommodation ==
Most of the Pakistanis reside in Kowloon or the New Territories. In 2006, 97.6% of Pakistanis living in Hong Kong were usual residents. There was 51.8% of Pakistanis having resided in Hong Kong for ten years and over, which was relatively high among the ethnic minorities in Hong Kong. The proportion of Pakistani households living in the private housing was 78%, while the remaining of 20% household lived in the public renting housing.

A majority of the Pakistanis encountered difficulties in finding accommodation, in both public and private housing sectors. In the current application system of public rental housing, a lack of language support and channel resulted that most Pakistanis not knowing how to apply for rental housing, and also, some of them believed that they are not qualified for applying for public housing, although some of them are eligible to do so. For those Pakistanis who lived in private housing, they had the experience that their nationality was frequently inquired by property owners and property agencies. Even worse, based on their nationality, some of the property owners and property agencies may refuse to rent the properties to them, or offer them properties with poor living conditions, resulting in housing and spatial segregation.

== Employment ==
=== Working population ===
For the labor force, Pakistani in Hong Kong of participation rates are females of some ethnic groups including Pakistanis contrasted sharply with their male counterparts.

The labour force participation rates for males were over 70% while the rates for females were below 40%. For Pakistanis, there are 33.1% of males were working in “Elementary occupations” such as porters, construction site workers while a 42.5% of females were “Clerks/Service workers and shop sales workers”.

It is a high sex ratio for the Pakistanis aged 45–64 indicates the presence of a large number of Pakistani men working in Hong Kong, perhaps leaving behind their families in their home countries.

=== Economy ===
Pakistanis who were born in Hong Kong have done tremendously well. This is because they were educated in Hong Kong and can speak fluent Cantonese. Hong Kong born Pakistanis have integrated well into society. However, it is a different picture for immigrants from Pakistan. It is difficult for immigrant Pakistanis to get jobs in Hong Kong mostly because of language. Besides, education levels, their identity as Pakistani, cultural and religious difference are also obstacles. Even at work, Pakistanis experienced many problems such as communication problems, being bullied, lack of preference, being lowered the payment, cultural or religious conflicts with others, being fired without reasonable accounts.

== Education ==
There are quite a few of ethnic minorities including Pakistanis aged 15 and over having attended post secondary education. Besides, a majority of them attended upper secondary or higher education. The school attendance rates of ethnic minorities exhibited very interesting sex differences. The rates for male ethnic minorities, except for age group 6–11, were in general higher than those for their female counterparts.

The major problems faced by Pakistani parents when they are finding school places for their children, is that they always have to wait unreasonably long for school vacancies and the school fees are expensive. Moreover, the main difficulty they face in school is the language. Hong Kong Education Department has been providing programmes to schools adopting mother-tongue (Cantonese) teaching.

== Community organisations ==
The Pakistani Student Association Hong Kong aims to uplift the educational and socio-economic status of Pakistani youth and community in Hong Kong, and encourages and promotes multicultural society in Hong Kong. For instance, the organization held an open forum at the Hong Kong Polytechnic University in 2008. Also, in the same year, the organization launched an interflow and held meetings with several educational institutes, NGO's and schools. Volunteer hiking, educational camps and team building activities are also held regularly.

Unison was established as a non-governmental organization in 2001 for ethnic equality and was registered as a public charitable institution in 2005. Its work includes advocacy, education, research and service referrals. Several researches have been conducted by Hong Kong Unison, which mainly focused on the general attitudes towards Ethnic Minorities in Hong Kong, education and employment.

Christian Action is a registered charitable organization in Hong Kong. Christian Action Shine Centre was established in 2009 to provide support services to ethnic minorities and local organisations. The center updates the job vacancies and employment information for their members. Employment workshops, such as "Career development through vocational education" and "Labour laws and practice in Hong Kong", and visits to various job fairs are organized by the centre in 2010.

== Media ==
=== Television ===
No Urdu language is provided in the domestic free television program services.

CABLE Communications Limited – carried two Pakistan Channels from Indus TV Network- I-Plus and Indus Vision on July 27, 2004, for the Cable TV subscribers. I-Plus is an infotainment channel in English and Urdu language and Indus Vision is a family channel in Urdu language. Two channels last for a year only.

RTHK– has produced some TV programmes for Hong Kong people to understand the Pakistanis as an ethnic minority group in local society.

=== Radio ===
Radio Television Hong Kong (RTHK) Radio 3- launched “Hong Kong Ki Shaam”( Hong Kong THIS evening) in Urdu since 2008. The program was extended from half an hour to one hour after a year until now. The extension are mainly for covering more useful information for the ethnic minorities to integrate into the society.

Metro Plus – launched “Ramadan program for Pakistani” in Urdu language during 2007 to 2009.

== Notable people ==
Ghufran Memon, Consul General of Pakistan who has been a strong advocate for cultural assimilation between two communities. Deputy Consul General of Pakistan Malik Muhammad Asim Mr Saeeduddin Mr Qamar Mihas Mr Javed Iqbal Chaudhri Gulzar Qari Muhammad Tayab Mufti Arshad Pervez Akhtar, Head of California school, Hong Kong Kemal Bokhary* Daoud Bokhary, stockbroker and father of Court of Final Appeal judge Kemal Bokhary

Heina Rizwan Mohammad, is the first South Asian woman to be recruited as a police officer for the Hong Kong Police Force and received 27 week training. Hong Kong-born Heina Rizwan Mohammad will work as a police constable in district Yuen Long. Nabela Qoser is the first Cantonese-language news reporter of non-ethnic Chinese descent in Hong Kong.

== See also ==
- Hong Kong–Pakistan relations
- South Asians in Hong Kong
- Pakistanis in China
- Chinese people in Pakistan
- Islam in Hong Kong

== Sources ==
- Chan, Kam Wah and Ku, Hok Bun (2005). 排斥少數族裔：香港巴裔人士的住屋經驗.In May Tam, Hok Bun Ku and Travis Kong (Eds.), Rethinking and recasting citizenship: Social exclusion and marginality in Chinese societies. Hong Kong:The Hong Kong Polytechnic University.
- Ku, Hok-bun, Hong Kong Polytechnic University, and Sheng Kung Hui Lady MacLehose Centre. (2003). A research report on the life experiences of Pakistanis in Hong Kong. Research report series. Vol. 7. Hong Kong: Centre for Social Policy Studies, Department of Applied Social Sciences, The Hong Kong Polytechnic University.
