= Hong Kong–Pakistan relations =

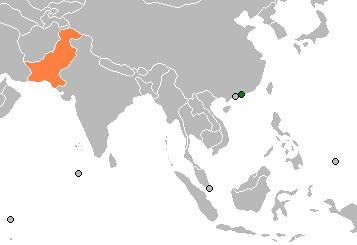
- Hong Kong: Pakistan

Hong Kong–Pakistan relations refers to the bilateral relationship between Hong Kong and Pakistan. Hong Kong and Pakistan were once both British colonies, until Pakistan achieved independence from the United Kingdom in 1947, and the United Kingdom handed over Hong Kong to China in 1997.

A Pakistan Consulate was established in Wan Chai, Hong Kong Island in Hong Kong.

== Migration ==
A number of Pakistanis migrated to Hong Kong throughout the 19th and 20th centuries, when many of them worked and traveled as merchant ships sailors. Prior to 1947 when Pakistan was part of British India, these Pakistanis migrated to British Hong Kong under the identity of British Indians. Nowadays, Pakistani descendants form 0.2% of Hong Kong's total population, with most of them being Muslims. Pakistani communities such as the Pakistani Association of Hong Kong were established in Hong Kong to enhance social relations between the two.

== Trade ==
In 2014, the value of exports from Hong Kong to Pakistan was worth 1.232 billion Hong Kong dollars, while the importing goods from Pakistan to Hong Kong was worth 2.917 billion Hong Kong dollars. Major exports from Hong Kong are telephones (24%) and broadcasting accessories (5.2%). Major exports from Pakistan to Hong Kong are non-retail pure cotton yarn (36%), and tanned equine and bovine hides (20%).

== Education ==
On January 5, 2023, a memorandum of understanding (MOU) was signed between Ministry of Federal Education and Professional Training of Pakistan and Education Bureau of Hong Kong to strengthen educational ties between both countries. It was signed between Secretary for Education Choi Yuk-lin and Consul-General of Pakistan in Hong Kong Bilal Ahmad Butt. Visiting Pakistani Ambassador to China Moin-ul-Haque witnessed the signing. The Deputy Consul General of Pakistan Malik Muhammad Asim was also present on that occasion. In September, 2023 Federal Board of Intermediate and Secondary Education (FBISE) has signed Memorandum of Understanding (MOU) with the Hong Kong Examination Assessment Authority to conduct examinations in Urdu as an international language for students in Hong Kong.

== Strategic relations ==
Pakistan was among the first countries to start an official diplomatic relations with the People's Republic of China. And China–Pakistan relations have been among the closest and most supportive diplomatic relationship since then. With the tight binds between Hong Kong and mainland China since 1997, the warmth of Hong Kong–Pakistan relations has continued and that economic ties between the two are expected to increase as both are included in the Chinese strategic One Belt, One Road area. The Hong Kong Government will expand the scope of the Targeted Scholarship Scheme, to cover the whole Belt and Road region, as well as to allocate $200 million to support the professional services sector in launching publicity and arranging exchanges and co-operation with the Belt and Road countries; launch a Belt and Road Portal; and set up Belt and Road Steering Committee and Office. Hong Kong has a strong presence in the development of Pakistani strategic coastal economic plans. Gwadar Special Economic Zone is located near a 2,282 acre free trade area in Gwadar which is being modelled on the lines of the Special Economic Zones of China. The swathe of land was handed to the China Overseas Port Holding Company in November 2015 as part of a 43-year lease. The company is based in Hong Kong and will be in full charge of Gwadar Port, the third-largest port in Pakistan, the international airport and a sea area management company in Gwadar. Gwadar is speculated by many as "Hong Kong West", "New Hong Kong" or "Pakistan’s Hong Kong".

Prime Minister of Pakistan Muhammad Nawaz Sharif arrived in Hong Kong on 16 May 2017 for a three-day visit and meeting with Hong Kong Chief Executive Leung Chun Ying at Government House, Hong Kong on 17 May 2017.

== See also ==
- China–Pakistan relations
