= News At Seven-Thirty =

- 七點半新聞報道
- Genre: News programme
- Created by: TVB News
- Country of origin: Hong Kong
- Original language: English

Production
- Producer: TVB
- Production location: Hong Kong
- Running time: 25 minutes

Original release
- Network: TVB Pearl
- Release: 19 November 1967 – present

Related
- News at 6:30

News At Seven-Thirty (Chinese: 七點半新聞報道; Jyutping: cat1 dim2 bun3 san1 man4 bou3 dou6, also known as News At 7:30), is the flagship evening news program of the Hong Kong television channel TVB Pearl. It is presented in English, and is broadcast daily at 07:30 PM.

== History ==
News at 7:30 was launched on 19 November 1967, and is one of the longest running newscasts in Hong Kong, alongside News at 6:30 on its sister channel, TVB Jade.

In the wake of the 2019–2020 Hong Kong protests, several of the show's principal anchors resigned in protest of TVB's handling of the protests, and in fear of increasing government censorship. These included long-time anchors Chris Lincoln, Sonya Artero, Tony Sabine, and James Aitken.

== Special news ==
- Early Nightly World News (1 December 1988 - 30 May 1993)
- News Line (31 May 1993 - 8 July 1995)

== Presenters ==
The show was typically presented by one male and one female anchor. However, since July 2022, it has been presented by only one anchor, currently Jacky Lin, Timothy Li, Daniel Rowell, or Danni Zhou.

- Former presenters:
  - Chris Lincoln (1996 - 2018)
  - Sonya Artero (2010 - 2019)
  - Chris Gelken (2010 - 2013) (died in 2014)
  - Tony Sabine (2011 - 2021)
  - James Aitken (2013 - 2022)
  - Etienne Lamy-Smith (2011 - 2013)
  - Jeff Tang (2012 - 2019)
  - Ray Rudowski (1996 - 2000)
  - Peter Koveos (2020 - 2022)
  - Mark Niu (1996 - 1998)
  - Derek Johnson
  - Jenny Lam (1991 - 2012)
  - Regina de Luna (2000 - 2008)
  - Diane To (2010 - 2017)
  - Priscilla Ng (2008 - 2012)
  - Elmy Lung (2016 - 2019)
  - Diana Lin (1988 - 2004)
  - Wah Chen (1994 - 1997)
  - Chee-May Chow (1997 - 2000)
  - Eric Finney (2000 - 2005)
  - Betty Liu
  - Anne Marie Sim
  - Teressa Siu
  - Marylois Chan
  - Louisa Lim
  - Deborah Kan
  - Sharon Tang (2020 - 2023)
  - Melissa Gecolea (2020 - 2026)
- Incumbent presenters:
  - Jacky Lin (2022 - )
  - Timothy Li (2024 - )
  - Daniel Rowell (2022; 2024 - )
  - Danni Zhou (2026 - )
