= Pakistan Embassy College Beijing =

International school in Beijing, China

- 北京巴基斯坦大使馆学院 پاکستان سفارتخانہ کالج بیجنگ

Location
- 1 Dongzhimenwai Dajie, Sanlitun; Chaoyang District; Beijing
- Coordinates: 39.94097°N 116.45438°E

Information
- Established: 1969
- Principal: Shazia Amjad
- Faculty: 45
- Grades: Kindergarten to Class XII (HSSC) and CIE AS/A Level (IGCSE)
- Gender: Co-education
- Enrollment: Approx. 500
- Language: Urdu, English, Chinese
- Campus size: 2000 square meters
- Team name: Pecbians
- Website: pecbeijing.com

Pakistan Embassy College Beijing

Chinese name
- Simplified Chinese: 北京巴基斯坦大使馆学院
- Traditional Chinese: 北京巴基斯坦大使館學院
Transcriptions
Standard Mandarin
- Hanyu Pinyin: Běijīng Bājīsītǎn Dàshǐguǎn Xuéyuàn
- Wade–Giles: Pei-ching Pa-chi-ssu-t'an Ta-shih-kuan Hsüeh-yüan

Urdu name
- Urdu: پاکستان سفارتخانہ کالج بیجنگ

Pakistan Embassy College Beijing (PECB; Chinese: 北京巴基斯坦大使馆学院, Urdu: پاکستان سفارتخانہ کالج بیجنگ) is a Pakistan International School located on the Embassy of Pakistan compound in Sanlitun, Chaoyang District, Beijing. It serves students aged 4–19, in kindergarten through senior school.

== History ==
The school was established in 1969. Initially, it was known as Pakistan School Beijing. It was the first foreign school in Beijing.

In 1970, it relocated to a structure with 14 classrooms, and in 1975, secondary levels were added. In December 1980, it relocated to its present location inside the embassy complex.

In June 2017, the school had 500 pupils registered, 50% of them were foreigners from 56 different countries. At the time, the institution employed 45 Chinese and Pakistani faculty members.

In 2019, a Chinese language laboratory was inaugurated at the college.

There is a student council at the college and elections are held annually.

== Sports team ==
- Association Football (Soccer)

== See also ==
- China–Pakistan relations
- Pakistanis in China
