= TVB Pearl =

Television channel in Hong Kong

TVB Pearl 無綫電視明珠台
- TVB Pearl logo
- Country: China
- Broadcast area: Hong Kong; Macau; Guangdong; USA
- Headquarters: 77 Chun Choi Street, Tseung Kwan O Industrial Estate, New Territories, Hong Kong, China

Programming
- Languages: English (Main language); Mandarin; Cantonese (Second language)
- Picture format: 1080i HDTV (downscaled to 576i for the SDTV feed)

Ownership
- Owner: TVB Limited
- Sister channels: TVB Jade; TVB Plus; TVB News Channel

History
- Launched: 19 November 1967; 58 years ago

Links
- Website: pearl.tvb.com

Availability

Terrestrial
- Digital TV (Hong Kong): Channel 84 (HD)

Streaming media
- Affiliated Streaming Service(s): myTV SUPER

TVB Pearl (Chinese: 無綫電視明珠台) is an English-language free-to-air television channel in Hong Kong owned by TVB Limited. Established on 19 November 1967, it shares headquarters with TVB's other properties at TVB City at 77 Chun Choi Street in Tseung Kwan O Industrial Estate in Tseung Kwan O, in the Sai Kung District.

The channel mainly broadcasts in English (while all of its sister channels mainly broadcast in Cantonese), although programmes in other languages (including Mandarin, Filipino, Japanese and Korean) are aired in non-peak hours and Traditional Chinese subtitles are available on some programmes. Since 1991, the channel has used NICAM digital audio (and later, multiple audio tracks via digital terrestrial television) to transmit audio tracks in English and Cantonese when available. The channel began broadcasting in high definition on 28 October 2012.

TVB Pearl's schedule relies heavily on imported programmes, including foreign drama series and animations and movies. Original English-language news and current affairs programmes (such as News at 7:30) and original lifestyle programme Dolce Vita are also available on the channel.

Some programmes are produced by foreign television and film studios, such as Sony Pictures Television, Fremantle, Universal Pictures, Paramount Pictures, Skydance Media, Warner Bros. Pictures, Banijay, ABS-CBN Studios, GMA Network, TV5 Entertainment, Mediacorp, and others.

== Programmes ==
=== News and public affairs ===
The channel airs current affairs programmes, including Pearl Magazine (to replace both The Pearl Report and Money Magazine in 2018) and Straight Talk. Also, Money Matters aired between 28 September 2020 and 30 January 2023.

News at 7:30 and News Roundup is aired every day with single presenters since 2023.

- Jacky Lin (2020–present)
- Timothy Li (2023–present)
- Daniel Rowell (2021–present)
- Danni Zhou (2024–present)

Weather Report and Financial Report (Weekdays only) is aired immediately after the main news. Presenters include Jacky Lin, Danni Zhou, Mimosa Ngai, Sakura Ip, Bobo Ho, Celine Chan, Timothy Li and Daniel Rowell.

=== Studio 930 ===
At 9:30 p.m. every evening, a blockbuster film is broadcast on TVB Pearl with its original English audio track (or dubbed into Cantonese with English subtitles) before News Roundup news programmes.

== Transmitters ==
TVB Pearl is broadcast through UHF from its six main transmission stations at Temple Hill, Golden Hill, Castle Peak, Kowloon Peak, Tai Mo Shan, and Lamma Island, and two repeaters at Tsuen Wan and Tsing Yi. The Tsuen Wan repeater started service on 22 August 2003, and the Tsing Yi repeater started on 18 September 2003. The repeaters were built to enhance reception of TVB Pearl.

TVB Pearl is available to cable systems within the Pearl River Delta region of Mainland China.

TVB Pearl's analogue transmission ceased on 30 November 2020.

== Awards ==
TVB Pearl has received a number of awards throughout its long history of programme production. For example, The Pearl Report: Outsider won a merit at the Hong Kong Human Rights Press Awards 2002. Also, 2008 Olympic Image was awarded the Bronze Medal (Station and Image Production) in the New York Festivals.

== See also ==
- ViuTVsix, an English-language channel in Hong Kong since March 2017
- Hong Kong International Business Channel, Channel 76, an English-language channel in Hong Kong since March 2018
