= Maggie Leung =

Hong Kong actress (born 1995)

- 梁敏巧
- Leung in 2026
- Education: Performance-level diploma (piano); Bachelor of Journalism and Communication
- Alma mater: Fanling Lutheran Secondary School

Maggie Leung Man-hau (Chinese: 梁敏巧) is a Hong Kong hostess and actress, who was a reporter for the overseas edition of People's Daily and Oriental Daily. She entered the entertainment industry by participating in the Miss Hong Kong Pageant 2019 and became a TVB artist under the TVB manager contract.

== Summary ==
Leung grew up in Sha Tau Kok and Fanling, and attended Fanling Lutheran Secondary School. She started learning piano at the age of 6 and performed her own compositions on stage when she was in primary school, She was a member of the archery team in secondary school. In May 2019, Leung signed up for the Miss Hong Kong Pageant because she felt depressed in life and hoped to find something to stimulate her.

Leung had planned to study at the Beijing Film Academy after the competition, but chose to sign with TVB.

Leung has been the location host for the program "Scoop" since July 2021. In October 2023, while investigating a suspected case of profiting from refugee food, she confronted the woman involved, "Mrs. Pang," and was subsequently assaulted, sustaining a cut to her lip. This incident sparked public outcry. In 2025, Leung's popularity soared after participating in the TVB dating reality show "A Date with Goddess".

== Personal life ==
Leung stated her first boyfriend was extremely possessive, making over a hundred calls in an hour before they broke up. Her second boyfriend was repeatedly unfaithful, and her third relationship ended amicably in 2024 due to personality differences.

In 2024, Leung interviewed Wong Chun-ho, nicknamed "Babyface," on the program "Scam Alert". She was subsequently pursued by him and even received a marriage proposal, but she refused his advances. In 2025, during her participation in the "A Date with Goddess", Leung once again rejected Wong Chun-ho, causing him to give up on pursuing her and find a new partner. Leung was ultimately paired with lawyer Matthew "Matt" Lau Kai-chun on the show, but later stated that the two were still getting to know each other and had not officially become a couple.

== Performance Works ==
=== TV Series ===
Year	Title	Role(s)
TVB
2020 - present	Come Home Love: Lo And Behold	
2021	Shadow of Justice	couple
2021	Take Two	hostess
2022	Stranger Anniversary	
2022	Silver Lining	hostess
2022	The Beauty of War	nurse
2022	Go With The Float	hostess
2023	Treasure of Destiny	reporter audience
2023	Speakers of Law	young lawyer
2023	Unchained Medley	music label employee
2025	Anonymous Signal	reporter guest
2025	Heroes in White	news anchor
2025	The Fading Gold	Amy (梁愛美)
Shaw Brothers
2022	Flying Tiger 3	

=== Hosting a program ===
Aired	Name	Reference
TVB
2020 - 2021	Kids, Think Big	
2021 - present	Scoop	
2025	A Date with Goddess	
