= Pakistanis in China =

Total population
- 30,000 (2020)

Regions with significant populations
- Xinjiang: Kashgar and Ürümqi; Zhejiang: Yiwu; Guangdong: Guangzhou; Shanghai; Beijing

Religion
- Predominantly Muslim, minority others

Related ethnic groups
- Tajiks of Xinjiang, Uyghurs, Pakistanis in Hong Kong

Pakistanis in China consist largely of temporary residents, including international students and cross-border traders. They are concentrated in the Xinjiang autonomous region of Northwest China.

== Students ==
In December 2004, Pakistan concluded an agreement with the China Scholarship Council to send official scholarship students to China; the first batch of 300 were scheduled to enroll at 15 different universities in China in June 2005, with later batches of 500 each over the following five years. Their classes will use English as the medium of instruction, while they will study Chinese on the side as a foreign language. The total number of Pakistani students across China was estimated at 1,000 as of 2006. Xinjiang is one of the major destinations for Pakistanis coming to China. As of 2009, about 500 Pakistani international students were enrolled at universities in Xinjiang, the largest proportion—484—at Xinjiang Medical University. The desire to attract Pakistani students was a major driver behind the university's decision to move away from using Chinese as their medium of instruction, even though it has proven challenging for the professors there. They include about 120 students drawn from among the large migrant population of Pakistanis in Saudi Arabia.

In 2012, there were over 5,000 Pakistani students in China and most were studying medicine.

In 2016, there were 19,000 Pakistani students studying at Chinese universities, making Pakistan the fourth largest source of international students in the country. The main disciplines of studies pursued included medicine, engineering, economics and management.

In 2025, Pakistan ranked third among the sources of international students in China, with more than 28,023 Pakistani students enrolled in Chinese universities. Of the Pakistani students studying in China, approximately 7,034 were enrolled on scholarships. The growth in Pakistani enrolment has been linked to preferential policies introduced by the Chinese government following the launch of the China–Pakistan Economic Corridor under the Belt and Road Initiative. According to official figures, 6,156 Pakistani students were enrolled in doctoral programmes, 3,600 in master’s programmes, 11,100 in bachelor’s programmes and 3,000 in short-term exchange programmes across China. Pakistani students in China are concentrated in fields including Chinese language studies, engineering, medicine, and computer science, alongside other disciplines.

== Traders ==
Due to the liberalisation of foreign exchange controls on renminbi in border areas, Kashgar, which is closer to Pakistan than other major cities of Xinjiang, was a popular destination for Pakistani traders as early as the 1990s. In accordance with a 1985 protocol agreement, the Khunjerab Pass border crossing between Pakistan and China on the Karakorum Highway closes between January and April. This has sometimes caused difficulties for Pakistan traders who enter Xinjiang on border passes, as in 2004 when 700 traders were expelled.

Later on, a large community of Pakistani traders formed in Urumqi, estimated at between 1,000 and 2,000 people. They tend to live in Uyghur neighbourhoods, but at the same time, there is a certain level of tension between Uyghurs and Pakistanis, due to the two groups' relative economic positions, as well as cultural disagreements over alleged laxness in the Uyghurs' practise of Islam. In the past, Uyghurs were able to benefit economically by playing an intermediary role for Pakistani traders who came to Xinjiang, selling them goods shipped north from Guangdong where they were produced, or providing transport services; however, since the early 2000s, Pakistani traders have tended to go directly to Guangdong to purchase goods, and Han Chinese-owned trucking firms have taken over much of the land cargo market in Xinjiang. There have been some Chinese media reports suggesting that Pakistanis in Xinjiang are connected to drug trafficking problems; however, others claim that Afghans with false Pakistani documents are smuggling drugs and giving Pakistanis a bad name.

Another popular destination for Pakistani businesspeople is Yiwu, Zhejiang. In 2006, 3,232 Pakistani nationals entered China at Yiwu, and 425 Pakistani nationals stayed in the city as residents.

== Education ==
Pakistan Embassy College Beijing is in Beijing.

== See also ==
- China–Pakistan relations
- Indians in China
- Chinese people in Pakistan
- South Asians in Hong Kong
- Pakistanis in Hong Kong

== Sources ==
- Haider, Ziad (2005), "Sino-Pakistan relations and Xinjiang's Uyghurs: Politics, Trade, and Islam along the Karakoram Highway" (PDF), Asian Survey, 45 (4): 533, doi:10.1525/as.2005.45.4.522, archived from the original (PDF) on 2012-05-07
- Wang Dongmei/王冬梅; La Xiaolin/腊晓琳; Yin Yan/殷艳 (2008), "对留学生妇产科学教学方法的探讨", 新疆医科大学学报/Journal of Xinjiang Medical University, 31 (1): 112–113, ISSN 1009-5551
