= News at 6:30 =

- 六點半新聞報道
- Genre: News
- Created by: TVB News
- Country of origin: Hong Kong
- Original language: Cantonese

Production
- Producer: TVB
- Production location: Hong Kong
- Running time: Weekdays 44–52 minutes; Weekends 22–25 minutes

Original release
- Network: TVB Jade
- Release: 19 November 1967 – present

Related
- News At Seven-Thirty

News at 6:30 (Chinese: 六點半新聞報道), is the flagship evening Cantonese news programme that is broadcast nightly at 6:30 pm in Hong Kong on TVB Jade. This programme first aired on TVB Jade on 19 November 1967. News at 6:30 can also be watched for free on TVB News' website.

News at 6:30 has aired in high definition every day since 18 March 2013. The HD Jade channel aired an extra bulletin, News at 7 instead of News at 6:30 from 2009 to 2015. The bulletin is simulcast on both SD and HD versions of Jade on Saturday and Sunday.

TVB News axed the sports bulletin on the weekday version of News at 6:30 on 3 May 2010.

== Broadcasting length ==
News at 6:30 usually broadcasts for approximately an hour on weeknights and 25 minutes on weekends, followed by Weather Report. On special occasions such as the Handover of Hong Kong, opening of the Hong Kong International Airport, Jiji earthquake, September 11 attacks, Indian Ocean earthquake and tsunami, 2008 Sichuan earthquake, 2010 Haiti earthquake, Tōhoku earthquake and tsunami and COVID-19 pandemic the show was extended to one hour.

== Notable presenters ==
- Former presenters:
- Stanley So, Keith Yuen, Leung Ka-Wing, Chung-Ming Chui, Claudia Mo, Anite Yip, Kit-Ching Ho, Carmen Luk, Eric Chau, Li-Chan Wing, Hing-Chau Wong, Ivan Yau, Lee Man Jing, Mimi Yeung, Leung Kit Ngo, Lee Shui Bing, Jo Ngai, Peri Chow, Bonnie Chiu, Wong Shuk Ming, Shuk-Fong Teng, Oscar Lee, Winnie Chui, Sharon Ng, Alison Chiu, Ella Ng, Ruby Lam, Raymond Yi, Ng Fong Wing, Lau Yun-Ching, Kwok Chi Long, Mei Ling Sze, Akina Fong, Kaman Lee, Jordi Lau, Elsa Kwok, Kendrew Wong, Wing-ki Kwok, Edward Hui, Julia Poon, Venus Chow, Vincent Ng, Andrew Lau, Tiffani Lau, Yyonne Law, Jordi Lau, Fung Kin-Shing, Karen Cheng, Kenneth Ng, Christy Nam, Connie Lee, Wendy Cheung, Maggie Leung, Anthony Fong, Lilian Lai, Jeffrey Siu, William Poon, Kam Po Chan, Toni Wong
- Incumbent presenters:
- Trevor Lee, Melvin Pang, Vinky Wong, Kennie Chan, Nathan Leung, Alpha Lai
