= The Pearl Report =

- Genre: Public Affairs
- Created by: TVB News
- Presented by: Chris Lincoln
- Original language: English

Production
- Executive producer: Chris Lincoln
- Producer: TVB
- Production location: Hong Kong
- Running time: 30 minutes

Original release
- Network: TVB Pearl
- Release: 1 April 1988 – 25 June 2018

Related
- Pearl Magazine

The Pearl Report is a public affairs programme aired on TVB Pearl from 1 April 1988 to 25 June 2018.

The show mainly deals with current affairs in Hong Kong, although there are also stories concerning wider regional and international issues, often produced abroad. Locations covered include the United Kingdom, the United States, Australia, Germany, Russia, Malaysia, Canada, Oman, Vietnam, Thailand, Japan, the Philippines, the United Arab Emirates and all different parts of China.

A broad spectrum of topic areas is covered on the Pearl Report, including political, social, health, education, human rights, economic and sport-related issues.

Pearl Magazine, the successor to The Pearl Report, debuted on 2 July 2018 at the same airtime.

== History ==
The programme first broadcast in 1988. It was cancelled by TVB in 2018 with the last original programme was aired on 21 May 2018. After that episode, the same time slot re-run 5 more previously award-winning episodes, making 25 June as the final air date.

== Format ==
The show is divided into two segments to make up a half-hour show. In-depth documentaries normally last the entire duration of the programme but some stories take up just a single segment.

Each segment begins with an introduction from the show's host and Senior Executive Producer Diana Lin. The stories often start with a teaser to set the tone. Part One usually ends with a hook, giving viewers a taste of what is to follow in Part Two. After a commercial break Diana Lin reappears to introduce the next part, which tends to contain greater focus than the first segment. The host returns at the end of the programme to sign off.

== Producers/reporters ==
The Pearl Report team is made up of its Senior Executive Producer, Diana Lin, six full-time producers and a part-time reporter. They were:

- Diana Lin (Host, 1988–2018)
- Chris Lincoln (Host, 2018)
- Maria Cristhin Kuiper
- Victor Ting
- Keina Chiu
- Ambrose Li

Previous producers include:

- Renato Reyes
- Aleks Solum
- Billy Wong
- Yan Zhao
- Christy Leung
- Annie Lau
- Phillippa Stewart
- Chan Siu Sin
- Vince Lung
- Naomi Kwok
- Douglas George
- Rainbow Ngai
- Erica Poon
- Sebastian Chau
- Douglas Lam
- Diane To
- Gus Chan
- Joyce Liu
- Lisa Percey
- Peter Maize (Host until 1990s)
- Emily Maitlis

== Interviewees ==
A number of notable figures have been interviewed on The Pearl Report.

Interviewees include:

Margaret Thatcher Vidal Ramos Lu Ping Gloria Macapagal Arroyo Lee Kwan Yew

- David Akers-Jones
- Timothy Fok
- Matthew Hoggard
- Lim Guan Eng
- Chris Patten
- Stephen Chan Chi-wan
- Donald Tsang
- Anson Chan

Jamie Higgins and Rosie Craig

== Awards ==
Pearl Report shows have won numerous awards including:

- The New York TV and Film Festival Award
- RTNA Edward Murrow: Asia Television Award
