= Chinese people in Pakistan =

- (China) (Pakistan)

Total population
- 60,000 (2018)

Regions with significant populations
- Karachi, Lahore, Peshawar, Faisalabad, Port Qasim and Islamabad

Languages
- English · Urdu · Mandarin Chinese · Cantonese · Uyghur · other languages of China

Religion
- Irreligion, Buddhism, Islam

Related ethnic groups
- Chinese diaspora

The Chinese people in Pakistan (Urdu: چینی) comprise one of Pakistan's significant expatriate communities. The China-Pakistan Economic Corridor has raised the expatriate population, which has grown from 20,000 in 2013 to 60,000 in 2018.

== Distribution ==
=== Karachi ===
During the 1940s many Chinese Muslims fled unrest in China and settled in Karachi. However the Chinese community there is primarily of non-Muslim origins; their ancestors were Buddhists, but subsequent generations follow other religions or none at all. About 30% are estimated to have converted to Islam.

Most Chinese in Karachi are second generation children of immigrants—the oldest generation have mostly died off, while the third generation have emigrated to other countries. Common destinations for emigrants are the United States, Canada, and the United Kingdom, or to their ancestral country China. They rarely wear Chinese clothing, but still retain the Chinese language, though in recent years they have shown increasing language shift towards Urdu. Previously, the community was segregated by provincial origin, but with the establishment of a Chinese Committee to represent the community, they have become more integrated. They are concentrated in a few neighbourhoods, including near the PECHS and Tariq Road, as well as Saddar and more recently Clifton and Defence neighbourhoods in Saddar Town. The Clifton and Defense Society areas has about 15 Chinese restaurants; the area is sometimes unofficially referred to as "Chinatown". One of the more well-known of these, the ABC Chinese Restaurant, founded by Li Dianxian (李殿贤) in the 1930s, was once patronised by Zhou Enlai, and continued operating until 1988.

Common professions include beauticians, shoemakers, dentists, and the restaurant trade; most members of the second generation tend to follow the same trade as their parents did. Chinese dentists, in particular, have a reputation for providing quality service to the low-income residents of the city. Yet many of them are unlicensed and lack any formal training in dentistry. Instead, many of their parents had previously lived among the Chinese community in British Malaya (present-day Malaysia) and worked as dental assistants; when they came to Pakistan in the 1940s, they began practicing as full dentists themselves. There was a shortage of dentists in Karachi at that time, as there was only one dental school in the entire province of Sindh, at Hyderabad. They primarily provided simple procedures such as manufacture and fitting of dentures as well as extraction of teeth; however, in later years, some prospered enough that they were able to hire formally trained dentists to provide more complex procedures.

=== Other areas ===
In Lahore, Chinese Muslims established a mosque called the Chini Masjid (Chinese Mosque). They typically intermarried with local people and assimilated. The two Chinese shoemakers there, Hopson and Kingson, had a reputation for high quality.

== Migrant workers ==
Despite the emigration of members of older communities, the Chinese population in Pakistan has been bolstered by new expatriate residents. As of 2007, there were roughly 3,500 Chinese engineers temporarily residing in Pakistan for work on various state-run projects in various locations, especially in the construction of the Gwadar Port. Their total number might have been as high as 5,000. About 1,200 were estimated to reside in Islamabad. Then, between 2008 and 2009, the number of Chinese working in Pakistan grew sharply, to an estimated 10,000, even as expatriate workers of other nationalities left the country. Year to date numbers of migrant Chinese approximate half a million due to the string of pearls policy for China oil consumption.

== Ethnic minorities ==
Some members of ethnic minorities of China, primarily Muslim Uyghurs and Tajiks from Xinjiang, have also settled in the northern parts of Pakistan. The earliest migrants, numbering in the thousands, came in the 1940s in fear of communist persecution. A few hundred more fled to Pakistan in the aftermath of a failed uprising in Khotan in 1954. Later waves of migration came in 1963 and again in 1974. Beginning in the 1980s, more Uyghurs who had left China to go on the hajj began settling in Pakistan instead of returning to China.

== Organisations ==
There are Chinese community organisations in a number of Pakistani cities:

- Gilgit: Chinese Association of Gilgit (吉尔吉特华人华侨协会)
- Islamabad: Chinese Association of Islamabad (伊斯兰堡华人华侨协会)
- Lahore: Chinese Association of Lahore (拉合尔华人华侨协会)
- Rawalpindi: Chinese Association of Rawalpindi (拉瓦尔品第华人华侨协会)
- Karachi: Chinese Association of Karachi (卡拉奇华人华侨协会)

Because of the various threats to Chinese workers in Pakistan, the Chinese embassy have also formed a liaison committee with the Pakistani government to look into safety issues.

== Notable people ==
- Paul Chiang, Pakistani-Canadian politician of Chinese descent

== See also ==
- China–Pakistan relations
- Pakistanis in China
- Pakistani Chinese cuisine

== Sources ==
- Haider, Ziad (2005), "Sino-Pakistan relations and Xinjiang's Uyghurs: Politics, Trade, and Islam along the Karakoram Highway" (PDF), Asian Survey, 45 (4): 522–545, doi:10.1525/as.2005.45.4.522, archived from the original (PDF) on 2012-05-07
- Rahman, Anwar (2005), Sinicization beyond the Great Wall: China's Xinjiang Uighur Autonomous Region, Troubador Publishing, ISBN 978-1-904744-88-7
