= Hong Kong Human Rights Press Awards =

The Hong Kong Human Rights Press Awards recognize coverage of issues included in the United Nations Universal Declaration of Human Rights, as related to Asia.

== Organization ==
The awards were run by the Foreign Correspondents' Club, Hong Kong, Amnesty International Hong Kong and the Hong Kong Journalists Association. On April 25, 2022, the FCC announced the suspension of the awards citing fears of "unintentionally" violating the city's National Security Law, leading to the resignation of 8 members from the organization's Press Freedom Committee and public criticism.

After the FCC announcement, US-based nonprofit The Campaign for Hong Kong's President Samuel Chu announced his organization would step in to honor the 2022 winners in a virtual ceremony on May 10, 2022.

== Content ==
Past recipients have been from all over the world, have worked for various international media organizations, and have covered various countries, mostly in Southeast Asia and China. These include local journalists from the South China Morning Post, regional media like Radio Free Asia and The Far Eastern Economic Review, and international media like the Wall Street Journal.

Works are not restricted to those from or about Hong Kong, though the awards do emphasize Hong Kong's place as a model of free speech in the area.

Guests speakers have included activists like John Kamm, who works with China to improve its human rights record, and Cardinal Joseph Zen, the highest-ranking Catholic prelate in greater China.
