= TVB News =

Hong Kong news organization

TVB News and Information Services Division
- Native name: 無綫電視新聞及資訊部
- Formerly: TVB News and Public Affairs Division
- Type: Division
- Industry: Journalism
- Founded: 19 November 1967; 58 years ago
- Headquarters: TVB City; 77 Chun Choi Street; Tseung Kwan O, Hong Kong
- Key people: Yuen Chi Wai (Assistant General Manager, News and Information Services); Wong Suk Ming (Controller)
- Parent: TVB
- Website: news.tvb.com

TVB News
- Traditional Chinese: 無綫新聞
Transcriptions
Yue: Cantonese
- Jyutping: mou4 sin3 san1 man4

TVB News and Information Services Division (Chinese: 無綫電視新聞及資訊部; TVB News) is the news department of the Hong Kong broadcaster TVB. It is responsible for news programming in Cantonese, English and Mandarin for TVB Jade, TVB Pearl, Finance & Information Channel, and the 24-hour News Channel.

A 2026 survey by the Reuters Institute said TVB News was the most used news brand in Hong Kong. It ranked 6th among 15 media outlets in trust and was the 3rd most untrusted outlet behind Bastille Post and Dot Dot News. In media credibility surveys conducted by the Chinese University of Hong Kong, TVB has typically ranked above average among Hong Kong's media outlets, though it has dropped to below average since 2016.

== History ==
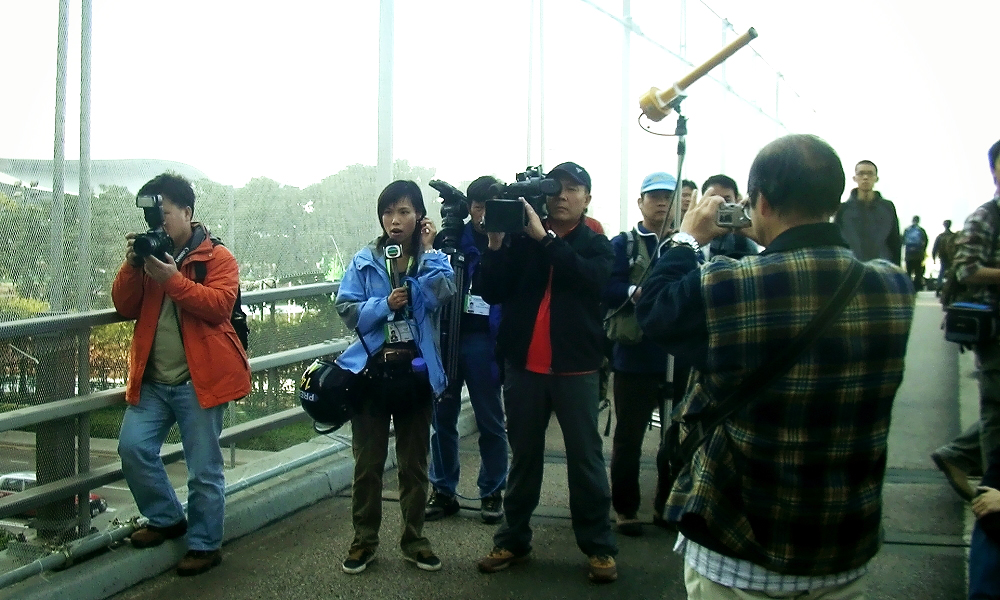
TVB reporter Joyce Fung and the station's photographers, shown covering the 2005 WTO protests in Hong Kong.

On 19 November 1967, TVB premiered its very first 2 News Report programmes, the evening News at 7:30 and Late News/News Roundup (at 10:30 pm). The first news anchors, all male, were David Lee, Josiah Lau, Chu Wai Tak, and Stephen Shiu. On 1 January 1968, the first morning talk and news programme, Morning Assembly, premiered, hosted by the news editor Edward Ho; from 19 April 1976 to 29 April 1977, the show was renamed Morning News Report.

On 16 November 1970, Noon News and News Headlines were also added to TVB Jade's schedule. On 1 November 1976, News at 7:30 was renamed News at 6:30 as the newscast was moved back by one-hour. On 2 January 1978, the first female anchor, Anite Yip, debuted on TVB News.

On 1 January 1980, Cantonese subtitles were introduced. On 19 November 1980, the nightly News at Ten was launched. On 6 September 1981, Good Morning Hong Kong premiered and currently airs from Monday to Saturday. On 3 January 1983, News at 9:30 added subtitles; it was renamed News File in 1985. On 4 January 1988, all news programmes on both TVB Jade and Pearl updated their opening sequences to include the date and headlines.

News File ended on 14 May 1993. On Monday, 2 September 1996, computer subtitling was reintroduced and has remained ever since on all newscasts.

On 21 September 2003, TVB and its news department, along with other divisions moved to TVB City at Tseung Kwan O. On 17 October 2006, subtitles were also included on TVB Pearl. On 13 July 2008, TVB News programmes started broadcasting in 16:9. On 2 February 2009, TVB News programmes started in high definition permanently.

On 30 June 2012, TVB iNews converted from standard definition to high definition. Further modifications were introduced to fit the HDTV screens, and News Titles for iNews were also updated. On 27 August 2012, tvb.com began to include more news, finance, weather, and other information on its website. On 15 November 2012, Weather Report began broadcasting in high definition and with subtitles for the first time. On 1 January 2013, TVB Jade, TVB HD Jade, TVB iNews, and TVB Pearl modified their subtitles to fit high definition. On 20 May 2013, TVB iNews modified its schedules and broadcast news programmes live and in high definition. On 14 July 2013, TVB News updated its opening sequences to make them more realistic. On Sunday, 1 June 2014, TVB News' main news studio was given a major revamp, as well as new titles and subtitles for all of its news programmes. On Monday, 9 June 2014, Good Morning Hong Kong also updated its opening sequences. On 22 February 2016, Putonghua News moved to TVB J5 (later renamed TVB Finance and Information Channel on 20 January 2018) after 26 years on TVB Pearl until it moved back on 13 April 2020.

== Broadcasting and production ==
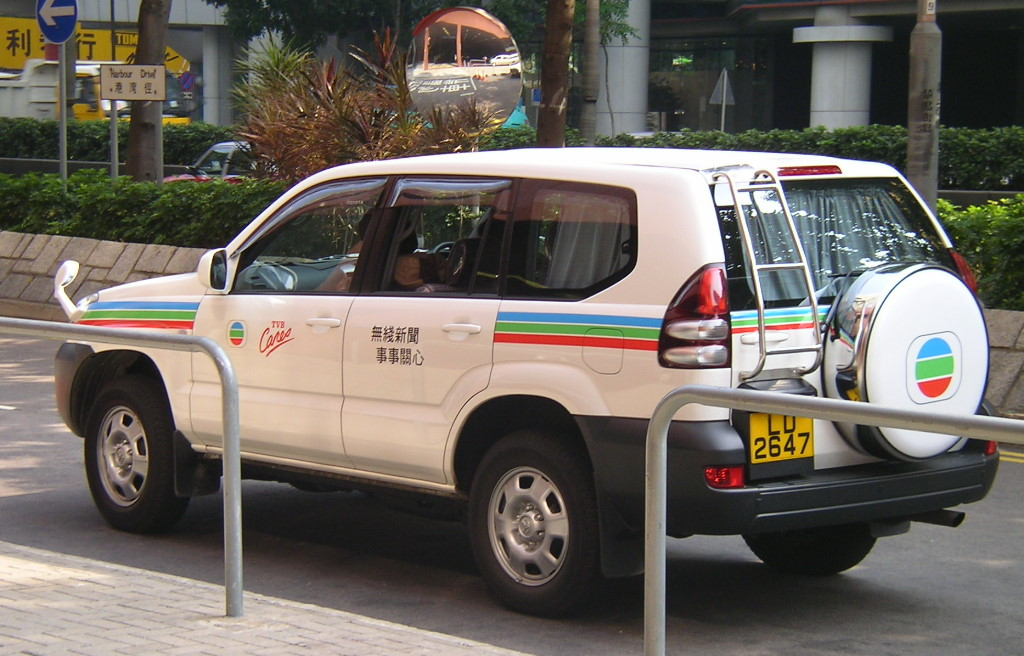
A TVB News vehicle.

TVB's News Time schedules its news anchors monthly, the first news reports, from Monday to Friday and from Saturday to Sunday, don't have anchors. News at 6:30, News at 7, and News at 7:30 have two male and female presenters, Good Morning Hong Kong news and finance two presenters, and other programmes. Except Noon News, Monday to Friday News at 6:30 and News at 7, TVB Jade main news also has sports anchors. TVB iNews's and TVBN's Main News at 8 reports on the Hong Kong Stock Exchange with finance anchors, as well as having sports anchors. On 2 February 2009, TVB News focus changed to News Roundup, which is broadcast every Monday to Friday, by adding special anchors, focus reports, and live broadcasts. In March 2015, Luk Hon-tak, former director-general of the Democratic Alliance for the Betterment and Progress of Hong Kong (DAB), became the managing editor of TVB News in charge of political news stories.

=== Format ===
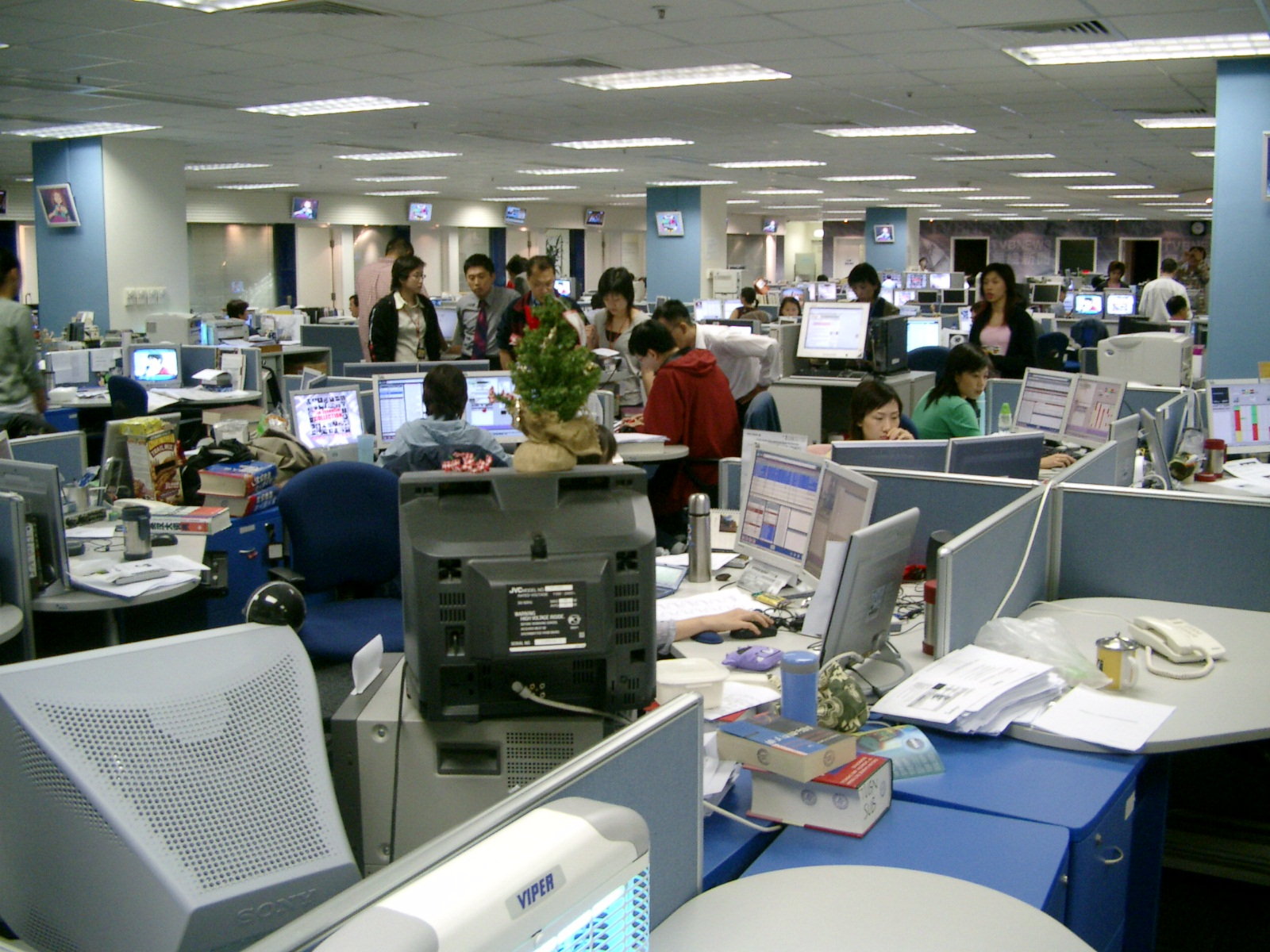
TVB News Centre of Tseung Kwan O.

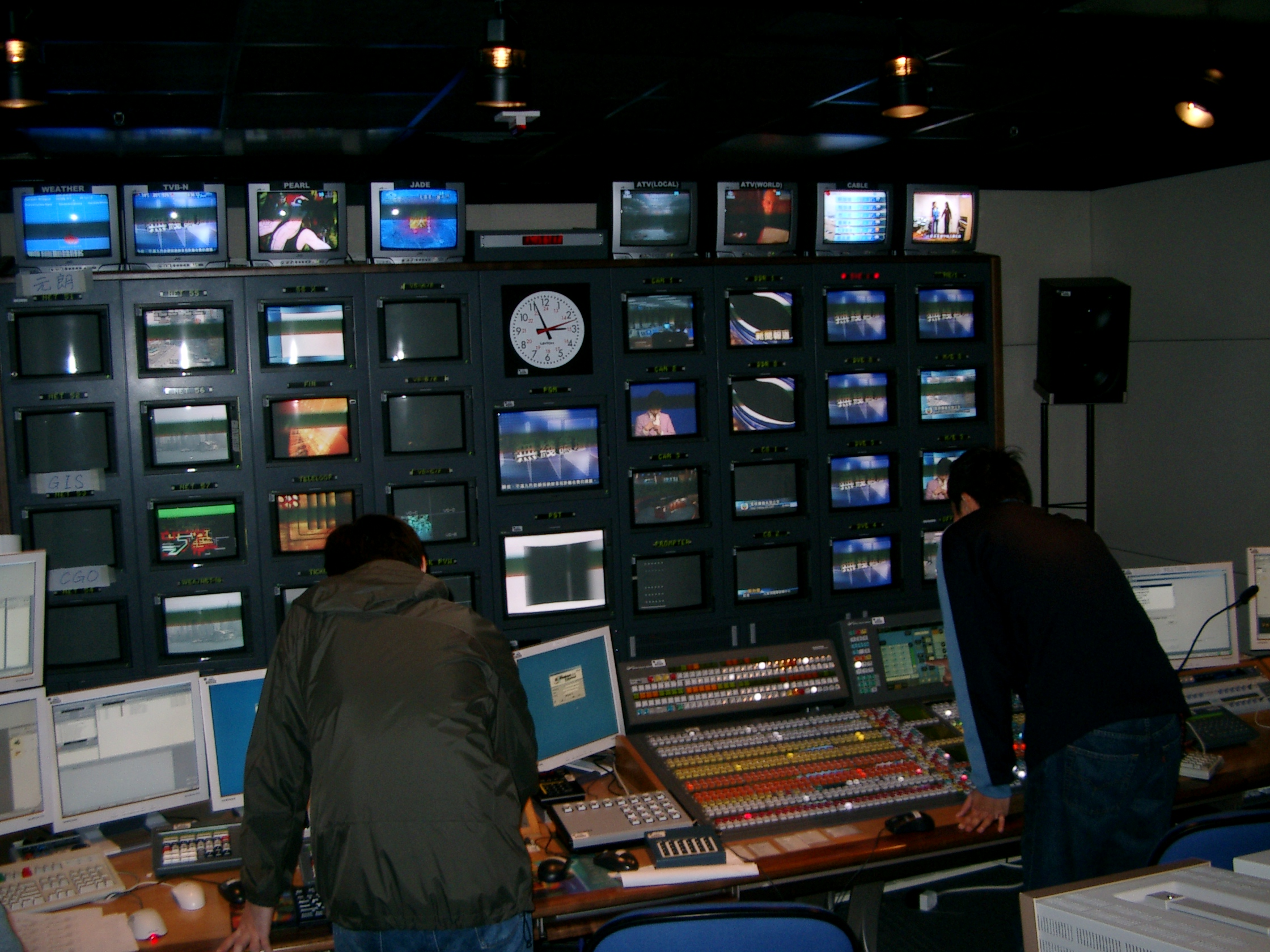
TVB News Control Room.

All newscasts on TVB Jade are in Cantonese; Putonghua Financial Report is in Mandarin. The newscasts on TVB Pearl are in English while the newscasts on TVB Finance & Information Channel are in Mandarin. Good Morning Hong Kong, "Putonghua Financial Report", and other business newscasts are seen on weekdays. Also, programmes have in-vision captions for the hearing impaired, as mandated by local regulations: this was originally only used on the Jade version's News File, 新聞簡報, or on News Daily (TVB Pearl). In the past, both channels aired a 5-minute News File, giving the top headlines of the day and a preview of the News Roundup; it usually aired at various times around 9:00 pm.

The starting sequence of the news features the sound of the Morse code signal for News Today (-· · ·-- ··· - --- -·· ·- -·--), with the pitch at about 1700 Hz.

Standalone weather reports are aired after the News at 6:30 on TVB Jade, the News at 7:30 on TVB Pearl, and Putonghua News on TVB J2. They are famous for Freddy (天氣先生), a cartoon figure that gives the forecast for the next day. The highly stylised and comical format is considered an institution, and is widely recognised by many Hong Kong residents. (The rest of the weather forecast is read by an actual human presenter.)

After the news or weather is presented, Earth Live, which is produced by earthTV, usually follows. However, not all newscasts on TVB Jade are followed by that programme, but will instead return to the previous programme. The only exception is Good Morning Hong Kong, which would air Earth Live first, then immediately start the morning news. Earth Live also airs a couple more times during the morning news programmes.

=== News programmes ===
Investigative reports and extended news stories are often shown on three programmes: Sunday Report (星期日檔案) and News Magazine (新聞透視) on TVB Jade, and The Pearl Report (明珠檔案) on TVB Pearl. Sunday Report and The Pearl Report focus more on stories involving individuals and have a softer approach, while News Magazine focuses more on social problems in general.

=== News channel ===
Additionally, TVB's news department is responsible for the output of the 24-hour news channel TVBN (無綫新聞台), which is carried on the pay TV platform TVB Pay Vision (無綫收費電視) and on iNews (互動新聞台) (from 11 November 2008) on HK Digital TV Broadcast (Channel 83). In June 2006, another news channel, TVBN 2 (無綫新聞2台), was also carried on the pay TV platform TVB Pay Vision.

The transmission of iNews (互動新聞台) was upgraded from SDTV to HDTV video format on 30 June 2012.

== Criticism ==
In media credibility surveys conducted every three years by the Chinese University of Hong Kong (CUHK) since 1997, TVB was consistently rated above average in the "electronic media" category until 2013. Its ratings dropped in 2016 and 2019, when it was ranked last in its group. In CUHK's 2022 survey, its score rose slightly, though it still ranked last in the category.

External videos
- TVB News Footage of Hong Kong Police allegedly beating protestor during the Occupy Central protest, YouTube video

During the 2014 protests, TVB's broadcast of footage of seven police officers beating a protester on 15 October resulted in significant internal conflict during the broadcast. The pre-dawn broadcasts soundtrack which mentioned "punching and kicking" was re-recorded, and later bulletins said that the officers were "suspected of using excessive force". TVB director Keith Yuen questioned on what grounds was the footage saying "officers dragged him to a dark corner, and punched and kicked him". Ho Wing-hong, the assistant supervisor of the news-gathering team responsible for the footage, was immediately demoted to Chief Researcher, a post with only a part-time subordinate. Many journalists expressed their dissatisfaction with the handling of the broadcast, and some 80 TVB staff from all departments objecting to the handling sent a petition to management. After several of its reporters were assaulted by activists attending a pro-Beijing rally, over 340 station employees put their names to a petition condemning the violence. A director of production in the non-drama department ordered all petitioners to a meeting with their supervisors, where the employees were asked to remove their signature or jeopardise their year-end bonuses.

In March 2015, former DAB partisan Luk Hon-tak's appointment as the managing editor of TVB News, in charge of political news stories, caused significant concern within the company. Although news director Keith Yuen maintained that there were no political considerations in Luk's appointment, some TVB News staff questioned the unusual appointment and the political nature of the role. They pointed to Luk's strongly pro-establishment background, as most of the senior management posts were filled by internal promotion. There was an exodus in late February, when at least seven journalists, including Ho Wing-hong, tendered their resignations.

TVB News was criticized for biased coverage during the 2019–20 Hong Kong protests, with the Communications Authority receiving approximately 12,000 complaints. In light of this, some companies, including the Hong Kong branches of Pocari Sweat and Pizza Hut, withdrew their advertisements from TVB, drawing praise from anti-extradition protesters.
