= MyTV Super =

Hong Kong OTT streaming platform operated by TVB

myTV SUPER
- Website type: Streaming television platform
- Available in: Traditional Chinese, English
- Owner: MyTV Super Limited
- Website: www.mytvsuper.com
- Commercial: Yes
- Launched: March 15, 2016; 10 years ago
- Current status: Online

myTV SUPER is a subscription-based over-the-top media service platform established in March 2016 by MyTV Super Limited, a subsidiary of TVB Limited (TVB) in Hong Kong. The platform began testing on March 15, 2016, and was officially launched on April 18, 2016. myTV SUPER is managed by President Cheng Zhe (程哲).

== Overview ==
myTV SUPER provides services through smart TVs, rented or purchased set-top boxes (based on Android 4.X), mobile applications installed on mobile devices (Android and iOS), and web pages. The main services are divided into live broadcast and on-demand viewing. Smart TVs and set-top boxes support 1080P resolution, with some programs even supporting 4K resolution. Mobile devices and web versions support up to 720P resolution, and can also stream favorite programs smoothly.

myTV SUPER's content includes: TVB original programs, original productions, popular dramas and variety shows, movies, Cantonese films, latest Japanese anime, children's programs, live football, horse racing, and high-quality and topical works from around the world. It features many innovative functions, broadcasting over 80 live channels, including TVB's existing 4 free-to-air channels and live channels provided by other operators, of which 50 are free channels. Together with on-demand services, including the latest content, classics, and different categories of topical programs on demand, both provide diverse program content to meet the interests of different audiences. Additionally, viewers can catch up on programs broadcast within the past 3 hours (some channels and platforms can even playback up to 12 hours), allowing customers to watch exciting and rich channels and programs anytime, anywhere. There is also a short video section, including express theater, program and drama highlights, actor interviews, behind-the-scenes footage, etc., to cater to current trends, viewing habits, and patterns. Interactive functions allow audiences to participate more deeply in some segments through live channel formats, such as real-time interaction with hosts, playing games, grabbing gifts, etc., increasing program engagement.

On September 2, 2024, myTV SUPER expanded its coverage to Macau.

== History ==
In February 2017, myTV SUPER launched its web version and can be viewed across screens through the "Multi-View" function on mobile phones, tablets, and websites.

In March 2017, TVB Limited announced that myTV SUPER had reached 3 million users.

On April 17, 2017, the myTV SUPER Supreme Edition was officially launched and open for Hong Kong citizens to subscribe. In addition to the Basic Edition channels, the Supreme Edition added 9 internationally renowned entertainment packages (live and on-demand) and on-demand packages.

On September 1, 2019, myTV SUPER Channel 18 was officially launched on this platform. The channel provides comprehensive Hong Kong horse racing information, including stable news, morning exercise footage, pre-race analysis, live racing, and post-race reviews. myTV SUPER also added a "Horse Racing" section, providing tips, races, predictions, and strategic horse racing information.

On August 10, 2020, myTV SUPER Channel 1 was officially launched on this platform. The channel broadcasts original programs from Monday to Friday evenings, including talk shows, cooking, immigration information, etc., and also reruns some TV dramas and programs previously broadcast on free television channels. This channel ceased broadcasting on June 21, 2021.

On September 2, 2024, myTV SUPER expanded its coverage to Macau.

On May 19, 2025, myTV SUPER launched the free upgrade service "TV 3.0", including: 1) "Scoop" program adds exclusive 3-minute live content after the show two nights a week; 2) myTV SUPER Jetso reward program allows viewers to watch TV, earn stamps, and redeem rewards; 3) 12-hour playback function with new playback shortcuts; 4) New short video section with food, travel, variety shows, and music, over 3,000 selected short videos available for free viewing; 5) myTV SUPER Chat allows viewers to chat while watching TV, play games, and shop easily; 6) Over 50 free live channels, from TVB classics to international blockbusters, pets, travel, nostalgic golden oldies, available for free viewing anytime.

== Programs ==
The following only lists dramas and programs first launched/broadcast on this platform.

=== Original Programs ===
==== Co-production productions ====
Hong Kong-Mainland Co-production Dramas

Upload Date	Program	Notes
June 24 – September 17, 2017	Legal Mavericks	Co-produced by TVB and iQIYI; Broadcast Saturdays and Sundays 21:30-22:30 on TVB Jade; Uploaded simultaneously to iQiyi at 20:00 on the same day
September 18 – October 27, 2017	Line Walker: The Prelude	Co-produced by TVB and Tencent Penguin Pictures; Broadcast Monday to Friday 21:30-22:30 on Jade Channel; Uploaded simultaneously to Tencent Video at 20:00 on the same day
November 27, 2017 – January 19, 2018	Heart and Greed	Co-produced by TVB and Penguin Pictures; Broadcast Monday to Friday 21:30-22:30 on Jade Channel; Uploaded simultaneously to Tencent Video at 20:00 on the same day
May 21 – July 8, 2018	Deep in the Realm of Conscience	Co-produced by TVB and Penguin Pictures; Broadcast Monday to Friday 20:30-21:30 on Jade Channel; Uploaded simultaneously to Tencent Video at 20:00 on the same day
September 10 – October 28, 2018	Another Era	Co-produced by TVB and iQiyi; Broadcast Monday to Friday 21:30-22:30 on Jade Channel; Uploaded simultaneously to iQiyi at 20:00 from August 29; Broadcast on CCTV-8 at 19:30 from the 30th of the same month
December 24, 2018 – February 2, 2019	Guardian Angel	Web series co-produced by Shaw Brothers Studio and iQiyi; Broadcast Monday to Friday 20:30-21:30 on Jade Channel; Changed to Monday to Friday 20:30-21:30, Saturdays 20:30-22:30 on Jade Channel from January 19 to February 2 Uploaded to iQiyi at 20:00 from December 6
April 1 – May 10, 2019	The Defected	Co-produced by TVB and Penguin Pictures; Broadcast Monday to Friday 21:30-22:30 on Jade Channel; Uploaded simultaneously to Tencent Video at 20:00 on the same day Uploaded to Netflix from May 11
May 18 – June 26, 2020	Flying Tiger 2	Web series co-produced by Shaw Brothers and Youku; Broadcast Monday to Friday 21:30-22:30 on Jade Channel; Uploaded to Youku at 20:00 from September 6, 2019
November 9 – December 27, 2020	Line Walker: Bull Fight	Co-produced by TVB and Penguin Pictures; Broadcast Monday to Friday 20:30-21:30 on Jade Channel; From October 12, 2020, uploaded simultaneously to Tencent Video, TVB Anywhere and TVBI overseas partner platforms at 20:00 on Mondays to Wednesdays (Two episodes updated each time)
November 16 – December 24, 2020	Legal Mavericks 2020	Co-produced by TVB and iQiyi; Broadcast Monday to Friday 21:30-22:30 on Jade Channel; From November 2, 2020, uploaded simultaneously to iQiyi, TVB Anywhere and TVBI overseas partner platforms at 20:00 on Mondays to Thursdays (Two episodes updated each time)

=== Microfilms ===
Original Microfilms

Upload Period	Program	Notes
May 28 – June 4, 2016	A Time of Love II	Episode 1 released May 28; Episode 2 released June 4

==== Variety shows ====
Co-production Programs

Upload Period	Program Name	Notes
December 27, 2018 – January 5, 2019	"Get it Beauty On The Road" Hong Kong Edition	Uploaded December 17, December 22, December 29, January 5

Original Programs

Upload Year	Program Name
2020	Coffee, You and Me
2020	Second Home
2020	Gigi's Pot of Love (Season 2)
2020	More Than Mall
2021	Coffee, You and Me 2
2021	Testing Menu
2021	Master's Talk
2021	Doggie Training Camp
2021	SUPER FIVE
2021	Drive U To The Hell

=== Acquired Programs ===
==== Variety Shows ====
Japanese Dramas

Drama First Broadcast Year	Drama	Time Slot	Broadcast Type
2006	Nodame Cantabile	Getsuku	Full Series Released
2008	Nodame Cantabile in Europe	Special	Full Series Released
2015	A Restaurant with Many Problems	Mokuyō Gekijō	Full Series Released
2015	Crazy for Me	Suiju	Full Series Released
2015	Doctor's Affairs	Thursday Theater	Full Series Released
2015	Koinaka	Getsuku	Full Series Released
2015	From Five to Nine	Getsuku	Full Series Released
2016	Funasshi Tantei	Special	Full Series Released
2016	Love That Makes You Cry	Getsuku	Full Series Released
2016	A Girl & Three Sweethearts	Getsuku	Simulcast
2016	300 Million Yen Robbery	Special	Full Series Released
2016	Chef ~Three Star School Lunch~	Thursday Theater	Simulcast
2016	Offbeat Chief Police	Nichi-9	Simulcast

Drama First Broadcast Year	Drama	Time Slot	Broadcast Type
2015	HEAT	Ka-10	Full Series Released
2015	Alert: Keishichō Kinkyu Hatten-han	Ka-10	Full Series Released
2016	Let Me Call You Father-in-law	Ka-10	Full Series Released
2016	Time Taxi	Special	Full Series Released
2016	My Dangerous Wife	Ka-10	Full Series Released
2017	Tomorrow's Promise	Ka-9	Simulcast

Drama First Broadcast Year	Drama	Time Slot	Broadcast Type
2015	The Emperor's Cook	Nichiyō gekijō	Full Series Released
2015	Kounodori: Dr. Stork	Kin-10	Full Series Released
2015	Downtown Rocket	Nichi-9	Full Series Released
2016	Death Cash	Sui-24	Full Series Released
2016	The Man with the God Tongue	Ka-10	Full Series Released
2016	Brass Dreams	Sui-24	Full Series Released
2016	The Full-Time Wife Escapist	Kin-10	Simulcast
2016	Death Cash	Sui-24	Full Series Released
2016	The Man with the God Tongue	Kin-10	Simulcast
2016	Brass Dreams	Nichi-9	Full Series Released
2016	The Full-Time Wife Escapist	Ka-10	Full Series Released
2016	Tower of Sand	Sui-24	Full Series Released
2016	Suna no Tō	Kin-10	Simulcast
2016	IQ246 Kareinaru Jikembo	Nichi-9	Full Series Released
2017	Quartet	Ka-10	Simulcast
2017	Rental no Koi	Sui-24	Full Series Released
2017	Leaders 2	Special	Full Series Released
2017	Anata no Koto wa Sorehodo	Ka-10	Simulcast
2017	Three Dads	Sui-24	Full Series Released
2017	Little Giants	Nichi-9	Full Series Released
2017	Kanna-san!	Ka-10	Simulcast
2017	Kounodori: Dr. Stork	Kin-10	Simulcast
2017	Prison Princess	Ka-10	Full Series Released

Drama First Broadcast Year	Drama	Time Slot	Broadcast Type
2014	Midnight Food Store 3	Ka-25	Full Series Released
2017	Shiawase no Kioku	Special	Full Series Released

Drama First Broadcast Year	Drama	Time Slot	Broadcast Type
2014	Kaseifuwamita!	Special	Full Series Released
2014	Doctor-X: Surgeon Michiko Daimon	Moku-9	Full Series Released
2015	The Brilliant Medical Doctor	Moku-9	Full Series Released
2015	The Brilliant Medical Doctor	Moku-9	Full Series Released
2015	I'm Home	Moku-9	Full Series Released
2015	Emergency Interrogation Room	Special	Full Series Released
2015	Family Fortune War	Moku-9	Full Series Released
2016	Sumikasumire	Kin-11	Full Series Released
2016	Good Partner: Muteki no Bengoshi	Moku-9	Simulcast
2016	The Secret Life of My Secretary	Moku-9	Simulcast
2016	Doctor-X: Surgeon Michiko Daimon Season 4	Moku-9	Simulcast
2017	Shūkatsu Kazoku	Moku-9	Simulcast
2017	Emergency Interrogation Room Season 2	Moku-9	Simulcast
2017	CSI: Crime Scene Talks Season 4	Moku-8	Simulcast
2017	Doctor-X: Surgeon Michiko Daimon Season 5	Moku-9	Simulcast

Drama First Broadcast Year	Drama	Time Slot	Broadcast Type	
2016	The Solitary Gourmet Season 5	Do-24	Simulcast	
2016	The Solitary Gourmet Season 5 Special	Special	Simulcast	
2016	The Solitary Gourmet Miyagi Special	Special	Simulcast	
2017	[[The Solitary Gourmet	Special	Simulcast	The Solitary Gourmet Winter Gourmet Special]]
2017	The Solitary Gourmet Season 6	Do-24	Simulcast	

Drama First Broadcast Year	Drama	Time Slot	Broadcast Type
2013	Gochisōsan	Asadora	Full Series Released
2014	Massan	Asadora	Full Series Released
2015	Mare	Asadora	Full Series Released
2015	BEAUTY AND THE FELLOW	Ka-10	Full Series Released
2015	Asa ga Kita	Asadora	Full Series Released
2016	Moribito	NHK	Full Series Released
2016	Toto Neechan	Asadora	Full Series Released
2016	Moribito: Guardian of the Spirit 2	Saturday drama	Full Series Released

Drama First Broadcast Year	Drama	Time Slot	Broadcast Type
2014	Jimi ni Sugoi!	Do-9	Full Series Released
2014	Hanasaki Mai ga Damattenai	Sui-10	Full Series Released

Drama First Broadcast Year	Drama	Time Slot	Broadcast Type
2016	Okane no Kireme ga Koi no Hajimari	Moku-24	Full Series Released
2016	Doctor Car	Moku-24	Simulcast
2016	The Inheritance Lawyer Shinichi Kakizaki	Moku-24	Simulcast
2016	The Inheritance Lawyer Shinichi Kakizaki Special	Special	Simulcast
2016	10 Women in Black (2016)	Moku-24	Simulcast
2017	Psychic Agents	Moku-24	Simulcast
2017	Amateur Lovers Never Give Up	Moku-24	Simulcast
2017	The Smartphone Guy	Moku-24	Simulcast
2017	Black Revenge	Moku-24	Simulcast

Drama First Broadcast Year	Drama	Time Slot	Broadcast Type
2017	Akira and Akira	Drama W (Sunday)	Simulcast (2 days behind Japan)
2017	Frownland	Drama W (Saturday)	Simulcast (2 days behind Japan)

Korean Dramas

Korean Broadcasting System

Drama First Broadcast Year	Drama	Time Slot	Broadcast Type
2009	Boys Over Flowers	Mon-Tue	Full Series Released
2012	Big	Mon-Tue	Full Series Released
2012	The Innocent Man (South Korean TV series)	Wed-Thu	Full Series Released
2013	You Are the Best!	Weekend	Full Series Released
2013	The Queen of Office	Mon-Tue	Full Series Released
2013	Don't Look Back: The Legend of Orpheus	Mon-Tue	Full Series Released
2013	Good Doctor	Mon-Tue	Full Series Released
2013	Wang's Family	Weekend	Full Series Released
2013	Secret	Wed-Thu	Full Series Released
2013	Marry Him If You Dare	Mon-Tue	Full Series Released
2014	Inspiring Generation	Wed-Thu	Full Series Released
2014	Wonderful Days	Weekend	Full Series Released
2014	Big Man (TV series)	Mon-Tue	Full Series Released
2014	Golden Cross	Wed-Thu	Full Series Released
2014	Two Mothers (TV series)	Daily	Full Series Released
2014	Blade Man	Weekend	Full Series Released
2014	Blade Man	Wed-Thu	Full Series Released
2014	Naeil's Cantabile	Mon-Tue	Full Series Released
2014	The King's Face	Wed-Thu	Full Series Released
2014	Healer	Mon-Tue	Full Series Released
2015	House of Bluebird	Weekend	Full Series Released
2015	Unkind Women	Wed-Thu	Full Series Released
2015	Save the Family	Daily	Full Series Released
2015	The Producers	Fri-Sat	Full Series Released
2015	Assembly	Wed-Thu	Full Series Released
2015	All About My Mom	Weekend	Full Series Released
2015	All Is Well	Daily	Full Series Released
2015	Cheer Up!	Mon-Tue	Full Series Released
2015	Oh My Venus	Mon-Tue	Full Series Released
2016	The Promise (2016 TV series)	Daily	Full Series Released
2016	Five Enough	Weekend	Full Series Released
2016	The Master of Revenge	Wed-Thu	Full Series Released
2016	The Gentlemen of Wolgyesu Tailor Shop	Weekend	Full Series Released
2016	Sweet Stranger and Me	Mon-Tue	Simulcast
2016	First Love Again	Daily	Full Series Released
2017	Ms. Perfect	Mon-Tue	Simulcast
2017	The Happy Loner	Mon-Tue	Simulcast
2017	Fight for My Way	Mon-Tue	Simulcast
2017	Hit the Top	Fri-Sat	Simulcast
2017	Strongest Deliveryman	Fri-Sat	Simulcast
2017	Girls' Generation 1979	Mon-Tue	Simulcast
2017	Witch at Court	Mon-Tue	Simulcast
2017	Go Back	Fri-Sat	Simulcast
2017	Jugglers	Mon-Tue	Simulcast
2018	Radio Romance	Mon-Tue	Simulcast
2018	The Miracle We Met	Mon-Tue	Simulcast

Drama First Broadcast Year	Drama	Time Slot	Broadcast Type
2003	Stairway to Heaven	Wed-Thu	Full Series Released
2008	Temptation of Wife	Daily	Full Series Released
2009	Brilliant Legacy	Weekend Special	Full Series Released
2009	The City Hall	Wed-Thu	Full Series Released
2009	You're Beautiful	Wed-Thu	Full Series Released
2010	Secret Garden	Weekend Special	Full Series Released
2012	Rooftop Prince	Wed-Thu	Full Series Released
2012	Five Fingers	Weekend Special	Full Series Released
2013	The Secret of Birth	Weekend Special	Full Series Released
2013	I Can Hear Your Voice	Wed-Thu	Full Series Released
2013	Empire of Gold	Mon-Tue	Full Series Released
2013	Master's Sun	Wed-Thu	Full Series Released
2013	The Suspicious Housekeeper	Mon-Tue	Full Series Released
2013	The Heirs	Wed-Thu	Full Series Released
2013	My Love from the Star	Wed-Thu	Full Series Released
2014	Three Days	Wed-Thu	Full Series Released
2014	God's Gift: 14 Days	Mon-Tue	Full Series Released
2014	Doctor Stranger	Mon-Tue	Full Series Released
2014	You're All Surrounded	Wed-Thu	Full Series Released
2014	It's Okay, That's Love	Wed-Thu	Full Series Released
2014	My Lovely Girl	Wed-Thu	Full Series Released
2014	Modern Farmer	Weekend	Full Series Released
2014	Birth of a Beauty	Weekend Special	Full Series Released
2014	Pinocchio	Wed-Thu	Full Series Released
2014	Punch	Mon-Tue	Full Series Released
2015	Hyde, Jekyll, Me	Wed-Thu	Full Series Released
2015	Heard It Through the Grapevine	Mon-Tue	Full Series Released
2015	A Girl Who Sees Smells	Wed-Thu	Full Series Released
2015	Mrs. Cop	Mon-Tue	Full Series Released
2015	Yong-pal	Wed-Thu	Full Series Released
2015	Six Flying Dragons	Mon-Tue	Full Series Released
2015	Remember	Wed-Thu	Full Series Released
2016	Mrs. Cop 2	Weekend Special	Simulcast
2016	Entertainer	Wed-Thu	Simulcast
2016	Wanted	Wed-Thu	Simulcast
2016	Second to Last Love	Weekend Special	Simulcast
2016	Don't Dare to Dream	Wed-Thu	Simulcast
2016	Our Gap-soon	Weekend	Full Series Released
2016	The Legend of the Blue Sea	Wed-Thu	Simulcast
2016	The Birth of a Married Woman		Simulcast
2017	Shin Saimdang	Wed-Thu	Simulcast
2017	Super Family 2017	Monday drama	Simulcast
2017	Suspicious Partner	Wed-Thu	Simulcast
2017	Reunited Worlds	Wed-Thu	Simulcast
2017	While You Were Sleeping	Wed-Thu	Simulcast
2017	Judge vs. Judge	Wed-Thu	Simulcast
2018	Return	Wed-Thu	Simulcast
2018	Switch	Wed-Thu	Simulcast

Drama First Broadcast Year	Drama	Time Slot	Broadcast Type	
2006	Princess Hours	Wed-Thu	Full Series Released	
2007	[[Coffee Prince (South Korean TV series)	Coffee Prince]]	Full Series Released	Mon-Tue
2012	Missing You	Wed-Thu	Full Series Released	
2013	7th Grade Civil Servant	Wed-Thu	Full Series Released	
2013	Queen's Classroom	Wed-Thu	Full Series Released	
2013	The Scandal	Weekend Special	Full Series Released	
2013	Goddess of Fire	Mon-Tue	Full Series Released	
2013	Medical Top Team	Wed-Thu	Full Series Released	
2013	Empress Ki	Mon-Tue	Full Series Released	
2013	Golden Rainbow	Weekend Special	Full Series Released	
2013	Miss Korea	Wed-Thu	Full Series Released	
2014	Cunning Single Lady	Wed-Thu	Full Series Released	
2014	Hotel King	Weekend Special	Full Series Released	
2014	A New Leaf	Wed-Thu	Full Series Released	
2014	Triangle	Mon-Tue	Full Series Released	
2014	Diary of a Night Watchman	Mon-Tue	Full Series Released	
2014	4 Legendary Witches	Weekend Special	Full Series Released	
2014	Pride and Prejudice	Mon-Tue	Full Series Released	
2014	Mr. Back	Wed-Thu	Full Series Released	
2015	Kill Me, Heal Me	Wed-Thu	Full Series Released	
2015	Angry Mom	Wed-Thu	Full Series Released	
2015	Splendid Politics	Mon-Tue	Full Series Released	
2015	Warm and Cozy	Wed-Thu	Full Series Released	
2016	My Little Baby	Saturday late-night drama	Full Series Released	
2016	Woman with a Suitcase	Mon-Tue	Simulcast	

Drama First Broadcast Year	Drama	Time Slot	Broadcast Type
2012	Ice Adonis	Morning	Full Series Released
2013	Nine	Mon-Tue	Full Series Released
2013	She is wow!	Wed-Thu	Full Series Released
2013	Dating Agency: Cyrano	Mon-Tue	Full Series Released
2013	Potato Star 2013QR3		Full Series Released
2013	Let's Eat	Wed-Thu	Full Series Released
2014	Emergency Couple	Fri-Sat	Full Series Released
2014	Flower Grandpa Investigation Unit	Friday drama	Full Series Released
2014	High School King of Savvy	Mon-Tue	Full Series Released
2014	Marriage, Not Dating	Fri-Sat	Full Series Released
2014	Misaeng:Incomplete Life	Fri-Sat	Full Series Released
2014	Family Secret	Morning	Full Series Released
2015	Super Daddy Yeol	Fri-Sat	Full Series Released
2015	Let's Eat 2	Mon-Tue	Full Series Released
2015	Ex-Girlfriends' Club	Fri-Sat	Full Series Released
2015	Hidden Identity	Mon-Tue	Full Series Released
2015	Oh My Ghost	Fri-Sat	Full Series Released
2015	Second 20s	Fri-Sat	Full Series Released
2015	Bubble Gum	Mon-Tue	Full Series Released
2016	Signal	Fri-Sat	Full Series Released
2016	Memory	Fri-Sat	Simulcast
2016	Dear My Friends	Fri-Sat	Simulcast
2016	The Good Wife	Fri-Sat	Simulcast
2016	Cinderella with Four Knights	Fri-Sat	Simulcast
2016	The K2	Fri-Sat	Simulcast
2016	Entourage	Fri-Sat	Simulcast
2017	Avengers Social Club	Wed-Thu	Simulcast
2017	Prison Playbook	Wed-Thu	Simulcast
2018	Live	Weekend	Simulcast
2018	Lawless Lawyer	Weekend	Simulcast

Drama First Broadcast Year	Drama	Time Slot	Broadcast Type
2014	Bad Guys	Saturday	Full Series Released
2016	Local Hero	Weekend	Full Series Released
2016	The Vampire Detective	Sunday	Simulcast
2016	Squad 38	Weekend	Simulcast
2017	Meloholic	Mon-Tue	Simulcast
2018	My First Love	Mon-Tue	Simulcast

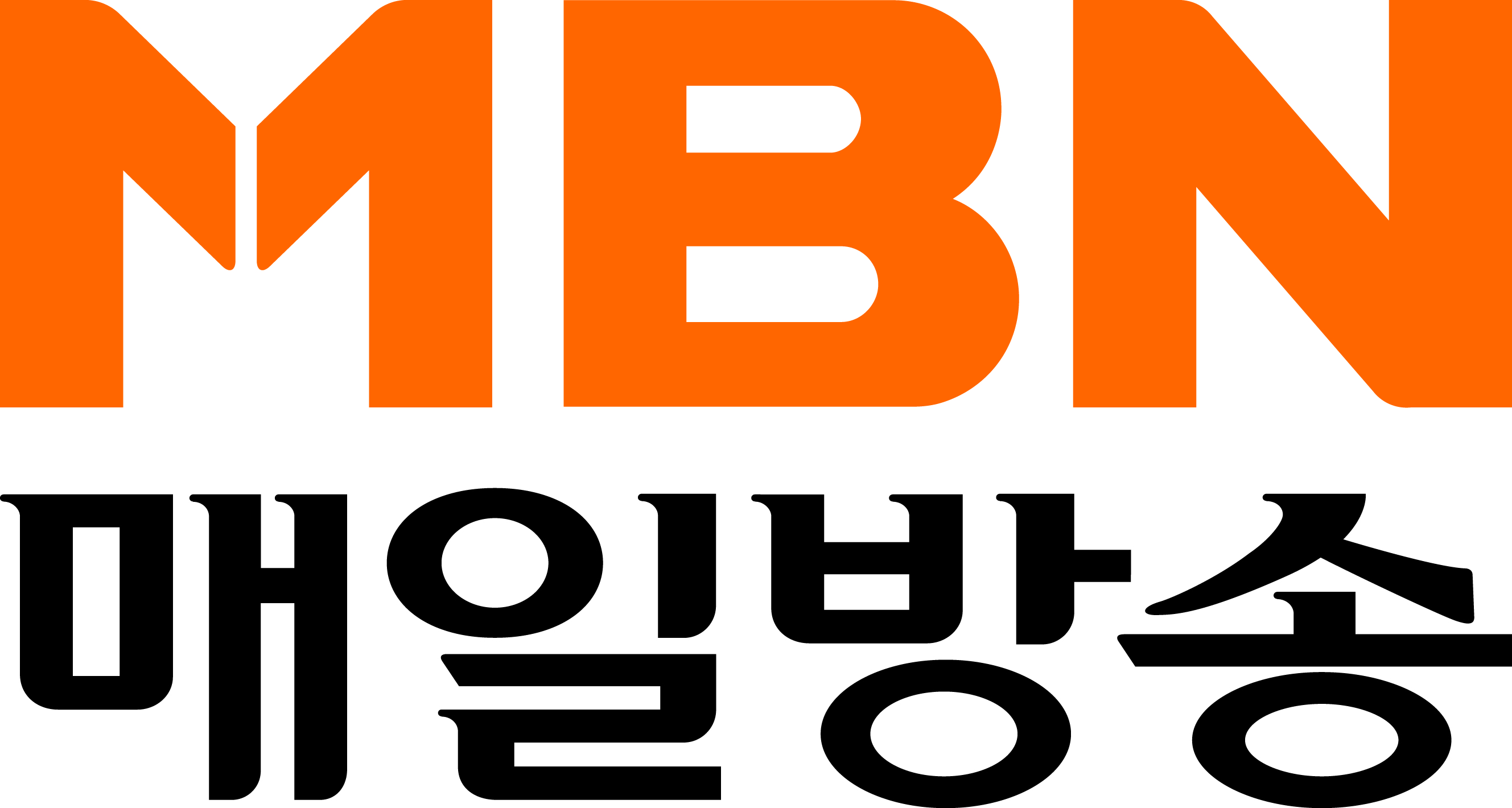

Drama First Broadcast Year	Drama	Time Slot	Broadcast Type
2014	Tears of Heaven (TV series)	Weekend Special	Full Series Released

Drama First Broadcast Year	Drama	Time Slot	Broadcast Type
2014	Bride of the Century	Weekend	Full Series Released

Drama H

Drama First Broadcast Year	Drama	Time Slot	Broadcast Type
2015	You Will Love Me		Full Series Released

DRAMAcube

Drama First Broadcast Year	Drama	Time Slot	Broadcast Type
2014	KARA Secret Love	Friday	Full Series Released

==== Animation ====
Animation

※Time-limited viewing animations not included
Anime Movies

Animation First Broadcast Year	Animation Name	Broadcast Type	Viewing Method
2001	My Life as McDull	Full Series Released	TVB Acquired Programs Package
2004	McDull, Prince de la Bun	Full Series Released	TVB Acquired Programs Package
2012	McDull, The Pork of Music	Full Series Released	TVB Acquired Programs Package
2013	Pokémon: Genesect and the Awakened Mewtwo	Full Series Released	TVB Acquired Programs Package
2013	Hunter × Hunter: Phantom Rouge	Full Series Released	TVB Acquired Programs Package
2014	Pokémon: Diancie and the Cocoon of Destruction	Full Series Released	TVB Acquired Programs Package
2014	Tiger & Bunny: The Strongest Alliance	Full Series Released	TVB Acquired Programs Package
2014	Stand by Me Doraemon	Full Series Released	TVB Acquired Programs Package
2015	Yowamushi Pedal: Full Speed Ahead	Full Series Released	TVB Acquired Programs Package

Animation Series

Animation Name	Broadcast Type	Viewing Method
Pleasant Goat and Big Big Wolf: Wardrobe Adventure	Full Series Released	TVB Acquired Programs Package
Cheeky Monkey	Full Series Released	TVB Acquired Programs Package
Aikatsu! II; Aikatsu! III	Full Series Released	TVB Acquired Programs Package
Jewelpet V Jewelpet VI	Full Series Released	TVB Acquired Programs Package
Pororo (IV); Pororo (V)	Full Series Released	TVB Acquired Programs Package
Peanuts Animation	Full Series Released	TVB Acquired Programs Package
Sgt. Frog	Full Series Released	TVB Acquired Programs Package
Atashin'chi	Full Series Released	TVB Acquired Programs Package
CatChat; CatChat II	Full Series Released	TVB Acquired Programs Package
[[Pikaia! Pikaia! (II)]]	Full Series Released	TVB Acquired Programs Package
DokiDoki! PreCure	Full Series Released	TVB Acquired Programs Package
Pokémon XYZ	Full Series Released	TVB Acquired Programs Package
Kingdom	Full Series Released	TVB Acquired Programs Package
Bob's 3 Brothers	Full Series Released	TVB Acquired Programs Package
PriPara II	Full Series Released	TVB Acquired Programs Package
Nin-Nin	Full Series Released	TVB Acquired Programs Package
Raa Raa the Noisy Lion	Full Series Released	TVB Acquired Programs Package
Jungle Junction (II)	Full Series Released	TVB Acquired Programs Package
Ninjago	Full Series Released	TVB Acquired Programs Package
Turning Mecard (TV series)	Full Series Released	TVB Acquired Programs Package
Rilu Rilu Fairilu	Full Series Released	TVB Acquired Programs Package
DAYS	Full Series Released	TVB Acquired Programs Package
Digimon Adventure: Restart	Full Series Released	TVB Acquired Programs Package
Anpanman	Full Series Released	TVB Acquired Programs Package
Ninja Hattori-kun	Full Series Released	TVB Acquired Programs Package
The Little Farmer Rabby	Full Series Released	TVB Acquired Programs Package
My Little Pony	Full Series Released	TVB Acquired Programs Package
Miffy's World	Full Series Released	TVB Acquired Programs Package
Bodhi and Friends	Full Series Released	TVB Acquired Programs Package
Super4	Full Series Released	TVB Acquired Programs Package
Monchhichi Dream Land	Full Series Released	TVB Acquired Programs Package
Little Cloud and Me	Full Series Released	TVB Acquired Programs Package
Happy Paper Town	Full Series Released	TVB Acquired Programs Package
Talking Tom and Friends	Full Series Released	TVB Acquired Programs Package
Aesop's Fables	Full Series Released	TVB Acquired Programs Package
Baby Steps	Full Series Released	TVB Acquired Programs Package
Flowering Heart; Flowering Heart (II)	Full Series Released	TVB Acquired Programs Package
Magical Circle Guru Guru	Full Series Released	TVB Acquired Programs Package
Mobile Suit Gundam: Iron-Blooded Orphans; Mobile Suit Gundam: Iron-Blooded Orphans (II)	Full Series Released	TVB Acquired Programs Package
The Heroic Legend of Arslan; The Heroic Legend of Arslan II	Full Series Released	TVB Acquired Programs Package
Log Horizon II	Full Series Released	TVB Acquired Programs Package
Sound! Euphonium; Sound! Euphonium II	Full Series Released	TVB Acquired Programs Package
Noragami II	Full Series Released	TVB Acquired Programs Package
Working!!! III	Full Series Released	TVB Acquired Programs Package
Attack on Titan: Junior High	Full Series Released	TVB Acquired Programs Package
Tanaka-kun Is Always Listless	Full Series Released	TVB Acquired Programs Package
Code Geass: Akito the Exiled	Full Series Released	TVB Acquired Programs Package
Attack on Titan 2 Attack on Titan 3	Simulcast	TVB Acquired Programs Package
Cheer Boys!!	Full Series Released	TVB Acquired Programs Package
All Out!!	Full Series Released	TVB Acquired Programs Package
Sound! Euphonium II	Full Series Released	TVB Acquired Programs Package
This Art Club Has a Problem!	Full Series Released	TVB Acquired Programs Package
Yuri on Ice	Full Series Released	TVB Acquired Programs Package
IDOLiSH7	Full Series Released	TVB Acquired Programs Package
School Babysitters	Full Series Released	TVB Acquired Programs Package
The Dragon Dentist	Full Series Released	TVB Acquired Programs Package
How to Keep a Mummy	Full Series Released	TVB Acquired Programs Package

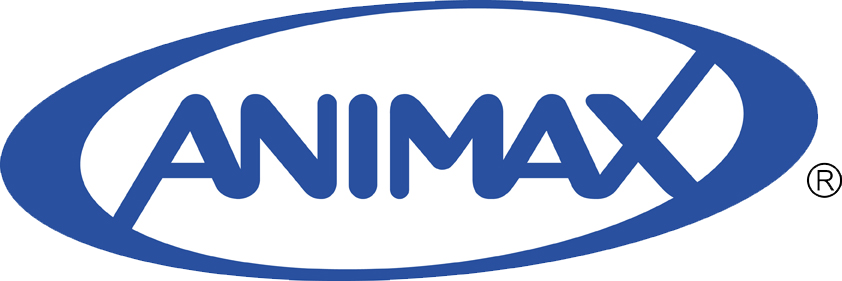

Animation Name	Broadcast Type	Viewing Method
My Youth Romantic Comedy Is Wrong, As I Expected	Full Series Released	Animax On-Demand Section
Tamako Market	Full Series Released	Animax On-Demand Section
The Irregular at Magic High School	Full Series Released	Animax On-Demand Section
Kagerou Project	Full Series Released	Animax On-Demand Section
The Seven Deadly Sins; The Seven Deadly Sins: Signs of Holy War	Full Series Released	Animax On-Demand Section
Parasyte	Full Series Released	Animax On-Demand Section
Young Black Jack	Full Series Released	Animax On-Demand Section
Love, Chunibyo & Other Delusions: Heart Throb	Full Series Released	Animax On-Demand Section
Haven't You Heard? I'm Sakamoto	Full Series Released	Animax On-Demand Section
Chain Chronicle: The Light of Haecceitas	Full Series Released	Animax On-Demand Section
Barakamon	Full Series Released	Animax On-Demand Section

Ani-One

Animation Name	Broadcast Type	Viewing Method
Fullmetal Alchemist FA	Full Series Upload	Ani-One On-Demand Package
Bleach; Bleach Movie: Memories of Nobody	Full Series Upload	Ani-One On-Demand Package
Mobile Suit Gundam Unicorn	Full Series Upload	Ani-One On-Demand Package
New Initial D Movie: Legend 1 - Awakening; New Initial D Movie: Legend 2 - Racer	Full Series Upload	Ani-One On-Demand Package
Soul Eater	Full Series Upload	Ani-One On-Demand Package
Haikyu!! Haikyu!! II; Haikyu!!: Karasuno High School vs Shiratorizawa Academy	First two seasons full upload Season 3 simulcast	Ani-One On-Demand Package
Little Battlers Experience	Full Series Upload	Ani-One On-Demand Package
Inazuma Eleven; Inazuma Eleven the Movie	Full Series Upload	Ani-One On-Demand Package
Buddy Complex	Full Series Upload	Ani-One On-Demand Package
Captain Earth	Full Series Upload	Ani-One On-Demand Package
Gaist Crusher	Full Series Upload	Ani-One On-Demand Package
No Game No Life	Full Series Upload	Ani-One On-Demand Package
Lord Marksman and Vanadis	Full Series Upload	Ani-One On-Demand Package
Unbreakable Machine-Doll	Full Series Upload	Ani-One On-Demand Package
Gourmet Girl Graffiti	Full Series Upload	Ani-One On-Demand Package
Momo Kyun Sword	Full Series Upload	Ani-One On-Demand Package
Fate/kaleid liner Prisma Illya; Fate/kaleid liner Prisma Illya 2wei! Fate/kaleid liner Prisma Illya 2wei Herz! Fate/kaleid liner Prisma Illya 3rei!!	First three seasons full upload Season 4 simulcast	Ani-One On-Demand Package
orange	Simulcast	Ani-One On-Demand Package
91 Days	Simulcast	Ani-One On-Demand Package
Bananya	Simulcast	Ani-One On-Demand Package
Active Raid; Active Raid 2nd	Full series released Season 2 simulcast	Ani-One On-Demand Package
Magic of Stella	Simulcast	Ani-One On-Demand Package
Lostorage incited WIXOSS	Simulcast	Ani-One On-Demand Package
Ao Haru Ride	Full Series Upload	Ani-One On-Demand Package
Battle Spirits	Full Series Upload	Ani-One On-Demand Package
Dragon Collection	Full Series Upload	Ani-One On-Demand Package
Engaged to the Unidentified	Full Series Upload	Ani-One On-Demand Package
Super Lovers; Super Lovers 2	Full series released Season 2 simulcast	Ani-One On-Demand Package
Masamune-kun's Revenge	Simulcast	Ani-One On-Demand Package
Tales of Zestiria the X	Simulcast	Ani-One On-Demand Package
The Saga of Tanya the Evil	Simulcast	Ani-One On-Demand Package
Piacevole!	Simulcast	Ani-One On-Demand Package
Your Lie in April	Full Series Upload	Ani-One On-Demand Package
Starmyu; Starmyu OVA; Starmyu II	Full series upload Season 2 simulcast	Ani-One On-Demand Package
Hinako Note	Simulcast	Ani-One On-Demand Package
One Week Friends	Full Series Upload	Ani-One On-Demand Package
The Fruit of Grisaia	Full Series Upload	Ani-One On-Demand Package
Sekkō Boys	Full Series Upload	Ani-One On-Demand Package
Magical Girl Lyrical Nanoha ViVid	Full Series Upload	Ani-One On-Demand Package
Norn9	Full Series Upload	Ani-One On-Demand Package
Shomin Sample	Full Series Upload	Ani-One On-Demand Package
Fantasista Doll	Full Series Upload	Ani-One On-Demand Package
Please Tell Me! Galko-chan	Full Series Upload	Ani-One On-Demand Package
Danganronpa	Full Series Upload	Ani-One On-Demand Package
My Hero Academia	Full Series Upload	Ani-One On-Demand Package
My First Girlfriend Is a Gal	Simulcast	Ani-One On-Demand Package
Hitorijime My Hero	Simulcast	Ani-One On-Demand Package
[PPAP Lullaby	Simulcast	Ani-One On-Demand Package
Infini-T Force	Simulcast	Ani-One On-Demand Package
Juni Taisen: Zodiac War	Simulcast	Ani-One On-Demand Package
Recovery of an MMO Junkie	Simulcast	Ani-One On-Demand Package
Cardcaptor Sakura: Clear Card	Simulcast	Ani-One On-Demand Package
The Ouka Ninja Scrolls	Simulcast	Ani-One On-Demand Package
Hoshin Engi	Simulcast	Ani-One On-Demand Package
Märchen Mädchen	Simulcast	Ani-One On-Demand Package
Slow Start	Simulcast	Ani-One On-Demand Package
Laid-Back Camp	Simulcast	Ani-One On-Demand Package

== Microfilms ==
To promote myTV SUPER, TVB launched a 14-episode advertising microfilm on May 22, 2016, featuring James Ng playing a laundry shop clerk who encounters different TV program characters and hosts.

Collaborators

- Episode 1: Tracy Chu (Ling Sun-fung from "Over Run Over")
- Episode 2: Bob Lam
- Episode 3: Vincent Wong, Yeung Chiu Hoi, Sunny Dai Yiu Ming (Kwan Ting-ming, Kwan Siu-kei, Kwan Tung-ping from "Over Run Over")
- Episode 4: Bowie Wu, Chung King-fai
- Episode 5: Tyson Chak
- Episode 6: Kenny Wong (Yip Sheung-luk from "The Executioner")
- Episode 7: Mak Ling Ling
- Episode 8: Ben Wong (Marcus Fan Chi-ngai from "Raising the Bar")
- Episode 9: FAMA (from "Do Did Eat")
- Episode 10: Law Lan
- Episode 11: Grace Chan (Sheung-Kun Kam-Ling from "Blue Veins")
- Episode 12: Sammi Cheung, Alycia Chan Pui Man, Ashley Chu Chi Yin (from "Fun Abroad")
- Episode 13: Tony Hung (Cheung Po Tsai from "Captain of Destiny", Yeung Chi-ming from "Angel In-the-Making")
- Episode 14: Anthony Ho Yuen Tung (from "TVB Anniversary Awards" 2014)

== Chronicle ==
=== 2016 ===
- March 15: myTV SUPER launched. All promotional videos were narrated by TVB voice actor Kevin Mak Ho Fung.
- April 17: To promote myTV SUPER, "myTV SUPER Presents: Thousands of Stars See More" was held at Tseung Kwan O Television Broadcast City that evening.
- April 18: TVB Travel Channel (Channel 96) launched, officially joining the basic package.
- May 22: To promote myTV SUPER, the "myTV SUPER Presents: Laundry Shop Celebrity Files" series launched simultaneously on television and online.
- June 26: TVB Radio (Channel 97) launched, officially joining the basic package.
- July 1: RTL CBS Extreme (Channel 301) and RTL CBS Entertainment (Channel 501), AXN (Channel 502), Sony Channel (Channel 503), Animax Asia (Channel 504) launched and were integrated as "RTL CBS Entertainment Package" and "SONY Entertainment Package" under paid subscription model.
- July 17: To promote myTV SUPER, "myTV SUPER Presents: Thousands of Stars Summer Vacation" was held at Tseung Kwan O Television Broadcast City that evening. On the same day, the Ani-One On-Demand Package launched, joining the paid subscription model.
- August 8: beIN SPORTS 1, 2 (Channels 302 and 303) launched, joining single-point paid subscription model with free trial until contract expiration or May 31, 2018.
- November 14: BBC Earth (Channel 401), on-demand range BBC First, BBC Lifestyle (Channel 605), CBeebies (Channel 103), and BBC World News (Channel 709) launched, joining as "BBC Entertainment Information Package" under paid subscription model.

=== 2017 ===
- January 1: Nickelodeon (Channel 104) and Nick Jr. (Channel 105) launched, joining selected basic channels and as "Nick Kids Package" respectively, activating paid subscription model. On the same day, the Basic Edition launched.
- January 16: Thrill (Channel 202), Celestial Movies (Channel 203), and KIX (Channel 304) launched, while "Shaw Brothers Movie On-Demand Package" launched. Other channels joined as "Action Thriller Film Package" under paid subscription model.
- April 1: tvN Asia (Channel 505) launched, joining as "CJ Korean Entertainment Package" under paid subscription model.
- April 17: Supreme Edition launched. In addition to Basic Edition channels, 9 internationally renowned entertainment packages (live and on-demand) and on-demand packages were added. On the same day, free trial viewing was also opened to audiences, with registration from the launch date to May 16.
- June 4 onwards: To celebrate the 20th anniversary of Hong Kong's return to China, "Farewell to the Colony" was placed in the free on-demand zone.
- June 12: TVB Chinese Opera Channel (Channel 98) launched, joining the basic package.
- June 26: myTV SUPER Movie Package launched, joining and integrating into paid subscription model.
- August 15: Interactive News Channel (Channel 83) and J5 (Channel 85) were renamed TVB News Channel and TVB Finance Channel.
- Life Inspired HD ceased broadcasting and transmission on 7 October 2017 due officially Cease.
- BBC Entertainment Information Package joined the Supreme Edition entirely on 1 October 2017, while BBC World News was removed from this package and joined selected basic channels.
- October 31: myTV SUPER and Creation TV held a signing ceremony. On December 31, Creation TV (Channel 602) launched, and myTV SUPER added a Creation TV on-demand zone.
- December 31: beIN SPORTS 1, 2 (Channels 302 and 303) changed their logos.

=== 2018 ===
- January 1: RTL CBS Extreme (Channel 301) and RTL CBS Entertainment (Channel 501) were renamed BLUE ANT Extreme and BLUE ANT Entertainment, while the original "RTL CBS Entertainment Package" was renamed "BLUE ANT Entertainment Package."
- TVB Finance Channel (Channel 85) was rebranded to TVB Finance, Sports & Information Channel on 20 January 2018.
- February 1: Celestial Movies (Channel 203) changed its logo.
- NHK World TV (Channel 707) was rebranded to NHK World-Japan on 1 May 2018.
- Disney Channel (Channel 102) officially joined the basic package on 1 July 2018. Together with Disney Junior (Channel 101), they were open for free viewing until December 31, 2019, or until user contract expiration.
- July 31: Following Now TV's signing with beIN SPORTS on July 12, 2018, obtaining global event broadcasting rights, beIN SPORTS 1, 2 (Channels 302 and 303) ceased broadcasting. TVB was unable to recover sports event broadcasting rights and disbanded the sports team.
- August 15: Due to the disbanding of TVB's sports team and channel adjustments, TVB Sports Channel (Channel 94), Live News Channel (Channel 700), and myTV SUPER Live News Channel (Channel 800) ceased broadcasting.
- September 1: TVB Travel Channel (Channel 96) ceased broadcasting and transmission and merged with Variety Channel (Channel 92) to become Variety Travel Channel.
- September 3: Strategic King TV (Channel 606) launched.
- December 31 at midnight (January 1, 2019, at midnight): Selected Asian Drama Channel (Channel 90) and Jade Catch Up (Channel 95) ceased broadcasting.

=== 2019 ===
- January 15 at midnight (January 16, 2019, at midnight): Following the expiration of Now TV and TVB Network Vision's contract, TVB Classic Channel (Channel 86), Korean Drama Channel (Channel 87), Japanese Drama Channel (Channel 88), Chinese Drama Channel (Channel 89), Variety Travel Channel (Channel 92), Food Channel (Channel 93), TVB Radio (Channel 97), TVB Chinese Opera Channel (Channel 98), and Cantonese Film Channel (Channel 200) changed from TVB logo to myTV SUPER logo. Advertisement time program previews and station identification screens were all cancelled until April 10, 2022.
- March 11: BLUE ANT Extreme changed from (Channel 301) to (Channel 500). On the same day, Love Nature HD (Channel 402) and Love Nature 4K (Channel 403) launched. Love Nature 4K belongs to the Blue Ant Entertainment Package, while Love Nature HD belongs to basic channels.
- April 1: myTV Gold launched. Eurosport (Channel 305), Animal Planet (Channel 404), Discovery Channel (Channel 405), Discovery Science (Channel 406) launched. beIN Sports 1 (Channel 301), beIN Sports 2 (Channel 302), beIN Sports MAX (Channel 303) relaunched. beIN Sports 1, beIN Sports 2, beIN Sports MAX joined the beIN Sports Package. Eurosport, Discovery Channel, Animal Planet, Discovery Science joined the Discovery Channel Package. myTV SUPER Hollywood Movie Package and Gaoshan Movie On-Demand Package joined myTV Gold.
- May 6: Sports2World Channel 1 (Channel 306), Sports2World Channel 2 (Channel 307), Sports2World Channel 3 (Channel 308) launched.
- Sony Channel (Channel 503) officially ceased broadcasting and transmission on 1 June 2019.
- July 20: Honor of Kings Esports (Channel 666) launched.
- September 1: myTV SUPER Channel 18 (Channel 18) launched, free until December 31, 2019.

=== 2020 ===
- February 1: China Movie Channel (Channel 204) launched as a single subscription channel.
- March 24: Honor of Kings Esports (Channel 666) ceased broadcasting.
- April 1: Smithsonian Channel (Channel 407) launched, belonging to the Blue Ant Entertainment Package.
- April 6: Japanese Drama Channel (Channel 88) ceased broadcasting and was replaced by "Asian Drama Channel."
- June 15: myTV SUPER Live Football Channel (Channels 900-906) launched.
- July 1: Sports2World Channels 1-3 (Channels 306-308) ceased broadcasting.
- July 15: Launched myTV SHOPS service. During voice actor Kevin Mak Ho Fung's departure, he continued to work as a freelancer on announcing duties (while adding non-fixed personnel).
- July 27: Asian Drama Channel (Channel 88) and myTV SUPER Live Football Channels 2-7 ceased broadcasting.
- August: myTV SUPER Live Football Channel 2 (Channel 901) launched, belonging to the myTV SUPER Football Package. This package provides live and on-demand services for the Swedish Super League.
- August 10: myTV SUPER Channel 1 (Channel 80) launched.
- September: myTV SUPER Live Football Channel 3 (Channel 902) launched.
- September 19: Ani-One On-Demand Package renamed to Ani-One + Ani-Kids Animation Children's Package.

=== 2021 ===
- June 21: myTV SUPER Channel 1 (Channel 80) ceased broadcasting.
- July 1: Following the launch of Disney+ in Asia, 18 Disney channels in the Asia region and on-demand services ceased broadcasting. Disney Junior (Channel 101), Disney Channel (Channel 102), and the Disney On-Demand Package ceased broadcasting and services on the same day. On the same day, Kids Channel (Channel 100) launched.
- July 31: Three beIN SPORTS channels (301-303) ceased broadcasting again.
- September 1: BLUE ANT Extreme (Channel 500) and BLUE ANT Entertainment (Channel 501) were renamed ROCK Extreme and ROCK Entertainment, while the original "BLUE ANT Entertainment Package" was renamed "ROCK Entertainment Package."
- September 20: Kids Channel renamed to Hands Up Channel.
- October 1: Paramount Network (Channel 205) launched.
- Fox Network Group Will officially ceased broadcasting and transmission on 1 October 2021 however Star World Taiwan and Star Movies Taiwan still remained.
- December 13: myTV SUPER C-Club Package and myTV SUPER K-Club Package ceased services, merged into the acquired program on-demand zone.

=== 2022 ===
- April 11: Food Channel (Channel 93) and TVB Radio (Channel 97) ceased broadcasting. TVB Classic Channel renamed to Millennium Classic Channel. Variety Travel Channel renamed to Asian Variety Channel. Korean Drama Channel (Channel 87) ceased broadcasting and transmission was replaced by "Asian Drama Channel." Millennium Classic Channel, Asian Drama Channel, Chinese Drama Channel, and Asian Variety Channel changed channel logos, restored advertisement time program previews and station identification screens. The Opera Channel and Cantonese Film Channel remained unchanged.
- April 17: Golden Jade Channel (Channel 80) launched. On the same day, to celebrate myTV SUPER's 6th anniversary, the platform opened myTV Gold for free trial viewing, with registration from that day to May 14. Announced the appointment of Ali Lee as the first spokesperson, transforming into S6-BO, launching television commercials and bus body advertisements for promotion on the same day.
- July 7: Smithsonian Channel (Channel 407) changed to Global Trekker.
- September 1: GEM (Channel 503) launched.
- September 5: TVB Finance, Sports & Information Channel (Channel 85) renamed to TVB Finance Sports Information Channel.
- ROCK Extreme was rebranded to ROCK ACTION on 12 December 2022.

=== 2023 ===
- CBeebies (Channel 103), BBC Earth (Channel 401), BBC Lifestyle (Channel 605), and BBC World News (Channel 709) ceased broadcasting and transmission on 1 February 2023 at 23:59 on that day.
- Animal Planet (Channel 404), Discovery Channel (Channel 405) and Discovery Science Channel (Channel 406) ceased broadcasting and transmission on 1 March 2023 at 23:59 on that day.
- April 1: ZooMoo (Channel 101) launched.
- April 10: Asian Variety Channel (Channel 92) ceased broadcasting.
- April 17: SUPER FREE (Channel 1) launched.
- April 18: Dragon TV International Channel (Channel 609) launched. (Upgraded to free broadcast from May 16, 2025.)
- May 8: Golden Chinese Drama Channel (Channel 90) launched.
- June 15: Jade Channel (Ultra HD) - Test Channel (Channel 981) launched.
- July 1: Phoenix Chinese Channel (Channel 610), Phoenix InfoNews Channel (Channel 611), and Phoenix Hong Kong Channel (Channel 612) launched.
- July 17: Hands Up Channel (Channel 100) renamed to SUPER Kids Channel.
- August 1: Jade Channel (Ultra HD) (Channel 81) officially launched.
- Fashion One ceased broadcasting and transmission on 31 August 2023. Replaced by Fashion BOX on 1 September 2023.
- September 29: Paramount Network (Channel 205) ceased broadcasting. ROCK Action (Channel 500) changed channel number to Channel 205.

=== 2024 ===
- April 22: J2 (Channel 82) and TVB Finance Sports Information Channel (Channel 85) merged into TVB Plus, broadcast on Channel 82. As the same free television Channel 85 changed to broadcast Phoenix Hong Kong Channel, which had already launched on myTV SUPER Channel 612, myTV SUPER cancelled Channel 85 and merged it into Channel 612.
- May 1: POPC China Internet Film Channel (Channel 206), CCTV-1 (Hong Kong and Macau Edition) (Channel 606), CGTN Documentary (Channel 607), CGTN English Channel (Channel 608) launched. (With the exception of CCTV-1, which already became free-to-air, CGTN Documentary and CGTN English News Channel are becoming free TV channels from May 16, 2025.)
- GEM ceased broadcasting and transmission on 1 August 2024.
- July 26-August 11: (Channels 800-817) launched.
- September 8: 28AI Smart Horse Racing (Channel 28) launched.

=== 2025 ===
- February 28: Mainland News Channel (Channel 701) ceased broadcasting.
- May 16: SUPER 獎門人 (Super Trio series) (Channel 2), SUPER EYT (Enjoy Yourself Tonight) (Channel 3), SUPER 識食 (Channel 4), SUPER 識嘆 (Channel 5), SUPER Music (Channel 6), SUPER 金曲 (Channel 7), SUPER 煲劇 (Channel 8), SUPER 劇埸 (Channel 9), SUPER 話當年 (Channel 10), SUPER Sports (Channel 11), Action Hollywood Movies (Channel 207), Rialto Classic Movies (RCM) (Channel 208), Trace Sport Stars (Channel 305), Pet Club TV (Channel 408), Globetrotter (Channel 409), Docsville (Channel 410), Pulse Documentaries (Channel 411), CCTV-4 (Channel 613), CCTV-15 (Channel 614), CCTV-11 (Overseas) (Channel 615), Yunnan Lancang-Mekong International Satellite TV (Channel 616), Anhui Satellite TV International Channel (Channel 617), Beijing Television International Channel (Channel 618), Guangxi Television International Channel (Channel 619), Fujian Southeast Satellite TV International Channel (Channel 620), Hunan Television International Channel (Channel 621), Jiangsu Television International Channel (Channel 622), Greater Bay Area Satellite TV (Channel 623), Zhejiang Television International Channel (Channel 624), Shenzhen Satellite TV International Channel (Channel 625), Now 70s (Channel 626), Now 80s (Channel 627), Now Rock (Channel 628), Now 90s & 00s (Channel 629), Concerto (Channel 630), TRACE Urban (Channel 631), and NewsWorld (Channel 709) launched.
- August 11: SUPER 劇埸 changed to SUPER 單元劇 (Channel 9), SUPER 話當年 changed to SUPER 真情SUPER煲 (A Kindred Spirit) (Channel 10).
- December 22: SUPER EYT changed to 觀眾票選-追劇馬拉松 (Channel 3).
- Guangxi Television International Channel ceased broadcasting and transmission on 31 December 2021 and together MTV Live ceased broadcasting.

== Free live channels ==
頻道號碼	頻道名稱
1	SUPER FREE
2	SUPER獎門人
3	觀眾票選-追劇馬拉松
4	SUPER識食
5	SUPER識嘆
6	SUPER Music
7	SUPER金曲
8	SUPER煲劇
9	SUPER 單元劇
10	SUPER 真情SUPER煲
11	SUPER Sports
28	28AI智慧賽馬
80	Golden Jade
81	TVB Jade
82	TVB Plus
83	TVB News Channel
84	TVB Pearl
91	Entertainment News
207	Action Hollywood Movies
208	Rialto Classic Movies(RCM)
305	Trace Sport Stars
408	Pet Club TV
409	Globetrotter
410	Docsville
411	Pulse Documentaries
602	Creation TV
606	CCTV-1
607	CGTN Documentary
608	CGTN (TV channel)
609	東方衛視國際頻道
610	Phoenix Chinese Channel
611	Phoenix InfoNews Channel
612	Phoenix Hong Kong Channel
613	CCTV-4
614	CCTV-15
615	CCTV-Opera
616	Yunnan Lancang-Mekong International Channel
617	安徽廣播電視台國際頻道
618	BRTV International Channel
620	Cross-Strait Television
621	Hunan TV World
622	JSBC International
623	GRT Greater Bay Area TV
624	浙江電視台國際頻道
625	Shenzhen Satellite TV
626	Now 70s
627	Now 80s
628	Now Rock
629	Now 90s & 00s
630	Concerto
631	TRACE Urban
709	NewsWorld

== Channel list ==
=== Ceased/Temporarily ceased/Soon to cease channels ===
(Detailed table omitted for brevity)

Note: Channels marked with * are free-to-view channels.

== Live Sports Channel Cantonese commentators ==
- Chung Chi-kwong
- Tony Chui Kam Tong
- Simon Kong
- Poon Man Tik
- Lee Wai Man
- Wong Yiu Fu
- Fan Chun Yip
- Liang Man Hung
- Leung Kwok Shing
- Chui Ka Nok

== Controversies ==
=== Computer version restrictions ===
When the myTV SUPER web version was launched in February 2017, it only supported Internet Explorer 11.0 or above and Safari 8.0 or above browsers. Other mainstream browsers (including Microsoft Edge, Google Chrome, Firefox, Opera) were not supported. Later, in April 2017, support was added for Microsoft Edge and Google Chrome. This version's defects also included device usage count issues: even when the same device uses the service with a single IP address, when cookies are reset or the operating system is reinstalled, related web warnings may appear preventing login.

=== Ads ===
When myTV SUPER launched in March 2016, it boasted no advertisements, but several months after the service launched, different types of advertisements began appearing. In addition to numerous banner ads on the interface, video ads began appearing before or during video on demand programs. The number even increased from one to four consecutive ads at one point. There were many related complaints on its Facebook page, almost no different from watching television channels.

From the second half of 2017 onwards, "U-shaped" (set-top box) or "L-shaped" (app version) advertisements began appearing during video playback, briefly shrinking the video screen with ads appearing on the extra black borders. During such ads, videos cannot be paused or stopped, nor can full-screen playback mode be exited. The set-top box version also displays ads when switching live channels or after fast-forwarding or rewinding.

From April 2021, TVB added anti-ad blocker mechanisms to the myTV SUPER web version's video player. When it detects that the user's browser has such plugins enabled, videos will not play and will prompt users to disable the plugins to ensure smooth video playback.

Additionally, when customers apply to use the service, they agree to TVB handing over personal data to advertisers. Users' email inboxes may receive different advertisements in the future.

=== Reduced free version features ===
Compared to myTV, the free version of myTV SUPER has even more restrictions. In addition to forcing users to register as members with mobile phone, name, and other personal data instead of using it without logging in, whereas myTV previously provided full replays of most TVB programs and retained them for 60 days, including previously uploaded programs, from April 17, 2017, all programs in the free version (including "News File," one of the few programs retained for over 60 days) are now retained for a maximum of 7 days only, and only a small number of programs are available for replay, effectively forcing users to apply for paid services.

=== Disputes with third-party websites ===
The adult website "myAVSUPER" was suspected of commercial derivative work and faced legal response from TVB. TVB stated that myAVSUPER's website trademark and domain name both resemble TVB's registered "myTVSUPER" trademark and domain name. "myAVSUPER" responded that domain name registration uses a first-come, first-served method, the accusation has no basis, and "myAVSUPER's" global website traffic ranking is higher than myTVSuper. Another earlier famous commercial derivative work media company TVMost has not been reported to have related copyright disputes.

=== The Full-Time Wife Escapist New Year Special cancelled last minute ===
TVB had long purchased the Hong Kong broadcasting rights to TBS Television dramas from Japan and had previously broadcast the Japanese drama The Full-Time Wife Escapist. TVB once planned to upload The Full-Time Wife Escapist 2021 New Year Special (SP) to MyTV SUPER on January 6, 2021 (the special itself aired in Japan on January 2, 2021). TVB officially had also placed the special's promotional banner on the on-demand platform.

However, part of the special had realistic plot content about the COVID-19 pandemic. The drama used real TBS news footage, describing several key moments during the early pandemic period, including early pandemic coverage where Japanese news reported "The 'novel coronavirus' appeared in Wuhan, China. Currently, there are no drugs or vaccines against this virus. There have been multiple confirmed cases nationwide, and the number of patients and deaths may increase in the future." Shortly after these lines were reported by the media, TVB cancelled the program upload at the last minute and removed the promotional banner from the myTV SUPER official website. This move led to reports in multiple newspaper entertainment sections.

== TVB Anywhere ==
TVB Anywhere is a subscription-based OTT service platform of TVB Limited, officially launched in Europe and Australia in April 2014 or February 1, 2015, and globally on September 15, 2016. It is equivalent to the overseas version of myTV SUPER, allowing viewers to watch over 50 channels on television, digital media players, and smartphones, and replay TVB programs. Similar services by the same company include encore TVB.

Main user markets include Macau, Australia, United Kingdom, Europe, Canada, and New Zealand. Independent versions for Singapore and Vietnam were launched in 2019. Malaysia service launched in 2020.

Canadian regional service was transferred to TVBAnywhere+ North America on September 1, 2021. This new service platform is operated by a subsidiary wholly owned by TVBUSA in the North American market.

Macau regional service was upgraded to myTV SUPER on September 2, 2024, and ceased service to the Macau region from November 1, 2024.

Thailand cooperates with MVTV, with services provided by MVHUB+.

TVB Anywhere is currently not available in mainland China, Hong Kong, Macau, United States, and Canada (TVBAnywhere+ North America).

=== Ceased broadcasting ===
- TVB Jade Channel
- TVB Premium Drama Channel
- TVB Premium Lifestyle Channel
- TVB Knowledge Channel
- Tianjin Television International Channel
- TVB8
- Star Chinese Movies
- SCTV 1
- SCTV 7
- SCTV 9
- SCTV 14
- Mandarin Jade Channel
- TVB Radio
- TVB News Channel
- Sichuan International Channel
- Shandong Radio and Television International Channel
- KBS World
- Guangdong International Channel
- TVB Finance Sports Information Channel (Overseas Edition)

== See also ==
- Big Big Channel
- TVB
- HK Television Entertainment - Viu
