= List of Wax and Wane characters =

Wax and Wane is a Hong Kong television drama produced by Television Broadcasts Limited (TVB). The story follows the lives of two rival families in the Chinese noodles business.

== Man Family ==
Cast	Role	Description	Age
Lily Leung	Man Fa-tung 萬花彤	Man Wing-cheong and Yung Shing-fun's aunt Man Kar-fung, Man Kar-fu, Ho Kar-moon, Yung Yee-chun, Yung Yee-lam, Yung Yee-hang's grandaunt	
Chow Chung	Man Wing-cheong 萬永昌	Man Kee Noodles owner Man Fa-tung's nephew Man Suk-kuen's brother Man Ka-fung and Man Ka-fu's father Yung Shing-fun's cousin Ho Kar-moon's uncle Lai Pak-hei's godfather	75
Sunny Chan	Man Kar-fung 萬家豐	Man Kee Noodles owner Man Cheong Shing Noodles Manager; Man Fa-tung's grandnephew Man Wing-cheong's son Man Kar-fu's brother Ko Wai-ting's husband Yung Shing-fun's secondcousin Yung Yee-chun's cousin and enemy Yung Yee-lam, Yung Yee-hang, Ho Kar-moon's cousin	40
Florence Kwok	Ko Wai-ting 高慧婷	Man Kar-fung's wife Yung Yee-chun's ex-girlfriend	38
Kate Tsui	Man Kar-fu, Peace 萬家富	Cuisine magazine writer Man Cheong Shing Noodles Corporate Affairs Deputy Manager; Man Fa-tung's grandniece Man Wing-cheong's daughter Man Kar-fung's sister Yung Shing-fun's secondcousin Yung Yee-hang's cousin and girlfriend Yung Yee-chun, Yung Yee-lam and Ho Kar-moon's cousin	27
Toby Leung	Ho Kar-moon 何家滿	A noodle cook Yung Shing-fun and Man Suk-fun's daughter Man Fa-tung's grandniece Man Wing-cheong's niece Man Kar-fung, Man Kar-fu's cousin Yung Yee-chun, Yung Yee-lam, Yung Yee-hang, Yung Yee-long's cousin, de facto half-sister Loved Lai Pak-hei, later Lai Pak-hei's girlfriend	25
Him Law	Lai Pak-hei, Roy 黎柏熙	A solicitor Man Wing-cheong's godson Ho Kar-moon's love interest, later Ho Kar-moon's boyfriend	25

== Yung Family ==
Cast	Role	Description	Age
Teresa Ha	Lee Kiu 李嬌	Annie Kwong Lai-ying's mother Foster Yung Shing-fun's mother-in-law Eugene Yung, Maggie Yung and Gary Yung's grandmother	
Lau Siu-ming	Yung Shing-fun, Foster 翁盛芬	Man Cheong Shing Noodles Chairman; Man Fa-tung's nephew Lee Kiu's son-in-law Annie Kwong Lai-ying's husband Eugene Yung, Maggie Yung, Gary Yung, Ho Ka-moon and Yung Yee-long's father Man Wing-cheong's cousin Man Yee-chun, Man Kar-fu's seconduncle Wong Sau-ping's lover (Semi-villain)	70
Manna Chan	Kwong Lai-ying, Annie 鄺麗盈	Lee Kiu's daughter Foster Yung Shing-fun's wife Eugene Yung, Maggie Yung and Gary Yung's mother	
Claire Yiu	Wong Sau-ping 王秀萍	Lee Kiu's daughter Yung Shing-fun's mistress, de facto Yung Yee-long's mother Eugene Yung, Maggie Yung and Gary Yung's stepmother (Main villain)	34
Roger Kwok	Yung Yee-chun, Eugene 翁以進	Man Cheong Shing Noodles CEO; Lee Kiu's grandson Man Fa-tung's grandnephew Yung Shing-fun and Kwong Lai-ying's son Wong Sau-ping's stepson Yung Yee-lam and Yung Yee-hang's brother Yung Yee-long's half-brother Man Wing-cheong's secondcousin Man Kar-fung's cousin and enemy Man Kar-fu's cousin Ho Kar-moon's cousin, de facto half-brother Ko Wai-ting's ex-boyfriend Loved Man Ka-fu)	40
Irene Wong	Yung Yee-lam, Maggie 翁以琳	Lee Kiu's granddaughter Man Fa-tung's grandniece Yung Shing-fun and Kwong Lai-ying's daughter Wong Sau-ping's stepdaughter Yung Yee-chun and Yung Yee-hang's sister Yung Yee-long's half-sister Man Wing-cheong's secondcousin Man Kar-fung, Man Kar-fu's cousin Ho Kar-moon's cousin, de facto half-sister Martin's wife (Semi-villain)	
Brian Wong	Fai (Martin)	Yung Yee-lam's husband Yung Shing-fun and Kwong Lai-ying's son-in-law Eugene and Gary's brother-in-law	
Ron Ng	Yung Yee-hang, Gary 翁以行	Man Cheong Shing Noodles Deputy CEO and Corporate Affairs Director; Lee Kiu's grandson Man Fa-tung's grandnephew Yung Shing-fun and Kwong Lai-ying's son Wong Sau-ping's stepson Yung Yee-chun and Yung Yee-lam's brother Yung Yee-long's half brother Man Wing-cheong's secondcousin Man Kar-fung's cousin Ho Ka-moon's cousin, de facto half-brother Man Kar-fu's cousin and boyfriend	28
Leung Cheuk-hin	Yung Yee-long 翁以朗	Yung Shing-fun and Wong Sau-ping's son Yung Yee-chun, Yung Yee-lam, Yung Yee-hang, Ho Ka-moon's half-brother	

== Chan Family ==
Cast	Role	Description	Age
Benz Hui	Chan Yat-chung 陳一忠	Man Cheong Shing Noodles Chairman private assistant Chan Chik-man's father	56
Oscar Leung	Chan Chik-man 陳積文	Man Cheong Shing Noodles Quality Control Team Lead; Chan Yat-chung's son Loved Ho Kar-moon	25

== Wong Family ==
Cast	Role	Description	Age
Derek Kwok	Wong Hung 王洪	Man Cheong Shing Noodles Production Deputy Manager; Wong Sau-ping's brother, de facto lover Yung Yee-long's uncle, de facto father Used Man Ka-fung, Yung Yee-hang, Ho Ka-moon (Main villain)	36
Claire Yiu	Wong Sau-ping 王秀萍	Wong Hung's sister, de facto mistress Yung Shing-fun's mistress, later wife Yung Yee-long's mother (Main villain)	

== Other casts ==
Cast	Role	Description
Wong Ching	Wah Chung-tai 華忠泰	Wah Fuk Properties chairman Wah Hoi-lei's father
Becky Lee	Wah Hoi-lei, Zita 華凱莉	Wah Chung-tai's daughter Man Ka-fu's friend Yung Yee-chun's girlfriend
June Chan	Nancy	Yung Yee-chun's ex-girlfriend
Chung Chi-kwong	Lee Leung 李亮	Man Cheong Shing Noodles Production Supervisor; Man Ka-fung's subordinate

== See also ==
- Wax and Wane
- List of Wax and Wane episodes
