= Roy Tsui =

Hong Kong lyricist

Lam Yat Hey
- 徐家豪
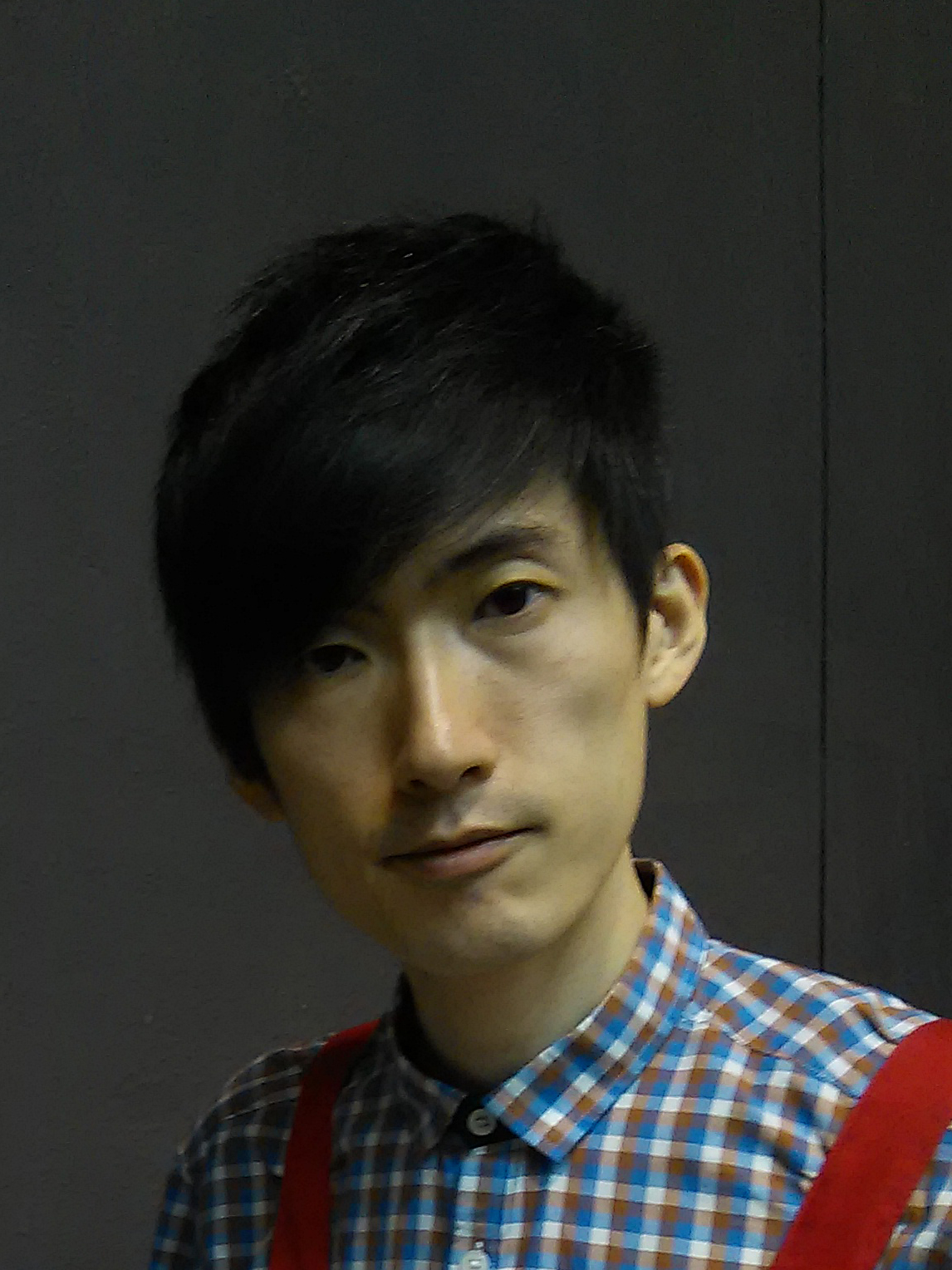
- Born: Tsui Ka Ho 徐家豪; 30 September 1980 (age 46)
- Employer: Most Kwai Chung
- Spouse: Dejay Choi Ming-Lai (m. 2010)

Tsui Ka Ho (Chinese: 徐家豪; born 30 September 1980), better known by his pen name Lam Yat-heiy (Chinese: 林日曦) or Roy Tsui, is a Hong Kong lyricist, who has composed over 80 pieces of lyrics since 2007. He is also a writer and the founder of Blackpaper Limited (Chinese: 黑紙有限公司), a local publisher involved in multimedia creation and advertising campaigns. Multiple business and media channels are owned by Tsui under Blackpaper Limited, including Whitepaper Publishing (Chinese: 白卷出版社), periodical magazine Blackpaper (Chinese: 黑紙), satirical weekly magazine 100 Most (Chinese: 100毛) and multimedia platform TVMost (Chinese: 毛記電視).

Tsui is also the author of columns for several papers, including the Mingpao Weekly and the Oriental Daily News.

== Biography ==
Tsui was born in Hong Kong and grew up in a public housing estate in Tai Wo Hau with his parents, grandparents, and aunt. He changed schools numerous times due to his poor academic record and conduct. After secondary school, he took a 3-year graphic design course at IVE, but he later dropped out and did not pursue further higher education.

In 2003, Tsui joined Commercial Radio Hong Kong as a sound editor and later became the coordinator of their online forums, which Tsui convinced his boss & upper management to keep open. Tsui also allowed his boss, Yu, to see some lyrics he had been composing. Yu requested that Tsui compose 10 more sets of lyrics, which changed Tsui's career path from clerk to production staff. He recommended himself to be on the backstage design team for CR1 (FM 88.1–89.5) 電台雷霆881 and CR2 (FM 90.3–92.1) 叱吒903.

Tsui then changed jobs every few months between the ages of 23 and 31. He was also creative director at Skyhigh Creative Partners. He quit in 2012, as he doubted his mentorship.

In 2007, Tsui composed the lyrics to the theme song "Gulugulu" for the movie Tokyo Tower: Mom and Me, and Sometimes Dad. This is considered his first signature piece. The song entered the Ultimate Song Chart in the same year.

In 2009, Tsui founded the creative unit "Black Paper" with Ah Bu and Chan Keung. He then started working on different creative projects, like publishing magazines, directing music videos, and graphic design.

Tsui published the one-page magazine Black Paper in January 2010. His career as a columnist at the Ming Pao Weekly and RoadShow, City Magazine newspapers, Oriental Daily News and Hong Kong Economic Times began in 2011. A year later, he published his first book, Idiot (《白痴》). In March 2013, he published the magazine 100 Most, which reached the break-even point within half a year. Tsui also founded White Paper Publishing in 2013, focusing on publishing popular culture titles including fiction, prose, and picture books. In the same year, he published his second book, Green Veins (《青筋》), and published Black Face (《黑面》) a year later. He later published his first fiction novel, Happy Never After (《快樂有限》), then Excessively Romantic (《肉麻》), and then published Grey Eurasian Collared (《灰鳩》) in 2015. In 2015, Tsui and his team also created the TV website, TVMost.

== Works ==
=== Lyrics ===
==== 2007 ====
- Freeze – Stepping on the wire ('踩鋼綫')
- Freeze – Maria
- Terence Chi Iong CHUI(小肥) – Time Machines ('時光機')
- Arumimihifumi(有耳非文) – gulugulu (（東京鐵塔下）'gulugulu')
- Arumimihifumi(有耳非文) – Last day Today ('最後今天（月亮版）')

==== 2008 ====
- At17 – The Date to the Moon ('那天約你上太空')
- I Love You Boyz、HotCha – Let's Play La La La ('火熱悶棍La La La')
- Square – ASAP
- Rannes Man (文恩澄) – Entertainment('娛人娛己')
- Arumimihifumi (有耳非文) – Sleepless Actress ('不眠優伶')
- Eunix Lee (李卓庭) – One on One('人釘人')
- Eric Suen (孫耀威) – Story of seven million ('七百萬人的故事')
- Justin(側田) – Cloud ('雲')
- Miriam Yeung(楊千嬅) – La La Kua La La ('啦啦跨啦啦')
- Lowell Lo Feat. Farmer (盧冠廷 Feat. 農夫) – 2050

==== 2009 ====
- Alex Fong (方力申) – Rush ('匆匆')
- Alex Fong (方力申) – Butterfly Flies ('撲翼蝴蝶')
- Jonathan Wong Chee Hynn (王梓軒) – Roswell ('羅茲威爾')
- Jonathan Wong Chee Hynn (王梓軒) – In the Dark ('摸黑')
- Jonathan Wong Chee Hynn (王梓軒) – North South Pole ('南北極')
- Jonathan Wong Chee Hynn (王梓軒) – 1+1
- Jonathan Wong Chee Hynn (王梓軒) – 300 Love Poems ('情詩三百首')
- Elanne Kwong(江若琳) – Next, Please ('有請下位')
- Sukie Tong (唐素琪) – Clear ('清空')
- Janet Yung (翁瑋盈) – Plan A ('A計畫')
- Keeva Mak (麥家瑜) – Detective ('神探')
- Kearen Pang (彭秀慧) – Goodbye
- Kearen Pang 彭秀慧) – Under the Moon ('月球下的人')
- Cilla Kung (樂瞳) – Smiling Fish ('微笑的魚')
- Cilla Kung (樂瞳) – Countdown of Death ('死亡倒數')
- (李昊嘉、黃貫中、叱咤903 DJ) – The Great Teacher ('萬歲師表')

==== 2010 ====
- ToNick – T.O.N.I.C.K
- Jonathan Wong Chee Hynn (王梓軒) – East West ('東西')
- Fainche Che (車盈霏) – Trophy ('戰利品')
- Fainche Che (車盈霏) – The Weather Girl ('天氣女郎')
- Edison Chan (陳冠希) – Love in this World ('問世上有幾多愛')
- Jason Chan (陳柏宇) – Don't let it stop before sun rise ('日出前讓愛戀延續')
- Bosco Wong (黃宗澤) – The Master ('一代宗師')
- Bosco Wong( 黃宗澤) – Over the hills ('越過高山越過谷')
- Cilla Kung (樂瞳 ) – Snowman ('雪人')
- Cilla Kung (樂瞳 ) – Human Figure ('空氣人形')
- Cilla Kung (樂瞳 ) – Christmas Nobody ('聖誕路人')
- Cilla Kung Feat. Luk Wing Kuen@Farmer (樂瞳 Feat. 陸永@農夫 ) – Queen of himono-onna ('乾物女皇')

==== 2011 ====
- HotCha – Not Used To ('未習慣')
- ToNick – Day Dream ('發你個夢')
- Taichi (太極) – Alcohol this morning ('今朝有酒')
- Yu Kiu, Ava (羽翹) – The Gorgeous-ist ('大華麗家')
- Det Dik (狄易達) – Out of City ('無城')
- Mag Lam, Sheldon Lo, James Ng Yip Kwan, Stephanie Ho Ngan Si, Alfred Hui, Ryan Lam (林欣彤、羅孝勇、吳業坤、何雁詩、許廷鏗、劉威煌) – Super Voice ('飛聲')
- Mag Lam (林欣彤) – Water ('上善若水')
- Kate Tsui (徐子珊) – 'Wax and Wane' Opening Theme Song ('半圓')
- Miya (張靈) – Bearable('能捨能離')
- Alfred Hui (許廷鏗) – Water ('上善若水')
- Bosco Won g (黃宗澤) – Water ('上善若水')
- Michael Tse Tin Wah (謝天華) – Walking Alone ('獨行')
- Linda Chung, Ron Ng (鍾嘉欣、吳卓羲) – 'L'Escargot' Opening Theme Song ('傷城記')
- Susanna Kwan (關菊英) – 'Curse of the Royal Harem' Opening Theme Song ('各安天命')

==== 2012 ====
- Jonathan Wong Chee Hynn (王梓軒) – Online Game'Tales Runner'Theme Song 2012 ('魅影世紀')
- Det Dik, Rainky Wai (狄易達、蔚雨芯) – Old Camera ('傻瓜機')
- Mag Lam (林欣彤) – 'Three Kingdoms'Ending Theme Song ('三生有幸')
- Raymond Lam (林峯) – End of Innocence ('幼稚完')
- Raymond Lam (林峯) – Same Forest ('同林')
- Yu Kiu, Ava (雨僑) – Escape ('逃亡')
- Myolie Wu, Johnson Lee (胡杏兒、李思捷) – 'Wish and Switch' Opening Theme Song ('交換快樂')
- Joey Yung (容祖兒) – 'The Hippocratic Crush 2'Sound Track ('連續劇')
- Sita Chan (陳僖儀) – Noise ('嘈')
- Sita Chan (陳僖儀) – For Thousands of Years ('千秋')
- William Chan (陳偉霆) – Queen ('女皇')
- William Chan Feat. (陳偉霆 Feat. 泳兒) – Who Am I ('我是誰')（Rap Lyrics: 馮曦妤）
- Wayne Lai, Wu Ting Yan Nancy (黎耀祥、胡定欣) – 'The Confidant'Ending Theme Song ('日月')
- Fiona Sit (薛凱琪) – 'Silver Spoon, Sterling Shackles'Opening Theme Song- At This Very Moment ('此時此刻')
- Michael Tse Tin Wah, Niki Chow (謝天華、周麗淇) – 'Sergeant Tabloid' Opening Theme Song ('愛從心')
- Linda Chung (鍾嘉欣) – 'Missing You' OpeningTheme Song ('幸福歌')
- Shirley Kwan (關淑怡) – 'The Confidant'Opening Theme Song ('相濡以沫')

==== 2013 ====
- J.Arie – 'A Secret Between Us'Theme Song ('每一次都是你')
- Jonathan Wong Chee Hynn (王梓軒) – 'Midnight Munchies'Opening Theme Song ('越夜越快樂')
- Joey Yung (容祖兒) – 'The Hippocratic Crush 2'Opening Theme Song – Sequel ('續集')
- Niki Chow (周麗淇) – 'A Change of Heart 'Opening Theme Song ('心變')
- Mag Lam (林欣彤) – University of the Weird ('怪獸大學')
- Raymond Lam (林峯) – BB（與莊冬昕、林峯合填）
- Edwin Siu (蕭正楠) – 'A Great Way To Care II'Opening Theme Song ('圍牆')
- Alfred Hui (許廷鏗) – 'Will Power'Opening Theme Song ('遺物')
- Bosco Wong (黃宗澤) – Final Blessing ('最後祝福')
- Cai Jun Tao (蔡俊濤) – 'Detectives and Doctors'Opening Theme Song ('一點通')
- Rainky Wai (蔚雨芯) – 'Knock Knock Who's There' Theme Song ('無話可說')
- Miriam Yeung (楊千嬅) – Classmate ('同學')
- Ruco Chan, Edwin Siu (陳展鵬、蕭正楠) – 'Brother's Keeper'Opening Theme Song ('巨輪')
- Ryan Lau (劉威煌) – 'When Lanes Merge'Opening Theme Song ('不棄也不離')
- Shirley Kwan (關淑怡) – 'Always And Ever' Opening Theme Song ('實屬巧合')

==== 2014 ====
- Mag Lam (林欣彤) – Safety Zone ('安全地帶')
- Rainky Wai (蔚雨芯) – Toys ('玩具')

==== 2015 ====
- Jan Lamb (林海峰) – TV Most 'Time of Dog'Theme Song-Heartless Years (歲月毛情)
- Raymond Lam (林峯) – 'Detectives and Doctors'Opening Theme Song- Interlinked hearts ('心有靈犀')
- Eunice Chan (陳詩欣) – Drama of Love ('感情戲')
- Eunice Chan (陳詩欣) – Stupid ('蠢')
- Gloria Yip (葉蘊儀) – Rashomon of Women ('中女羅生門')
- Stephanie Cheng (鄭融) – The God of Black Face ('黑面神')
- Tang Chi Wai (鄧智偉) – Epic ('史詩式')
- Michael Lai (黎曉陽) – Slow Happiness ('快樂很慢')
- Michael Lai (黎曉陽) – Near ('永遠很近')
- Michael Lai (黎曉陽) – Escalator ('升降機')
- Michael Lai (黎曉陽) – The Strange Familiar ('最陌生的熟悉人')
- Michael Lai (黎曉陽) – Hong Kong Outstanding Junk Youngsters ('香港傑出廢青')
- Michael Lai (黎曉陽) – Fell Right Where I Fall ('邊度起身邊度跌返低')
- Michael Lai (黎曉陽) – Real Fake Literary Youngsters ('真偽文青')

==== 2019 ====
- Lam Yat-hei (林日曦) – Little Person ('小人物')

=== Magazines ===
- Black Paper (2010–)

Black Paper is a magazine criticising the 'normal' society. It is a one-page A5-size magazine with one side of pictures of people and the other side filled with ‘black sentence’. ‘Black sentence’ is a short sentence about the monthly theme. His idea is to make the sentences as short as possible so that people will have the patience to finish reading them. The overall style of the magazine is meant to be humorous and critical.

- 100 Most (2013–)

100 Most is a lifestyle magazine that was started by Roy Tsui, Bu and Chan Keung in 2013. The magazine is mainly about popular culture in Hong Kong.

=== Multimedia channel ===
- TV Most (2015–)

Tsui stated that ‘A single sheet of paper could be a magazine, so why must TV be on TV?’. He started the TV website, TVMost.

=== Books ===
Title	Book summary	Year of publication	Publisher
‘Idiot’ 《白痴》	First collection of prose written by Tsui. He criticizes the modern ‘normal’ society.	2012	White Paper Publishing
‘Green Veins’ 《青筋》	Another collection of prose by Tsui.	2013	White Paper Publishing
‘Black Face’ 《黑面》		2014	White Paper Publishing
‘Happy Never After’ 《快樂有限》	A collection of 37 short stories about happiness, loneliness, and sadness written by Tsui.	2014	White Paper Publishing
‘Excessively Romantic’ 《肉麻》	Being excessively romantic is an attitude.	2015	White Paper Publishing
‘Grey Eurasian Collared Dove’ 《灰鳩》		2015	White Paper Publishing

=== Columns ===
- Column at Sharp Daily (HK) – White Paper (Stopped Publication)
- Column at Apple Daily – Sink All Other than Books (Stopped Publication)
- Column at MingPao Weekly – Drama of Relationship
- Column at RoadShow – Farewell Love
- Column at City Magazine – Bookstory
- Column at Oriental Daily News – Why not idiotic
- Column at Hong Kong Economic Times – Off Topic

=== Talk show ===
In December 2019, Lam Yat-hei held his personal talk show, Sad But True (悲但真), as promised one year ago, which had allowed ticket reservations one year before the performance. There were 13 sessions from 11–22 December, including new-added sessions at MacStadium. All the tickets were sold out on 17 September. In the talk show, he talks about how an incident made him and his friend feel embarrassed when they were with each other. Then he found his friend again during the preparation of this talk show. He initiates mentioning that incident, and his friend is no longer mad at him. Secondly, he thought that he failed to play guitar because his guitar was borrowed by his classmates and he did not return it. Then, he started learning guitar again before the talk show and played guitar during his show to promote his new song, "Little person".

== Influences ==
He switched his secondary school five times and decided to drop out of IVE himself. For his career path, he first worked as a clerk, later as a producer, and later as the owner of two magazines and a publisher.

=== Family ===
His father thinks that the secondary school Tsui chose for himself does not fit him, he gives a simple criticism of his decision. He thinks it is alright to challenge authorities with one's own reason. This view is solidified after he reads the book The Crowd: A Study of the Popular Mind, published in 1895.

=== Others ===
Chan Wai Yee (Chan Wai) is the writer who influenced him most. He started reading extensively in his gap year after his decision to drop out of IVE. The stories written by Chan Wai are like everyday life, which is the reason why Tsui likes her books. Another artist that he finds interesting is Hsia Yu. There is one particular work Tsui admires, which is her collection of poems, Pink Noise.

Lin Xi is often considered his mentor in his writing of lyrics, though he never admitted it. Tsui first met Lin Xi at a meeting called by Winnie Yu after he submitted his lyrical works to her.

Winnie Yu also gives him the chance to switch from clerk to production.
