= Most Kwai Chung =

Media company in Hong Kong

Most Kwai Chung Limited
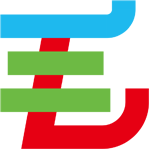
- Native name: 毛記葵涌有限公司
- Type: Public
- Traded as: SEHK: 1716
- Industry: Entertainment
- Founded: 2013; 13 years ago
- Area served: Hong Kong
- Brands: Blackpaper; 100Most; TVMost
- Number of employees: 29 (2015)
- Website: www.mostkwaichung.com

Most Kwai Chung Limited (Chinese: 毛記葵涌有限公司) is a magazine and online media company based in Hong Kong. The company is well-known for owning and running popular satirical magazine 100Most and online media platform TVMost.

== Background ==
The company and the "Most" brand is founded by Roy Tsui, when he launched 100Most in 2013. The Chinese name of the brand, “Most” and “Mou Gei” (Chinese: 毛記) is a parody of Hong Kong television station TVB and its Cantonese name “Mou Sin” (Chinese: 無綫).

The naming of the company trading name with the term "Kwai Chung", which is a district in Hong Kong, is because their headquarters is located in the Kwai Chung district, and that no other listed companies has added a New Territories area name into their trading name.

== History ==
The genesis of what would ultimately become Most Kwai Chung Limited was "Blackpaper Limited", formed in 2009 by song lyricist Tsui Ka-Ho (徐家豪) (pen name Lam Yat-hei (林日曦), Iu Kar-ho (姚家豪) (pen name "Ah Bu" (阿Bu)), and Luk Ka-chun (陸家俊) (pen name "Chan Keung" (陳強 (主持人)).

Its founding publication, "Black Paper" (黑紙), was originally a monthly issue consisting of a single-interview article crammed into an A5-size postcard and originally sold for HK$1 each. From that, "Black Paper" expanded into more regular short video interviews or topics from 2012 until the end of 2016. They were targeted at the young adult audience and known for being brief, punchy and to the point.

From these origins, and from the same creators, came numerous sister publications - all of which proved popular with the same young demographics.

- The satirical weekly magazine "100Most" from 2013 until 2018;
- Its video platform "TVMost", its most successful venture, was established in 2015 to harness the rapidly growing power of internet video publication, streaming and social media with sarcastic videos of a very Hong Kong flavour, sometimes even imitating TVB’s shows;.
- "White Paper", under which books on various youth-oriented topics were published from 2013 until 2021 under "Whitepaper Publishing Limited".

Company growth continued to the point when "Most Kwai Chung Limited" was founded in 2017 and which, on 26 July 2017, submitted its application for a listing in the Hong Kong Stock Exchange. Initlally turned down in January 2018, the company resubmitted its application on 29 January 2018 and proved successful, followed by its initial public offering (IPO) plans in March 2018. It became a listed trading company in Hong Kong with the ticker SEHK: 1716, majority-owned by "Blackpaper Limited".

The first day of its IPO records retail offer oversubscribed 6,288 times, raising HK$81 million and breaking Hong Kong's IPO record which was formerly held by the 2014 offering of Magnum Entertainment (now AUX International Holdings, SEHK: 2080) with the record of being oversubscribed 3,558 times.

On 5 March 2026, "Blackpaper Limited" reached an agreement with "Brave Steed Legacy Limited", owned by mainland Chinese entrepreneur Ma Liyang (馬黎陽), in which two of its founders, Iu ("Ah Bu") and Luk ("Chan Keung"), would sell their 65% majority-stake in "Most Kwai Chung Limited" to "Brave Steed Legacy Limited" for HK$122 million. The transaction was announced to the media on 11 March 2026.

== Products and subsidiaries ==
Most Kwai Chung is currently the parent company of the following brands and companies:

- Blackpaper
- 100Most
- TVMost
- Whitepaper Publishing
- French Rotational Production Limited
- Number Eighteen Limited (formerly known as Most Records Limited)
- General manager Management Limited
