= All Is Well =

All Is Well may refer to:

- All Is Well (2011 film), a film by Angolan filmmaker Pocas Pascoal
- All Is Well (2015 film), a Bollywood film
- All Is Well (2018 film), a German film
- All Is Well (album), a 2008 album by Sam Amidon
- All's Well (EP), a 2024 EP by Jesse McCartney
- "All Is Well" (hymn) or "Come, Come, Ye Saints", an 1846 Mormon hymn by William Clayton
- "All Is Well" (song), a 1960 song by Johnny Mathis
- "All Is Well", a song by Chicago from Chicago V
- "All Is Well", a song by Katey Sagal from Well...
- "All Is Well", a song by Michael W. Smith from Christmas
- "All Is Well", a song by Soul Asylum from The Silver Lining
- All Is Well, a 1955 film starring Toshiro Mifune
- All's Well That Ends Well, a Shakespearean comedy
- All Is Well (TV series), a 2019 Chinese drama television series
- All Is Well (sculpture), a 1974 sculpture by Edward J. Fraughton

== See also ==
- "All's Well", a 1941 Gabby cartoon by Fleischer Studios
- "Aal Izz Well", a song from the soundtrack of the film 3 Idiots
- "All's Well", a short story by P. G. Wodehouse collected in The Inimitable Jeeves
- All Is Not Well, a 1996 album by Tura Satana
- All's Well, Ends Well, a 1992 Hong Kong film, followed by several sequels
- All's Well That Ends Well (disambiguation)
- It's All Going Very Well..., upcoming Australian film by Tilda Cobham-Hervey
