= 100Most =

Weekly magazine

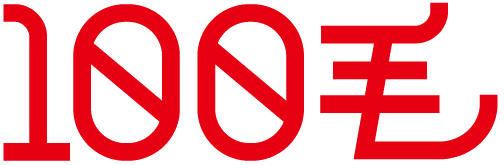
- Editor: Roy Tsui, Chan Keung and Bu
- Categories: humour
- Frequency: weekly
- Publisher: Most Kwai Chung Limited
- Founded: 2013
- First issue: 7 March 2013
- Final issue Number: 12 July 2018; 275
- Country: Hong Kong
- Language: Traditional Chinese
- Website: www.100most.com.hk
- ISSN: 2307-3012

100Most (Chinese: 100毛) was a satirical weekly magazine published in Hong Kong by Most Kwai Chung, which also runs online platform TVMost. The magazine featured graphics, jokes and reports. Disrespectful and stridently non-conformist in tone, the publication described its characteristics as "short", "hilarious" and "Hong Kong style". The slogan of 100Most is "看得完，剛剛好" (English: "Just Right").

Its 275th and final weekly issue was published on 12 July 2018, after which the magazine was only published in digital format.

== History ==
The magazine was founded by Roy Tsui, Bu and Chan Keung (林日曦, 陳強, 姚家豪), mainstays of Blackpaper. Its first issue appeared on 7 March 2013. The name 100Most is translated from its Chinese name 100毛. 毛 means hair or 10 cents in Mandarin Chinese literally. 100 represents the 100 focuses listed out in each issue.

100Most was one of the most famous magazines in Hong Kong, according to Roy Tsui, each issue reaching 80-90% sales in 2016. The target reader of this magazine is mainly post-eighties. The magazine was published every Thursday, with special editions issued on an unscheduled basis.

== Style ==
The philosophy of 100Most was "Short, Hilarious and "Hong Kong style". The founders believed that the life of Hong Kongers is hectic and tense. They wanted to write something to make them laugh and to arouse discussion.

It targeted young adults below 40 as its readers. The publishing team of the magazine consisted of people born in the 80s and 90s. Each issue of 100Most was largely written in Cantonese, including colloquial expressions. A major characteristic of each focus in 100Most was that it was kept short yet concise, with each focus in roughly 200 words. This moderate length suited the appetites of the young generation, favouring brief quality articles or news as opposed to lengthy passages.

The topics of 100Most were related to daily life and diversified, ranging from social issues to political issues. The writers put great emphasis on freedom of speech. The founder, Roy Tsui, spurned any self-censorship. Therefore, the magazine content was usually subjective, mainly consisting of personal opinions without much evidence-based research. Moreover, the magazine itself took a strong political stance, which could be reflected by its use of words and colours . For example, in its 89th issue (published on 11 November 2014), black and yellow, symbols of the pro-democracy Umbrella Movement, were used as the background colours in some of the pages. Another characteristic of 100Most was its use of graphics. Excel charts were commonly used to illustrate social issues. According to Chan Keung, the use of Excel charts helped deliver ideas in a clear and understandable way.

== Controversy ==
100Most was often placed at the centre of the copyright infringement disputes.

The first dispute could be dated back to late 2013, in which 100Most was accused of plagiarism after publishing an excerpt of a review of Bounty Lady without giving credit to the author, Lunyeah, a local blogger in Hong Kong and reducing him as "食飽飯無s屙嘅網民" (a netizen who makes troubles out of nothing). This led to a heated debate on social media.

Lunyeah made a statement on Facebook, saying that he was disappointed by 100Most and it is a common knowledge that citation is necessary when using others' ideas and thoughts. He was also angry about being denounced while his work was stolen. In December 2015, 100Most stated on its social media platform TV Most that Roy Tsui had apologised to Lunyeah at various occasions and Lunyeah accepted it.

In early 2015, 100Most was once again involved in copyright infringement after using images of Doraemon in the special edition that paid tribute to the late Doraemon voice actor Lam Pou-chuen who died on 2 January 2015. The public questioned whether 100Most infringed copyright.

On 9 January Animation International Ltd. (AIL), copyright owner of Doraemon, said to Apple Daily, stating that their staff were working on the infringement while Roy Tsui claimed that he was not familiar with the issue. One day later Tsui said he would not respond on this issue anymore because he has received a legal statement from AIL.
