= CCTV-15 =

Music channel of China Central Television

CCTV-15 音乐
- Country: People's Republic of China

Programming
- Picture format: 1080i HDTV

Ownership
- Owner: China Central Television

History
- Launched: 2004

Links
- Website: CCTV-15

Availability

Terrestrial
- Digital TV (DTMB): Digital channel numbers varies by area.

Streaming media
- CCTV program website: CCTV-15 (some program may screened off due to copyright restriction)

CCTV-15 is one of the official broadcasting channels of China Central Television launched on March 29, 2004. It aims to broadcast a diverse assortment of different music genres, including classical music, Chinese traditional and minority music, as well as popular music. It also has periodic music programs on famous classical or popular composers as well as music in movies.

The startup sequence features scenes across the world, from Catholic churches to Chinese palaces, gardens and water towns, a Spanish boulevard, Gothic, neo-classic, and classic architectures in Europe and children from across the world as well to a rendition of 茉莉花, a traditional Chinese song. This sequence shows the channel's value of broadcasting not only Chinese music, but international music as well as classic & modern music.

The channel was announced in March 2004 as an alternative to MTV China and Channel V. Pop music would also air but would share with more traditional forms of music. At launch it broadcast for 13 hours.
