= All's Well That Ends Well (disambiguation) =

All's Well That Ends Well is a play by William Shakespeare.

All's Well That Ends Well is also a common proverb in English and may refer to:

== TV ==
- "All's Well That Ends Well", a 1981 episode of BBC Television Shakespeare
- "All's Well That Ends Well" (iZombie), a 2019 episode of iZombie

== Albums ==
- All's Well That Ends Well (Man album), an album by Man
- All's Well That Ends Well (Chiodos album), a 2005 album by the group Chiodos
- All's Well That Ends Well (Steve Lukather album), a 2010 album by Steve Lukather

== See also ==
- All's Well, Ends Well, a 1992 Hong Kong comedy film and its five sequels
- "All's Wells That Ends Wells", an episode of The Flash
