= Blackpaper =

Magazine

Blackpaper Magazine (Chinese: 黑紙; Jyutping: hak1 zi2) was a Hong Kong magazine founded by Roy Tsui, Luk Ka Chun and Yiu Ka Ho in 2009, and owned by Most Kwai Chung.

== History ==
The Blackpaper magazine was published on the 1st and 15th of each month and sold at 7-Eleven only. It was printed on A5 paper and folded in half.

In 2010, it sold 160,000 copies in Hong Kong. The magazine ceased publication on 1 January 2017.

Outside the magazine, the company also sold merchandise like T-shirts and books.

== Rationale ==
Blackpaper published content in short for the local new generation, mostly post-80s and post-90s, to encourage them to read. It features celebrities as cover people, especially from the local entertainment sphere. Sometimes, they would invite political figures.

== Changes ==
Each year, the main theme of Blackpaper changes, but it mainly contains a "black interview" (黑訪; interview with celebrities), "black survey" (黑調; results of survey related to the theme of that issue) and "black sentence" (黑句; sarcastic sentences based on the theme of that issue).

=== 2010 ===
Branded as a "Faux Literature Magazine" (偽文學雜誌). Every issue was titled with a single word and only 'black sentence' as its contents. There was no limit on the colour tone.

=== 2011 ===
Branded as a "Faux Entertainment Magazine" (偽娛樂雜誌). Every issue was titled with a single word, with 'black sentence' and 'black interview'. The cover was in greyscale, including the portraits of the interviewees in 'black interview'.

=== 2012 ===
Branded as a "Faux Advertisement Magazine" (偽廣告雜誌). Every issue was titled with a two-word vocabulary. Most of the issues were composed of "black sentence" and "black interview". Some of them were composed with other kinds of verbal creation, such as drafts and graphics. On the covers, portraits of interviewees were in greyscale, and the title was in colour.

==== Special Edition ====
The September 2012 edition features the 11 reasons why the Moral and National Education has to be retracted. The issue was distributed in the related protest at the Central Government Complex, Tamar, Hong Kong.

=== 2013 ===
Branded as a "Faux Love (Romantic) Magazine" (偽愛情雜誌). The titles of the issues started with "I hate.. the most" (最憎……), such as 'I hate hypocrites the most', in local film director Wong Jing's issue.

Issues were composed of "black sentence", "black interview" and "black statistics". The covers are printed in colour, but the interviewees' full-length photos are in greyscale.

=== 2014 ===
Branded as a "Faux Times Magazine" (偽時代雜誌). The titles of the issues were ”People of the...“ (⋯⋯風雲人物). Every issue was composed of 'black sentence' and 'black interview'. Covers were printed with the profile shots of the interviewees in colour.

== Influences ==
=== Politics ===
Topics related to Hong Kong politics are their main focus, especially during the June Forth event and election in Hong Kong.

Every year, Blackpaper titles "June Fourth" (六四), the Tiananmen Square protests of 1989, as its first issue of June, in order to remind the public of the struggles.

After the Hong Kong Chief Executive election of 2012, Blackpaper published an issue titled "Darkness" (黑暗), expressing distrust towards Leung Chun-ying, the new chief executive. Moreover, another issue published in August 2012 disapproved of the 2012 Hong Kong legislative election.

Some celebrities from the local entertainment sphere were asked about the issues in Hong Kong society. For instance, Mag Lam, a local diva, expressed her opinion toward education in Hong Kong.

Blackpaper Magazine was used in some protests. During the protest against Moral and National Education in Hong Kong in 2012, the founders of Blackpaper issued a special edition of Blackpaper Magazine with the word "Retract" (撤回) printed on it.

Copies of this issue of Blackpaper were distributed to protesters outside the Central Government Complex on 7 September. Members and supporters of Scholarism held up the magazine during the protest. Some students put Blackpaper Magazine on their school bulletin board.

During the debate of the Copyright (Amendment) Bill 2011 in Hong Kong, which the public treated as Internet Article 23, Blackpaper published an issue called "Parody" (惡搞), with some paper glasses attached to that issue. It invited readers to wear them as real glasses. Later, many people posted photos of their recreated images with the paper glasses on Facebook, including local artist, Shawn Yue and the member of the Legislative Council of Hong Kong, James Tien Pei-chun.

=== Culture ===
==== Derivative works ====
Many derivative works of Blackpaper Magazine were created into various 'fraux-Blackpaper Magazine' to attract teenagers.

For example, souvenirs distributed by Beacon College's tutor, Yat Yan Lam, and dessert recipes in local convenience stores.

==== Language ====
Blackpaper used Cantonese and words commonly known among teenagers like "plastic" (膠) and "blow" (吹), which can be vulgar.

=== Criticism ===
The deliberate short length in each issue led to criticism by netizens of Blackpaper and 100Most, another magazine that was also founded by the same group, that these magazines will degrade teenagers' ability to write long articles.

The founder responded, saying that they only aimed at helping readers become people who pays more attention to society and themselves through reading Blackpaper.
