= Cross-Strait Television =

Chinese satellite television channel

Cross-Strait Television (Chinese: 海峽衛視) is a satellite television channel based in Fujian, China, that primarily targets overseas Chinese, Hong Kong, Macau, and Taiwan. It was launched on January 25, 2005, as the international channel of Southeast TV, and later renamed Fujian Strait TV in October of the same year. In 2020, it merged with Southeast Satellite TV to form the Satellite TV Center.

== History ==
Cross-Strait Television's predecessor, the Southeast TV international channel, was launched on January 25, 2005. Initially, it was broadcast through the "Great Wall Platform" of the State Administration of Radio, Film, and Television, reaching North America and Southeast Asia viewers. Over time, its coverage expanded to include other parts of Asia, Europe, Africa, and Oceania.

On October 1, 2005, the channel officially changed its name to Fujian Strait TV, with the call sign "Strait Satellite TV." Its programming mainly catered to overseas Chinese and in Hong Kong, Macau, and Taiwan.
