= TVMost =

Hong Kong online video platform

TVMost 毛記電視
- Industry: Broadcasting
- Founded: 2015
- Founder: Roy Tsui
- Headquarters: Flat 5, 1/F, Block B Tung Chun Industrial Building, 11-13 Tai Yuen Street, Kwai Chung, N.T.
- Key people: Roy Tsui, Chan Keung (陳強), Bu (姚家豪)
- Parent: Most Kwai Chung Limited
- Website: www.tvmost.com.hk

TVMost (Chinese: 毛記電視) is a Hong Kong online video platform established by Most Kwai Chung, the company which also runs Hong Kong magazine 100Most. It uploads daily sarcastic videos satirizing current events in Hong Kong. Its slogan is "Go all out, even better without a licence" (Chinese: 全力以赴，無牌仲好).

== Background ==
TVMost is built up by Roy Tsui (Chinese: 林日曦), the founder of the magazine Black Paper, 100Most and the publication house White Paper on May 18, 2015. It offers various programmes such as news, variety show and documentary online uploaded in an irregular basis. In addition, latest videos were posted to related social media sites, such as their official Facebook page, Instagram account and website. TVMost also welcomes advertisements in iMedia formats and co-op projects from advertisers for the sake of creating advertorial videos and promote the products in a humorous way.

== Style ==
Programmes in TVMost feature satire and humour, similar to the magazine of its parent company 100Most. They satirize the Hong Kong Government and controversial social issues, appealing to an audience that opposes the power establishment in the city. Local celebrities such as Gloria Yip, Gregory Wong and Akina Fong often act as special guests in the shows, especially in ‘Most News’ and ‘Ging Cook Gum Cook.’

The duration of these programmes is generally less than 10 minutes. According to the founder of TVMost, Roy Tsui, these short segments are tailored to viewers’ busy lives and shorter attention spans.

== Programmes ==
=== Variety ===
==== Funny Choice (明張目膽 fun fun選) ====
Parody of the same session of TVB's informative show 'Scoop'. Hosted by On But Chuen, this variety show is divided into two parts. First, question and answer session (mainly in multiple choice format); second, prize giving session. This is the only programme that provides chances for audience to participate in TVMost's events because they may submit their answers through the Internet. The programme is known for providing comic relief to audience as well as arising their awareness about the controversial issues in Hong Kong, as the host often tells sardonic jokes.

==== Ging Cook Gum Cook (勁曲金曲) ====
A weekly billboard programme which is a satirical take on TVB’s music programme Jade Solid Gold parodying real songs whilst poking fun at and raising concerns about social issues. A song that has been on the billboard since the show started is 'Forever ATV' by Gregory Charles Rivers, a play on famous singer Jacky Cheung Hok-yau’s 'Forever Love'. It jabbed at ATV’s tendency to rebroadcast decades-old programmes rather than making new ones and its delay to paystaff wages. Famous singers in Hong Kong such as Gloria Yip, Hanjin Tan has been invited to film this show.

=== Documentary ===
==== Wednesday Report (星期三港案) ====
A five-minute mini documentary narrated by Stephen Chan Chi-wan, mainly interviewing people in Hong Kong that do great things or make great influence to the society. Interviewees in the previous episodes include the first transsexual women in Hong Kong advocating issues related to LGBT, an ordinary resident in Hong Kong that came out to be a candidate in the District Council election 2015 to fight against the pro-establishment camp. Compared with other programmes produced by TVMost, the tone of Wednesday Report is more formal and serious. It airs every Wednesday.

=== Featured ===
==== TVMost Ten Big Ging Cook Gum Cook Award Distribution (毛記電視第一屆十大勁曲金曲分獎典禮) ====
It was held on 11 January 2016 at Queen Elizabeth Stadium, which targeted in making fun of the local music industry's establishment and honouring artistes that paid much effort in making music. It served as an extension of the TV programme ‘Ging Cook Gum Cook’, as the awarded songs were re-composed popular songs with ironic contents. Sponsored by Shell (Hong Kong) Limited and Gatsby Hong Kong. Some celebrities were invited to attend the ceremony, including Gregory Wong, Stephanie Cheng and Denise Ho. ‘Forever ATV’ sung by Gregory Charles Rivers was awarded the 'Best Song'. A total of 19 awards were distributed in the show.

Live broadcast was arranged on Now TV Channel 100. The entire ceremony was later archived on TVMost's official website.

==== Happy TVMost Birthday To Me (萬千呃Like賀台慶) ====
An anniversary show of TVMost to be held on 11 May 2015 at the Hong Kong Convention and Exhibition Centre. Sponsored by Pricerite Hong Kong.

== Artistes ==
The casting list of TVMost consists of 29 artistes. Most of them are fictional characters alluding the news anchors and artistes in TVB. For example:

- Tung Fong Shing (Alluding TVB news anchor Anthony Fong Tung Shing, original name: Wong Ka Wai)
- Chiu Hoi Chu (Alluding former TVB news anchor Alison Chiu Hoi Chu, original name: Kiki Tam)
- Ng Ling Chun (Alluding TVB news anchor Kenneth Ng King Chun)
- Chui Kin Mong (Alluding TVB host Amigo Choi, original name: Kyle Wong aka Ah Ho)
- Dickson (Alluding Dicky, the guest on TVB finance programme ‘Money Smart’, original name: Yuen Man Tai Ivan)
- Poon Choi Ying Tsz (Alluding former TVB news anchor Julia Poon Tsui Ying, original name: Or Tsui Ting Christy)
- Chow Ka Yim (Alluding former TVB news anchor Chow Ka Yee Venus)
- Wong Cham Ying (Alluding former TVB news anchor Wong Tsz Ying Connie, original name: Jessica Lee)
- Lee Kwan Ngar (Alluding former TVB news anchor Nabela Qoser, original name: Chan Pak Ling Mavis)
- 55555 Ka Him (Alluding former TVB news anchor Ng Ka Him Vince, original name: Siu Wai)
- Law Yuek Off (Alluding TVB news anchor Law Yuek On Yvonne, original name: Mandi Cheuk)

== Facilities ==
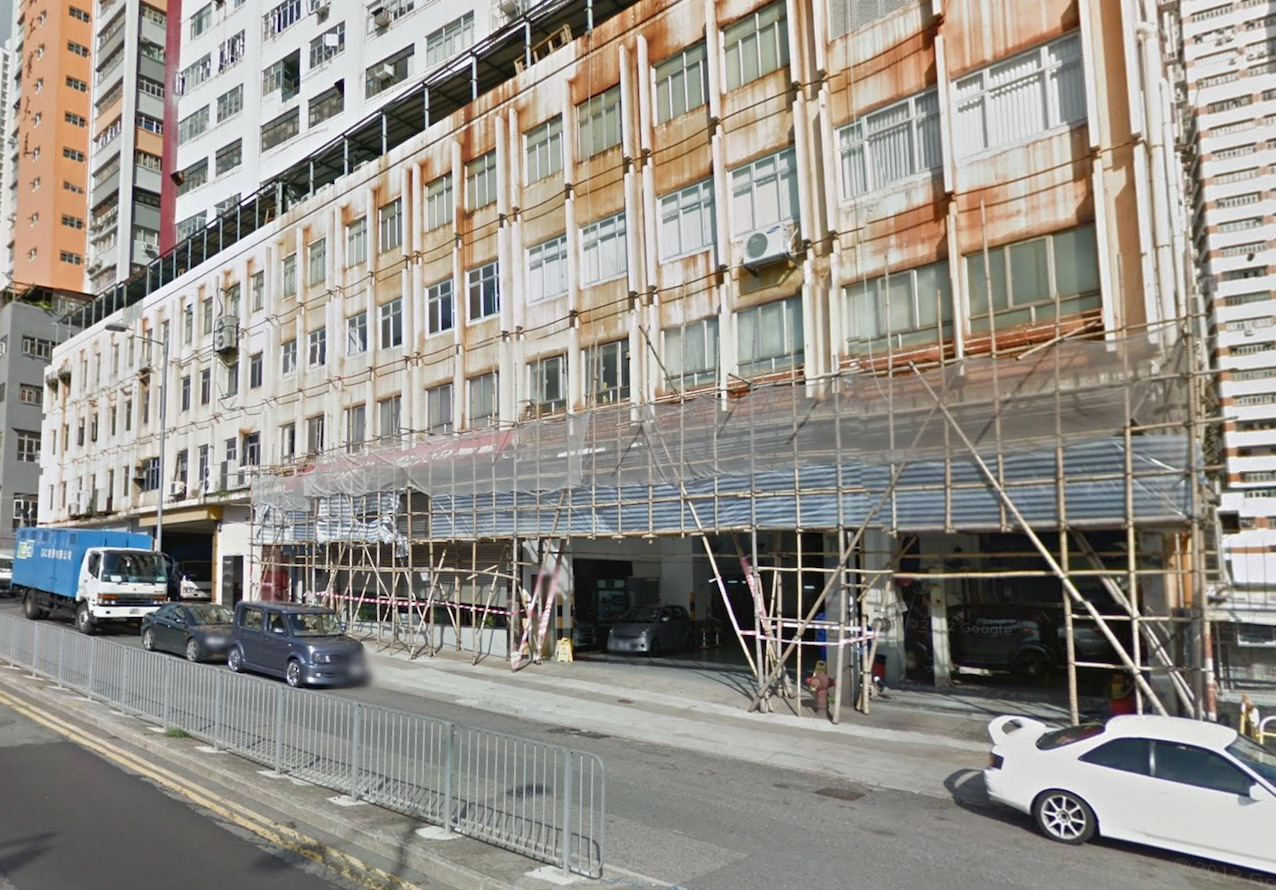
TVMost's headquarters in Kwai Chung.

The headquarters of TVMost is located at Tung Chun Industrial Building, Kwai Chung. It is a small flat equipped with an indoor and outdoor multi-purpose production studios. Together served as the editorial office of its parent company 100Most.

== See also ==
- 100Most
