= Frownland =

Frownland may refer to:

- "Frownland", a song by Captain Beefheart from his 1969 album Trout Mask Replica
- "Frownland", a song by Chat Pile from their 2024 album Cool World
- Frownland (film), a 2007 film by Ronald Bronstein
