= Chung Chi-kwong =

- 鍾志光
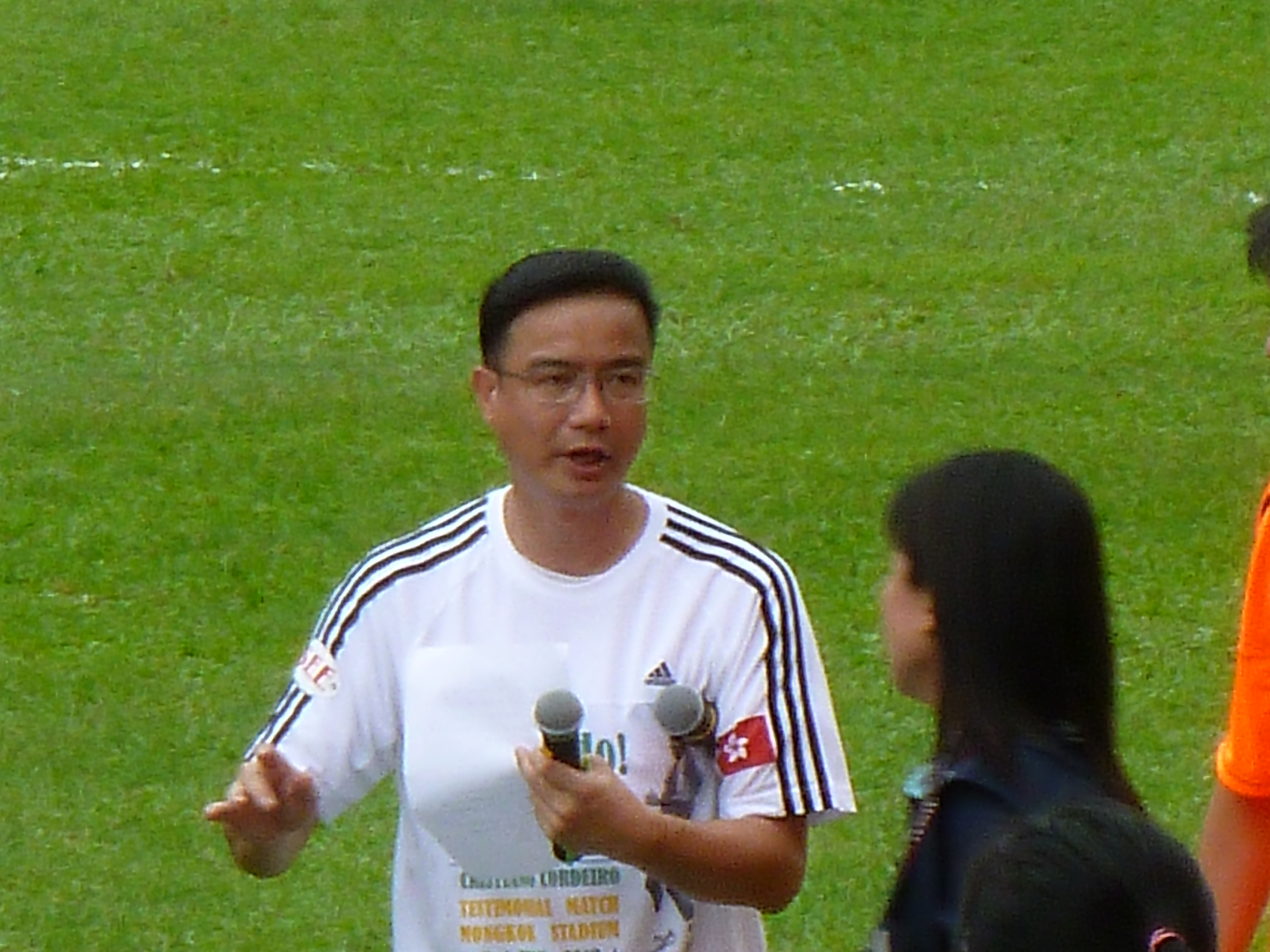
- Chung in June 2012
- Born: Chung Chi-kwong
- Other name: Eric Chung
- Education: Grantham College of Education (diploma); Open University of Hong Kong (Bachelor's); University of Hong Kong (Master's)
- Alma mater: University of Hong Kong
- Occupations: Sports commentator and artist

Eric Chung Chi-kwong (Chinese: 鍾志光) is a Hong Kong TVB sports commentator and artist under basic artist contract, and also serves as the secretary of Hong Kong First Division Football League club Morning Light.

== Background ==
=== Early life ===
Chung Chi-kwong grew up in Sham Shui Po and has an older brother. His childhood entertainment mainly consisted of playing football and watching Cantonese feature films, and he was raised by his grandmother. Chung graduated from Pui Shing Catholic Secondary School. Although he passed the sixth form foundation after graduating, he was unable to enter university due to the limited degree available at that time. Therefore, he decided to enroll in the Sports Diploma Course at Grantham College of Education.

=== Education ===
Chung has a diploma in physical education from the Grantham College of Education, a Bachelor's Degree in Humanities with honors from the Open University of Hong Kong, a Master's Degree in Chinese language and literature from the University of Hong Kong, as well as in philosophy from the Chinese University of Hong Kong. In 2024, he was awarded the title of Honorary Fellow of the Education University of Hong Kong.

=== Participation in on-stage performances ===
While working at Hong Kong Commercial Radio in the 1980s, Chung was mainly responsible for preparing interviews for Sports Radar as well as news. He also guest-starred in the radio dramas "Hong Kong Strange Cases" (voiced by Lam Kor-wan) and "Block 18, Block C" (voiced by Disco). In 1990, he moved between TVB and radio stations. While providing television commentary for the 1990 FIFA World Cup, he signed a contract with the TV station in 1989 and later participated in the narration of the football segment of "Soccer Fan".

Chung began to participate in TV dramas in 1996. TVB's drama producer, Kwong Yip-sang, asked him to guest-star as the Cuju narrator in Taming of the Princess. He later appeared in other TV dramas, primarily as an event commentator. Chung specialized in roles with extensive dialogue, such as doctor, lawyer, teacher, program host.

Some viewers have questioned commentator Chung's professionalism, noting his focus on atmosphere over in-depth match analysis compared to his peers. As a co-host at "Fans World" with Spencer Lam and Choi Yuk-yu, Chung was responsible for information while Lam talked about anecdotes and stories and Choi analyzed the games. In 2003, Chung received a Bachelor of Arts degree in Chinese Humanities from the Open University of Hong Kong. He subsequently obtained a Master of Chinese Language and Literature from the University of Hong Kong in 2008 and a Master of Arts in Philosophy from the Chinese University of Hong Kong in 2012. Since he started his art career, Chung has been working part-time to complete his degrees. In 2024, Chung was awarded the title of Honorary Fellow by the Education University of Hong Kong in recognition of his contributions to the sports world and the promotion of Chinese culture.

== Controversy ==
2010 FIFA World Cup TVB failed to secure the World Cup broadcasting rights and produced "World Cup in Motion" to compete with Cable TV Hong Kong. However, the male hosts frequently made suggestive jokes about the female hosts' figures. When the topic turned to Wong Yuen-man, Louis Yuen asked, "Is she as big as she wants?" Shortly after, Cheung Kwok-keung (Hong Kong actor) said, "I think Bingbing (Wong Yuen-man) wants to be even bigger." At this point, Chung Chi-kwong also chimed in, saying, "She's already quite big... in terms of fame."
