= Ürümqi People's Broadcasting Station =

TV station in Xinjiang, China

Chinese name
- Simplified Chinese: 乌鲁木齐人民广播电台
- Hanyu Pinyin: Wūlǔmùqí rénmín guǎngbō diàntái

Uyghur name
- Uyghur: ئۈرۈمچى خەلق رادىيو ئىستانسىسى
- Latin Yëziqi: Ürümchi xelq radiyo istansisi

Ürümqi People's Broadcasting Station (short: UBS) was a radio station broadcasting to Ürümqi and the Xinjiang province area, in China. It was operated by the Xinjiang Networking Transmission Limited in Mandarin and Uyghur. It existed from 1979 until 2019 when it merged with Ürümqi Television, forming Ürümqi Radio and TV Station (Chinese: 乌鲁木齐市广播电视台; pinyin: Wūlǔmùqí shì guǎngbò diànshìtái).

From 1949 to 1951 the Xinjiang People's Broadcasting Station was named after Ürümqi instead of Xinjiang in Uyghur (迪化 Díhuà in Chinese).

== List of programmes ==
Ürümqi Radio Stations
| Programme | Description |
|---|---|
| FM1007新闻广播 | News |
| FM974交通广播 | Traffic |
| FM1065旅游音乐 | Music |
| AM927经济广播 | Health News |
| AM792综合广播 | General |
| AM1071&FM1046维语节目 | Uyghur programme |

== See also ==
- Xinjiang People's Broadcasting Station
- Ürümqi
