= Gulchehra Hoja =

American journalist

Gulchehra A. Hoja
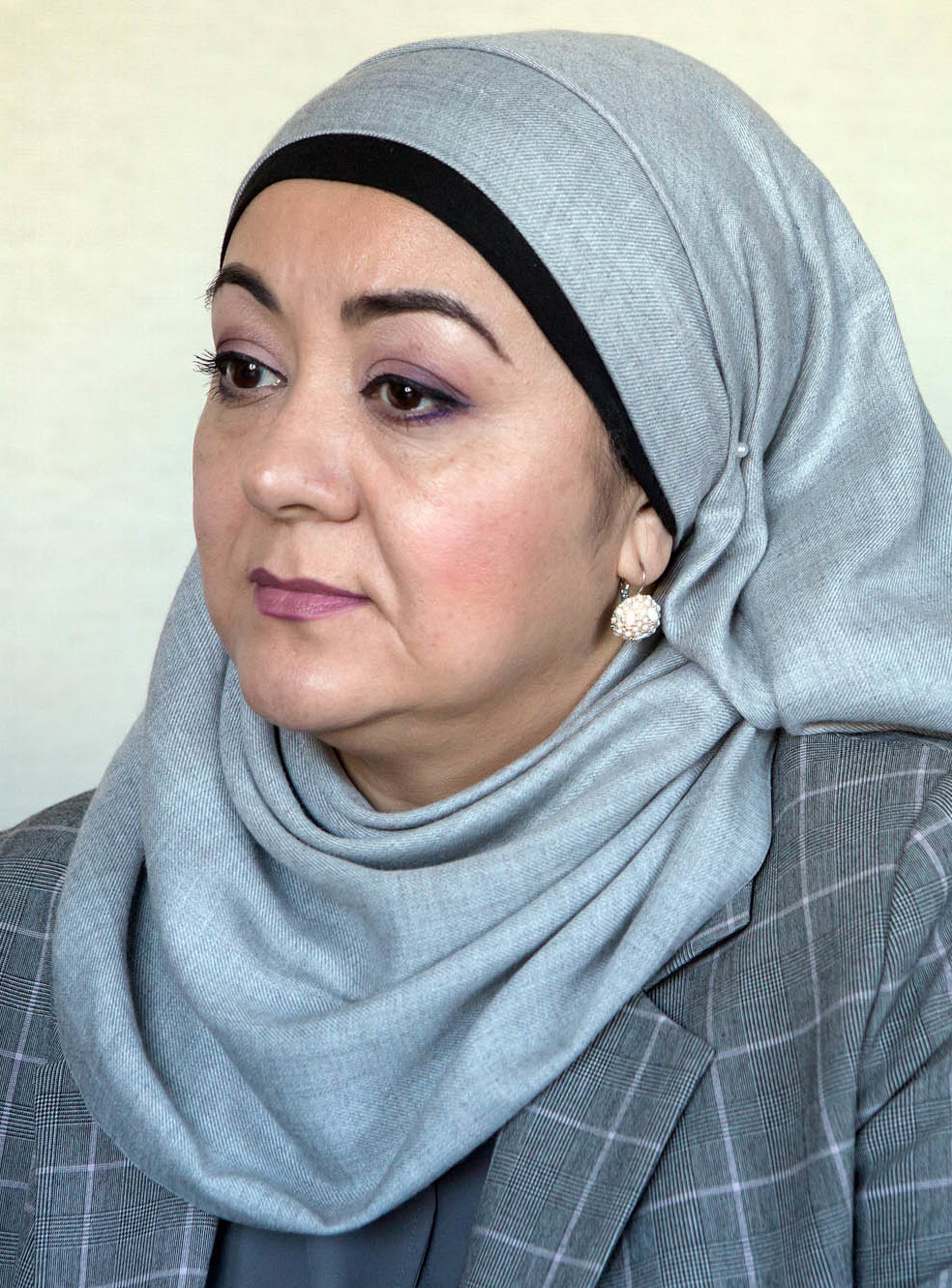
- Born: 1973 (age 52–53); Ürümqi, Xinjiang, China
- Citizenship: United States
- Education: Bachelor's degree in Uyghur language and literature, Xinjiang Normal University
- Known for: Radio Free Asia journalist

Gulchehra "Guli" A. Hoja (born 1973) is a Uyghur-American journalist who has worked for Radio Free Asia since 2001. In November 2019, Hoja received the Magnitsky Human Rights Award for her reporting on the ongoing human rights crisis in Xinjiang and in 2020, Hoja received the Courage in Journalism Award from the International Women's Media Foundation and was listed among The 500 Most Influential Muslims.

== Early life ==
Hoja was born in 1973 in Ürümqi, the capital of the Xinjiang Uygur Autonomous Region of the People's Republic of China. Her father was a noted author and archaeologist who served as the head of the archaeology department of Xinjiang Regional Museum; Her writing focused on Uyghur language and history and his archaeological work included field work on mummies found in the Tarim Basin. Hoja's mother worked both as a professor of pharmacology and as a pharmacist. She has one brother, who is one-and-one-half years younger than her. Her grandfather was a widely known composer of traditional Uyghur music.

While growing up, Hoja attended Uyghur-language schools that were run by ethnic Uyghurs.

Hoja is a graduate of Xinjiang Normal University, where she earned a bachelor's degree in Uyghur language and literature.

== Career ==
=== Chinese State Media ===
After graduating college, Hoja became the host of the first Uyghur-language children television program in China and became well known throughout Xinjiang as a result of her role. Hoja worked for Chinese state media outlets, including Xinjiang Television and China Central Television.

=== Leaving China and Work with Radio Free Asia ===
Hoja first started to become uncomfortable with her work with Chinese state media and the treatment of the Uyghur people after she visited and reported on Uyghur children who were taken away from their home and villages to be raised in "mainland" China.

In 2001, while on vacation in Austria, Hoja accessed the internet for the first time and learned about the activities of the Uyghur activists outside of China. While in the Austrian capital of Vienna, feeling ashamed of her work for Chinese state media, Hoja decided to not return to China. In October of that year, Hoja immigrated to the United States and began working for Radio Free Asia, reporting on the repression of the Uyghur people by the Chinese government.

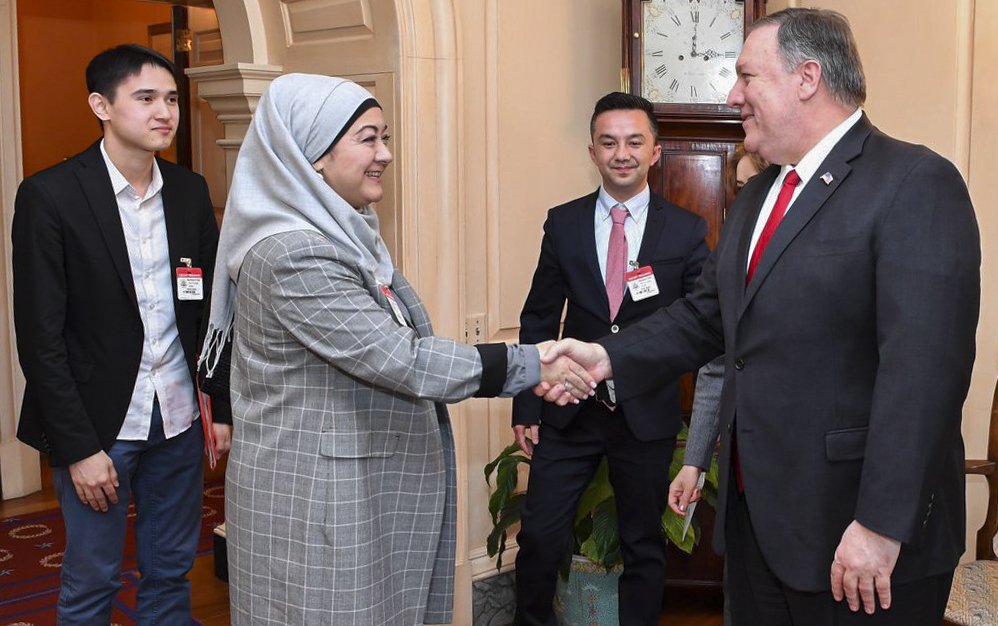
2020

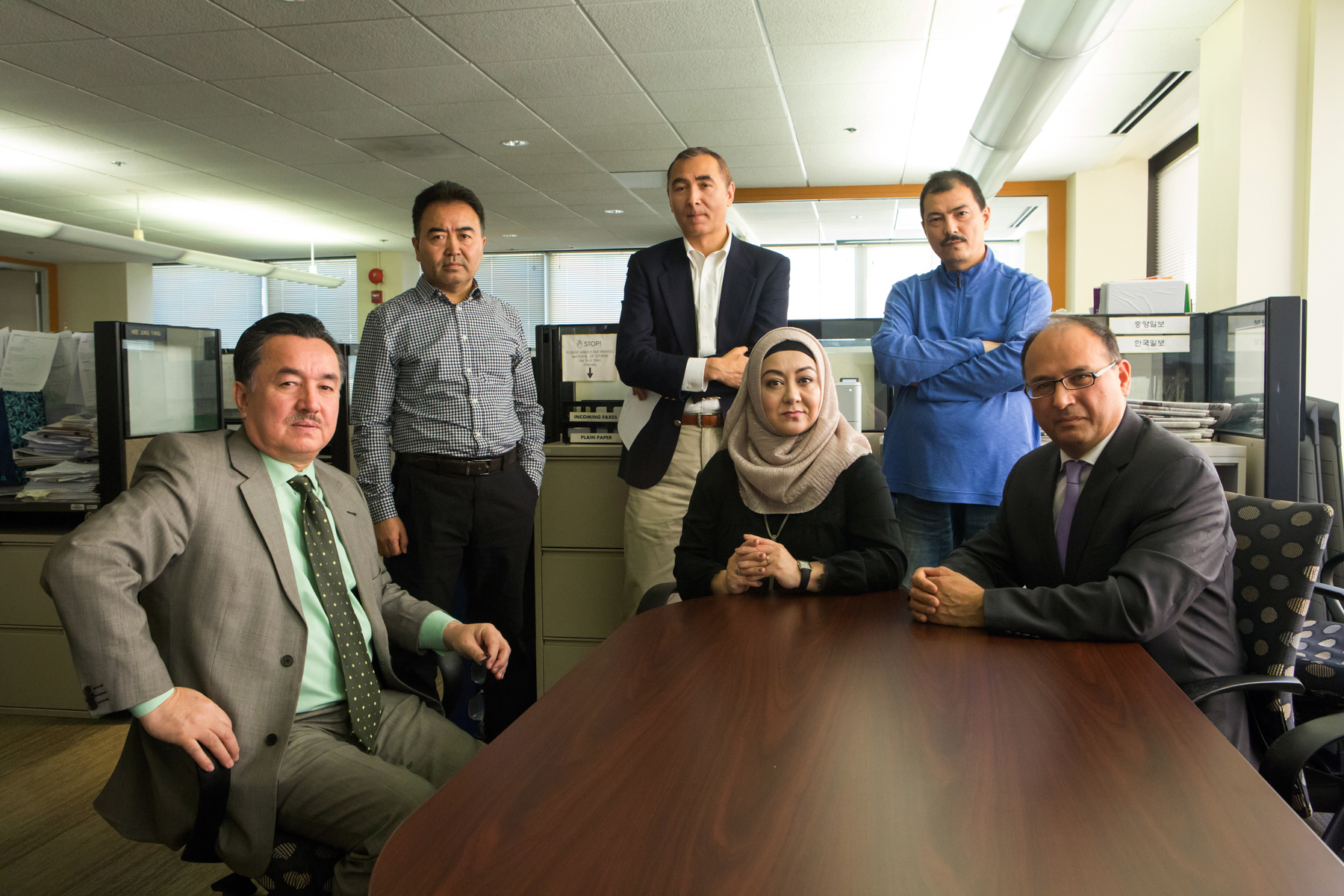
With other Uyghur journalists at RFA

In 2017 Hoja was accused of being a terrorist by the Chinese government and placed on the Most Wanted list. Her brother was also arrested at this time and placed in one of the Xinjiang re-education camps due to Hoja's reporting.

On January 28, 2018, Hoja published an interview with Omurbek Eli, who was arrested and accused of "terrorist activities" while visiting his parents in Xinjiang. Eli was held in one of the Xinjiang re-education camps and later released. Three days later on January 31, twenty-five members of Hoja's family were summoned to local police stations in Xinjiang and detained due to their connection with Hoja.

In April 2021, videos were released of Hoja's mother and brother in which they claim to be leading normal lives and criticize Hoja's reporting. Hoja believes this to be forced testimony.

On March 27, 2019, Hoja met with US Secretary of State Mike Pompeo as a representative of persons with family members held in the Xinjiang re-education camps.

== Accolades ==
In November 2019, Hoja received the Magnitsky Human Rights Award for her reporting on the ongoing human rights crisis in Xinjiang.

In 2020, Hoja was listed among The 500 Most Influential Muslims.

In 2020, Hoja received the Courage in Journalism Award from the International Women's Media Foundation.

== Personal life ==
Hoja lives in Woodbridge, Virginia with her husband and three children.
