= Xinjiang Networking Transmission Limited =

TV company operating in China's Xinjiang Uyghur Autonomous region

Xinjiang Networking Transmission Limited (Chinese: 新疆广电传输网络有限责任公司), also known as Xinjiang Broadcast Network, consists of media broadcasting to Ürümqi and the Xinjiang province area. It operates the Urumqi People's Broadcasting Station and the Xinjiang People's Broadcasting Station, broadcasting in the Mandarin (dialect), Uyghur (dialect), Kazakh, Kyrgyz and Mongolian languages.
