= Xinjiang Normal University =

University in Ürümqi, Xinjiang Uyghur Autonomous Region, China

- Type: Public
- Established: 1978; 48 years ago
- Location: Ürümqi, Xinjiang, China; 43.83165°N 87.59007°E
- Campus: Urban
- Website: www.xjnu.edu.cn
- Location within Xinjiang Location within China

Xinjiang Normal University (XJNU) (Uyghur: شىنجاڭ پىداگوگېكا ئۇنىۋېرسىتېتى, romanized: Shinjang Pidagogéka Uniwérsitéti; Chinese: 新疆师范大学; pinyin: Xīnjiāng Shīfàn Dàxué) is a public university in the Xinjiang Uyghur Autonomous Region of the People's Republic of China, which was established in December 1978 with the approval of the Ministry of Education, and its predecessors were Ürümqi First Normal School and Xinjiang Teacher Training Department.

== Alumni ==
- Gulchehra Hoja, journalist
