= Hong Shan =

Mountain in Ürümqi, Xinjiang, China

Coordinates: 43.808562°N 87.60455°E

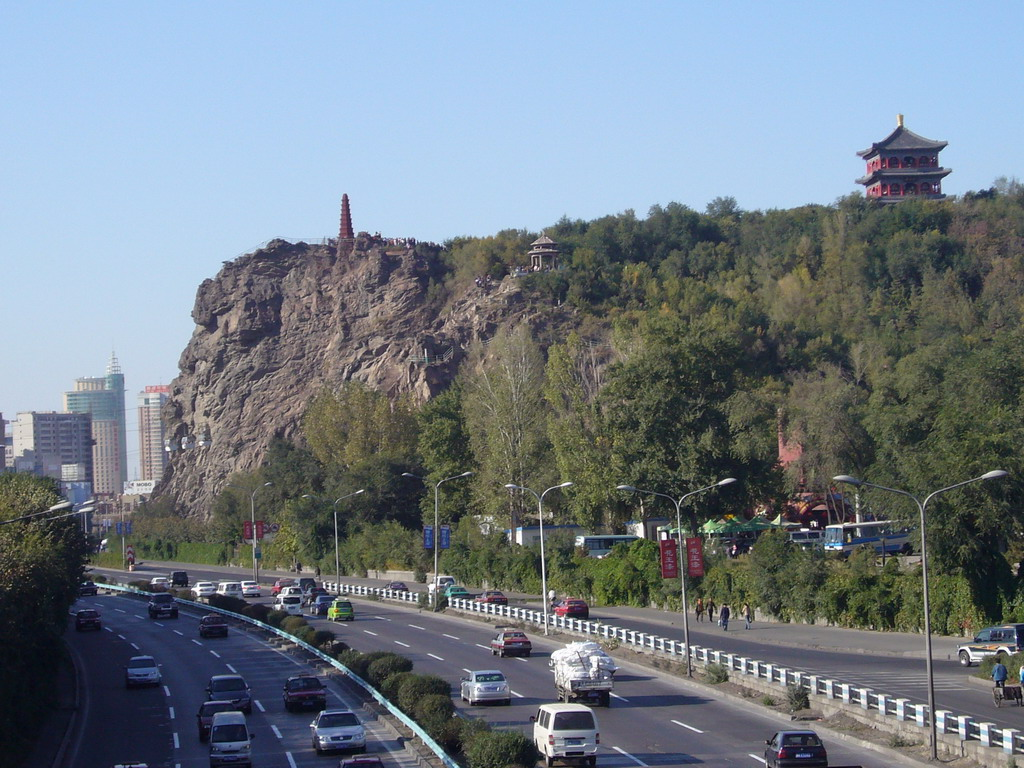
Hong Shan seen from Xi Daqiao Bridge, Ürümqi

Hong Shan, Hongshan or the Red Mountain (Chinese: 红山; Pinyin: Hóng Shān; Uyghur: قىزىلتاغ, Қизилтағ; Qiziltagh) is an inner city mountain in Ürümqi, capital of Xinjiang Uyghur Autonomous Region, China. The mountain, sometimes referred to as a hill for its smaller size than a mountain in land form, is the symbolic scenic spot of Ürümqi. The local Ürümqi Television Station adopted the shape of Hong Shan in red as its logo.

== Etymology ==
As the rocks of the mountain reflect a bright red color, people call it Hong Shan ("Red Mountain" in Chinese). The red rocks are composed of dark purple sand gravel laid down during the Permian period. Hong Shan Mountain lies at the intersection of Hongshan Road (红山路) and Riverside Road (Hetan Road) (河滩路), Ürümqi, and is best viewed from Xi Daqiao Bridge (西大桥).

== History ==
Hong Shan Park is in the center of Ürümqi and contains a 1391-meter-high mountain. The temple lying on the hilltop is called Yu Huang Ge ("Chamber of Heavenly King") and is said to have been built during the Tang dynasty (618–907 AD), when many monks studied scripture there. There is a nine-storey pagoda named Zhen Long Ta (Genuine dragon Pagoda) at the top of the mountain. It was built in Yuan dynasty (1277–1367 AD). This 25-meter pagoda has been preserved carefully ever since it was built. The pagoda's view at sunset is considered to be one of the eight most famous scenic sights in ancient Ürümqi.

Before the Chinese government began the cultivation-planting project in Xinjiang, Hong Shan was treeless. After several years of planting, the mountain gained its current tree covered appearance.
