= Grand Bazaar, Ürümqi =

Marketplace in Xinjiang, China

Coordinates: 43°46′45″N 87°36′57″E

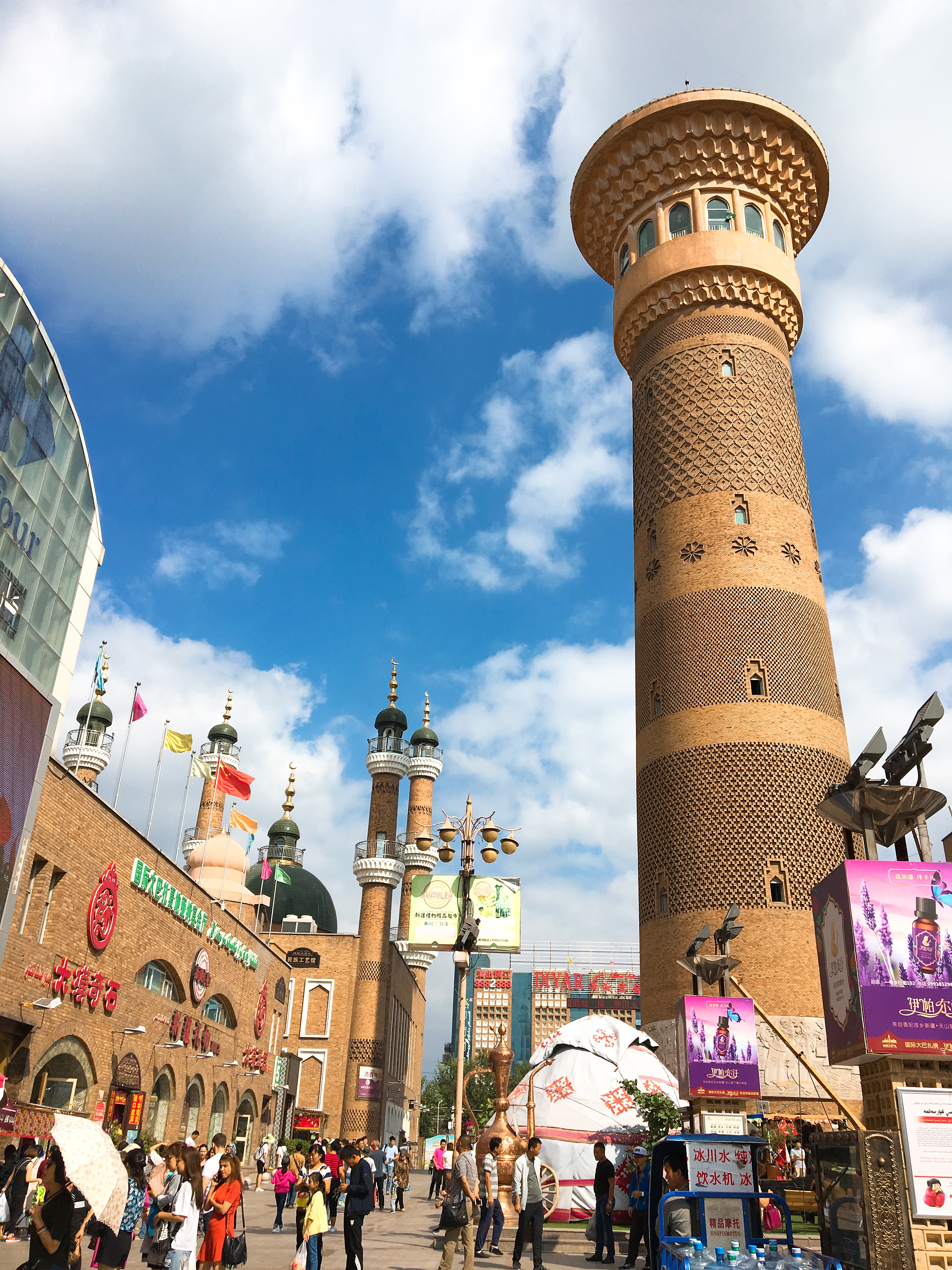
Grand Bazaar

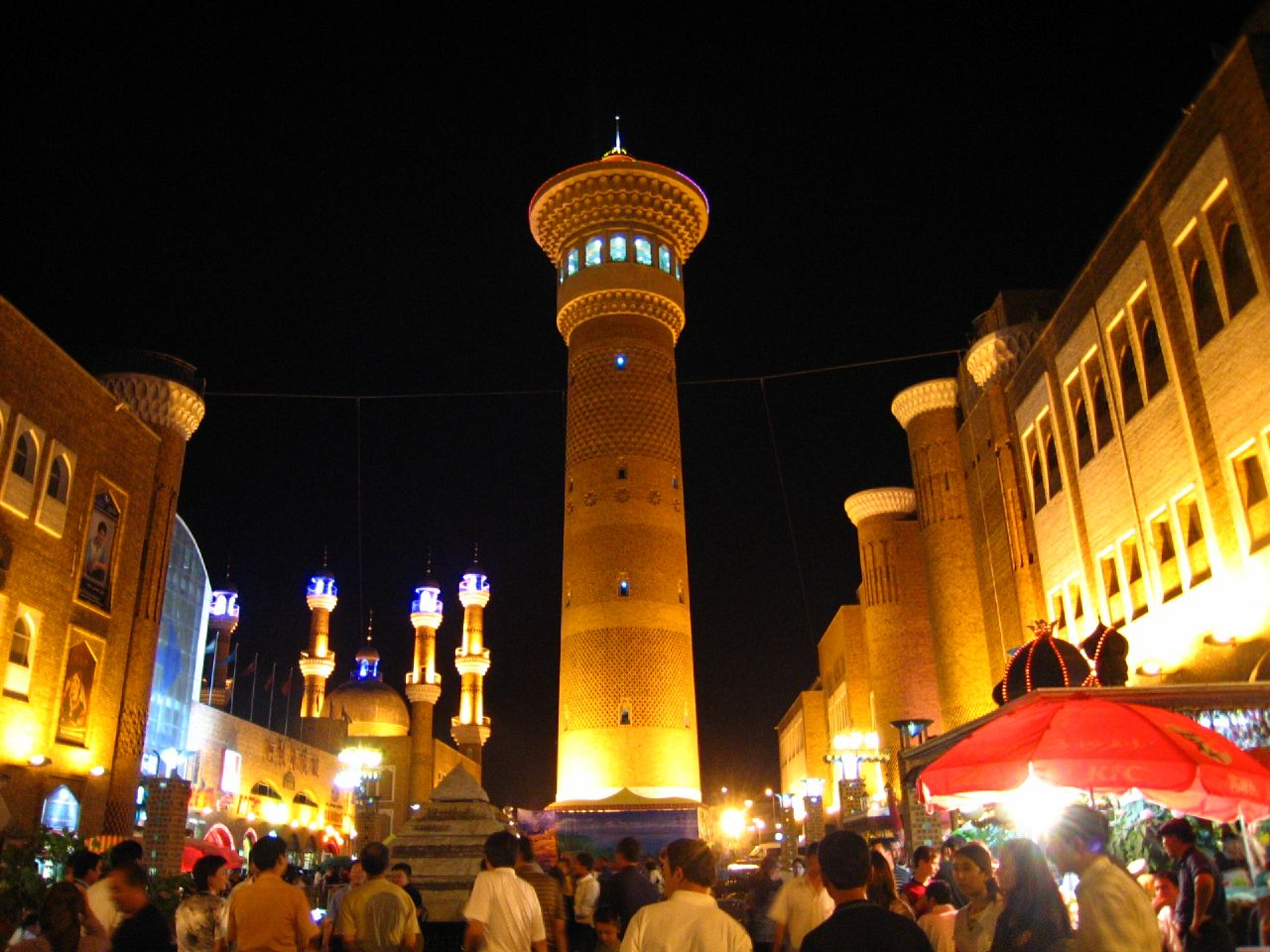
Bazaar at night

The Xinjiang International Grand Bazaar, (Note: simplified Chinese: 新疆国际大巴扎; traditional Chinese: 新疆國際大巴扎; pinyin: Xīnjiāng Guójì Dàbāzhā; Uyghur: شىنجاڭ خەلقئارا چوڭ بازىرى, romanized: Shinjang Xelq'ara Chong Baziri, Шинҗаң Хелқ'ара Чоң Базири) also known as International Grand Bazaar Xinjiang, is an Islamic bazaar in Ürümqi, Xinjiang, China. It is the largest bazaar in the world by scale, combining Islamic culture, architecture, ethnic commerce, tourism and entertainment. It is also one of the most famous landmarks in Ürümqi and in Xinjiang.

== Overview ==
The construction of the bazaar was completed in late 2002; it was opened to public on 26 June 2003, located near Erdaoqiao at South Jiefang Road (Chinese: 解放南路). The buildings and area within are constructed in an Islamic style representative of the preponderant religion and ethnic culture of the western region in China. The Bazaar is owned by Xinjiang International Grand Bazaar Co. Ltd. (Chinese: 新疆国际大巴扎有限公司).

Combined with cultures of Xinjiang ethnic minorities (e.g. Uyghur, Kazakh, Hui), architecture in the bazaar were styled Islamic with its techniques of grinded-brick-to-gap and modern facings, facilitating modern architectural functions and reflecting contemporary spirits. The bazaar reproduces the commercial prosperity of the Silk Road and embodies the ethnic characteristics and regional cultures.

The International Grand Bazaar occupies an area of 4,000 m^{2} and has an 80-metre sightseeing tower, an open mosque, an opera theatre and a food court.

The Grand Bazaar area is open all day and the store's opening hours are generally around 9:30-22:00.

== See also ==
- Ürümqi
- People's Square (Ürümqi)
