= 1989 Ürümqi unrest =

1989 riots in Xinjiang, China

- Location: People's Square, Ürümqi, Xinjiang Uyghur Autonomous Region, China
- Date: 19 May 1989 (UTC+8)
- Injuries: 150

The 1989 Ürümqi unrest, also known as the 19 May riots in Ürümqi (Chinese: 乌鲁木齐五·一九骚乱), took place in Ürümqi, the capital of Xinjiang, China, in May 1989. The unrest began with Muslim protesters marching to and attacking the Xinjiang Chinese Communist Party (CCP) office tower at People's Square on 19 May 1989. The protesters included Uyghurs, Kazakhs and other Turkic peoples, as well as Hui Chinese.

The immediate cause was a book titled Sexual Customs (性风俗) published in March 1989 which purported to describe the sexual life of Muslims and contained a number of controversial passages comparing Islamic architecture to various sexual features. This caused protests from Hui in Gansu, Ningxia and Xinjiang. The protesters, mainly Uyghur and Hui, initially conducted an orderly march in the previous days and demanded that the government should destroy Sexual Customs and punish the two authors of the book (who used the pseudonyms "Ke Le" and "Sang Ya"), who were compared to Salman Rushdie in a reference to the controversy around The Satanic Verses. However, the protester ended up rioting, where nearly 2,000 rioters overthrew cars, smashed windows and some attacked staff at a CCP office, according to government sources. The government dispatched 1,000 policemen and 1,200 armed police soldiers to disperse the crowd and arrested 173.

The protests were not limited to Ürümqi. Muslims all across China organized protests in 1989. In Beijing, 3,000 demonstrators from all ten Muslim ethnic groups in China marched on 12 May. In April 20,000 Muslims demonstrated in Lanzhou and up to 100,000 demonstrators came out in Xining. Smaller scale demonstrations took place in, Shanghai, Inner Mongolia, Wuhan, and Yunnan. In response, the Chinese government banned the book, publicly burnt 95,000 copies of it in Lanzhou, and sentenced the authors to terms in jail.

== See also ==
- July 2009 Ürümqi riots
