= People's Square (Ürümqi) =

Public square in Ürümqi, Xinjiang, China

Coordinates: 43.7939°N 87.6213°E

People's Square, Ürümqi
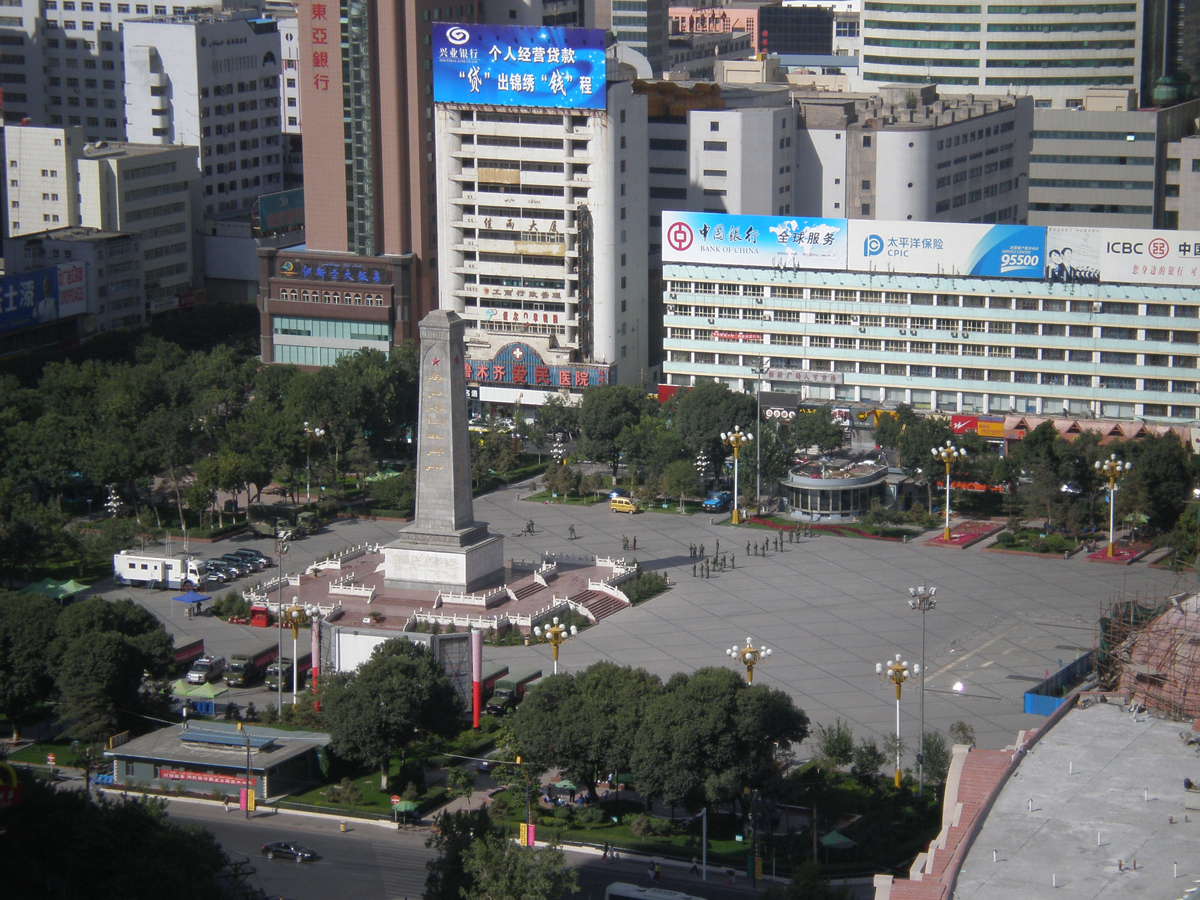
- People's Square from above

Chinese name
- Simplified Chinese: 乌鲁木齐市人民广场
- Traditional Chinese: 烏魯木齊市人民廣場
Transcriptions
Standard Mandarin
- Hanyu Pinyin: Wūlǔmùqí shì rénmín guǎngchǎng

Uyghur name
- Uyghur: ئۈرۈمچى خەلق مەيدىنى
Transcriptions
- Latin Yëziqi: Ürümchi Xelq Meydini
- Siril Yëziqi: Үрүмчи Хелқ Мейдини

People's Square is a large public square located around the major intersections of Central Business District of Ürümqi, the capital of Xinjiang Uyghur Autonomous Region, China. Located in Tianshan District, it is a primary tourist destination in the city and is also used to hold large events and serves as a general place of daily amusement for local residents.

== History ==
During the Qing dynasty, the original site was a lotus pool. In 1934, it was a property land of the supervision administration office of ROC government. The area was named "Peace Square" in 1946 when the then Xinjiang provincial government peacefully negotiated with the revolutionary governments of Ili, Tacheng and Altay and the name was changed into "People's Square" in 1950.

On May 19, 1989, unrest took place on the square, where thousands of rioters smashed windows, overthrew cars and attacked staff of the CPC office, against the building of CPC committee of the Xinjiang Uyghur Autonomous Region.

In 1995, the provincial CPC committee and the government rebuilt the Square, with a monument set on the central ground.

On June 17, 2008, the People's Square is the site of departure for the sacred flame during the 2008 Summer Olympics torch relay in Ürümqi.

On July 5, 2009, mass protests by Uyghur against the Shaoguan incident took place as the onset of the later severe rioting that killed at least 197 people.

== Landmarks ==
- Monument to the People's Liberation Army's March into Xinjiang (中国人民解放军进军新疆纪念碑) is 32.6 meters tall, on the center-south of the Square, set in 1995.

== Surroundings ==
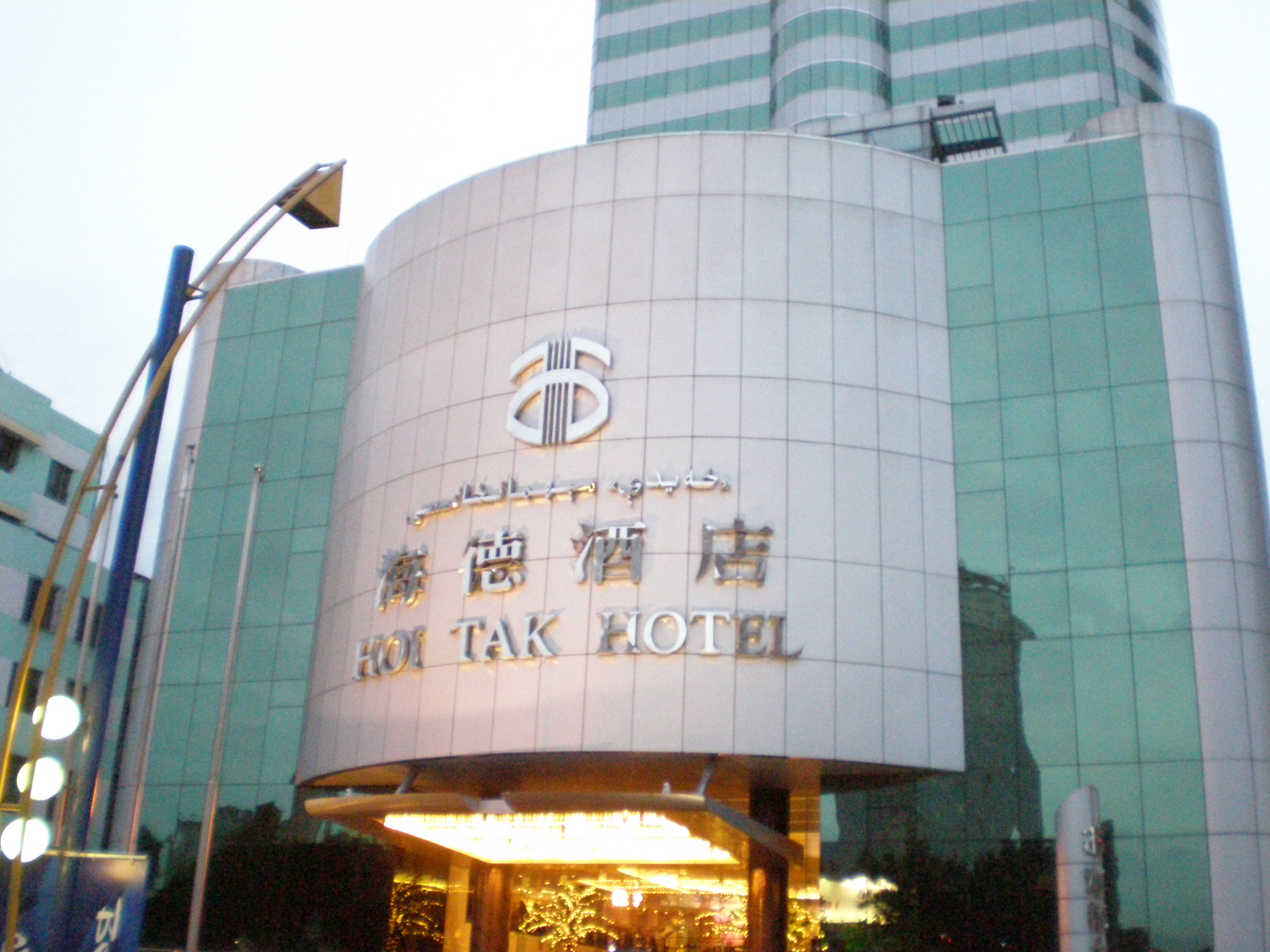
Hoi Tak Hotel

- The General Office of the CPC Xinjiang Uyghur Autonomous Region Committee (Chinese: 中国共产党新疆维吾尔自治区委员会办公厅, abbr.: CPC Committee of the Autonomous Region; Chinese abbr.: 自治区党委), a symbolic building, is located opposite to the Square on the north
- Hoi Tak Hotel (Chinese: 海德酒店; Uyghur: خەيدې مېھمانخانىسى, romanized: Heydë Mëhmanxanisi) is a 32-storey five-star hotel on the west side of the Square

== See also ==
- Ürümqi
- Xinjiang International Grand Bazaar
