= Ürümqi BRT =

Bus rapid transit system in Ürümqi, Xinjiang, China

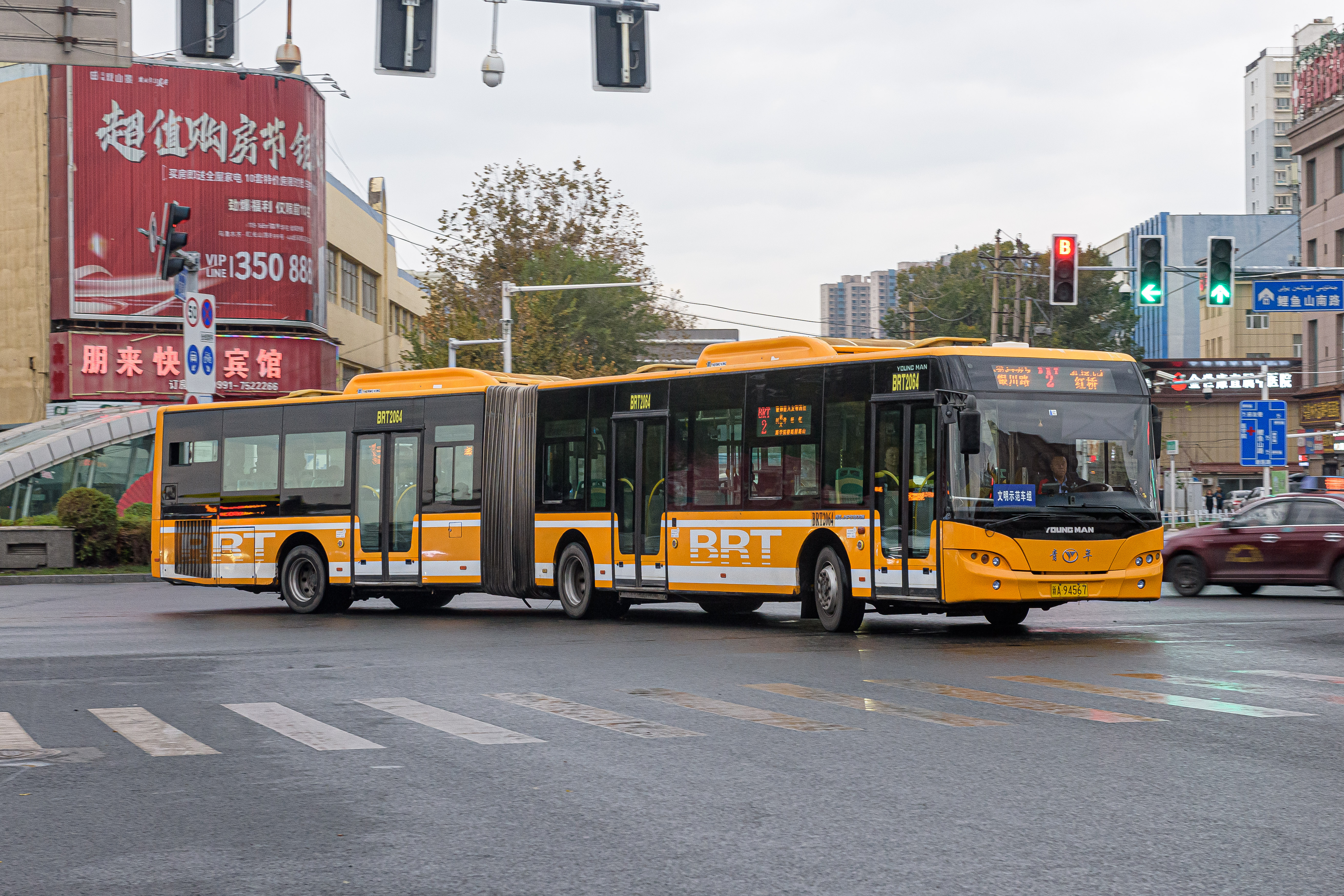
- BRT2 bus approaching to Balou

Overview
- Locale: Ürümqi
- Transit type: Bus rapid transit
- Number of lines: 4
- Number of stations: 66
- Daily ridership: 35,000

Operation
- Began operation: 2011
- Operator: Ürümqi Public Transport Group
- Number of vehicles: 552

Technical
- System length: 42.2 kilometers (26.2 mi)
- Average speed: 17.2 km/h
System map
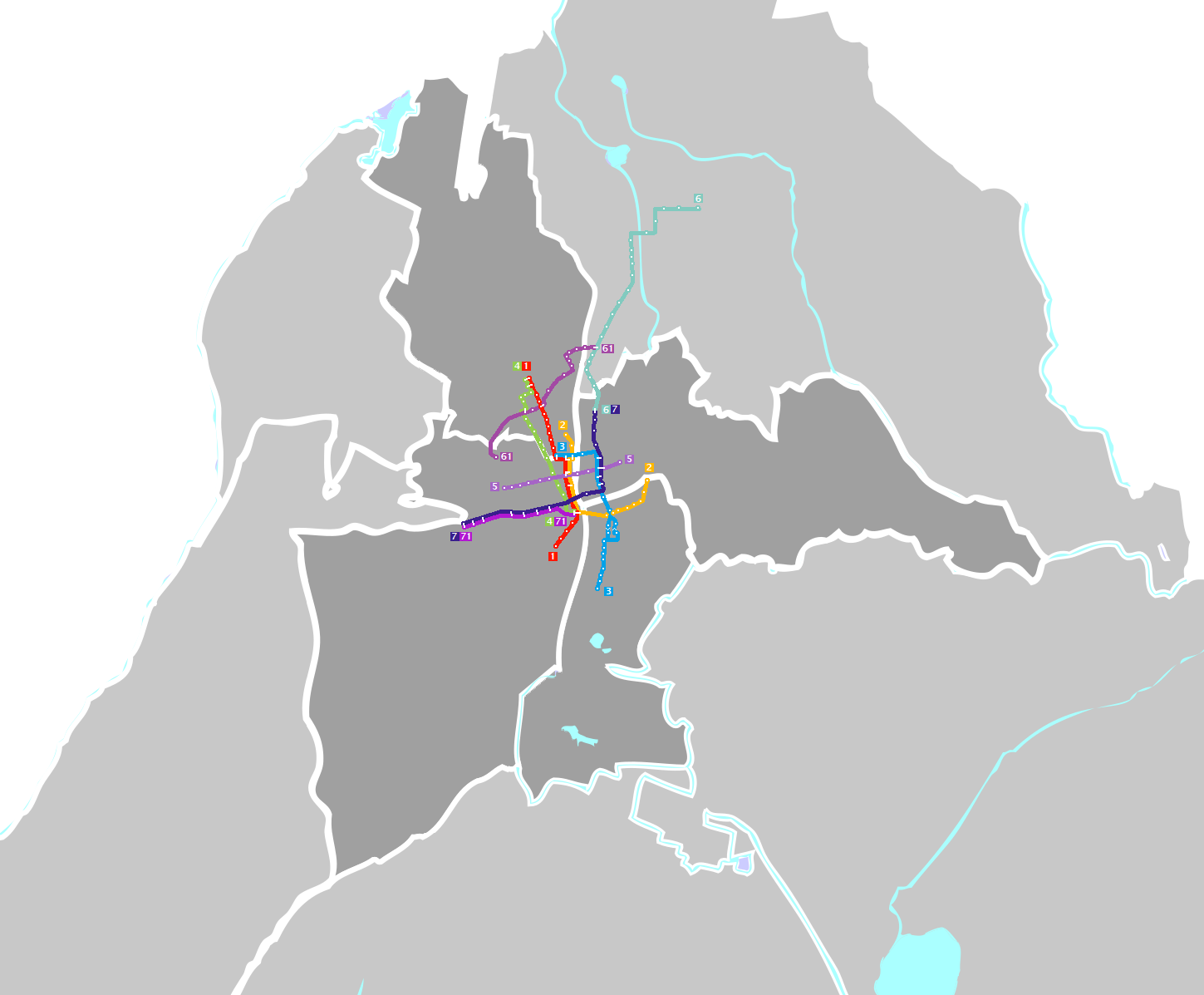

Ürümqi Bus Rapid Transit (BRT) is a bus rapid transit system in Ürümqi, Xinjiang, China. It began trial operations in August 2011 and officially began operations in September of the same year.

== Lines ==
- BRT1: 14.9 kilometers (9.3 mi) in length, 21 stations,
- BRT2: 14.1 kilometers (8.8 mi) in length, 17 stations,
- BRT3: 13.2 kilometers (8.2 mi) in length, 17 stations,
- BRT5: 9.6 kilometers (6.0 mi) in length, 11 stations.
