= Ürümqi =

Capital and largest city of Xinjiang, China

Ürümqi: 乌鲁木齐市 (Chinese); ئۈرۈمچى شەھىرى (Uyghur); Urumqi, Urumchi, Dihua, Tihwa
- Prefecture-level city
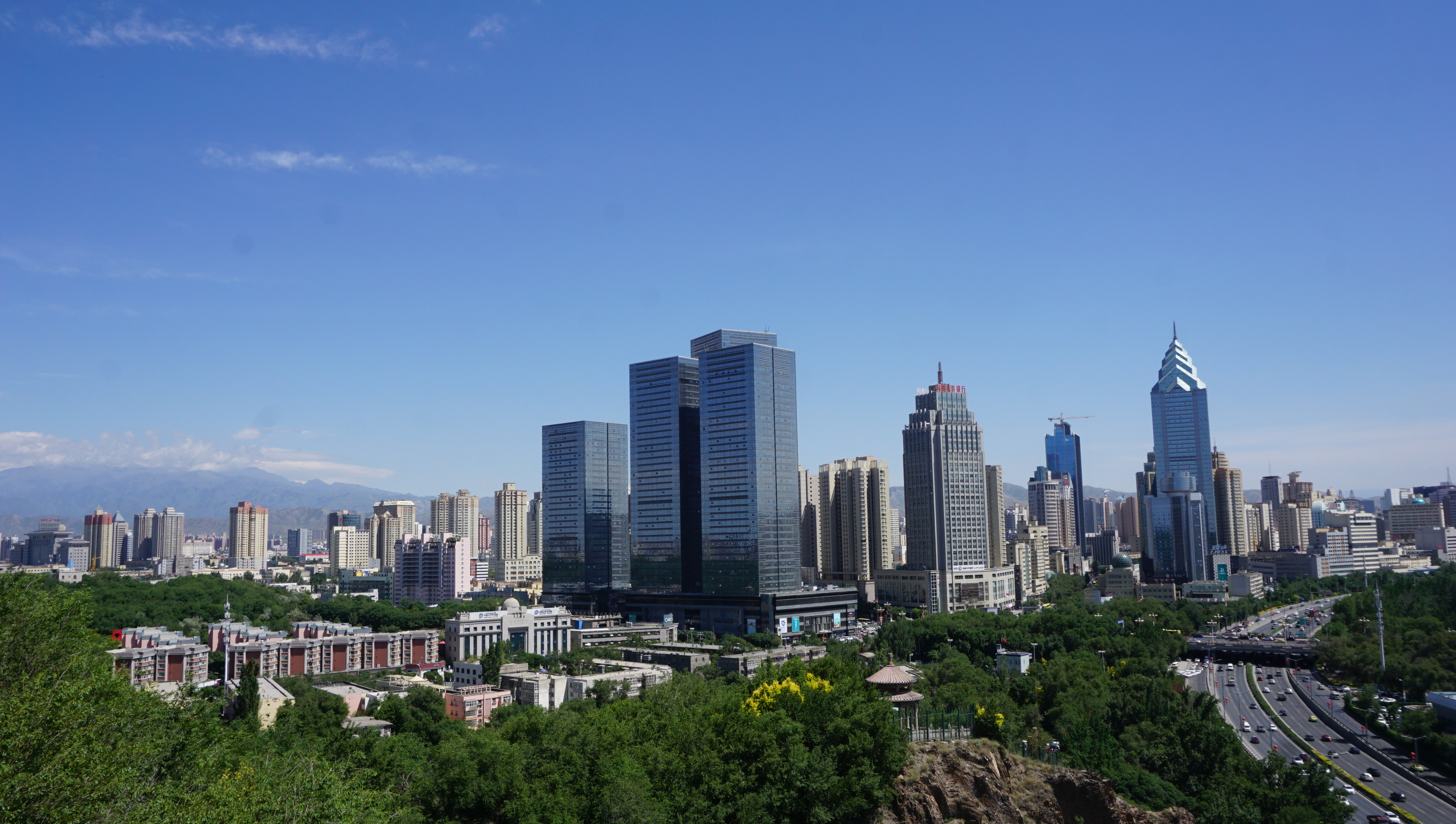
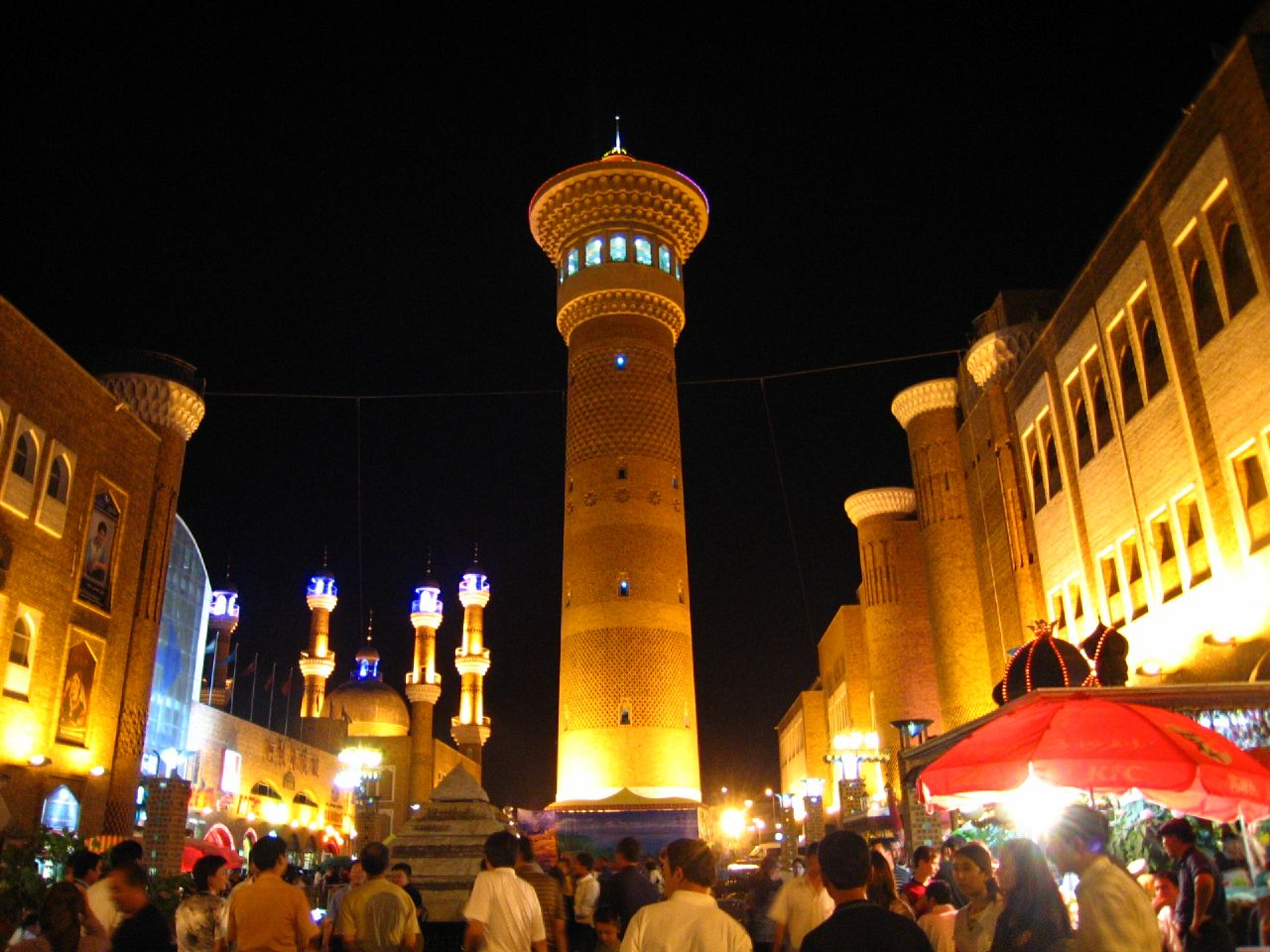
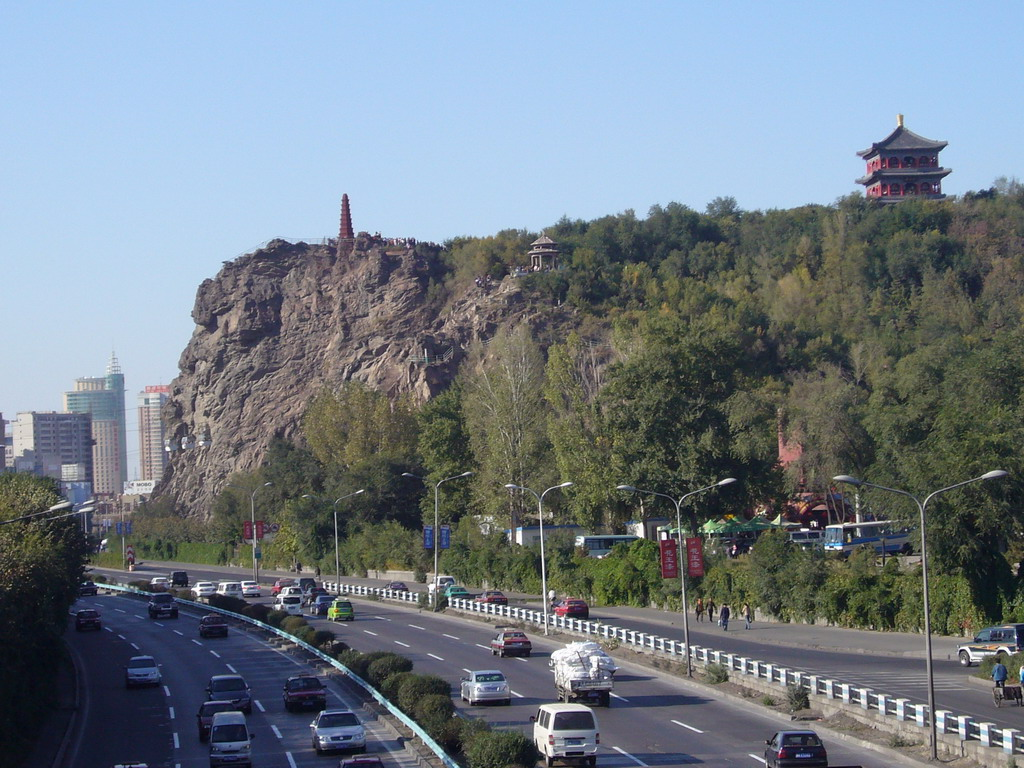
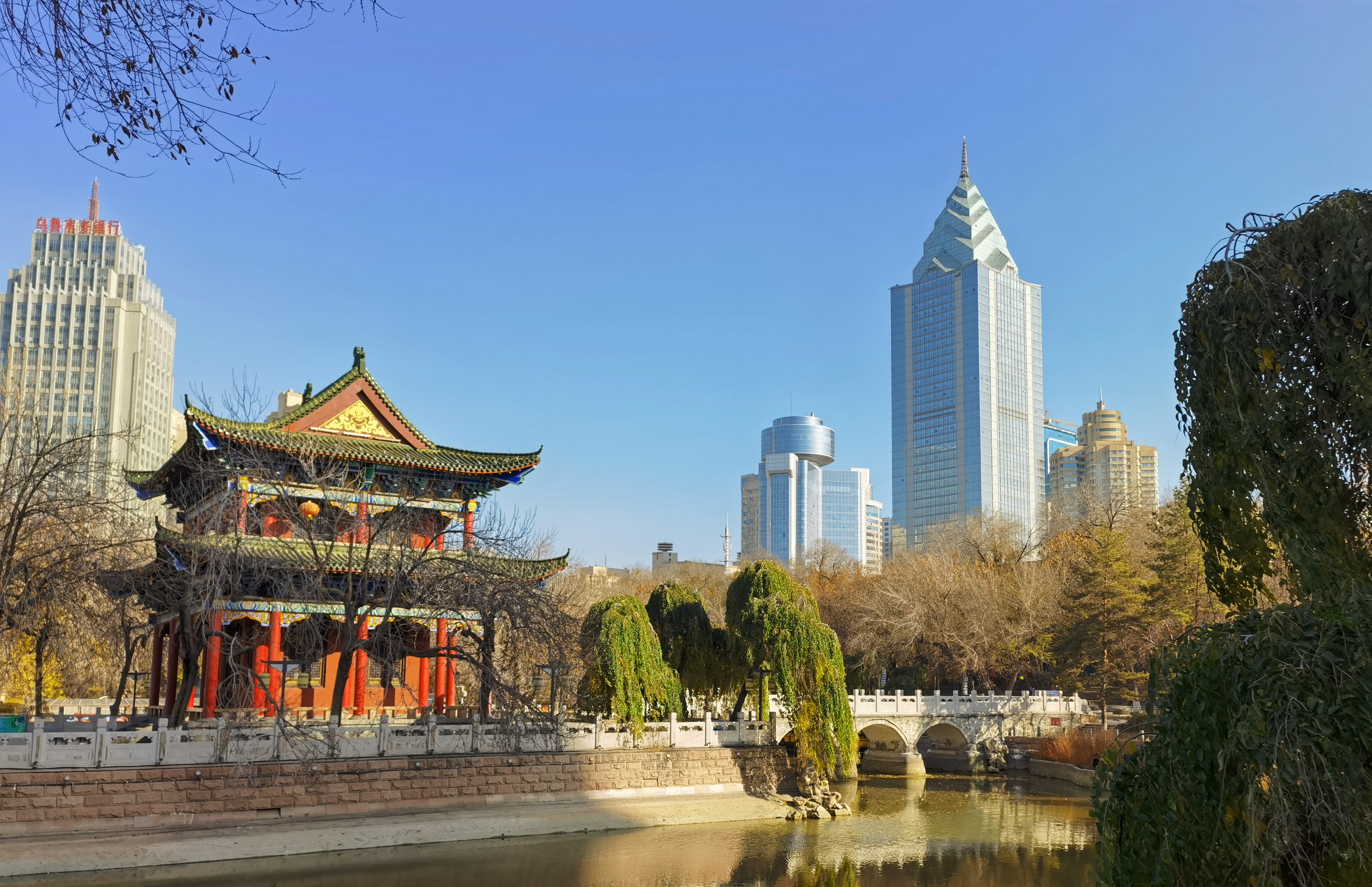
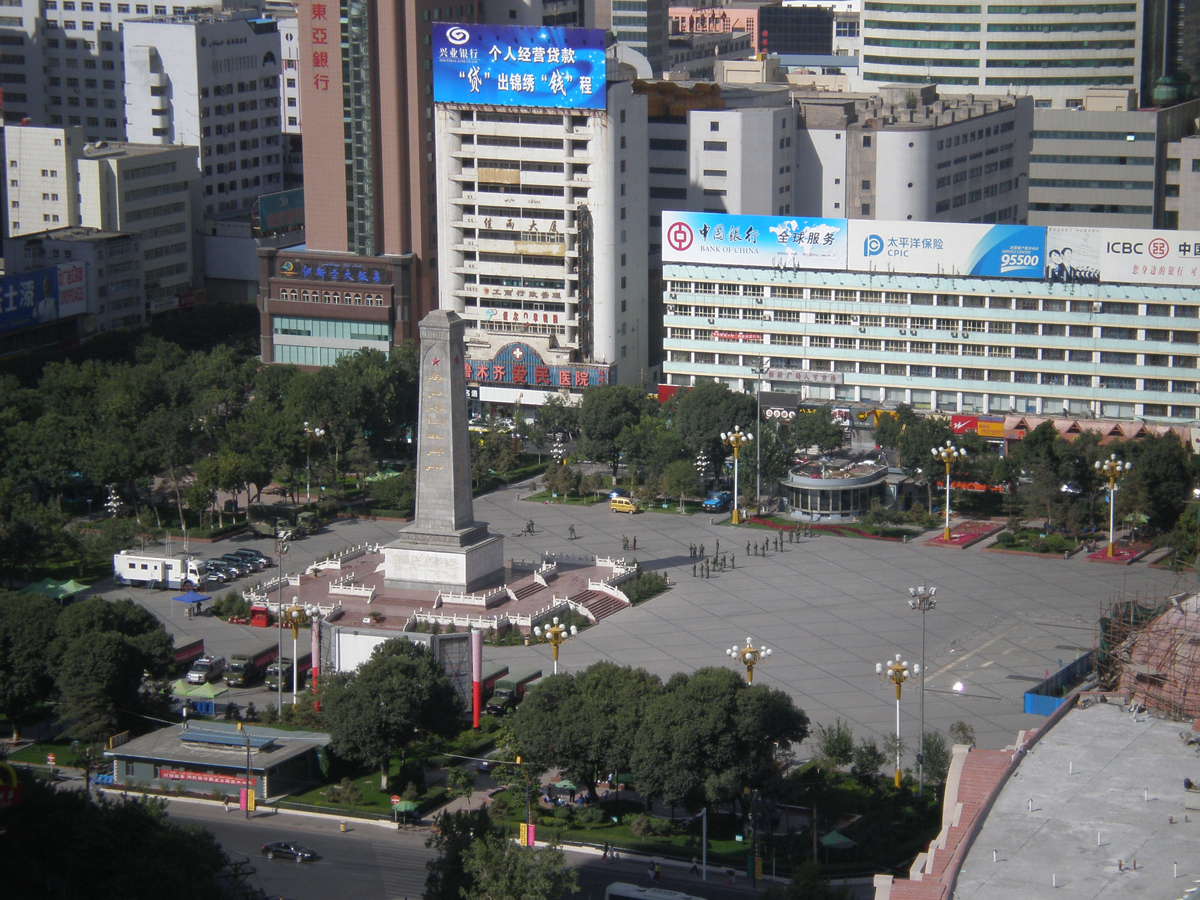
- Ürümqi skyline Ürümqi Night Market in the Grand Bazaar Red Mountain (Hong Shan) People's Park People's Square
- Etymology: From the Oirat language, meaning "beautiful pasture"; or from the Old Uyghur Yürüng-chin, meaning "white garrison"
- City limits of Ürümqi (red) in Xinjiang (orange)

- Location of the city center in Xinjiang
- Coordinates (Ürümqi municipal government): 43°49′21″N 87°36′45″E
- Country: China
- Autonomous region: Xinjiang
- County-level divisions: 8
- Municipal seat: Shuimogou District

Government
  - Type: Prefecture-level city
  - Body: Ürümqi Municipal People's Congress
  - CCP Secretary: Zhang Zhu
  - Congress Chairman: Ahmetjan Ahniyaz
  - Mayor: Yahefu Paidula
  - CPPCC Chairman: Yun Shuxia

Area
  - Prefecture-level city: 14,577 km^{2} (5,628 sq mi)
  - Urban: 583 km^{2} (225 sq mi)
- Elevation: 860 m (2,820 ft)

Population (2020 census)
  - Prefecture-level city: 4,054,000
  - Estimate (2020): 4,054,000
  - Density: 278.1/km^{2} (720.3/sq mi)

Demographics
  - Major ethnic groups: 74.9% Han Chinese; 12.5% Uyghurs

GDP
  - Prefecture-level city: CN¥ 465.8 billion US$ 65.2 billion
  - Per capita: CN¥ 112,485; US$ 15,748
- Time zone: De jure: China Standard (UTC+08:00); De facto: Both China Standard (UTC+08:00) and Ürümqi Time (UTC+06:00)
- Postal code: 830000
- Area code: 991
- ISO 3166 code: CN-XJ-01
- License plate prefixes: 新A
- Website: www.urumqi.gov.cn (in Chinese)

Ürümqi
- "Ürümqi" in Simplified Chinese (top), Traditional Chinese (middle) and Uyghur Arabic (bottom) scripts

Chinese name
- Simplified Chinese: 乌鲁木齐
- Traditional Chinese: 烏魯木齊
- Hanyu Pinyin: Wūlǔmùqí
- Postal: Urumtsi
Transcriptions
Standard Mandarin
- Hanyu Pinyin: Wūlǔmùqí
- Bopomofo: ㄨ ㄌㄨˇ ㄇㄨˋ ㄑㄧˊ
- Gwoyeu Romatzyh: Uluumuhchyi
- Wade–Giles: Wu^{1}-lu^{3}-mu^{4}-chʻi^{2}
- IPA: [ú.lù.mû.tɕʰǐ]
Yue: Cantonese
- Yale Romanization: Wūlóuhmuhkchàih
- Jyutping: Wu1lou5muk6cai4
- IPA: [wu˥.lɔw˩˧.mʊk̚˨.tsʰɐj˩]

Abbreviation
- Simplified Chinese: 乌市
- Traditional Chinese: 烏市
- Hanyu Pinyin: Wūshì
Transcriptions
Standard Mandarin
- Hanyu Pinyin: Wūshì
- Bopomofo: ㄨ ㄕˋ
- Gwoyeu Romatzyh: Ushyh
- Wade–Giles: Wu^{1}-shih^{4}
- IPA: [ú.ʂɻ̩̂]

Former name
- Chinese: 迪化
- Hanyu Pinyin: Díhuà
- Postal: Tihwa
- Literal meaning: to enlighten and civilize
Transcriptions
Standard Mandarin
- Hanyu Pinyin: Díhuà
- Bopomofo: ㄉㄧˊ ㄏㄨㄚˋ
- Gwoyeu Romatzyh: Dyihuah
- Wade–Giles: Ti^{2}-hua^{4}
- IPA: [tǐ.xwâ]

Mongolian name
- Mongolian Cyrillic: Өрөмч
- Mongolian script: ᠥᠷᠥᠮᠴᠢ

Uyghur name
- Uyghur: ئۈرۈمچى
Transcriptions
- Latin Yëziqi: Ürümchi
- Yengi Yeziⱪ: Ürümqi
- SASM/GNC: Ürümqi
- Siril Yëziqi: Үрүмчи
- Uyghur IPA: [ʏrʏmˈtʃi]

Kazakh name
- Kazakh: ءۇرىمجى; Ürimji; Үрімжі

Kyrgyz name
- Kyrgyz: ۉرۉمچۉ; Үрүмчү; Ürümçü

Ürümqi (Note: /ʊˈrʊmtʃi/ uu-RUUM-chee; also spelled Urumqi or Urumchi; Chinese: 乌鲁木齐; pinyin: Wūlǔmùqí; abbreviated 乌市; Wūshì; Uyghur: ئۈرۈمچى, romanized: Ürümchi, pronounced [ʏrʏmˈtʃi]) is the capital and largest city of the Xinjiang Uyghur Autonomous Region in Northwestern China. It is the second-largest city in China's northwestern interior after Xi'an. It is located to the west of the Tian Shan mountain ranges, and far away from other major cities in China. Ürümqi has an estimated population of over 4.5 million people, made up of predominantly Han Chinese, but it also has one of the largest Uyghur populations in China. For much of its history, Ürümqi was ruled and occupied to various extents by various Chinese dynasties, and the Uyghur people. It has been under rule by the People's Republic of China since its founding in 1954.

Ürümqi has seen significant economic development since the 1990s. Today, it serves as an economic centre for the western Chinese region, home to the conglomerate Xinjiang Guanghui Industry Investment Group. Xinjiang University and Xinjiang Normal University both are based in Ürümqi, as well as the Xinjiang Astronomical Observatory. It is served by Ürümqi Tianshan International Airport and is connected by various metro and BRT lines. The city is also connected to the wider Chinese high speed rail network.

== Etymology ==
According to Herold J Wiens, the name "Ürümqi" (Oirat: [yrəm t͡ʃə]) comes from the Oirat words ürü and mchi, together meaning "beautiful pasture".

The Qing dynasty took Ürümqi in 1755, during its conquest of the Dzungar Khanate. Qing settlers expanded the town into a walled city from 1763 to 1767, and upon completing the expansion renamed the city Dihua (Chinese: 迪化; previously romanized as Tihwa), meaning "to enlighten and civilize". The Chinese Communist Party restored the name "Ürümqi" on 1 February 1954, believing Dihua to be a belittling and ethnically chauvinist name.

== History ==
=== Early period ===
During prehistory, the site of the future Ürümqi was occupied by a nomadic people known in Chinese accounts as the Jushi, who lived mainly on the northern slopes of the surrounding Tianshan Mountains. The Jushi are often regarded as likely precursors of the Tocharian peoples, who later established city states in the Tarim Basin, south of the present site of Ürümqi.

The oldest known settlement, a town called Urabo, was located about 10 kilometres (6.2 miles) from the southern suburbs of the present-day Ürümqi.

Han Chinese states, located to the east, exerted increasing control of the Tarim Basin. Under the name Luntai, the city was founded by the Tang government, in 648 CE, the 22nd year of Emperor Taizong's reign, as part of the Protectorate General to Pacify the West. It was a seat of local government and collected taxes from the caravans along the northern route of the Silk Road.

After the Tang retreated from the Western Regions, the region came under the control of the Uyghurs of the Khaganate and Gaochang / Qocho. There is little information about the Ürümqi area during the time between the Tang and Qing dynasties, and researchers generally believe that there were no permanent settlements there for most of this period. The Mongols referred to the wider area as Bishbalik, meaning five cities, a reference to the five towns that surrounded the present-day Ürümqi area.

=== Dzungar period ===
The Oirat-speaking Dzungar tribes that formed the Dzungar Khanate were the last major power to control Ürümqi before the Manchus gained control of Xinjiang. During the Ming dynasty, there was a record of a place at Jiujiawan 5 kilometres (3.1 miles) to the west of present Ürümqi, which may have been the Dzungar town that was later destroyed during the Qing conquest. The Mongolians also used the area as herding ground in this period. Steppe peoples had used the location, the pass between the Bogda Shan to the east and the Tian Shan to the west, connecting the Dzungar Basin to the north and the Turpan Depression to the south.

Ürümqi remained a small town of lesser importance than the oasis and Silk Road trade center Turpan 200 km (120 mi) to the southeast. Fighting for the control of Dzungaria led to the Khoshuuts (now classified as Mongols) leaving Ürümqi for Qinghai and Tibet in the 1620s and 1630s.

=== Qing rule ===
In the 18th century, the Qing went to war against the Dzungar Khanate. Ürümqi was taken by the Qing in 1755, and the Dzungars of the region were eliminated in the Dzungar genocide. One writer, Wei Yuan, described the resulting desolation in what became northern Xinjiang as "an empty plain for a thousand li, with no trace of man". A fort was built (either in 1755 or 1758 depending on sources), and the Qing then established garrisons of Manchu and Mongol bannermen and Han Chinese troops at Ürümqi. After 1759, the Qing government established state farms in the under-populated areas around Ürümqi, where there was fertile, well-watered land. Manchu soldiers also constructed a temple with red walls dedicated to Guandi on Pingding mountain overlooking Ürümqi, which gave Ürümqi the nickname "Red Temple".

The Manchus began to construct a walled city in 1763 to the south of the first fort, and it was completed in 1767. The Qianlong Emperor named the new settlement "Dihua" (Chinese: 迪化; pinyin: Díhuà; Manchu: Wen de dahabure fu), meaning "to enlighten and civilize". In 1771, another city named Gongning Cheng (鞏寧城) was built nearby to the northwest to house Manchu bannermen, and this would become the seat of government. The bannermen settlement to the west was commonly referred to as "Mancheng" (滿城; 'Manchu City'), while Dihua to the east became a Han Chinese town commonly called "Hancheng" (漢城; 'Han City'). The Ürümqi of the early period was therefore a twin-city, with Gongning Cheng forming the administrative center while Dihua grew into Xinjiang's commercial and financial center.

Han Chinese from all over China moved into Dihua, as did Chinese Hui Muslims from the areas of Gansu and Shaanxi. The origin of Hui in Ürümqi is often indicated by the names of their mosques. By 1762, more than 500 shops had already been opened by Chinese migrants to the area of modern-day Ürümqi. Those Qing literati who visited Dihua were impressed by its cultural sophistication and similarity to eastern China. The writer Ji Yun compared Dihua to Beijing, in that both had numerous wine shops which offered daily performances of Chinese music and dance.

In 1870, the Battle of Ürümqi took place between the Turkic Muslim forces of Yaqub Beg against the Dungan Muslim forces of Tuo Ming (Daud Khalifa). With the help of Xu Xuegong's Han Chinese militia, Yaqub Beg's forces defeated the Dungans. Gongning Cheng was captured, its Qing administrator killed, and the city burnt to the ground and abandoned. The Qing later regained control of Ürümqi. In 1884, the Guangxu Emperor established Xinjiang as a province, with Dihua as its capital.

=== Republican era ===
After the collapse of the Qing dynasty, Xinjiang was ruled from Ürümqi by a succession of warlords: Yang Zengxin (1911–1928), Jin Shuren (1928–1933), Sheng Shicai (1933–1942), and Zhang Zhizhong (1942–1949) as governor of Xinjiang. Of these, Yang and Sheng were considered capable rulers.

During the Kumul Rebellion, the First Battle of Ürümqi and the Second Battle of Ürümqi took place between the forces of Ma Zhongying's 36th Division (National Revolutionary Army) and Jin Shuren and Sheng Shicai's provincial forces. At the second battle, Ma was assisted by the Han Chinese General Zhang Peiyuan.

=== People's Republic era ===
On 1 February 1954, following the founding of the People's Republic of China, the city's name was officially changed back to Ürümqi. The ruling Chinese Communist Party believed that the name "Dihua", which literally means "to enlighten and civilize", was belittling and ethnically chauvinist.

Ürümqi became the de facto political and economic capital of Xinjiang in 1962, following protests against Chinese rule in the previous capital Yining (Ghulja). In what came to be known as the Yi–Ta incident, 60,000 Chinese citizens left Yining and Tacheng for the Soviet Union, prompting the Chinese government to move its administrative buildings and industrial focus from Yining to Ürümqi. The Chinese government also began construction on a railway connecting Ürümqi to China proper in the east. As a result, Xinjiang was culturally and economically reoriented away from Central Asia and toward China proper.

In the late 1970s, Deng Xiaoping relaxed China's tight control over Xinjiang, and Ürümqi benefited from the development of the oil and gas industry in Xinjiang.

New mosques were built in Ürümqi with financial assistance from the Chinese government. While the Chinese government implemented strict rules on religion in southern Xinjiang, the treatment of the Uyghurs and their religion in Ürümqi were more lax and permissive.

In May 1989, unrest in Ürümqi resulted in 150 injuries. In February 1997, bombings in Ürümqi following the Ghulja incident resulted in 20 deaths and scores of injuries.

==== July 2009 riots and subsequent unrest ====
In the largest eruption of ethnic violence in China in decades, there were riots in July 2009 between ethnic Han Chinese and Uyghurs. The New York Times reporter covering the riot described the violence as "clashes with riot police and Uyghurs rampaging through the city and killing Han civilians. Then, for at least three days, bands of Han vigilantes roamed Ürümqi, attacking and killing Uyghurs." Before the riot broke out, young Uyghurs had marched through the city "to protest a case of judicial discrimination". According to official figures, most of the 197 killed in the riot were Han, a statement which New York Times reporter Edward Wong says is disputed by Uyghurs.

== Geography ==
The largest city in western China, Ürümqi has earned a place in the Guinness Book of Records as the most remote city from any sea in the world. It is about 2,500 kilometres (1,600 mi) from the nearest coastline as Ürümqi is the closest major city to the Eurasian pole of inaccessibility, although Karamay and Altay, both in Xinjiang, are closer. The city has an administrative area of 10,989 square kilometres (4,243 sq mi) and has an average elevation of 800 metres (2,600 ft).

The location 43°40′52″N 87°19′52″E in the southwestern suburbs of Ürümqi (Ürümqi County) was designated by local geography experts as the "center point of Asia" in 1992, and a monument to this effect was erected there in the 1990s. The site is a local tourist attraction.

=== Water supply ===
Although surrounded by deserts (the Gurbantünggüt in the north and the Taklamakan in the south), the Ürümqi area is naturally watered by a number of small rivers flowing from the snow-capped Tian Shan mountains: the main range of the Tian Shan in south of the city (Ürümqi County), and the Bogda Shan east of the city (Dabancheng District).

There are 20,000 glaciers in Xinjiang – nearly half of all the glaciers in China. Since the 1950s, Xinjiang's glaciers have retreated by between 21 percent to 27 percent due to global warming. Tianshan Glacier No. 1 (一号冰川), origin of Ürümqi River, is the largest glacier near a major city in China, but has already split into two smaller glaciers.

As the Ürümqi region's population and economy are growing, the water demand exceeds the natural supply. To alleviate water shortages, the Irtysh–Ürümqi Canal was constructed in the first decade of the 21st century. The canal's main trunk terminates in the so-called "Reservoir 500" ("500"水库; 44°12′00″N 87°49′00″E) in the far north-eastern suburbs of the city (on the border of Ürümqi's suburban Midong District and Fukang City). A new industrial area, called Ganquanbao Industrial Park (甘泉堡工业园), or Industrial New City 500 (500工业新城) was being developed in 2009, west of the reservoir, relying on it for water supply. From the reservoir area water is further distributed over a network of canals throughout the lower Midong District.

=== Climate ===
Ürümqi lies on the boundary between a humid continental climate (Köppen: Dfa, Trewartha: Dcac) and a cool semi-arid climate (Köppen: BSk, Trewartha: BSac). It sees vast differences between summer and winter temperatures, featuring very warm to hot summers, with a July daily average of 24.2 °C (75.6 °F), and frigid winters, with a January daily average of −12.2 °C (10.0 °F). The annual average temperature is 7.8 °C (46.0 °F). Although the cityʼs summers are slightly wetter than its winters, sunny weather is much more likely in the hotter months, and relative humidity is the lowest during summer. With monthly percent possible sunshine ranging from 33 percent in December to 75 percent in September, the city receives 2,643 hours of bright sunshine annually. Its annual precipitation is about 365 millimetres (14.4 in). Extremes since 1951 have ranged from −41.5 °C (−42.7 °F) on 27 February 1951 to 42.1 °C (107.8 °F) on 1 August 1973.

Climate data for Ürümqi, elevation 935 m (3,068 ft), (1991–2020 normals, extremes 1951–present)
Month	Jan	Feb	Mar	Apr	May	Jun	Jul	Aug	Sep	Oct	Nov	Dec	Year
Record high °C (°F)	9.9 (49.8)	13.5 (56.3)	25.6 (78.1)	32.5 (90.5)	37.0 (98.6)	40.9 (105.6)	41.0 (105.8)	42.1 (107.8)	37.0 (98.6)	30.5 (86.9)	22.0 (71.6)	15.6 (60.1)	42.1 (107.8)
Mean maximum °C (°F)	1.1 (34.0)	3.9 (39.0)	17.5 (63.5)	28.5 (83.3)	33.1 (91.6)	36.3 (97.3)	37.8 (100.0)	37.4 (99.3)	32.8 (91.0)	24.9 (76.8)	13.9 (57.0)	3.5 (38.3)	38.6 (101.5)
Mean daily maximum °C (°F)	−7.4 (18.7)	−4.3 (24.3)	5.3 (41.5)	17.4 (63.3)	23.4 (74.1)	28.2 (82.8)	30.1 (86.2)	29.0 (84.2)	23.1 (73.6)	14.2 (57.6)	3.3 (37.9)	−4.8 (23.4)	13.1 (55.6)
Daily mean °C (°F)	−12.2 (10.0)	−8.9 (16.0)	0.4 (32.7)	11.5 (52.7)	17.3 (63.1)	22.4 (72.3)	24.2 (75.6)	22.9 (73.2)	17.2 (63.0)	8.8 (47.8)	−0.9 (30.4)	−9.2 (15.4)	7.8 (46.0)
Mean daily minimum °C (°F)	−15.7 (3.7)	−12.3 (9.9)	−3.2 (26.2)	6.6 (43.9)	12.2 (54.0)	17.4 (63.3)	19.3 (66.7)	17.9 (64.2)	12.3 (54.1)	4.6 (40.3)	−4 (25)	−12.6 (9.3)	3.5 (38.4)
Mean minimum °C (°F)	−24.1 (−11.4)	−22.3 (−8.1)	−14.6 (5.7)	−2.5 (27.5)	3.8 (38.8)	9.1 (48.4)	12.2 (54.0)	10.9 (51.6)	4.6 (40.3)	−4.0 (24.8)	−15.7 (3.7)	−21.4 (−6.5)	−25.9 (−14.6)
Record low °C (°F)	−34.1 (−29.4)	−41.5 (−42.7)	−33.4 (−28.1)	−14.9 (5.2)	−2.4 (27.7)	4.6 (40.3)	8.8 (47.8)	5.0 (41.0)	−5.0 (23.0)	−12.4 (9.7)	−36.6 (−33.9)	−38.3 (−36.9)	−41.5 (−42.7)
Average precipitation mm (inches)	19.0 (0.75)	13.6 (0.54)	18.8 (0.74)	38.3 (1.51)	41.3 (1.63)	48.8 (1.92)	35.4 (1.39)	30.4 (1.20)	29.8 (1.17)	23.8 (0.94)	23.7 (0.93)	25.3 (1.00)	348.2 (13.72)
Average precipitation days (≥ 0.1 mm)	8.1	7.3	5.5	6.7	6.8	7.2	8.0	6.3	4.4	4.8	6.6	9.6	81.3
Average snowy days	13.6	12.6	7.6	2.8	0.3	0	0	0	0.1	2.1	8.4	14.8	62.3
Average relative humidity (%)	77	77	68	45	41	41	43	42	43	54	72	78	57
Mean monthly sunshine hours	101.8	129.7	203.2	261.4	301.9	300.8	306.1	301.1	275.2	234.5	137.0	90.5	2,643.2
Percentage possible sunshine	35	43	54	64	66	65	66	71	75	71	48	33	58
Source: China Meteorological Administration

== Cityscape ==
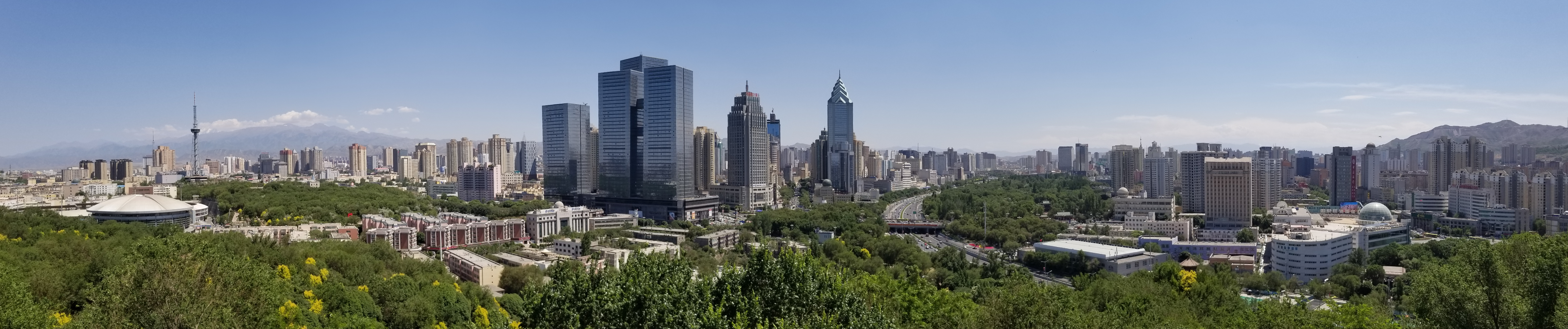
Urumqi Skyline, from Hongshan Park, in 2018

=== Air quality and pollution ===
Blacksmith Institute mentioned Ürümqi in 2007 World's Worst Polluted Places caused by air pollution along with Linfen and Lanzhou, all in China. In 2008, Toronto Star listed Ürümqi as one of the top ten worst places to live in the world due to sulphurous pollution. Heavy haze is extremely common in winter, which frequently affects air traffic. Officials believed that severe winter air pollution in Ürümqi is mainly caused by energy-heavy industries and the outdated coal-firing winter heating system.

According to a report by Department of Environmental Science and Engineering of Fudan University, the average PM_{2.5} and TSP concentrations in the winter of 2007 were 12 times higher than USA standard for PM_{2.5} and 3 times the National Ambient Air Quality Standard of China for TSP. The sulfur dioxide from industrial emissions mixed with the local anthropogenic aerosol with the transported soil dust from outside the city were the main sources of the high concentration of sulfate, one of the main factors causing the heavy air pollution over Ürümqi.

=== Timing of sunrise ===
Because of the use of a single time zone for all of China, in Ürümqi which is at a far western location in China, the sun is 2 hours and 10 minutes behind China Standard Time (CST = UTC+8). During early January the sun does not rise until 09:45 and it sets between 18:45 and 19:10 local time. In September and March, the sun rises around 08:00, and sets around 19:45. However, in June the sun rises at about 06:25 and does not set until 21:45.

== Administrative divisions ==
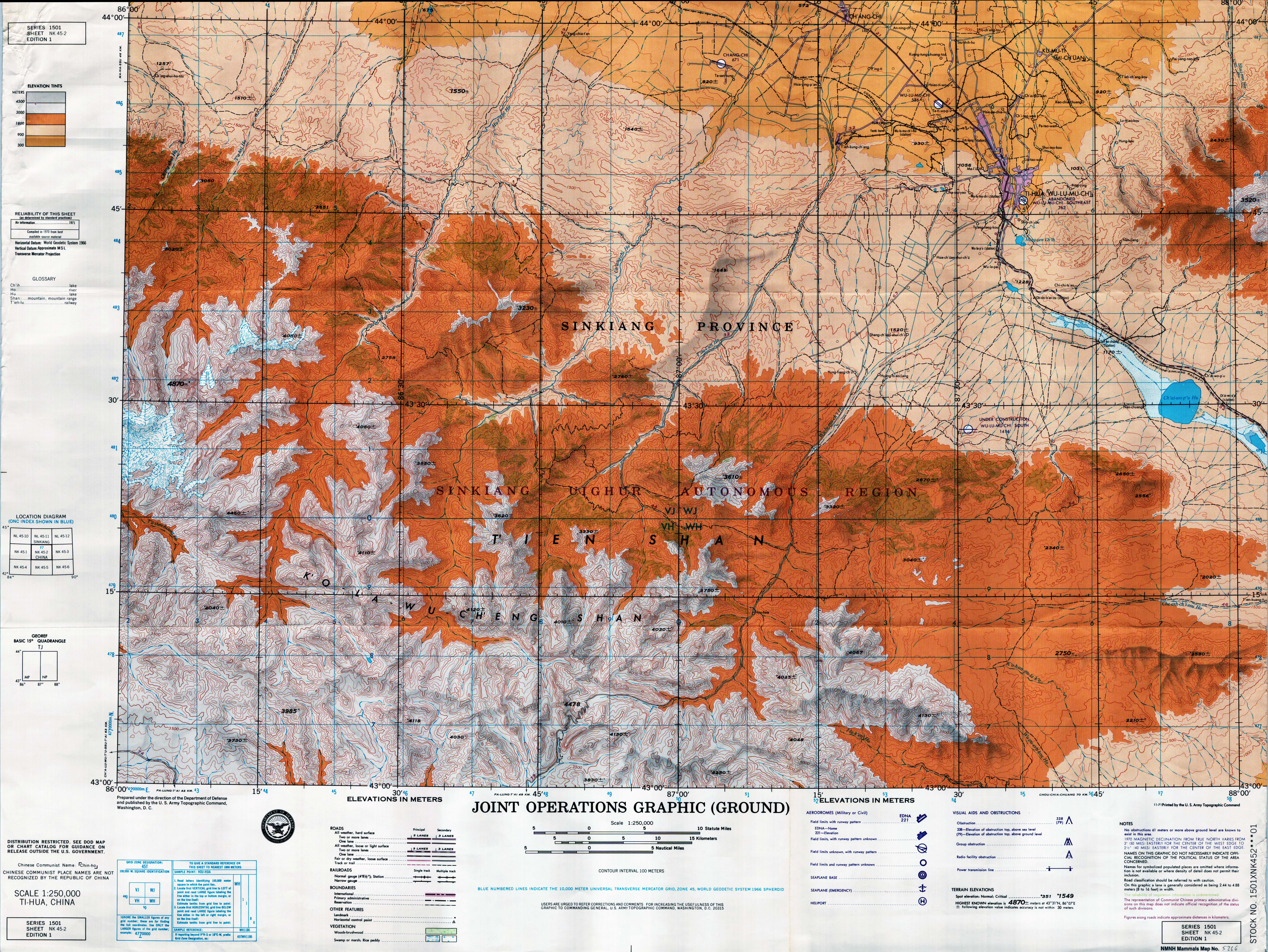
Map including Ürümqi (labeled as TI-HUA (WU-LU-MU-CH'I)) (ATC, 1971)

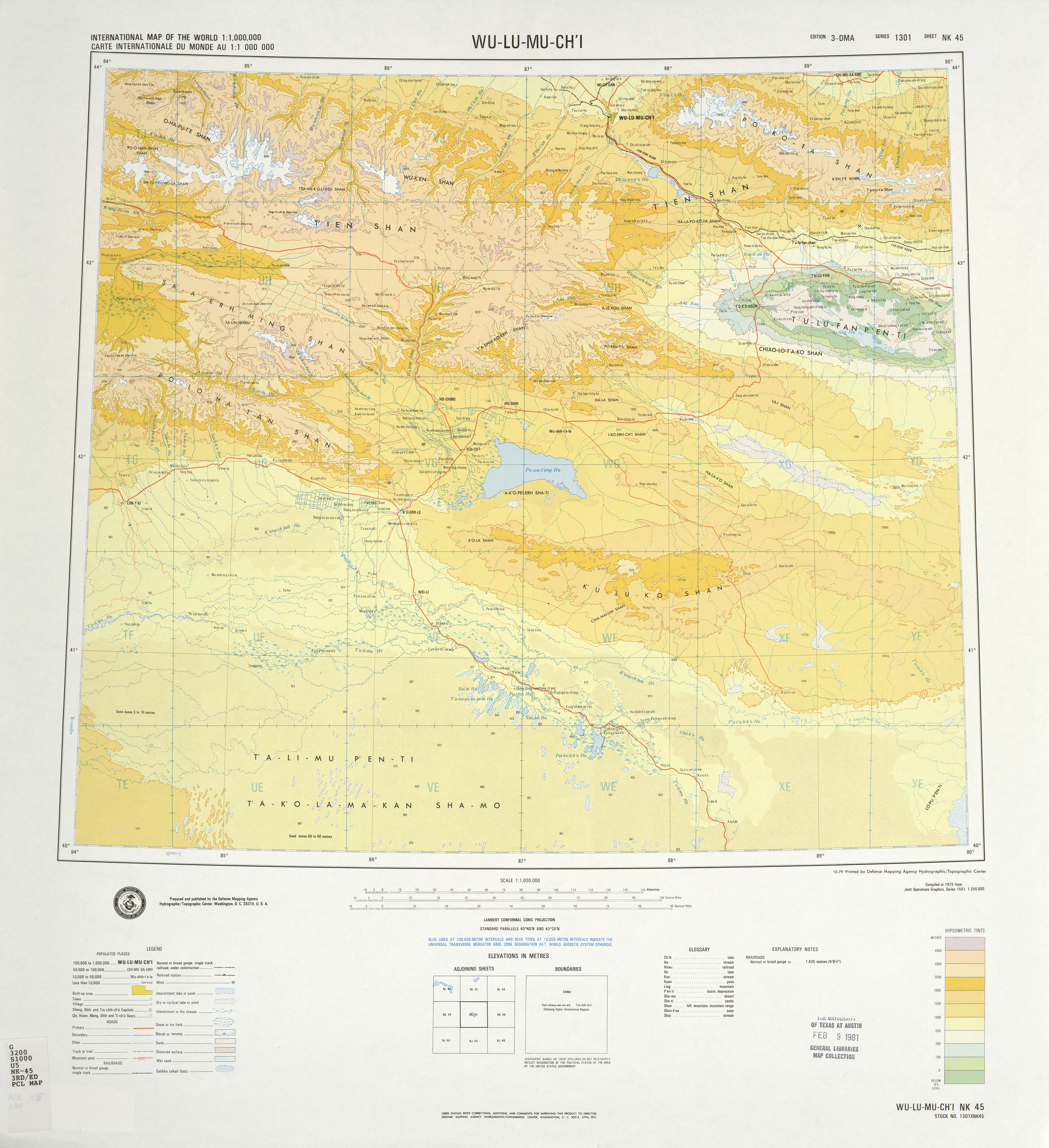
Map including Ürümqi (labeled as WU-LU-MU-CH'I) and nearby areas from the International Map of the World (1975)

Ürümqi currently comprises 8 county-level subdivisions: 7 districts and 1 county.

Map
Name	Simplified Chinese	Hanyu Pinyin	Uyghur (UEY)	Uyghur Latin (ULY)	Population (2010)	Area (km^{2})	Density ( / km^{2})
City proper
Tianshan District	天山区	Tiānshān Qū	تەڭرىتاغ رايونى	Tengritagh Rayoni	696,277	171	4071.79
Saybag District	沙依巴克区	Shāyībākè Qū	سايباغ رايونى	Saybagh Rayoni	664,716	422	1575.15
Xinshi District	新市区	Xīnshì Qū	يېڭىشەھەر رايونى	Yëngisheher Rayoni	730,307	143	5107.04
Shuimogou District	水磨沟区	Shuǐmògōu Qū	بۇلاقتاغ رايونى	Bulaqtagh Rayoni	390,943	92	4249.38
Suburban
Toutunhe District	头屯河区	Tóutúnhé Qū	تۇدۇڭخابا رايونى	Tudungxaba Rayoni	172,796	276	626.07
Dabancheng District	达坂城区	Dábǎnchéng Qū	داۋانچىڭ رايونى	Dawanching Rayoni	40,657	5,188	7.83
Midong District	米东区	Mǐdōng Qū	مىدوڭ رايونى	Midong Rayoni	333,676	3,594	92.84
Rural
Ürümqi County	乌鲁木齐县	Wūlǔmùqí Xiàn	ئۈرۈمچى ناھىيىسى	Ürümchi Nahiyisi	83,187	4,332	19.20

== Demographics ==
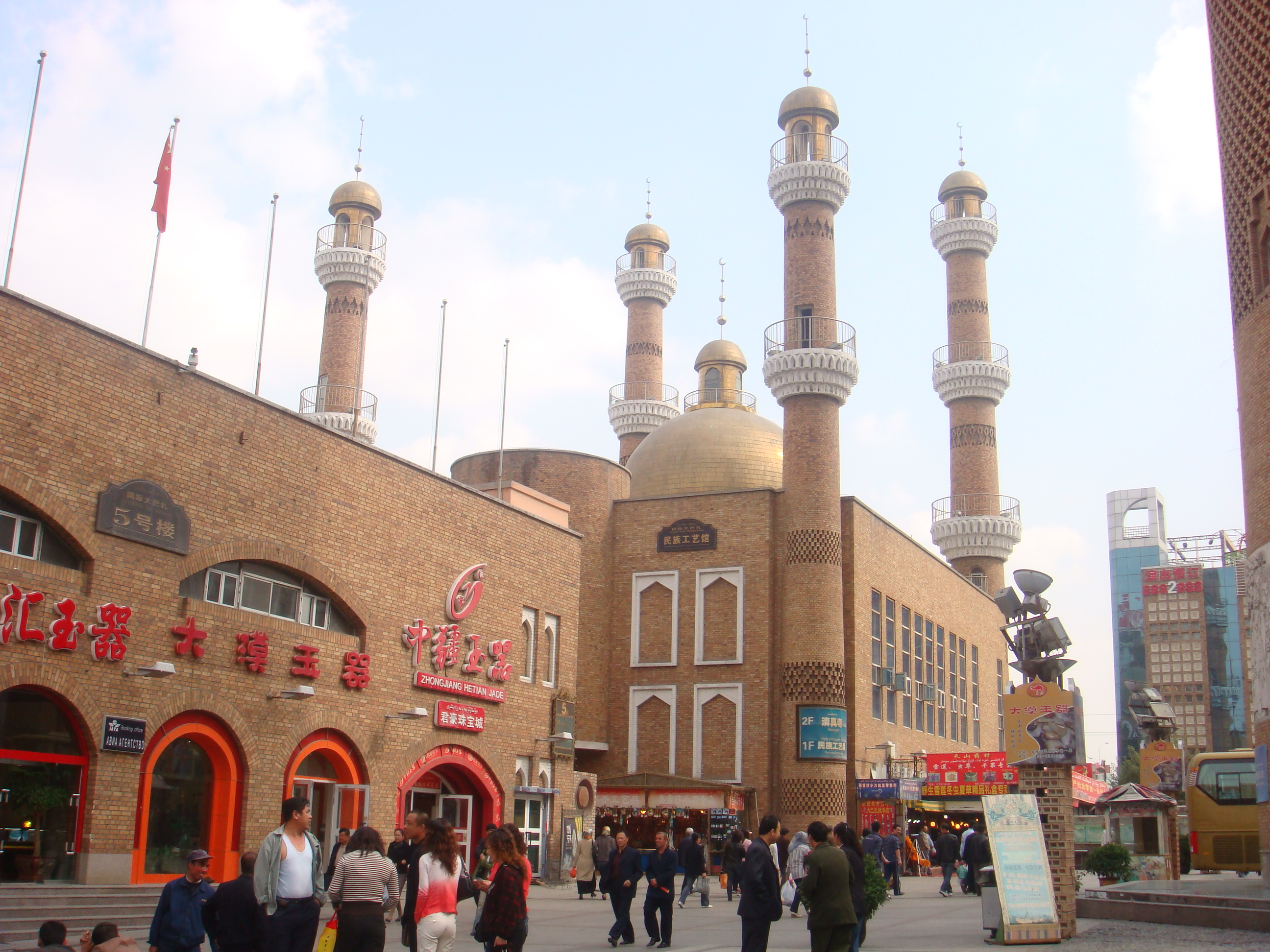
The Grand Bazaar

Ürümqi has been a multiethnic city from the time of the Qing conquest; in the early years, the Manchus lived in Gongning Cheng, Han Chinese in Dihua and various other ethnic groups such as the Hui, Uyghurs and others in the suburban districts. Muslims settled to the south of the walled-city of Dihua, and although the walls have since been demolished, the Muslims are still concentrated there.

A census in 1787 showed that there were 114,348 Hui and Han in the prefectures of Zhenxi (which included Barköl and Hami) and Ürümqi. In Ürümqi city itself, there were 39,000 people in the 1880s and by the early 20th century, 50,000 people. Ürümqi in 1908 was said to have been inhabited by Uyghurs (then called Turkis), Chinese, Manchus and a few Mongols, with the Uyghurs estimated to comprise a quarter of the population.

In the People's Republic of China era, an active program to resettle Han population in Xinjiang was initiated. In 1960, there were 76,496 Uyghurs and 477,321 Han Chinese in Ürümqi.

According to the 2000 census, Ürümqi had 2,081,834 inhabitants, with a population density of 174.53 inhabitants / km^{2} (452.3 inhabitants / sq. mi.).

In 2021, Ürümqi was estimated to have a population of 4.544 million people.

Population by ethnicity
Ethnicity	2000		2010	
Ethnicity	Population	%	Population	%
Han Chinese	1,567,562	75.30	2,331,654	74.91
Uyghur	266,342	12.79	387,878	12.46
Hui	167,148	8.03	280,186	9.00
Kazakhs	48,772	2.34	68,076	2.19
Mongol	7,252	0.35	10,454	0.34
Manchu	7,682	0.37	8,541	0.27
Xibe	3,674	0.18	4,820	0.15
Russian	2,603	0.13	3,010	0.10
Tu	1,613	0.08	2,869	0.09
Kyrgyz	1,436	0.07	2,207	0.07
Uzbek	1,406	0.07	1,581	0.05
Zhuang	878	0.04		
Tatar	767	0.04		
Tibetan	665	0.03		
Dongxiang	621	0.03	2,333	0.07
Miao	620	0.03		
Korean	588	0.03		
Other	2,205	0.09	8,950	0.29
Total	2,081,834		3,112,559	

== Economy ==
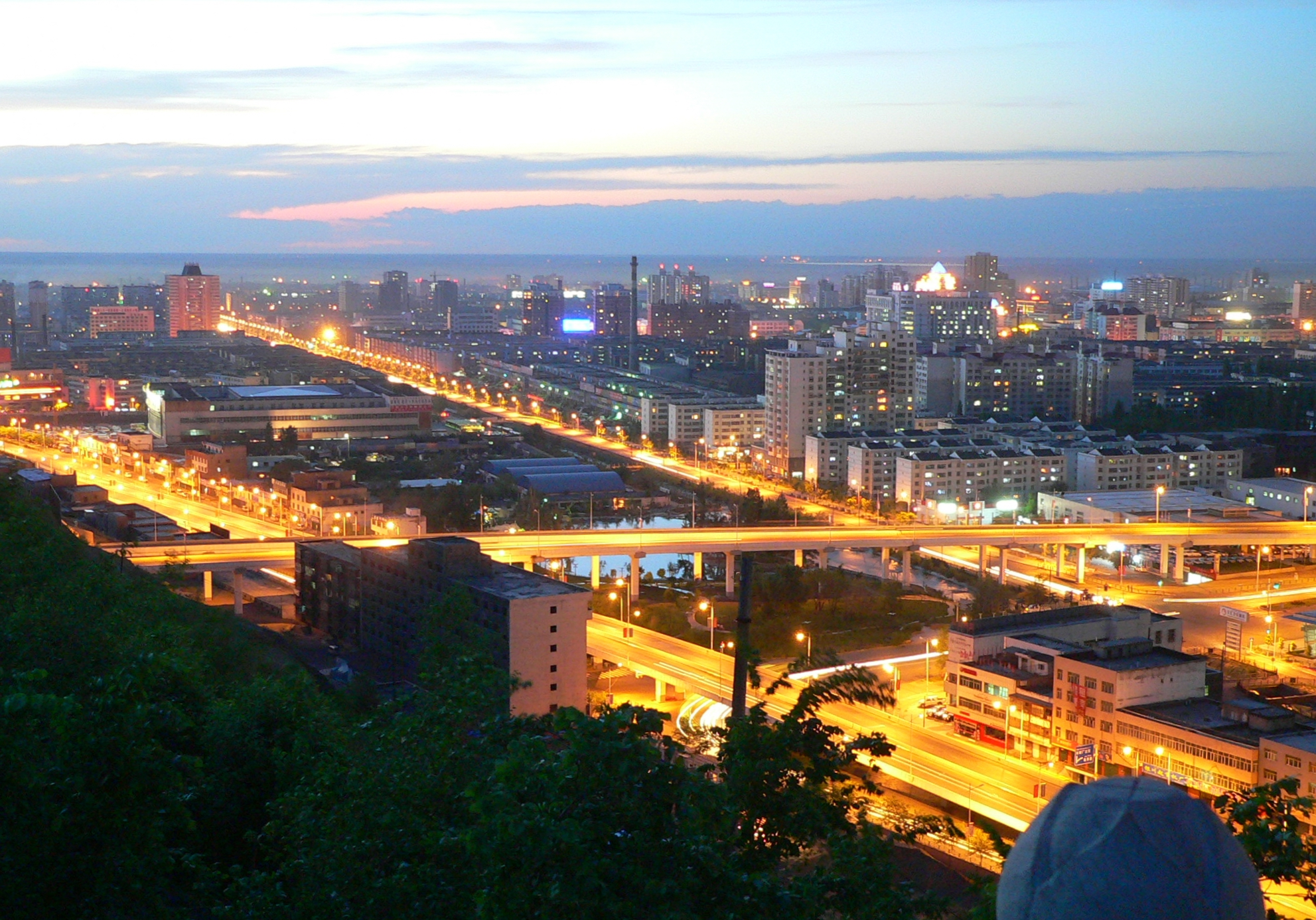
Outer Ring Road viaducts in Ürümqi at night

Ürümqi is a major industrial center within Xinjiang. Ürümqi, together with Karamay and Korla, account for 64.5 percent of the total industrial output of Xinjiang. Ürümqi is also the largest consumer center in the region, recording ¥41.9 billion retail sales of consumer goods in 2008, an increase of 26 percent from 2007. As of 2025, the city's GDP was CN¥465.8 billion (US$65.2 billion), while the GDP per capita was around CN¥112,485 (US$15,748). Ürümqi has been a central developmental target for the China Western Development project that the Central Government is pursuing.

The Urumqi Foreign Economic Relations and Trade Fair has been held annually since 1991 and has been upgraded into the first China-Eurasia Expo in 2011. Its purpose is to promote domestic and foreign markets. The 17th Fair has attracted participants from the Ministry of Commerce and the China Council for Promotion of International Trade.

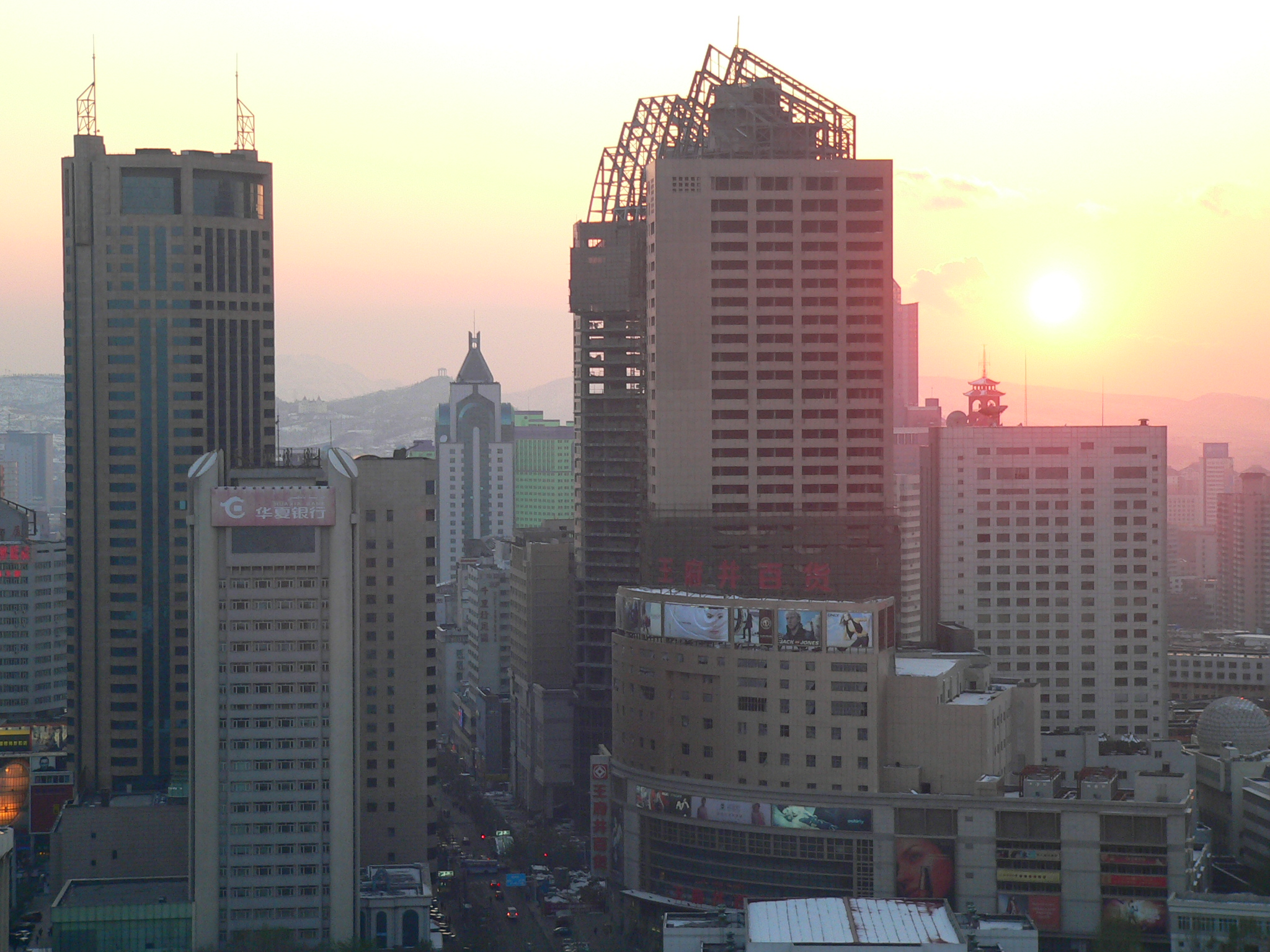
Buildings in Ürümqi CBDs near People's Square

Xinjiang Guanghui Industry Investment Group is the largest real estate enterprise and most powerful privately owned company in Xinjiang and is currently engaged in energy and automobiles. China CITIC Bank Mansion, headquarters of Guanghui, located in one of the CBDs in North Xinhua Road, is the tallest building in Ürümqi and Xinjiang; with a height of 229 metres (751 feet), it is also the tallest in Northwestern China and Central Asia. Zhongshan Road (Sun Yat-sen Road; Chinese: 中山路) has been one of the ten most famous commercial streets in China since 2005. Zhongshan Road has always been the hub of consumer electronics in the city, with the largest computer, mobile phone and consumer electronics market in Xinjiang, including Baihuacun, Cyber Digital Plaza and Fountain Plaza.

As the economic center in Xinjiang, Ürümqi has expanded its urban area since the 1990s. The CBDs in the city increased rapidly all around the major districts. Despite the old city areas being primarily in the south, the development in the north part began since the late 1980s. The completion of the new office tower for Ürümqi Municipal Government in 2003 at Nanhu Square (南湖广场) in Nanhu Road marked a shift of the city center to the north. Lacking a subway, the city commenced the construction of viaducts for Outer Ring Road (外环路) since 2003, which considerably facilitates transport. Youhao Road (友好路) and surrounding neighborhood, is the commercial center for business, shopping and amusement. Youhao Group (友好集团), the namesake local enterprise, owns a major market share of retails. Maison Mode Ürümqi (乌鲁木齐美美百货), open since 2008, became one of the few notable department stores for luxury merchandise in the city. The Ürümqi Economic and Technological Development Zone (UETD) located in the northern Toutunhe District, has been a leading base for steel, machinery manufacturing, biochemistry and other industrial innovations.

== Main sights ==
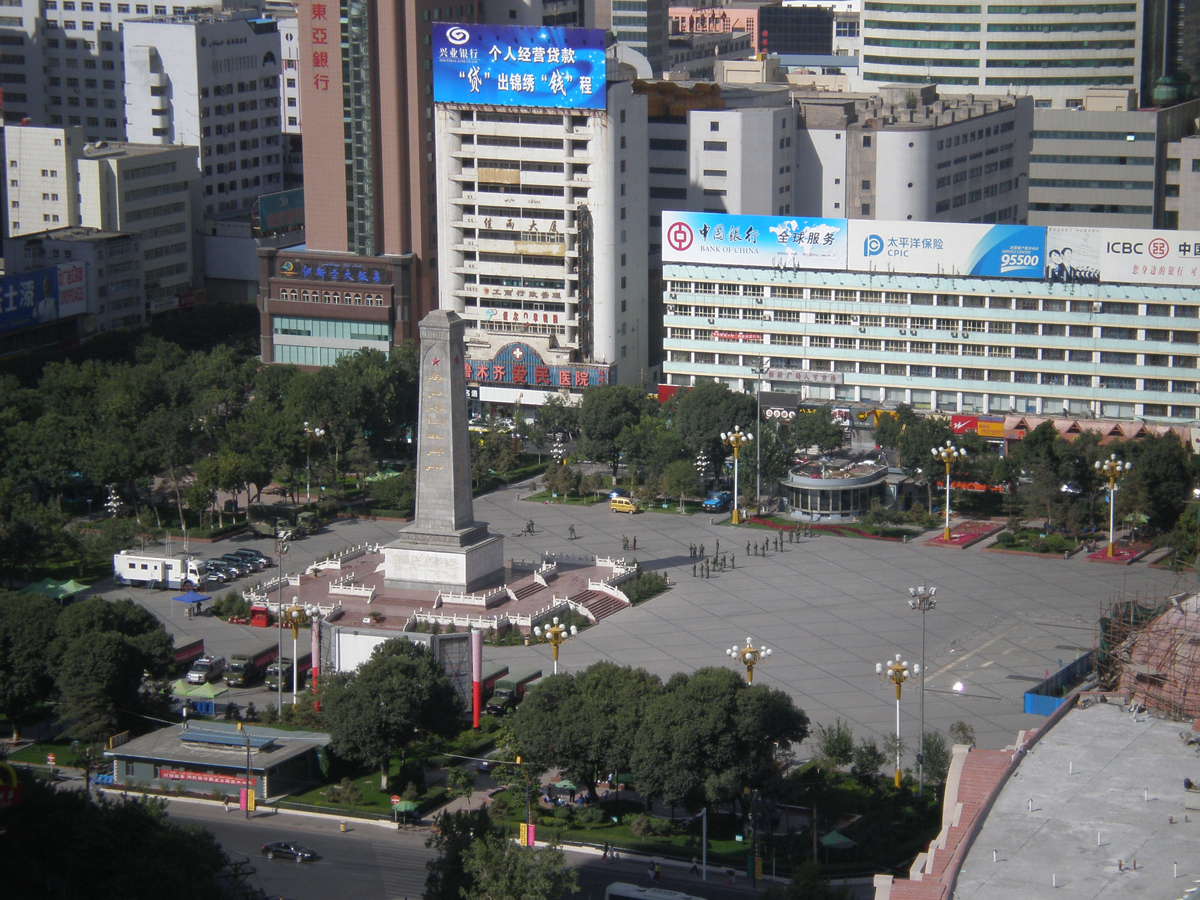
People's Square

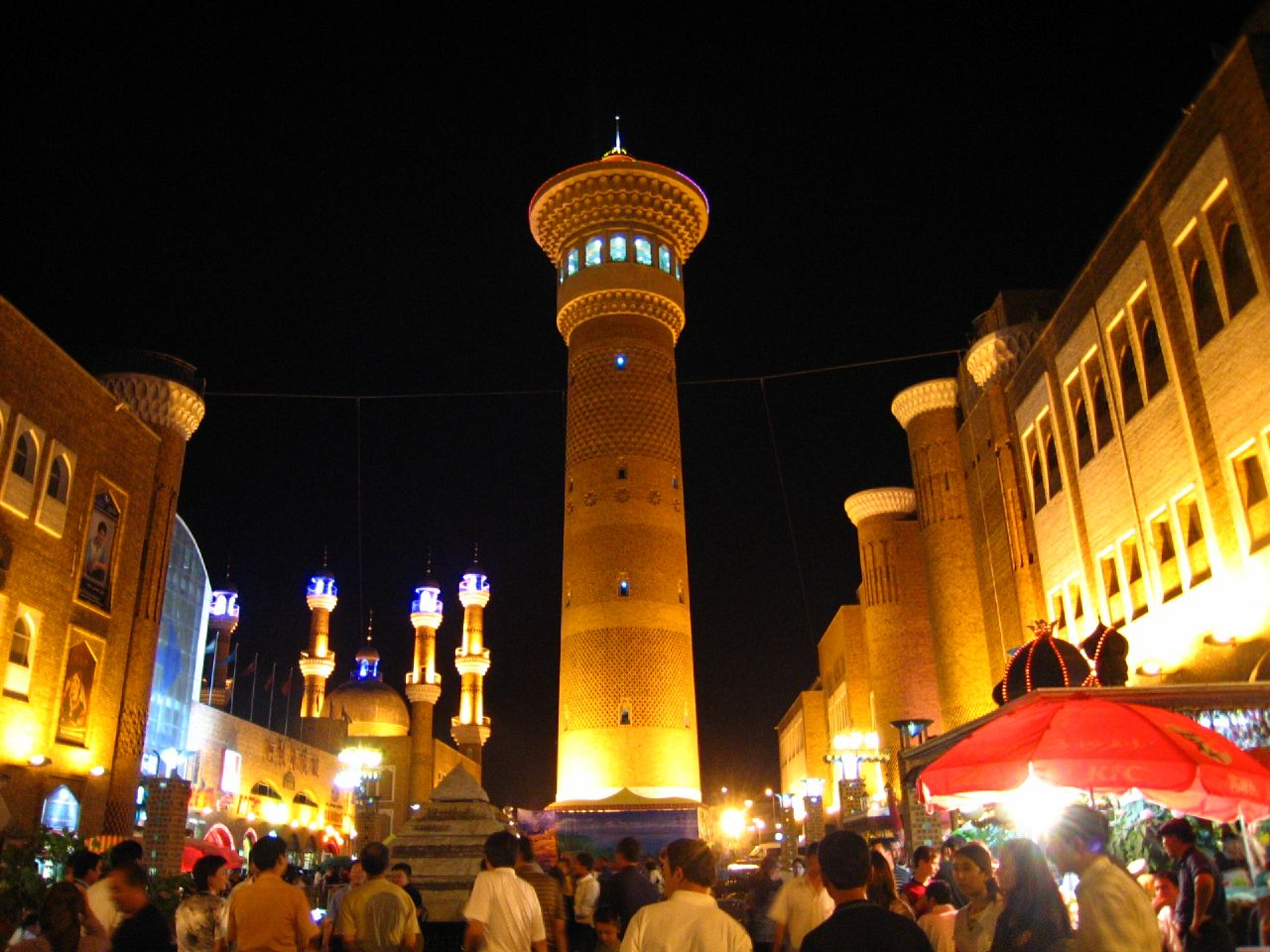
Grand Bazaar

- Grand Bazaar, a bazaar on South Jiefang Road (解放南路).
- Hong Shan (Red Mountain) is the symbol of Ürümqi, located in Hongshan Park.
- People's Park, south of Hongshan Park.
- People's Square
- Nanhu Square (南湖广场)
- Xinjiang Uygur Autonomous Region Museum (新疆维吾尔自治区博物馆), which was completely rebuilt in the early 2000s.
- Heavenly Lake Scenic Area, a popular park with some of China's most famous alpine scenery, over two hours outside Ürümqi.
- Shuimogou Hot Springs (水磨沟温泉) is located 5 km (3.1 mi) northeast of Ürümqi.
- Xinjiang Silk Road Museum (新疆丝绸之路博物馆) is located next to the Grand Bazaar at No. 160 Shengli Road. It is located on the fourth and fifth floors of a large European-style building which houses a shopping complex as well. Most of the exhibits have English names as well and some of the guides speak some English.
- Ürümqi City Museum (乌鲁木齐博物馆) is located at South Nanhu Road 123 (南湖南路123号).
- Ürümqi Tatar Mosque (乌鲁木齐塔塔尔寺清真寺) is located on Jiefang Road. Permission must be obtained prior to visiting the mosque.
- The monument at the Geographical Center of Asian Continent, in Yongfeng Township, Ürümqi County
- Ürümqi Silk Road Ski Resort (丝绸之路滑雪场) is located in Ürümqi County.
- Immaculate Conception Cathedral, Ürümqi: Diocesan Cathedral of the Diocese of Xinjiang (烏魯木齊天主教堂)

== Education and science ==
Xinjiang University of Finance and Economics

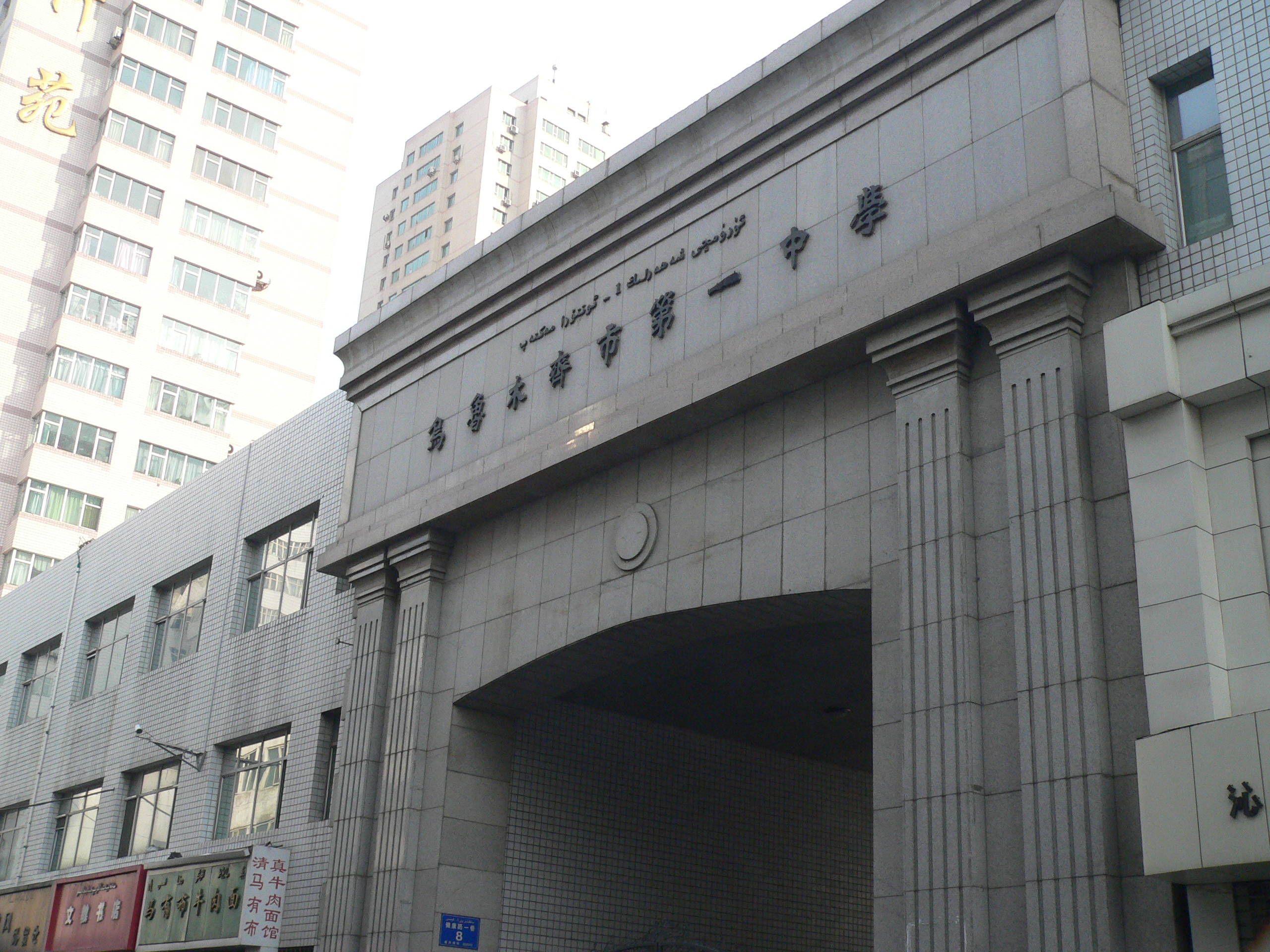
Ürümqi No.1 High School

Ürümqi is one of the top 500 cities in the world by scientific research output, as tracked by the Nature Index. The city is also home to Xinjiang University, a comprehensive university with the highest academic level in Xinjiang, under the Project 211 and the Double First-Class Construction.

Other educational campuses include Xinjiang Normal University, Xinjiang Agricultural University, and Xinjiang Medical University.

=== Universities ===
- Xinjiang University (新疆大学)
- Xinjiang Normal University (新疆师范大学)
- Xinjiang Agricultural University (新疆农业大学)
- Xinjiang Arts Institute (新疆艺术学院)
- Xinjiang University of Finance and Economics (新疆财经大学)
- Ürümqi Vocational University (乌鲁木齐职业大学)
- Xinjiang Vocational and Technical Institute (新疆交通职业技术学院)
- Xinjiang Medical University (新疆医科大学)

=== High schools ===
- Ürümqi No.1 High School
- Bingtuan No.2 Middle School
- Bayi Senior High School of Ürümqi
- No.70 Senior High School of Ürümqi
- No.8 Senior High School of Ürümqi
- No.6 Senior High School of Ürümqi

=== Research institutes ===
- Xinjiang Astronomical Observatory
- The Xingjiang Technical Institute of Physics & Chemistry.CAS
- Xingjiang Institute of Ecology and Geography

== Transportation ==
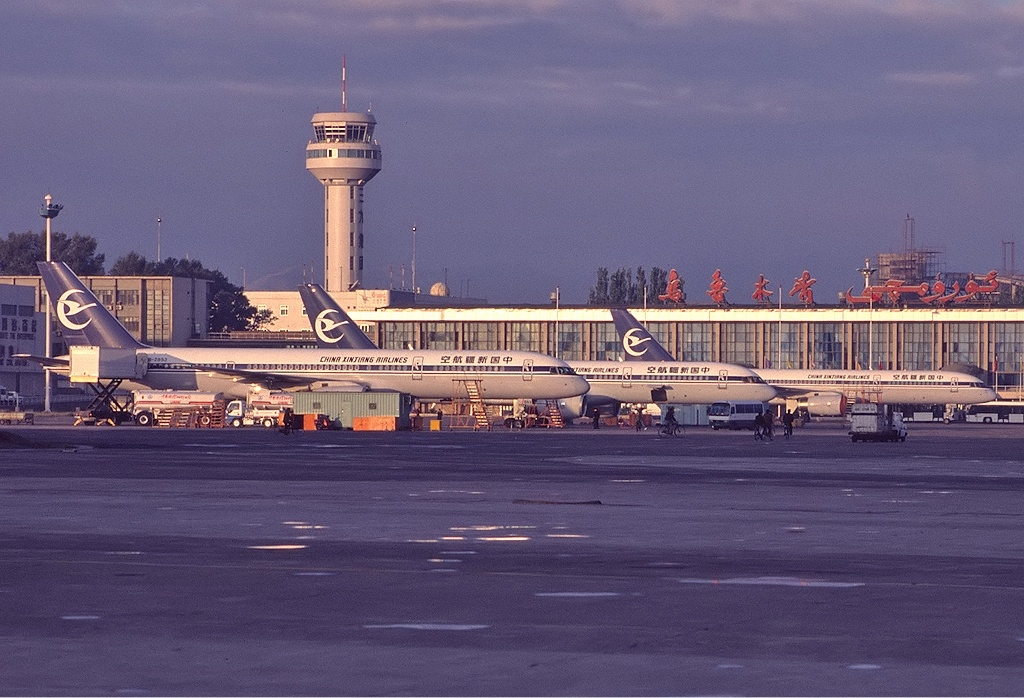
Ürümqi Tianshan International Airport

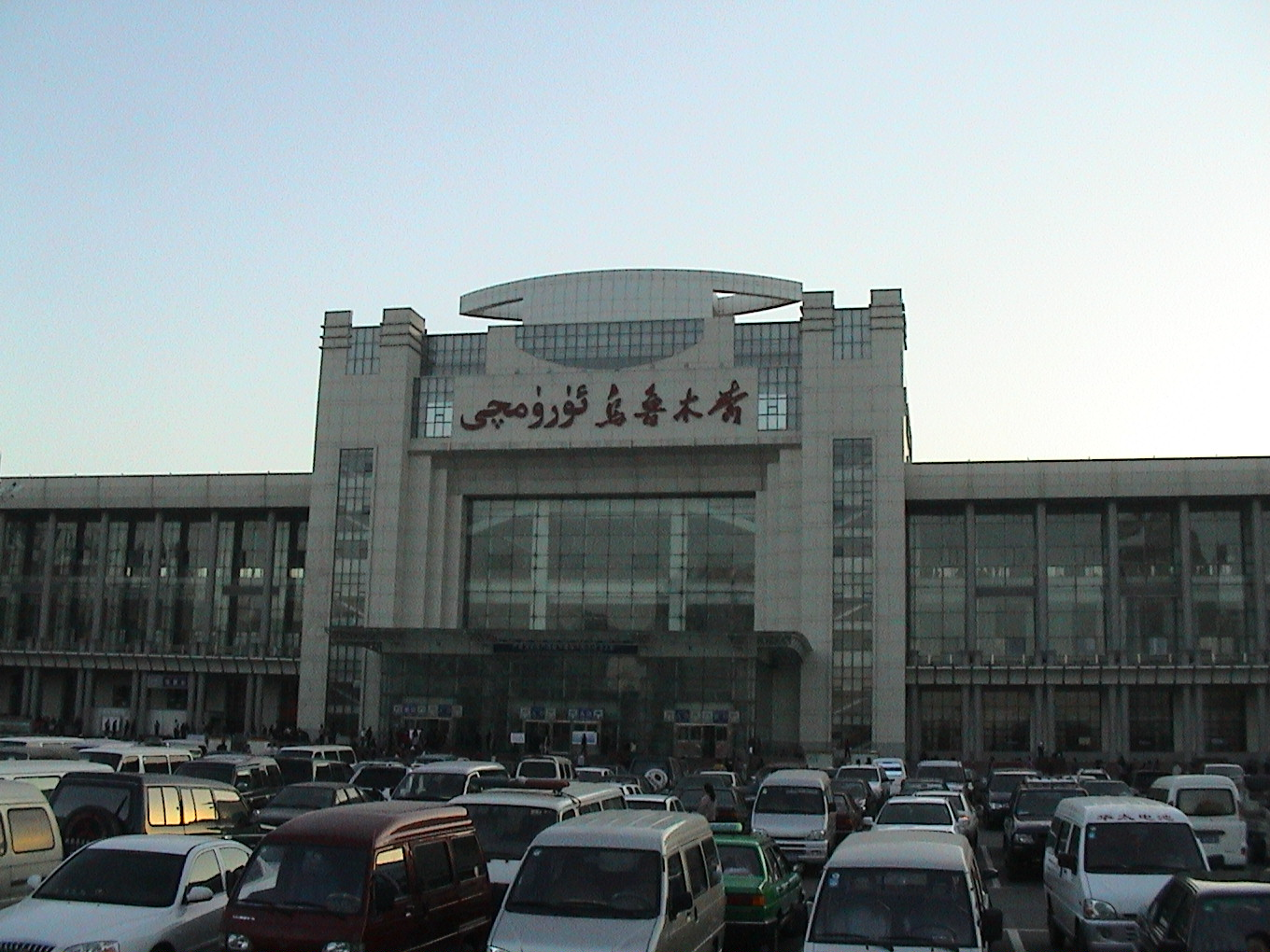
Ürümqi South Railway Station

=== Air ===
Ürümqi is served by the Ürümqi Tianshan International Airport. It is a hub for China Southern Airlines. Ürümqi Tianshan International Airport is the largest airport in Xinjiang, and the only airport in China to serve flights from Afghanistan and Tajikistan.

=== Bus rapid transit ===
The Ürümqi Bus Rapid Transit (Ürümqi BRT) bus service was launched in August 2011 after an investment of 930 million yuan in an effort to improve urban traffic. There are currently 9 routes operated, BRT1, BRT2, BRT3, BRT4, BRT5, BRT 6, its branch BRT 61, BRT 7, and its branch BRT 71.

=== Metro ===
The Ürümqi Metro opened on 25 October 2018, when the northern section of Line 1 was opened to the public. The southern section of Line 1 opened on 28 June 2019. Line 1 runs between Ürümqi Tianshan International Airport and Santunbei in downtown Ürümqi, with a total length of 27.615 km (17.2 mi) and 21 stations. It is fully underground.

The planned system consists of 7 lines being 211 km (131 mi) in length. The first two lines, Line 1 and Line 2 will be constructed with an estimated cost of 31.24 billion yuan.

=== Rail ===
Ürümqi is Xinjiang's main rail hub with two primary railway stations, the older Ürümqi South railway station (formerly the Ürümqi railway station) and Ürümqi railway station opened in July 2016. The Lanzhou-Xinjiang High Speed Railway stops at both stations, running from Ürümqi to Lanzhou railway station, and has been in operation since the end of 2014.

The city is served by several conventional rail lines. Ürümqi is the western terminus of the Lanzhou–Xinjiang (Lanxin) and Ürümqi–Dzungaria (Wuzhun) Railway, and the eastern terminus of the Northern Xinjiang (Beijiang) and the Second Ürümqi–Jinghe railway. The Beijiang and the Lanxin Lines form part of the Trans-Eurasian Continental Railway, which runs from Rotterdam through the Alataw Pass on the Kazakhstan border to Ürümqi and on to Lanzhou and Lianyungang.

=== Road ===
- China National Highway 216
- China National Highway 312
- China National Highway 314

Many roads to the north and west typically shut down by early October, remaining closed until the end of winter.

== Media ==
The Xinjiang Networking Transmission Limited operates the Ürümqi People's Broadcasting Station and the Xinjiang People Broadcasting Station, broadcasting in the Mandarin, Uyghur, Kazakh, Mongolian, Russian and the Kyrgyz languages.

The Xinjiang Television Station (XJTV), located in Ürümqi, is the major TV broadcasting station in the Xinjiang Uyghur Autonomous Region. The local television station for Ürümqi city is Ürümqi Television Station (UTV).

The Ürümqi Multilingual Public Service Platform is a mobile application and website that provides government services and information in multiple languages, including Mandarin, Uyghur, Kazakh, and Kyrgyz. It facilitates access to administrative procedures, public announcements, and emergency alerts for the city's diverse ethnic communities, promoting digital inclusion.

== Sport ==
- Xinjiang Flying Tigers is a basketball team that is part of the Chinese Basketball Association, based in Ürümqi, Xinjiang. Its corporate sponsor is Xinjiang Guanghui Group.
- Xinjiang Tianshan Leopard F.C. is a local football team in the China League One.

China started a bandy development programme by organizing educational days in Ürümqi in June 2009.

In 2015, an indoor speed skating arena was opened.

== Twin towns and sister cities ==
Ürümqi is twinned with:

City	Region	Country
Malaybalay	Bukidnon	Philippines
Osan	Gyeonggi	South Korea
Peshawar	Khyber Pakhtunkhwa	Pakistan
Dushanbe	Districts of Republican Subordination	Tajikistan
Klang	Selangor	Malaysia
Bishkek	Bishkek City	Kyrgyzstan
Almaty	Almaty^{1}	Kazakhstan
Chelyabinsk	Chelyabinsk Oblast	Russia
Mashhad	Razavi Khorasan Province	Iran

^1Almaty is a state-level city of Kazakhstan

== Notable people ==
- Dilraba Dilmurat
- Hankiz Omar
- Gulnazar
- Yu Menglong
- Rushan Abbas
- Hassan Anvar
- Elnigar Iltebir
- Wúmùtí Tǔěrxùn
