= Edward Wong =

American journalist (born 1972)

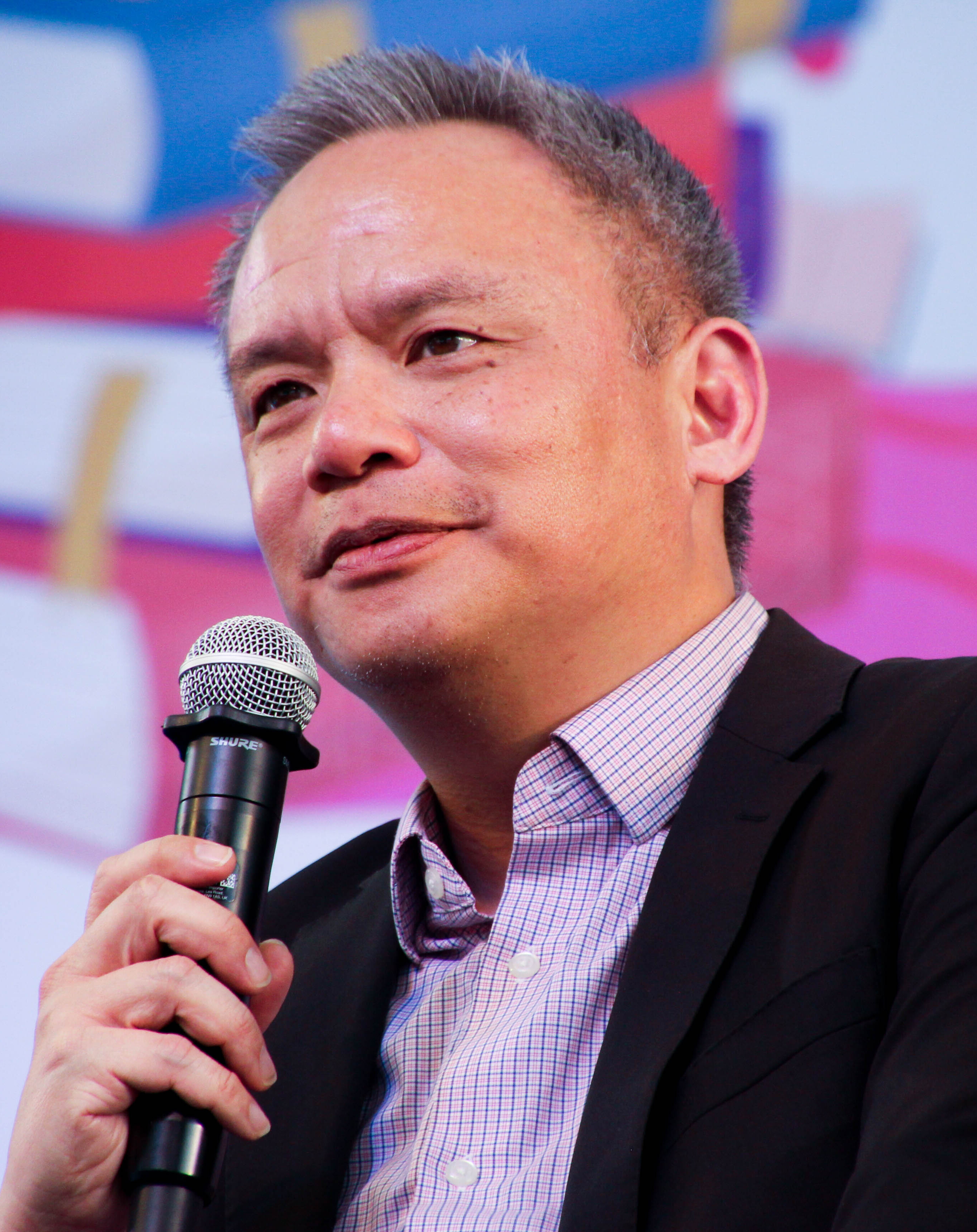
- Edward Wong in 2025 at the Jaipur Literature Festival
- Born: November 14, 1972 (age 53); Washington, D.C., U.S.
- Education: University of Virginia (BA); University of California, Berkeley
- Occupation: Journalist

Chinese name
- Chinese: 黃安偉
Transcriptions
Standard Mandarin
- Hanyu Pinyin: Huáng Ānwěi
Yue: Cantonese
- Jyutping: Wong^{4} On^{1} Wai^{5}

Signature
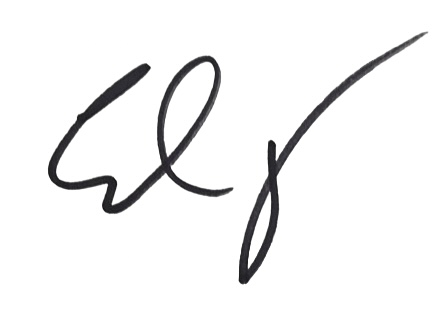

Edward Wong (born November 14, 1972) is an American journalist. He is a diplomatic correspondent for The New York Times.

== Early life and education ==
Wong was born on November 14, 1972, in Washington, D.C. He grew up in Alexandria, Virginia.

Wong holds a BA (summa cum laude) in English literature from the University of Virginia (1994), a joint MA in journalism and a MA in international and area studies from the University of California, Berkeley (1999).

Wong studied Mandarin Chinese at Beijing Language and Culture University, National Taiwan University, and Middlebury College.

== Career ==
In October 1999, Wong joined The New York Times (NYT). For four years he worked on the Metro, Sports, Business and Foreign desks. From November 2003 to 2007 he covered the Iraq War. From 2008 to 2016, he reported from China. He was the NYT's Beijing bureau chief. Wong has taught international reporting as a visiting professor at Princeton University and UC Berkeley. He has been a Nieman Fellow at Harvard University.

== Awards ==
In 2006, while a reporter for the NYT, Wong received a Livingston Award in the Excellence in International Reporting category for his coverage of the Iraq War. He was a member of the NYT team that was a finalist for the Pulitzer Prize for International Reporting.

In November 2024, Wong received Georgetown University Institute for the Study of Diplomacy's Edward Weintal Prize for Distinguished Reporting on Foreign Policy and Diplomacy.

== Publications ==
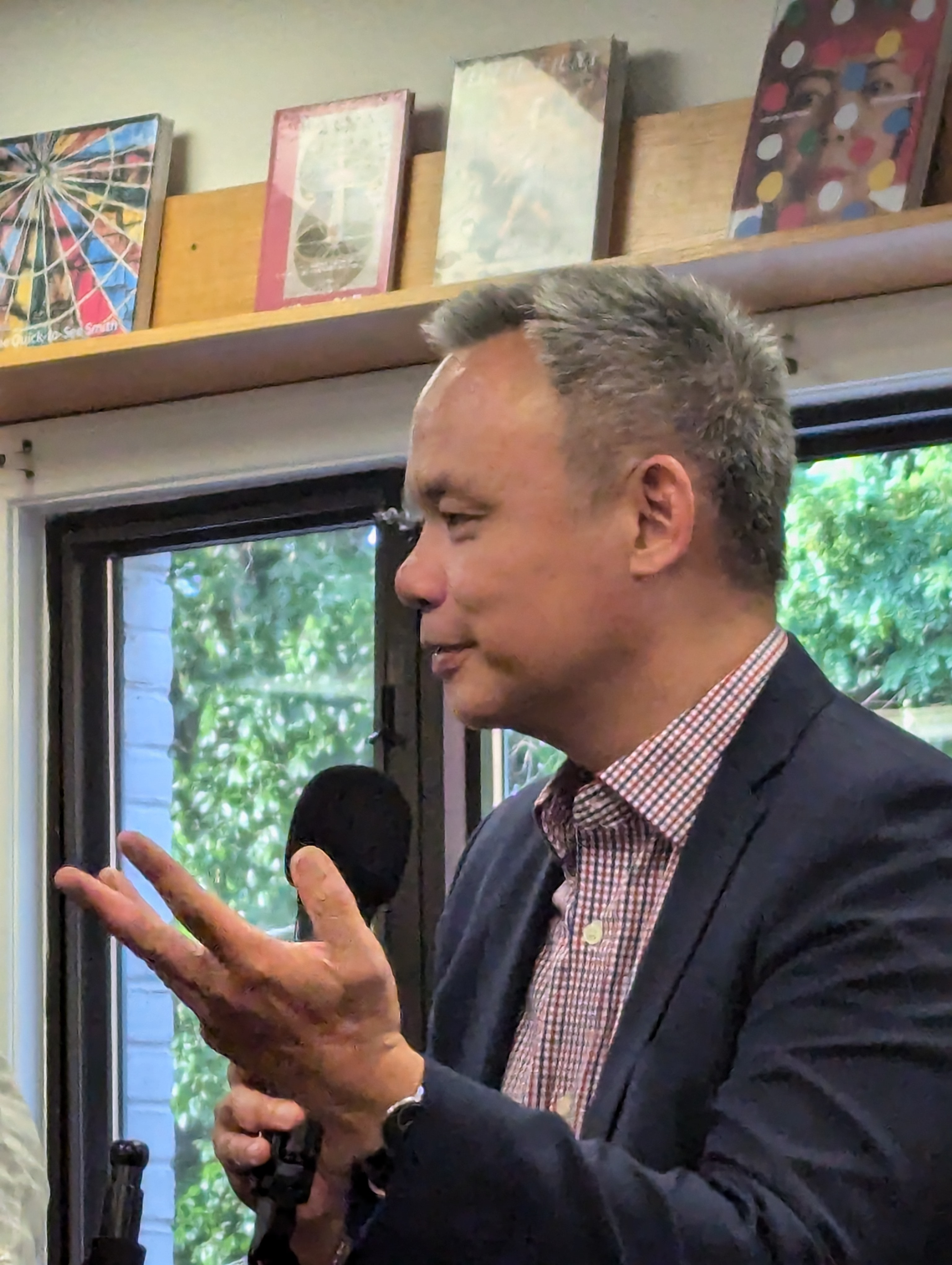
Wong at Politics and Prose bookstore in June 2024

=== Books ===
- At the Edge of Empire: A Family's Reckoning with China. Viking Press. May 2024.
