= Xinjiang People's Broadcasting Station =

Radio station serving Xinjiang, China

Chinese name
- Simplified Chinese: 新疆人民广播电台
- Hanyu Pinyin: Xīnjiāng rénmín guǎngbō diàntái

Mongolian name
- Mongolian Cyrillic: Шинжаангийн ардын радио нэвтрүүлгийн хороо
- Mongolian script: ᠰᠢᠨᠵᠢᠶᠠᠩ ᠤᠨ ᠠᠷᠠᠳ ᠤᠨ ᠷᠠᠳ᠋ᠢᠣ᠋ ᠨᠡᠪᠲᠡᠷᠡᠭᠦᠯᠭᠡ ᠶᠢᠨ ᠬᠣᠷᠢᠶ᠎ᠠ

Uyghur name
- Uyghur: شىنجاڭ خەلق رادىيو ئىستانسىسى
- Latin Yëziqi: Shinjang xelq radiyo istansisi

Kazakh name
- Kazakh: شينجياڭ حالىق راديو ستانسياسى

Kyrgyz name
- Kyrgyz: شئنجاڭ ەل رادىيو ىستانسىياسى

Xinjiang People's Broadcasting Station (XJBS) was a radio station broadcasting to the Xinjiang province area. It was operated by the Xinjiang Networking Transmission Limited in Mandarin, Uyghur, Kazakh, Kyrgyz and Mongolian languages. Founded as Dihua People's Broadcasting Station in 1949 it was renamed after Xinjiang in 1951. In 2018 it merged with Xinjiang Television (XJTV) forming the Xinjiang Radio and TV Station (Chinese: 新疆广播电视台; pinyin: Xīnjiāng guǎngbò diànshìtái).

== List of programmes ==
Xinjiang Radio Stations
Programme	Description
FM96.1新闻广播	News
FM94.9交通广播	Traffic
FM92.9文化旅游广播	Cultural arts and travel.
FM92.4老年广播	Geriatric Radio
FM89.5/AM738汉语综合广播	Chinese General Radio.
FM102.8故事广播	Story radio
FM103.9音乐广播 (Mix FM)	Music
FM101.7/AM558维吾尔语综合广播/ ئۇيغۇرچە ئۈنۋېرسال رادىيو	Uyghur general programme
FM107.4维吾尔语交通文艺 / قاتناش سەنئەت رادىيوسى	2nd Uyghur programme
FM98.2/AM1107哈萨克语广播 / قازاق راديوسى	Kazakh radio
AM1233蒙古语广播 / ᠮᠣᠩᠭᠣᠯ ᠬᠡᠯᠡᠨ ᠦ ᠷᠠᠳᠢᠣ᠋	Mongolian radio
柯尔克孜语广播 / قىرعىز رادىيوسۇ	Kyrgyz radio

=== Live streaming url* ===
- FM96.1新闻广播
- FM94.9交通广播
- FM92.9文化旅游广播
- FM92.4老年广播
- FM89.5/AM738汉语综合广播
- FM102.8故事广播
- FM107.4维吾尔语交通文艺
- FM98.2/AM1107哈萨克语广播
- AM1233蒙古语广播

*Updated: April 2025

== See also ==
- Tianshannet
