= Ürümqi Television Station =

Television station in Xinjiang Uyghur Autonomous Region, China

Ürümqi Television Station (UTV)
- Type: Broadcast
- Country: People's Republic of China
- Availability: in Urumqi, Urumqi county and Changji
- Official website: www.ucatv.com.cn

Urumqi Television Station (UTV) (Chinese: 乌鲁木齐电视台) is a state-owned television station in Ürümqi, Xinjiang, China. It was established in April 1985 as a cable network and started broadcasting on September 28 in the same year. Its logo is shaped in red after Hong Shan, the city's landmark mountain.

Events and Trifles (大事小事) is a featured high-quality program of UTV, known for its close-in coverage by quickly approaching events. However, there have been regulations that reporting on "sudden incidents" be censored by the network's authorities, in order to avoid airing rumors and falsehood.

After the 2009 Urumqi riots, UTV was a major media organ that provided aftermath-related reports within the city. During the later protests against syringe attacks, the Ürümqi government attempted to calm down the mass, particularly protesters, via UTV by frequently broadcasting pre-programmed speeches delivered by the then CPC secretary Li Zhi and other leaders.

== Channels ==
- UTV-1: Chinese news channel, first launched in 1985
- UTV-2: Uyghur news channel
- UTV-3: movie channel, 24-hour movie in urban region
- UTV-4: life channel
- UTV-5: sports and recreation channel
- UTV-6: women and children channel

== See also ==
- Xinjiang Television Station
- Ürümqi
