= Television in China =

Television is a prominent industry and form of mass media in China. Since 2018, state administration of the television industry has been overseen by the National Radio and Television Administration (NRTA). China Central Television (CCTV) is China's largest state-run national television broadcaster.

Television has existed in China since the Mao era, but has substantially increased in reach and popularity since the 1980s. By 1987, two-thirds of people in China had access to television. As of August 22, 2023, over 3,300 local, regional, and national TV channels are available in the country.

== History ==
China has had access to film and movie theaters since the early twentieth century, but plans for a broadcast television network did not develop until 1953. While Hong Kong established the first Chinese television station, Rediffusion Television, in 1957, the first mainland television transmission signal was made a year later on May 1st, 1958, in Beijing. Beijing Television (now China Central Television, since 1978) was formally launched on September 2, 1958. The first regional station, Shanghai Television, was launched a month later on October 1, 1958. Launching a television network was impossible given the size of the country; in the early years, the only microwave link was between Beijing and Tianjin, while outside of the capital area, it was launched on a per-region basis. In the early years, television studios in China were primitive. In 1965, an agreement was signed with Visnews to open up news images from China to its head offices in London.

Growth in telecommunications halted with the general economic collapse after the Great Leap Forward (1958–60). During the Cultural Revolution, military control was exerted over China's Broadcasting Bureau, and television growth was again stagnated. When broadcasts resumed, there was little other programming than the news (mostly rolling captions of Chairman Mao's thoughts) and performances of the five approved Peking operas by various theatrical troupes. Nevertheless, television infrastructure developed at a moderate pace during the 1960s and 1970s. In 1965, there were 12 television stations in mainland China, 1 national and 11 regional, and by 1971, there were 31. Most experienced television through communal viewing areas, and there were few to no personal television sets.

Television in China did not become a national institution until after the Mao Zedong era. Expansion and modernization of the broadcasting systems continued throughout the late 1970s and early 1980s. China's first television commercial aired on 18 January 1979.

=== 1980s ===
The new decade started with an increase in the amount of television sets in China, which, up until early 1979, was mostly reserved to affluent organizations and officials. Programming, up until then limited to Chinese films and educational content, began to diversify. Television became one of the Big Four consumer items in demand in 1980, at the top of the list, which was followed by tape recordings, washing machines, and electric fans. Beijing alone had 250,000 television sets in 1979, three times the number of sets available in 1978, and television antennas covered 35% of households in the city. There was also an increase in airtime, as stations up until then broadcast three to four hours a day. Among the novelties included feature films in English and, from 1 March that year, Man from Atlantis, becoming the first US TV series to air on Chinese television.

The Ministry of Radio and Television was established as a separate entity in 1982 to administer and upgrade the status of television and radio broadcasting. Subordinate to this ministry were the Central People's Broadcasting Station, Radio Beijing, and China Central Television. Additionally, the various broadcasting training, talent-search, research, publishing, and manufacturing organizations were brought under the control of the Ministry of Radio and Television. In 1986, responsibility for the movie industry was transferred from the Ministry of Culture to the new Ministry of Radio, Cinema, and Television.

Radio and television expanded rapidly in the 1980s as important means of mass communication and popular entertainment. In 1982, television was available by one measure only to 350 million of China's population of 1 billion, and was mostly watched on a communal basis. By 1985, television reached two-thirds of the population through more than 104 stations (up from 52 in 1984 and 44 in 1983); an estimated 85 percent of the urban population had access to television. During this time, the content of the programming changed drastically from the political lectures and statistical lists of the previous period. Typical television shows were entertainment, including feature films, sports, drama, music, dance, and children's programming. In 1985, a survey of a typical week of television programming made by the Shanghai publication Wuxiandian Yu Dianshi (Journal of Radio and Television) revealed that more than half of the programming could be termed entertainment; education made up 24 percent of the remainder of the programming, and news 15 percent. A wide cross-section of international news was presented each evening. Most news broadcasts had been borrowed from foreign news organizations, and a Chinese summary was dubbed over. China Central Television also contracted with several foreign broadcasters for entertainment programs. Between 1982 and 1985, six United States television companies signed agreements to provide American programs to China.

Since the late 1950s, people in the Pearl River Delta began to receive channels from Hong Kong with coaxial cable (1957–1973) and Yagi–Uda antenna (1967 onwards). Hong Kong channels were considered more entertaining and had Cantonese shows. Such reception was banned by the central government, but semi-accepted by local governments. By the late 1980s, local channels began to syndicate shows from Hong Kong.

China launched its first television-broadcast satellite in 1986.

In 1987, China Central Television (CCTV), the state network, managed China's television programs. In 1985, consumers purchased 15 million new sets, including approximately 4 million color sets. Production fell far short of demand. Because Chinese viewers often gathered in large groups to watch publicly owned sets, authorities estimated that two-thirds of the nation had access to television. In 1987, there were about 70 million television sets, an average of 29 sets per 100 families. CCTV had four channels that supplied programs to over ninety television stations throughout the country. Construction began on a major new CCTV studio in Beijing in 1985. CCTV produced its own programs, a large portion of which were educational, and the Television University in Beijing produced three educational programs weekly. The English-language lesson was the most popular program with an estimated 5 to 6 million viewers. Other programs included daily news, entertainment, teleplays, and special programs. Foreign programs included films and cartoons. Chinese viewers were particularly interested in watching international news, sports, and drama (see Culture of the People's Republic of China).

=== 1990s ===
By 1991, there were 140 million television sets for an audience of 700 million people. Stations such as CCTV and Guangdong TV, which had been relying on commercials for more than a decade, have reached their break-even point.

In September 1993, after acquiring the STAR TV satellite network, Rupert Murdoch publicly declared:

"(telecommunications) have proved an unambiguous threat to totalitarian regimes everywhere ... satellite broadcasting makes it possible for information-hungry residents of many closed societies to bypass state-controlled television channels"

After this, the former prime minister Li Peng requested and obtained a ban of satellite dishes throughout the country. Subsequently, the STAR TV network dropped the BBC channels from its satellite offer. This, and many ensuing declarations from Murdoch, led critics to believe the businessman was striving to appease the Chinese government in order to have the ban lifted. It is also alleged that the PRC government was unhappy with BBC coverage and threatened to block STAR TV in the huge mainland Chinese market if the BBC was not withdrawn. This is despite technology that is capable of blocking BBC World in China, while making it available in other countries it serves.

On New Year's Day 1994 at 06:00 Hangzhou Time, Zhejiang Television was China's first commercial satellite television based in the East China surrounding areas, the Yangtze Delta.

On October 6, 1997, at 09:00 Hefei Time, Anhui Television was China's second commercial satellite television. Later in the same year, on December 28 at 06:00 Nanjing Time, Jiangsu Television was China's third commercial satellite television based in the East China surrounding areas, like the Yangtze Delta.

In 1998, the State Administration of Radio, Film, and Television (SARFT) began the Connecting Every Village with Radio and TV Project, which extended radio and television broadcasting to every village in China. One of the first provinces to do so was Zhejiang, which enabled CCTV-1 and CCTV-2 to have total coverage in its mountainous areas.

On October 1, 1998, at 06:00 Shanghai Time, Dragon Television (Shanghai) (formerly known as Shanghai Television) was China's fourth commercial satellite television station based in East China surrounding areas, the Yangtze Delta (free-to-air terrestrial television in Shanghai only).

=== 2000s ===
In 2000, the Chinese government put forward a goal of promoting media amalgamation by establishing trans-regional multi-media news groups. It also instituted detailed regulations on media industry fund-raising, foreign-funded cooperation, and trans-media development.

The State Administration of Radio, Film, and Television (SARFT), founded at the end of 2001, integrated the resources of the central-level radio, television, and film industry, plus those of the radio and television, Internet companies, into China's biggest and strongest multi-media group covering the fields of television, Internet, publishing, advertising, etc. At the same time, the Chinese media industry is cooperating with overseas media groups.

On 23 June 2002, most of CCTV's channels, as well as ten provincial channels, were inaccessible on satellite to air pro-Falun Gong messages. Two days later, on 25 June 2002, the television transmitter in Yantai, Shandong had the signals of CCTV-1, CCTV-3, and CCTV-5 hijacked to air a message saying "Falun Gong is good". In Laiyang County, the signal fell for fifteen minutes. It was reported by the Hong Kong press that Falun Gong members intercepted the satellite using sophisticated equipment. The sect is outlawed in the PRC.

By 2003, 30 overseas television networks, including Phoenix Television, Bloomberg Television, STAR TV, Eurosport, BBC World, CNBC, and China Entertainment Television, had entered China with limitations. At the same time, the English-language channel of CCTV entered the United States through Fox News Internet under the jurisdiction of News Corporation.

In conformity with trends in the international television industry, CCTV has made progress in the direction of specialization, introducing three specialized channels between 2003 and 2004: CCTV-News, CCTV-Children, and CCTV-Music.

Since September 1, 2006, the Chinese government has banned foreign-produced animation between the hours of 5:00 and 8:00 P.M. on state-run television to protect struggling Chinese animation studios that have been affected by the popularity of such cartoons.

Despite these advances, a considerable gap remains between the eastern coastal region and the Chinese hinterland, where television sets and regional broadcasters are far less common.

=== Today ===
Altogether, there are 3,000 television stations across the country. Large international TV expositions, including the Shanghai Television Festival, Beijing International Television Week, China Radio and Television Exposition, and Sichuan Television Festival, are held on a regular basis.

Besides judging and conferring awards, these festivals conduct academic exchanges and the import and export of TV programs. Shanghai has become the largest television program trading market in Asia.

Since China entered the World Trade Organization, the trend within China's media industry is to form inter-media and trans-regional media groups operated with multiple patterns so as to meet competition and challenges from powerful overseas media groups.

In October 2014, actors and actresses who have used drugs, visited prostitutes, or broken the law were not allowed to appear on television, movies, or other forms of broadcast (radio and advertisement) in China. The ban also encompassed online media, film, and publishing. China Daily reported that the ban is meant to "keep the industry healthy" and "Celebrities who break the law should not be invited to appear in programs, and transmission of their words should be suspended." It was also noted that "Recent cases involving stars using drugs or visiting prostitutes have harmed the image of the entertainment industry and set a bad example for young people." In 2014, China detained several Chinese celebrities on drug-related charges. The Ministry of Public Security stated in February 2014 that police need to "get tough on drugs, gambling, and prostitution."

All nationwide analog shutdowns started on July 31, 2020, at midnight, and the last analog broadcasting station officially turned off on April 1, 2021, at midnight.

== Censorship ==
Television censorship is conducted by the State Administration of Radio, Film, and Television of the People's Republic of China (PRC) and targets the overseas programs (including those from Hong Kong and Macau), that can be watched in mainland China. In addition, receiving satellite TV signals without permission is against the law in mainland China.

CNN has reported that their broadcast agreement in China includes an arrangement that their signal must pass through a Chinese-controlled satellite. In this way, Chinese authorities have been able to black out CNN segments at will. CNN has also said that their broadcasts are not widely available in China, but rather only in certain diplomatic compounds, hotels, and apartment blocks.

Blacked out content has included references to the 1989 Tiananmen Square protests and massacre, the Dalai Lama, the death of Zhao Ziyang, the 2008 Tibetan unrest, the Chinese milk scandal of 2008, negative developments about the Beijing Olympics, and historical dramas, such as Story of Yanxi Palace during national events.

During the Summer Olympics in Beijing, all Chinese TV stations were ordered to delay live broadcasts by ten seconds, a policy that was designed to give censors time to react in case free-Tibet demonstrators or others staged political protests. During a television report of the inauguration of Barack Obama in 2009, the state-run China Central Television (CCTV) abruptly cut away from its coverage of Obama's address when he spoke of how "earlier generations faced down fascism and communism".

In 2021, China banned BBC World News, although access had already been heavily restricted before then, and what was carried was censored, with parts of the show being blacked out by censors live. They were banned due to their coverage of the persecution of Uyghurs in China and in retaliation for CGTN's ban from the British market for violating broadcast regulations there.

During the 2022 COVID-19 protests in China, CCTV's coverage of the 2022 FIFA World Cup censored scenes of maskless fans in the stadium. CCTV avoided coverage of the protests directly.

== Digital terrestrial television ==
According to the Chinese government's plans, by 2010, the existing cable television in cities above the county level in the eastern and middle parts of China, as well as in most cities above the county level in the western parts of the country, will be digitized. The analog signals within the country will be switched off in stages between 2015 and 2018, due to the large size of the territory. In the meantime, the policies emphasize the continued amalgamation of the three networks of Internet, television, and telecom.

To realize the above goals, NDRC, MII, and SARFT will be responsible for organizing special projects for implementing digital television services. Support will be given to digital TV-related enterprises' listings, and more investment will be injected into them.

According to China's national strategy, the country aims to shift from a major television manufacturer to a digital television power during the development of the digital television industry. The policies show that by 2010, the annual sales of China's digital television sets and related products will reach RMB250 billion, and the export volume will reach US$10 billion. By 2015, China's digital television industry scale and technology level will rank among the top in the world, and it will become one of the world's largest digital television set and key components development and production bases. First analog broadcasting television station officially turn off on 30 August 2020 at 23:59:59 CST (UTC+8) for all Hunan Province on Hunan Television only and all analog broadcastings officially full-time completely turn off on New Year's Eve (31 December) 2020 at 03:59:59 CST (UTC+8) for all nationwide (including Shanghai and Suzhou) so all analog broadcastings officially full-time completely turn off on 31 March 2021 at 23:59:59 CST (UTC+8) for all Shaanxi Province. On New Year's Eve (31 December) 2020 at 04:00:00 CST (UTC+8), the digital terrestrial television of the People's Republic of China fully turned, shifted, and switched to all full high definition for all nationwide (including Shanghai and Suzhou). On 1 April 2021, the digital terrestrial television of the People's Republic of China fully turned, shifted, and switched to all full high definition for all of Shaanxi Province.

Shutdown schedule of terrestrial analog TV in some provinces
Province, municipality, and autonomous region	Terrestrial analog TV shutdown time (stopped at 00:00:00 CST of the day)		
Province, municipality, and autonomous region	Central Channel	Provincial Channel	County Channel
Nationwide	31 December 2020 at 03:59:59 CST		
Tianjin	31 December 2020 at 03:59:59 CST		
Shanghai	31 December 2020 at 03:59:59 CST		
Suzhou	31 December 2020 at 03:59:59 CST		
Hunan	30 August 2020 at 23:59:59 CST (Hunan Television); 31 December 2020 at 03:59:59 CST (Official)		
Shanxi	30 November 2020 at 23:59:59 CST		
Inner Mongolia	30 November 2020 at 23:59:59 CST		
Jilin	22 December 2020 at 23:59:59 CST		
Jiangsu	30 November 2020 at 23:59:59 CST		
Anhui	31 December 2020 at 03:59:59 CST		
Shandong	31 December 2020 at 03:59:59 CST		
Hainan	31 December 2020 at 03:59:59 CST		
Chongqing	31 December 2020 at 03:59:59 CST		
Yunnan	30 November 2020 at 23:59:59 CST		
Shaanxi	31 March 2021 at 23:59:59 CST		
Qinghai	31 December 2020 at 03:59:59 CST		

== Cable television ==
Cable television is the usual transmission method in all urban areas of mainland China - television aerials are an extremely rare sight. Cable systems usually carry all the CCTV channels in Mandarin, plus all the channels of all Chinese municipalities, provinces, and/or regions (such stations are listed below). The remaining slots carry the main channels from several other province-level stations, and may carry additional channels from metropolitan stations such as BTV and Shanghai Media Group. They may also carry a local channel for a particular sub-provincial municipality, prefecture, or county. Individual compounds (hotels, housing estates, etc.) often add a request channel showing karaoke music videos and animations. An extremely small number of compounds with many foreign residents (e.g. five-star hotels in Beijing) will also carry selected channels from Hong Kong, Taiwan, and the West. Phoenix Television has the widest carriage under this rule.

Mainland China had more than 44.5 million digital cable television users in 2008, had 0.9 billion digital cable television users, and 0.2 billion IPTV Users in 2015.

Unlike many cable television operators in other countries that support two-way modes, China's cable television runs in a one-way mode (download only, no upload and no interactive services).

== List of national networks and channels ==
=== China Central Television ===
Name	Simplified Chinese	Launch	Format
CCTV-1 (General Channel)	中国中央电视台综合频道	1958	SDTV (576i, 16:9), HDTV (1080i/1440p, 16:9)
CCTV-2 (Finance Channel)	中国中央电视台财经频道	1973	SDTV (576i, 16:9), HDTV (1080i, 16:9)
CCTV-3 (Arts and Entertainment Channel)	中国中央电视台综艺频道	1986	SDTV (576i, 16:9), HDTV (1080i, 16:9)
CCTV-4 (International Chinese Channel Asia)	中国中央电视台中文国际频道（亚洲版）	1992	SDTV (576i, 16:9), HDTV (1080i, 16:9)
CCTV-4 (International Chinese Channel Europe)	中国中央电视台中文国际频道（欧洲版）	2007	SDTV (576i, 16:9), HDTV (1080i, 16:9, in France)
CCTV-4 (International Chinese Channel America)	中国中央电视台中文国际频道（美洲版）	2007	SDTV (576i, 16:9), HDTV (1080i, 16:9)
CCTV-5 (Sports Channel)	中国中央电视台体育频道	1994	SDTV (576i, 16:9), HDTV (1080i, 16:9)
CCTV-5+ (Sports Events Channel)	中国中央电视台体育赛事频道	2013	HDTV (1080i, 16:9)
CCTV-6 (National Movie Channel)	中国中央电视台电影频道	1994	SDTV (576i, 16:9), HDTV (1080i, 16:9)
CCTV-7 (National Defense and Military Channel)	中国中央电视台国防军事频道	2019	SDTV (576i, 16:9), HDTV (1080i, 16:9)
CCTV-8 (Television Series Channel)	中国中央电视台电视剧频道	1994	SDTV (576i, 16:9), HDTV (1080i, 16:9)
CCTV-9 (Chinese Documentary Channel)	中国中央电视台纪录频道	2011	SDTV (576i, 16:9), HDTV (1080i, 16:9)
CCTV-10 (Science & Education Channel)	中国中央电视台科教频道	2001	SDTV (576i, 16:9), HDTV (1080i, 16:9)
CCTV-11 (Chinese Opera Channel)	中国中央电视台戏曲频道	2001	SDTV (576i, 16:9), HDTV (1080i, 16:9)
CCTV-12 (Society & Law Channel)	中国中央电视台社会与法频道	2004	SDTV (576i, 16:9), HDTV (1080i, 16:9)
CCTV-13 (Chinese News Channel)	中国中央电视台新闻频道	2003	SDTV (576i, 16:9), HDTV (1080i, 16:9)
CCTV-14 (Children's Channel)	中国中央电视台少儿频道	2003	SDTV (576i, 16:9), HDTV (1080i, 16:9)
CCTV-15 (Music Channel)	中国中央电视台音乐频道	2004	SDTV (576i, 16:9), HDTV (1080i, 16:9)
CCTV-16 (Olympic Channel)	中国中央电视台奥林匹克频道	2021	HDTV (1080i, 16:9)
CCTV-17 (Agricultural and Rural Channel)	中国中央电视台农业农村频道	2019	SDTV (576i, 16:9), HDTV (1080i, 16:9)
CGTN (International English Channel)	中国国际电视台英语新闻频道	2000	SDTV (576i, 16:9), HDTV (1080i, 16:9)
CGTN-Français (International French Channel)	中国国际电视台法语频道	2007	SDTV (576i, 16:9)
CGTN-Español (International Spanish Channel)	中国国际电视台西班牙语频道	2007	SDTV (576i, 16:9)
CGTN-العربية (International Arabic Channel)	中国国际电视台阿拉伯语频道	2009	SDTV (576i, 16:9)
CGTN-русский (International Russian Channel)	中国国际电视台俄语频道	2009	SDTV (576i, 16:9)
CGTN Documentary (English Documentary Channel)	中国国际电视台英语纪录频道	2011	SDTV (576i, 16:9), HDTV (1080i, 16:9)
CCTV-4K (4KUHD Channel)	中央广播电视总台4K超高清频道	2018	UHDTV (2160p, 16:9)
CCTV-8K (8KUHD Channel)	中央广播电视总台8K超高清频道	2021	UHDTV (4320p, 16:9)

=== National free-to-air public satellite television ===
Name	Simplified Chinese	Launch date	Broadcasting area	Transmitted area	Head office	Broadcasting hours	Format	Owner
Anhui Television	安徽卫视	October 6, 1997; 29 years ago	National	Anhui	Hefei	24-hour	HDTV (1080i, 16:9)	Anhui Broadcasting Corporation (ABC)
Beijing Kaku	北京卡酷少儿卫视	September 10, 2007; 19 years ago	National	Beijing	Chaoyang District, Beijing	24-hour	HDTV (1080i, 16:9)	Beijing Radio and Television Station (BRTV)
Beijing Television	北京卫视	January 1, 1998; 28 years ago	National	Beijing	Chaoyang District, Beijing	24-hour	HDTV (1080i, 16:9)	Beijing Radio and Television Station (BRTV)
Jiangsu Television	江苏卫视	December 28, 1997; 28 years ago	National	Jiangsu	Nanjing	24-hour	SDTV (576i, 16:9), HDTV (1080i, 16:9)	Jiangsu Broadcasting Corporation (JSBC)
Jiangsu Youman	江苏优漫卡通卫视	October 1, 2010; 16 years ago	National	Jiangsu	Nanjing	24-hour	SDTV (576i, 16:9), HDTV (1080i, 16:9)	Jiangsu Broadcasting Corporation (JSBC)
Dragon Television (Shanghai)	上海东方卫视	October 1, 1998; 28 years ago	National	Shanghai	Pudong	24-hour	SDTV (576i, 16:9), HDTV (1080i, 16:9)	Radio and Television Station of Shanghai (RTS), Shanghai Media Group (SMG)
Shanghai Toonmax	上海哈哈炫动卫视	December 26, 2004; 21 years ago	National	Shanghai	Pudong	24-hour	SDTV (576i, 16:9), HDTV (1080i, 16:9)	Radio and Television Station of Shanghai (RTS), Shanghai Media Group (SMG)
Zhejiang Television	浙江卫视	January 1, 1994; 32 years ago	National	Zhejiang	Hangzhou	24-hour	SDTV (576i, 16:9), HDTV (1080i, 16:9)	Zhejiang Radio and Television Group (ZRTG)
Guangdong Television	广东卫视	August 7, 1996; 30 years ago	National	Guangdong	Guangzhou	24-hour	SDTV (576i, 16:9), HDTV (1080i, 16:9)	Guangdong Radio and Television (GRT)
Southern Television Guangdong	广东南方卫视	July 28, 2004; 22 years ago	National	Guangdong	Guangzhou	24-hour	SDTV (576i, 16:9), HDTV (1080i, 16:9)	Guangdong Radio and Television (GRT)
Guangdong Jiajia	广东嘉佳卡通卫视	November 27, 2009; 16 years ago	National	Guangdong	Guangzhou	24-hour	SDTV (576i, 16:9), HDTV (1080i, 16:9)	Guangdong Radio and Television (GRT)
Shenzhen Television	深圳卫视	June 28, 2004; 22 years ago	National	Shenzhen	Futian District	24-hour	SDTV (576i, 16:9), HDTV (1080i, 16:9)	Shenzhen Media Group (SZMG)

=== Other satellite television ===
Name	Simplified Chinese	Origin	Launch	Format	Owner
Agriculture Television	农林卫视	Shaanxi	2008	SDTV (576i, 4:3)	Shaanxi Broadcasting Corporation (SXBC)
Bedahuang Television	北大荒农业频道	Heilongjiang	1997	SDTV (576i, 4:3)	Bedahuang Broadcasting Television
Bingtuan Television	兵团卫视	Xinjiang	2009	SDTV (576i, 16:9)	Xinjiang Bingtuan Radio and Television
Chongqing Television	重庆卫视	Chongqing	1997	SDTV (576i, 4:3), HDTV (1080i, 16:9)	Chongqing Broadcasting Group (CBG)
Cross-Strait Television	海峡卫视	Fujian	2005	SDTV (576i, 16:9), HDTV (1080i, 16:9)	Fujian Media Group (FMG)
Gansu Television	甘肃卫视	Gansu	1998	SDTV (576i, 4:3)	Gansu Media Group (GSMG)
Guangxi Television	广西卫视	Guangxi	1997	SDTV (576i, 4:3), HDTV (1080i, 16:9)	Guangxi Television
Guizhou Television	贵州卫视	Guizhou	1996	SDTV (576i, 4:3), HDTV (1080i, 16:9)	Guizhou Radio Television
Hebei Television	河北卫视	Hebei	1998	SDTV (576i, 4:3), HDTV (1080i, 16:9)	Hebei Television (HEBTV)
Heilongjiang Television	黑龙江卫视	Heilongjiang	1997	SDTV (576i, 4:3), HDTV (1080i, 16:9)	Heilongjiang Broadcasting Television
Henan Television	河南卫视	Henan	1996	SDTV (576i, 16:9), HDTV (1080i, 16:9)	Henan Television (HNTV)
Hubei Television	湖北卫视	Hubei	1997	SDTV (576i, 4:3), HDTV (1080i, 16:9)	Hubei Network Radio and Television
Hunan Television	湖南卫视	Hunan	1997	SDTV (576i, 4:3), HDTV (1080i, 16:9)	Hunan Broadcasting System (HBS)
Inner Mongolia Television	内蒙古卫视	Inner Mongolia	1997	SDTV (576i, 4:3)	Inner Mongolia Television (NMTV)
Jiangxi Television	江西卫视	Jiangxi	1997	SDTV (576i, 4:3), HDTV (1080i, 16:9)	Jiangxi Radio and Television
Jilin Television	吉林卫视	Jilin	1997	SDTV (576i, 4:3), HDTV (1080i, 16:9)	Jilin Television (JLTV)
Liaoning Television	辽宁卫视	Liaoning	1997	SDTV (576i, 16:9), HDTV (1080i, 16:9)	Liaoning Radio and Television (LRTV)
Ningxia Television	宁夏卫视	Ningxia	1998	SDTV (576i, 4:3)	Ningxia Radio and Television
Qinghai Television	青海卫视	Qinghai	1997	SDTV (576i, 16:9), HDTV (1080i, 16:9)	Qinghai Radio and Television
Sansha Television	三沙卫视	Hainan	2013	SDTV (576i, 16:9)	Sansha Broadcasting Group
Shandong Television	山东卫视	Shandong	1994	SDTV (576i, 16:9), HDTV (1080i, 16:9)	Shandong Radio and Television
Shaanxi Television	陕西卫视	Shaanxi	1997	SDTV (576i, 4:3/16:9), HDTV (1080i, 16:9)	Shaanxi Broadcasting Corporation (SXBC)
Shanxi Television	山西卫视	Shanxi	2004	SDTV (576i, 4:3), HDTV (1080i, 16:9)	Shanxi Radio Television
Sichuan Television	四川卫视	Sichuan	2003	SDTV (576i, 4:3), HDTV (1080i, 16:9)	Sichuan Radio and Television
Southeast Television	东南卫视	Fujian	1994	SDTV (576i, 16:9), HDTV (1080i, 16:9)	Fujian Media Group (FMG)
Hainan Television	海南卫视	Hainan	1999	SDTV (576i, 16:9)	Hainan Broadcasting Group
Tianjin Television	天津卫视	Tianjin	1998	SDTV (576i, 16:9), HDTV (1080i, 16:9)	Tianjin Radio and Television
Xiamen Television	厦门卫视	Fujian	2005	SDTV (576i, 16:9), HDTV (1080i, 16:9)	Xiamen Media Group (XMG)
Xinjiang Television	新疆卫视	Xinjiang	1997	SDTV (576i, 4:3)	Xinjiang Television Station
Xizang Television	西藏卫视	Tibet	2002	SDTV (576i, 4:3)	Xizang Television (XZTV)
Yunnan Television	云南卫视	Yunnan	2000	SDTV (576i, 16:9), HDTV (1080i, 16:9)	Yunnan Radio and Television

=== Non-Standard Chinese satellite television ===
Name	Simplified Chinese	Language	Launch	Format	Owner
Amdo Television	安多卫视	Amdo Tibetan	2006	SDTV (576i, 4:3)	Qinghai Radio and TV Station
Kangba Television	康巴卫视	Khams Tibetan	1999	SDTV (576i, 4:3)	Sichuan Radio and Television
Inner Mongolia Television Mongolian Channel	内蒙古卫视（蒙语）	Mongolian	1997	SDTV (576i, 4:3)	Inner Mongolia Television (NMTV)
Tibet Television Tibetan Channel	西藏卫视（藏语）	Standard Tibetan	2002	SDTV (576i, 4:3)	Xizang Television (XZTV)
Xinjiang Television Kazakh Channel	新疆卫视（哈语）	Kazakh	1997	SDTV (576i, 4:3)	Xinjiang Television (XJTV)
Xinjiang Television Uyghur Channel	新疆卫视（维语）	Uyghur	1997	SDTV (576i, 4:3)	Xinjiang Television (XJTV)
Yanbian Korean Television	延边卫视	Chinese Korean/Choson Korean	2006	HDTV(10 80i,16:9)	Yanbian Television (YBTV)

=== Children's channels ===
Name	Simplified Chinese	Origin	Launch	Format	Owner
Aniworld	金鹰卡通	Hunan	2005	SDTV (576i, 16:9), HDTV (1080i, 16:9)	Hunan Broadcasting System (HBS)

=== Premium satellite television ===
- Private Owned channel's with landed rights

Name	Simplified Chinese	Origin	Launch	Format	Owner
Macau Asia Satellite Television	澳亚卫视	Macau	2001	SDTV (576i, 4:3)	Macau Asia Satellite Television Co., Ltd
Macau Lotus Television	澳门莲花卫视	Macau	2002	SDTV (576i, 4:3)	Macau Lotus Television Co., Ltd
HKSTV	香港卫视	Hong Kong	2010	SDTV (576i, 16:9), HDTV (1080i,16:9)	Hong Kong Satellite TV International Media Group
Phoenix Television InfoNews	凤凰卫视资讯台	Hong Kong	2001	SDTV (576i, 16:9), HDTV (1080i, 16:9)	Phoenix Satellite Television Holdings., Ltd
Phoenix Television Movies	凤凰卫视电影台	Hong Kong	1998	SDTV (576i, 16:9), HDTV (1080i, 16:9)	Phoenix Satellite Television Holdings., Ltd
Phoenix Television Chinese	凤凰卫视中文台	Hong Kong	1996	SDTV (576i, 16:9), HDTV (1080i, 16:9)	Phoenix Satellite Television Holdings., Ltd
Phoenix Television Hong Kong	凤凰卫视香港台	Hong Kong	1996	SDTV (576i, 16:9), HDTV (1080i, 16:9)	Phoenix Satellite Television Holdings., Ltd
TVB Jade	无线电视翡翠台	Hong Kong	1967	SDTV (576i, 4:3), HDTV (1080i, 16:9)	Television Broadcasts Limited (TVB)
STAR TV	星空卫视	Hong Kong	1991	SDTV (576i, 16:9)	STAR Greater China., Ltd

== Other ==
- China Entertainment Television
- Phoenix Television

== Hong Kong ==
Hong Kong has two broadcast television networks, ATV and TVB. The latter, launched in 1967, was the territory's first free-to-air commercial station, and is currently the predominant TV station in the territory. Paid cable and satellite television have also been widespread. The production of Hong Kong's soap dramas, comedy series, and variety shows has reached mass audiences throughout the Chinese-speaking world. Broadcast media and news are provided by several companies, one of which is government-run. Television provides the major source of news and entertainment for the average family.

== Macau ==
Macau citizens can receive most of the terrestrial transmissions broadcast in Hong Kong.

== See also ==
- China Central Radio and TV University
- Chinese Central Television
- Telecommunications in China
- Media of China

== Sources ==
- Ying Zhu and Chris Berry (editors), TV China, Indiana University Press, 2009.
