= Ethnic broadcasting in China =

Ethnic broadcasting in China comprises both radio and TV broadcasting for some of the numerous ethnic groups within the country. Stations are found on the administrative levels of the nation as a whole, provinces, prefectures, and counties. They form a part of the ethnic media of China.

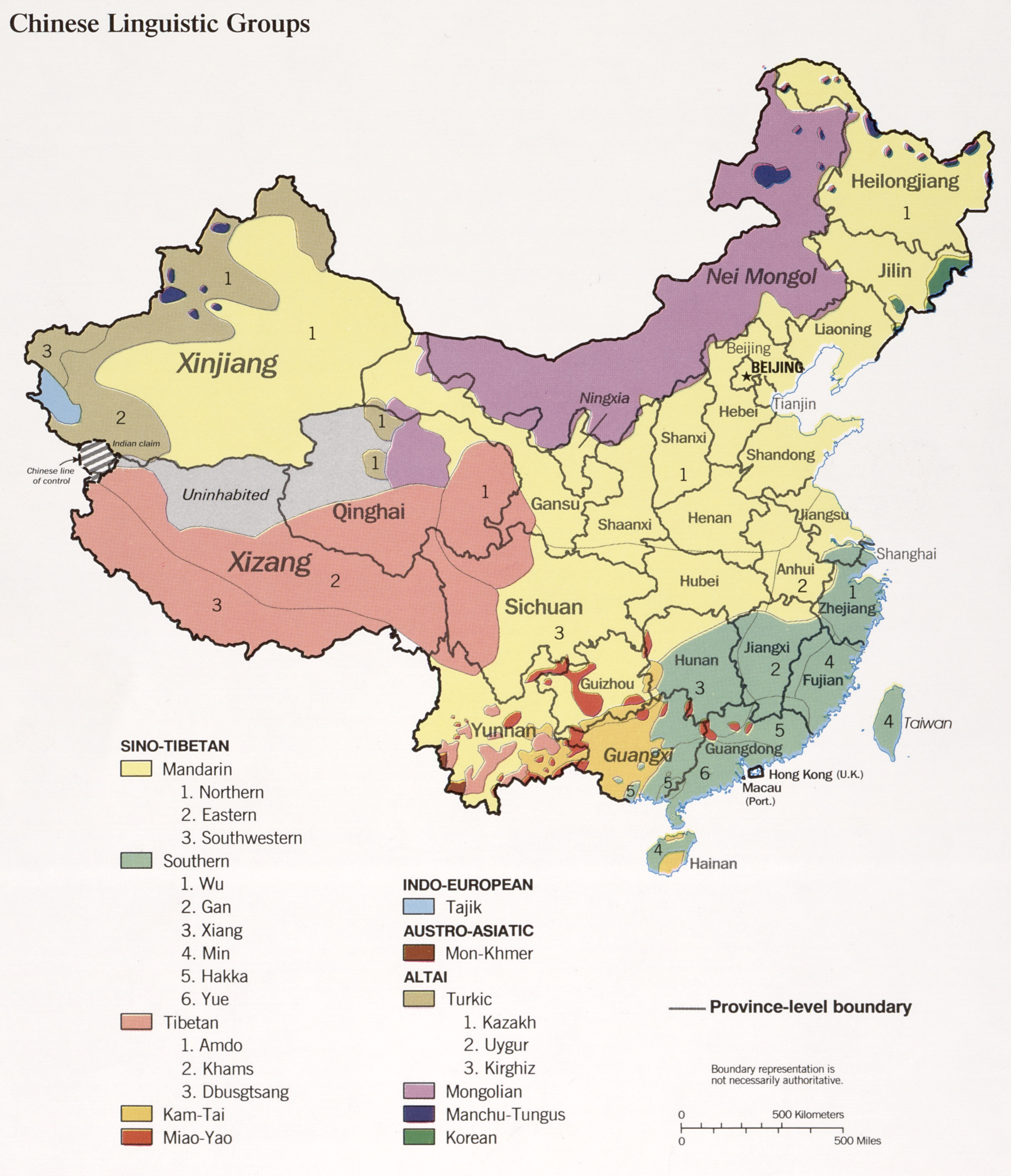
Map of ethnic groups in China

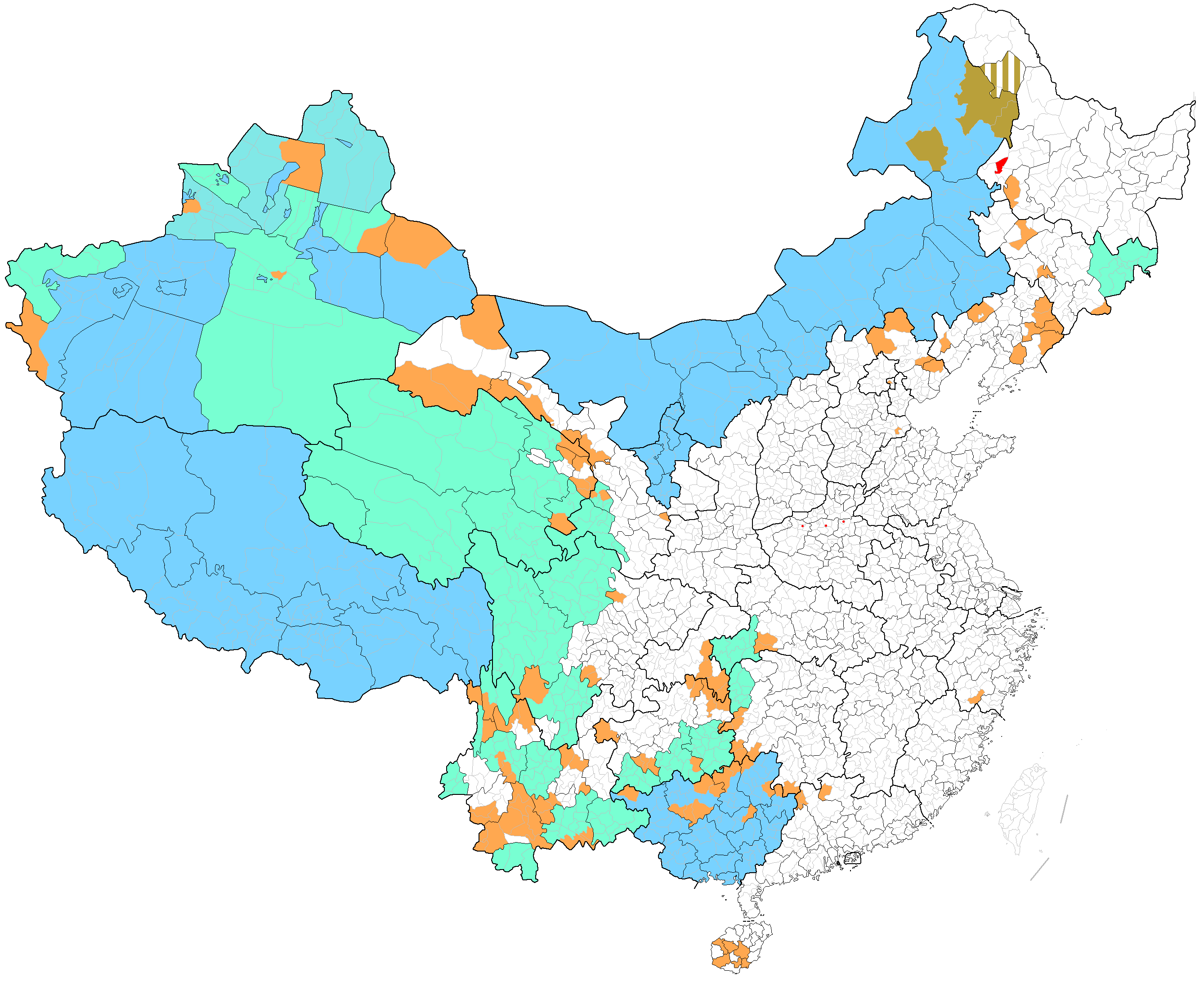
Autonomous administrative divisions of China

== National level ==
=== Radio ===
CMG – National Radio (CNR) 中央广播电视总台 – 中央人民广播电台 (央广)	Programme	Language
مەركىزىي خەلق رادىيو ئىستانسىسى ; Merkiziy xelq radiyo istansisi	Uyghur Radio 维吾尔语广播 ; Wéiwú'ěryǔ guǎngbò ئۇيغۇرچە رادىيو ; Uyghurche radiyo	Uyghur
ورتالىق حالىق راديو ستانسياسى ; Ortalyq xalyq radio stansiasy	Kazakh Radio 哈萨克语广播 ; Hāsàkèyǔ guǎngbò قازاق راديوسى ; Qazaq radiosy	Kazakh
ཀྲུང་དབྱང་མི་དམངས་ཀུན་ཁྱབ་རླུང་འཕྲིན་ལས་ཁུངས། ; Krung-dbyang mi-dmangs kun-khyab rlung-'phrin las-khungs	Tibetan Radio 藏语广播 ; Zàngyǔ guǎngbò བོད་སྐད་འཕྲིན་ལམ། ; Bod skad 'phrin lam	Tibetan
ᠲᠥᠪ ᠦᠨ ᠠᠷᠠᠳ ᠤᠨ ᠷᠠᠳᠢᠣ᠋ ᠨᠡᠪᠲᠡᠷᠡᠭᠦᠯᠭᠡ ᠵᠢᠨ ᠬᠣᠷᠢᠶ᠎ᠠ ; Töb-ün arad-un radio nebteregülge-ǰin qoriya	Sounds of the Nationalities 民族之声 ; Mínzú zhīshēng	Mongolian, Korean
중앙인민방송국 ; Jungang inmin bangsongguk	Sounds of the Nationalities 民族之声 ; Mínzú zhīshēng	Mongolian, Korean

=== Television ===
On television there are dubbed versions of the main central news programme Xinwen Lianbo in minority languages.

CMG – Central TV (CCTV) 中央广播电视总台 – 中国中央电视台 (央视)	News broadcast: 新闻联播 ; Xīnwén liánbò	Language
جۇڭگو مەركىزىي تېلېۋىزىيە ئىستانسى ; Junggo merkiziy tëlëwiziye istansi	مەملىكەت خەۋەرلىرى خەلقئارا خەۋەرلەر ; Memliket xewerliri xelqara xewerler	Uyghur
جۇڭگو ورتالىق تەلەۆيزياسى ; Juñgo ortalyq televiziasy	مەملەكەتتىك حالىقارالىق حابارلار ; Memlekettyk xalyqaralyq xabarlar	Kazakh
ཀྲུང་གོ་ཀྲུང་དབྱང་བརྙན་འཕྲིན། ; Krung-go krung-dbyang brnyan-'phrin	གསར་འགྱུར་མཉམ་བསྒྲགས། ; Gsar 'gyur mnyam bsgrags	Tibetan
ᠬᠢᠲᠠᠳ ᠤᠨ ᠲᠥᠪ ᠲᠧᠯᠸᠢᠰ ; Qitad-un töb telvis	ᠲᠥᠪ ᠲᠧᠯᠸᠢᠰ ᠦᠨ ᠰᠣᠨᠢᠨ ᠮᠡᠳᠡᠭᠡᠨ ᠦ ᠳᠠᠮᠵᠢᠭᠤᠯᠬᠤ ᠨᠡᠪᠲᠡᠷᠡᠭᠦᠯᠭᠡ; Töb telvis-ün sonin medegen-ü damǰiɣulqu nebteregülge	Mongolian
중국중앙텔레비전 ; Jungguk jungang tellebijeon	국내외뉴스 ; Gungnaeoe nyuseu	Korean

== Provincial and prefectural level ==
On provincial level there were 36 broadcasters in 2022; 8 of them had minority language programmes. On prefectural level there were about 350 broadcasters; about 40 of them carried programmes in minority languages.

=== Xinjiang Uyghur Autonomous Region ===
Station	Programme	Language
Xinjiang Radio and Television (until 2018 XJBS and XJTV) 新疆广播电视台 ; Xīnjiāng guǎngbò diànshìtái شىنجاڭ رادىيو-تېلېۋىزىيە ئىستانسىسى ; Shinjang radiyo-tëlëwiziye istansisi شينجياڭ راديو-تەلەۆيزيا ستانسياسى ; Şinjiañ radio-televizia stansiasy ᠰᠢᠨᠵᠢᠶᠠᠩ ᠤᠨ ᠷᠠᠳᠢᠣ᠋ ᠲᠧᠯᠸᠢᠰ ᠬᠣᠷᠢᠶ᠎ᠠ ; Sinǰiyang-un radio telvis qoriya	Uyghur General Radio 维吾尔语综合广播 ; Wéiwú'ěryǔ zònghé guǎngbò ئۇيغۇرچە ئۈنۋېرسال رادىيو ; Uyghurche ünwërsal radiyo	Uyghur
Xinjiang Radio and Television (until 2018 XJBS and XJTV) 新疆广播电视台 ; Xīnjiāng guǎngbò diànshìtái شىنجاڭ رادىيو-تېلېۋىزىيە ئىستانسىسى ; Shinjang radiyo-tëlëwiziye istansisi شينجياڭ راديو-تەلەۆيزيا ستانسياسى ; Şinjiañ radio-televizia stansiasy ᠰᠢᠨᠵᠢᠶᠠᠩ ᠤᠨ ᠷᠠᠳᠢᠣ᠋ ᠲᠧᠯᠸᠢᠰ ᠬᠣᠷᠢᠶ᠎ᠠ ; Sinǰiyang-un radio telvis qoriya	Traffic and Arts Radio 维吾尔语交通文艺 ; Wéiwú'ěryǔ jiāotōng wényì قاتناش سەنئەت رادىيوسى ; Qatnash sen'et radiyosi	Uyghur
Xinjiang Radio and Television (until 2018 XJBS and XJTV) 新疆广播电视台 ; Xīnjiāng guǎngbò diànshìtái شىنجاڭ رادىيو-تېلېۋىزىيە ئىستانسىسى ; Shinjang radiyo-tëlëwiziye istansisi شينجياڭ راديو-تەلەۆيزيا ستانسياسى ; Şinjiañ radio-televizia stansiasy ᠰᠢᠨᠵᠢᠶᠠᠩ ᠤᠨ ᠷᠠᠳᠢᠣ᠋ ᠲᠧᠯᠸᠢᠰ ᠬᠣᠷᠢᠶ᠎ᠠ ; Sinǰiyang-un radio telvis qoriya	Kazakh Radio 哈萨克语广播 ; Hāsàkèyǔ guǎngbò قازاق راديوسى ; Qazaq radiosy	Kazakh
Xinjiang Radio and Television (until 2018 XJBS and XJTV) 新疆广播电视台 ; Xīnjiāng guǎngbò diànshìtái شىنجاڭ رادىيو-تېلېۋىزىيە ئىستانسىسى ; Shinjang radiyo-tëlëwiziye istansisi شينجياڭ راديو-تەلەۆيزيا ستانسياسى ; Şinjiañ radio-televizia stansiasy ᠰᠢᠨᠵᠢᠶᠠᠩ ᠤᠨ ᠷᠠᠳᠢᠣ᠋ ᠲᠧᠯᠸᠢᠰ ᠬᠣᠷᠢᠶ᠎ᠠ ; Sinǰiyang-un radio telvis qoriya	Mongolian Radio 蒙古语广播 ; Ménggǔyǔ guǎngbò ᠮᠣᠩᠭᠣᠯ ᠬᠡᠯᠡᠨ ᠦ ᠷᠠᠳᠢᠣ᠋ ; Moŋɣol qelen-ü radio	Mongolian
Xinjiang Radio and Television (until 2018 XJBS and XJTV) 新疆广播电视台 ; Xīnjiāng guǎngbò diànshìtái شىنجاڭ رادىيو-تېلېۋىزىيە ئىستانسىسى ; Shinjang radiyo-tëlëwiziye istansisi شينجياڭ راديو-تەلەۆيزيا ستانسياسى ; Şinjiañ radio-televizia stansiasy ᠰᠢᠨᠵᠢᠶᠠᠩ ᠤᠨ ᠷᠠᠳᠢᠣ᠋ ᠲᠧᠯᠸᠢᠰ ᠬᠣᠷᠢᠶ᠎ᠠ ; Sinǰiyang-un radio telvis qoriya	Kyrgyz Radio 柯尔克孜语广播 ; Kē'ěrkèzīyǔ guǎngbò قىرعىز رادىيوسۇ ; Qirğiz radiyosu	Kyrgyz
Xinjiang Radio and Television (until 2018 XJBS and XJTV) 新疆广播电视台 ; Xīnjiāng guǎngbò diànshìtái شىنجاڭ رادىيو-تېلېۋىزىيە ئىستانسىسى ; Shinjang radiyo-tëlëwiziye istansisi شينجياڭ راديو-تەلەۆيزيا ستانسياسى ; Şinjiañ radio-televizia stansiasy ᠰᠢᠨᠵᠢᠶᠠᠩ ᠤᠨ ᠷᠠᠳᠢᠣ᠋ ᠲᠧᠯᠸᠢᠰ ᠬᠣᠷᠢᠶ᠎ᠠ ; Sinǰiyang-un radio telvis qoriya	XJTV-2 Uyghur Information Channel ئاخبارات ئۇنىۋېرسال قانىلى ; Axbarat uniwërsal qanili	Uyghur
Xinjiang Radio and Television (until 2018 XJBS and XJTV) 新疆广播电视台 ; Xīnjiāng guǎngbò diànshìtái شىنجاڭ رادىيو-تېلېۋىزىيە ئىستانسىسى ; Shinjang radiyo-tëlëwiziye istansisi شينجياڭ راديو-تەلەۆيزيا ستانسياسى ; Şinjiañ radio-televizia stansiasy ᠰᠢᠨᠵᠢᠶᠠᠩ ᠤᠨ ᠷᠠᠳᠢᠣ᠋ ᠲᠧᠯᠸᠢᠰ ᠬᠣᠷᠢᠶ᠎ᠠ ; Sinǰiyang-un radio telvis qoriya	XJTV-5 Drama Channel تىياتىر قانىلى ; Tiyatir qanili	Uyghur
Xinjiang Radio and Television (until 2018 XJBS and XJTV) 新疆广播电视台 ; Xīnjiāng guǎngbò diànshìtái شىنجاڭ رادىيو-تېلېۋىزىيە ئىستانسىسى ; Shinjang radiyo-tëlëwiziye istansisi شينجياڭ راديو-تەلەۆيزيا ستانسياسى ; Şinjiañ radio-televizia stansiasy ᠰᠢᠨᠵᠢᠶᠠᠩ ᠤᠨ ᠷᠠᠳᠢᠣ᠋ ᠲᠧᠯᠸᠢᠰ ᠬᠣᠷᠢᠶ᠎ᠠ ; Sinǰiyang-un radio telvis qoriya	XJTV-9 Economic Life Channel ئىقتىساد-تۇرمۇش قانىلى ; Iqtisad-turmush qanili	Uyghur
Xinjiang Radio and Television (until 2018 XJBS and XJTV) 新疆广播电视台 ; Xīnjiāng guǎngbò diànshìtái شىنجاڭ رادىيو-تېلېۋىزىيە ئىستانسىسى ; Shinjang radiyo-tëlëwiziye istansisi شينجياڭ راديو-تەلەۆيزيا ستانسياسى ; Şinjiañ radio-televizia stansiasy ᠰᠢᠨᠵᠢᠶᠠᠩ ᠤᠨ ᠷᠠᠳᠢᠣ᠋ ᠲᠧᠯᠸᠢᠰ ᠬᠣᠷᠢᠶ᠎ᠠ ; Sinǰiyang-un radio telvis qoriya	XJTV-3 Kazakh News Channel حابار امبەباپ ارناسى ; Habar ämbebap arnasy	Kazakh
Xinjiang Radio and Television (until 2018 XJBS and XJTV) 新疆广播电视台 ; Xīnjiāng guǎngbò diànshìtái شىنجاڭ رادىيو-تېلېۋىزىيە ئىستانسىسى ; Shinjang radiyo-tëlëwiziye istansisi شينجياڭ راديو-تەلەۆيزيا ستانسياسى ; Şinjiañ radio-televizia stansiasy ᠰᠢᠨᠵᠢᠶᠠᠩ ᠤᠨ ᠷᠠᠳᠢᠣ᠋ ᠲᠧᠯᠸᠢᠰ ᠬᠣᠷᠢᠶ᠎ᠠ ; Sinǰiyang-un radio telvis qoriya	XJTV-8 Variety Channel الۋان ونەر ارناسى ; Aluan öner arnasy	Kazakh
Xinjiang Radio and Television (until 2018 XJBS and XJTV) 新疆广播电视台 ; Xīnjiāng guǎngbò diànshìtái شىنجاڭ رادىيو-تېلېۋىزىيە ئىستانسىسى ; Shinjang radiyo-tëlëwiziye istansisi شينجياڭ راديو-تەلەۆيزيا ستانسياسى ; Şinjiañ radio-televizia stansiasy ᠰᠢᠨᠵᠢᠶᠠᠩ ᠤᠨ ᠷᠠᠳᠢᠣ᠋ ᠲᠧᠯᠸᠢᠰ ᠬᠣᠷᠢᠶ᠎ᠠ ; Sinǰiyang-un radio telvis qoriya	XJTV-12 Multilingual Children's Channel ئۆسمۈرلەر قانىلى ; Ösmürler qanili	Chinese, Uyghur, Kazakh

On prefectural level there were 13 stations with programmes in Uyghur (including Ürümqi), Kazakh (Ili, Tacheng, Altay), Kyrgyz (Kizilsu), and Mongolian (Bortala and Bayingolin). Within the 8th Division of the Xinjiang Production and Construction Corps there was the Shihezi People's Broadcasting Station with programmes in Uyghur.

=== Inner Mongolia Autonomous Region ===
Station	Programme	Language
Inner Mongolia Radio and Television (until 2016 NMRB and NMTV) 内蒙古广播电视台 ; Nèiménggǔ guǎngbò diànshìtái ᠥᠪᠦᠷ ᠮᠣᠩᠭᠣᠯ ᠤᠨ ᠷᠠᠳᠢᠣ᠋ ᠲᠧᠯᠸᠢᠰ ᠬᠣᠷᠢᠶ᠎ᠠ ; Öbür Moŋɣol-un radio telvis qoriy᠎a Өвөр Монголын радио телевиз хороо	Mongolian Radio 蒙语广播 ; Méngyǔ guǎngbò ᠮᠣᠩᠭᠣᠯ ᠷᠠᠳᠢᠣ᠋ ; Moŋɣol radio Монгол радио	Mongolian
Inner Mongolia Radio and Television (until 2016 NMRB and NMTV) 内蒙古广播电视台 ; Nèiménggǔ guǎngbò diànshìtái ᠥᠪᠦᠷ ᠮᠣᠩᠭᠣᠯ ᠤᠨ ᠷᠠᠳᠢᠣ᠋ ᠲᠧᠯᠸᠢᠰ ᠬᠣᠷᠢᠶ᠎ᠠ ; Öbür Moŋɣol-un radio telvis qoriy᠎a Өвөр Монголын радио телевиз хороо	Voice of the Grassland 草原之声 ; Cǎoyuán zhīshēng ᠲᠠᠯ᠎ᠠ ᠶᠢᠨ ᠳᠠᠭᠤ ᠬᠣᠭᠤᠯᠠᠢ ; Tal-a-yin daɣu qoɣulai Талын дуу хоолой	Mongolian
Inner Mongolia Radio and Television (until 2016 NMRB and NMTV) 内蒙古广播电视台 ; Nèiménggǔ guǎngbò diànshìtái ᠥᠪᠦᠷ ᠮᠣᠩᠭᠣᠯ ᠤᠨ ᠷᠠᠳᠢᠣ᠋ ᠲᠧᠯᠸᠢᠰ ᠬᠣᠷᠢᠶ᠎ᠠ ; Öbür Moŋɣol-un radio telvis qoriy᠎a Өвөр Монголын радио телевиз хороо	Satellite TV Channel 蒙古语卫视频道 ; Ménggǔyǔ wèishì píndào ᠣᠳᠤᠨ ᠲᠧᠯᠸᠢᠰ ; Odun telvis Одон телевиз	Mongolian
Inner Mongolia Radio and Television (until 2016 NMRB and NMTV) 内蒙古广播电视台 ; Nèiménggǔ guǎngbò diànshìtái ᠥᠪᠦᠷ ᠮᠣᠩᠭᠣᠯ ᠤᠨ ᠷᠠᠳᠢᠣ᠋ ᠲᠧᠯᠸᠢᠰ ᠬᠣᠷᠢᠶ᠎ᠠ ; Öbür Moŋɣol-un radio telvis qoriy᠎a Өвөр Монголын радио телевиз хороо	Culture Channel 蒙语文化频道 ; Méngyǔ wénhuà píndào ᠰᠣᠶᠤᠯ ᠰᠢᠨᠵᠢᠯᠡᠭᠡ ; Soyul sinǰilege Соёл шинжилгээ	Mongolian

On prefectural level there were 12 stations with programmes in Mongolian (including Hohhot and Ordos).

=== Liaoning Province ===
In Liaoning there was 1 station with programmes in Mongolian on prefectural level (Fuxin).

=== Heilongjiang Province ===
Station	Programme	Language
Heilongjiang Radio and Television 黑龙江广播电视台 ; Hēilóngjiāng guǎngbò diànshìtái	Heilongjiang Korean Broadcasting Station (since 1963) 흑룡강 조선어 방송국 ; Heungnyonggang joseoneo bangsongguk	Korean

=== Jilin Province ===
In Jilin there was 1 station with programmes in Korean on prefectural level (Yanbian).

Station	Programme	Language
Yanbian Radio and Television (YBRT) 延边广播电视台 ; Yánbiān guǎngbò diànshìtái 연변라지오TV방송국 ; Yeonbyeon rajio TV bangsongguk	General News 뉴스종합방송 AM ; Nyuseu jonghap bangsong	Korean
Yanbian Radio and Television (YBRT) 延边广播电视台 ; Yánbiān guǎngbò diànshìtái 연변라지오TV방송국 ; Yeonbyeon rajio TV bangsongguk	Literary Life 문예생활방송 FM ; Munye saenghwal bangson	Korean
Yanbian Radio and Television (YBRT) 延边广播电视台 ; Yánbiān guǎngbò diànshìtái 연변라지오TV방송국 ; Yeonbyeon rajio TV bangsongguk	Yanbian Satellite (since 2006) 연변위성 ; Yeonbyeon wiseong	Korean
Yanbian Radio and Television (YBRT) 延边广播电视台 ; Yánbiān guǎngbò diànshìtái 연변라지오TV방송국 ; Yeonbyeon rajio TV bangsongguk	YBTV-1 연변TV1 ; Yeonbyeon TV1 (News: 연변뉴스 ; Yeonbyeon nyuseu)	Korean
Yanbian Radio and Television (YBRT) 延边广播电视台 ; Yánbiān guǎngbò diànshìtái 연변라지오TV방송국 ; Yeonbyeon rajio TV bangsongguk	YBTV-2 연변TV2 ; Yeonbyeon TV2	Korean

=== Tibet Autonomous Region ===
Station	Programme	Language
Tibet Radio and Television (until 2018 CTB and XZTV) 西藏广播电视台 ; Xīzàng guǎngbò diànshìtái བོད་ལྗོངས་རླུང་འཕྲིན་བརྙན་འཕྲིན་ལས་ཁུངས། ; Bod ljongs rlung 'phrin brnyan 'phrin las khungs	Tibetan Broadcasting བོད་སྐད་རྒྱང་བསྒྲགས། ; Bod skad rgyang bsgrags	Tibetan
Tibet Radio and Television (until 2018 CTB and XZTV) 西藏广播电视台 ; Xīzàng guǎngbò diànshìtái བོད་ལྗོངས་རླུང་འཕྲིན་བརྙན་འཕྲིན་ལས་ཁུངས། ; Bod ljongs rlung 'phrin brnyan 'phrin las khungs	Science and Education Radio ཚན་རིག་སློབ་གསོའི་རླུང་འཕྲིན། ; Tshan rig slob gso'i rlung 'phrin	Tibetan
Tibet Radio and Television (until 2018 CTB and XZTV) 西藏广播电视台 ; Xīzàng guǎngbò diànshìtái བོད་ལྗོངས་རླུང་འཕྲིན་བརྙན་འཕྲིན་ལས་ཁུངས། ; Bod ljongs rlung 'phrin brnyan 'phrin las khungs	Khams Radio ཁམས་པའི་སྐད་ཆ་རླུང་འཕྲིན། ; Khams pa'i skad cha rlung 'phrin	Khams Tibetan
Tibet Radio and Television (until 2018 CTB and XZTV) 西藏广播电视台 ; Xīzàng guǎngbò diànshìtái བོད་ལྗོངས་རླུང་འཕྲིན་བརྙན་འཕྲིན་ལས་ཁུངས། ; Bod ljongs rlung 'phrin brnyan 'phrin las khungs	Tibetan Television བོད་སྐད་བརྙན་འཕྲིན། ; Bod skad brnyan 'phrin	Tibetan

On prefectural level there were 7 stations with programmes in Tibetan (including Lhasa).

=== Qinghai Province ===
Station	Programme	Language
Qinghai Radio and Television 青海广播电视台 ; Qīnghǎi guǎngbò diànshìtái	Qinghai Tibetan Radio མཚོ་སྔོན་བོད་སྐད་རྒྱང་སྒྲོག། ; Mtsho sngon bod skad rgyang sgrog	Amdo Tibetan
Qinghai Radio and Television 青海广播电视台 ; Qīnghǎi guǎngbò diànshìtái	Amdo TV ཨ་མདོ་བརྙན་འཕྲིན། ; A mdo brnyan 'phrin	Amdo Tibetan

On prefectural level there were 2 stations with programmes in Tibetan (Haixi and Yushu).

=== Gansu Province ===
In Gansu there was 1 station with programmes in Tibetan on prefectural level (Gannan).

Station	Programme	Language
Gannan Radio and Television (GNRTV) 甘南广播电视台 ; Gānnán guǎngbò diànshìtái ཀན་ལྷོ་རྒྱང་སྒྲོག་བརྙན་འཕྲིན་ཁང། ; Kan lho rgyang sgrog brnyan 'phrin khang	Radio	Amdo Tibetan
Gannan Radio and Television (GNRTV) 甘南广播电视台 ; Gānnán guǎngbò diànshìtái ཀན་ལྷོ་རྒྱང་སྒྲོག་བརྙན་འཕྲིན་ཁང། ; Kan lho rgyang sgrog brnyan 'phrin khang	GN-2	Amdo Tibetan

=== Sichuan Province ===
Station	Programme	Language
Sichuan Radio and Television (SRT) 四川广播电视台 ; Sìchuān guǎngbò diànshìtái	Sichuan Ethnic Radio 四川民族广播 ; Sìchuān mínzú guǎngbò སི་ཁྲོན་མི་རིགས་རླུང་འཕྲིན། ; Si khron mi rigs rlung 'phrin ꌧꍧꊿꋅꅇꁊ ; Sypchuo cocux ddopput	Khams Tibetan, Nuosu
Sichuan Radio and Television (SRT) 四川广播电视台 ; Sìchuān guǎngbò diànshìtái	Kangba TV (SCTV-11) 康巴卫视网 ; Kāngbā wèishì wǎng ཁམས་པའི་བརྙན་འཕྲིན་དྲ་བ། ; Khams pa'i brnyan 'phrin dra ba	Khams Tibetan

On prefectural level there were 2 stations with programmes in Tibetan (Garzê and Ngawa) and 1 station with programmes in Nuosu (Liangshan).

=== Yunnan Province ===
Station	Programme	Language
Yunnan Media Group (YMG) 云南广播电视台 ; Yúnnán guǎngbò diànshìtái	Ethnic Radio 民族广播 ; Mínzú guǎngbò	Tai Lü, Tai Nüa, Jingpo, Lahu, Lisu

On prefectural level there were 3 stations with minority language programmes (Dêqên Tibetan, Dehong Dai and Jingpo, Xishuangbanna Dai).

=== Guangxi Zhuang Autonomous Region ===
Station	Programme	Language
Guangxi Radio and Television (GXBTV) 广西广播电视台 ; Guǎngxī guǎngbò diànshìtái	Zhuang news Vahcueng Sinhvwnz 壮语新闻 ; Zhuàng yǔ xīnwén	Zhuang

== Literature ==
- NRTA: 国家广播电视总局 播出机构（频道）
- Hóngxiá, Sī; Xiăohuá, Lĭ (2013), "Use of language in radio and television broadcasting", in Yŭmíng, Lĭ (ed.), The language situation in China, vol. 1, De Gruyter, pp. 85–96, ISBN 978-1-61451-311-7
- Abduweli Yusup (2009), Die Fernsehnutzung von uigurischen Kindern und Jugendlichen in Xinjiang: einen Weg zur gesellschaftlichen Integration? [Uyghur children's and youngster's TV viewing in Xinjiang: a way towards social integration?] (Thesis) (in German), Erfurt: Universität, urn:nbn:de:gbv:547-200900052
