= 2010 FIFA World Cup broadcasting rights =

FIFA, through several companies, sold the rights for the broadcast of 2010 FIFA World Cup to the following broadcasters.

== Television ==
Broadcasters that screened some or all of the matches in high definition are in bold. Broadcasters that screened matches in 3D are italicised.

Country	Broadcaster(s)	Source
**Albania**	Free-to-air: RTSH; Cable/Satellite (pay): **SuperSport Albania (DigitAlb)**	
**Andorra**	Free-to-air: **TF1**, **France Télévisions**	
**Argentina**	Free-to-air: **Canal 7**, Telefe; Cable (pay): TyC Sports; Satellite (pay): **DirecTV Sports**	
**Armenia**	Free-to-air: Public Television of Armenia (56 matches); Free-to-air (Yerevan): Ararat TV (8 matches)	
**Australia**	Free-to-air: **SBS**	
**Austria**	Free-to-air: **ORF**	
**Azerbaijan**	Free-to-air: Lider TV	
**Bangladesh**	Free-to-air: Bangladesh Television; Satellite (pay): ESPN Star Sports	
**Belarus**	Free-to-air: BTRC	
**Belgium**	Dutch: Free-to-air: **VRT**	
**Belgium**	French: Free-to-air: **RTBF**	
**Bhutan**	Satellite (pay): ESPN STAR Sports	
**Bolivia**	Free-to-air: Unitel, Red Uno	
**Bosnia and Herzegovina**	Free-to-air: BHRT	
**Brazil**	Free-to-air: **Rede Globo**, **Rede Bandeirantes**; Cable/satellite (pay): **SporTV**, BandSports, **ESPN Brasil**	
**Bulgaria**	Free-to-air: **BNT**	
**Cambodia**	Free-to-air: CTN, MyTV	
**Canada**	English: Free-to-air: **CBC**; Cable/satellite (pay): **Bold** (8 group stage matches live, nightly encores)	
**Canada**	French: Free-to-air: **SRC**	
**Canada**	Spanish and Italian: Cable/satellite (pay): Telelatino	
**Chile**	Free-to-air: **TVN** (33 matches); Satellite (pay): **DirecTV Sports** (all matches)	
**People's Republic of China**	Free-to-air: **CCTV** (all matches, 56 matches live on CCTV-5, 4 on CCTV-1, 4 on CCTV-7) CCTV-HD (all matches in HD, 56 matches live)	
**Colombia**	Free-to-air: Caracol, RCN (40 matches total); Satellite (pay): **DirecTV Sports** (all matches)	
**Costa Rica**	Free-to-air: **Teletica**, **Repretel**	
**Croatia**	Free-to-air: HRT	
**Cyprus**	Free-to-air: CyBC	
**Czech Republic**	Free-to-air: **ČT**	
**Denmark**	Free-to-air: **DR** (10 matches), **TV2** (32 matches); Cable/Satellite (pay): **Canal 9** (21 matches)	
**Ecuador**	Free-to-air: Gama, TC; Satellite (pay): **DirecTV Sports**	
**El Salvador**	Free-to-air: TCS	
**Estonia**	Free-to-air: **ERR**	
**Fiji**	Free-to-air: Mai TV	
**Finland**	Free-to-air: **YLE**	
**France** and overseas territories	Free-to-air: **TF1** (27 matches), **France Télévisions** (37 matches); Satellite/cable/IPTV (pay): **Canal+** (37 matches, 8 exclusive)	
**Georgia**	Free-to-air: GPB (all matches)	
**Germany**	Free-to-air: **ARD** (28 matches), **ZDF** (27 matches), **RTL** (9 matches); Satellite (pay): **Sky Deutschland** (all matches)	
**Greece**	Free-to-air: ERT	
**Guatemala**	Free-to-air: Televisiete, Canal 3	
**Honduras**	Free-to-air: TVC, Vica TV	
**Hong Kong**	Free-to-air: **ATV** (1 match – opening), **TVB** (3 matches – 2 semi-final and final); Cable (pay): **Cable TV Hong Kong** (all matches)	
**Hungary**	Free-to-air: **MTV**	
**Iceland**	Free-to-air: RÚV (46 matches); Cable (pay): Stöð 2 Sport (18 matches)	
**India**	Free-to-air: Doordarshan; Satellite (pay): ESPN STAR Sports	
**Indonesia**	Free-to-air: MNC Media (**RCTI** (46 matches), Global TV (20 matches))	
**Iran**	Free-to-air: IRIB	
**Ireland**	Free-to-air: RTÉ	
**Israel**	Hebrew: Free-to-air: **Channel 1** (48 matches), Channel 33 (when two matches are played at the same time, 7 matches), Channel 2 (broadcast by Reshet, 9 matches); Cable/satellite (pay): **Sport 5** (HD feed of the 9 matches aired by Channel 2)	
**Israel**	Arabic: Free-to-air: Channel 33	
**Italy**	Free-to-air: **RAI** (one match per day); Satellite (pay): **SKY Italia** (all matches)	
**Japan**	Free-to-air: **NHK** (22 matches), **Nippon TV/NNN-NNS** (5 matches), **Fuji TV/FNN-FNS** (5 matches), **TBS/JNN** (5 matches), **TV Asahi/ANN** (4 matches), **TV Tokyo/TXN** (3 matches); Satellite (pay): **SKY PerfecTV!** (all matches)	
**North Korea**	Free-to-air: KCTV (Broadcasting rights obtained through ABU)	
**South Korea**	Free-to-air: **SBS**; Cable/satellite (pay): **SBS Sports**; 3D coverages produced by SBS were broadcast on 3D channel of each pay television providers.	
**Kosovo**	Free-to-air: RTK	
**Latvia**	Free-to-air: LTV	
**Liechtenstein**	Free-to-air: **SRG SSR idée suisse** (SF)	
**Lithuania**	Free-to-air: LRT (46 matches), LNK (18 matches)	
**Luxembourg**	Free-to-air: RTL	
**Macau**	Free-to-air: **TDM**	
**Macedonia**	Free-to-air: **MRTV**	
**Malaysia**	Free-to-air: RTM, Satellite (pay): **Astro** (all matches)	
**Maldives**	Free-to-air: Television Maldives, Cable (pay): **MediaNet** (all matches)	
**Mali**	Free-to-air: ORTM, Terrestrial (all matches)	
**Malta**	Free-to-air: PBS (46 matches); Satellite (pay): Melita Sports (all matches)	
**Mexico**	Free-to-air: **TV Azteca**, **Televisa**; Cable (pay): **TVC Deportes**, **Televisa Deportes Network**; Satellite (pay): **SKY México**	
**Republic of Moldova**	Free-to-air: TRM	
**Mongolia**	Free-to-air: C1 Television Mongolia	
**Monaco**	Free-to-air: **TF1**, **France Télévisions**	
**Montenegro**	Free-to-air: RTCG	
**Netherlands**	Free-to-air: **NOS** through NPO channels	
**Nepal**	Free-to-air: NTV; Satellite (pay): ESPN STAR Sports	
**New Zealand**	Free-to-air: TVNZ (22 matches); Satellite (pay): Sky (all matches)	
**Nicaragua**	Free-to-air: Televicentro	
**Norway**	Terrestrial (pay): TV2 (32 matches); Satellite (pay): Viasat (32 matches; rights purchased from NRK)	
**Pakistan**	Free-to-air: PTV; Cable (pay): TEN Sports (rights purchased from ESPN Star Sports)	
**Panama**	Free-to-air: RPC, TVMax (40 matches total); Cable (pay): **Cableonda Sports** (24 matches)	
**Paraguay**	Free-to-air: SNT	
**Peru**	Free-to-air: **ATV**; Satellite (pay): **DirecTV Sports** (all matches)	
**Philippines**	Free-to-air: ABS-CBN, Studio 23; Cable (pay): Balls	
**Poland**	Free-to-air: **TVP**	
**Portugal**	Free-to-air: **RTP** (28 matches), SIC (18 matches); Cable/satellite/IPTV (pay): **SportTV** (all matches; 18 are exclusive)	
**Romania**	Free-to-air: **TVR**	
**Russia**	Free-to-air: **Channel One** (26 matches), **VGTRK** (38 matches)	
**San Marino**	Free-to-air: RAI	
**Senegal**	Free-to-air: RTS, Terrestrial (all matches)	
**Serbia**	Free-to-air: **RTS**	
**Singapore**	Free-to-air: **MediaCorp** (4 matches); Cable (pay): **StarHub TV** (all matches); IPTV (pay): **mio TV** (all matches)	
**Slovakia**	Free-to-air: STV	
**Slovenia**	Free-to-air: **RTV Slovenija**	
**South Africa**	Free-to-air: SABC; Satellite (pay): **Supersport**	
**Spain**	Free-to-air: Telecinco (8 matches), Cuatro (16 matches); Satellite (pay): **Canal+** (all matches)	
**Sri Lanka**	Free-to-air: SLRC – Channel Eye; Satellite (pay): ESPN Star Sports	
**Sweden**	Free-to-air: **SVT** (32 matches), **TV4** (32 matches)	
**Switzerland**	Free-to-air: **SRG SSR idée suisse**	
**Taiwan**	Cable (pay): Era Television; IPTV (pay): ELTA TV	
**Thailand**	Free-to-air: TV3, TV7, MCOT9, NBT11 (all matches); Satellite (pay): **TrueVisions**	
**Turkey**	Free-to-air: **TRT**	
**Ukraine**	Free-to-air: UT1, ICTV	
**United Kingdom** (England, Scotland, Northern Ireland, Wales)	Free-to-air: **BBC** (31 Games + Coverage of the Final shared with ITV); **ITV** (32 Games + Coverage of the Final Shared with BBC); Cable/satellite (pay): British Eurosport, ESPN UK (highlights)	
**United States** and territories: American Samoa; Guam; Northern Mariana Islands; Puerto Rico; U.S. Virgin Islands	English: Free-to-air: **ABC** (10 matches); Cable/satellite (pay): **ESPN** (54 matches)	
**United States** and territories: American Samoa; Guam; Northern Mariana Islands; Puerto Rico; U.S. Virgin Islands	Spanish: Free-to-air: **Univision** (56 matches), Telefutura (8 matches); Cable/satellite (pay): Galavisión (nightly encores)	
**United States** and territories: American Samoa; Guam; Northern Mariana Islands; Puerto Rico; U.S. Virgin Islands	Portuguese: Cable/satellite (pay): ESPN Deportes (40 matches)	
**Uzbekistan**	Free-to-air: **NTRC**	
**Vietnam**	Free-to-air: VTV, HTV Satellite (pay): VTC (HD only)	
**Vatican City**	Free-to-air: **RAI**	
**Venezuela**	Free-to-air: Meridiano, Venevisión; Satellite (pay): **DirecTV Sports** (all matches)	
**Middle East and North Africa** List of countries: Algeria; Bahrain; Comoros; Djibouti; Egypt; Iraq; Jordan; Kuwait; Lebanon; Oman; Palestinian Authority; Libya; Mauritania; Morocco; Qatar; Saudi Arabia; Somalia; Sudan; Syria; Tunisia; United Arab Emirates; Yemen	Satellite (pay): **Al Jazeera Sports** (Note: Rights were held by ART until Al Jazeera purchased all of ART's sport-related rights and content on 24 November 2009.)	
**Sub-Saharan Africa** List of countries: Free to air broadcasters listed in parentheses; Angola (TPA); Benin (ORTB); Botswana (BRTS); Burkina Faso (TNB); Burundi (RTNB); Cameroon (CRTV); Cape Verde (RTVCV); Central African Republic (RTC); Chad (RTNT); Congo (TNC); Côte d'Ivoire (RTI); DR Congo (RTNC); Equatorial Guinea (RDEG); Eritrea (EBC); Ethiopia (ETS); Gabon (RTG); Gambia (GRTS); Ghana (GTV); Guinea-Bissau (RTVGB); Guinea-Conakry (RTG); Kenya (KBC); Lesotho (LBC); Liberia (LBS); Madagascar (RTNM); Malawi (MBC); Mali (ORTM); Mauritius (MBC); Mozambique (TDM, Soico); Namibia (NBC); Niger (TS); Nigeria (NTA); Rwanda (TVR); Senegal (RTS); Seychelles (SBC); Sierra Leone (SLBS); Swaziland (STVA); Tanzania (TBC); Togo (TVT); Uganda (UBC); Zambia (ZNBC); Zanzibar (TVZ); Zimbabwe (ZBC)	Free-to-air: see list of countries Satellite (pay): **Supersport**	

== Radio ==
Country	Broadcaster	Source
Albania	RTSH	
Argentina	Radio Nacional; Radio La Red	
Australia	SBS	
Bosnia and Herzegovina	BHRT	
Brazil	Bandeirantes; Super Tupi; BandNews FM; Rede Transamérica; Gaúcha; Guaíba; Sociedade da Bahia; Verdinha 810; Gazeta de Alagoas; Banda B Paiquerê; Brasil Sul; Rádio Globo; CBN; Inconfidência; Record; Clube de Pernambuco; Eldorado/ESPN; Clube do Pará; Itatiaia; Rádio 730; Rádio Jornal; Jovem Pan.	
Croatia	HRT	
Denmark	DR	
France	French: Radio Monte Carlo	
France	Portuguese: Radio Alfa	
Germany	ARD (20 matches)	
India	All India Radio (Matches that feature Argentina, England, Germany and Brazil)	
Ireland	RTÉ	
Israel	Kol Yisrael (48 matches)	
Italy	RAI, RTL 102.5	
Mexico	Televisa Radio	
Panama	RPC	
Portugal	RTP	
Slovenia	Radio Slovenia	
Spain	Cadena SER	
Sweden	SR	
United Kingdom (England, Scotland, Northern Ireland, Wales)	BBC, Talksport	
United States	English: ESPN	
United States	Spanish: Fútbol de Primera	

== Internet ==
Country	Broadcaster	Link
Argentina	Canal 7	
Australia	SBS	https://web.archive.org/web/20100628111835/http://theworldgame.sbs.com.au/flash/
Belgium	Sporza	
Brazil	Rede Globo	
Bulgaria	BNT	https://web.archive.org/web/20100613013543/http://svetovno.bnt.bg/
Canada	CBC, Rogers	
Denmark	TV2	
Hungary	Index.hu	https://web.archive.org/web/20100612093144/http://sportgeza.hu/futball/2010/vb/elo/
Ireland	RTÉ	
Israel	IBA (48 matches), Reshet (9 matches)	
Mexico and Latin America (except Brazil and Argentina)	Televisa	
Poland	TVP	http://sport.tvp.pl
Portugal	RTP	http://www.rtp.pt
Romania	TVR	
Serbia	RTS	http://rts.rs
Slovenia	RTV Slovenija	http://tvslo.si
Sweden	SVT	http://svtplay.se
United Kingdom (England, Scotland, Northern Ireland, Wales)	BBC, ITV	https://www.bbc.co.uk/sport/football/womens-world-cup,
United States	English, Arabic, German, Korean and Portuguese: ESPN	http://www.espn3.com
United States	Spanish: Univision	https://wayback.archive-it.org/all/20110427101420/http://futbol.univision.com/

== Mobile and Cellular Services/Broadcasting ==
Country	Broadcaster	Source
Argentina	Canal 7	
Australia	SBS / Optus	
Brazil	Rede Globo, Rede Bandeirantes	
Canada	CBC, Rogers	
Indonesia	Telkomsel	
Israel	Sport 5	
Malaysia	Maxis	
Portugal	RTP, Vodafone, TMN	
Slovenia	RTV Slovenija, Mobitel	
United States	ESPN	
United Kingdom	BBC	
