= Minority language broadcasting =

Minority language broadcasting comprises radio and television programmes for both national (including indigenous) and foreign minorities in their respective languages.

Under treaties like the European Charter for Regional or Minority Languages (Art. 11 and 7(1)d) states are obliged to encourage broadcasting in national minorities' languages.

== Examples ==
Country	Broadcaster	Languages	Website
Australia	Special Broadcasting Service	See SBS Radio § Languages	SBS
Australia	Yolŋu Radio	Yolŋu	Yolŋu Radio
Austria	ORF Kärnten, Steiermark; R. Agora	Slovene	ORF, Radio Agora
Austria	ORF Burgenland, Wien	Croatian, Hungarian, Czech, Slovak, Romani	ORF
Canada	CFYK Yellowknife	Chipewyan, Dogrib, South Slavey	CBC North
Canada	CHAK Inuvik	Gwich’in, Inuvialuktun, North Slavey	CBC North
Canada	CFFB Nunavut	Inuktitut	CBC North
Canada	CBFG Chisasibi	Cree	CBC North
China (see also Ethnic broadcasting in China)	CNR	Kazakh, Korean, Mongolian, Tibetan, Uyghur	radio.cn
China (see also Ethnic broadcasting in China)	NMTV	Mongolian ᠮᠣᠨᠭᠭᠣᠯ	nmtv.cn
China (see also Ethnic broadcasting in China)	XJBS/XJTV	Uyghur (ئۇيغۇرچە), Kazakh (قازاقشا), Kyrgyz (قىرعىزچا), Mongolian, Tibetan	xjbs.com.cn, xjtvs.com.cn
China (see also Ethnic broadcasting in China)	Voice of Tibet	Tibetan (བོད་)	vtibet.com
China (see also Ethnic broadcasting in China)	YNR	Tai Lü, Tai Nüa, Jingpo, Lahu, Lisu	ynradio.com
China (see also Ethnic broadcasting in China)	YBTV	Korean (조선어)	iybtv.com
Germany	MDR/RBB	Sorbian	MDR, RBB
Germany	WDR Cosmo	Arabic, Greek, Italian, Kurdish, Polish, Russian, Serbo-Croatian, Spanish, Turkish	WDR
Hungary	Nemzetiségi	Armenian, Bulgarian, Croatian, German, Greek, Polish, Romani, Romanian, Rusyn, Serbian, Slovak, Slovene, Ukrainian	mediaklikk.hu
India (non-scheduled languages)	AIR Jaipur	Rajasthani (राजस्थानी)	newsonair.com
India (non-scheduled languages)	AIR Gorakhpur	Bhojpuri (भोजपुरी)	newsonair.com
India (non-scheduled languages)	AIR Srinagar	Pahari (पहाड़ी)	newsonair.com
India (non-scheduled languages)	AIR Jammu	Gojri (گوجری)	newsonair.com
India (non-scheduled languages)	AIR Leh	Ladakhi (ལ་དྭགས་)	newsonair.com
India (non-scheduled languages)	AIR Raipur	Chhattisgarhi (छत्तीसगढ़ी)	newsonair.com
India (non-scheduled languages)	AIR Sambalpur	Sambalpuri (ସମ୍ବଲପୁରୀ)	newsonair.com
India (non-scheduled languages)	AIR Gangtok	Bhutia (འབྲས་ལྗོངས་), Lepcha (ᰛᰩᰵ)	newsonair.com
India (non-scheduled languages)	AIR Guwahati	Karbi	newsonair.com
India (non-scheduled languages)	AIR Shillong	Khasi (খাশি)	newsonair.com
India (non-scheduled languages)	AIR Kohima	Nagamese	newsonair.com
India (non-scheduled languages)	AIR Agartala	Kokborok (ককবরক)	newsonair.com
India (non-scheduled languages)	AIR Aizawl	Mizo	newsonair.com
Israel	IPBC Makan 33	Arabic	Makan
Israel	IPBC Reka	English, French, Yiddish, Ladino, Spanish, Russian, Georgian, Bukhori, Amharic (Formerly also Judeo-Moroccan, Romanian, Hungarian, Persian, Tigrinya, Aramaic)	Reka
Israel	IPBC VoisFarsi	Persian	VoisFarsi
Italy	Radio Onde Furlane	Friulian	https://radioondefurlane.eu/
Netherlands	Omrop Fryslân	West Frisian	Omrop Fryslân
Russia	GTRK Karelia	Finnish, Karelian, Veps	Viestit
Russia	GTRK Komi Gor	Komi	komigor.com
Russia	GTRK Mari El	Mari, Tatar	Этно ТВ
Russia	GTRK Mordovia	Erzya, Moksha	Национальное вещание
Russia	GTRK Udmurtia	Udmurt	Иворъёс
Russia	GTRK Buryatia	Buryat	bgtrk.ru
Russia	GTRK Kalmykia	Kalmyk	хальмг келн
Russia	GTRK Sakha	Yakut	gtrksakha.ru
Russia	GTRK Altai	Altai	
Russia	GTRK Khakassia	Khakas	Хабарлар
Russia	GTRK Tuva	Tuvan	Медээлер Тыва черде
Russia	GTRK Bashkortostan	Bashkir	Хәбәрҙәр
Russia	GTRK Tatarstan	Tatar	Яңалыклар
Russia	GTRK Chuvashia	Chuvash	Вести Чӑваш ен
Russia	GTRK Krym	Crimean Tatar	1tvcrimea.ru
Russia	GTRK Dagestan	Avar, Aghul, Chechen, Dargin, Lak, Lezgian, Rutul, Tabasaran, Tsakhur; Azerbaijani, Kumyk, Nogai; Tat	Национальное вещание
Russia	GTRK Kabardino-Balkaria	Kabardino-Cherkess; Karachay-Balkar	Жангылыкъла, ХъыбарыщIэхэр
Russia	GTRK Karachay-Cherkessia	Abaza, Kabardino-Cherkess; Karachay-Balkar, Nogai	Ахабарква, Къэхъукъащӏэхэр; Жангылыкъла, Сонъгы Хабарлар
Russia	GTRK Adygea	Adyghe	Къэбархэр
Russia	GTRK Ingushetia	Ingush	Хоамаш
Russia	GTRK Vainakh	Chechen	Хаамаш
Russia	GTRK Alania	Ossetian	Хабæрттæ
Sweden	SVT2	Finnish, Northern Sámi, Meänkieli, Romani, Yiddish	Om oss - SVT
Sweden	Sveriges Radio Finska	Finnish	Sveriges Radio Finska
United Kingdom	BBC Cymru Wales, S4C	Welsh	Radio Cymru, S4C
United Kingdom	BBC Scotland	Scottish Gaelic	Radio nan Gàidheal, BBC Alba
United Kingdom	BBC Radio Cornwall	Cornish	An Nowodhow
United Kingdom	Manx Radio	Manx Gaelic	Manx Radio
United Kingdom	BBC Radio Jersey	Jèrriais	La Lettre Jerriaise
Vietnam	Minority Languages Television Department, Vietnam Television	Hmong, Thai, Dao, Tay-Nung, Muong, San Chay, Bru-Van Kieu, Chinese, Ede, Ba Na, Gia Rai, M'Nong, K'Ho, Gie-Trieng, Xe Dang, Chu Ru, Raglai, Cham, Co Tu, H're, Stieng	VTV5
Vietnam	Voice of Vietnam Minority Service (VOV4)	Hmong, Dao, Thai, Co Tu, Ede, Jarai, Bahnar, Sedang, K'Ho, Mnong, Cham, Khmer	VOV4
