= CCTV-5 =

China Central Television sports channel

CCTV-5 体育
- Country: China
- Broadcast area: China; Macau
- Network: China Central Television
- Headquarters: China Central Television Headquarters, Beijing CBD, Beijing, China

Programming
- Picture format: 1080i HDTV (downscaled to 576i for the SDTV feed)

Ownership
- Owner: China Central Television
- Sister channels: CCTV-1; CCTV-2; CCTV-5+ CCTV-14; CCTV-16

History
- Launched: 1 January 1995; 31 years ago
- Replaced: CCTV Olympics
- Former names: CCTV Olympics during Summer or Winter Olympics

Links
- Website: CCTV-5

Availability

Terrestrial
- Digital TV (DTMB): Digital channel number varies by area
- Digital TV (Macau): Channel 79 (via TDM)

Streaming media
- CCTV program website: CCTV-5(only in China)

CCTV-5 (Chinese: 中国中央电视台体育频道), also known as the Sports Channel, part of the China Central Television family of networks, is the main sports broadcaster in the People's Republic of China. CCTV-5 began broadcasting on 1 January 1995. CCTV-5 now broadcasts 24 hours a day, 7 days a week.

Satellite distribution began on 30 November 1995 using the Apstar-2 satellite. On 17 December 2019, CCTV-5 launched on the terrestrial network in Macau. The launch was delayed several times due to unresolved rights problems.

== Current sports coverage ==
CCTV-5 has coverage of the following sports leagues, teams, and events:

Multi-sports games

- Asian Games
- Summer Olympic Games
- Summer Paralympic Games
- Winter Olympic Games
- Winter Paralympic Games

American football

- Canadian Football League
- IFAF Asia-Oceania Flag Football Championships
- IFAF Flag Football World Championships
- IFAF World Championship
- National Football League
- World University American Football Championship

Association football

- Chinese Football Association
  - Chinese Super League
  - Chinese FA Cup
  - Chinese FA Super Cup
  - China National Football Team
- FIFA World Cup
- FIFA U-20 World Cup
- FIFA U-17 World Cup
- FIFA Futsal World Cup
- FIFA Women's World Cup
- FIFA U-20 Women's World Cup
- FIFA U-17 Women's World Cup
- AFC Asian Cup
- AFC U-23 Championship
- AFC U-19 Championship
- AFC U-16 Championship
- UEFA Euro
- Premier League
- Bundesliga
- La Liga
- Toulon Tournament
- Copa Libertadores

Auto Racing

- Formula One

Badminton

- BWF World Championships
- Badminton Asia Confederation
- China Open
- China Masters
- Chinese Badminton Association
- All England Open Badminton Championships
- Sudirman Cup
- Uber & Thomas Cup

Basketball

- Chinese Basketball Association
- National Basketball Association
- FIBA Basketball World Cup

Boxing

- World Boxing Association
- World Boxing Council
- International Boxing Federation
- World Boxing Organization

Cycling

- Tour de France
- Tour of Qinghai Lake

Field Hockey

- Hockey World Cup
- Women's Hockey World Cup
- Women's FIH Hockey World League

Golf

- PGA Tour
- Ryder Cup

Handball

- IHF World Men's Handball Championship (CCTV5+)
- IHF World Women's Handball Championship (CCTV5+)

Ice Hockey

- National Hockey League (CCTV5+)
- Kontinental Hockey League (CCTV5+)
- Ice Hockey World Championships (CCTV5+)
- World Cup of Hockey (CCTV5+)
- Champions Hockey League (CCTV5+)

MMA

- Kunlun Fight MMA

Rugby Union

- Rugby World Cup (CCTV5+)
- Premiership Rugby (CCTV5+)

Snooker

- World Snooker Championship
- Shanghai Masters (snooker)
- China Open (snooker)
- UK Championship

Surfing

- America's Cup

Table Tennis

- World Table Tennis Championships
- Table Tennis World Cup
- ITTF World Tour
- Asian Table Tennis Championships
- China Table Tennis Super League

Tennis

- All four Grand Slam
  - Australian Open
  - French Open
  - Wimbledon Championships
  - US Open
- ATP World Tour Masters 1000
- ATP World Tour Finals
- China Open
- WTA Shenzhen Open
- WTA Wuhan Open

Volleyball

- FIVB Volleyball Men's World Championship
- FIVB Volleyball Men's World Cup
- FIVB Volleyball Women's World Championship
- FIVB Volleyball Women's World Cup
- FIVB Volleyball Men's Nations League
- FIVB Volleyball Women's Nations League
- FIVB Volleyball Women's Club World Championship
- Asian Men's Volleyball Championship
- Asian Women's Volleyball Championship
- AVC Cup for Men
- AVC Cup for Women
- Chinese Volleyball Super League

== Past coverage ==
- Asian Games
  - Beijing Television (Old)
    - Bangkok 1978 (simulcast of National Sports, broadcast via satellite)
  - CCTV-2
    - New Delhi 1982 (simulcast of DD Sports)
    - Seoul 1986 (simulcast of KBS Sports 4)
    - Beijing 1990 (simulcast of CCTV Asian Games)
    - Hiroshima 1994 (simulcast of NHK Educational TV)
  - CCTV-5
    - Bangkok 1998 (simulcast of National Sports)
    - Busan 2002 (simulcast of KBS Sports 4)
    - Doha 2006 (simulcast of Al Jazeera Sports 6)
    - Guangzhou 2010 (simulcast of GDTV Zhuhai Sports)
    - Incheon 2014 (simulcast of KBS Sports 4)
    - Jakarta 2018 (simulcast of Televisi Republik Indonesia)
    - Hangzhou 2022 (simulcast of CCTV-1, CCTV-5, CCTV-5+ and CCTV-News)
- Summer Olympic Games
  - Beijing Television (Old)
    - Montreal 1976 (simulcast of CBFT-DT, broadcast in PAL Color)
  - CCTV-2
    - Moscow 1980 (simulcast of CT-USSR, via satellite)
    - Los Angeles 1984 (simulcast of Olympics on NBC, first Olympic Games for the PRC)
    - Seoul 1988 (simulcast of KBS Sports 4)
    - Barcelona 1992 (simulcast of TVE)
  - CCTV-5
    - Atlanta 1996 (simulcast of Olympics on NBC)
  - Past Coverage As CCTV-Olympic (Name and logo changed)
    - Sydney 2000 (simulcast of C7 Sport)
    - Athens 2004 (simulcast of CCTV-1, CCTV-2, CCTV-5 and CCTV-News)
    - Beijing 2008 (simulcast of CCTV-1, CCTV-2, CCTV-3, CCTV-5, CCTV-7, CCTV-12, CCTV-News and CCTV-HD)
    - London 2012 (simulcast of CCTV-1, CCTV-5, CCTV-7, CCTV-News and CCTV-HD)
    - Rio 2016 (simulcast of CCTV-1, CCTV-5, CCTV-5+ and CCTV-News)
    - Tokyo 2020 (simulcast of CCTV-1, CCTV-5, CCTV-5+ and CCTV-News)
    - Paris 2024 (simulcast of CCTV-1, CCTV-5, CCTV-5+ and CCTV-News)
- Winter Olympic Games
  - Beijing Television (Old)
    - Innsbruck 1976 (simulcast of FS1, first color broadcast)
    - Lake Placid 1980 (simulcast of Olympics on ABC)
  - CCTV-2
    - Sarajevo 1984 (simulcast of JRT)
    - Calgary 1988 (simulcast of CFCN-DT)
    - Albertville 1992 (simulcast on TF1, Antenne 2 and FR3)
    - Lillehammer 1994 (simulcast of NRK)
  - CCTV-5
    - Nagano 1998 (simulcast of NHK, NTV, TBS, Fuji TV, TV Asahi and TV Tokyo)
    - Salt Lake City 2002 (simulcast of Olympics on NBC)
    - Torino 2006 (simulcast of CCTV-1, CCTV-2, CCTV-5 and CCTV-News)
    - Vancouver 2010 (simulcast of CCTV-1, CCTV-5, CCTV-7, CCTV-News and CCTV-HD)
    - Sochi 2014 (simulcast of CCTV-1, CCTV-5, CCTV-5+ and CCTV-News)
    - Pyeongchang 2018 (simulcast of CCTV-1, CCTV-5, CCTV-5+ and CCTV-News)
    - Beijing 2022 (simulcast of CCTV-1, CCTV-5, CCTV-5+ and CCTV-News)
    - Milan-Cortina d'Ampezzo 2026 (simulcast of CCTV-1, CCTV-5, CCTV-5+ and CCTV-News)

== Past coverage as CCTV-FIFA World Cup ==
- FIFA World Cup
  - CCTV-2
    - Spain 1982 (all matches live on CCTV-1)
    - Mexico 1986 (all matches live on CCTV-1)
    - Italy 1990 (all matches live on CCTV-1)
    - United States 1994 (all matches live on CCTV-1 and CCTV-2)
  - CCTV-5
    - France 1998 (all matches live on CCTV-1, CCTV-2 and CCTV-7)
    - Korea & Japan 2002 (all matches live on CCTV-1, CCTV-2 and CCTV-7)
    - Germany 2006 (all matches live on CCTV-1, CCTV-2 and CCTV-7)
    - South Africa 2010 (all matches live on CCTV-1, CCTV-2 and CCTV-7)
    - Brazil 2014 (all matches live on CCTV-1, CCTV-2, CCTV-7, CCTV-13 and CCTV-22)
    - Russia 2018 (all matches live on CCTV-1, CCTV-2, CCTV-7, CCTV-13 and CCTV-22)
    - Qatar 2022 (all matches live on CCTV-1, CCTV-2, CCTV-7, CCTV-13 and CCTV-22)

== Past coverage as CCTV-UEFA Euro ==
- UEFA European Championship
  - CCTV-1
    - West Germany 1988 (all matches live on CCTV-1)
    - Sweden 1992 (all matches live on CCTV-1)
    - England 1996 (all matches live on CCTV-1, CCTV-2 and CCTV-7)
    - Belgium/Netherlands 2000 (all matches live on CCTV-1, CCTV-2 and CCTV-7)
    - Portugal 2004 (all matches live on CCTV-1, CCTV-2, CCTV-7 and CCTV-13)
    - Austria/Switzerland 2008 (all matches live on CCTV-1, CCTV-2, CCTV-7, CCTV-13 and CCTV-HD)
    - Poland/Ukraine 2012 (all matches live on CCTV-1, CCTV-2, CCTV-7, CCTV-13 and CCTV-22)
    - France 2016 (all matches live on CCTV-1, CCTV-2, CCTV-7, CCTV-13 and CCTV-22)
    - Europe 2020 (all matches live on CCTV-1, CCTV-2, CCTV-7, CCTV-13 and CCTV-22)
    - Germany 2024 (all matches live on CCTV-1, CCTV-2, CCTV-7, CCTV-13 and CCTV-22)

== Programmes ==
- Who is the [Dance] King? [谁是舞王]
- Sports News [体育咖吧]
- Wushu Masters [武林大会]
- Chinese Longzhou Tournament [中华龙舟大赛]
- Who is the [Football] King? [谁是球王]

== See also ==
- Beijing Tiyu Guangbo - Beijing Sports Radio
