= XMG =

XMG may refer to:

- Crossmaglen a British Military abbreviation for the village
- Xiamen Media Group, television and radio broadcasting network
- XMG Studio, mobile games developer
