= NXTV =

NXTV may refer to:

- Ningxia Television, a Chinese TV station
- NextRadioTV, a French Radio and TV station
