= CCTV-5+ =

Chinese sports television channel

CCTV-5+ 体育赛事
- Country: China
- Broadcast area: Mainland China
- Headquarters: Beijing, China

Programming
- Language: Chinese language
- Picture format: 1080i HDTV

Ownership
- Owner: China Central Television
- Sister channels: CCTV-1; CCTV-5; CCTV-14; CCTV-16

History
- Launched: 1 May 2008
- Former names: CCTV-HD (until 15 August 2013)

Links
- Website: http://cctv5plus.cntv.cn/

Availability

Terrestrial
- Digital TV (DTMB): Digital channel number varies by area

Streaming media
- CCTV program website: Live online

CCTV-5+ (Chinese: 中国中央电视台体育赛事频道), formerly CCTV-HD, is China Central Television's channel designated to broadcast top international sporting events in high-definition. It was tested in Beijing on 24 December 2007, and launched officially on 1 May 2008 as CCTV-HD. CCTV-HD was created specifically for the 2008 Summer Olympics and 2008 Summer Paralympics.

Due to there having been several more HD CCTV broadcast channels in China, CCTV changed the channel name to "CCTV-5+" on 16 August 2013. It's the second sports channel of the CCTV network.

This channel was previously only available for selected cable/satellite providers, but is now widely available.
