= Ying Zhu =

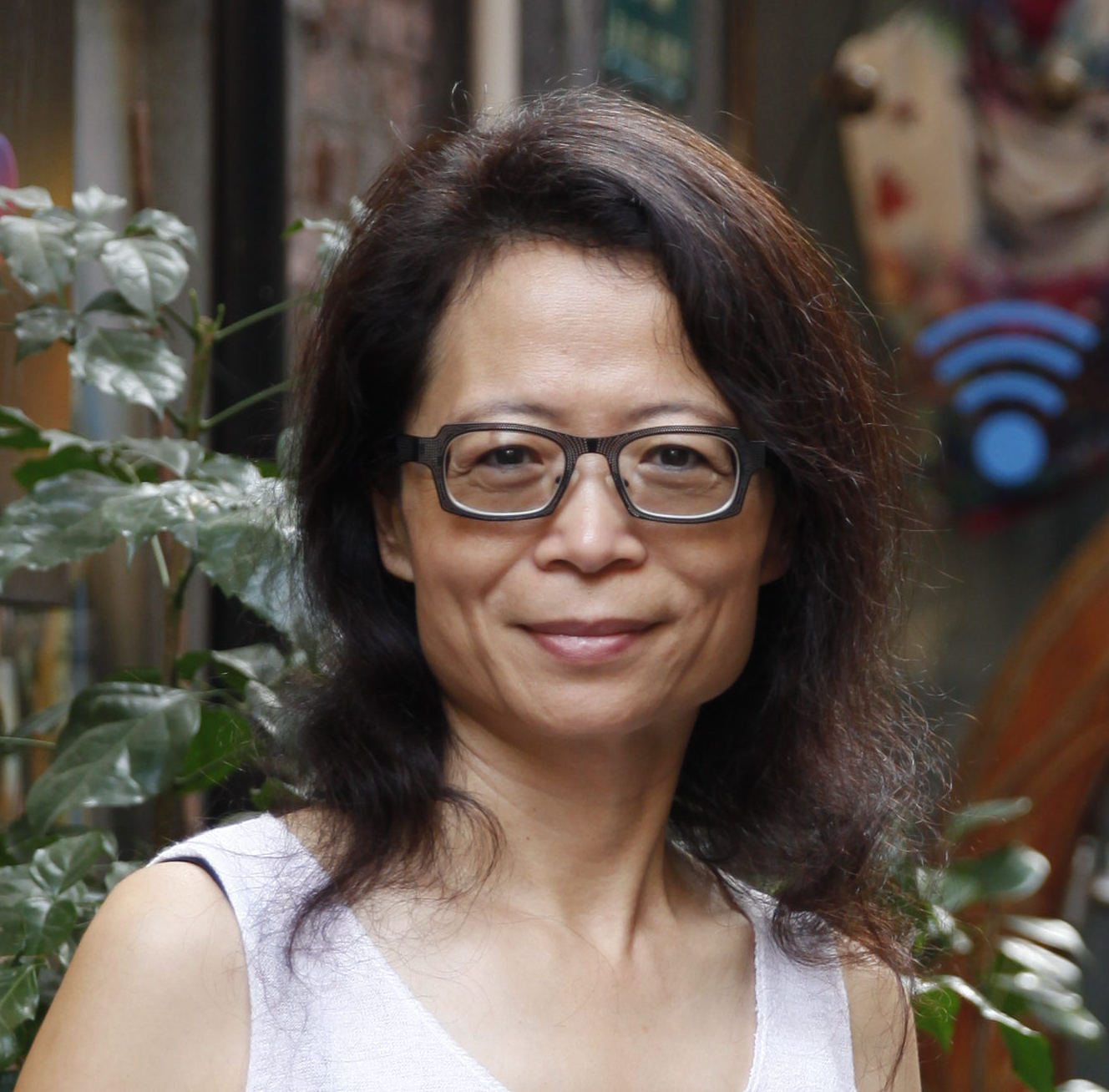
Ying Zhu

Ying Zhu is a professor in the Academy of Film at Hong Kong Baptist University and a professor emeritus at the College of Staten Island of the City University of New York.

== Career ==
Zhu's research areas encompass Chinese cinema and media, Sino-Hollywood relations, and streaming media and serial narrative. She has published four research monographs including "Hollywood in China", and Two Billion Eyes: The Story of China Central Television (2014), and six co-edited books including Soft Power with Chinese Characteristics: China's Campaign for Hearts and Minds (Coedited with Stanley Rosen and Kingsley Edney), with a foreword by Joseph Nye. Her first research monograph was Chinese Cinema During the Era of Reform: The Ingenuity of the System (2003). Her second research monograph, Television in Post-Reform China: Serial Drama, Confucian Leadership and the Global Television Market (2008), together with three co-edited books—TV China (2009), TV Drama in China (2008), and Television Dramas: The US and Chinese Perspectives(2005) addressed the subfield of Chinese TV drama studies in the West.

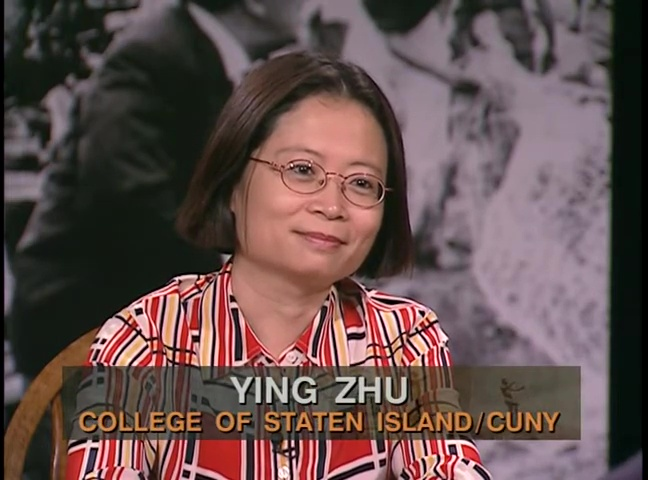
Zhu on CUNY TV's City Cinematheque, 2005

Zhu has produced current affairs documentary films, including Google vs. China (2011) and China: From Cartier to Confucius (2012), both screened on the Netherlands Public Television.

Zhu is founder and editor in chief of Global Storytelling, an international and interdisciplinary forum for intellectual debates concerning the politics, economics, culture, media, and technology of the moving image.

== Awards ==
Zhu received a 2006 National Endowment for the Humanities Fellowship, a 2008 American Council of Learned Societies Fellowship, and a 2017 Fulbright Senior Research Fellowship.

== See also ==
- Cinema of China
- Television in the People's Republic of China
