= Dragon Tower =

- 龙塔
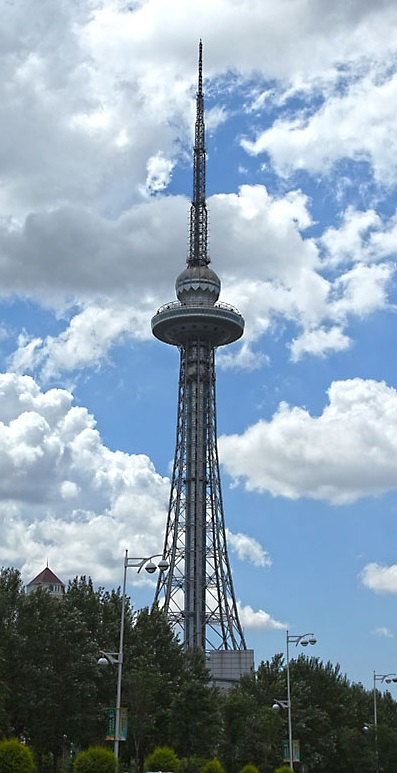

- Location within China
- Alternative names: Long Ta; Heilongjiang Tower

General information
- Status: Completed
- Type: Steel lattice television and observation tower
- Location: Harbin, Heilongjiang, China
- Coordinates: 45°44′45.55″N 126°40′28″E
- Construction started: 1999
- Completed: 2000

Height
- Antenna spire: 335.89 m (1,102 ft)
- Top floor: 216.10 m (709 ft)

Dragon Tower, also known as Long Ta (Chinese: 龙塔; pinyin: lóng tǎ) or Heilongjiang Tower (Chinese: 黑龙江塔), is a 336 m (1,102 ft) tall multi-purpose Chinese steel lattice television and observation tower. The Long Ta is used for television broadcasting; telecommunication, transmitting FM-/TV-broadcasting throughout the province of Heilongjiang; for observation, providing a view of the surrounding areas of city. The tower has observation decks and buffet restaurants. It has a AAAA rating.

Dragon Tower is 336 m (1,102 ft) and is the fourth tallest freestanding lattice tower in the world, the second tallest in Asia, and tallest in China. The tower has an antenna at 335.89 m (1,102 ft) and a top floor at 216.10 m (709 ft).

== See also ==
- Lattice tower
- List of tallest towers in the world
- List of tallest freestanding structures in the world
- List of tallest freestanding steel structures
- Heilongjiang Television, Dragon Scenery, the television station group that is in this tower
- Long Guang, Dragon Broadcast, the radio station group that is in this tower
- Harbin
- Heilongjiang
