= Xinjiang Production and Construction Corps Radio and Television =

Satellite television station in Xinjiang, China

- Type: Broadcast
- Country: People's Republic of China
- Broadcast area: Xinjiang
- Parent: Xinjiang Production and Construction Corps
- Launch date: 19 July 1994 (officially)
- Television channel: Bingtuan Satellite Television
- Online service: Bingtuan Online
- Official website: www.btzx.com.cn
- Replaced: Xinjiang Production and Construction Corps Television Recording Centre

Xinjiang Production and Construction Corps Radio and Television (Chinese: 新疆生产建设兵团广播电视台) is a provincial satellite television station in Xinjiang, China, administered by the Xinjiang Production and Construction Corps (Bingtuan). It runs a television channel called Bingtuan Satellite Television (兵团卫视), which started its 24-hour satellite broadcasting through Sinosat-3 on 7 October 2007.

== History ==
Xinjiang Production and Construction Corps Radio and Television was preceded by Xinjiang Production and Construction Corps Television Recording Centre (新疆生产建设兵团电视录制中心), which was established in early 1985. The Xinjiang Production and Construction Corps began constructing a cable television station in 1993, with a test broadcast in May. The General Office of the Xinjiang Production and Construction Corps approved the establishment of Xinjiang Production and Construction Corps Radio and Television on 25 March 1994. The Ministry of Radio, Film and Television of the People's Republic of China gave its approval on 19 July 1994.

== Programs ==
Its service covers 12 of Xinjiang's 14 prefectures, as well as the regional capital of Ürümqi. On 1 July 2008, Bingtuan Satellite Television was overhauled with a new focus on music programs, in an effort to become the top youth music channel in China. However, after the July 2009 Ürümqi riots, the State Administration of Radio, Film, and Television demanded that Bingtuan Satellite Television rectify its content. As a result, only a few programs, such as Bingtuan News and some soap operas, were kept. The channel also began routinely rebroadcasting CCTV-1, the primary channel of China Central Television, and cancelled several of its previously planned entertainment shows, which would have been produced in partnership with a production company in Beijing.
