= Inner Mongolia Radio Broadcasting Network =

Chinese radio network

The Inner Mongolia Radio Broadcasting Network (Chinese: 内蒙古广播网; pinyin: Nèiménggǔ Guǎngbò Wǎng; Mongolian: ᠥᠪᠦᠷ ᠮᠣᠩᠭᠣᠯ ᠤᠨ ᠷᠠᠳᠢᠣ᠋ ᠰᠦᠯᠵᠢᠶ᠎ᠡ) was a radio broadcasting network headquartered in Hohhot, Inner Mongolia Autonomous Region of the People's Republic of China. It was founded in 1950 as Inner Mongolia People's Broadcasting Station (Chinese: 内蒙古人民广播电台). In June 2016 it merged with NMTV.

== List of programmes ==
Inner Mongolia Radio Stations
Programme	Description
蒙古语广播FM95.9/AM1458	Mongolian programme
草原之声FM105	Sound of the Grassland
新闻广播FM95	News
新闻综合FM89/AM675	General News
交通之声FM105.6	Traffic
经济生活FM101.4	Economy
音乐之声FM93.6	Music
评书曲艺FM102.8	Story Radio
FM91.9农村牧区	Agriculture
