= CCTV-16 =

Chinese television channel

- CCTV Olympics logo
- Country: China
- Broadcast area: Mainland China
- Headquarters: Beijing

Programming
- Language: Mandarin
- Picture format: 2160p UHDTV (downscaled to 1080i for the HDTV feed)

Ownership
- Owner: China Central Television (China Media Group)
- Sister channels: CCTV-5; CCTV-5+

History
- Launched: August 23, 2000
- Former names: CCTV Olympics (2000–2021)

Links
- Website: CCTV-16

CCTV-16 is a Chinese free-to-air television channel, owned by China Central Television. The channel is a localised version of the Olympic Channel, broadcasting primarily in 4K UHD format, with a downscaled feed for HDTV.

== History and programming ==
In January 2019, Voice of China announced plans to launch a Chinese version of the Olympic Channel. The channel later launched on 25 October 2021, prior to the 2022 Winter Olympics. Like its numerous localisations, the Chinese version of the Olympic Channel airs both live and classic sports events, along with original programming.
