= CCTV-17 =

Chinese television channel

- Country: China
- Broadcast area: Worldwide
- Headquarters: Beijing

Programming
- Language(s): Mandarin
- Picture format: 1080i HDTV (downscaled to 16:9 576i for the SDTV feed)

History
- Launched: August 1, 2019 (trial); September 23, 2019 (formal launch)

Links
- Website: CCTV-17

Availability

Terrestrial
- Digital TV (DTMB): Digital channel number varies by area

Streaming media
- CCTV program website: CCTV-17

CCTV-17 (Chinese: 中国中央电视台农业农村频道, China Central Television Agriculture and Village Channel) is a Chinese free-to-air television channel, owned by China Central Television. It handles the agricultural programmes moved from CCTV-7 after the revamp of the latter channel. This is a state-run TV channel.

Trial broadcasts of the channel commenced on 1 August 2019, with a launch date of 23 September, as part of celebrations for the Chinese Farmers' Harvest Festival.

== Programmes ==
- Jujiao Sannong (聚焦三农, lit "Agricultural Watch")
- Zhi Fu Jing (致富经, lit "Agribusiness Today")
- Keji Lian (科技链, lit "Agritech Connect")
- The Big Stage of Village (乡村大舞台)
- Xiang Yue (乡约, lit "Dating in the Countryside")
- Repeats of TV series under Rural Theatre strand
- Heroes Everywhere (遍地英雄)
