= CCTV-12 =

Chinese television channel

CCTV-12 社会与法
- Country: China
- Broadcast area: Worldwide

Programming
- Picture format: 1080i HDTV (downscaled to 576i for the SD feed)

Ownership
- Owner: China Central Television

History
- Launched: 12 May 2002
- Former names: China Central Television Western Channel (2002 - 2004)

Links
- Website: CCTV-12

Availability

Terrestrial
- Digital TV (DTMB): Digital channel number varies by area

Streaming media
- CCTV program website: CCTV-12

CCTV-12 Law and Society is a channel of the China Central Television in China.
