= Long Guang =

Radio station in Harbin, China

Harbin; China
- Broadcast area: Heilongjiang
- Frequency: (see below)
- Branding: Long Guang

Programming
- Format: various formats

Ownership
- Owner: Heilongjiang Renmin Guangbo Dian Tai

History
- Call sign meaning: The character "龙" (long) looks like "H" for Heilongjiang

Links
- Website: http://www.hljradio.com/

Long Guang (Chinese: 龙广; pinyin: Lóngguǎng), which stands for Dragon Broadcast, is the radio station group that was once the Harbin Renmin Guangbo Diantai (simplified Chinese: 黑龙江人民广播电台; pinyin: Hēilóngjiāng Rénmín Guǎngbō Diàntái; Korean: 흑룡강인민방송), translated as Heilongjiang People's Broadcasting Station, which consists of several radio stations broadcasting from Harbin and the greater Heilongjiang Province area. (Evidence of Harbin Ren Min Guangbo Dian Tai is in the BBS of this radio station.)

== Online at Long Guang Zai Xian Wang ==
The radio station represented by the Harbin Ren Min Guangbo Dian Tai is called Long Guang Zai Xian Wang (Chinese: 龙广在线网; pinyin: Lóngguǎng Zàixiàn Wǎng). In Chinese, "zai xian" stands for "online". The website contains information about the terrestrial radio stations in Harbin and a bulletin board for listener feedback. It is associated with Long Bei Jing through the Heilongjiang Radio & TV Group. The facilities are located in Heilongjiang Television and Radio Broadcast Center in the Long Ta (Dragon Tower).

== Long Guang Xinwen Wang - News Radio ==
Long Guang Xinwen Wang (Chinese: 龙广新闻网; pinyin: Lóngguǎng Xīnwén Wǎng) is the news broadcast of the Harbin Ren Min Guangbo Dian Tai group, which broadcasts at 94.6 FM and 621 AM.

== List of Harbin Radio Stations ==
Harbin Stations
Frequency	Description
94.6 FM and 621 AM	Long Guang Xinwen Wang - News Radio (link: https://web.archive.org/web/20080126093603/http://am621.hljradio.com/)
99.8 FM	Long Guang Jiaotong Guangbo - Traffic Radio ()
104.5 FM	Long Guang Shenghuo Guangbo - Life Radio (link: )
102.1 FM	Long Guang Du Shi Nu Xing - Metro Women's Radio (link: )
95.8 FM	Long Guang Yinyue Guangbo - Music Radio (link: )
97.0 FM	Long Guang Jiu Qi Ping Dao - Channel 97 (link: )
873 AM	Long Guang Chao Yu Guangbo - Korean Language Broadcast/흑룡강조선어방송국 (link: https://web.archive.org/web/20150810213621/http://www.873k.com/)

Long Guang also operates a station in Sanya in Hainan, Sanya Diantai Tianya zhi Sheng (Sanya Radio, Voice of Tianya; also known as "Sunny Radio"), on 104.6 FM (link: https://web.archive.org/web/20090527170402/http://www.hljradio.com/ty/).
