= CCTV-2 =

Chinese television channel

- Country: China
- Broadcast area: Worldwide

Programming
- Picture format: 1080i HDTV (downscaled to 576i for the SDTV feed)

Ownership
- Owner: China Central Television

History
- Launched: May 1, 1973
- Former names: Peking Television Channel 2 (1973–1978); China Central Television Program 2 (1978–1992); China Central Television Economic and Comprehension Channel (1993–2000); China Central Television Economic, Life and Service Channel (2000–2003); China Central Television Economy Channel (2003–2009); China Central Television Business Channel (2009–present)

Links
- Website: cctv2.cntv.cn

Availability

Terrestrial
- Digital TV (DTMB): Digital channel number varies by area.

Streaming media
- CCTV program website: CCTV-2

CCTV-2 is a Chinese free-to-air television channel operated by China Central Television in the People's Republic of China. The channel broadcasts programs on business news, economic information, stock market data, business, industry, economic documentaries, and life services.

== History ==
CCTV-2 was launched in 1973 as China's first color TV network and broadcast primarily economic programs. The station broadcasts on VHF channel 8 in Beijing.

In 1983, CCTV-2 shifted its programming to broadcast sports events, agricultural programs, variety shows, and reruns of CCTV-1 productions. It also aired TV series from other countries. As of 1994, it was receivable in 47% of Guangzhou. In late November 1996, it started carrying selected programs from CNBC Asia. The channel also carried CBA matches, alongside CCTV-5.

In 2000, the channel was rebranded as "CCTV Economic Life and Service Channel".

On 24 August 2009, CCTV2 was rebranded again as "CCTV Business Channel". Television programs not related to finance, economics, or life services were moved to CCTV-3 and CCTV-10.

== Content ==
Programs broadcast on CCTV-2 are mainly about:

- Energy conservation
- Stock exchange
- Scams (Buyer Beware)
- Finance and consumer-related game shows

== Programmes ==
- Dialogue
- Secret Homage to Hero
- Geeker Go
- We Are Young
- Is It True?
- Shi Zhan Shang Xue Yuan
