= Ningxia Television =

Chinese TV station

Ningxia Television (NXTV)
- Industry: Television Broadcasting
- Founded: October 1, 1970
- Headquarters: Yinchuan, Ningxia, China
- Products: Television content, Television programming
- Website: nxtv.cn

Ningxia Television or NXTV is a television station located in Ningxia, China. The station was founded on October 1, 1970 and began broadcasting on January 1, 1971.

== Channels ==
- Ningxia Television 1 (Economic Channel)
- Ningxia Satellite Channel
- Ningxia Television 3 (Public Channel)
- Ningxia Television 4 (Movie & Programming Channel)
- Ningxia Television 5 (Children's Channel)
- Ningxia Television 6 (Home Shopping Channel)

== See also ==
- List of Chinese-language television channels
- Television in the People's Republic of China
