= Yanbian Television =

Chinese Korean-language satellite TV channel

- Country: China
- Headquarters: Yanbian Korean Autonomous Prefecture, Jilin Province, China

Programming
- Languages: Chinese Korean (YBTV-1), Mandarin (YBTV-2)
- Picture format: 1080i (HDTV) 16:9 (since 2016)

Ownership
- Owner: Jilin TV (2011-–present); Yanbian BRT (2006–2011)
- Sister channels: Yanbian TV News

History
- Launched: December 31, 1977 (main); August 10, 2006 (satellite)

Links
- Website: Official website Official video website

Yanbian Television
- Traditional Chinese: 延邊衛視
- Simplified Chinese: 延边卫视
Transcriptions
Standard Mandarin
- Hanyu Pinyin: Yánbiān Wèishì

Chinese Korean name
- Chosŏn'gŭl: 연변위성방송
- Hancha: 延邊衛星放送
Transcriptions
- Revised Romanization: Yeonbyeon Wiseong Bangsong
- McCune–Reischauer: Yŏnbyŏn Wisŏng Pangsong

South Korean name
- Hangul: 옌볜위성방송
- Hanja: 옌볜衛星放送
Transcriptions
- Revised Romanization: Yenbyen Wiseong Bangsong
- McCune–Reischauer: Yenbyen Wisŏng Pangsong

Yanbian Television or YBTV (Note: simplified Chinese: 延边卫视; traditional Chinese: 延邊衛視; pinyin: Yánbiān Wèishì; Korean: 연변위성방송; MR: Yŏnbyŏn Wisŏng Bangsong) is China's only Korean-language satellite TV channel. It is also a satellite channel of the Yanbian Radio and Television Broadcasting Corporation. It was officially launched on December 31, 1977, while relaunching for satellite broadcasting on August 10, 2006.

== History ==
On December 31, 1977, Yanbian Television was launched as Yanji Television Broadcasting. (Note: simplified Chinese: 延吉电视台; traditional Chinese: 延吉電視台; pinyin: Yánjì Diànshìtái; Korean: 연길텔레비죤방송국; MR: Yŏngil Tellebijyon Bangsong-gug) It only broadcast in black-and-white until the early 1980's.

On August 10, 2006, Yanbian Satellite Television was formally launched, becoming China's first regional satellite television. Through Chinasat 6A and 9A, the coverage of the channel included China's Northeastern provinces and Shandong Peninsula, Beijing, Tianjin, and other ethnic Korean populated areas of China. Coverage also extended across countries in Asia, Europe and Oceania.

The actual implementation of Yanbian TV would be divided into three stages: the first stage was to complete effective coverage within China, the second stage to achieve coverage of the Korean-inhabited areas of Liaoning, Heilongjiang, and Inner Mongolia, and the third stage was to extend the coverage to the Southeast coastal areas of China where ethnic Korean groups live, and large cities such as Beijing and Shanghai.

Yanbian TV is the first domestic TV station to start from an autonomous prefecture. It has a unique significance to publicize Yanbian, and to allow outsiders to know and understand the region. At present, Yanbian TV has been broadcast on TV networks in more than 100 counties and in 25 regions across China. The viewership coverage has exceeded 100 million.

=== Advertising violations ===
On several occasions in November and December 2018, Yanbian TV faced multiple advertising violations, due to the channel broadcasting shopping and medical commercials overtime. The National Radio and Television Administration repeatedly instructed the Provincial Bureau of Jilin to urge Yanbian TV to rectify the issues. However, the channel's advertising violations have not been rectified in place and they have repeatedly continued to re-broadcast.

As a result, the National Radio and Television Administration ordered the Bureau of Radio and Television of Jilin Province to give Yanbian TV an administrative penalty by suspending the broadcast of commercial advertisements for 30 days.

== Programs ==
Program	Korean	Chinese	Description
Yanbian News	연변뉴스	延边新闻	Korean news program
CCTV News Network	국내외뉴스	中央电视台新闻联播	News broadcast with Korean dubbing
World Today	지구촌뉴스	今日世界	Korean news program
Look at Shenzhou	신주	看神州	Documentary program with Korean dubbing
Fishing	즐거운 낚시	钓鱼	Outsourced programs in Korean
Our Garden	우리네 동산	我们的花园	Korean children’s program
