= CCTV-14 =

Channel owned and operated by China Central Television

- Country: China
- Broadcast area: Worldwide

Programming
- Picture format: 1080i HDTV (downscaled to 16:9 576i for the SDTV feed)

Ownership
- Owner: China Central Television

History
- Launched: 28 December 2003
- Replaced: CCTV-7
- Former names: CCTV-Children

Links
- Website: CCTV-14

Availability

Terrestrial
- Digital TV (DTMB): Digital channel number varies by area.
- Cable TV (Hong Kong): Channel 14 (SD); Channel 514 (HD)

Streaming media
- CCTV program website: CCTV-14

CCTV-14 is a Chinese free-to-air television channel that was launched on 28 December 2003 and is owned by the China Central Television. It airs animated films and series as well as kids game shows and other young-oriented programmes.

Before its launch, CCTV children's programs were broadcast on CCTV-7.

== History ==
Test transmissions of the channel were started on 8 December 2003. Its first broadcast was made on 10 December 2003 with a duration of 16 hours. The channel was made available on UHF channel 33 in the Beijing area; most of the other CCTV channels (except CCTV-1 and CCTV-2) were only available on cable and satellite television at the time. CCTV-14 was formally launched on 28 December 2003 as CCTV-Children and was split from CCTV-7. By 2005, it was received in an estimated 120 million homes and was carrying imported programming from Nickelodeon and was attracting an audience, following changes to SARFT leadership to enable easier deals with international production houses, in May 2005, the channel started carrying CatDog which attracted as many as 650,000 potential viewers in Beijing alone; on 28 December of that year, it began carrying SpongeBob SquarePants.

As of August 2006, when the government began enacting a ban on foreign-made animated series between 5 and 8pm taking effect from 1 September, most of its programming was produced in China; competing channels from local networks were more dependent on dubbed foreign programming, especially Korean, American and Japanese. On 1 January 2011, the channel was renamed to CCTV-14.

Since 2013, CCTV-14 has aired the CCTV New Year's Gala.

In August 2019, the channel produced an adapted version of The Selfish Giant, titled The Giants Garden, a live musical phenomenon with a cast of nearly 300 of Shanghai's top child actors. It was presented in English instead of Mandarin and broadcast to all of the People's Republic of China. The show was met with acclaim, and aided in installing a yearly tradition of the channel producing a musical to be broadcast entirely in English with original music.
