= Jilin Television =

Chinese television network

Jilin Television (JLTV)
- Type: Broadcast
- Country: People's Republic of China
- Official website: http://www.jilintv.com.cn/

Jilin Television (JLTV, Chinese: 吉林电视台; pinyin: Jílín Diànshìtái) is a television network covering the Changchun city and Jilin province area. It was founded and started to broadcast on October 1, 1959. JLTV currently broadcasts in Chinese, Manchu, and Korean.

== Channels ==
- Jilin Satellite Television
- City Channel
- Movie Channel
- Rural Channel
- Lifecycle Channel
- Public & News Channel
- Variety & Cultural Channel
- Jilin Jiayou Shopping Channel
- Northeast Opera Channel (pay channel)
- Changying Channel
- Yanbian Satellite Television

=== Former channels ===
- Basketball Channel (pay channel, stopped airing on January 25, 2022)
