= Heilongjiang Television Station =

Chinese television network

Heilongjiang Television (HLJTV)
- Logo used since 2001
- Type: Broadcast
- Country: China
- Official website: www.hljtv.com

Heilongjiang Television (HLJTV, simplified Chinese: 黑龙江电视台; traditional Chinese: 黑龍江電視台; pinyin: Hēilóngjiāng Diànshìtái) is a television network in the Heilongjiang province of China. The Heilongjiang Television and Radio Broadcast Center is located in the Long Ta (Dragon Tower). It is associated with Long Guang through the Heilongjiang Radio and TV Group. Its logo is both the English letter "H" and the Chinese character "龙", depending on how one looks at it.

== List of Heilongjiang Television channels ==
Heilongjiang TV Stations
Channel	Description
HLJTV-1 (黑龙江卫视)	General satellite channel
HLJTV-2 (影视频道)	Drama channel
HLJTV-3 (文体频道)	Literature, entertainment, and sports channel
HLJTV-4 (都市频道)	City's Charm channel
HLJTV-5 (新闻·法治频道)	News information, legal, and social channel
HLJTV-6 (公共·农业频道)	Public and agriculture channel
HLJTV-7 (少儿频道)	Children's channel
HLJTV-Metro (地铁传媒频道)	Mobile digital television, only available on Line 1
HLJTV-Mobile (移动传媒频道)	Mobile digital television, only available on Harbin buses
