= CCTV-7 =

Chinese free-to-air television channel

- Country: China
- Broadcast area: Worldwide
- Headquarters: CCTV Headquarters; East 3rd Ring Road off Guanghua Road; Chaoyang Metropolitan, Beijing Central Business District; Beijing

Programming
- Language: Chinese
- Picture format: 1080i HDTV (downscaled to 16:9 576i for the SDTV feed)

History
- Launched: 30 November 1995; 30 years ago 1 August 2019

Links
- Website: CCTV-7

Availability

Terrestrial
- Digital terrestrial television: Local carriage may vary

Streaming media
- CCTV program website: CCTV-7

CCTV-7 (Chinese: 中国中央电视台国防军事频道, China Central Television Defense and Military Channel), is a Chinese free-to-air television channel owned by China Central Television. The channel primarily carries programming devoted to the People's Liberation Army.

== History ==
At launch, the channel combined children's, military, agricultural and science programming.

In 2001, the channel was receivable by 640 million people. On 11 February 2002, the eve of Chinese New Year, the channel started airing the British series Teletubbies. The agreement with BBC Worldwide envisioned three airings a week.

CCTV-7 children's television series were moved to CCTV-14 in 2003. On 1 August 2019 (coinciding with the anniversary of the Army's establishment), the channel dropped its agriculture programmes, which moved to the new CCTV-17 channel from 23 September.

== Programming ==
- Xinwen Lianbo (simulcast with CCTV-1 and CCTV-13)
- Defense News on mornings and middays
- Military Report (军事报道)
- Defense Review (防务新观察)
- Military Technology (军事科技)
- Military Documentaries (军事纪实)
- Who's the Final Hero (谁是终极英雄)

=== Former programming ===
==== Agriculture (Moved CCTV-17) ====
- Yangguang Dadao (阳光大道, lit "Sunshine Boulevard")
- Meiri Nongjing (每日农经, lit "Agriculture Daily")
- Jujiao Sannong (聚焦三农, lit "Agricultural Watch")
- The Big World of Village (乡村大世界)
- Xiang Yue (乡约, lit "Dating in the Countryside")
