= Xiamen Media Group =

Chinese television and radio broadcasting network

- Country: People's Republic of China
- Founded: June 28, 2004
- Former names: Xiamen Television; People's Radio Station of Xiamen
- Official website: www.xmtv.cn/xmg/

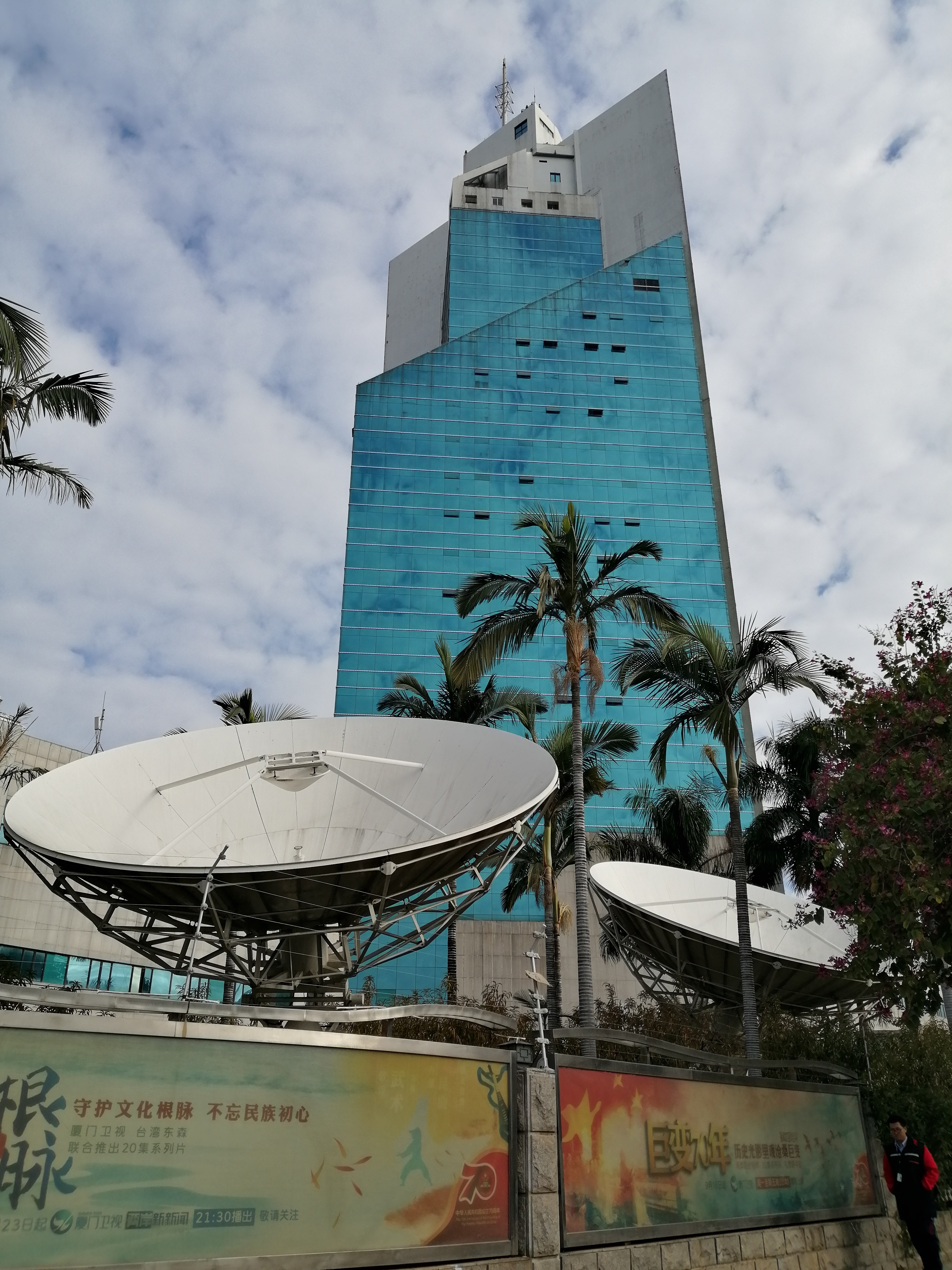
Headquarters of Xiamen Media Group

Xiamen Media Group (XMG; Chinese: 厦门广播电视集团; pinyin: Xiàmén guǎngbō diànshì jítuán; Pe̍h-ōe-jī: Ē-mn̂g-kóng-pò-tiān-sī-chïp-thôan) is a television and radio broadcasting network in Xiamen, China owned by local government. XMG is joined from former media entities in Xiamen, i.e. Xiamen Television and People's Radio Station of Xiamen.

Xiamen Television started broadcasting on VHF channel 4 on November 22, 1978; by the 1990s, it also operated a second channel on UHF channel 26.

== Television channels ==
- XMTV-1 (News Channel)
- XMTV-2 (Cross-Strait Channel)
- XMTV-3 (Life Channel)
- XMTV-4 (Drama & Movie Channel)
- Xiamen Star (Satellite Channel)
- Xiamen Mobile TV

== Radio broadcast frequencies ==
- News broadcast: FM99.6 MHz&AM1107kHz
- Music broadcast: FM90.9 MHz
- Min-nan-hua broadcast: FM101.2 MHz&AM801kHz
- Economy and traffic broadcast: FM107MHz&AM1278kHz
