= Xinjiang Television =

Television network of Xinjiang, China

- Current logo, used since 2012.
- Xinjiang; China
- City: Ürümqi

Programming
- Languages: Chinese; Uyghur; Kazakh; Kyrgyz; Mongolian; Oirat

History
- Founded: 1 October 1970

Links
- Website: www.xjtvs.com.cn

Xinjiang Television (XJTV (Note: simplified Chinese: 新疆电视台; traditional Chinese: 新疆電視台; pinyin: Xīnjiāng Diànshìtái; Uyghur: شىنجاڭ تېلېۋىزىيە ئىستانسى, romanized: Shinjang Tëlëviziye Istansi; Kazakh: شينجياڭ تەلەۆيزيا, romanized: Şyñjañ Televiziia, Oirat: Шинҗәң Телеүзлһн, romanized: Şincəñ Teleüzlhn)) is a local television network station in the Xinjiang Uyghur Autonomous Region, China. It is the major television station in Xinjiang and located in the capital Ürümqi. It was founded on and launched broadcasting on October 1, 1970, on VHF channel 8. XJTV currently broadcasts in Chinese, Uyghur, Kazakh, Kyrgyz and Mongolian languages. In May 2019, Xinjiang Television signed a strategic cooperation and technical assistance agreement with Huawei. So far, it is the only TV channel using a Turkic language based in a communist country, but not within former-Eastern Bloc and Soviet territory.

== List of TV Channels ==
Name	Chinese name	Other minority-language names
Current channels
Xinjiang Satellite TV (XJTV-1)	新疆卫视(汉语)	
Xinjiang TV Uyghur (XJTV-2)	新疆卫视(维吾尔语)	شىنجاڭ تېلېۋىزىيە ئۇيغۇرلىرى
Xinjiang TV Kazakh (XJTV-3)	新疆卫视(哈萨克语)	Arabic: شينجياڭ راديوـ تەلەۆيزياستانسياسى Cyrillic: Шыңжаң Радио-Телевизия станциясы Latin: Şyñjañ Radio-Televizia stantsiasy
Chinese Variety Channel (XJTV-4)	汉语综艺频道	
Uyghur Variety Channel (XJTV-5)	维吾尔语综艺频道	ئۇيغۇر كۆپ خىل قانىلى
Chinese Drama Channel (XJTV-6)	汉语影视频道	
Sport Health Channel (XJTV-7, Previously as XJTV10)	体育健康频道	
Children's Channel (XJTV Kids, XJTV8, Previously as XJTV12)	少儿频道	Mostly airs in Mandarin, yet also aired in minority languages, like Uyghur, Kazakh and (formerly) Kyrgyz.
Former channels
Kazakh Variety channel (XJTV-8)	哈萨克语综艺频道	Arabic: الۋان ونەرارناسى Cyrillic: Аалуана онерарнасй Ceased broadcasting on July 2, 2025.
Chinese Economic-life channel (XJTV-7)	汉语经济生活频道	Ceased broadcasting on July 2, 2025.
Uyghur Economic-life channel (XJTV-9)	维吾尔语经济生活频道	ئۇيغۇر ئىقتىساد-ھايات يولى; Ceased broadcasting on July 2, 2025.
Law Information channel (XJTV-11)	法制信息频道	Ceased broadcasting on July 2, 2025.
Tianshan Theatre channel (XJTV-13)	天山剧场频道	Ceased broadcasting in 2019.
Entertainment Bazaar channel (XJTV-14)	娱乐巴扎频道	Ceased broadcasting in 2019.
Online Education channel (XJTV-15)	教育在线频道	Ceased broadcasting in 2019.
