= Inner Mongolia Radio and Television =

Chinese television and radio network

Inner Mongolia Radio and Television (NMTV)
- Type: Broadcast
- Country: People's Republic of China
- Official website: http://www.nmtv.cn/

Inner Mongolia Radio and Television (NMTV, Chinese: 内蒙古广播电视台; pinyin: Nèiménggǔ guǎngbò diànshìtái; Mongolian: ᠥᠪᠦᠷ
ᠮᠣᠩᠭᠣᠯ
ᠤᠨ
ᠷᠠᠳᠢᠣ᠋
ᠲᠧᠯᠸᠢᠰ
ᠬᠣᠷᠢᠶ᠎ᠠ, Өвөр Монголын Радио-Телевиз Хороо, romanized: Övör Mongolyn Radio-Televiz Khoroo) is a radio and television network in Hohhot, Inner Mongolia Autonomous Region. The Inner Mongolia Radio Broadcasting Network started in 1950, television in 1960; both were united in 2016. NMTV currently broadcasts in Mandarin and Mongolian.

NMTV is also carried in Mongolia on cable. In Mongolia, the channel wasn't popular as of 2006, because it provided its own view on Mongolian history.

== See also ==
- Mongolian National Broadcaster
