= CCTV-1 =

Television channel in China

CCTV-1 综合
- Country: China
- Broadcast area: Mainland China, Hong Kong, and Macau
- Headquarters: China Media Group Headquarters (production); CCTV Headquarters (broadcasting)

Programming
- Language: Mandarin
- Picture format: 1080i HDTV (downscaled to 576i for the SDTV feed)

Ownership
- Owner: China Central Television
- Sister channels: CCTV-14; CCTV-5; CCTV-17; CCTV-13

History
- Launched: 1 May 1958; 68 years ago (Test Transmission); 2 September 1958; 68 years ago (Launch Transmission)
- Former names: Peking Television (2 May 1958 – 30 April 1978); CCTV (main channel) (1 May 1978 – 31 January 1987); China Central Television First Program (1 February 1987 – 2 April 1995); China Central Television News and Comprehension Channel (3 April 1995 – 7 May 2003)

Links
- Website: cctv.cntv.cn

Availability

Terrestrial
- Digital TV (DTMB): Digital channel number varies by area.
- RTHK (Hong Kong): Channel 33 (HD)
- TDM (Macau): Channel 71 (SD)

Streaming media
- CCTV program website: CCTV-1

CCTV-1 (CCTV General Channel) is the primary channel of CCTV, the national flagship terrestrial television network of the People's Republic of China. It broadcasts a range of programs from CCTV Headquarters at East 3rd Ring Road in Beijing and is available to both cable and terrestrial television viewers. The terrestrial signal of CCTV-1 is free-to-air across China. However, due to copyright restrictions, the satellite signal of CCTV-1 is encrypted, and smartcards are necessary for decryption.

== History ==
=== Peking Television (2 May 1958 – 30 April 1978) ===
Initially branded as Peking Television (not to be confused with the present-day Beijing Television), CCTV-1 was launched on an experimental basis on 2 May 1958 and officially regular broadcasting for 4 hours 30 minutes each day starting on 2 September 1958. Peking Television was granted a free-to-air terrestrial television broadcasting license in the 1960s. From 6 January to 4 February 1967, Beijing Television's transmissions were suspended when the Rebel Faction temporarily seized power. It began broadcasting experimentally in colour in 1971 and was later launched via satellite transmissions in 1973 for major events. The first color programs were PAL-D/K, and full-time color broadcasting began in 1977.

=== China Central Television (Since 1 May 1978) ===
Logo of CCTV-1 (1988–1992)

On 1 May 1978, Peking Television was renamed China Central Television (CCTV) with the approval of the Central Committee of the Chinese Communist Party. CCTV began domestic satellite transmissions in 1984 using the Dong Fang Hong 2 satellite. In 1988, it began stereo broadcasting on all television channels. In 1994, it moved satellite broadcasting from Chinasat-3 to Chinasat-4, a quality-level broadcaster. That same year, it was receivable in 51% of Guangzhou. It turned on its digital signal in 2002. CCTV-1 began broadcasting 24 hours a day on 1 October 2004 and began high-definition broadcasting on 28 September 2009. On 1 March 2011, Hong Kong's Asia Television (ATV) started relaying CCTV-1 instead of CCTV-4, a Hong Kong–based free-to-air digital terrestrial station that is usually tuned to 15 on the UHF band. On 29 May 2017, Hong Kong's RTHK started relaying CCTV-1 instead of CGTN Documentary, a Hong Kong–based free-to-air digital terrestrial station that is usually tuned to 33 on the high-definition television.

== High-definition ==
CCTV-1 HD is a simulcast network version of CCTV-1 in high-definition. All standard-definition content is upscaled to high-definition output. The rest of the programming hours consist of mainly upscaled resolution CCTV-1 simulcast. The horizontal resolution was increased to 1920 pixels. CCTV-1 HD was created specifically for the 2008 Summer Olympics and the 2008 Summer Paralympics at the Beijing National Stadium. For the duration of the 2012 Summer Olympics broadcasting was increased to 24 hours a day to provide extra coverage of the Summer Olympic Games events.

== Hong Kong and Macau version ==
A re-compiled edition of CCTV-1 started broadcasting in Hong Kong and Macau on 1 March 2011, and relaunched on digital terrestrial television on 29 May 2017. On 21 December 2016, the channel was included in the list of basic channels for Macanese households, on DTT LCN 71.

Due to copyright and law restrictions, commercial advertisements, some television dramas, and some entertainment shows are not aired on CCTV-1 Hong Kong and Macau versions.

== Logo Evolution ==
=== CCTV-1 era ===
1978-1987

1987-1988

1988-February 1992

February-August 1992

August-December 1992

1993-1998

1998-2001

2001-2010

2011-present
