= Digital Terrestrial Multimedia Broadcast =

Chinese digital TV standard

DTMB (Digital Terrestrial Multimedia Broadcast) (Chinese: 数字地面多媒体广播) is the digital TV standard for mobile and fixed devices, developed in the People's Republic of China. It is used there and in both of their special administrative regions (Hong Kong and Macau), and also in Cambodia, the Comoros, Cuba, East Timor, Laos and Pakistan. In Pakistan, as part of the China–Pakistan Economic Corridor Project, ZTE Corporation will provide Pakistan Television Corporation collaboration across several digital terrestrial television technologies, staff training, and content creation, including partnerships with Chinese multinational companies in multiple areas, such as television sets and set top boxes, as a form of "International Cooperation".

== Overview ==
Previously known as DMB-T/H (Digital Multimedia Broadcast-Terrestrial/Handheld), the DTMB is a merger of the standards ADTB-T (developed by the Shanghai Jiao Tong University), DMB-T (developed by Tsinghua University), and TiMi (Terrestrial Interactive Multiservice Infrastructure); this last one is the standard proposed by the Academy of Broadcasting Science in 2002.

At first, neither Shanghai Jiao Tong University nor Tsinghua had enough political strength to make their own technology become the unique standard, so the final decision was to opt for a double standard, merged with the TIMI 3 standard, responding to a need for backward compatibility.

The DTMB was created in 2004 and finally became an official DTT standard in 2006.

=== DTMB in China ===
- 2005 trial
- 01/01/2006 formal adoption and official launch as a DTT standard
- 08/08/2008 analog switchoff started
- 01/01/2015 analog switchoff completed

=== DTMB channel available in China ===
- National:
  - CCTV-1, 2, 4, 9-15, 17, CGTN English
- Provinces:

Main channel of province TV in each province

- High Definition Channel:
  - Varies
- City or Local channel:
  - Varies

=== DTMB in Hong Kong ===
- 01/01/2006 formal adoption and official launch as a DTT standard
- 31/12/2007 analogue switchoff started
- 01/01/2015 analogue switchoff completed

=== DTMB in Macau ===
- 01/01/2006 formal adoption and official launch as a DTT standard
- 15/07/2008 analogue switchoff started
- 01/01/2015 analogue switchoff completed

=== DTMB elsewhere ===
- DTMB started in Laos in 2007.
- Cambodia adopted the DTMB standard in 2012.
- The Comoros chose DTMB in 2013.
- Cuba adopted DTMB in 2013.
- In 2017, Pakistan and ZTE signed a contract to deploy DTMB broadcasts in the country by 2020.
- East Timor adopted DTMB, and work to implement it started in 2019.

== Versus CMMB ==
See China Multimedia Mobile Broadcasting (CMMB).

== Countries and territories using DTMB ==
DTT broadcasting systems. Countries using DTMB are shown in purple.

As of August 2025, the following countries use the DTMB broadcast standard: neighbouring countries may also pick up DTMB signals due to signal overspill.

=== Asia ===
- Cambodia
- China, including its SARs:
  - Hong Kong
  - Macau
- Timor-Leste
- Laos
- Pakistan

=== Caribbean ===
- Cuba

=== Africa ===
- Comoros

== Description ==
Besides the basic functions of traditional television service, the DTMB allows additional services using the new television broadcasting system. DTMB system is compatible with fixed reception (indoor and outdoor) and mobile digital terrestrial television.

- Mobile reception: is compatible with digital broadcasting TV in standard definition (SD), digital audio broadcasting, multimedia broadcasting, and data broadcasting service.
- Fixed reception: in addition to the previous services, also supports high definition digital broadcasting (HDTV).

=== Modulation ===
The DTMB standard uses many advanced technologies to improve their performance. For example, a pseudo-random noise code (PN) as a guard interval that allows faster synchronization system and a more accurate channel estimation, Low-Density Parity Check (LDPC) for error correction, modulation Time Domain Synchronization - Orthogonal Frequency Division Multiplexing (TDS-OFDM), which allows the combination of broadcasting in SD, HD, and multimedia services, etc.

This system gives flexibility to the services offered to support the combination of single-frequency networks (SFN) and multi-frequency networks (MFN). The different modes and parameters can be chosen, depending on the type of service and network's environment.

The sequence of pseudo-random pattern is defined in time domain, and the information of the Discrete Fourier transform (DFT) is defined in the frequency domain. The two frames are multiplexed in the time domain, resulting in Time domain synchronization (TDS).

=== Functional scheme ===
This transmission system makes the conversion of the input signal to the output data of terrestrial TV signal.

The data passes through the encoder, the error protection process FEC (Forward Error Correction), through the constellation mapping process, and then the interleaving processes the information to create the data blocks. The data block and the TPS information are multiplexed, and pass through the data processor to form the body structure. It combines information from the body and the head to form the frame and this is passed through the SRRC (Square Root Raised Cosine) filter to become a signal within an 8 MHz channel bandwidth. Finally, the signal is modulated to put it in the corresponding frequency band.

=== Features ===
- Bit-rate: from 4.813 Mbit/s to 32.486 Mbit/s
- Combination of SD, HD, and multimedia services
- Flexibility of services
- Time and frequency domain of data-processing
- Broadcasting of between 6 and 15 SD channels and 1 or 2 HD channels
- Same quality of reception as wire broadcast

== See also ==
- CMMB
- OFDM system comparison table
- Media of China
- Telecommunications in China
- Telecommunications industry in China
- Digital television in China (PRC)
- Technical standards in Hong Kong
- Digital terrestrial television
- ATSC standards – Advanced Television Systems Committee Standard
- DVB-T – Digital Video Broadcasting—Terrestrial
- ISDB-T International – Integrated Services Digital Broadcasting International
