= 2007 in Philippine television =

The following is a list of events affecting Philippine television in 2007. Events listed include television show debuts, finales, cancellations, and channel launches, closures and rebrandings, as well as information about controversies and carriage disputes.

== Events ==
=== January ===
- January 1: The Philippine government announced that commercials and sponsorships related to tobacco products on television and radio will be banned due to Republic Act No. 9211, Section 22, or the Tobacco Regulation Act of 2003.

=== February ===
- February 19: Robert Jaworski wins the 1.7 million pesos of Kapamilya, Deal or No Deal.

=== May ===
- May 14–15: All Philippine TV networks had its special coverage of the 2007 mid-term elections.

=== June ===
- June 30: Beatriz Saw wins the Pinoy Big Brother: Season 2

=== July ===
- July 10: Jennel Montero wins the 1 million pesos of Kapamilya, Deal or No Deal.
- July 24: Smart Communications and 360media launched a commercial mobile TV service to binge-watch television channels and programs through phone devices, myTV.

=== August ===
- The name "ABS-CBN Corporation" began to be used as the media conglomerate's name to reflect its diversification as the company focuses on other businesses aside from broadcasting, with the "ABS-CBN Broadcasting Corporation" name is still used as the conglomerate's alternative and secondary name in certain contexts.
- August 6: Allen Paul Aguada wins the 2 million pesos of Kapamilya, Deal or No Deal.
- August 20: Hello Pappy scandal During the August 20, 2007, episode of the ABS-CBN program Wowowee, The incident prompted an investigation by the country's Department of Trade and Industry (DTI), and was also the catalyst of an on-air feud between Revillame and Joey de Leon, a personality from the rival GMA Network.

=== September ===
- September 5: Jerhan Mama-O wins the 2 million pesos of Kapamilya, Deal or No Deal.

=== October ===
- October 2: Rene Lamprea wins the 1.25 million pesos of Kapamilya, Deal or No Deal.
- October 16: Melody Macol wins the 1 million pesos of Kapamilya, Deal or No Deal.
- October 22: Aiko Melendez wins the 1 million pesos of Kapamilya, Deal or No Deal.

=== November ===
- November 22: Kim Atienza wins the 1 million pesos of Kapamilya, Deal or No Deal.

=== December ===
- December 6–15: NBN 4, ABC 5 and IBC 13 airs the 2007 Southeast Asian Games "A Time for Heroes" coverage.
- December 12: Maria Rosario Odabel wins the 1 million pesos of Kapamilya, Deal or No Deal.
- December 14: AGB Nielsen Philippine TV ratings controversy was a legal dispute involving AGB Nielsen Philippines, GMA Network, Inc., and ABS-CBN Corporation over an alleged television ratings breach in the Western Visayas cities of Bacolod and Iloilo. The controversy began in the final quarter of 2007 and continued into 2008. "AGB Nielsen, umamin sa dayaan: GMA Network, tahasang itinurong nasa likod ng dayaan"

== Premieres ==
Date	Show
January 8	Sana Maulit Muli on ABS-CBN 2
January 8	Jumong on GMA 7
January 15	Asian Treasures on GMA 7
January 21	Daddy Long Legs on QTV 11
January 25	Sugar Sugar Rune on QTV 11
January 29	Princess Charming on GMA 7
January 29	Daisy Siete: Siete Siete, Mano Mano on GMA 7
January 29	Full House (rerun) on GMA 7
January 29	One Piece (New Episodes) on GMA 7
February 1	Kiddy Grade on QTV 11
February 4	Magic Kamison on GMA 7
February 4	Mga Kuwento ni Lola Basyang on GMA 7
February 10	Little Big Superstar on ABS-CBN 2
February 10	Kabataan Xpress on ABS-CBN 2
February 12	Detective Conan on GMA 7
February 12	Maria Flordeluna on ABS-CBN 2
February 12	Super Twins on GMA 7
February 14	The Ricky Lo Exclusives on QTV 11
February 17	Power Rangers S.P.D. on ABS-CBN 2
February 17	Sine Totoo on GMA 7
February 19	Muli on GMA 7
February 19	Flame of Recca (rerun) on GMA 7
February 19	AM Driver on QTV 11
February 19	All About Eve on QTV 11
February 25	Pinoy Big Brother: Season 2 on ABS-CBN 2
March 2	Sabado Boys on RPN 9
March 3	Something About 1% on ABS-CBN 2
March 5	Palimos ng Pag-ibig on ABS-CBN 2
March 5	Showbiz Ka! on RPN 9
March 9	Sabi ni Nanay on RPN 9
March 12	Gokusen 2 on GMA 7
March 12	RPN iWatch News on RPN 9
March 12	Pinokyo at ang Blue Fairy on RPN 9
March 12	Ke-Mis: Kay Misis Umaasa on RPN 9
March 12	Dalawang Tisoy on RPN 9
March 13	Philippines' Next Top Model on RPN 9
March 19	CLTV 36 Balitaan on CLTV 36
March 19	Flash Report sa Q on Q 11
March 19	The Sweet Life on Q 11
March 22	Here Comes the Bride on Q 11
March 23	Stars on Ice on Q 11
March 24	Masked Rider Blade on GMA 7
March 25	Philippine Agenda on GMA 7
March 25	Spoon on Net 25
March 31	Kapuso Movie Festival (Saturday edition) on GMA 7
April 5	Dr. 90210 on 2nd Avenue
April 7	ER on 2nd Avenue
April 9	One Million Roses on GMA 7
April 9	My Strange Family on GMA 7
April 9	Minuto on NBN 4
April 9	Lupin on GMA 7
April 9	Live on Q on Q 11
April 9	Mice Loves Rice on Q 11
April 9	One Morning Cafe on NBN 4, RPN 9 and IBC 13
April 9	TV Patrol Negros on ABS-CBN TV-4 Bacolod
April 12	Gising Pilipinas on DZMM TeleRadyo
April 12	Todo Balita on DZMM TeleRadyo
April 12	Radyo Patrol Balita on DZMM TeleRadyo
April 12	Dos Por Dos on DZMM TeleRadyo
April 12	Tambalang Failon at Sanchez on DZMM TeleRadyo
April 12	Todo-Todo Walang Preno on DZMM TeleRadyo
April 12	Aksyon Ngayon on DZMM TeleRadyo
April 12	Maalaala Mo Kaya sa DZMM on DZMM TeleRadyo
April 12	Showbiz Mismo on DZMM TeleRadyo
April 12	Panalangin sa Alas-Tres ng Hapon on DZMM TeleRadyo
April 12	Pasada Sais Trenta on DZMM TeleRadyo
April 12	TV Patrol World on DZMM TeleRadyo
April 12	Talkback sa DZMM on DZMM TeleRadyo
April 12	Usapang de Campanilla on DZMM TeleRadyo
April 12	Dr. Love Radio Show on DZMM TeleRadyo
April 12	Bandila on DZMM TeleRadyo
April 12	A.M.Y. (About Me and You) on DZMM TeleRadyo
April 12	Lovelines on DZMM TeleRadyo
April 13	Buhay at Kalusugan on DZMM TeleRadyo
April 14	Samurai 7 on GMA 7
April 14	Fantastic Man on GMA 7
April 14	Sa Kabukiran on DZMM TeleRadyo
April 14	Magandang Morning with Julius at Tintin on DZMM TeleRadyo
April 14	Para sa 'Yo Bayan on DZMM TeleRadyo
April 14	Konsyumer, Atbp. on DZMM TeleRadyo
April 14	Magpayo Nga Kayo on DZMM TeleRadyo
April 14	Ito ang Radyo Patrol on DZMM TeleRadyo
April 14	Sports Talk on DZMM TeleRadyo
April 14	U-Talk on DZMM TeleRadyo
April 14	Pasada Sais Trenta Sabado on DZMM TeleRadyo
April 14	SOCO sa DZMM on DZMM TeleRadyo
April 14	Radyo Negosyo on DZMM TeleRadyo
April 14	It’s Showtime with Billy Balbastro on DZMM TeleRadyo
April 14	What’s it All About, Alfie? on DZMM TeleRadyo
April 14	TV Patrol Sabado on DZMM TeleRadyo
April 14	Level Up! TV on Hero
April 15	Sagot Ko Yan on DZMM TeleRadyo
April 15	SIKAPINOY on DZMM TeleRadyo
April 15	Gabay Kalusugan on DZMM TeleRadyo
April 15	MaBeauty Po Naman on DZMM TeleRadyo
April 15	Music & Memories on DZMM TeleRadyo
April 15	Dear Kuya Cesar on DZMM TeleRadyo
April 15	Pintig Balita on DZMM TeleRadyo
April 15	Ikaw sa Likod ng mga Awit on DZMM TeleRadyo
April 15	Bago Yan Ah! on DZMM TeleRadyo
April 15	TV Patrol Linggo on DZMM TeleRadyo
April 15	Dra. Bles @ Ur Serbis on DZMM TeleRadyo
April 15	Innermind on Radio on DZMM TeleRadyo
April 15	Salitang Buhay on DZMM TeleRadyo
April 16	Burst Angel on Q 11
April 16	Bleach on GMA 7
April 16	Rounin on ABS-CBN 2
April 16	Who's Your Daddy Now? on GMA 7
April 22	Dog of Flanders on Q 11
April 23	Love Truly on GMA 7
April 23	Tenjho Tenge on GMA 7
April 23	Hana Yori Dango on GMA 7
April 23	Hiram na Mukha on ABS-CBN 2
April 23	Walang Kapalit on ABS-CBN 2
April 28	Kids on Q on Q 11
April 28	Sirit on ABS-CBN 2
April 29	Showbiz Central on GMA 7
April 30	Sinasamba Kita on GMA 7
April 30	Daisy Siete: Isla Chikita on GMA 7
May 5	Komiks Presents: Pedro Penduko at ang mga Engkantao on ABS-CBN 2
May 7	Love in Heaven on GMA 7
May 14	Stairway to Heaven on Q 11
May 15	Sound of Colors on Q 11
May 19	Saturday Afternoon Blockbuster on ABS-CBN 2
May 21	Pati Ba Pintig ng Puso on GMA 7
May 21	Silence on Q 11
May 25	3rd Row on 2nd Avenue
May 26	Wow Mali Bytes on ABC 5
May 27	Tok! Tok! Tok! Isang Milyon Pasok (season 1) on GMA 7
May 28	Which Star Are You From on ABS-CBN 2
May 28	GTO Live on GMA 7
June 2	Gokada Go! on ABS-CBN 2
June 2	Abt Ur Luv on ABS-CBN 2
June 4	May Minamahal on ABS-CBN 2
June 4	Sgt. Keroro on ABS-CBN 2
June 4	Impostora on GMA 7
June 4	Green Forest on Q 11
June 10	Move: Billy Crawford's Search for the Next Pinoy Dancers on GMA 7
June 11	Kapamilya, Deal or No Deal (season 2) on ABS-CBN 2
June 17	IKON Philippines on RPN 9
June 19	Mommy Elvie's Problematic Show on ABC 5
June 23	GMA Weekend Report on GMA 7
June 24	Boys Nxt Door on GMA 7
June 25	Pretty Cure on ABS-CBN 2
June 25	Umagang Kay Ganda on ABS-CBN 2
June 25	Ysabella on ABS-CBN 2
July 2	Mga Mata ni Anghelita on GMA 7
July 2	Boy & Kris on ABS-CBN 2
July 9	Meteor Garden on GMA 7
July 9	Eyeshield 21 on ABS-CBN 2
July 16	Foxy Lady on GMA 7
July 16	Natutulog Ba ang Diyos? on ABS-CBN 2
July 16	A Rosy Life on Q 11
July 21	Slingo on ABC 5
July 23	Good Morning Kuya on UNTV 37
July 23	Hataw Balita News Update on UNTV 37
July 23	Hataw Balita Primetime on UNTV 37
July 23	Hello, God! on Q 11
July 29	That's My Doc on ABS-CBN 2
July 30	Kung Mahawi Man ang Ulap on GMA 7
July 30	Daisy Siete: Tabaching-ching on GMA 7
July 30	Lovers in Prague on GMA 7
July 30	Margarita on ABS-CBN 2
July 30	Princess Sarah (rerun) on ABS-CBN 2
July 30	Yakitate!! Japan on ABS-CBN 2
July 30	Pinoy Movie Hits on ABS-CBN 2
August 4	Entertainment Live on ABS-CBN 2
August 4	Wow Mali Express on ABC 5
August 4	Mad, Mad Fun on Animax Asia
August 5	Chef to Go on Q 11
August 5	Coca-Cola's Ride to Fame: Yes to Your Dreams! on GMA 7
August 5	Ful Haus on GMA 7
August 6	Kokey on ABS-CBN 2
August 8	Tutugan on Myx
August 11	Celebrity Duets: Philippine Edition on GMA 7
August 11	Review Philippines on Q 11
August 12	Hot Seat on Q 11
August 13	i-Balita on Net 25
August 13	MariMar on GMA 7
August 13	Hollywood Boot Camp on Q 11
August 13	Only You on Q 11
August 19	Kap's Amazing Stories on GMA 7
August 25	1 vs. 100 on ABS-CBN 2
August 27	Kabarkada, Break the Bank on Studio 23
August 27	Le Robe de Marriage on Q 11
August 27	The 100th Bride on Q 11
August 29	Kantabataan on Myx
September 1	American Dragon: Jake Long on ABS-CBN 2
September 1	M.I.T. 20 on Myx
September 3	Pangarap na Bituin on ABS-CBN 2
September 3	Ito Ang Balita on UNTV 37
September 3	A Farewall to Sorrow on Q 11
September 3	Miss Kim's Million Dollar Quest on Q 11
September 5	Shoot That Babe on RPN 9
September 7	Prime K Primera Klase on RPN 9
September 8	Youth Alive on RPN 9
September 9	Musika, Atbp. on DZMM TeleRadyo
September 9	Pinoy Vibes on DZMM TeleRadyo
September 9	Private Nights on DZMM TeleRadyo
September 10	Pasan Ko ang Daigdig on GMA 7
September 10	Zorro: The Sword and the Rose on ABS-CBN 2
September 10	Digimon Tamers on ABS-CBN 2
September 15	Planet Q on Q 11
September 16	Ano Bang Trip Mo? on Studio 23
September 21	Banyuhay on RPN 9
September 21	Survivor: China on RPN 9
September 22	Mice Love Rice on Q 11
September 24	Zaido: Pulis Pangkalawakan on GMA 7
September 24	Couple or Trouble on GMA 7
September 24	Lastikman on ABS-CBN 2
September 24	Lavender on Q 11
October 1	Lovers in Prague on Q 11
October 1	Prudence Investigations on Q 11
October 1	Grimm's Fairy Tales on Q 11
October 1	The Jungle Book on Q 11
October 1	Cedie, Ang Munting Prinsipe (rerun) on ABS-CBN 2
October 8	Arangkada! on GMA Iloilo
October 8	Buena Mano Balita on GMA Cebu
October 8	Una Ka BAI on GMA Davao
October 8	Prinsesa ng Banyera on ABS-CBN 2
October 8	Meteor Rain on GMA 7
October 8	Whammy! Push Your Luck on GMA 7
October 8	Hwang Jini on GMA 7
October 8	City of Sky on Q 11
October 8	The Sobrang Gud Nite Show with Jojo A. All the Way! on Q 11
October 14	Pinoy Big Brother: Celebrity Edition 2 on ABS-CBN 2
October 15	Seniorita Mei Mei on Q 11
October 15	Love Generation on Q 11
October 21	Ka-Pete Na! Totally Outrageous Behavior on ABS-CBN 2
October 22	Meteor Garden II on GMA 7
October 22	The Wizard of Oz on Q 11
October 22	Tablescapes... Life on a Plate on Studio 23
October 23	Macho Gwapito on Makisig Network
October 23	Venus Cooks for Mars on Makisig Network
October 24	At Your Pleasure, Nancy on Makisig Network
October 24	Pinoy Gamers on Makisig Network
October 24	Timepieces on Makisig Network
October 25	Living the Life on Makisig Network
October 25	Mad About Wheels on Makisig Network
October 25	Ur Sport on Makisig Network
October 26	Fit and Fast on Makisig Network
October 26	Menpower on Makisig Network
October 27	Kakasa Ka Ba sa Grade 5? (season 1) on GMA 7
October 27	Pinoy Mano Mano: Celebrity Boxing Challenge on ABS-CBN 2
October 29	La Vendetta on GMA 7
October 29	Guardian Angel on Q 11
October 29	Love Story of A Star on Q 11
October 29	Beautiful Life on Q 11
October 29	Long Vacation on Q 11
October 29	Win Win Win on ABC 5
November 3	Super Inggo 1.5: Ang Bagong Bangis on ABS-CBN 2
November 3	Love Story in Harvard on Q 11
November 4	Doc on TV on UNTV 37
November 5	Capeta on ABS-CBN 2
November 5	Cooking Master Boy on ABS-CBN 2
November 5	Certified Kasangbahay on UNTV 37
November 10	Moments on Net 25
November 10	Air Gear on ABS-CBN 2
November 10	Eureka Seven on ABS-CBN 2
November 10	School Rumble on ABS-CBN 2
November 12	Judge Bao on ABC 5
November 12	Princess Sarah on ABS-CBN 2
November 17	Halika! on Q 11
November 18	WWE SmackDown on ABC 5
November 19	Kamandag on GMA 7
November 19	Daisy Siete: Ulingling on GMA 7
November 19	The Three Musketeers on Q 11
November 19	Vision of Escaflowne on Q 11
November 24	Eat Na Ta! on GMA Cebu
November 26	Those Who Hunt Elves on Q 11
November 26	Reaching for the Stars on Q 11
November 28	Born to Be Wild on GMA 7
December 3	Kung Fu Soccer on Q 11
December 3	Elementar Gerad on Q 11
December 3	Sound of Colors on Q 11
December 3	My 19 Year Old Sister-in-Law on Q 11
December 3	Frog Prince on Q 11
December 8	Pinoy Records on GMA 7
December 10	Maging Sino Ka Man: Ang Pagbabalik on ABS-CBN 2
December 10	Captain Flamingo on Q 11
December 10	The Snow Queen on Q 11
December 10	Smile Again on Q 11
December 17	Come Back, Soon-ae on GMA 7
December 17	Merry Morning Cartoons on ABS-CBN 2
December 22	Sabado Movie Specials on ABS-CBN 2
December 24	House Husband on Q 11
December 24	Stairway to Heaven on Q 11
December 25	Spring Waltz on ABS-CBN 2
December 29	Super Monkey Adventure on Q 11
December 31	Trapp Family Singers (rerun) on ABS-CBN 2

=== Unknown dates ===
- March:
  - Living It Up on Q 11
  - Entertainment Tonight on 2nd Avenue
  - The Insider on 2nd Avenue
- April: Camera Café on GMA 7
- August: Rush TV on Studio 23
- September: Gossip Girl on ETC
- October: Mga Waging Kuwento ng OFW on Q 11
- November: House of Hoops on ABC 5
- December: Friends Again on NBN 4

=== Unknown ===
- The Search for the Next White Castle Girl on ABS-CBN 2
- Just Joking on GMA 7
- Move: The Search for Billy Crawford's Pinoy Dancers on GMA 7
- Starting Over on 2nd Avenue
- The Daily 10 on ETC
- Top Chef on 2nd Avenue
- Sports 37 on UNTV 37
- Bread Tambayan on UNTV 37
- Bihasa: Bibliya Hamon Sa'yo on UNTV 37
- Doc on TV on UNTV 37
- Hometown: Doon Po Sa Amin on UNTV 37
- Katha on UNTV 37
- Boses on NBN 4
- Friends Again on NBN 4
- Katapatan sa Watawat at Lipunan (K.A.W.A.L.) on NBN 4
- Makabayang Doktor on NBN 4
- Minuto on NBN 4
- Pilipinas Ngayon Na! on NBN 4
- She...Ka! on NBN 4
- Sing! Sing! on NBN 4
- Sining Gising: NCCA Ugnayan sa Tinig ng Bayan on NBN 4
- Talk Ko 'To! on NBN 4
- Taas Noo, Bulakenyo! on NBN 4
- Taas Noo, Pilipino! on NBN 4
- Talakayan sa Isyung Pulis on NBN 4
- The Young Once on NBN 4
- Krusada Kontra Korupsyon on NBN 4/RPN 9/IBC 13
- Ratsada E on IBC 13
- Mommy Academy on IBC 13
- Ating Alamin on IBC 13
- Iba Na ang Matalino: The Nutroplex Brain Challenge on Q 11
- Masigasig on Q 11
- Michelle Simone's Entertains on Q 11
- Astig PBA on ABC 5
- Buhay PBA on ABC 5
- Buhay Pinoy on ABC 5
- Double W on ABC 5
- Kerygma TV on ABC 5
- Lucida DS: United Shelter Health Show on ABC 5
- Pool Showdown on ABC 5
- W.O.W.: What's on Weekend on ABC 5
- All Grown Up! on ABC 5
- Asian Idol on ABC 5
- Avatar: The Legend of Aang on ABC 5
- Oh Yeah! Cartoons on ABC 5
- Signs and Wonders on ABC 5
- Finishline on RPN 9
- Go Negosyo Bigtime on RPN 9
- K Na Tayo! on RPN 9
- Kol TV on RPN 9
- Last Full Show on RPN 9
- One Night with an Angel on RPN 9
- Parenting 101 on RPN 9
- Premier Dart on RPN 9
- Sargo on RPN 9
- Single Girls on RPN 9
- Talk Toons on RPN 9
- The So-called Life Of Ryan Garcia is Going Public on RPN 9
- TruSports on RPN 9
- Kaibigan on RJTV 29
- Saturday Night Live with Jorel Tan on RJTV 29
- Wednesday Underground on RJTV 29

== Returning or renamed programs ==
Show	Last aired	Retitled as/Season/Notes	Channel	Return date
Flordeluna	1988 (RPN)	Maria Flordeluna	ABS-CBN	February 12
Pinoy Big Brother	2005 (season 1)	Same (season 2)	ABS-CBN	February 25
Philippine Basketball Association	2007 (season 32: "Philippine Cup")	Same (season 32: "Fiesta Conference")	ABC	March 4
Flash Report sa QTV	2007 (QTV)	Flash Report sa Q	Q	March 19
Philippine Basketball League	2007 (season 24: "Silver Cup")	Same (season 24: "Unity Cup")	Studio 23	April 17
Shakey's V-League	2006 (ABC; season 3: "1st Conference")	Same (season 4: "1st Conference")	NBN	May 17
Abt Ur Luv	2007	Same (season 2: "Abt Ur Luv: Ur Lyf 2")	ABS-CBN	June 2
Kapamilya, Deal or No Deal	2007	Same (season 2)	ABS-CBN	June 11
National Collegiate Athletic Association	2007	Same (season 83)	Studio 23	June 23
University Athletic Association of the Philippines	2007	Same (season 70)	Studio 23	July 7
Ito Ang Balita	2005	Same	UNTV	September 3
Survivor	2006 (Studio 23; season 13: "Cook Islands")	Same (season 15: "China")	RPN	September 21
Jojo A. All the Way!	2007 (RJTV)	The Sobrang Gud Nite Show with Jojo A. All the Way!	Q	October 8
Pinoy Big Brother	2006 (season 1: "Celebrity Edition 1")	Same (season 2: "Celebrity Edition 2")	ABS-CBN	October 14
Shakey's V-League	2007 (season 4: "1st Conference")	Same (season 4: "2nd Conference")	NBN	October 14
Philippine Basketball Association	2007 (season 32: "Fiesta Conference")	Same (season 33: "Philippine Cup")	ABC	October 14
Philippine Basketball League	2007 (Studio 23; season 24: "Unity Cup")	Same (season 25: "V-Go Extreme Energy Drink Cup")	Basketball TV	October 20
National Basketball Association	2007 (RPN / Basketball TV)	Same (2007–08 season)	ABC / Basketball TV	November
Maging Sino Ka Man	2007	Same (as Ang Pagbabalik)	ABS-CBN	December 10

== Programs transferring networks ==
Date	Show	No. of seasons	Moved from	Moved to
February 12	Flordeluna	—N/a	RPN	ABS-CBN (as Maria Flordeluna)
April 7	ER	—N/a	ABC	2nd Avenue
May 17	Shakey's V-League	4	ABC	NBN
July 9	Meteor Garden	—N/a	ABS-CBN	GMA
September 21	Survivor	15	Studio 23	RPN
October 8	Meteor Rain	—N/a	ABS-CBN	GMA
October 8	Jojo A. All the Way!	—N/a	RJTV	Q (as The Sobrang Gud Nite Show with Jojo A. All the Way!)
October 20	Philippine Basketball League	25	Studio 23	Basketball TV
October 22	Meteor Garden II	—N/a	ABS-CBN	GMA
November	National Basketball Association	62	RPN	ABC
November 10	WWE Raw	—N/a	RPN	ABC
November 18	WWE SmackDown	—N/a	RPN	ABC
Unknown	Ating Alamin	—N/a	ABC	IBC
Unknown	Buhay Pinoy	—N/a	RPN / SBN	ABC

== Finales ==
- January 5: A Rosy Life (GMA 7)
- January 12: Captain Barbell (GMA 7)
- January 26:
  - Daisy Siete: Moshi Moshi Chikiyaki (GMA 7)
  - O-Ha! (ABC 5)
- January 28:
  - Ang Mahiwagang Baul (GMA 7)
  - Kapuso Movie Festival (Sunday edition) (GMA 7)
- February 3: Little Big Star (ABS-CBN 2)
- February 7: Now Na! (QTV 11)
- February 9:
  - Cardcaptor Sakura (GMA 7)
  - Super Inggo (ABS-CBN 2)
  - Atlantika (GMA 7)
- February 10: Showbiz Stripped (GMA 7)
- February 16:
  - Makita Ka Lang Muli (GMA 7)
  - Ghost Fighter (rerun) (GMA 7)
- February 23: Kapamilya, Deal or No Deal (season 1) (ABS-CBN 2)
- February 24: Sabado Movie Greats (ABS-CBN 2)
- February 25: It Started with a Kiss (ABS-CBN 2)
- February 26: For M (RPN 9)
- March 9:
  - Jewel in the Palace by Popular Demand (GMA 7)
  - NewsWatch Now (RPN 9)
- March 10:
  - Kasangga Mo ang Langit (RPN 9)
  - Biyaheng Langit (RPN 9)
- March 16:
  - Ganda ng Lola Ko! (QTV 11)
  - Sad Love Song (QTV 11)
- March 18: Flash Report sa QTV (Q 11)
- March 25: StarStruck: The Next Level (GMA 7)
- March 30: Bakekang (GMA 7)
- March 31: Kapuso Movie Festival (Saturday edition) (GMA 7)
- April 4:
  - The Morning Show (NBN 4)
  - TV Patrol Bacolod (ABS-CBN TV-4 Bacolod)
  - Yellow Handkerchief (GMA 7)
- April 8:
  - NBN News Live (NBN 4)
  - Flash Report sa Q (Q 11)
- April 9: Lagot Ka... Isusumbong Kita! (GMA 7)
- April 12: Princess Hours (ABS-CBN 2)
- April 20:
  - Sana Maulit Muli (ABS-CBN 2)
  - Palimos ng Pag-ibig (ABS-CBN 2)
  - Full House (GMA 7)
  - One Piece (GMA 7)
  - Gokusen 2 (GMA 7)
- April 21: Kabataan Xpress (ABS-CBN 2)
- April 22: S-Files (GMA 7)
- April 27:
  - Princess Charming (GMA 7)
  - Daisy Siete: Siete Siete, Mano Mano (GMA 7)
- April 28: Da Adventures of Pedro Penduko (ABS-CBN 2)
- May 4:
  - One Million Roses (GMA 7)
  - Mirada de mujer (ABS-CBN 2)
  - My Strange Family (GMA 7)
- May 5: Aalog-Alog (ABS-CBN 2)
- May 11:
  - City of Sky (Q 11)
  - Mice Loves Rice (Q 11)
- May 12: Little Big Superstar (ABS-CBN 2)
- May 13: Philippine Agenda (GMA 7)
- May 18:
  - Muli (GMA 7)
  - All About Eve (Q 11)
- May 19:
  - Teka Mona (ABC 5)
  - Let's Go! (ABS-CBN 2)
- May 25:
  - Hana Yori Dango (GMA 7)
  - Maging Sino Ka Man (ABS-CBN 2)
- June 1:
  - Hiram na Mukha (ABS-CBN 2)
  - Mirmo! (ABS-CBN 2)
  - Super Twins (GMA 7)
  - Showbiz Ka! (RPN 9)
  - Sound of Colors (Q 11)
- June 2: Pinoy Pop Superstar (season 3) (GMA 7)
- June 13: Philippines' Next Top Model (RPN 9)
- June 17:
  - Flash Report Special Edition (GMA 7)
  - Magic Kamison (GMA 7)
- June 22:
  - Alice Academy (ABS-CBN 2)
  - Magandang Umaga, Pilipinas (ABS-CBN 2)
  - Maria Flordeluna (ABS-CBN 2)
  - Breakfast (Studio 23)
- June 28: Here Comes the Bride (Q 11)
- June 29:
  - Asian Treasures (GMA 7)
  - Homeboy (ABS-CBN 2)
- June 30: Pinoy Big Brother: Season 2 (ABS-CBN 2)
- July 6:
  - GTO Live (GMA 7)
  - Air Gear (ABS-CBN 2)
- July 10: Bahay Mo Ba 'To? (GMA 7)
- July 13:
  - May Minamahal (ABS-CBN 2)
  - Who's Your Daddy Now? (GMA 7)
  - MMS: My Music Station (Q 11)
  - Green Forest (Q 11)
- July 14: HP: To the Highest Level Na! (GMA 7)
- July 20:
  - Pilipinas, Gising Ka Na Ba? (UNTV 37)
  - What's Up Doc? (UNTV 37)
  - Kakampi Mo ang Batas (UNTV 37)
  - Public Hearing (UNTV 37)
  - Sound Connections (UNTV 37)
  - Stairway to Heaven (Q 11)
  - Wazzup Wazzup (Studio 23)
- July 22: Digital Tour (Studio 23)
- July 26:
  - Rounin (ABS-CBN 2)
  - Wansapanataym (ABS-CBN 2)
- July 27:
  - Sinasamba Kita (GMA 7)
  - Love Truly (GMA 7)
  - Daisy Siete: Isla Chikita (GMA 7)
  - Ang TV (ABS-CBN 2)
  - Sgt. Keroro (ABS-CBN 2)
  - The Law of Ueki (ABS-CBN 2)
  - Kapamilya Cinema (ABS-CBN 2)
- July 28:
  - Saturday Afternoon Blockbuster (ABS-CBN 2)
  - Wow Mali Bytes (ABC 5)
  - Gokada Go! (ABS-CBN 2)
- July 29:
  - Daddy Di Do Du (GMA 7)
  - Move: Billy Crawford's Search for the Next Pinoy Dancers (GMA 7)
  - Pop Star Kids (Q 11)
  - Something About 1% (ABS-CBN 2)
- August 3: Which Star Are You From (ABS-CBN 2)
- August 6: H3O: Ha Ha Ha Over (Q 11)
- August 10:
  - 1062 kHz Balita Update (Net 25)
  - Newsbeat (Net 25)
  - Dokyu (ABC 5)
  - Silence (Q 11)
- August 12:
  - Mga Kuwento ni Lola Basyang (GMA 7)
  - IKON Philippines (RPN 9)
  - At Home Ka Dito (ABS-CBN 2)
- August 14: Lovers in Prague (GMA 7)
- August 17: Lupin (GMA 7)
- August 18: Pichi Pichi Pitch (Q 11)
- August 24: A Rosy Life (Q 11)
- August 31:
  - Walang Kapalit (ABS-CBN 2)
  - Letty La Mas Fea (ABC 5)
  - Express Boy (Q 11)
  - Hataw Balita Primetime (UNTV 37)
- September 2:
  - Bongga! (GMA TV-6 Iloilo)
  - Dear Kuya Cesar (DZMM TeleRadyo)
  - Ikaw sa Likod ng mga Awit (DZMM TeleRadyo)
- September 7:
  - Inocente de ti (ABS-CBN 2)
  - Pati Ba Pintig ng Puso (GMA 7)
- September 8: Ay, Robot! (Q 11)
- September 14: Hello, God! (Q 11)
- September 15:
  - Maya & Miguel (ABS-CBN 2)
  - Lois & Clark: The New Adventures of Superman (Q 11)
- September 19: Totoo TV (ABC 5)
- September 21:
  - Margarita (ABS-CBN 2)
  - Impostora (GMA 7)
  - Love in Heaven (GMA 7)
  - Miss Kim's Million Dollar Quest (Q 11)
- September 28:
  - Princess Sarah (rerun) (ABS-CBN 2)
  - Le Robe de Marriage (Q 11)
- September 29:
  - Make Way for Noddy (Q 11)
  - Alice in Wonderland (Q 11)
  - Jackie and Jill (Q 11)
- October 1: Hollywood Boot Camp (Q 11)
- October 5:
  - Mga Mata ni Anghelita (GMA 7)
  - Meteor Garden (GMA 7)
  - April Kiss (Q 11)
  - Jojo A. All the Way (RJTV 29)
- October 12:
  - Natutulog Ba ang Diyos? (ABS-CBN 2)
  - Lavender (Q 11)
  - Crying Out Loud (Q 11)
- October 13:
  - U Can Dance (ABS-CBN 2)
  - Nagmamahal, Kapamilya (ABS-CBN 2)
- October 19:
  - Meteor Rain (GMA 7)
  - Jumong (GMA 7)
  - Prudence Investigations (Q 11)
- October 20:
  - KSP: Kapamilya Sabado Party (ABS-CBN TV-4 Davao)
  - Sabado Barkada (ABS-CBN TV-4 Bacolod)
- October 26:
  - Lovers in Prague (Q 11)
  - Seniorita Mei Mei (Q 11)
  - My MVP Valentine (Q 11)
  - My 19 Year Old Sister-in-Law (Q 11)
- October 27:
  - Komiks Presents: Pedro Penduko at ang mga Engkantao (ABS-CBN 2)
  - John en Shirley (ABS-CBN 2)
  - Mice Loves Rice (Q 11)
- November 2:
  - Eyeshield 21 (ABS-CBN 2)
  - Yakitate!! Japan (ABS-CBN 2)
- November 4:
  - Gundam SEED Destiny (ABS-CBN 2)
  - Power Rangers S.P.D. (ABS-CBN 2)
  - Inuyasha (rerun) (ABS-CBN 2)
- November 9:
  - Kokey (ABS-CBN 2)
  - Kung Mahawi Man ang Ulap (GMA 7)
- November 10: Fantastic Man (GMA 7)
- November 14: Palaban (GMA 7)
- November 16:
  - Daisy Siete: Tabachingching (GMA 7)
  - Grimm's Fairy Tales (Q 11)
  - Saiyuki Reload (Q 11)
- November 23:
  - Guardian Angel (Q 11)
  - Martin Mystery (Q 11)
- November 30:
  - Love Story of a Star (Q 11)
  - Love Generation (Q 11)
  - The 100th Bride (Q 11)
  - The Wizard of Oz (Q 11)
  - Long Vacation (Q 11)
  - Vision of Escaflowne (Q 11)
- December 7:
  - Pangarap na Bituin (ABS-CBN 2)
  - Only You (Q 11)
  - Sabrina's Secret Life (Q 11)
  - The Jungle Book (Q 11)
- December 14:
  - Couple or Trouble (GMA 7)
  - Meteor Garden II (GMA 7)
  - Kung Fu Soccer (Q 11)
- December 15: Super Inggo 1.5: Ang Bagong Bangis (ABS-CBN 2)
- December 17: Survivor: China (RPN 9)
- December 21:
  - Princess Sarah (ABS-CBN 2)
  - A Farewall to Sorrow (Q 11)
  - Reaching for the Stars (Q 11)
  - Beautiful Life (Q 11)
- December 23: Love Story in Harvard (Q 11)
- December 24:
  - Buhay Pinoy (RPN 9)
  - Go Negosyo Bigtime (RPN 9)
- December 25:
  - Cerge for Truth (RPN 9)
  - Going Public (RPN 9)
- December 26:
  - Golf Power Plus (RPN 9)
  - K Na Tayo! (RPN 9)
- December 27:
  - Magpakailanman (GMA 7)
  - The Police Hour (RPN 9)
- December 28:
  - Kabarkada, Break the Bank (Studio 23)
  - Merry Morning Cartoons (ABS-CBN 2)
  - Hwang Jini (GMA 7)
  - Dee's Day (RPN 9)
  - Insight Inside (RPN 9)
  - Signs and Wonders (RPN 9)
  - Morning! Umaga Na! (SBN 21)
  - Afternoon Talk (SBN 21)
  - Philippine Network News (SBN 21)
- December 29:
  - Asin at Ilaw (RPN 9)
  - Gameplan (RPN 9)
  - Sabado Boys (RPN 9)
  - Sargo (RPN 9)
  - Saturday Night Playhouse (RPN 9)
  - Sharing in the City (RPN 9)
  - Talk Toons (RPN 9)
  - Youth Alive (RPN 9)
  - Barangay Unting for Chess (SBN 21)
  - Usapang Legal with Willie (SBN 21)
- December 30:
  - Family Rosary Crusade (RPN 9)
  - Heart to Heart Talk (RPN 9)
  - Last Full Show (RPN 9)
  - Sunday Mass (RPN 9)
  - Oras ng Himala (SBN 21)
  - Oras ng Katotohanan (SBN 21)
  - Celebrity Night of Dance and Music (SBN 21)

=== Unknown dates ===
- January: Milyonaryong Mini (ABS-CBN 2)
- June: NBA Jam (RPN 9 and Basketball TV)
- July: Stars on Ice (Q 11)
- September: iPBA (ABC 5)
- October: At Your Service-Star Power (Q 11)
- December: Buhay Pelota (SBN 21)
- December: Buhay Pinoy (SBN 21)

=== Unknown ===
- Mr. Bean (ABS-CBN 2)
- Salam (ABS-CBN 2)
- Yes to Christmas (ABS-CBN 2)
- Just Joking (GMA 7)
- Coca-Cola's Ride to Fame: Yes! to Your Dreams (GMA 7)
- Bongga Ka Star (Q 11)
- Gabe Me a Break (Q 11)
- Iba Na ang Matalino: The Nutroplex Brain Challenge (Q 11)
- Lovelife (Q 11)
- Masigasig (Q 11)
- Michelle Simone's Entertains (Q 11)
- Sports Desk (Solar Sports)
- Gimme a Break! (RJTV 29)
- Kaibigan (RJTV 29)
- New Generation (RJTV 29)
- Oras ng Katotohanan (RJTV 29)
- Pinoy Box Office (RJTV 29)
- Saturday Night Live with Jorel Tan (RJTV 29)
- The Chaplet of the Divine Mercy (RJTV 29)
- Wednesday Underground (RJTV 29)
- Home Shopping Network (SBN 21)
- Jesus: Lord of the Nations (SBN 21)
- Kerygma TV (SBN 21)
- Friends Again (SBN 21)
- SBN Music Videos (SBN 21)
- The Insider (ETC)
- Starting Over (ETC)
- Krusada Kontra Krimen (NBN 4, RPN 9 and IBC 13)
- Ano Ba'ng Hanap Mo (IBC 13)
- A Taste of Life with Heny Sison (IBC 13)
- AM @ IBC (IBC 13)
- Friends Again (IBC 13)
- Linawin Natin (IBC 13)
- Liwanagin Natin (Net 25)
- Agila Reports (Net 25)
- Ang Mga Nagsialis sa Samahang ang Dating Daan (Net 25)
- Ilaw ng Kaligtasan (Net 25)
- Openline (Net 25)
- Thanksgiving Day (UNTV 37)
- Ating Alamin (ABC 5)
- Ali! (ABC 5)
- Comedy Bites (ABC 5)
- Frontlines (ABC 5)
- Global Shockers (ABC 5)
- Gourmet Everyday (ABC 5)
- Hayop Na Hayop (ABC 5)
- Healthline (ABC 5)
- Kids TV (ABC 5)
- KNN: Kabataan News Network (ABC 5, NBN 4)
- Metro (ABC 5)
- Premyo sa Resibo (ABC 5)
- Real Stories kasama si Loren Legarda (ABC 5)
- Ripley's Believe It Or Not: Philippine Edition (ABC 5)
- Slingo (ABC 5)
- Tahanang Pinoy (ABC 5)
- Today's Moms (ABC 5)
- Ultimate Guinness World Records Pinoy Edition (ABC 5)
- Global Guts (ABC 5)
- Guinness World Records (ABC 5)
- Hey Arnold! (ABC 5)
- Lizzie McGuire (ABC 5)
- The Wild Thornberrys (ABC 5)
- Worst-Case Scenarios (ABC 5)
- Ang Pangarap Kong Jackpot (RPN 9)
- Auto Extreme (RPN 9)
- Body & Machine (RPN 9)
- Dalawang Tisoy (RPN 9)
- Extreme Games 101 (RPN 9)
- EZ Shop (RPN 9)
- Fistorama (RPN 9)
- Friends Again (RPN 9)
- Go Negosyo (RPN 9)
- Ikaw at ang Batas (RPN 9)
- In This Corner (RPN 9)
- Jesus I Trust In You (RPN 9)
- Just for Laughs Gags (RPN 9)
- Kalusugan TV (RPN 9)
- Kapihan ng Bayan (RPN 9)
- Ke-Mis: Kay Misis Umaasa (RPN 9)
- Kerygma TV (RPN 9)
- Makabayang Doktor (RPN 9)
- Make-Over (RPN 9)
- Man & Machine (RPN 9)
- May Liwanag (RPN 9)
- One Night with an Angel (RPN 9)
- Parenting 101 (RPN 9)
- Pinokyo at ang Blue Fairy (RPN 9)
- Sabi ni Nanay (RPN 9)
- Single Girls (RPN 9)
- The Basketball Show (RPN 9)
- The Chaplet Of The Divine Mercy (RPN 9)
- The Power to Unite (RPN 9)
- Value Vision (RPN 9)
- W.O.W.: What's On Weekend (RPN 9)
- Winner TV Shopping (RPN 9)
- Business & Leisure (NBN 4)
- Divine Mercy Live TV Mass (NBN 4)
- Speed by MP Turbo (NBN 4)
- The Sports List (NBN 4)
- Youth Voice (NBN 4)

== Births ==
- January 13 - Ashley Sarmiento, actress
- February 12 – Esang de Torres, singer
- April 19 – Bimby Aquino Yap, actor and TV-media personality (son of James Yap and Kris Aquino)
- August 1 – Marco Masa, child actor
- September 12 - Arvery Love Lagoring, singer
- September 28 – Cessa Moncera, actress
- November 8 – Lauren King
- December 10 – Zyren Dela Cruz, actor

== Deaths ==
- March 16: Joey Gosiengfiao, film director (born 1941)
- April 7: Ogie Juliano, theater director (born 1961)
- May 18: Yoyoy Villame, singer and comedian (born 1938)
- August 9: Pete Roa, television host (born 1940)
- August 27: Ramon Zamora, actor (born 1935)
- November 15: Emoy Gorgonia, former TV host "Tukaan" (born 1962)
- November 16: Ross Rival a.k.a. Rosauro Salvador, action film actor and father of actress Maja Salvador (born 1945)
- December 5: Rene Villanueva, creator and head writer of Batibot (born 1954)
- December 15: Ace Vergel, film actor (born 1952)

== Networks ==
=== Launches ===
- February 12: Central Luzon Television 36 High Definition
- March 12: DZMM TeleRadyo
- August 13: TV Maria
- October 1: RHTV

==== Unknown (dates) ====
- SineBox

== See also ==
- 2007 in television
