= Front Line (CRI) =

Chinese English-language radio program

Front Line is a weekly English radio program produced by China Radio International discussing about life in modern China. The flavor of the program is much like NPR's Morning Edition and All Things Considered. The program combines news, analysis, commentary, interviews, and special features, but from a Chinese perspective.

The program airs on Round the Clock and is available on the podcasts through the World Radio Network on the Monday edition in the United States, Tuesday edition in Beijing.

The host of Front Line is Wu Jia.

== Examples of topics discussed ==
=== Beauty Salon Scam ===
In October 2006, Front Line discussed about how a woman was scammed into buying skin treatment from a beauty salon that claimed that the treatment will permanently make her look younger. The treatment turned out to be a stem cell injection that caused many problems for the buyer. The problems amounted to huge spots on her face accompanied by serious itching. At first she did not think the problems were caused by the treatment until many months later. Eventually after countless doctors visits, the woman eventually traced the problem back to the beauty salon. The woman did receive compensation. However, the consequences of the treatment cannot be erased.

(Source: Listened live from China Radio International on WNWR in Philadelphia during a Monday broadcast)

=== Mice Love Rice Scandal ===
Sometime in the middle of 2006, Front Line discussed about how Yang Chengang came into trouble with the copyright holders of a song he wrote that became an instant hit throughout Asia. Yang Chengang was a school teacher in China and the artist of the popular song "Mice Love Rice". In the mid-1990s, he sold the copyright of the song to Emperor Entertainment Group and then later signed another agreement with another record label. When the second record label distributed his song, the original copyright holder Emperor Entertainment Group sued the other record label only to find out that Yang Chengang was the one who double sold the song.

(Source: Listened live from China Radio International on WNWR in Philadelphia during a Monday broadcast)

=== Garbage Collector raises Four Orphaned Daughters ===
In another October 2006 program, Front Line discussed how a garbage collector found 4 abandoned baby girls. The story was a touching story of how this person spent all of his savings to feed these children. In the end, his neighbors noticed this person and donated some personals for his cause. This influenced the decision of the orphan center to not take custody of the four girls, but rather make an exception to the rule by providing money and food to support them.

(Source: Listened live from China Radio International on WNWR in Philadelphia during a Monday broadcast)

== Other topics discussed ==
- Taiwan Issues
- European Union Anti Dumping Policy
- Qinghai Tibet Railroad
- Social Issues
