= Trevor Metz =

Canadian journalist & radio broadcaster (born 1972)

- Born: February 10, 1972 (age 53); New Westminster, British Columbia, Canada
- Occupation(s): Radio broadcaster Journalist
- Spouse: Liu Jing (m. 2007)
- Children: 2
- Parents: Edward Metz (father); Sheila Metz (mother)

Trevor Metz (born February 10, 1972) is a Canadian journalist, documentary narrator, radio talk show host, and columnist. He lives in Beijing, China.

He was born in New Westminster, British Columbia to mother Shelia Metz and father Edward "Ted" Metz.

Metz started his broadcasting career on the cable TV program "Daytime" which is now called Urban Rush. He started with technical and camera work before moving into reporting. He left the show when he was accepted to the British Columbia Institute of Technology's Broadcast Journalism Program, leaving BCIT in his final semester to take a job at CHNL in Kamloops, British Columbia. It was there he was part of the news team that won a Jack Webster Award for Excellence in Radio for his coverage of the infamous double murder suicide at the Ministry of Water, Land, and Air Protection during a time of unprecedented government cutbacks. After two years in Kamloops radio he took a job at CKPG/CKPG-TV in Prince George, British Columbia doing both radio and television. He left CKPG after two years to take a job with China Radio International in Beijing.

He is the narrator for "Discover China" broadcast in the United States on both the Dish Network and Direct TV to over 40 million American homes. Discover China is the first documentary TV series to be shot in HDTV in China. It airs to over 800 million people in China and is the first Chinese television series to be aired simultaneously in the United States.

He is the co-creator and former host of China Drive airing on China Radio International. China Drive is broadcast to millions of people across China and re-broadcast to several major markets around the globe. Segments included "Cooking with Chef Dan Segall", "Trevor Metz's Song of the Day", "Steve The Useless Fact Guy", and "Trevor Metz's Movie Review".

During the 2008 Beijing Olympic Games he led CRI's English broadcast team from the International Broadcast Center. He was also the first foreigner to broadcast live from the Great Hall of the People in Beijing to the domestic Chinese audience during a speech from President Hu Jintao.

He is also a voice artist in Beijing. He is the president and lead talent of China Voice Over. His voice can be heard on both China Eastern Airlines and China Southern Airlines as the onboard safety announcer. His voice can be heard on several commercials and corporate video productions. He is also the narrator of "China's Treasures" that first aired in 2008, and continues to air on China Central Television's international channel, CCTV9, across China and in several major markets around the world.

He is also a columnist with the Canadian Broadcasting Corporation. His articles appear on the CBC's Viewpoint and he has been published in the Elite Reference, and the Prince George Citizen.

He was married to Chinese national Liu Jing in Wuhan, Hubei Province China on April 25, 2007, with whom he has a daughter, and he also has a child from a previous relationship.
