= Round the Clock (radio station) =

English internet radio service from China Radio International

Round The Clock is an English internet radio service from China Radio International. The broadcast basically rotates between China Drive and the following weekly programs:

- Monday: Front Line
- Tuesday: Biz-China
- Wednesday: China Horizons
- Thursday: Voices from Other Lands
- Friday: Life In China
- Saturday: Listeners' Garden
- Sunday: In the Spotlight

(Source: http://en.chinabroadcast.cn/radio/schedule/radio_roundtheclock.htm)

On the weekends when China Drive is not available, the following programs are also broadcast:

- CRI Roundup
- China Roots
- Reports from Developing Counties
- China Beat
