= Life in China =

Chinese English-language radio program

Life In China is a weekly English radio program produced by China Radio International that features articles about ordinary people in China. The show is hosted by Shan Shan. The program airs on Round the Clock and is available on the podcasts through the World Radio Network on the Friday edition in the United States, Saturday edition in Beijing. The format of the program is similar to NPR's Morning Edition and All Things Considered in that they commentate on the news and events of today and put them into perspective with ordinary people.

The program's format takes the perspective of the ordinary Chinese citizen and creates a story out of the ordinary day-to-day routine. For example, there was a report by high school students done on internet addiction and what happened when a town decided to enforce a curfew that shut down internet cafes in that town after 10 PM.
