= CMG =

CMG may refer to:

== Companies ==
- Capitol Music Group, a music label
- China Media Group, the predominant state radio and television broadcaster in the PRC
- China Media Group Co., Ltd., former name of Huawen Group
- China Merchants Group, a state-owned enterprise of China
- Chipotle Mexican Grill, NYSE ticker symbol
- Cinema Management Group, film sales company
- CMG (company), a telecommunications and IT consultancy company
- Collective Music Group, an American hip hop record label founded by Yo Gotti
- Computer Measurement Group, a worldwide non-profit organization of data processing professionals
- Computer Modelling Group, a producer of reservoir simulation software
- Concord Music Group, American independent music publisher
- Cox Media Group, a broadcasting, publishing, direct marketing, digital media company
- EMI CMG (EMI Christian Music Group), a music label

== Other ==
- California Men's Gatherings, an organization supporting the anti-sexist men's movement
- Castor Moving Group, a moving group of stars sharing similar velocities
- Companion of the Order of St Michael and St George, a British and Commonwealth honour
- Control moment gyroscope, attitude control device used on spacecraft
- Corumbá International Airport (IATA airport code), Corumbá, Brazil
- Curaçao, Sint Maarten guilder (CMg), former proposed name for the Caribbean guilder
