= Elyse Ribbons =

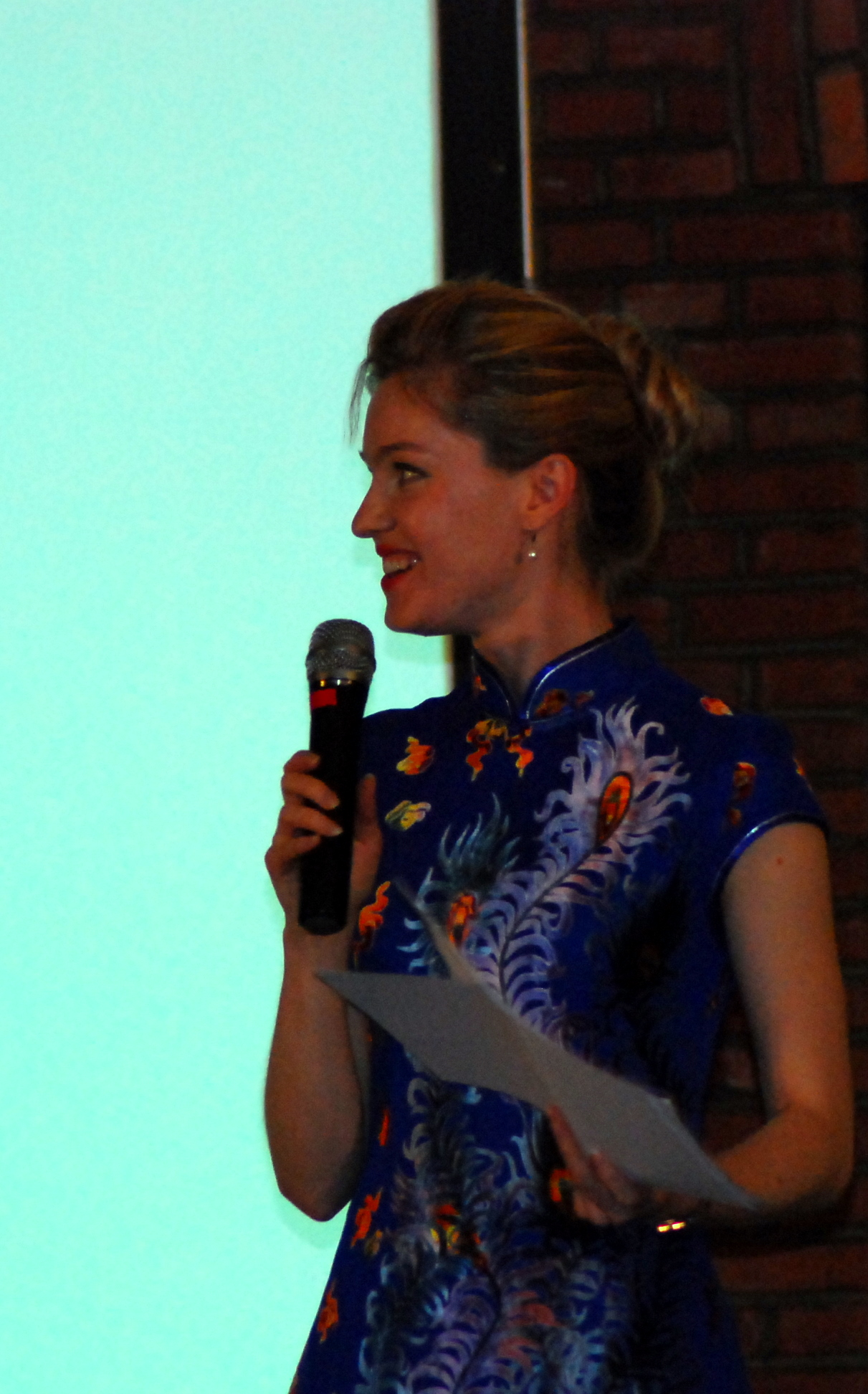
Elyse Ribbons at TEDxBeijing 2009

Elyse Ribbons (born October 27, 1980) is an American entrepreneur, writer, businesswoman, and playwright who lives and works in Beijing, known in China by her Chinese name Liu Suying (Chinese: 柳素英). She spends time on both corporate and media work (via newspaper columns, a nationally syndicated radio show on China Radio International, regular news media appearances and filming movies), and is the founder and currently the CEO of GeiLi Giving, the winner of several awards in the startup and social entrepreneurial space. She has authored several articles for Forbes magazine on business, culture, and life in China.

Born in Detroit, Michigan and raised in North Carolina, Ribbons has earned degrees and certificates from UNC-Chapel Hill, Communications University of China, Stanford Graduate School of Business and most recently an MFA in Peking Opera from the National Academy of Chinese Theatre Arts in Beijing. She previously worked for the US Embassy in China, and has worked as the COO and a board member of Pacific Construction Group, China's largest private construction company. She also created a theater company based in Beijing called Cheeky Monkey Theater in 2007, which produced original works 5 or 6 times a year. Performances include I Heart Beijing and Green Eyes on China. Ribbons also created and produced the annual Shifen (10-minute) Theater Festival in China's capital city, featuring productions lasting anywhere from 15 to 45 minutes long.

Ribbons has appeared in local magazines and newspapers and Chinese television programs, and can be recognized from pictures depicting the 2008 Summer Olympics. She also starred as Helen Foster Snow in a television series based on Red Star Over China, which aired on Hunan TV in 2016.
