= Xiang Xiang (singer) =

Chinese singer

Xiang Xiang 香香
- Birth name: 王瑾玫 (pinyin: Wáng Jǐnméi)
- Born: June 14, 1984 (age 40)
- Origin: Hunan, China
- Genres: Pop
- Occupation: Singer
- Years active: 2004–present
- Website: www.xxmusic.net

Xiang Xiang (Chinese: 香香; pinyin: Xiāng Xiāng; born June 14, 1984) is a Chinese singer. She was reportedly the most popular internet celebrity in China in 2005. Her birth name is Wang Jinmei (Chinese: 王瑾玫; pinyin: Wáng Jǐnméi).

She is perhaps most famous for her song "Song of Pig" (猪之歌), the title track of her first solo album.

Xiang Xiang is also known for remaking the song, Mice Love Rice (老鼠爱大米; Lao Shu Ai Da Mi; by Yang Chengang), turning it into a hit on the Internet.

== Discography ==
=== Albums ===
- Song of Pig, February 2005
- Xiang Xiang Wang Lu Xiao Gong Zhu Ai Yo Ai Yo Dui Bu Qi, October 2005
- Sorry, October 2005
- Gong Zhu Ri Ji, December 2005
- Healthy Happy Action, May 2006
- Seam Love, June 2006
- Fate New + Best Selection
