= 93.0 FM =

FM radio frequency

93.0 FM (93.0 MHz on the FM dial) is a frequency used by multiple radio stations worldwide. Notable stations broadcasting on 93.0 FM include:

== Bosnia and Herzegovina ==
- Radio Studio M in Doboj

== Bulgaria ==
- N-Joy in Velingrad

== China ==
- The Voice of China in Huizhou

== Democratic Republic of the Congo ==
- Radio Okapi in Gbadolite and Kananga

== Israel ==
- Kol Chai in Central Israel

== Japan ==
- Nippon Broadcasting System in Tokyo
- Shikoku Broadcasting

== Laos ==
- CRI Vientiane in Vientiane

== Malaysia ==
- Hitz (radio station), Malacca and northern Johor

== Netherlands ==
- Radio 10 in Westdorpe

== New Zealand ==
- The Edge in Manawatū District

== Portugal ==
- M80 Radio in Leiria

== South Africa ==
- Metro FM

== Sri Lanka ==
- Gold FM in Colombo

== United Kingdom ==
- BBC Radio 4 in Berwick-upon-Tweed

== See also ==
- 93 FM – stations identifying as 93 on the FM dial, which may not be exactly 93.0 MHz
