= CRI Vientiane =

CRI Vientiane at 93.0 FM is a radio station in Vientiane, Laos. It is part of China Radio International. It broadcasts primarily in English. According to China Radio International, this is the third overseas radio station launch after CRI Nairobi Kenya 91.9 FM.
