= Song of Pig =

Song performed by Xiang Xiang

Song by Xiang Xiang

from the album Song of Pig
- Language: Mandarin
- Released: January 25, 2005
- Genre: Mandopop
- Length: 3:22
- Label: Feiyue Music
- Songwriter: Mao Hui

"Song of Pig" (Chinese: 豬之歌) is a freely downloadable song by Xiang Xiang (香香), who quickly became a popular Internet pop star in China. According to one of its hosted sites, it has been downloaded a billion times (see BBC article: "Chinese pop idol thrives online") throughout China, Singapore, and Malaysia. The song's lyrics describe a pig. It is the title track of Xiang Xiang's first solo album.
