= Thanh Thảo (singer) =

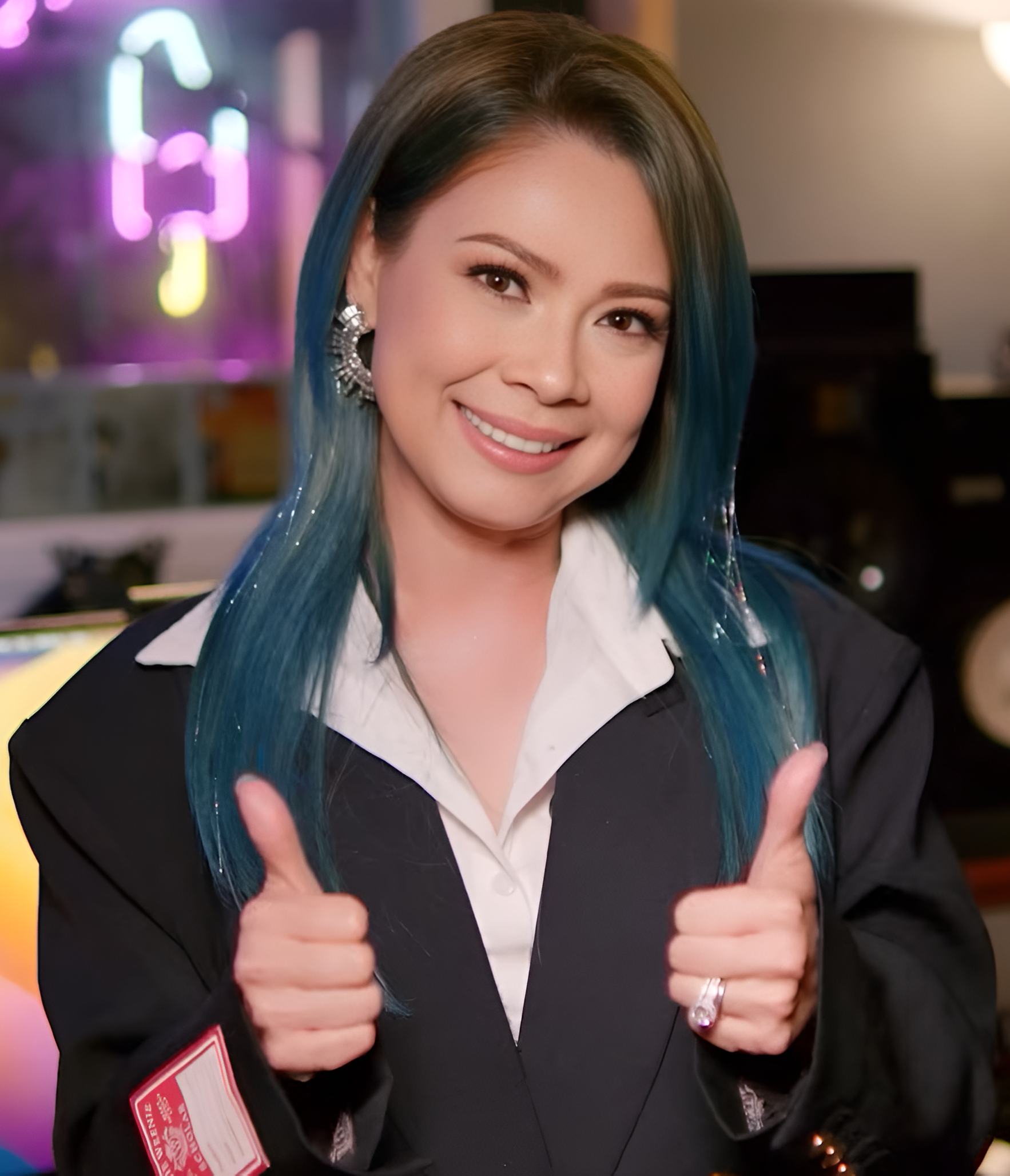
- Thanh Thảo in 2024

Background information
- Born: Phạm Trịnh Phương Thảo; 8 March 1977 (age 49)
- Origin: Ho Chi Minh City, Vietnam
- Genre: Pop
- Occupations: Singer
- Instruments: Singing

Phạm Trịnh Phương Thảo, also known by the stage name Thanh Thảo (8 March 1977), is a female Vietnamese singer and actress. Her best known song is Búp bê đẹp xinh (The Beautiful Doll) 2002. Her stage name Thanh Thao was chosen so as to not be mistaken with singer Phuong Thao. Beside being a singer, she used to be the chairman of Music Box Entertainment managing Tu Minh Huy, Ngo Kien Huy, Ngan Khanh, Nam Cuong, Justin Nguyen, Gia Han, Sa Khang, P&P band, Thuy Anh etc. After the law court with Thuy Vinh, in April 2011 she established new company named Thanh Thao Production. BE A STAR was a new product to search for new talents, like Ngo Kien Huy who was discovered in Vuon Toi Ngoi Sao produced by Music Box previously.

== Family background ==
Thanh Thao was born in Ho Chi Minh City.

Starting in secondary school, every summer break, she always searched for job to help her parents. When in Hung Vuong High School, she exposed her singing talent through many activities.

Her sibling is Thuy Anh who is also a singer.

== Career ==
=== Debut ===
When she was young, she already dreamed of performing on stage. On first days of her career, she was assisted by songwriter Duc Tri devotedly, then Phuong Uyen, Le Quang and Nguyen Ha,...

In 1998 she became well known when signing a contract with Rang Dong Studio Center through the introduction of singer Ngoc Son. However, it wasn't until the performance of "Oi Tinh Yeu" and other songs translated from Thai version of China Dolls girl band, her position moved higher. Later, she gained much success for "Khoc Cho Yeu Thuong" which was translated from Korean song "Run To You" of DJ Doc, "Thien Than Bong Dem" from "Heaven" of Groove Coverage.

=== "Doll" trademark ===
In 2002, her new chapter was opened with the release of new album Bup Be Xinh Dep with the head single was composed by Phuong Uyen. Not only to prove herself in dance genre, the success of the album was also the beginning of Bup Be (Doll) image that later stick along with her for further projects such as: Bup Be Biet Yeu, Bup Be Khong Tinh Yeu, Bup Be Happy, Bup Be Con Trai, Bup Be Buon.

=== Musicbox ===
In July 2007, along with former model and national athletic Thuy Vinh, they established an agency named Music Box. Many singers were discovered from this agency such as: Tu Minh Huy, Ngo Kien Huy, Ngan Khanh, Nam Cuong,...

=== TV host of The Voice Kid Vietnam ===
She was the TV host of The Voice Kid Vietnam in its first season.

== Scandal ==
=== Conflict with Hien Thuc ===
The conflict was officially clarified as her manager at the time, Trinh Tu Trung, accused Thanh Thao for exclusively buying the copyright of two songs while Hien Thuc had finished recording them and about to release the album. This put her into financial crisis.

However, according to the only statement from Thanh Thao in which she denied it, as she said that whether it was right or wrong, the composer of these songs, Phuong Uyen, should be the one to clarify. When Hien Thuc announced the release of Co Don Minh Em also caused Thanh Thao some problems but she let it pass. Thanh Thao also stated that anyone can perform this song as long as they asked for permission, something Hien Thuc did not do.

In 2009, Hien Thuc performed in live show of Han Thai Tu which was produced by Music Box Agency of Thanh Thao. However, their relationship was still not friendly. In 2011, Thanh Thao invited her to perform at the show Ngan Sao Hoi Tu and their relationship improved since.

=== Conflict with Truong Quynh Anh ===
Truong Quynh Anh was a singer and actress under Music Box as she was thought to be exclusive singer of Music Box but due to some disagreement of the contract, later she left Music Box. She continued to pursue her own path thank to the assistance of songwriter Vu Quoc Binh. During this time, she also performed the song Don Coi at many music shows while this song was included in the album of Thanh Thao's younger sister, Thuy Anh. In the midst of conflict, Truong Quynh Anh's family released the record of phone call with Thanh Thao who had threatened Truong Quynh Anh. Thanh Thao later publicly apologized for being too frank and angry. However, she also said it's not a good intention from Truong Quynh Anh when they had planned to record the phone call.

Shortly afterward, Truong Quynh Anh continued to expose that Thanh Thao was trying to get rid of her at some projects. However, Hoang Tuan (Dan Truong's manager) and Nhac Xanh's director denied that it had anything to do with Thanh Thao. Thanh Thao also reconfirmed the incident again and asked Truong Quynh Anh to stop using her name.

== Albums ==
- song Chuột yêu gạo Vietnamese version of Mice Love Rice
