= China Drive =

Chinese radio show

China Drive is the only daily bi-lingual news and lifestyle radio show in China. It is broadcast seven days a week, 5–7 pm Beijing time on China Radio International and focusses on life in China. The programme has four main presenters.

== On Air Personalities ==
=== Monday to Wednesday ===
- Mark Griffiths
- Yan Yinan

=== Thursday and Friday ===
- Mark Griffiths
- Ning Yan

=== Saturday and Sunday ===
- Yan Yinan
- John Artman

== Format of the show ==
- Hang Out Feature (A reporter, or one of the show's presenters goes to a location in Beijing and does a short report on what's there for visitors to see.)
- Business-related report
- Media Scan - a review of the day's foreign and Chinese newspapers and media websites
- Movie Review with Zhao Kun
- Science & Technology Feature with Li Dong
- This Is IT - fashion feature with Shen Si
- Roundtable Discussion - every Friday an important issue is discussed in depth

== Team of Reporters for China Drive ==
Original Team

- Yan Yinan, Host
- Chris Verrill, Host/Producer
- James West, Business

Ongoing

- Li Dong (Michael Li)
- Liu Min
- Wangjing
- Shen Si

== Former Team Members ==
Chris Verrill Verrill was the first producer and co-host of China Drive. He spent only one year at CRI. He later launched Beijing Playhouse, China's English Broadway Theatre, www.beijingplayhouse.com

- James West - Executive Producer of Hack on Triple J

Trevor Metz Trevor was the co-creator and former afternoon host of Real Time Beijing--a sister program to China Drive. He spent four years with CRI. He left the show to narrate the documentary series Discover China on 5CTV https://web.archive.org/web/20090209090658/http://5ctv.tv/

== History ==
China Drive first broadcast on CRI on December 1, 2005. It was hosted by Yan Yinan and Chris Verrill.

China Drive broadcast weekdays 5 pm to 7 pm. It replaced and combined four different half hour shows that were on the air at 5 pm, 5:30 pm 6 pm, and 6:30 pm. The show was a lighthearted features magazine.

== Program Distribution ==
=== Webcast ===
http://english.cri.cn/4026/more/4163/more4163.htm

China Drive first broadcast on CRI on December 1, 2005. It was originally hosted by Yan Yinan and Chris Verrill.

=== In China ===
- 87.9 MHz FM in Shanghai
- Easy FM on 91.5 MHz FM in Beijing
- 104.7 MHz FM in Guangzhou

=== In the United States ===
- WNWR on 1540 kHz AM in Philadelphia
- WUST on 1120 kHz AM in Washington, DC

=== In Europe ===
- 1440 kHz AM via Marnach, Luxembourg covering most of Europe
- 558 kHz across the UK. The morning edition of the show is re-broadcast 9-10 pm the day of original transmission. The afternoon edition is aired between 3 pm and 5 pm the following day.
