= 93 FM =

Radio stations identifying as FM 93, 93 FM, or 93 on the FM dial, include:

- FM 93, a station of Radio Pakistan
- Kol Chai (FM 93.0 MHz), Bnei Brak, Israel
- C93FM (FM 92.9 MHz), Christchurch, New Zealand
- WWFF-FM (FM 93.3 MHz) (formerly "US 93 FM" and "The New Power 93 FM"), Alabama, U.S.
- KKBQ-FM (FM 92.9 MHz) ("The New 93Q"), Pasadena, Texas, U.S.

== See also ==
- 93.0 FM, for stations located at 93.0 MHz on the FM dial
