= Stars on Ice (Philippine TV series) =

2007 Philippine television reality show

- Genre: Reality competition
- Presented by: Arnell Ignacio
- Country of origin: Philippines
- Original language: Tagalog

Production
- Production locations: SM Mall of Asia, Pasay, Philippines
- Camera setup: Multiple-camera setup
- Running time: 60 minutes

Original release
- Network: Q
- Release: March 20, 2007 – July 2007

Stars on Ice is a 2007 Philippine television reality show broadcast by Q. A figure skating ice dancing competition featuring Filipino celebrities. Hosted by Arnell Ignacio, it premiered on March 20, 2007. The show concluded in July 2007.

== Cast ==
- Arnell Ignacio
- Victor Basa
- Say Alonzo
