= 2007 Shakey's V-League season =

2007 SVL season
- League: Shakey's V-League
- Sport: Volleyball
- TV partner(s): NBN-4

1st Conference
- Season champions: UST Tigresses
- Runners-up: San Sebastian Lady Stags
- Season MVP: (Thailand) Jaroensri Bualee (SSC-R)

2nd Conference
- Season champions: UST Tigresses
- Runners-up: San Sebastian Lady Stags
- Season MVP: (Thailand) Lithawat Kesinee (Ateneo)

Seasons
- ← 2006, 3rd 5th, 2008 →

The 2007 Shakey's V-League (SVL) season was the fourth season of the Shakey's V-League.

== 1st conference ==
The Shakey's V-League 4th Season 1st Conference was the 5th conference of the Shakey's V-League. The tournament was held from May 2007 until July 2007.

=== Participating teams ===
Abbr.	Team
ADM	Ateneo de Manila University Lady Eagles
ADU	Adamson University Lady Falcons
CSL	Colegio de San Juan de Letran Lady Knights
DLS	De La Salle University Lady Archers
FEU	Far Eastern University Lady Tamaraws
LPU	Lyceum of the Philippines University Lady Pirates
SSC	San Sebastian College–Recoletos Lady Stags
UST	University of Santo Tomas Tigresses

=== Finals ===
- All times are in Philippines Standard Time (UTC+08:00)

3rd place

Date	Time	Teams	Set	1	2	3	4	5	Total	Report
Jul 1	14:00	Lyceum Lady Pirates	3	25	25	25			75	
Jul 1	14:00	De La Salle Lady Archers	0	19	23	19			61	

Championship

Date	Time	Teams	Set	1	2	3	4	5	Total	Report
Jul 1	17:00	UST Tigresses	3	25	25	25			75	
Jul 1	17:00	San Sebastian Lady Stags	1	17	12	17			46	
Jul 3	17:00	UST Tigresses	3	25	25	17	25		92	
Jul 3	17:00	San Sebastian Lady Stags	1	14	19	25	13		71	

=== Final standings ===
Rank	Team	Ref.
1st place, gold medalist(s)	University of Santo Tomas	
2nd place, silver medalist(s)	San Sebastian College–Recoletos	
3rd place, bronze medalist(s)	Lyceum of the Philippines University	
4	De La Salle University	
5	Ateneo de Manila University	
6	Adamson University	
7	Far Eastern University	
8	Colegio de San Juan de Letran	

=== Individual awards ===
Award		Name	Ref.
Most Valuable Player	Finals: Conference:	(Philippines) Mary Jean Balse ( UST) (Thailand) Jaroensri Bualee ( San Sebastian)	
Best Scorer		(Thailand) Jaroensri Bualee ( San Sebastian)	
Best Attacker		(Philippines) Mary Jean Balse ( UST)	
Best Blocker		(Philippines) Michelle Laborte ( Ateneo)	
Best Server		(Philippines) Karla Bello ( Ateneo)	
Best Setter		(Philippines) Ma. Teresa Iratay ( San Sebastian)	
Best Digger		(Philippines) Margarita Pepito ( San Sebastian)	
Best Receiver		(Philippines) Shella Marga ( Lyceum)	

== 2nd conference ==
The Shakey's V-League 4th Season 2nd Conference was the 6th conference of the Shakey's V-League.

=== Participating teams ===
Abbr.	Team	Ref.
ADM	Ateneo de Manila University Lady Eagles	
ADU	Adamson University Lady Falcons	
CSL	Colegio de San Juan de Letran Lady Knights	
DLS	De La Salle University Lady Archers	
FEU	Far Eastern University Lady Tamaraws	
LPU	Lyceum of the Philippines University Lady Pirates	
SSC	San Sebastian College–Recoletos Lady Stags	
UST	University of Santo Tomas Tigresses	

=== Semi-finals ===
Pos	Team	Pld	W	L	Pts	SW	SL	SR	SPW	SPL	SPR	Qualification
1	San Sebastian Lady Stags	4	4	0	11	12	3	4.000	362	299	1.211	Finals
2	Ateneo Lady Eagles	4	3	1	9	9	5	1.800	326	304	1.072	Finals playoff
3	UST Tigresses	4	2	2	5	7	9	0.778	376	386	0.974	Finals playoff
4	Adamson Lady Falcons	4	1	3	5	7	10	0.700	365	384	0.951	
5	De La Salle Lady Archers	4	0	4	1	4	12	0.333	328	373	0.879	

Finals play-offs

- All times are in Philippines Standard Time (UTC+08:00)

Date	Time	Teams	Set	1	2	3	4	5	Total	Report
Nov 27	17:00	UST Tigresses	3	25	25	23	25		98	
Nov 27	17:00	Ateneo Lady Eagles	1	17	23	25	19		84	

=== Finals ===
3rd place

Date	Time	Teams	Set	1	2	3	4	5	Total	Report
Nov 30	14:00	Ateneo Lady Eagles	3	14	25	25	25		89	
Nov 30	14:00	Adamson Lady Falcons	1	25	21	19	19		84	
Dec 2	14:00	Ateneo Lady Eagles	3	25	25	25			75	
Dec 2	14:00	Adamson Lady Falcons	0	23	22	23			68	

Championship

Date	Time	Teams	Set	1	2	3	4	5	Total	Report
Nov 30	16:00	San Sebastian Lady Stags	3	25	25	17	23	15	105	
Nov 30	16:00	UST Tigresses	2	16	19	25	25	13	98	
Dec 2	16:00	San Sebastian Lady Stags	0	16	15	21			52	
Dec 2	16:00	UST Tigresses	3	25	25	25			75	
Dec 4	15:00	San Sebastian Lady Stags	2	25	23	29	15	9	101	
Dec 4	15:00	UST Tigresses	3	20	25	27	25	15	112	

=== Final standings ===
Rank	Team	Ref.
1st place, gold medalist(s)	University of Santo Tomas	
2nd place, silver medalist(s)	San Sebastian College–Recoletos	
3rd place, bronze medalist(s)	Ateneo de Manila University	
4	Adamson University	
5	De La Salle University	
6	Far Eastern University	
7	Lyceum of the Philippines University	
8	Colegio de San Juan de Letran	

=== Individual awards ===
Award		Name	Ref.
Most Valuable Player	Finals: Conference:	(Philippines) Venus Bernal ( UST) (Thailand) Lithawat Kesinee ( Ateneo)	
Best Scorer		(Thailand) Lithawat Kesinee ( Ateneo)	
Best Attacker		(Thailand) Jaroensri Bualee ( San Sebastian)	
Best Blocker		(Thailand) Lithawat Kesinee ( Ateneo)	
Best Server		(Philippines) Jacqueline Alarca ( La Salle)	
Best Setter		(Philippines) Charisse Ancheta ( San Sebastian)	
Best Digger		(Philippines) Lizlee Ann Gata ( Adamson)	
Best Receiver		(Philippines) Mary Jane Pepito ( San Sebastian)	
Most Improved Player		(Philippines) Janet Serafica ( Adamson)	

== Venues ==
- The Arena, San Juan City
