= 2007 Shakey's V-League 2nd Conference =

V-League 4th Season
| Women's Finals | G1 | G2 | G3 | Wins |
|---|---|---|---|---|
| San Sebastian Lady Stags | 3 | 0 | 2 | 1 |
| UST Growling Tigresses | 2 | 3 | 3 | 2 |
- Arena(s): Filoil Flying V Arena
- Finals MVP: Venus Bernal
- Semifinalists: Ateneo Lady Eagles; Adamson Lady Falcons; De La Salle Lady Archers
- TV network(s): NBN

The 2007 Shakey's V-League 2nd Conference was the sixth conference of the Shakey's V-League and the second conference of the 2007 season. The tournament began last October 14, 2007 at The Arena in San Juan. It ended last December 4, 2007 with the University of Santo Tomas Tigresses winning yet again against the first runner-up team from the 1st conference San Sebastian College - Recoletos Lady Stags in a dramatic 5-set game 3 finals match. These resulted in a back-to-back championship winning streak for the UST Tigresses as they are the defending champions from the 1st conference.

== Tournament format ==
- Single Round Robin Tournament
- Top five teams will compete in the semi-finals
- Top two teams with the best record after the single-round robin semi-finals will advance to the finals
  - If a team won 3 out of 4 games in the semifinals, they will have a chance for a playoff berth against the second seed team for the finals
- Best of Three Championship series
  - If the battle for the gold ended in two games only, the battle for the bronze will be best of three also instead of one game.

== Starting line-ups ==
-
SEASON 4, CONFERENCE 2
| School | Setter | Middle | Open | Utility | Middle | Open | Libero |
| Adamson | Janet Serafica | Jacqueline So | Angela Benting | Jill Gustillo; Michelle Segodine | Rissa Jane Laguilles | Nerissa Bautista* | Lizlee Ann Gata |
| Ateneo | Karla Bello | Lithawat Kesinee* | Patricia Lynn Taganas; Ma. Katrina Bianca Sison | Ma. Carmina Denise Acevedo | Bea Sharmaine Pascual | Ma. Rosario Soriano | Stephanie Gabriel |
| Far Eastern | April Linor Jose; Wendyanne Semana | Ma. Josephine Cafranca | Rachelle Anne Daquis; Shaira Gonzalez; Mary Rose Cabanag | Wendy Anne Semana; Anna Camille Abanto | Mecaila Irish May Morada | Mary Anne Manalo* | Rose Anne Taganas |
| La Salle | Relea Ferina Saet | Maureen Penetrante*; Michelle Pauline Datuin | Stephanie Mercado | Ma. Carla Llaguno; Maureen Penetrante* | Jacqueline Alarca | Michelle Pauline Datuin; Ma. Carla Llaguno; Maureen Penetrante* | Manilla Santos |
| Letran | Joanna Botor-Carpio*; Lionita Germina | Rozanne Fajardo | Cindy Optana | Gena Keeshid Andaya; Marinel Carolino* | Joy Gazelle Cases | Bangladesh Pantaleon | Kriszelle Moralejo |
| Lyceum | Bernadette Satsatin | Beverly Boto | Jane Kathleen Jarin | Estrelita Enriquez | Joana Marie Fernando | Sherilyn Carillo | Joanna Marie De La Pena |
| San Sebastian | Charisse Vernon Ancheta | Melissa Mirasol | Jaroensri Bualee* | Jinni Mondejar | Rysabelle Devanadera | Laurence Ann Latigay | Mary Jane Pepito |
| Santo Tomas | Denise Patricia Tan | Mary Jean Balse | Maria Angeli Tabaquero | Aiza Maizo; Joanna Marie Torrijos | Suzanne Roces* | Venus Bernal | Kimberly Lazaro |

== Elimination round ==
START OF ELIMINATIONS
| TIME | OCTOBER 14 - THE ARENA, SAN JUAN | | | | | | |
| TIME | Team | 1st | 2nd | 3rd | 4th | 5th | Best Player |
| 3 PM | Adamson University | 25 | 25 | 27 | - | - | Rissa Jane Laguilles |
| 3 PM | Far Eastern University | 23 | 21 | 25 | - | - | Rachel Anne Daquis |
| 5 PM | De La Salle University-Manila | 15 | 22 | 11 | - | - | Stephanie Mercado |
| 5 PM | University of Santo Tomas | 25 | 25 | 25 | - | - | Venus Bernal |
| TIME | OCTOBER 16 - THE ARENA, SAN JUAN | | | | | | |
| TIME | Team | 1st | 2nd | 3rd | 4th | 5th | Best Player |
| 3 PM | Lyceum of the Philippines University | 18 | 22 | 13 | - | - | Sherilyn Carillo |
| 3 PM | Adamson University | 25 | 25 | 25 | - | - | Janet Serafica |
| 5 PM | Colegio de San Juan de Letran | 18 | 13 | 12 | - | - | Bangladesh Pantaleon |
| 5 PM | De La Salle University-Manila | 25 | 25 | 25 | - | - | Maureen Penetrante |
| TIME | OCTOBER 19 - THE ARENA, SAN JUAN | | | | | | |
| TIME | Team | 1st | 2nd | 3rd | 4th | 5th | Best Player |
| 3 PM | Adamson University | 20 | 18 | 14 | - | - | Nerissa Bautista |
| 3 PM | San Sebastian College - Recoletos | 25 | 25 | 25 | - | - | Laurence Anne Latigay |
| 5 PM | Colegio de San Juan de Letran | 18 | 21 | 15 | - | - | Bangladesh Pantaleon |
| 5 PM | Far Eastern University | 25 | 25 | 25 | - | - | Rachel Anne Daquis |
| TIME | OCTOBER 21 - THE ARENA, SAN JUAN | | | | | | |
| TIME | Team | 1st | 2nd | 3rd | 4th | 5th | Best Player |
| 3 PM | University of Santo Tomas | 25 | 22 | 25 | 19 | 6 | Venus Bernal |
| 3 PM | Ateneo de Manila University | 22 | 25 | 23 | 25 | 15 | Patricia Lynn Taganas |
| 5 PM | Far Eastern University | 20 | 25 | 25 | 22 | 15 | Wendyanne Semana |
| 5 PM | Lyceum of the Philippines University | 25 | 23 | 17 | 25 | 12 | Beverly Boto |
| TIME | OCTOBER 23 - THE ARENA, SAN JUAN | | | | | | |
| TIME | Team | 1st | 2nd | 3rd | 4th | 5th | Best Player |
| 3 PM | San Sebastian College - Recoletos | 18 | 25 | 29 | 20 | 15 | Rysabelle Devanadera |
| 3 PM | Ateneo de Manila University | 25 | 23 | 27 | 25 | 7 | Ma. Rosario Soriano |
| 5 PM | Far Eastern University | 20 | 19 | 19 | - | - | Rachel Anne Daquis |
| 5 PM | University of Santo Tomas | 25 | 25 | 25 | - | - | Mary Jean Balse |
| TIME | OCTOBER 26 - THE ARENA, SAN JUAN | | | | | | |
| TIME | Team | 1st | 2nd | 3rd | 4th | 5th | Best Player |
| 3 PM | Ateneo de Manila University | 25 | 25 | 25 | - | - | Ma. Rosario Soriano |
| 3 PM | Colegio de San Juan de Letran | 8 | 9 | 7 | - | - | Rossan Fajardo |
| 5 PM | San Sebastian College - Recoletos | 25 | 26 | 25 | - | - | Rysabelle Devanadera |
| 5 PM | Lyceum of the Philippines University | 22 | 24 | 16 | - | - | Sherilyn Carrillo |
| TIME | OCTOBER 28 - THE ARENA, SAN JUAN | | | | | | |
| TIME | Team | 1st | 2nd | 3rd | 4th | 5th | Best Player |
| 3 PM | Colegio de San Juan de Letran | 13 | 14 | 13 | - | - | Cindy Optana |
| 3 PM | University of Santo Tomas | 25 | 25 | 25 | - | - | Ma. Angeli Tabaquero |
| 5 PM | Lyceum of the Philippines University | 21 | 25 | 25 | 22 | - | Estrelita Enriquez |
| 5 PM | Ateneo de Manila University | 25 | 17 | 27 | 25 | - | Karla Bello |
| TIME | OCTOBER 30 - THE ARENA, SAN JUAN | | | | | | |
| TIME | Team | 1st | 2nd | 3rd | 4th | 5th | Best Player |
| 3 PM | Adamson University | 25 | 25 | 24 | 25 | - | Rissa Jane Laguilles |
| 3 PM | Colegio de San Juan de Letran | 18 | 17 | 26 | 18 | - | Joy Gazelle Cases |
| 5 PM | De La Salle University-Manila | 20 | 22 | 16 | - | - | Michelle Pauline Datuin |
| 5 PM | San Sebastian College - Recoletos | 25 | 25 | 25 | - | - | Laurence Anne Latigay |
| TIME | NOVEMBER 2 - THE ARENA, SAN JUAN | | | | | | |
| TIME | Team | 1st | 2nd | 3rd | 4th | 5th | Best Player |
| 3 PM | Ateneo de Manila University | 25 | 21 | 25 | 25 | - | Ma. Rosario Soriano |
| 3 PM | Adamson University | 19 | 25 | 21 | 21 | - | Nerissa Bautista |
| 5 PM | Lyceum of the Philippines University | 25 | 25 | 21 | 22 | 15 | Sherrilyn Carillo |
| 5 PM | De La Salle University-Manila | 23 | 21 | 25 | 25 | 11 | Jacqueline Alarca |
| TIME | NOVEMBER 4 - THE ARENA, SAN JUAN | | | | | | |
| TIME | Team | 1st | 2nd | 3rd | 4th | 5th | Best Player |
| 3 PM | Colegio de San Juan de Letran | 25 | 20 | 17 | 25 | 13 | Rossan Fajardo |
| 3 PM | Lyceum of the Philippines University | 6 | 25 | 25 | 23 | 15 | Sherrilyn Carrillo |
| 5 PM | University of Santo Tomas | 25 | 17 | 25 | 25 | - | Suzanne Roces |
| 5 PM | Adamson University | 15 | 25 | 18 | 23 | - | Nerissa Bautista |
| TIME | NOVEMBER 5 - THE ARENA, SAN JUAN | | | | | | |
| TIME | Team | 1st | 2nd | 3rd | 4th | 5th | Best Player |
| 3 PM | Far Eastern University | 25 | 11 | 18 | 9 | - | Wendyanne Semana |
| 3 PM | San Sebastian College - Recoletos | 17 | 25 | 25 | 25 | - | Jinni Mondejar |
| 5 PM | Ateneo de Manila University | 23 | 19 | 20 | - | - | Ma. Rosario Soriano |
| 5 PM | De La Salle University-Manila | 25 | 25 | 25 | - | - | Ma. Carla Llaguno |
| TIME | NOVEMBER 9 - THE ARENA, SAN JUAN | | | | | | |
| TIME | Team | 1st | 2nd | 3rd | 4th | 5th | Best Player |
| 3 PM | Far Eastern University | 15 | 20 | 24 | - | - | Wendyanne Semana |
| 3 PM | De La Salle University-Manila | 25 | 25 | 26 | - | - | Jacqueline Alarca |
| 5 PM | Lyceum of the Philippines University | 17 | 25 | 15 | 18 | - | Sherrilyn Carrillo |
| 5 PM | University of Santo Tomas | 25 | 22 | 25 | 25 | - | Suzanne Roces |
| TIME | NOVEMBER 12 - THE ARENA, SAN JUAN | | | | | | |
| TIME | Team | 1st | 2nd | 3rd | 4th | 5th | Best Player |
| 3 PM | Ateneo de Manila University | 25 | 14 | 12 | 27 | 15 | Ma. Rosario Soriano |
| 3 PM | Far Eastern University | 20 | 25 | 25 | 25 | 11 | Wendyanne Semana |
| 5 PM | University of Santo Tomas | 21 | 25 | 25 | 25 | - | Denise Patricia Tan |
| 5 PM | San Sebastian College - Recoletos | 25 | 19 | 9 | 16 | - | Jinni Mondejar |
| TIME | NOVEMBER 13 - THE ARENA, SAN JUAN | | | | | | |
| TIME | Team | 1st | 2nd | 3rd | 4th | 5th | Best Player |
| 3 PM | Adamson University | 19 | 25 | 25 | 25 | - | Nerissa Bautista |
| 3 PM | De La Salle University-Manila | 25 | 16 | 23 | 18 | - | Jacqueline Alarca |
| 5 PM | Colegio de San Juan de Letran | 17 | 10 | 11 | - | - | Roxanne Fajardo |
| 5 PM | San Sebastian College - Recoletos | 25 | 25 | 25 | - | - | Rysabelle Devanadera |
END OF ELIMINATIONS

== Semi-finals standings ==
| QUALIFIED FOR FINALS | FOR PLAYOFFS | BATTLE FOR 3RD | ELIMINATED AT SEMIS |

| Rank | Team | Win | Loss | Sets Won | Sets Lost | Percentage |
|---|---|---|---|---|---|---|
| 1 | San Sebastian College - Recoletos | 4 | 0 | 12 | 3 | 91% |
| 2 | Ateneo de Manila University | 3 | 1 | 9 | 5 | 83% |
| 3 | University of Santo Tomas | 2 | 2 | 8 | 10 | 69% |
| 4 | Adamson University | 1 | 3 | 7 | 10 | 61% |
| 5 | De La Salle University-Manila | 0 | 4 | 4 | 12 | 48% |

San Sebastian and Ateneo were the first two teams to reach the Semi-Finals by both defeating Lyceum of the Philippines University. University of Santo Tomas came next by winning against Adamson University, thus assuring themselves of a Semi-Finals berth. Adamson University clinched a playoff for the Semi-Finals slot by winning over Colegio de San Juan de Letran. De La Salle University-Manila also clinched a playoff for the last Semi-Finals slot against Far Eastern University. Colegio de San Juan de Letran got eliminated earlier by Adamson University as well as Lyceum of the Philippines University who bowed out of contention by losing to University of Santo Tomas. Far Eastern University also got eliminated at the latest stage of the eliminations by Ateneo de Manila University.

START OF SEMI-FINALS
| TIME | NOVEMBER 16 - THE ARENA, SAN JUAN | | | | | | |
| TIME | Team | 1st | 2nd | 3rd | 4th | 5th | Best Player |
| 3 PM | San Sebastian College - Recoletos | 25 | 25 | 25 | - | - | Laurence Anne Latigay |
| 3 PM | Ateneo de Manila University | 21 | 17 | 19 | - | - | Ma. Rosario Soriano |
| 5 PM | University of Santo Tomas | 22 | 25 | 17 | 26 | 15 | Mary Jean Balse |
| 5 PM | Adamson University | 25 | 18 | 25 | 24 | 10 | Nerissa Bautista |
| TIME | NOVEMBER 18 - THE ARENA, SAN JUAN | | | | | | |
| TIME | Team | 1st | 2nd | 3rd | 4th | 5th | Best Player |
| 3 PM | Ateneo de Manila University | 27 | 25 | 25 | - | - | Patricia Lynn Taganas |
| 3 PM | Adamson University | 25 | 15 | 22 | | | Nerissa Bautista |
| 5 PM | De La Salle University-Manila | 17 | 16 | 25 | 25 | 8 | Maureen Penetrante |
| 5 PM | University of Santo Tomas | 25 | 25 | 18 | 19 | 15 | Suzanne Roces |
| TIME | NOVEMBER 20 - THE ARENA, SAN JUAN | | | | | | |
| TIME | Team | 1st | 2nd | 3rd | 4th | 5th | Best Player |
| 3 PM | Adamson University | 25 | 29 | 16 | 25 | 7 | Nerissa Bautista |
| 3 PM | San Sebastian College - Recoletos | 21 | 31 | 25 | 22 | 15 | Rysabelle Devanadera |
| 5 PM | Ateneo de Manila University | 25 | 22 | 25 | 25 | - | Ma. Carmina Denise Acevedo |
| 5 PM | De La Salle University-Manila | 21 | 25 | 19 | 15 | - | Jacqueline Alarca |
| TIME | NOVEMBER 23 - THE ARENA, SAN JUAN | | | | | | |
| TIME | Team | 1st | 2nd | 3rd | 4th | 5th | Best Player |
| 3 PM | De La Salle University-Manila | 19 | 26 | 23 | 20 | - | Jacqueline Alarca |
| 3 PM | Adamson University | 25 | 24 | 25 | 25 | - | Angela Benting |
| 5 PM | University of Santo Tomas | 19 | 25 | 17 | 21 | - | Venus Bernal |
| 5 PM | San Sebastian College - Recoletos | 25 | 23 | 25 | 25 | - | Mary Jane Pepito |
| TIME | NOVEMBER 25 - THE ARENA, SAN JUAN | | | | | | |
| TIME | Team | 1st | 2nd | 3rd | 4th | 5th | Best Player |
| 3 PM | San Sebastian College - Recoletos | 25 | 25 | 25 | - | - | Rysabelle Devanadera |
| 3 PM | De La Salle University-Manila | 21 | 20 | 17 | - | - | Ma. Carla Llaguno |
| 5 PM | Ateneo de Manila University | 20 | 25 | 25 | 25 | - | Ma. Carmina Denise Acevedo |
| 5 PM | University of Santo Tomas | 25 | 21 | 19 | 22 | - | Ma. Angeli Tabaquero |
END OF SEMIFINALS

== Finals berth playoffs ==
Ateneo de Manila University and University of Santo Tomas faced-off in a playoff match to determine who will get the last finals slot.

The first slot has already been taken by San Sebastian College - Recoletos; winning 10 out of 11 games and sweeping the semi-finals round.

University of Santo Tomas won 8 out of 11 games all in all but unsuccessful to win 3 out of 4 games in the semi-finals. Ateneo de Manila University, won 7 out of 11 games and had been given a chance for a playoffs against University of Santo Tomas because they won 3 semi-final games out of 4 games.

Adamson University and De La Salle University had been eliminated in the finals contention for failing to win three wins out of four games and with a lower standing than University of Santo Tomas, San Sebastian College - Recoletos and Ateneo de Manila University.

Among the eight teams this season, Lyceum of the Philippines University, Far Eastern University and Colegio de San Juan de Letran were the first ones to be eliminated.

FINALS PLAYOFF
| TIME | NOVEMBER 27 - THE ARENA, SAN JUAN | | | | | | |
| TIME | Team | 1st | 2nd | 3rd | 4th | 5th | Best Player |
| 5 PM | University of Santo Tomas | 25 | 25 | 23 | 25 | - | Suzanne Roces |
| 5 PM | Ateneo de Manila University | 17 | 23 | 25 | 19 | - | Ma. Rosario Soriano |

== Finals round ==
University of Santo Tomas defeated Ateneo de Manila University and denied them the chance to face the San Sebastian College - Recoletos for the Finals. The Finals featured the UAAP CHAMPION and the Season 4 1st Conference Shakey's V-league Champion University of Santo Tomas and the NCAA CHAMPION and the Season 4 1st Conference Shakey's V-league First Runner-up San Sebastian College - Recoletos, the two most prestigious collegiate leagues in the Philippines. It had also meant that both schools faced each other again for the second consecutive time in the finals of the Shakey's V-league, in which all of it had happened within the 4th season; albeit separate conferences.

START OF FINALS
| TIME | NOVEMBER 30 - THE ARENA, SAN JUAN | | | | | | |
| TIME | Team | 1st | 2nd | 3rd | 4th | 5th | Best Player |
BATTLE FOR THIRD GAME ONE
| 2 PM | Ateneo de Manila University | 14 | 25 | 25 | 25 | - | Ma. Carmina Denise Acevedo |
| 2 PM | Adamson University | 25 | 21 | 19 | 19 | - | Nerissa Bautista |
FINALS GAME ONE
| 4 PM | University of Santo Tomas | 16 | 19 | 25 | 25 | 13 | Suzanne Roces |
| 4 PM | San Sebastian College - Recoletos | 25 | 25 | 17 | 23 | 15 | Laurence Anne Latigay |
| TIME | DECEMBER 2 - THE ARENA, SAN JUAN | | | | | | |
| TIME | Team | 1st | 2nd | 3rd | 4th | 5th | Best Player |
BATTLE FOR THIRD GAME TWO
| 2 PM | Adamson University | 23 | 22 | 23 | - | - | Nerissa Bautista |
| 2 PM | Ateneo de Manila University | 25 | 25 | 25 | - | - | Ma. Carmina Denise Acevedo |
FINALS GAME TWO
| 4 PM | San Sebastian College - Recoletos | 16 | 15 | 21 | - | - | Laurence Anne Latigay |
| 4 PM | University of Santo Tomas | 25 | 25 | 25 | - | - | Suzanne Roces |
| TIME | DECEMBER 4 - THE ARENA, SAN JUAN | | | | | | |
| TIME | Team | 1st | 2nd | 3rd | 4th | 5th | Best Player |
FINALS GAME THREE
| 3 PM | University of Santo Tomas | 20 | 25 | 27 | 25 | 15 | Venus Bernal |
| 3 PM | San Sebastian College - Recoletos | 25 | 23 | 29 | 15 | 9 | Laurence Anne Latigay |

== Conference awardees ==
- Best in Sportsmanship: Ma. Angeli Tabaquero
- Most Energetic Player: Maria Rosario Soriano
- Most Improved Player: Janet Serafica
- Rookie of the Conference: Ma. Carmina Denise Acevedo
- Power Player of the Conference: Laurence Ann Latigay
- Hustle Player of the Conference: Mary Jane Pepito
- Player of the Conference: Venus Bernal
- Best scorer: Lithawat Kesinee
- Best attacker: Jaroensri Bualee
- Best blocker: Lithawat Kesinee
- Best server: Jacqueline Alarca
- Best setter: Charisse Vernon Ancheta
- Best receiver: Mary Jane Pepito
- Best digger: Lizlee Ann Gata
- Finals MVP: Venus Bernal
- Conference MVP: Lithawat Kesinee
