= CRI Nairobi 91.9 FM =

Radio station in Kenya

CRI 91.9 FM is a radio station in Nairobi, Kenya. It is part of China Radio International (CRI). It broadcasts in English, Swahili and Mandarin. It launched on February 27, 2006 and carries its service nationwide. The station is part of China's plans to use Kenya as a launch pad for media outlets in Africa.

== Programming ==
The CRI programme schedule includes "The Hot Pot Show" hosted by award-winning DJ Duggy Day is a music/entertainment programme which highlights the Chinese pop music scene, and showbiz world. Listeners can also hear about tourist attractions in China, and be kept up-to-date about happenings inside CRI's two official websites. Other regular programmes are "Music Safari" and "China Now".
