= Huawen Group =

Chinese media company

- Formerly: Huawen Media Investment Corp., Ltd.
- Company type: Public
- Traded as: SZSE: 000793
- Headquarters: China
- Revenue: ▲CN¥4.336 billion (2015)
- Net income: ▲CN¥1.064 billion (2015)
- Total assets: ▲CN¥12.818 billion (2015)
- Total equity: ▲CN¥8.842 billion (2015)
- Owner: Global Broadcasting A.M. (11.15%)

Chinese name
- Simplified Chinese: 华闻传媒投资集团股份有限公司
Transcriptions

Alternative Chinese name
- Simplified Chinese: 华闻传媒
- Traditional Chinese: 華聞傳媒
Transcriptions
- Website: 000793.com
- Footnotes / references in consolidated basis

Huawen Group (Chinese: 华闻传媒) is a private-sector publicly listed Chinese media holding company. It is one of the 500 components of the SZSE Component Index, as well as the sub-index SZSE 300 Index and SZSE 100 Index.

== Acquisitions ==
In 2006, the company acquired the commercial brokerage rights of the Securities Times (a newspaper under state-owned People's Daily) for 30 years.

In 2016, Huawen Media Investment subscribed the new shares of China International Broadcasting Network (CIBN, traded as Chinese: 国广东方网络（北京）有限公司). After the deal, Huawen Media owned a 30.9996% stake, while Global Broadcasting Media Group owned a 34% stake and was the largest shareholder. Global Broadcasting Media Group was also the indirect major shareholder of Huawen Media Investment.

== Shareholders ==
The largest shareholder of the company was (Chinese: 国广环球资产管理有限公司; lit. 'Global Broadcasting Asset Management') with 11.15% of the shares. Global Broadcasting Asset Management is a subsidiary (58.0344%) of Global Broadcasting Media Group (Chinese: 国广环球传媒控股有限公司). Global Broadcasting Media Group is a joint venture (50–50) of state-owned broadcasting company China Radio International with a private company.
