= 2007 Shakey's V-League 1st Conference =

V-League 4th Season
Women's Finals	G1	G2	Wins
UST Growling Tigresses	3	3	2
San Sebastian Lady Stags	0	1	0
- Arena(s): Filoil Flying V Arena
- Finals MVP: Mary Jean Balse
- Semifinalists: Lyceum Lady Pirates; De La Salle Lady Archers; Adamson Lady Falcons
- TV network(s): NBN

The 2007 Shakey's V-League 1st Conference was the fifth conference of the Shakey's V-League and the first conference of the 2007 season. The tournament began last May 17, 2007 and ended on July 3, 2007, with the UST Tigresses winning two games to none against the SSC-R Lady Stags.

== Tournament Format ==
- Single Round Robin Tournament
- Top five teams compete in the semi-finals
- Top two teams with the best record after the single-round robin semi-finals advance to the finals
  - If a team wins 3 out of 4 games, they have a chance for a playoff berth against the second seed team for the finals
- Best of Three Championship series

== Starting Line-ups ==
SEASON 4, CONFERENCE 1
School	Setter	Middle	Open	Utility	Middle	Open	Libero
Adamson	Janet Serafica	Jacqueline So	Hannah Suarez	Rissa Jane Laguilles	Suzanne Roces*	Angela Benting	Donna Leil Adajar
Ateneo	Karla Bello	Michelle Laborte*	Patricia Lynn Taganas; Amelia Guanco*	Ma. Rosario Soriano	Bea Pascual*	Namphon Inutan*; Jindarat Kanchana	Stephanie Gabriel
Far Eastern	Wendyanne Semana	Ma. Josephine Cafranca	Cecille Tabuena	Anna Camille Abanto	Mecaila Morada	Rachel Anne Daquis	Victoria Alemania
La Salle	Relea Ferina Saet	Michelle Pauline Datuin	Sanoerseang Areerat*	Amelia Guanco*; Ma. Carla Llaguno	Jacqueline Alarca; Desiree Hernandez*	Manilla Santos	Regine Diego
Letran	Marielle Go	Dianne Diaz	Michelle Carolino*	Marietta Carolino*	Joy Gazelle Cases	Bangladesh Pantaleon	Kriszelle Moralejo
Lyceum	Cristina Salak*	Beverly Boto	Josielyn Degoroztisa	Jane Kathleen Jarin	Dahlia Cruz	Sherilyn Carillo	Shiela Marga
San Sebastian	Ma. Theresa Iratay*	Joy Pulido	Jaroensri Bualee*	Jinni Mondejar	Rysabelle Devanadera	Laurence Ann Latigay	Mary Jane Pepito
Santo Tomas	Rubie de Leon*	Lilet Mabbayad; Suzanne Roces	Maria Angeli Tabaquero	Aiza Maizo; Vida Rica Gutierrez	Mary Jean Balse	Venus Bernal	Cherry Anne Balse

== Current standings ==
QUALIFIED FOR SEMI-FINALS	FOR PLAYOFFS	ELIMINATED

Rank	Team	Win	Loss	Sets Won	Sets Lost	Percentage!
1	Lyceum of the Philippines University	6	1	18	7	86%
2	San Sebastian College - Recoletos	6	1	18	9	82%
3	University of Santo Tomas	4	3	16	10	73%
4	Ateneo de Manila University	3	4	15	16	60%
5	De La Salle University	3	4	12	14	56%
5	Adamson University	3	4	18	19	48%
7	Far Eastern University	2	5	10	19	34%
8	Colegio de San Juan de Letran	1	6	10	22	31%

== Elimination round ==
START OF ELIMINATIONS
TIME	MAY 17 - THE ARENA, SAN JUAN						
TIME	Team	1st	2nd	3rd	4th	5th	Best Player
9 AM	San Sebastian College - Recoletos	24	25	25	25	-	Jaroensri Bualee
9 AM	Colegio de San Juan de Letran	26	16	18	15	-	Michelle Carolino
11 AM	Lyceum of the Philippines University	28	25	22	25	-	Sherylyn Carillo
11 AM	Ateneo de Manila University	26	23	25	23	-	Namphon Intuan
2 PM	De La Salle University-Manila	25	25	25	-	-	Amelia Guanco
2 PM	Far Eastern University	16	17	21	-	-	Cecille Tabuena
TIME	MAY 22 - THE ARENA, SAN JUAN						
TIME	Team	1st	2nd	3rd	4th	5th	Best Player
1 PM	Colegio de San Juan de Letran	19	18	24	-	-	Michelle Carolino
1 PM	Lyceum of the Philippines University	25	25	26	-	-	Beverly Boto
3 PM	Far Eastern University	25	25	20	21	16	Rachel Anne Daquis
3 PM	Adamson University	23	18	25	25	14	Suzanne Roces
5 PM	University of Santo Tomas	23	25	25	25	-	Venus Bernal
5 PM	De La Salle University-Manila	25	20	18	16	-	Carla Marie Llaguno
TIME	MAY 24 - THE ARENA, SAN JUAN						
TIME	Team	1st	2nd	3rd	4th	5th	Best Player
1 PM	Ateneo de Manila University	18	25	25	20	15	Karla Bello
1 PM	University of Santo Tomas	25	21	19	25	10	Maria Angeli Tabaquero
3 PM	Lyceum of the Philippines University	25	25	25	-	-	Beverly Boto
3 PM	San Sebastian College - Recoletos	22	21	22	-	-	Jaroensri Bualee
5 PM	Adamson University	25	25	17	19	10	Suzanne Roces
5 PM	De La Salle University-Manila	23	18	25	25	15	Amelia Guanco
TIME	MAY 29 - THE ARENA, SAN JUAN						
TIME	Team	1st	2nd	3rd	4th	5th	Best Player
1 PM	Far Eastern University	19	18	31	19	-	Mecaila Morada
1 PM	Lyceum of the Philippines University	25	25	29	25	-	Sherilyn Carillo
3 PM	Colegio de San Juan de Letran	26	17	15	22	-	Michelle Carolino
3 PM	Ateneo de Manila University	24	25	25	25	-	Michelle Laborte
5 PM	De La Salle University-Manila	16	12	16	-	-	Amelia Guanco
5 PM	San Sebastian College - Recoletos	25	25	25	-	-	Jaroensri Bualee
TIME	MAY 31 - THE ARENA, SAN JUAN						
TIME	Team	1st	2nd	3rd	4th	5th	Best Player
1 PM	San Sebastian College - Recoletos	22	25	20	25	15	Jaroensri Bualee
1 PM	Far Eastern University	25	15	25	13	6	Mecaila Morada
3 PM	Lyceum of the Philippines University	25	25	19	25	-	Josielyn Degoroztisa
3 PM	Adamson University	11	21	25	15	-	Suzanne Roces
5 PM	University of Santo Tomas	25	25	25	-	-	Mary Jean Balse
5 PM	Colegio de San Juan de Letran	23	23	20	-	-	Michelle Carolino
TIME	JUNE 3 - THE ARENA, SAN JUAN						
TIME	Team	1st	2nd	3rd	4th	5th	Best Player
1 PM	Adamson University	20	25	25	25	-	Suzanne Roces
1 PM	University of Santo Tomas	25	17	16	22	-	Mary Jean Balse
3 PM	Far Eastern University	25	23	26	12	-	Rachel Anne Daquis
3 PM	Colegio de San Juan de Letran	19	25	25	25	-	Dianne Diaz
5 PM	Ateneo de Manila University	22	25	25	25	-	Michelle Laborte
5 PM	De La Salle University-Manila	25	23	21	15	-	Jacqueline Alarca
TIME	JUNE 5 - THE ARENA, SAN JUAN						
TIME	Team	1st	2nd	3rd	4th	5th	Best Player
1 PM	Adamson University	16	20	25	25	15	Suzanne Roces
1 PM	Ateneo de Manila University	25	25	22	20	13	Michelle Laborte
3 PM	Colegio de San Juan de Letran	22	18	25	17	-	Michelle Carolino
3 PM	De La Salle University-Manila	25	25	23	25	-	Amelia Guanco
5 PM	University of Santo Tomas	24	14	25	21	-	Venus Bernal
5 PM	San Sebastian College - Recoletos	26	25	18	25	-	Jaroensri Bualee
TIME	JUNE 7 - THE ARENA, SAN JUAN						
TIME	Team	1st	2nd	3rd	4th	5th	Best Player
1 PM	University of Santo Tomas	25	25	25	-	-	Mary Jean Balse
1 PM	Lyceum of the Philippines University	15	14	20	-	-	Sherilyn Carillo
3 PM	San Sebastian College - Recoletos	25	25	25	25	-	Jaroensri Bualee
3 PM	Adamson University	18	27	21	17	-	Suzanne Roces
5 PM	Ateneo de Manila University	25	25	22	21	14	Michelle Laborte
5 PM	Far Eastern University	12	23	25	25	16	Rachel Anne Daquis
TIME	JUNE 10 - THE ARENA, SAN JUAN						
TIME	Team	1st	2nd	3rd	4th	5th	Best Player
2 PM	Lyceum of the Philippines University	25	9	25	25	-	Cristina Salak
2 PM	De La Salle University	17	25	23	20	-	Amelia Guanco
4 PM	Colegio de San Juan de Letran	20	25	20	25	10	Michelle Carolino
4 PM	Adamson University	25	22	25	20	15	Suzanne Roces
TIME	JUNE 12 - THE ARENA, SAN JUAN						
TIME	Team	1st	2nd	3rd	4th	5th	Best Player
2 PM	Far Eastern University	10	24	19	-	-	Rachel Anne Daquis
2 PM	University of Santo Tomas	25	26	25	-	-	Mary Jean Balse
4 PM	Ateneo de Manila University	25	17	18	32	-	Michelle Laborte
4 PM	San Sebastian College - Recoletos	23	25	25	34	-	Jaroensri Bualee
END OF ELIMINATIONS

== Semi-finals Berth Playoff ==
Adamson University and De La Salle University faced off in a playoff match to determine who will get the last semi-finals slot.

The other slots have been taken by Lyceum of the Philippines University, San Sebastian College - Recoletos, University of Santo Tomas and Ateneo de Manila University.

TIME	JUNE 14 - THE ARENA, SAN JUAN						
TIME	Team	1st	2nd	3rd	4th	5th	Best Player
3 PM	De La Salle University	19	18	25	26	15	Jacqueline Alarca
3 PM	Adamson University	25	25	22	24	6	Suzanne Roces

== Semi-finals standings ==
QUALIFIED FOR FINALS	FOR PLAYOFFS	BATTLE FOR 3RD	ELIMINATED AT SEMIS

Rank	Team	Win	Loss	Sets Won	Sets Lost	Percentage
1	University of Santo Tomas	4	0	12	1	95%
2	De La Salle University-Manila	3	1	8	5	87%
3	San Sebastian College - Recoletos	2	2	8	6	79%
4	Lyceum of the Philippines University	1	3	3	11	55%
5	Ateneo de Manila University	0	4	3	12	48%

START OF SEMI-FINALS
TIME	JUNE 17 - THE ARENA, SAN JUAN						
TIME	Team	1st	2nd	3rd	4th	5th	Best Player
2 PM	Lyceum of the Philippines University	9	21	16	-	-	Cristina Salak
2 PM	De La Salle University	25	25	25	-	-	Carla Llaguno
4 PM	San Sebastian College - Recoletos	25	25	25	-	-	Jaroensri Bualee
4 PM	Ateneo de Manila University	19	17	23	-	-	Michelle Laborte
TIME	JUNE 19 - THE ARENA, SAN JUAN						
TIME	Team	1st	2nd	3rd	4th	5th	Best Player
2 PM	De La Salle University	25	20	25	24	15	Michelle Datuin
2 PM	San Sebastian College - Recoletos	17	25	21	26	13	Jaroensri Bualee
4 PM	Ateneo de Manila University	25	10	23	20	-	Michelle Laborte
4 PM	University of Santo Tomas	20	25	25	25	-	Mary Jean Balse
TIME	JUNE 21 - THE ARENA, SAN JUAN						
TIME	Team	1st	2nd	3rd	4th	5th	Best Player
2 PM	Lyceum of the Philippines University	19	25	19	25	15	Cristina Salak
2 PM	Ateneo de Manila University	25	23	25	15	10	Michelle Laborte
4 PM	University of Santo Tomas	25	25	25	-	-	Rubie De Leon
4 PM	San Sebastian College - Recoletos	22	21	21	-	-	Jaroensri Bualee
TIME	JUNE 24 - THE ARENA, SAN JUAN						
TIME	Team	1st	2nd	3rd	4th	5th	Best Player
2 PM	University of Santo Tomas	25	25	25	-	-	Rubie De Leon
2 PM	Lyceum of the Philippines University	19	18	23	-	-	Sherilyn Carillo
4 PM	Ateneo de Manila University	19	19	15	-	-	Michelle Laborte
4 PM	De La Salle University	25	25	25	-	-	Jacqueline Alarca
TIME	JUNE 26 - THE ARENA, SAN JUAN						
TIME	Team	1st	2nd	3rd	4th	5th	Best Player
2 PM	De La Salle University	14	21	17	-	-	Manilla Santos
2 PM	University of Santo Tomas	25	25	25	-	-	Maria Angeli Tabaquero
4 PM	San Sebastian College - Recoletos	26	25	25	-	-	Laurence Ann Latigay
4 PM	Lyceum of the Philippines University	24	17	23	-	-	Beverly Boto
END OF SEMI-FINALS

== Finals Berth Playoffs ==
San Sebastian College - Recoletos and De La Salle University faced-off in a playoff match to determine who will get the last finals slot.

The other slot had already been taken by University of Santo Tomas; winning 8 out of 11 games and sweeping the semi-finals game. They lost by only a single set to Ateneo de Manila University.

San Sebastian College - Recoletos won also 8 out of 11 games all in all but failed to win 3 out of 4 games in the semi-finals. De La Salle University, even though they won only 6 out of 11 games, had been given a chance for a playoffs against San Sebastian College - Recoletos because they won 3 semi-final games out of 4 games.

Lyceum of the Philippines University and Ateneo de Manila University had been eliminated in the finals contention for failing to win three wins out of four games and with a lower standing than University of Santo Tomas, San Sebastian College - Recoletos and De La Salle University.

Among the eight teams this season, Adamson University, Far Eastern University and Colegio de San Juan de Letran were the first ones to be eliminated.

PLAYOFF
TIME	JUNE 28 - THE ARENA, SAN JUAN						
TIME	Team	1st	2nd	3rd	4th	5th	Best Player
5 PM	San Sebastian College - Recoletos	25	23	25	25	-	Jaroensri Bualee
5 PM	De La Salle University	18	25	21	22	-	Michelle Datuin

== Championship Games ==
San Sebastian College-Recoletos defeated De La Salle University, ending the latter's bid for a fourth consecutive title and advancing to face the University of Santo Tomas (UST) in the Finals. The championship series features the titleholders from the Philippines' primary collegiate leagues, the NCAA and the UAAP. This matchup follows previous seasons where both San Sebastian and UST finished as runners-up to De La Salle.

TIME	JULY 1 - THE ARENA, SAN JUAN						
TIME	Team	1st	2nd	3rd	4th	5th	Best Player
BATTLE FOR THIRD
2 PM	Lyceum of the Philippines University	25	25	25	-	-	Sherilyn Carillo
2 PM	De La Salle University	19	23	19	-	-	Manilla Santos
FINALS GAME ONE
5 PM	University of Santo Tomas	25	25	25	-	-	Venus Bernal
5 PM	San Sebastian College - Recoletos	17	12	17	-	-	Jaroensri Bualee

TIME	JULY 3 - THE ARENA, SAN JUAN						
TIME	Team	1st	2nd	3rd	4th	5th	Best Player
FINALS GAME TWO
5 PM	San Sebastian College - Recoletos	14	19	25	13	-	Jaroensri Bualee
5 PM	University of Santo Tomas	25	25	17	25	-	Mary Jean Balse

== Awardees ==
- Best setter - Maria Theresa Iratay (SSC)
- Best server - Karla Bello (ADMU)
- Best digger - Mary Jane Pepito (SSC)
- Best receiver - Sheila Marga (LPU)
- Best blocker - Michelle Laborte (ADMU)
- Best attacker - Mary Jean Balse (UST)
- Best scorer - Jaroensri Bualee (SSC)
- Finals Most Valuable Player - Mary Jean Balse (UST)
- MOST VALUABLE PLAYER- Jaroensri Bualee (SSC)
