= Pacific Construction Group =

Chinese construction company

- Native name: 太平洋建设集团
- Company type: Private
- Industry: Construction
- Founded: 1986
- Founder: Yan Jiehe
- Headquarters: Urumqi, Xinjiang, China
- Key people: Yan Hao (CEO)
- Revenue: US$ 86.623 billion (2018)
- Net income: US$ 3.391 billion (2018)
- Number of employees: 387,525 (2018)
- Website: Pacific Construction Group

The China Pacific Construction Group (CPCG) is a Chinese construction company headquartered in Ürümqi, Xinjiang. The CPCG was founded in 1986 as YinJiang Company. Since 1995 it is operating under the name Pacific Construction Group. The company ranked 97th on the Fortune Global 500 list of the world's largest companies in 2019. In 2018 it was reported as having 387,525 employees and revenue equivalent to US$86.623 billion.

The main focus of the business activity is on the construction of infrastructure projects. These include the construction of roads, bridges, ports and industrial facilities. CPCG acts as a contractor for public urban development projects and claims to be involved in the construction of more than 1000 planned cities.
