= WNWR =

Radio station in Philadelphia

- Philadelphia, Pennsylvania; United States
- Broadcast area: Philadelphia metropolitan area
- Frequency: 1540 kHz
- Branding: AM 1540 The Word

Programming
- Format: Christian talk and teaching

Ownership
- Owner: Wilkins Broadcasting LLC

History
- First air date: July 11, 1947; 79 years ago (as WJMJ)
- Former call signs: WJMJ (1948–1965); WRCP (1965–1985); WSNI (1985–1987); WPGR (1987–1995)
- Call sign meaning: "New World Radio" (previous format and owner)

Technical information
- Licensing authority: FCC
- Facility ID: 1027
- Class: D
- Power: 10,000 watts day; 2,100 watts critical hours; 7 watts night
- Transmitter coordinates: 40°0′05.3″N 75°12′33.8″W
- Translator: 95.3 W237EH (Pennsauken, New Jersey)

Links
- Public license information: Public file; LMS
- Webcast: Listen live
- Website: www.wnwrtheword.com

WNWR (1540 AM) is a commercial radio station in Philadelphia, Pennsylvania. It broadcasts a Christian talk and teaching format and is owned by Wilkins Broadcasting LLC. Program hosts include Jim Daly, John MacArthur, Greg Laurie and Charles Capps. The studios are at 200 Monument Road, Suite 6, in Bala Cynwyd.

By day, WNWR is powered at 10,000 watts, non-directional. As 1540 AM is a clear channel frequency, to protect other stations from interference, at night it reduces power to 7 watts. The transmitter is in the Belmont Village neighborhood of Philadelphia, off Conshohocken Avenue. Programming is also heard on 250-watt FM translator W237EH at 95.3 MHz in Pennsauken, New Jersey. The actual area where the tower is carries the title Wynnefield Heights. A single tower carries the station. The coordinates previously quoted referred to the 3-mast array in Roxborough which was replaced by a road of new houses.

== History ==
=== Christian programming ===
The station first signed on the air on July 11, 1947. Its call sign was WJMJ which stood for "Jesus, Mary, Joseph". The station broadcast middle-of-the-road music and religious programming. It was owned by Patrick Joseph Stanton and had its offices and studios in the St. James Hotel.

WJMJ was a daytimer, powered at 1,000 watts and forced to sign-off at sunset to avoid interfering with other stations on 1540 kHz. In the late 1950s, the station got a boost to 50,000 watts, but it still had to stay off the air at night. One of the programs carried on WJMJ in the 1950s was George A. Palmer's popular Morning Cheer daily broadcast.

=== Country and oldies ===
In 1965, it was acquired by the Rust Craft Greeting Card Company, which changed the call letters to WRCP (for "Rust Craft Philadelphia"). In 1967, Rust Craft changed the sound to country music, a format not found on the Philadelphia radio dial.

In 1981, after WFIL also adopted a country format, WRCP switched to oldies. Later in 1985, the call sign was changed to WSNI to match sister station 104.5 WSNI-FM (now WRFF). For a time, the AM station broadcast an all-Beatles-and-Motown format. After two years, a more conventional oldies mix returned and the station became WPGR ("Philly Gold Radio").

=== Ethnic programming ===
In 1995, the station was sold to new owners operating as Global Radio LLC, becoming WNWR. The call letters stood for "New World Radio". It switched to mostly ethnic brokered programming, where show hosts bought time on the station and sold advertising in their communities to pay for their broadcasts.

On June 13, 2011, WNWR's entire brokered program schedule moved to WWDB. The station was then leased to broadcast China Radio International. Several years later, WNWR got authorization from the Federal Communications Commission to stay on the air around the clock with low power at night. WNWR went off the air and was listed as silent since June 14, 2018. As of Saturday, November 17, 2018, WNWR returned on the air broadcasting a Spanish language format. On December 8, 2019, however, it was on the FCC's Silent AM Stations List.

As of April 27, 2021, WNWR returned to the airwaves with 1,000 watts of power during the day and 7 watts at night according to station engineer Dana Puopolo. By then, the station was owned by Aztec Capital Partners and was simulcasting WHAT 1340 AM, airing Latin hit music.

=== Return to religion ===
In 2023, the station was sold to Wilkins Broadcasting LLC, which owns dozens of Christian talk and teaching stations around the U.S. WNWR returned to its beginning roots with a religious format, broadcasting as "1540 The Word". The call sign's meaning was repurposed as "New Word Radio", with "Word" as a synonym for "The Bible".

== Translator ==
Call sign	Frequency	City of license	FID	ERP (W)	Class	Transmitter coordinates	FCC info
W237EH	95.3 FM	Pennsauken, New Jersey	141664	250	D	39°55′34.6″N 75°3′11.1″W	LMS
