= Yang Chengang =

Chinese singer

- Born: February 18, 1979 (age 46); Wuhan, Hubei, China
- Occupation: Singer
- Years active: 2004–present

Chinese name
- Traditional Chinese: 楊臣剛
- Simplified Chinese: 杨臣刚
Transcriptions
Standard Mandarin
- Hanyu Pinyin: Yáng Chéngāng
- Musical career
- Origin: China
- Genres: Mandopop

Yang Chengang (simplified Chinese: 杨臣刚; traditional Chinese: 楊臣剛; pinyin: Yáng Chéngāng, born February 18, 1979) is a Chinese singer popular for being the original performer of the hit song "Mice Love Rice".

== Discography ==
=== Albums ===
- Lao Shu Ai Da Mi, December 2004
- Yang Chen Gang Mei Er Ai Wo, May 2005
- Internet Pop Musician, December 2005
- Wo Shi Ni Lao Gong, January 2006
- Lao Gong PK Lao Po, August 2006
