= Mice Love Rice =

2004 song written by Yang Chengang

"Mice Love Rice" (simplified Chinese: 老鼠爱大米; traditional Chinese: 老鼠愛大米; pinyin: Lǎoshǔ Ài Dàmǐ) is a 2004 Chinese pop song written by a then unknown music teacher Yang Chengang which gained popularity across Asia via the Internet after being posted online. The original free online version was sung by Yang's friend Wang Qiwen.

== Music and lyrics ==
One of the song's attractions is a catchy music hook around the lyric "I love you, loving you / As mice love rice".

"Mice Love Rice" was one of the first notable download hits in China, at the same period as "Lilac Flower" by Tang Lei and "The Pig" by Xiangxiang. "Mice Love Rice" became a hit in mainland China, Taiwan, Hong Kong, Indonesia, Malaysia, Singapore and Vietnam.

== Chinese cover versions ==
In Hong Kong, the Emperor Entertainment Group bought the license for redistributing in the local market and the lyrics of the Mandarin song were rewritten into a Cantonese version, except for the famous motif of the song which remains in Mandarin. The song was sung in Cantonese by Twins, a Hong Kong–based two-girl band. In Singapore, recording company Play Music won the rights to marketing the song in Singapore, and they released a single of the track as sung by Jocie Kok. Yang's song has been sung by many other Chinese artists, and Xiang Xiang, another mainland Chinese singer who issued an English translation afterwards, of dubious grammatical accuracy.

There is also an unofficial "sequel" to the song, "The Mice No Longer Love Rice" (老鼠不再爱大米) written by Chen Yipeng.

== Foreign versions ==
"Mice Love Rice" has also inspired other songs throughout the world including Sarang Haeyo (사랑해요, "I Love You") by Korean singer Lee So-Eun, Nezumi wa Kome ga Suki (ねずみは米がすき, "Mice Love Rice") by Japanese artist Karen Miyama, two Khmer versions by Cambodian singers Chhet Sovan Panha and Preap Sovath, "Cos I Love You" by the Australian boy band North, and Chuột yêu gạo by Vietnamese singer Thanh Thảo.
