= China Radio International =

State radio broadcaster in China

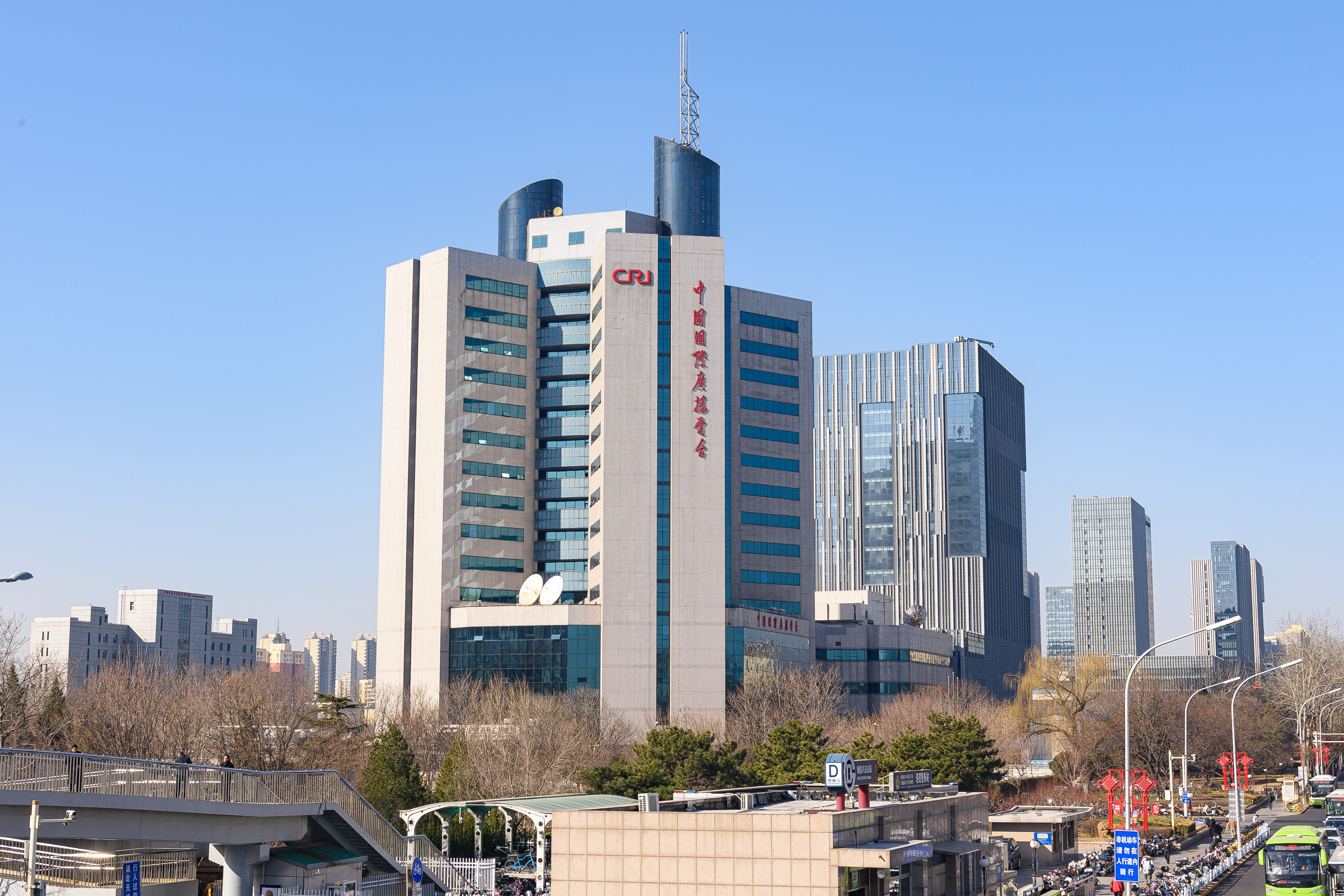
- CRI headquarters
- Type: State media
- Country: China
- Founded: 3 December 1941
- Headquarters: Beijing, China
- Broadcast area: Worldwide
- Parent: China Media Group
- Former names: Radio Peking; Radio Beijing
- Official website: www.cri.cn

China Radio International
- Simplified Chinese: 中国国际 广播电台
- Traditional Chinese: 中國國際 廣播電台
- Literal meaning: China International Radio Station
Transcriptions
Standard Mandarin
- Hanyu Pinyin: Zhōngguó Guójì Guǎngbō Diàntái
- Wade–Giles: Chungkuo Kuochi Kuangpo Tient'ai
- IPA: [ʈʂʊ́ŋkwǒ kwǒtɕî kwàŋpwó tjɛ̂ntʰǎɪ]
Yue: Cantonese
- Jyutping: Zung^{1}gwok^{3} Gwok^{3}zai^{3} Gwong^{2}bo^{3} Din^{6}toi^{4}

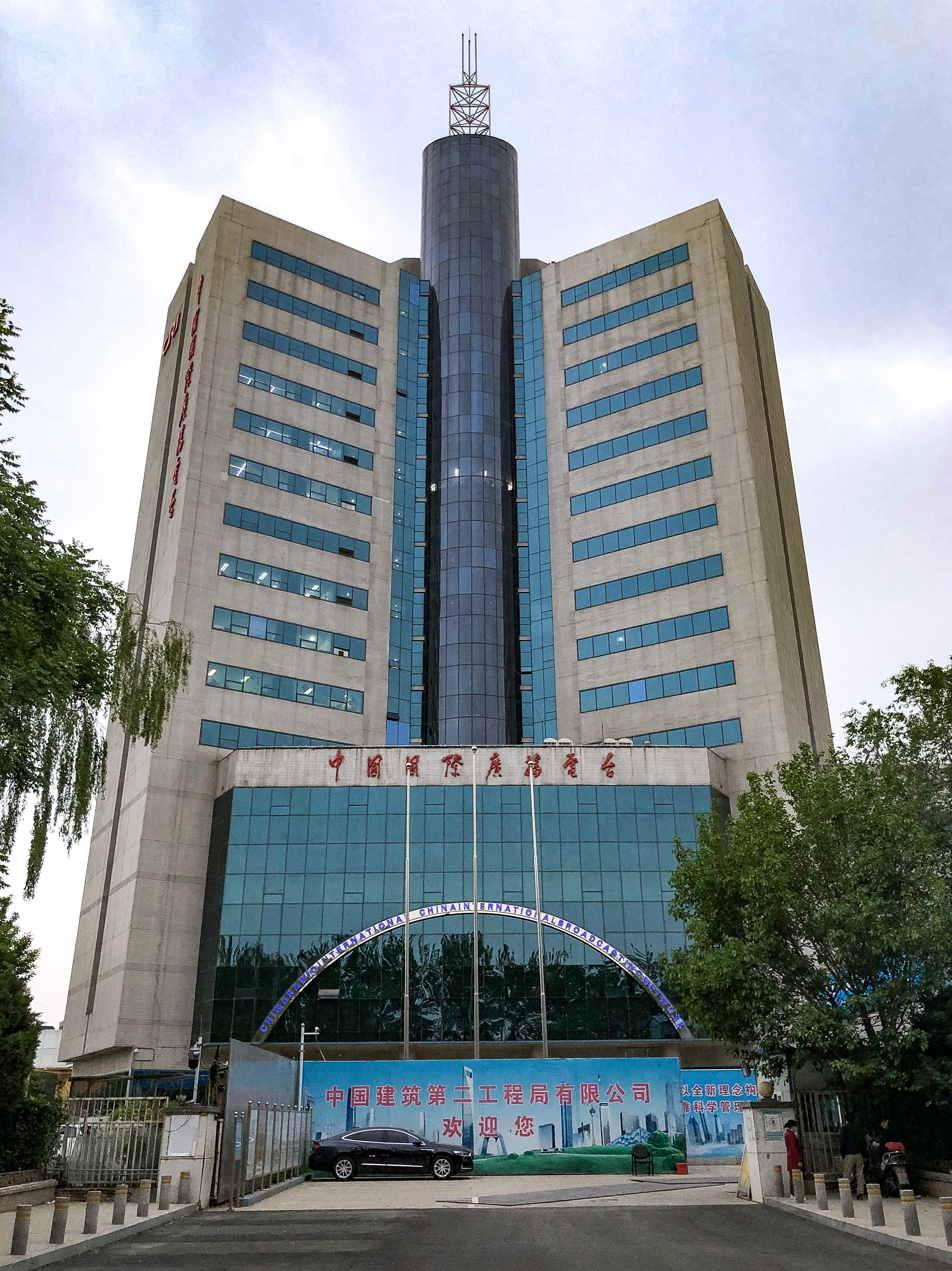
CRI headquarters in Shijingshan, Beijing

China Radio International (CRI) is the state-owned international radio broadcaster of China. It is currently headquartered in Babaoshan, Shijingshan, Beijing. It was founded on December 3, 1941, as Radio Peking. It later adopted the pinyin form Radio Beijing.

CRI is the international radio arm of the China Media Group, under the control of the Central Publicity Department of the Chinese Communist Party, created following the first session of the 13th National People's Congress in March 2018. CRI states that it "endeavours to promote favourable relations between the PRC and the world" while upholding the PRC's official positions. CRI claims to "play a significant role in the PRC's soft power strategy" and Go Out policy, aiming to expand the influence of Chinese culture and media in a global stage. CRI attempts to employ new media and partnerships with other media outlets to compete with other international media. Unlike other broadcasters, CRI's control via indirect majority ownership or financial support of radio stations in various nations is not publicly disclosed.

== History ==
Radio was first introduced in China in the 1920s and 1930s. However, few households had radio receivers. A few cities had commercial stations. Most usage of radio was for political purpose, frequently on a local area level.

The Chinese Communist Party first used radio in Yanan, Shaanxi Province in March 1940 with a transmitter imported from Moscow. Xinhua New Chinese Radio (XNCR) went on the air from Yanan on December 30, 1940. XNCR transmitted to a larger geographical area after 1945, and its programs became more regular and formalized with broadcasts of news, official announcements, war bulletins, and art and literary programs.

The English service started on September 11, 1947, transmitting as XNCR from a cave in Shahe in the Taihang Mountains, when China was in the midst of a civil war, to announce newly conquered areas and broadcast a Chinese political and cultural perspective to the world at large. The station moved from the Taihang Mountains to the capital, Peking, when The People's Republic of China was formed in 1949. Its name was changed to Radio Peking on April 10, 1950, and to Radio Beijing in 1983.

In April 1950, it began broadcasting for listeners in Vietnam, Thailand, Burma, Indonesia, and in four dialects for overseas Chinese throughout East Asia.

Radio Peking's influence and capacity grew from 1957 to 1967. By 1967, it was broadcasting 21 hours per week to East Africa.

During the Cultural Revolution, it canceled many of its regular programs and focused on broadcasting Mao Zedong's works.

On January 1, 1993, the name of the station was again changed, this time to China Radio International, in order to avoid any confusion with local Beijing radio broadcasting. Its online broadcasting platform: China International Broadcasting Network (CIBN) was formally established in 2011, as a joint venture of China Radio International, Huawen Media Investment, JinZhengYuan, Youku, Oriental Times Media and Suning Holdings Group.

Radio Peking began exchanges with Voice of America in 1982. Voice of America had opened a bureau in Beijing the previous year.

A 2015 investigative report by Reuters found a network of at least 33 radio stations in 14 countries that obscures CRI as its majority shareholder. A significant portion of the programming on these stations is either produced or provided by CRI, or by media firms CRI controls in the United States, Australia, and Europe.

In February 2020, the United States Department of State designated CRI and other Chinese state-owned media outlets as foreign missions.

CRI has focused on forging commercial partnerships, particularly in Europe, in which its content is broadcast without attribution to CRI. According to a 2023 discourse analysis by the Central European Digital Media Observatory, CRI's content steers clear of any criticism of the Chinese government.

== Programming ==
=== Mandarin radio channels ===
At the beginning of 1984, it started to broadcast home service to the Beijing area on AM and FM frequencies. The service later expanded to dozens of major cities across the PRC, providing listeners inside the PRC with timely news and reports, music, weather, English and Chinese learning skills, as well as other services.

==== News Radio (90.5 FM) ====
News Radio (环球资讯广播) was established on 28 September 2005. Its aim is to make CRI News Radio a first-class national news radio brand and its slogans are 'First News, News First', 'On-the-Spot China, Live World' etc. CRI News Radio can be heard online and in Beijing on the radio on 90.5 FM; in Tianjin 90.6 FM; in Chongqing 91.7 FM; in Guangdong, Hong Kong, and Macau 107.1 FM; in Shandong 89.8 FM; in Anhui 90.1 FM.

Popular Shows

- Laowai's Viewpoint (Chinese: 老外看点; pinyin: Lǎowài kàndiǎn), an international news program with three hosts from different countries, frequent hosts include: Peter Yu (Chinese), Julien Gaudfroy (French), Elyse Ribbons (American), Li Xin (Chinese), and Soojin Zhao (Korean).
- Bianzou Biankan (Chinese: 边走边看; pinyin: Biānzǒu biānkàn), a travel show dedicated to a new location every episode
- New Wealth Times (Chinese: 新财富时代; pinyin: Xīncáifù shídài), a financial talk show

==== Chinese podcasts ====
The following programmes can be heard on the Mandarin version of the podcast from the World Radio Network:

- News (Chinese: 新闻节目; pinyin: xīnwén jiémù), which comes from the Xinhua News Agency.
- Tángrénjiē (Chinese: 唐人街; pinyin: Tángrénjiē; lit. 'Chinatown'), a programme about overseas Chinese
- Weather forecasts around China
- Sports

This broadcast was originally targeted at London in the United Kingdom. In 2006, they removed the "London" reference, which was part of the introduction as "Ni hao London. Hello London"

=== English radio channels ===
==== CRI in English (846 AM, 1008 AM; 91.5 FM) ====
The English channels that can be heard online are:

- EZFM (also known as Easy FM) (closed on 23 December 2025; merged with CGTN Radio)
- Round the Clock (Internet only)
  - Voices from Other Lands is a weekly English radio program featuring entrepreneurs who originated outside of China doing business in China, hosted by Guanny Liu.
- CRI 91.9 FM (Kenya 91.9 FM)
- Chinese Studio is a 5-minute segment that follows most CRI English programmes
- China Drive is an English radio show about life in the PRC
- CRI Sri Lanka FM 97.9 in Sri Lanka in Sinhala and English (05:00—00:00 Sri Lanka Time)

==== English Podcasts ====
CRI offers a list of podcast programs in English:

- Hourly News
- The Beijing Hour
- RoundTable
- Studio Plus
- Today
- Chinese Studio
- More to Read

=== Holiday Broadcasts ===
During major Chinese holidays (dubbed Golden Week), such as Chinese New Year, May Day, and Mid-Autumn Festival, China Radio International typically broadcasts special programmes such as:

- Growing Up In China (during the May Day holiday)

Most of these programmes are not typical of the broadcast during the other parts of the year. The analogy is similar to Christmas music broadcasts in the United States.

=== Olympic Radio ===
In July 2006, CRI launched a new radio station called Olympic Radio at 900 AM in Beijing. This special broadcast was in Mandarin, Korean, English, Russian, French, Spanish, Arabic, Japanese and German 24 hours a day. This service was terminated in late 2008 after the Beijing Olympics and now the frequency 900 AM is occupied by CRI News Radio, which covers only Beijing.

=== CRI Hit FM ===
CRI Hit FM (www.hitfm.cn) was an international music radio station owned by CRI during 1999 and 2025, airing in a Contemporary hit radio format. The station first launched in Beijing through 88.7 FM, later rollout to other major cities such as Shanghai and Guangzhou.

=== Pay television channels ===
Other than radio channels, CRI also operates these pay television channels via satellite airing:

- Shark Shopping (聚鲨环球精选) (de facto free channel in several local DTV networks)
- Global Sightseeing (环球奇观)
- China Communication (中国交通) (co-operate with Ministry of Transport)

== Languages ==
China Radio International broadcasts in the following languages:

Language	Launched	Website
Albanian		Radio e Jashtme e Kinës
Arabic		http://arabic.cri.cn
Armenian	12 April 2011	
Belarusian	23 September 2009	http://belarusian.cri.cn
Bengali		http://bengali.cri.cn
Bulgarian		http://bulgarian.cri.cn
Burmese	10 April 1950	http://myanmar.cri.cn
Croatian		Kineski Radio Internacional
Cambodian	11 December 2008	http://cambodian.cri.cn
Cantonese		
Czech		http://czech.cri.cn
Dutch	23 September 2009	
English	11 September 1947	http://english.cri.cn
Esperanto	19 December 1964	http://esperanto.cri.cn
Estonian		
Filipino		Radyo Internasyonal ng Tsina
French	5 June 1958	http://french.cri.cn
German	15 April 1960	Radio China International
Greek	23 September 2009	http://greek.cri.cn
Hausa		http://hausa.cri.cn
Hebrew	23 September 2009	http://hebrew.cri.cn
Hindi	15 March 1959	http://hindi.cri.cn
Hungarian		http://hungarian.cri.cn
Indonesian		Radio Internasional Tiongkok
Italian		Radio Cina Internazionale
Japanese	3 December 1941	
Kazakh		https://web.archive.org/web/20170908052146/http://kazak.cri.cn/
Korean	2 July 1950	http://korean.cri.cn/
Laotian	20 November 2006	http://laos.cri.cn
Malay		Radio Antarabangsa China
Mandarin		
Mongolian	1 December 1964	Хятадын олон улсын радио
Nepali	25 Jun 1975	http://nepal.cri.cn
Persian		http://persian.cri.cn
Polish		Chińskie Radio Międzynarodowe
Portuguese		http://portuguese.cri.cn
Pashto		http://pushtu.cri.cn
Romanian	30 August 1968	Radio China Internaţional
Russian	24 December 1954	Международное радио Китая
Serbian		http://serbian.cri.cn
Sinhala	January 1975	http://sinhalese.cri.cn
Spanish	3 September 1956	http://espanol.cri.cn
Swahili	6 March 2006	http://swahili.cri.cn
Swedish		
Tamil	August 1963	சீன வானொலி
Thai		http://thai.cri.cn
Tibetan		https://web.archive.org/web/20190224113849/http://tibet.cri.cn/
Turkish		http://turkish.cri.cn
Ukrainian	May 2008	Міжнародне радіо Китаю
Urdu		http://urdu.cri.cn
Uygur		https://web.archive.org/web/20180116173813/http://uygur.cri.cn/
Vietnamese		Đài phát thanh quốc tế Trung Quốc

== Joint ventures ==
=== China International Broadcasting Network ===
China International Broadcasting Network (CIBN, traded as Chinese: 国广东方网络(北京)有限公司, an internet TV service, was a joint venture of China Radio International with other companies. The company was owned by Global Broadcasting Media Group (Chinese: 国广环球传媒控股有限公司, a joint venture (50–50) of China Radio International and Chinese: 金正源联合投资控股有限公司, literally JinZhengYuan Union Investment Holding) for 34.0004% stake, Huawen Media Investment for 30.9996% stake, a subsidiary (Chinese: 桂林东方时代投资有限公司) of listed company Oriental Times Media (Chinese: 东方时代网络传媒股份有限公司) for 15% stake, the operator of Youku (Chinese: 合一信息技术（北京）有限公司) for 10% stake and Suning Holdings Group, the parent company of PPTV for 10% stake.

=== GBTimes ===
CRI owns 60% of Finland-based GBTimes. GBTimes is headed by Zhao Yinong and operates radio stations across Europe that broadcast CRI-produced content.

=== G&E Studio ===
G&E Studio is 60% owned by Guoguang Century Media, a Beijing firm completely owned by the CRI. James Su is president and CEO of G&E Studio, which distributes CRI content to more than a dozen radio stations inside the United States.

== See also ==
- China Media Group ("Voice of China")
  - China National Radio
  - China Central Television
    - China Global Television Network
- International broadcasting
  - Radio Taiwan International (formerly "Voice of Free China")
