= List of China Media Group channels =

List of Chinese state-controlled media channels

Broadcast since 1 May 1958 as China Central Television (CCTV), CMG has a total of 49 television channels as of February 2021, consisting of 26 free channels, 17 pay channels and 6 foreign channels, making CMG the world's largest number of TV channels operated by a single television network. All CMG channels are broadcasting around the world through satellite, cable and on Internet television. Those channels are listed below in sequence of launch day.

== Television channels ==
=== Free public channels ===
All channels below are using Mandarin Chinese, with some news-related programmes showing sign language on the bottom-left or bottom-right.

| Name | Format | Launch date | Slogan | Note |
|---|---|---|---|---|
| CCTV-1 | SD: PAL 576i 16:9 (extruded) HD: 1080i UHD: 2160p | 3 September 1958 (SD) 28 September 2009 (HD) | - | The first TV channel of People's Republic of China, renamed to China Central Television on 1 May 1978, defined as CCTV-1 during launching of CCTV-2, and renamed to CCTV General when launch of CCTV-13. |
| CCTV-2 | SD: PAL 576i 16:9 (extruded) HD: 1080i UHD: 2160p | 1 May 1973 (SD) 1 January 2014 (HD) | 财经频道，看见价值 (Finance Channel, See the Value) | The first color TV channel of People's Republic of China, at the earlier test launch era, the programmes are related to education, later for economical. |
| CCTV-3 | SD: PAL 576i 16:9 (extruded) HD: 1080i UHD: 2160p | 1 January 1986 (SD) 28 September 2012 (HD) | 艺启欢笑 艺起发光 (Together for Laughter, Together for Light) | |
| CCTV-4 | SD: PAL 576i 16:9 (extruded) HD: 1080i UHD: 2160p | 1 October 1992 (SD) 15 April 2015 (HD, Asian Edition) 5 February 2016 (HD, European Edition) 20 February 2017 (HD, American Edition) | 传承中华文明 服务全球华人 (Inheriting Chinese Civilization, Serving Global Chinese) | Was general television for culture. Was having English and Cantonese programmes before 2006, channel signal split to 3 edition (Asian, European and American) in 2006, bilingual captions available since 2009 for dramas. |
| CCTV-5 | SD: PAL 576i 16:9 (extruded) HD: 1080i UHD: 2160p | 1 January 1995 (SD) 28 September 2012 (HD) | | May temporarily rename to Olympic channel during Olympic Games, before launch of CCTV-16 |
| CCTV-6 | SD: PAL 576i 16:9 (extruded) HD: 1080i UHD: 2160p | 1 January 1996 (SD) 15 December 2012 (HD) | 打开电视看电影 (Watch Movies on TV) | Owned by PDCCP, co-operate by China Film Group Corporation |
| CCTV-7 | SD: PAL 576i 16:9 (extruded) HD: 1080i UHD: 2160p | 30 November 1995 (SD) 1 January 2014 (HD) | - | |
| CCTV-8 | SD: PAL 576i 16:9 (extruded) HD: 1080i UHD: 2160p | 1 January 1996 (SD) 28 September 2012 (HD) | - | |
| CCTV-9 | SD: PAL 576i 16:9 (extruded) HD: 1080i UHD: 2160p | 1 January 2011 (SD) 1 January 2014 (HD) | 记录，天地之间 (Documenting the World) | On 31 December 2016, the CCTV Documentary International has re-packaged to be CGTN Documentary |
| CCTV-10 | SD: PAL 576i 16:9 (extruded) HD: 1080i UHD: 2160p | 9 July 2001 (SD) 1 January 2014 (HD) | 知识，就是力量 (Knowledge Is Power) | |
| CCTV-11 | SD: PAL 576i 16:9 (extruded) HD: 1080i UHD: 2160p | 9 July 2001 (SD) 1 September 2018 (HD) | - | |
| CCTV-12 | SD: PAL 576i 16:9 (extruded) HD: 1080i UHD: 2160p | 12 May 2002 (SD) 1 January 2014 (HD) | 方圆之间，自有天地 (Within Bounds, a World Exists) | |
| CCTV-13 | SD: PAL 576i 16:9 (extruded) HD: 1080i UHD: 2160p | 1 May 2003 (SD) 20 November 2019 (HD) | - | |
| CCTV-14 | SD: PAL 576i 16:9 (extruded) HD: 1080i UHD: 2160p | 28 December 2003 (SD) 1 January 2014 (HD) | - | |
| CCTV-15 | SD: PAL 576i 16:9 (extruded) HD: 1080i UHD: 2160p | 29 March 2004 (SD) 1 September 2018 (HD) | - | |
| CCTV-16 | SD: PAL 576i 16:9 (extruded) HD: 1080i UHD: 2160p | 23 August 2000 | 天天奥林匹克 (Olympics Every Day) | Co-operate by the office of IOC in Beijing, mostly air in HD and 4K UHD, SD edition only available in some local cable transmitters. |
| CCTV-17 | SD: PAL 576i 16:9 (extruded) HD: 1080i UHD: 2160p | 28 December 2003 (SD) 1 January 2014 (HD) | 乡村振兴，一起同行 (Rural Revitalization, Moving Forward Together) | |
| CCTV-5+ | HD: 1080i | 1 January 2006 | - | Renamed to CCTV-HD in 2008, and renamed to CCTV-5+ in August 2013. |
| CCTV-4K | 4K UHD: 2160p | 1 October 2018 | - | |
| CCTV-8K | 8K UHD: 4320p | 24 January 2022 | - | Trial started on 1 February 2021. |
| CCTV Home Shopping | HD: 1080i 16:9 | 28 December 2006 (SD) 23 September 2019 (HD) | - | |

=== Foreign channels ===
| Name | Language | Format | Launch date | Slogan | Note |
|---|---|---|---|---|---|
| CGTN | English | SD: PAL 576i 16:9 (extruded) HD: 1080i | 20 September 1997 (SD) 1 September 2016 (HD) | See the difference | Former CCTV-9 before 26 April 2010, renamed to CGTN on 31 December 2016. |
| CGTN Español | Spanish | SD: PAL 576i 16:9 (extruded) HD: 1080i | 1 October 2004 (SD) 11 April 2014 (HD) | | Split on 1 October 2007. |
| CGTN Français | French | SD: PAL 576i 16:9 (extruded) HD: 1080i | 1 October 2004 (SD) 11 April 2014 (HD) | Regard de la Chine (lit. Focus China) | Split on 1 October 2007. |
| CGTN العربية | Arabic | SD: PAL 576i 16:9 (extruded) HD: 1080i | 25 July 2009 (SD) 18 April 2014 (HD) | | |
| CGTN Pусский | Russian | SD: PAL 576i 16:9 (extruded) HD: 1080i | 10 September 2009 (SD) 18 April 2014 (HD) | Видеть мир иначе! (lit. See the difference!) | |
| CGTN Documentary | English | SD: PAL 576i 16:9 (extruded) HD: 1080i | 1 January 2011 (SD) 7 January 2014 (HD) | See the Changes | |

=== Pay channels ===
All channels below are using Mandarin Chinese. The previous 13 channels are owned by Central Digital Television Media Co., Ltd., their HD signals were launched on 23 September 2019, and their SD signals were shut down in 2020. The last 3 channels are owned by CND Films.

| Name | Format | Launch date | Note |
|---|---|---|---|
| TV Guide | HD: 1080i 16:9 | 1 November 2004 | De facto free for some local cable transmitters. |
| Storm Football | HD: 1080i 16:9 | 1 January 2004 | |
| Women's Fashion | HD: 1080i 16:9 | 1 January 2004 | |
| Hygiene and Healthy | HD: 1080i 16:9 | 1 January 2004 | Was co-operate by SMG. |
| The First Theater | HD: 1080i 16:9 | 9 August 2004 | HBO programmes available in golden times. |
| Storm Theater | HD: 1080i 16:9 | 9 August 2004 | |
| Storm Music | HD: 1080i 16:9 | 9 August 2004 | |
| Nostalgia Theater | HD: 1080i 16:9 | 1 November 2004 | |
| Golf and Tennis | HD: 1080i 16:9 | 1 January 2005 | |
| Cultural Features | HD: 1080i 16:9 | 1 January 2005 | |
| World Geography | HD: 1080i 16:9 | 14 March 2005 | |
| Billiards | HD: 1080i 16:9 | 6 May 2012 | |
| Weapon Technology | HD: 1080i 16:9 | 8 May 2006 | |
| Old Stories | SD: 576i 4:3 | 8 August 2005 | |
| Discovery | SD: 576i 4:3 | 1 January 2007 | |
| Middle Students | SD: 576i 4:3 | 4 May 2009 | |

=== Overseas channels ===
None of channels below are available for subscribers within mainland China.

| Name | Language | Format | Launch date | Note |
|---|---|---|---|---|
| Daifu | Standard Chinese and Japanese | SD: PAL 576i 16:9 (extruded) HD: 1080i | 27 May 1998 (SD) 1 June 2014 (HD) | Japanese edition of CCTV-4, available in Sky PerfecTV!. |
| CCTV Entertainment | Standard Chinese | SD: PAL 576i 16:9 | 1 October 2004 | Overseas edition of CCTV-3. |
| CCTV Chinese Opera | Standard Chinese | SD: PAL 576i 16:9 | 1 October 2004 | Overseas edition of CCTV-11. |
| CCTV-1 Hong Kong & Macau Edition | Standard Chinese and Cantonese | SD: PAL 576i 16:9 (pure) HD: 1080i | 1 March 2011 (SD) 29 May 2017 (HD) | For both: Due to copyright and trademark concerns, all advertisements and some programmes of original CCTV-1 are censored, and replaced by local, mainly Cantonese-speaking, advertisements and other news programmes. Hong Kong Edition: Was transmitted by ATV before 1 April 2015, later de facto only available for some pay channel networks, such as now TV 541, until 23 May 2017 where RTHK took over the channel spectrum as RTHK33. Macau Edition: Transmitted by TDM, was using original CCTV-1 spectrum during 20 December 2016 through 29 May 2017. |

=== Former channels ===
- China 3D TV Test Channel - a television channel broadcasting various digital 3D television content.
- CCTV High Definition Test - The first HDTV channel in the Great China area, as well as the world's first Chinese-speaking HDTV channel, launched on 1 October 1999, closed date 2013
- CCTV Security information - pay channel
- Universe Satellite Network
- GalaxySatellite (TM)
- plus an additional 10+ advanced integration satellite providers if possible

== International broadcasts ==
It is possible to receive channels CCTV-4 (Mandarin channel targeting an overseas Chinese audience), CGTN (English channel targeting an Foreigner audience), CGTN Spanish (in Spanish) and CGTN French (in French) outside China by using a Digital Video Broadcast signal (plus additional broadcast support together with Dolby Stereo, Dolby Surround, Dolby SR, Dolby Digital Advanced Sound Quality Definition and Improvement System Support, technologized and developed by Dolby Laboratories, Datasat, and the SDDS for digital audio system supportments). CCTV has just recently switched from analog to DVB primarily due to better signal quality and the ability to charge for reception (about US$10 per year subscription). The overseas channels are widely available across many cable and satellite providers.

== See also ==
- China Global Television Network
- China Network Television
