= List of world news channels =

This is a list of international news channels.

== International ==
International news channel networks with channels in several languages
Network	English	Mandarin Chinese	Hindi	Spanish	French	Standard Arabic	Bengali	Russian	Tamil	Other
Euronews (Europe)	Euronews, Africanews	-	-	Euronews	Euronews, Africanews	-	-	Euronews	-	Albanian, Arabic, Bulgarian, Georgian, German, Greek, Hungarian, Italian, Montenegrin, Persian, Polish, Portuguese, Romanian, Serbian, Turkish
BTV (Bangladesh)	BTV News	-	-	-	-	-	Bangladesh Television	-	-	
CGTN (China)	CGTN, CGTN America, CGTN Africa, CGTN Europe	-	-	CGTN Spanish	CGTN French	CGTN Arabic	-	CGTN Russian	-	Japanese (Bulletin)
PB-DD (India)	DD India and DD Nagaland	-	DD News		-	-	DD Bangla	-	DD Podhigai	DD Urdu in Urdu, DD Assam for Assamese
DW (Germany)	DW english	-	DW Hindi	DW español	-	DW arabic	-	-	DW Tamil	News bulletins in numerous languages aired by foreign networks
IRINN (Iran)	Press TV	-	-	HispanTV	PressTV Français	Al-Alam	-	-	-	Sahar TV (Azeri)
IRNA (Iran)	News Agency in english	-	-	-	-	IRNA Arabic عربي	-	-	-	
France 24 (France)	France 24 in english	-	-	France 24 en español	France 24	France 24 Arabic عربي	-	-	-	
CNN (US)	CNN International, CNNj(Japan), CNN-News18 (India)	-	-	CNN en Español, CNN Chile	-	CNN Arabic	-	-	-	CNN Indonesia (Indonesian), CNN Brasil (Brazilian Portuguese), CNN Portugal (Portuguese), CNN Türk (Turkish), CNN Prima News (Czech), Antena 3 CNN (Romanian), A2 CNN (Albanian)
RT (Russia)	RT International, RT America, RT UK, RT India	-	-	RT Spanish	RT Français	RT Arabic	-	-	-	RT DE (German), RT Balkan (Serbian)
TASS (Russia)	News Agency in english	-	-	-	-	-	-	-	-	TACC
BBC News (UK)	BBC News (international)	-	BBC News Hindi	-	-	BBC News Arabic	-	News bulletin for TV Rain channel		News bulletins in Urdu, Pashto and other languages and BBC News Persian
i24NEWS (Israel, France)	i24NEWS English	-	-	Weekly Spanish news bulletin at i24NEWS English	i24NEWS français	i24NEWS Arabic	-	-		-
TRT Haber (Turkey)	TRT World	-	-	-	-	TRT Al Arabiya	-	-		TRT Avaz (Bosnian and various Turkic languages with subtitles in Turkish), TRT Türk, TRT Deutsch
Al Jazeera (Qatar)	Al Jazeera English	-	-	-	-	Al Jazeera Arabic	-	-		Al Jazeera Balkans (Bosnian/Serbian/Croatian); Al Jazeera Urdu (launch cancelled); Al Jazeera Türk (launch cancelled)
Sky News (UK)	Sky News (International)	-	-	-	-	Sky News Arabia	-	-	-	Sky TG24 (Italian)
Zee Media Corporation (India)	WION	-	Zee News, Zee Hindustan	-	-	-	Zee 24 Ghanta	-	Zee Tamil News	Zee Salaam in Urdu, Zee 24 Taas in Marathi language, Zee 24 Kalak in Gujarati language, Zee telugu news in Telugu language, Zee Odisha in Odia language, Zee Punjab Haryana Himachal in Punjabi language
Al Arabiya (Saudi Arabia)	Al Arabiya English	-	-	-	-	Al Arabiya	-	-	-	Planned: Spanish & French
NHK World-Japan	NHK World-Japan	-	-	-	-	-	-	-	-	-
CNC World (China)	CNC World	-	-	-	-	-	-	-	-	-
TVP Info (Poland)	TVP World	-	-	-	-	-	-	-	-	Belsat TV (Belarusian)

By annual budget
Channel	Country	Annual budget	Year	References
Voice of America	USA	$355.87 million	2015	
Deutsche Welle	Germany	$320 million	2010	
Doordarshan	India	$127 million	2009	
France 24	France	$123 million	2010	
VOXAFRICA	Africa	$110 million	2016	
BBC News (international)	United Kingdom	$80 million	2016	
RT	Russia	$77 million	2007	

== Others aimed at international audiences ==
Listed below are other news channels aimed specifically at an international audience:

- Japan: NHK World-Japan
- United Kingdom: Sky News, Sky News Australia, Sky News Arabia
- Singapore: CNA
- South Korea: Arirang TV
- Taiwan: TaiwanPlus (stylized as Taiwan+)
- US: Voice of America, CurrentTime TV(Russian), Alhurra (Arabic), TV Martí (Spanish) Bloomberg Television
- India: NDTV, India Today, Mirror Now, NewsX, Republic World, Times Now, DD India
- Pan-African: Al-Qahera News, Nile News (Arabic), Africanews, Africa 24, Presse Africaine, Africable (French), A24 news channel, Arise News, Africa Independent Television, TVC News (English). RTP África (Portuguese)
- South Africa: eNCA, SABC News, Newzroom Afrika

== Channels for domestic and diasporic audiences ==
The following are generalist channels, encompassing news, entertainment and sports which are aimed at audiences both domestic and those abroad that speak the relevant language. Most of these are spin-offs of domestic channels, rearranged and refurbished for international broadcasting, in respective national languages.

- Argentina: América Internacional, Telefe Internacional, El Trece Internacional, Televisión Pública Internacional, TyC Sports Internacional, Encuentro Internacional, TN Internacional
- Australia: ABC Australia
- Austria: ORF 2 Europe
- Bolivia: Bolivia TV Internacional
- Brazil: TV Brasil Internacional, TV Globo Internacional, Record Internacional, Band Internacional, SBT Internacional
- Bulgaria: BNT 4
- Chile: TV Chile, 13 Internacional
- Colombia: Caracol Internacional, RCN Nuestra Tele Internacional
- China: CCTV-4, Phoenix North America Chinese Channel
- Croatia: HRT International, RTL Croatia World
- Cuba: Cubavision International
- Czech Republic: Nova International
- Ecuador: Ecuavisa Internacional, Ecuador TV Internacional, TC Internacional, ECDF Internacional
- Egypt: Nile TV International
- Finland: TV Finland
- France, francophone Canada, Belgium, Switzerland: TV5Monde
- Germany: Arte, Welt
- Greece: ERT Cosmos
- Hong Kong: TVB News
- Hungary: Duna World
- India: DD India
- Indonesia: TVRI World
- Italy: Rai Italia, Mediaset Italia
- Japan: NHK World Premium
- Kazakhstan: Kazakh TV
- South Korea: KBS World
- Lithuania: LRT Lituanica
- Macedonia: MRT Sat
- Malaysia: TV1, Berita RTM, RTM WORLD
- Mexico: Las Estrellas Internacional, Azteca Internacional, Canal Once Internacional, Canal 22 Internacional
- Moldova: TV Moldova Internațional
- Montenegro: TVCG Sat
- Netherlands, Flanders: BVN
- Pakistan: PTV Global
- Philippines: The Filipino Channel, GMA Pinoy TV, Kapatid Channel International
- Poland: TVP Polonia, Polsat 2, Polsat 1, TVN International, TVN International Extra
- Puerto Rico: Telemundo Internacional
- Peru: TV Perú Internacional, Perú Mágico, América TV Internacional, Sur Perú
- Portugal: RTP Mundo, TVI Internacional, SIC Internacional
- Qatar: Al Jazeera
- Romania: TVRi
- Russia: RTR-Planeta
- Serbia: RTS Svet
- Singapore: Singapore International Television, TCS International, CNA, Channel 8i
- Spain: TVE Internacional, Antena 3 Internacional, Atreseries Internacional, Star, ETB Basque, TV3CAT, TVG, Canal Sur Andalucía, Telemadrid INT, Televisión Canaria Internacional, IB3 Global, Aragón Internacional, Canal Extremadura SAT
- Sweden: SVT1, SVT2
- Slovakia: Markíza International
- Thailand: NBT WORLD
- Turkey: TRT Türk, TRT World
- Ukraine: 1+1 International
- UK: British Forces Broadcasting Service (for army and navy abroad)
- US: American Forces Network (for army and navy abroad), CNBC World, Fox News International, Fox Business International, NBA TV International
- Uruguay: Canal 4 Internacional
- Vietnam: VTV4, Vietnam Today

== See also ==
- List of news television channels
