= CGTN (disambiguation) =

China Global Television Network is a state-owned broadcaster of the People's Republic of China.

CGTN channels include:

- CGTN (TV channel), the English-language news channel.
- CGTN Documentary, the English-language documentary channel.
- CGTN Spanish, the Spanish-language news channel.
- CGTN Arabic, the Arabic-language news channel.
- CGTN French, the French-language news channel.
- CGTN Russian, the Russian-language news channel.
