= CCTV International =

CCTV International may refer to:

- CCTV-4, CCTV International in the Mandarin language
- CCTV News (English), CCTV International in the English language
- CCTV International Spanish
- CCTV International French
- CCTV International Russian
- CCTV International Arabic
