= China Today (TV program) =

Chinese TV news program

- Country of origin: China

Original release
- Network: CCTV-9

China Today is a news program that focuses on news issues and current affairs around China. China Today 30 minute's episodes are broadcast on CCTV-9 at 22:00 China Standard Time (UTC+8), or 14:00 UTC every day, and rebroadcasts twice at 01:00 and 07:00 UTC+8 the next morning, or 17:00 and 23:00 UTC.

The Sunday edition of China Today is called China This Week, which takes a look back at major issues happen around the country within the previous 6 days. All of China Today's programs are available on CCTV's English website.

From April 26, 2010, China Today was replaced by a new program China 24 since the CCTV-9 was changed to "CCTV News".

== Overview ==
The main sources of China Today are news programs previously broadcast within the day in CCTV's News Channel and CCTV 4, the international service in Chinese. This is because all the news programs of CCTV have to share the same agenda.

CCTV's Chinese and English news services have very different writing and editing styles. Therefore, China Today's reporters usually use archive pictures, international news agencies and China's local televisions' news feeds to expand the stories with a style that is more fluent, professional and acceptable for western audience.

Unlikely other news production teams of CCTV-9, China Today is only in charge of one broadcasting in a day. This brings its reporters more time and energy to make their stories more interesting and of a better quality.

== Staff ==
Zhang Ling is the producer and regular presenter of the show, James Chau, Yu Ze, Vimbayi Kajese, Li Dongning, Wei Sue Loke and some other hosts or hostesses on CCTV International (CCTV-9) also present the show, with Wang Xiqing, Yuan xiaoyuan, Ren Ting directing. Yuan qifei, Shen Le, Qian Fang report, and the show is edited by Sun Li and Niu Bing. Wang Dong is responsible for special visual effects needed in some of the reports.

== Visual design ==
The current opening and headline sequences of China Today are designed by Fox News of the United States. The logo music is also a re-composed version with an emphasis on the erhu, a Chinese traditional musical instrument.

The studio's background is designed by CCTV-9's own graphic staff.
