= Television in Laos =

Laos was a latecomer to television, the last country in Indochina and the Southeast Asian region to do so.

== History ==
Before the creation of a national network, also before Laos became a communist state, signals from Thailand were easily received in border areas. Lao National Television was established on December 1, 1983 with two days of programming a week, with Soviet support, while facing a number of technical, geographic and economic problems.

LNTV held a monopoly until 2008 when the first private channel, Lao Star Television, was created. The amount of private channels grew starting in the early 2010s with three satellite channels appearing successively: Lao PSTV in 2011, followed by MV Lao and TV Lao in 2012. The Defense Ministry opened its channel, Lao Army TV (Channel 7) on September 9, 2020.

== Analog terrestrial television ==
As of 2017, Laos carried LNTV1, LNTV3 and a relay station of VTV4 on the VHF band, while the private channel MV Lao and rebroadcasts of CCTV-4 and CGTN were available on UHF.

== Cable television ==
The first cable TV network opened in 1998. As of 2017, the cable services were dominated by two system operators, while the overall total of subscribers was 1.5 million. Analog cable was still prevalent at the time, carrying over 50 channels, and were struggling to convert to digital.

Lao Cable Television was established in 2002, when the government inked a partnership with Chinese company Yang Ching Sung Tu Electrical, which holds 85% of the shares.

== Satellite television ==
InfoSat-Laos started offering its service in October 2016. As of 2022, it was carrying over 100 channels. Also launched in 2016 is Laosat, with over 180 channels, and with the backing of a Chinese company.

== Digital terrestrial television ==
Lao Digital TV was created per a 2006 ASEAN resolution and started offering its services in November 2007, as a three-way joint-venture between LNTV, Yunnan Television and Lao Technology Development. LDTV offers over 50 channels, including foreign channels (Chinese, Thai, Vietnamese). As of 2022, it was available in Vientiane and three provinces. LDTV employs the Chinese DTMB standard.
