= Daifu =

Japanese media company

Daifu Co., Ltd. (株式会社大富, Kabushiki-kaisha Daifu) is the owner of two Japanese television channels (Daifu Channel and Phoenix TV Japan) catering the Chinese diaspora in the country. Founded in 1998, it also deepens "Japanese people's understanding of China and the Chinese people" and plays a role in the establishment of friendly bilateral China–Japan relations. In addition to its television channels, it also conducts video production, newspaper and magazine publishing, coordination, and communications services.

== History ==
Daifu was established on February 20, 1998 with the aim of establishing what would become its flagship channel, Daifu Channel, by arranging a contract with China Central Television to relay part of CCTV-4's programs and add Japanese productions to cater the needs of the Chinese in Japan. The name Daifu is a contraction of two of its founding shareholders: Dai (大 on reading "dai") from Ōkura Zaibatsu (大倉商事) and Fu (富) from Fuji (富士, as in Fuji Television). A few weeks after CCTV-Daifu started broadcasting, Ōkura was declared bankrupt and the financial structure was partitioned between Dentsu, Fuji Television, Sony, Asatsu-DK and Kyocera.

Daifu published its own newspaper, Daifu News (大富報) in April 1999. Publication ceased in July 2005 after 151 issues. All issues are in the archives of the National Diet Library. On November 20, 2001, Daifu signed a contract with TVB's international arm TVBI to launch TVB Daifu, which started broadcasting on December 1, 2001. In February 2009, it acquired the Japanese version of Phoenix Television from Rakuraku Communications, with its new ownership starting on April 1.

TVB Daifu shut down on September 30, 2011. Daifu decided to cut its prices for the bundle as it was now carrying two channels instead of three.

== Assets ==
=== Television ===
- Daifu Channel is the flagship television channel of the company. It broadcasts programming from China Central Television in Mandarin. Selected programming during primetime hours is carried out in Japanese subtitles. Until 2022, the channel was known as CCTV-Daifu.
- Phoenix TV Japan was acquired by Daifu in 2009 from Rakuraku Communications.

=== Former ===
- TVB Daifu (TVB大富) was a rebroadcast of the now-defunct TVB8 and specialized in programming from Hong Kong broadcaster TVB. The channel gained its viewership base due to Japanese fascination with Hong Kong actors, mainly those who worked at TVB.
