= CGTN America =

American Chinese-run television news channel

- Type: State media
- Country: United States
- Broadcast area: Nationwide
- Network: China Global Television Network
- Headquarters: 1099 New York Avenue NW, Suite 200; Washington, D.C. 20001; U.S.

Programming
- Language: English

Ownership
- Owner: China Media Group

History
- Launched: February 6, 2012; 14 years ago
- Former names: CCTV America

Links
- Webcast: america.cgtn.com
- Website: america.cgtn.com

Availability

Streaming media
- Sling TV: Internet Protocol television

CGTN America is a channel of China Global Television Network (CGTN), the international division of the state-owned media organization China Media Group (CMG), the headquarters of which is in Beijing, China. It is one of six international language news channels run by CGTN, under the control of the Propaganda Department of the Chinese Communist Party. CGTN America is headquartered at 1099 New York Avenue NW, Suite 200 in Washington, D.C., and manages bureaus in New York City, Washington, D.C., as well as spanning coverage in North and South America. CGTN America began broadcasting in the United States on December 31, 2016, replacing the former English language CCTV-NEWS in the region.

CGTN America employs American, Chinese, and other international journalists and produces U.S.-based programs with a focus on Asia for CGTN. It maintains a separate schedule of programs each day from noon to 7 p.m. MST (7 p.m. to 2 a.m. GMT), and like its African counterpart, it simulcasts CGTN International at all other times. CGTN America's director general is Ma Jing, with veteran Asia journalist Jim Laurie as executive consultant.

Observers have noted that the "aim [of CGTN] is to influence public opinion overseas in order to nudge foreign governments into making policies favourable towards China's Communist party" through subtle means. Researchers Thomas Fearon and Usha M. Rodrigues argued that CGTN has a "dichotomous role as a credible media competing for audience attention on the world stage, and a vital government propaganda organ domestically." According to James Palmer at Foreign Policy, the contrasting aims of RT (formerly Russia Today) and CGTN, "mirrors wider strategies: Moscow wants chaos it can exploit, while Beijing wants a stable world order—on its terms".

In 2018, the United States Department of Justice directed CGTN America and Xinhua News Agency to register as foreign agents under the Foreign Agents Registration Act (FARA), which CGTN America did on February 1, 2019 while Xinhua did not register. In 2020, the United States Department of State designated CGTN and its parent company, CCTV, as well as Xinhua, as foreign missions, requiring them to submit lists of all employees and to seek approval to buy any property.

== Controversies and criticism ==
=== Foreign state agent registration ===
CGTN America initially claimed that it had "editorial independence from any state direction or control". This claim was debunked by The New York Times reporter Paul Mozur in interviews with "current and former CGTN employees [who] say CCTV editors in Beijing often dictated plans for covering China. American employees sometimes pushed back, they said, and Ms. Ma allowed some flexibility when Beijing's orders didn't specifically forbid or dictate content. But three people interviewed said they had little choice but to air propaganda clips when Beijing said so". CGTN employees were disciplined when a news report mentioned Falun Gong, the religious group labeled as a cult and banned by the PRC. The Flag of the Republic of China, which the PRC does not recognize, is banned from broadcasts. In November 2018, amid growing international criticism of China's imprisonment of hundreds of thousands of Uyghurs in re-education camps, CGTN America aired a pro-Beijing documentary portraying the camps as successful vocational training and anti-terrorism centers and Uyghurs as grateful. In addition, CGTN America has broadcast "exclusive" coerced confessions of people accused of a wide variety of crimes in China, most notably the example of a Briton, Peter Humphrey. In addition, some CGTN journalists "recall being asked to cross a sometimes blurred line between news reporting and intelligence gathering as they were asked to report on high-level government meetings".

The United States Department of State characterized "CGTN America's relationship with a foreign government and a foreign political party as one of interest to Washington". The United States Department of Justice was concerned about an "expanding influence campaign being waged by Beijing through the global arms of state media outlets" like CGTN and Xinhua News Agency. In putting pressure upon Xinhua and CGTN, a senior US official noted that US grievances towards the lack of reciprocity from Beijing on trade and media access as many American and international news outlets are blocked in China.

The Justice Department directed CGTN America and Xinhua News Agency to register as foreign agents under the Foreign Agent Registration Act (FARA). CGTN America registered under FARA on 1 February 2019, but said that it disagreed with the Justice Department's decision, but nevertheless registered as a foreign agent. While this permits CGTN America to continue operating in the United States, it is required to disclose information about its annual budget and ownership structure, and also to include disclaimers on broadcasts, published materials and social media identifying itself as a registered foreign agent.

On March 8, 2019, after CGTN America registered under FARA, its director general Ma Jing and a dozen other staffers were recalled to Beijing. In the FARA filing Ma had said that CGTN America enjoyed editorial independence from any state control and that it operated like other news media organizations. It has been speculated that the recall is a result of her claim of editorial independence, which deviates from the Chinese Communist Party's position.

In 2020, the United States Department of State designated CGTN and its parent company, CCTV, as well as Xinhua News Agency, China Radio International, the distributors of the official People's Daily and English-language China Daily, as foreign missions, requiring them to submit lists of all employees and to seek approval to buy any property.

=== Airing of forced confessions ===
In November 2018, amid growing international criticism of China's imprisonment of hundreds of thousands of Uyghurs in re-education camps, CGTN America aired a piece portraying the camps as successful vocational training and antiterrorism centers and Uyghurs as grateful. In addition, CGTN America has broadcast "exclusive" forced confessions of people accused of a wide variety of crimes in China, most notably the example of a Briton, Peter Humphrey.

== Awards ==
In 2016, CGTN America won an Emmy for a feature on Jen Bricker, a gymnast who was born without legs. In 2019, it won 27 White House News Photographers Association awards for its photographic coverage.
