= Biz China =

Biz China can refer to:

- Biz China (CCTV), a China business news program on CCTV International
- Biz China (CRI), a China business news program on China Radio International
