= Navalny's snow pile =

Political flashmob in Russia

- Part of Russian opposition
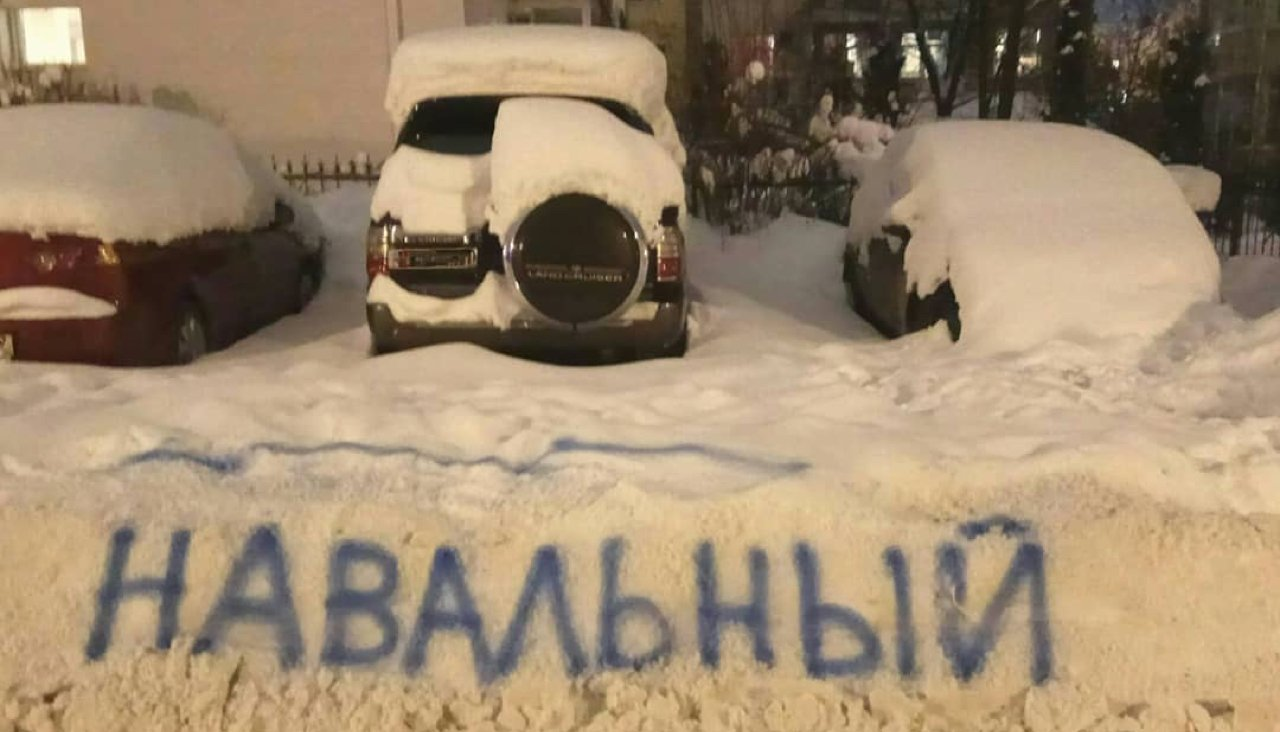
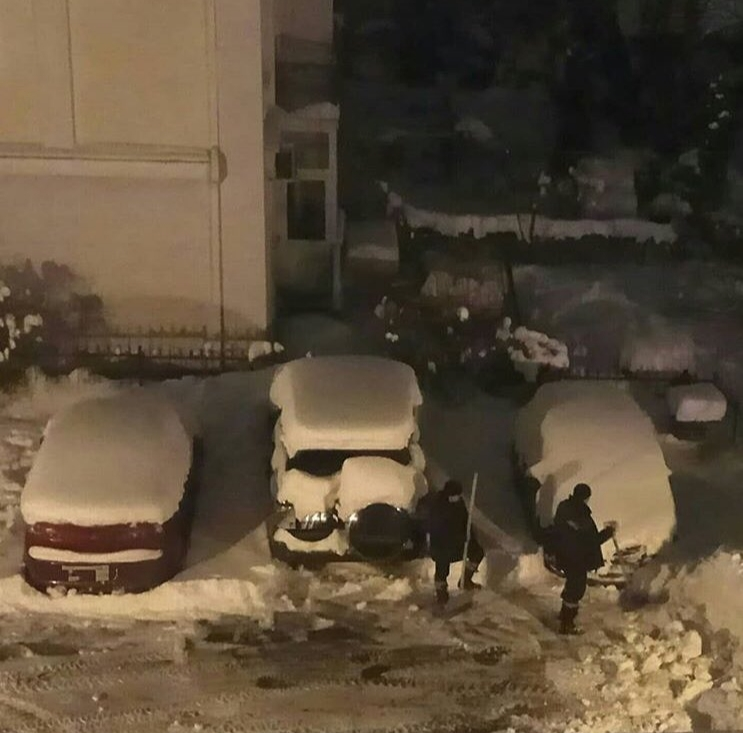
- Inscription "NAVALNY" on snow pile, later removed
- Date: February 2018 — 2021
- Location: Russian Federation
- Methods: Activism
- Result: Limited success: Snow piles partially cleaned; No official statement has been issued; Navalny recognized extremist, criminalizing public mentioning of him without "extremist" label

Parties
Activists; Pro-Navalny activists; Pro-Grudinin activists; Pro-Municipal company responsibility activists	(Russia) Russian Government; Ministry of Construction, Housing and Utilities; Private municipal housing and utilities companies

Lead figures
Yelena Shuvalova; Decentralized	Municipal housing and utilities companies

Number
Unknown	Unknown

Navalny's snow pile, also known as Snow piles fear Navalny is a political flashmob in Russia between 2018 — 2021. The flashmob consisted of Russians writing surname of Alexei Navalny on abandoned snow piles in order to make the municipal administrations — ZhKKh clean them in time. The flashmob's main wave took place after Navalny published a Twitter post mentioning this flashmob.

== Context ==
In February 2018 a record high snowfall fell in Moscow and Moscow Region. Hundreds of trees have crushed on parked cars in Moscow. One person died. Car owners were urged to use public transportation. Moscow Mayor Sergei Sobyanin allowed Moscow schoolchildren to stay home from school on Monday. Snowfalls disrupted operations at the capital's airports. The snowfalls put the Housing and Utilities services on high strain, as only on 4 Feb 2018 utility workers removed 1.2 million cubic meters of snow from the capital's streets.

One of flashmob's inspirations was Vladimir Putin's policy on censorship of Navalny's content and any mentions of him. For example, on February 12, 2018 after Roskomnadzor complaint YouTube demanded the removal of Navalny's broadcast about the investigation into Deripaska, Prikhodko, and Rybka.

According to Tatyana Grigoryeva who started the flashmob, she was inspired by a joking Facebook post of journalist Mikhail Kozyrev, where he ironically called for writing Navalny's name on snow piles in order for them to disappear, because any mention of Navalny on state media was considered inappropriate. President Vladimir Putin himself famously refused to call Mr Navalny by his name, usually referring to him as "that person" when asked about him.

== The flashmob ==
The flashmob started in February 2018, when Tatyana Grigoryeva tried to write Navalny's name on the forgotten snow piles in Moscow. After the snow piles were cleaned she published four photos of the opposition leader painted on snow and later took video of two street cleaners scraping away one of the markings from a pavement. Her video has been viewed more than 47,000 times.

The snow piles flashmob was a series of satirical pro-municipal utility company responsibility civic actions, where citizens wrote the opposition leader's name on uncollected snow piles to force responsible cleaning action. Exploiting the state's strict political censorship of the opposition leader, residents weaponized bureaucratic reflexes to force utility workers to remove the "agitation."

Snowdrifts with the name of Navalny have been spotted in Moscow, Irkutsk, Omsk, Tomsk, Novosibirsk, Nizhny Novgorod, Saratov, Vladivostok, Kirov, Saratov and Yekaterinburg.

As the flashmob evolved, some citizens experimented by writing the names of other politicians, such as the CPRF 2018 Russian presidential election nominee Pavel Grudinin, the effectiveness of Grudinin's surnames turned out to be similar to those with Navalny's surname. Deputy of Moscow City Duma Yelena Shuvalova partook in the trend, calling her supporters to write the surname of Grudinin on the snow piles. In Saratov local residents also painted Putin, Sobchak and Radaev surnames on snow piles.

== Reactions ==
Russian users on the internet created multiple jokes about the flashmob:"What if I write 'NAVALNY' on the floor of a room, will they take it down too?" "What if I write 'NAVALNY' on the city hall, will they tear it down?", "What if I write 'NAVALNY' on the old bridge, what are the chances they'll build a new, decent bridge?", "I wish I could write 'NAVALNY' on my loan debts."

Alexei Navalny himself also mentioned the flashmob multiple times:

"There's an effective way to clear snow, even if you're not a government official, just an ordinary person. It sounds like a joke; I didn't believe it myself at first. Look, in Nizhny Novgorod, there was a huge pile of snow, someone just wrote "Navalny" on it, and it was cleared away in no time. The same thing happened in Kirov, someone was having fun, they wrote "Navalny" as a joke, and the housing and utilities department immediately showed up and cleared it away"

- Alexei Navalny, 2019 on air on Navalny Live

== See also ==
- Rospil
- Party of crooks and thieves
