= Aerial China =

Chinese documentary series

- Genre: Documentary
- Directed by: Yu Le
- Narrated by: Li Longbin (Mandarin version); Trevor Lee Cheuk Him (Cantonese version); Owen Grant (English version)
- Composer: Wang Bei
- Country of origin: China
- Original language: Chinese
- No. of seasons: 4
- No. of episodes: 34

Production
- Camera setup: Multi-camera
- Running time: 50 minutes

Original release
- Network: China Central Television
- Release: January 28, 2017 – November 17, 2022

Aerial China (Chinese: 航拍中国), also known as Bird's-eye China, is a Chinese documentary television series showcasing the country's landscape via only aerial videos. It aimed to consist of a total of 34 episodes and cover all of China’s 23 provinces, five autonomous regions, four municipalities and two special administrative regions.

The first four episodes of the first season was aired in January 2017 on CCTV-9, the rest of the season was aired in March. A second season was aired in 2019 from March 3, 2019 to March 9 on CCTV-1 and CCTV-9. The third season was aired since May 21, 2020 on CCTV-1 and CCTV-9. The fourth season will air since Nov 7, 2022 on CCTV-1 and CCTV-9.

== Episodes ==
=== Season One ===
Episode	Original airdate	Location
1	March 3, 2017	Xinjiang
2	March 4, 2017	Hainan
3	March 5, 2017	Heilongjiang
4	March 6, 2017	Shaanxi
5	March 7, 2017	Jiangxi
6	March 8, 2017	Shanghai

=== Season Two ===
Episode	Original airdate	Location
1	March 3, 2019	Zhejiang
2	March 4, 2019	Sichuan
3	March 5, 2019	Inner Mongolia
4	March 6, 2019	Gansu
5	March 7, 2019	Guangdong
6	March 8, 2019	Fujian
7	March 9, 2019	Jiangsu

=== Season Three ===
Episode	Original airdate	Location
1	May 21, 2020	Yunnan
2	May 22, 2020	Anhui
3	May 23, 2020	Guizhou
4	May 24, 2020	Shandong
5	May 25, 2020	Tianjin
6	May 26, 2020	Shanxi
7	May 27, 2020	Jilin
8	May 28, 2020	Hunan
9	May 29, 2020	Hebei
10	May 30, 2020	Ningxia

=== Season Four ===
Episode	Original airdate	Location
1	November 7, 2022	Beijing
2	November 9, 2022	Guangxi
3	November 9, 2022	Qinghai
4	November 10, 2022	Hubei
5	November 10, 2022	Hong Kong
6	November 11, 2022	Tibet
7	November 11, 2022	Macao
8	November 14, 2022	Chongqing
9	November 14, 2022	Henan
10	December 6, 2022	Liaoning
11	April 29, 2023	Taiwan
