= CGTN Arabic =

Arabic language television channel owned by China Global Television Network

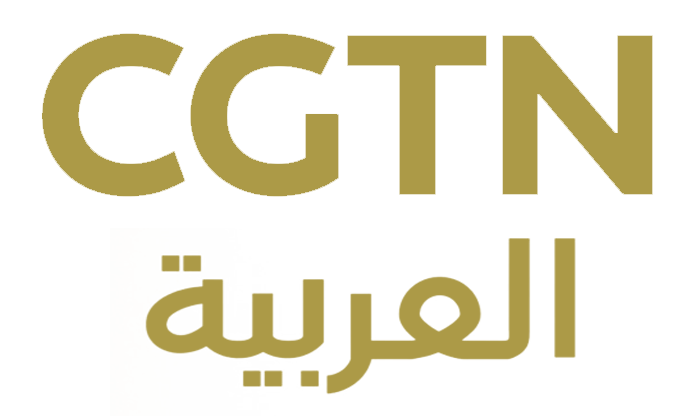
- Logo of the channel starting 2016.
- Type: State media
- Country: China
- Broadcast area: Worldwide
- Headquarters: Beijing, China

Programming
- Language(s): Arabic
- Picture format: HDTV 1080i

Ownership
- Owner: China Global Television Network (subsidiary of China Central Television)
- Sister channels: CGTN; CGTN Spanish; CGTN French; CGTN Russian; CGTN Documentary

History
- Launched: 25 July 2009; 16 years ago
- Former names: CCTV-Arabic (2009–2016)

Links
- Website: arabic.cgtn.com

Availability

Streaming media
- CNTV Ai Bugu (China): arabic.cgtn.com

CGTN Arabic (Arabic: سي جي تي أن العربية), formerly CCTV-Arabic (Arabic: سي سي تي في العربية), is an Arabic language television channel owned by China Global Television Network, a subsidiary of China Central Television.

== History ==
On 25 July 2009, CCTV launched its Arabic-language international channel, stating that it aimed to maintain stronger links with Arabic nations and that the new channel will "serve as an important bridge to strengthen communication and understanding between China and Arab countries". CCTV also had plans for a Russian-language channel, which launched later in the year. The free-to-air channel was open for view to an audience of potentially 300 million in 22 countries, through the use of satellite television.

== Development and funding ==
The South China Morning Post reported that CCTV was prepared to spend 45 billion yuan (US$9.5 billion) into the development of the channel, a claim unconfirmed by official sources.

== Content ==
The channel broadcasts entirely in Arabic, with programs from the four categories of news, feature stories, entertainment and education. Each program is broadcast six times per day, while news reports are regularly updated. The channel will gradually increase the number of programs as it develops.

== See also ==
- CCTV-4 (Chinese)
- CGTN Русский
- CGTN Français
- CGTN Español
- CGTN (TV channel)
- China Network Television (CNTV)
