= CGTN Spanish =

Spanish language entertainment and news channel of China Central Television

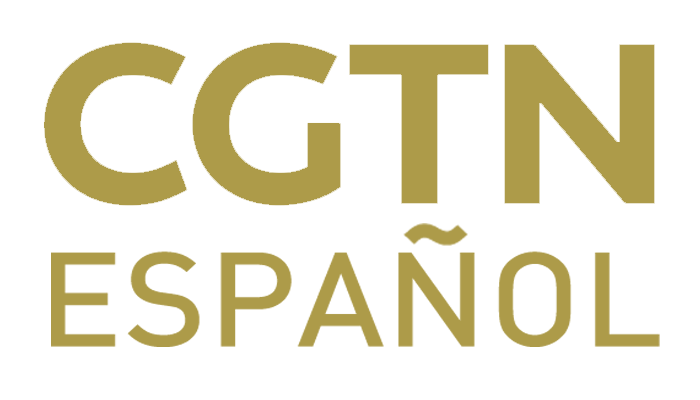
- Type: State media
- Country: China

Programming
- Language(s): Spanish language
- Picture format: 1080i HDTV (downscaled to 576i/480i for the SDTV feed)

Ownership
- Owner: China Central Television

History
- Launched: October 1, 2007; 18 years ago
- Replaced: CCTV-E, CCTV-Español

Links
- Website: espanol.cgtn.com

Availability

Streaming media
- CNTV Ai Bugu: espanol.cgtn.com
- Sling TV: Internet Protocol television

CGTN Spanish (Spanish: CGTN Español, formerly CCTV International Spanish or CCTV-Español and CCTV-E) is the Spanish language entertainment and news channel of China Global Television Network (CGTN), which is part of the state-owned broadcaster China Central Television (CCTV).

== History ==
CGTN Spanish was launched on October 1, 2007, as CCTV-E. It replaced the bi-lingual Spanish / French language CCTV E&F channel which was launched on October 1, 2004.

In 2016 CCTV-E partnered with the Venezuelan state media channel Telesur to co-produce a cultural program called Prisma.

In 2024, CGTN Spanish spread false information about US Supreme Court rulings in what Politico called "escalating play by Beijing to undermine faith in U.S. democracy."

== See also ==
- CCTV-9, documentary
- CCTV-4 (International Chinese)
- CCTV-Русский (International Russian)
- CCTV-Français (International French)
- CCTV-العربية (International Arabic)
- CCTV-NEWS (International English)
- CNTV International
