= Easy FM =

Radio station in Beijing

Beijing; China
- Frequency: 91.5 MHz

History
- Founded: 1 January 1984; 41 years ago (as Radio Beijing's Capital Service); September 2003; 22 years ago (as Easy FM)
- Last air date: 23 December 2025; 0 days' time

Links
- Website: ezfm.cri.cn

Easy FM was a radio station in Beijing, China on 91.5 FM. It is a member of the China Radio International group of radio stations. The programs are mostly in English (some of them being bilingual), while the commercials are in Mandarin Chinese.

The station broadcasts hourly English-language news bulletins alongside a range of talk and music programs.

== History ==
The Easy FM brand was first used in the early 1990s for a single show that was transmitted over various stations throughout mainland China. The Joy FM show continues to operate in this manner. Easy FM's hours were subsequently expanded to become an independent station. It has also occasionally been broadcast over shortwave to fill gaps in CRI's international schedules. Some Easy FM programming is simulcast in Honolulu in the American state of Hawaii over KHCM-AM.

The station went off the air on 23 December 2025. CGTN Radio will replace EZ FM where available.
