= CGTN Africa =

African Chinese-run television news channel

- Type: State media
- Country: China and Africa
- Broadcast area: Worldwide
- Headquarters: Nairobi, Kenya

Programming
- Picture format: 576i (16:9 SDTV); 1080i (16:9 HDTV)

Ownership
- Owner: China Media Group

History
- Launched: 11 January 2012; 14 years ago
- Former names: CCTV Africa

Links
- Website: www.cgtn.com/africa

Availability

Terrestrial
- Digital terrestrial television (Macau): Channel 74

Streaming media
- CNTV Ai Bugu: www.cgtn.com/africa

CGTN Africa is the African division of China Global Television Network (CGTN), the English-language news channel run by Chinese state media outlet China Media Group. It is based in Nairobi and manages bureaux in Lagos, Cairo and Johannesburg, as well as other centres in Africa. The channel was previously known as CCTV Africa.

CGTN Africa employs Kenyan, African and other international journalists and produces African based programs. There are about 100 employees at CGTN Africa, most of them Kenyans.

According to a 2022 study, only 6% of viewers in Kenya, 7% in South Africa and 11% in Nigeria said they watched CGTN Africa at least once a week.

== Programmes ==
- Africa Live – One hour of African news and analysis, with reporting on social, political and economic issues.
- Global Business – Covers Africa's business landscape.
- Sports Scene – A weekly program covers African sports news.
- Talk Africa – a 30-minute weekly talk show that mainly discusses politics and current affairs in Africa.
- Faces of Africa – extraordinary stories about people in Africa.
