= Vimbayi Kajese =

Zimbabwean television presenter

- Born: 1981 (age 44–45)
- Citizenship: Zimbabwe
- Occupation: Journalist
- Employer: CCTV-9
- Notable work: Featured in several esteemed national and international publications.; Invited to present on the TEDGlobal and TEDx stages.; Recognized as a "Young Global Leader"by the World Economic Forum.; Named a "New Generation Leader" by the African Leadership Network.; Declared one of Zimbabwe's "Most Influential Under 40."; Appointed by the Chinese government as a "Special Friendship Envoy and Cultural Ambassador."

Vimbayi Kajese is a Zimbabwean journalist who first came to international attention as a news presenter for China Central Television's CCTV-9 from 2009 to 2011. She was the first African anchorwoman in the station's history, and her success helped pave the way for the network's expanded presence on the continent, and eventual launch of programs like Africa Live from its Nairobi Bureau which was established in 2012.

== Early life ==
Vimbayi Kajese was born in 1981 in Zimbabwe. She spent much of her childhood living abroad, as her parents held diplomatic positions. Raised across Europe, Africa, and North America, she was exposed to diverse cultures and global perspectives from an early age. This international upbringing contributed to her broad worldview and enduring interest in global affairs. Kajese later pursued undergraduate studies in the United States before moving to China in 2006 to undertake a master's degree in International Relations and Diplomacy. In the same year, she began presenting early morning news programs on CCTV-9, the English-language news channel of China Central Television.

== Career ==
Kajese first visited China in 2004, and decided to move to Beijing in 2006. She became one of CCTV-9's early morning news presenters three years later. She also went to North Park Primary School in Mt. Pleasant, Harare. She left CCTV in October 2011, and later began organizing conferences and events aimed at promoting international friendship between various African and Chinese communities, including entrepreneurs and students.

Linda was asked, "What would you like to do next?" She replied

Well I've just started to be an anchor for CCTV-9 but I would love to do an African travel show next. Just anything that combines travel and food.

— Vimbayi, Global Times Published, 2009-12-25
