= Daifu Channel =

Japanese television airing China Central Television's programming

Daifu Channel (大富チャンネル), formerly CCTV-Daifu (CCTV大富), officially known as Chinese TV - Daifu Channel (中国テレビ★大富チャンネル), is the main channel of Daifu, a Japanese television company catering the Chinese diaspora in Japan. The channel airs China Central Television's programming to the Japanese market.

== History ==
Daifu Channel started broadcasting on July 1, 1998. The channel started as a partial calque of CCTV-4, the Chinese international channel, but had local inserts to cater the Chinese diaspora. The channel has been made available on SKY PerfecTV! since its inception. Its programming as of 2003 differed from CCTV-4, which at the time broadcast a single feed running on an 8-hour wheel due to time zone differences. CCTV-Daifu started airing a localized program, Japan News (日本新闻), in 2002, modelled after CCTV-4's China News. In 2017, for the 45th anniversary of Japan's normalization of diplomatic ties with the PRC, it produced China Story (中国故事), which also made it to Fuji TV's documentary slot.

On November 1, 2022, CCTV-Daifu was simply renamed Daifu Channel. The programming mix (CCTV programs and local productions) remained unchanged but the number of subtitled programs was reduced to mainly dramas and primetime news; while other slots which were used for subtitled programming were reconfigured for an all-Chinese format (with no Japanese subtitles). On January 31, 2023, Hikari TV removed the channel.
