= Party of crooks and thieves =

Popular expression used to refer to the ruling United Russia party

A poster that won the Navalny contest "Against the party of crooks and thieves"

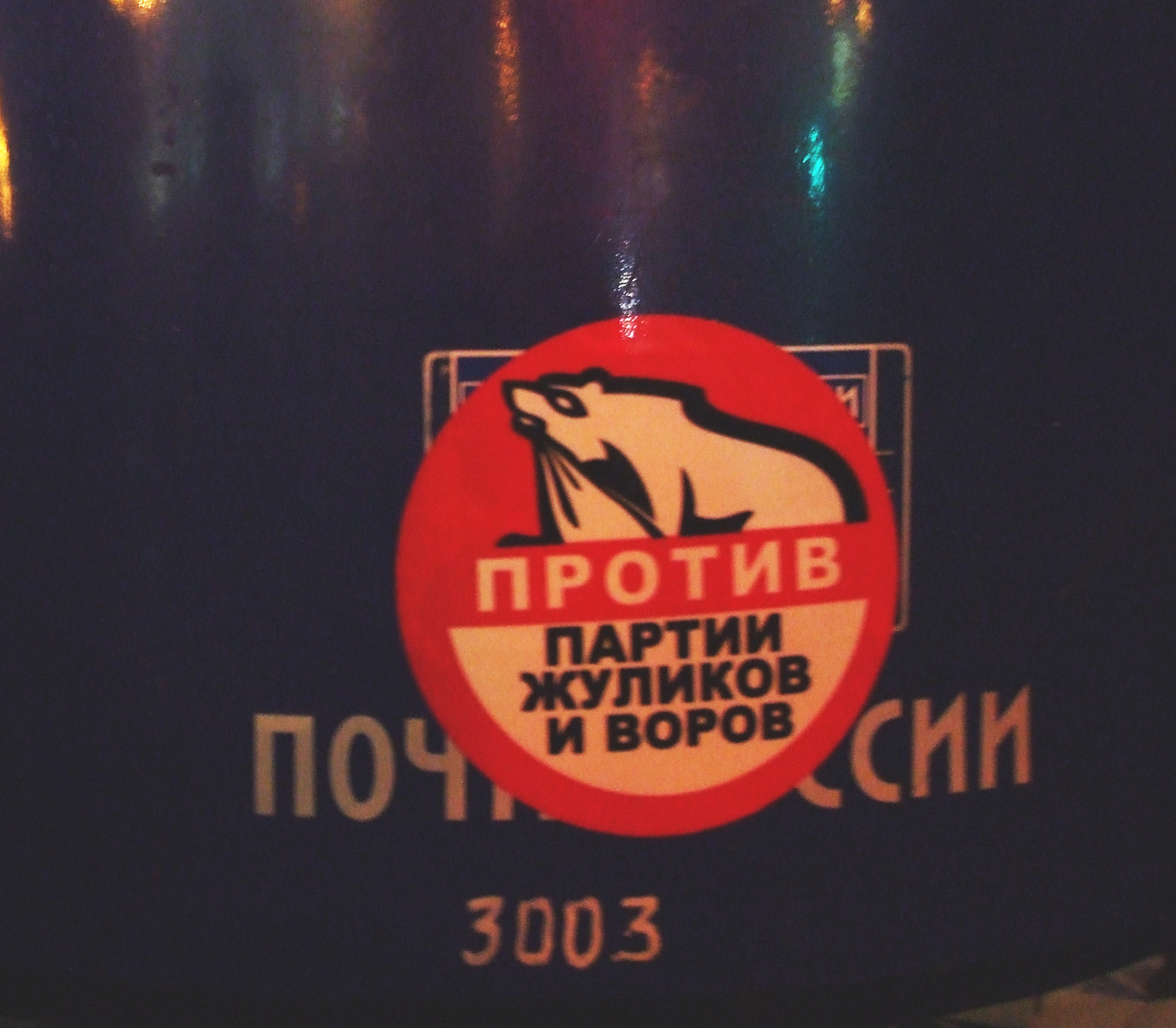
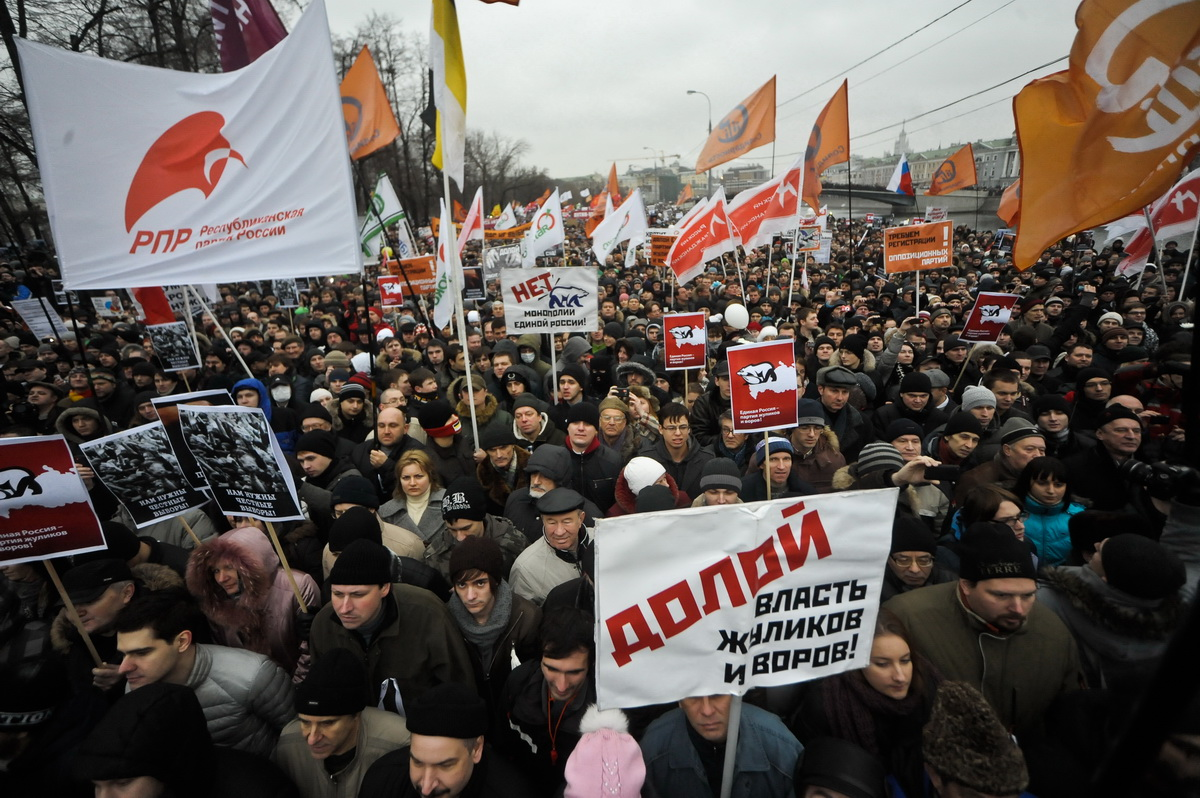
A sticker in Moscow prior to the December 5, 2011 protests reads "Against the party of crooks and thieves" Anti-government protests in Moscow, December 10, 2011. The poster in the foreground reads "Party of crooks and thieves go away!"

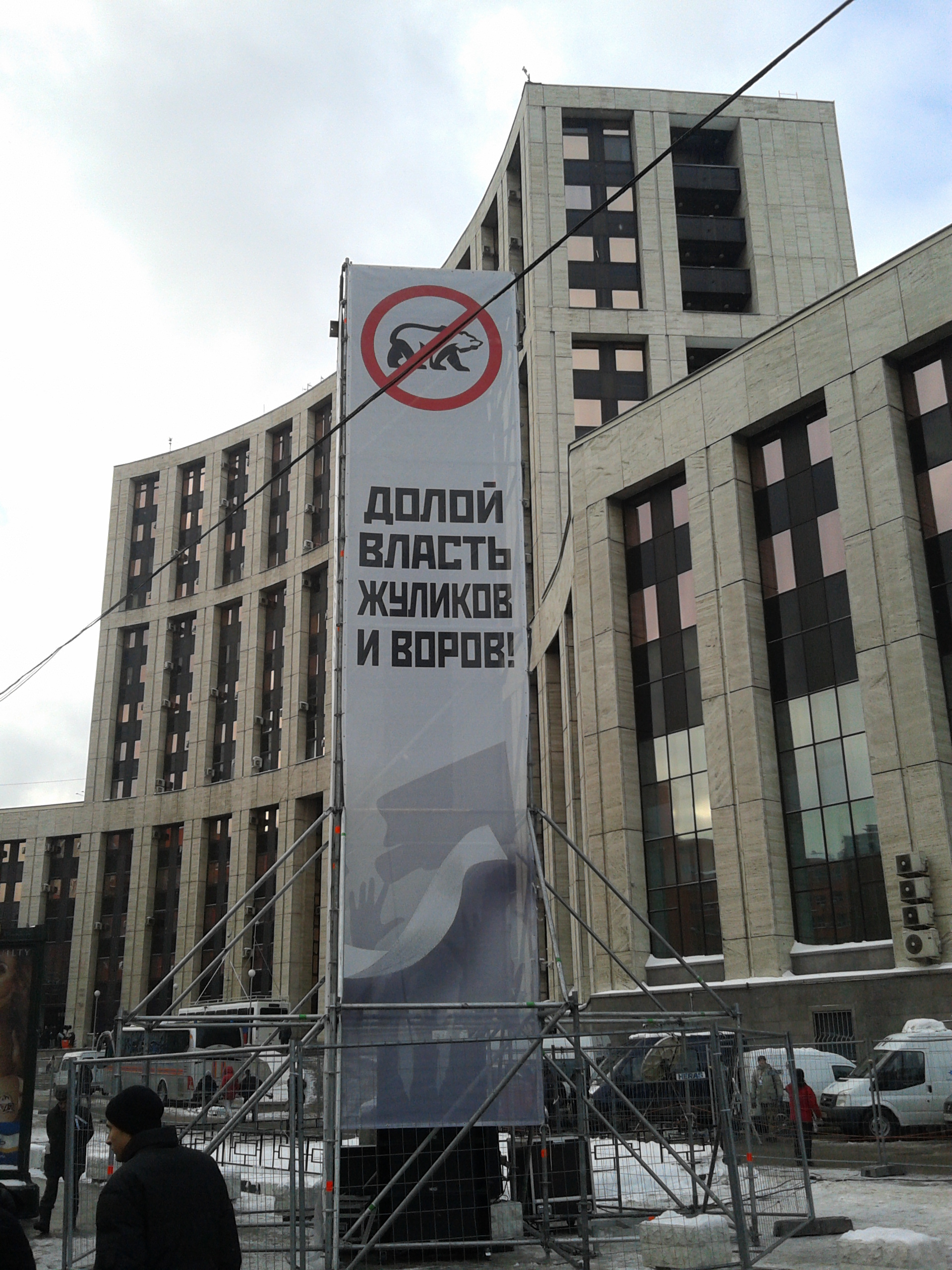
"Down with the power of crooks and thieves!"

"Party of crooks and thieves" (Russian: Партия жуликов и воров, romanized: Partiya zhulikov i vorov, abbr. ПЖиВ, PZhiV) is an expression widely circulating among opposition in Russia which is used to refer to the ruling United Russia party, led by Vladimir Putin. It was coined and popularised by blogger and anti-corruption activist Alexei Navalny in February 2011.

== Origin ==
In 2013, far-right politician Vladimir Zhirinovsky, speaking to Echo of Moscow, claimed to have used this expression in 2009. In 2010, liberal politician Boris Nemtsov, speaking to Radio Liberty, described United Russia as "a party of thieves and corrupt officials".

On February 2, 2011, in an interview with Finam FM radio station, blogger and anti-corruption activist Alexei Navalny responded to the question about United Russia:

I think very poorly of United Russia. United Russia is the party of corruption, the party of crooks and thieves.

The English translation "party of crooks and thieves" first appeared in an article of The New Yorker on April 4, 2011, by Russian-born American journalist Julia Ioffe. The expression was also used by The Economist in October and December 2011.

== Usage ==
The slogan was widely used during the 2011 Russian legislative election campaign by parties and individuals.

Posters, banners, stickers were common during the protests in 2011 and 2012.

The Russian-language division of CGTN, a Chinese state-run media, made a reference to "crooks and thieves" to promote China's efforts to contain corruption in a rap song about the Two Sessions.

== Public opinion ==
A Levada Center survey on July 19, 2011, revealed that 33% of Russians agree that United Russia is a "party of crooks and thieves", while 47% disagreed. Another survey by the same center in June 2012 showed an increase in respondents agreeing with the characterization. Of the total, 47% agreed and 40% disagreed. The latest survey was conducted in April 2013 by Levada Center. For the first time since 2011, it showed the majority of Russians (51%) agreeing with the phrase. At the same poll, 62% of Russians said United Russia members are about "maintaining and strengthening their own power."

In February 2011, Navalny created a poll in his LiveJournal blog in which around 38,000 people participated with over 96% agreeing with the characterization of United Russia as "party of crooks and thieves".

== Reaction from United Russia ==
On October 11, 2011, the Lyublinsky District Court rejected the lawsuit of United Russia member Vladimir Svirid against Navalny.

On November 24, 2011, during a debate on Russia-1 between United Russia and the Liberal Democratic Party, State Duma Member Alexander Khinshtein (a member of United Russia) stated:

United Russia works. It does everything to change the life [standards] in our country. They tell us about a "party of crooks and thieves." I will respond to them. It is better to be in a "party of crooks and thieves" than in a "party of murderers, rapists and robbers."

== See also ==
- Kleptocracy
- List of political slogans
