= CGTN Russian =

Chinese state-run Russian-language news channel

CGTN-Русский
- Type: State media
- Country: People's Republic of China
- Broadcast area: Worldwide
- Headquarters: Beijing, China

Programming
- Language: Russian
- Picture format: HDTV 1080i

History
- Launched: 10 September 2009; 16 years ago
- Former names: CCTV-Русский

Links
- Website: russian.cgtn.com

CGTN Russian (formerly CCTV International Russian (Russian: Центральное Телевидение Китая Международный канал на Pусском языке, Tsentral'noye Televideniye Kitaya Mezhdunarodnyy kanal na Russkom yazyke), Chinese: 中国国际电视台俄语频道; pinyin: Zhōngguó guójì diànshìtái Éyǔ píndào; often shorted as CCTV-Русский) is a Russian language international news, entertainment, and education television channel owned by China Central Television.

== Launch ==
The Russian-language channel was launched on 10 September 2009, on the occasion of the 60th anniversary of the establishment of diplomatic ties between Beijing and Moscow. CCTV Russian is broadcast through Chinasat 6B and EB-9A, which cover the Asian-Pacific Region, Middle East and Europe. The channel is aimed at about 300 million viewers in the post-Soviet nations (12 Commonwealth of Independent States members and three Baltic nations), and Eastern European countries. Since 2016, the channel is available on SPB TV's Belt and Road TV application.

== Programs ==
The channel broadcasts entirely in Russian, with 16 programs in the form of news, feature stories, entertainment and educational programs. Its daily schedule consists of 6-hour blocks. News broadcasts will be updated more often, while all feature programs air four times daily.

== Controversies ==
In 2020, in a report on the Two Sessions (plenary sessions of the National People's Congress and Chinese People's Political Consultative Conference), CGTN Russian used "Party of crooks and thieves", a derogative term to describe United Russia, in its video to introduce China's efforts to contain corruption, resulting in criticism from some Russian media.

== See also ==
- CCTV-4 (International Chinese)
- CGTN-Français (International French)
- CGTN-Español (International Spanish)
- CGTN-العربية (International Arabic)
- CGTN (International English)
- CNTV International
