= Singapore International Television =

- Country: Singapore

Programming
- Languages: English, Mandarin, Malay
- Picture format: 4:3 576i SDTV

Ownership
- Owner: Singapore International Foundation

History
- Launched: 1 January 1994; 32 years ago
- Closed: 2000; 26 years ago
- Replaced by: CNA (TV network) (de facto; International feed)

Singapore International Television (SITV) (Malay: Televisyen Antarabangsa Singapura) was a Singaporean satellite television channel operated by the Singapore International Foundation (SIF). Broadcasting an hour a day with the aim of catering to the Singaporean diaspora across Asia, the line-up was offered by SBC and its successor entities.

== History ==
In November 1993, the Singapore International Foundations announced plans to launch Singapore International Television on 1 January 1994. The service was expected to broadcast via the Indonesian Palapa B2P satellite and provide one hour of programming daily, from 22:00 to 23:00.

SITV’s launch was characterised as unambitious, supported by a limited staff of only 20 personnel. The South China Morning Post described it as “the smallest satellite TV launch in history,” while deputy director Aileen Lim referred to it as an “experiment.” The station rented broadcast capacity on a transponder owned by Australia’s Nine Network to carry its signal. Test transmissions began on 25 December 1993, a few days ahead of the planned launch. The opening night schedule comprised two programmes: a special edition of Inside Asia and a live simulcast of News 5 Tonight, both sourced from Channel 5.

The channel launched on the same day as RTB Sukmaindera, using a similar broadcasting arrangement on the same satellite. On the day of its debut, the Straits Times carried a full-page advertisement for SITV.

The channel began with a limited programme schedule, with the intention of expanding as additional airtime became available. Its core objective was aligned with the broader mission of the SIF: to help Singaporeans overseas maintain links with their home country and to present Singapore to international audiences. The service planned gradual growth in both daily hours and programme offerings. From its inception, SITV’s schedule was described as having a “strong ASEAN flavour.” The Straits Times characterised the initiative as “a small step” toward countering the one-way flow of Singaporean programming being exported abroad.

During the test transmission period, broadcasters in Indonesia, Taiwan and Thailand reportedly requested further information from the SIF. There was also discussion of appointing dedicated on-air presenters and selling commercial advertising.

SITV attracted criticism from members of Singapore’s Tamil community for its lack of Tamil-language programming, and some viewers also expressed interest in broadcasts in additional languages, including Russian and Japanese. The SIF stated that any expansion of the service would be accompanied by a broader linguistic offering, noting that the initial language profile reflected the footprint of the Palapa B2P satellite.

The service was made available at the Singapore embassy in Manila in May 1994.

On 25 August 1995, following a bilateral agreement between Singapore and Brunei, it was announced that SITV would transfer to a new lease on the Palapa C-1 satellite.

In 1997, the channel carried the Chingay parade for the first time, on a delayed basis. By that year, SITV’s broadcast output had reached 14 hours on weekdays and one hour on weekends.

SITV continued operating after the launch of Channel NewsAsia, and it carried the National Day Rally in both 1999 and 2000. Before closure, the channel had already converted its transmission to digital compression. It ceased operations in the early 2000s, with aspects of its role later taken up by Channel NewsAsia.

== Programming ==
SITV maintained one fixed daily programme, News 5 Tonight, broadcast at 22:30 local time. The remaining half-hour of the schedule was filled with material from other SBC/TCS channels in English, Mandarin, and Malay. The SIF selected the non-news content, omitting some programmes, such as Talking Point, in an effort to appeal to viewers outside Singapore. Inside Asia was included because it offered regional coverage “from the region on the region.” Overall, the programming lineup was intended to reflect Singapore’s linguistic and cultural diversity.

== See also ==
- TCS International
- Channel 8i
