= CCTV-Storm Music =

CCTV-Storm Music 风云音乐
- Country: People's Republic of China
- Broadcast area: China
- Headquarters: China Central Television Headquarters; East 3rd Ring Road; Chaoyang Metropolitan; Beijing, People's Republic of China

Programming
- Language(s): Chinese
- Picture format: 4:3 576i (SDTV); 16:9 1080i (HDTV)

Ownership
- Owner: China Central Television

History
- Launched: 9 August 2004

Links
- Website: Official Site

CCTV-Storm Music is a music pay television channel of the China Central Television and it is aired throughout the People's Republic of China.
