= TCS International =

- Country: Singapore
- Broadcast area: Selected countries in the Asia-Pacific region
- Headquarters: Caldecott Hill

Programming
- Language: Mandarin
- Picture format: 576i (4:3 SDTV)

Ownership
- Owner: Television Corporation of Singapore

History
- Launched: 1 October 1995; 31 years ago
- Closed: 2000; 26 years ago

TCS International, also known as Xin Shi (新视, derived from the shortform version of TCS's Chinese name 新加坡电视机构) was a satellite television network owned by the Television Corporation of Singapore. It was aimed at the Chinese-speaking world, delivering its programming exclusively in Mandarin Chinese.

== History ==
In June 1995, TCS announced the launch of an all-Chinese satellite television network, the first of its kind based in Singapore, seeking an audience in Hong Kong, China, the Philippines, Korea, Australia and other countries. The mix of programmes was set to include old and new TCS drama serials, TCS telemovies, variety shows, documentaries and current affairs programmes, including news. Simultaneously, a deal with Panamsat was signed to beam the channel via PAS-2.

In an initial phase, the channel would operate an 18-hour schedule, before increasing to a 24-hour schedule. Speaking to The Straits Times, Robert Chua, owner of the "no sex, no violence and no news" channel China Entertainment Television, said weeks ahead of TCSI's launch that TCS's output lacked his channel's cross-border appeal. At the time, the channel was announced to carry its signal on the PanAmSat-2 satellite, while CETV used Apstar-2.

On October 1, 1995, the channel started broadcasting as the second Singaporean satellite television channel, following Singapore International Television on 1 January 1994, a government-funded satellite television channel that carried programmes provided by TCS. TCSI was the beginning of an internationalisation plan, to be followed by an English-language counterpart in late 1996.

Despite claiming an audience of two million households in 1996, the channel closed in 2000 without warning by TCS's successor Mediacorp, who instead opted to use Channel NewsAsia as its key international service.

== See also ==
- Singapore International Television
- Channel 8i
