= China Network Television =

Chinese online television broadcaster

China Network Television 中国网络电视台
- Company type: Internet television
- Industry: Television Broadcasting
- Founded: 28 December 2009; 16 years ago
- Defunct: December 31, 2016
- Headquarters: Beijing, People's Republic of China
- Products: Television content, television programming
- Parent: China Central Television
- Website: cntv.cn

China Network Television (CNTV; Chinese: 中国网络电视台) was a Chinese national web-based TV broadcaster of China Central Television from 2009 to 2017.

CNTV International offered 6 local language services (Chinese, Mongolian in Mongol script, Tibetan, Kazakh, Uyghur and Korean) and 6 foreign language services (English, French, Spanish, Russian, Korean and Arabic). They also provided viewers with news and feature programs from China Central Television's foreign channels.

CNTV had multiple specialty channels which focus on a wide variety of subjects, including news, business and sports. As of December 2014 according to Alexa Internet, the network's website was ranked no. 71 in the world.

CNTV was rebranded as CCTV.com (Chinese: 央视网) on January 1, 2017.

== See also ==
- China Global Television Network
