= CGTN (TV channel) =

International Chinese news channel

- Type: State media
- Country: China
- Network: China Global Television Network
- Headquarters: CCTV Headquarters, Beijing Central Business District, Beijing, China

Programming
- Languages: Arabic, English, French, Spanish, Russian, Chinese (via SAP)
- Picture format: 1080i HDTV

Ownership
- Owner: China Media Group (Government of the People's Republic of China)
- Sister channels: CGTN Documentary, CGTN, CCTV-9, CCTV-13

History
- Launched: 20 September 1997; 29 years ago
- Former names: CCTV-9 (1997 - 2010); CCTV News (2010 - 2016)

Links
- Website: www.cgtn.com

Availability

Terrestrial
- Digital TV (DTMB) (China): Digital channel number varies by area.
- Digital TV Hong Kong: Channel 35 (HD)
- Digital TV (Macau): Channel 73
- Digital terrestrial television (United States): Channel 13.4 (Chicago); Channel 32.2 (Santa Barbara)
- Oqaab (Afghanistan): Channel 31
- UHF Colombo-FTA (Sri Lanka): Channel 29 (SD)
- DStv (Sub-Saharan Africa): Channel 409
- Zuku TV (Kenya): Channel 550
- AzamTV (Africa): Channel 238
- True Visions (Thailand): Channel 794

Streaming media
- CGTN Live: www.cgtn.com

CGTN is the English-language news channel of state-run China Global Television Network, based in Beijing, China. It is one of several channels provided by China Global Television Network, the international division of Chinese state broadcaster China Central Television (CCTV), under the control of the Central Propaganda Department of the Chinese Communist Party.

CCTV-9 was launched on 25 September 2000, rebranded as CCTV News on 26 April 2010. On 6 February 2012, CGTN America was launched in Washington, D.C. On 11 January 2012, CGTN Africa was launched in Nairobi, Kenya. All channels and divisions in the CCTV International group were rebranded as CGTN on 31 December 2016.

CGTN currently has four studios: Beijing (headquarters), Nairobi, Washington and London as well as 70 bureaus around the world.

== History ==
CCTV began considering English-language international news programming on 1 January 1979, at the start of the reform and opening up period. English news bulletins began on CCTV-2 in 1986 and became available to overseas viewers when they moved to CCTV-4 in February 1991. CCTV-9 began broadcasting across China on 25 September 2000, becoming the country's first all-English television station.

On 1 January 2003, CCTV-9 entered the United States cable market, as part of a deal that allowed AOL, Time Warner, and News Corporation access to cable systems in Guangdong. In its early years, CCTV-9 broadcast English language news bulletins and cultural interest shows for most of each day, and aired mostly reruns during the overnight hours in China. One of its biggest projects was covering the 2008 Beijing Olympics.

Until 26 April 2010, CCTV-9 was a mixed general interest channel featuring news, travel programming, and language training. On that date it was rebranded as CCTV News, a 24-hour English-language news service.

=== Relaunch ===
The channel name of CCTV-9 was changed to CCTV News on 26 April 2010. Some shows were rebranded while other new programs were added. The English website is managed by China Network Television (CNTV), a web streaming service of CCTV. On 1 January 2011, the channel's former name CCTV-9 was taken over by CCTV's two documentary channels.

=== CGTN ===
On 31 December 2016, the channel was rebranded again as CGTN.

==== Ofcom license revocation ====
On 4 February 2021, Ofcom withdrew CGTN's UK broadcaster license. Ofcom concluded a company called Star China Media Limited held the broadcast license for CGTN but "did not have editorial responsibility", and thus it did not meet legal requirements. The programming is claimed to be controlled by a company called China Global Television Network Corporation. The regulator said it was unable to transfer the license to that company because it is "ultimately controlled by the Chinese Communist Party, which is not permitted under UK broadcasting law". In most of Europe, distribution of the CGTN channel was permitted because it held a UK license, and unless CGTN obtained a license in another European country it had to go off air across most of Europe. The channel eventually obtained a new license through the French broadcast regulator CSA in March 2021. In response to the Ofcom revocation, China banned BBC World News from airing in mainland China, which was soon followed upon by RTHK withdrawing distribution of BBC's content in Hong Kong.

==== CGTN Africa ====
CGTN Africa is CGTN's African news productions center which was launched in Kenya on 11 January 2012. According to a 2022 study, only 6% of viewers in Kenya, 7% in South Africa and 11% in Nigeria said they watched CGTN Africa at least once a week.

==== CGTN America ====
CGTN America is the Americas division of CGTN that began broadcasting on 6 February 2012. It is based in Washington, DC and runs bureaus in North and South America. The service employs American and Chinese journalists and produces Americas-based programs for CGTN and CCTV.

The United States Department of Justice ordered CGTN America to register as a foreign agent under the Foreign Agent Registration Act (FARA), which CGTN America did on 1 February 2019. Registration requires CGTN America to disclose information about its annual budget and ownership structure, and to include disclaimers on broadcasts, published materials and social media identifying itself as a registered foreign agent. On 8 March 2019, after CGTN America registered under FARA, its director general Ma Jing and a dozen other staffers were recalled to Beijing.

==== CGTN Europe ====
CGTN Europe is CGTN's European division, mainly covering European business and politics. Its offices are at the Chiswick Business Park in west London. CGTN first moved into the office in January 2018 and planned to begin broadcasts by the end of the year, although issues which included "obtaining visas for top managers and setting up technology" eventually delayed its launch to October 2019.

Despite Ofcom's revocation of CGTN's broadcast license, a person briefed on the channel's strategy said it "would not impact the production centre, [CGTN] would just need to reorientate itself to produce more content for Europe."

== Foreign news anchors ==
Former comptroller Jiang Heping defended the policy of putting foreigners on air, arguing that "we feel international on-air personalities boost the credibility of CGTN and befit its image as an international channel. In this regard, CGTN will not restrict the origin of its employees and choose to build its unique identity through its programming."

Another prominent personality in CCTV-9's first decade was Mark Rowswell, otherwise known as Dashan. He hosted Travel in Chinese on CCTV News and has been honored for his work in promoting cancer awareness in China.

On 18 September 2019, Nick Pollard, a veteran British TV executive, resigned from his post as consultant and advisor to CGTN, giving his reason for leaving as being CGTN's failure to comply with Ofcom's rules on impartiality in connection to its coverage of the 2019–20 Hong Kong protests. He had joined CGTN in December 2018.

=== Detention of Cheng Lei ===
In mid-August 2020, Cheng Lei, an Australian journalist who since 2012 worked for CGTN as an anchor for a business show, was detained by Chinese authorities and charged in February 2021 with sharing state secrets, with no further information being provided. Soon after Cheng was detained, two Australian journalists working in China fled the country after being questioned by authorities on national security grounds, leaving Australia's media without any journalists working in China for the first time in nearly 50 years.

== Awards ==
The channel's Washington, DC–based broadcast center, CGTN America, has won a News & Documentary Emmy for Jen Bricker: When Can't is a Four-Letter Word, as well as multiple New York Festivals medals and White House News Photographers Association awards.

== Reception ==
=== Bias and censorship ===
Observers have noted that the "aim [of CGTN] is to influence public opinion overseas in order to nudge foreign governments into making policies favourable towards China's Communist party" through subtle means. Researchers Thomas Fearon and Usha M. Rodrigues argued that CGTN has a "dichotomous role as a credible media competing for audience attention on the world stage, and a vital government propaganda organ domestically."

According to James Palmer at Foreign Policy, the contrasting aims of RT (formerly Russia Today) and CGTN, "mirrors wider strategies: Moscow wants chaos it can exploit, while Beijing wants a stable world order—on its terms". While RT doesn't mind whether it goes to the far-left or the far-right, Chinese state media is permitted to "act from a very narrow, officially approved scope, and the risk of the political extremes is too much," according to journalist Hilton Yip. On the contrary to CGTN's investments in studios and numerous overseas bureaus, "the actual content is a mix of brutally tedious propaganda and bland documentaries. The audience is always the bosses in Beijing, not the average viewer overseas". Yip also noted the growing disillusionment of journalists in China who "are allowed to do little more than parrot the official line", citing a viral video of a journalist rolling her eyes at another reporter's softball question during a ministerial press conference, which "seemed to speak for many in the country who are tired of the charade that local media has become".

Despite a decade of overseas expansion, the redoubling of efforts by CGTN, and to an extension other state media, to push the party's theories and principles abroad is at odds with boosting China's overseas image. CGTN, along with other Chinese state media outlets, is still widely regarded as "editorially biased and full of propaganda, and they still struggle to attract large audiences", particularly in the age of widespread internet use with social media and nontraditional forms of media where the public has become "more averse to clumsy state-run propaganda than ever".

Despite its revamp launching of CCTV America, critics have voiced concerns over the level of censorship exercised by the channel, especially on sensitive domestic issues in China. Philip Cunningham of Cornell University, who has appeared more than 100 times on China Central Television talk shows, noted that sensitive issues such as Tibet and Xinjiang were heavily edited on various programs. Ma Jing, Director of CCTV America defends the channel against such allegations by saying that the channel edits stories the same way other news organizations do. She said: "We uphold the traditional journalistic values. We consider accuracy, objectivity, truthfulness, and public accountability very important, more important than anything else."

Research by the BBC found that viewer trust in CGTN globally averaged 70% in 2025, increased from 62% four years previously.

=== Fines ===
In March 2021, CGTN was fined £225,000 by Ofcom for bias in its coverage of the 2019–2020 Hong Kong protests, which was found to have repeatedly breached fairness and impartiality requirements.

=== Accessory to torture and forced confessions ===
On 23 November 2018, a British corporate investigator named Peter Humphrey submitted a formal complaint to the United Kingdom's government communications regulator The Office of Communications, or Ofcom, maintaining he was forced under duress to confess on air over Chinese state broadcaster China Central Television's (CCTV) network and that, as the confession was subsequently broadcast over the international arm of CCTV, China Global Television Network (CGTN), CGTN itself should be held culpable by Ofcom and denied the right to operate its broadcast service in the U.K. Humphrey's complaint cited two films produced by CCTV and additionally aired in the UK by CGTN, stating that both were scripted and directed by the Chinese police, the public security bureau, while he was a prisoner, in conditions of duress amounting to torture. One such confession, staged in August 2013, was filmed by a CCTV crew with Humphrey locked in an iron chair inside a steel cage, wearing handcuffs and an orange prison vest. This was before he had been indicted, tried or convicted of a crime. The second, in July 2014, was once again filmed by CCTV, not in a cage this time, but still in a prison vest and handcuffs, before he had been tried or convicted on the charge of illegal information gathering.

Ofcom said it would investigate the complaint and would "take necessary enforcement action" if rules are determined to have been violated. In November 2019, CGTN aired a video of a UK consular employee, Simon Cheng, in captivity "confessing" to consorting with prostitutes. Within a week, Cheng had filed a new complaint to Ofcom. On 8 March 2021, CGTN was fined a total of £225,000 by Ofcom for serious breaches of fairness, privacy and impartiality rules. "We found the individuals (Simon Cheng and Gui Minhai) concerned were unfairly treated and had their privacy unwarrantably infringed," Ofcom said, adding that the broadcaster had "failed to obtain their informed consent to be interviewed." It concluded that "material facts which cast serious doubt on the reliability of their alleged confessions" had been left out of its programing, which aired pretrial "confessions" of the two men while they were being detained. Ofcom said it was considering further sanctions.

On 4 February 2021, CGTN had its license to broadcast in the United Kingdom revoked by broadcasting regulator Ofcom after an investigation found that its license was held by Star China Media, which exercised no editorial oversight over CGTN. Ofcom subsequently imposed fines on CGTN. An open letter calling for Ofcom to reverse its revocation decision was signed by the editor of the left-wing Morning Star, Ben Chacko, along with journalists John Pilger, Jonathan Cook and Kerry-Anne Mendoza, film directors Oliver Stone and Ken Loach, rapper and activist Lowkey, and writer and activist Tariq Ali.

In March 2021, Australian public broadcaster Special Broadcasting Service suspended news bulletin broadcasts from CGTN and CCTV due to complaints of forced confessions.

=== Accusation of antisemitism ===
In May 2021, during the 2021 Israel–Palestine crisis, Israel's embassy in Beijing accused CGTN of "blatant antisemitism" when host Zheng Junfeng speculated on the origins of the Israel lobby in the United States and its connection to wealthy American Jews, which Israel characterized as an antisemitic canard.

== See also ==
- Propaganda in China
- Chinese information operations and information warfare
