= China Media Group =

State radio and television broadcaster in China

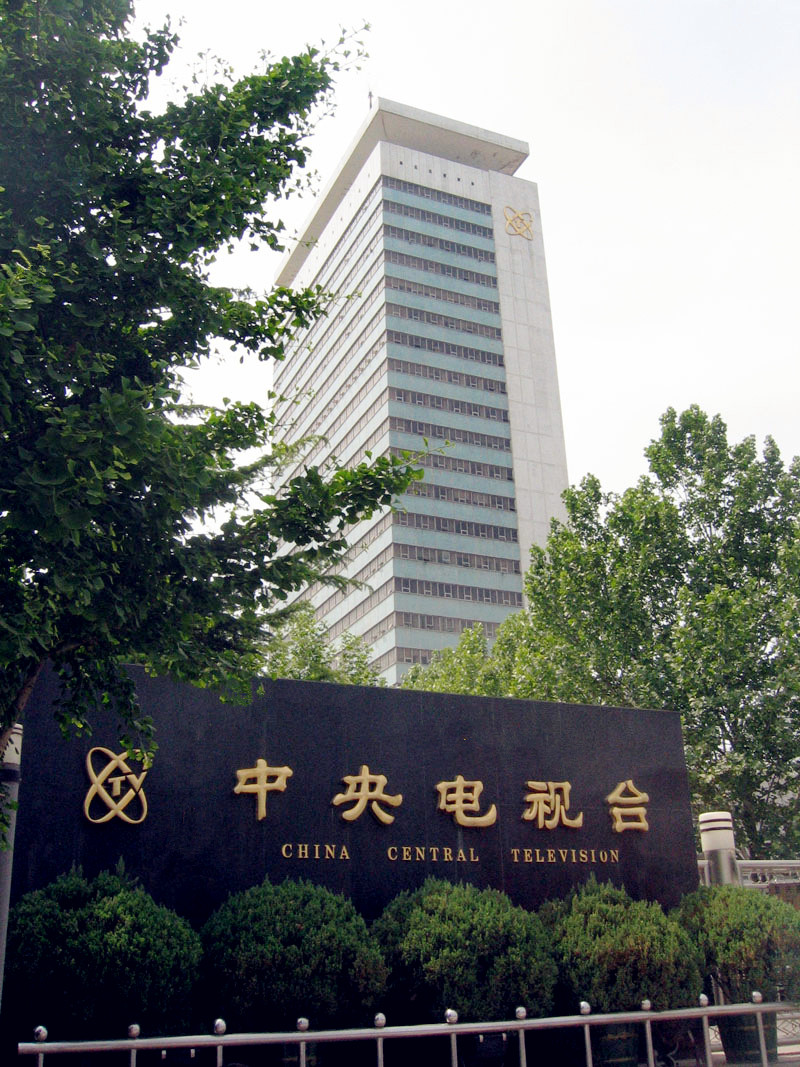
- China Central Television former headquarters, now China Media Group headquarters
- Type: State-owned enterprise
- Industry: State media
- Predecessors: China Central Television; China National Radio; China Radio International
- Founded: 21 March 2018; 8 years ago
- Headquarters: China Media Group Headquarters, Beijing, China
- Area served: Worldwide
- Key people: Shen Haixiong (President)
- Owner: Chinese Communist Party; Government of China
- Parent: Publicity Department of the Chinese Communist Party; State Council of the People's Republic of China
- Divisions: CCTV; CNR; CGTN; CRI

Chinese name
- Simplified Chinese: 中央广播电视总台
- Traditional Chinese: 中央廣播電視總台
- Literal meaning: Central Radio and Television General Station
Transcriptions
Standard Mandarin
- Hanyu Pinyin: Zhōngyāng Guǎngbō Diànshì Zǒngtaí

Alternative Chinese name
- Simplified Chinese: 中国之声
- Traditional Chinese: 中國之聲
- Literal meaning: Voice of China
Transcriptions
Standard Mandarin
- Hanyu Pinyin: Zhōngguó Zhīshēng
- Website: www.cctv.com/gyys

China Media Group, also known as Voice of China, is the predominant state media company for radio and television broadcasting in the People's Republic of China. It was founded on 21 March 2018, as a fusion of the state-holding media enterprises of China Central Television, (Note: includes China Global Television Network) China National Radio, China Radio International and China Global Television Network. China Media Group is under the direct control of the Central Propaganda Department of the Chinese Communist Party.

== History ==
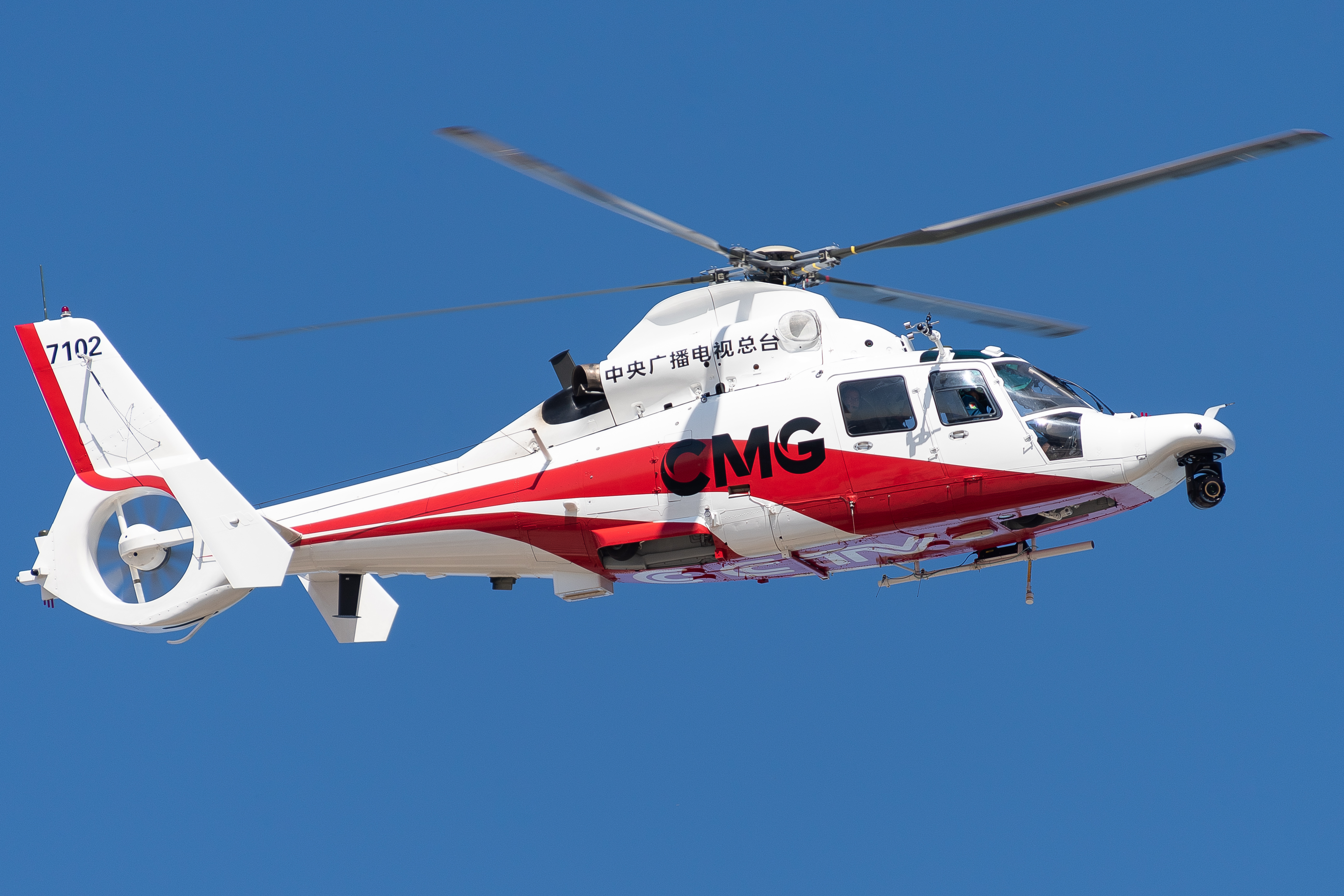
A Z-9WA news helicopter of CMG

On 21 March 2018, it was announced that China Central Television, China National Radio, and China Radio International were to be unified to become the China Media Group as part of the deepening the reform of the Party and state institutions. That same day, Shen Haixiong, was officially named President of China Media Group. The CMG was created to serve as a unified holding company of the People's Republic's national and international radio and television broadcasting services.

In 2020, several of CMG's assets, particularly China Global Television Network and China Radio International, were designated as foreign missions by the United States Department of State.

In 2023, the International Olympic Committee (IOC) reinforced its partnership with CMG for continued cooperation through the 2032 Summer Olympics.

== Editorial control ==
China Media Group is under the direct control of the Central Propaganda Department of the Chinese Communist Party.

== Broadcast scope ==
China Global Television Network and China Radio International broadcast in more than 40 languages.

== List of presidents ==
No.	Name	Took office	Left office	Notes
1	Shen Haixiong	21 March 2018	Incumbent	

== See also ==
- Mass media in China
- Propaganda in China
- National Radio and Television Administration
- People's Daily
- Xinhua News Agency
