= CGTN Documentary =

Chinese English-language pay television channel

- Type: State media
- Country: China
- Broadcast area: Worldwide

Programming
- Language: English
- Picture format: 1080i HDTV

Ownership
- Owner: China Global Television Network

History
- Launched: 1 January 2011; 15 years ago
- Former names: CCTV-9 Documentary (2011 - 2016)

Links
- Website: www.cgtn.com/channel/documentary

Availability

Terrestrial
- (Malaysia) Astro: Channel 556 (HD)
- (Malaysia) NJOI: Channel 556 (HD)
- DStv (Sub-Saharan Africa): Channel 448
- Zuku TV (Kenya): Channel 413
- (Hong Kong) Digital TV: Channel 34 (HD)
- (Macau) Digital TV: Channel 74

Streaming media
- CGTN Documentary: www.cgtn.com/channel/documentary

CGTN Documentary (formerly CCTV-9 Documentary) is a state-run English-language documentary channel operated by the China Global Television Network (CGTN) group, owned by Chinese state broadcaster China Central Television (CCTV). It broadcasts documentaries in the English language, and is China's first state-level English-language documentary channel to broadcast globally.

It used to share the "CCTV-9" name with its sister documentary channel in Mandarin Chinese. The channel has also been known to carry some Mandarin-language programmes with English subtitles; it broadcasts new programming between 7:00pm and 11:00pm Beijing time, and repeats archival programming at other times.

== Availability ==
In Macau, the digital terrestrial television operator TDM relays the channel on channel 74. In Hong Kong, the city's public broadcaster RTHK used to simulcast the channel as RTHK TV 33 terrestrially in both digital and analogue formats, but on 29 May 2017, RTHK began simulcasting a separate version of CCTV-1 in its place after a short filler. The CGTN Documentary simulcast were resumed from 1 July 2022, this time on digital-only channel 34.

In Pakistan, the channel is aired on different cable systems, including the PTCL (Pakistan Tele Communication Landline).

In Europe it can be received unencrypted by satellites Hotbird and Astra and in Italy on platform Tivùsat at LCN 88.
