= China Global Television Network =

Chinese state-owned broadcaster

- Type: State media
- Branding: CGTN
- Country: China
- Availability: Global
- Headquarters: CCTV Headquarters, Beijing
- Owner: Publicity Department of the Chinese Communist Party
- Parent: China Media Group
- Established: 2016; 10 years ago
- Launch date: 31 December 2016, 04:00 London Time/12:00 Beijing Time
- Affiliations: China Central Television; China Radio International
- Official website: www.cgtn.com

Chinese name
- Simplified Chinese: 中国国际电视台
- Traditional Chinese: 中國國際電視台
- Literal meaning: China International Television Station
Transcriptions
Standard Mandarin
- Hanyu Pinyin: Zhōngguó Guójì Diànshìtái
- Wade–Giles: Chung-kuo Kuo-chi Tien-shih-t'ai

Alternative Chinese name
- Simplified Chinese: 中国环球电视网
- Traditional Chinese: 中國環球電視網
- Literal meaning: China Global Television Network
Transcriptions
Standard Mandarin
- Hanyu Pinyin: Zhōngguó Huánqiú Diànshì Wǎng
- Wade–Giles: Chung-kuo Huan-ch'iu Tien-shih Wang

China Global Television Network (CGTN) is one of three branches of state-run China Media Group and the international division of China Central Television (CCTV). Headquartered in Beijing, CGTN broadcasts news in multiple languages. CGTN is under the control of the Publicity Department of the Chinese Communist Party.

Several media regulators and journalist advocacy groups have accused CGTN of broadcasting propaganda and disinformation on behalf of the Chinese government, and airing forced confessions.

== History ==
CGTN grew out of CCTV's all-English channel, known as CCTV-9 or CCTV International, launched in 2000 and renamed CCTV News in 2010. Channels in other languages were launched during the mid and late 2000s. On 1 January 2017, the six non-Chinese language television channels under CCTV International were rebranded to bear the CGTN name. In 2018, CGTN was brought under the umbrella of the China Media Group. By 2022, CGTN had built a network of social media influencers, according to the Associated Press.

Launching CGTN was intended to create a global outlet expressing Chinese government perspectives on global news, with the idea that it could compete in a niche similar to BBC or CNN. Observers have noted that the "aim [of CGTN] is to influence public opinion overseas in order to nudge foreign governments into making policies favourable towards China's Communist party" through subtle means. Australian researchers Thomas Fearon and Usha M. Rodrigues argued that CGTN has a "dichotomous role as a credible media competing for audience attention on the world stage, and a vital government propaganda organ domestically."

== Editions ==
=== TV channels ===
Name	Language	Launch date	Previous names
CGTN	English	20 September 1997	CCTV-9; CCTV-NEWS
CGTN Español	Spanish	1 October 2007	CCTV-E; CCTV-Español
CGTN Français	French	1 October 2007	CCTV-F; CCTV-Français
CGTN العربية	Arabic	25 July 2009	CCTV-العربية
CGTN Русский	Russian	10 September 2009	CCTV-Русский
CGTN Documentary	English	1 January 2011	CCTV-9 Documentary

=== Radio stations ===
Name	Language	Launch date	Replaced	Format	Source
CGTN Radio	English	1 August 2010 (as CRI Beyond Beijing); 14 December 2021 (as CGTN Radio)	CRI Beyond Beijing; CRI NEWS Plus; China Plus Radio; Easy FM	News and talk (with reruns of CGTN TV programming); Arabic, French, Russian and Spanish podcasts are available online	

=== Online platforms ===
Name	Language	Launch date	Replaced	Format	Source
CGTN Turk	Turkish	2023	CRI Turk	operates a website and various social media platforms (Facebook, Instagram, X)	
CGTN Malay	Malay	2023	CRI Malay	operates on Facebook only	
CGTN Hausa	Hausa	2023	CRI Hausa	operates on Facebook only	
CGTN Tajikistan	Tajik	2023	None	operates on Facebook and X only, videos translated from CGTN Russian	
CGTN Uzbekistan	Uzbek	2023	None	operates on Facebook and X only, videos translated from CGTN Russian	
CGTN Қазақша	Kazakh	2023	None	operates on Facebook and X only, videos translated from CGTN Russian	
CGTN Кыргызча	Kyrgyz	2023	None	operates on Facebook and X only, videos translated from CGTN Russian	

== Analysis and reception ==
According to James Palmer at Foreign Policy, the contrasting aims of RT (formerly Russia Today) and CGTN, "mirrors wider strategies: Moscow wants chaos it can exploit, while Beijing wants a stable world order—on its terms". While "RT doesn't mind whether it goes to the far-left or the far-right," Chinese state media is permitted to "act from a very narrow, officially approved scope, and the risk of the political extremes is too much," according to journalist Hilton Yip. On the contrary to CGTN's investments in studios and numerous overseas bureaus, "the actual content is a mix of brutally tedious propaganda and bland documentaries. The audience is always the bosses in Beijing, not the average viewer overseas". Yip also noted the growing disillusionment of journalists in China who "are allowed to do little more than parrot the official line", citing a viral video of a journalist rolling her eyes at another reporter's softball question during a ministerial press conference, which "seemed to speak for many in the country who are tired of the charade that local media has become".

Despite a decade of overseas expansion, the redoubling of efforts by CGTN, and to an extension other state media, to push the party's theories and principles abroad is at odds with boosting China's overseas image. CGTN, along with other Chinese state media outlets, is still widely regarded as "editorially biased and full of propaganda, and they still struggle to attract large audiences", particularly in the age of widespread internet use with social media and nontraditional forms of media where the public has become "more averse to clumsy state-run propaganda than ever".

In his 2022 book Beijing's Global Media Offensive: China's Uneven Campaign to Influence Asia and the World, journalist Joshua Kurlantzick wrote that CGTN "tried to build itself a presence that could rival other global broadcasters like Al Jazeera, RT, the Turkish global broadcaster TRT World, and, the Chinese government hopes, giants like CNN and the BBC." In December 2022, he said that the government "wanted CGTN to be regarded as a credible source of information, like Al Jazeera", but described the idea as "something of a fantasy". He added: "Qatar is a small state, and it has significant foreign policy on a few certain issues. But outside of those issues, Qatar has basically left its Al Jazeera reporters alone. China was never going to be able to do that because virtually any issue could have an impact on China."

In a 2022 research paper comparing RT and CGTN's coverage of the 2020 United States presidential election, Martin Moore and Thomas Colley of King's College London described CGTN as using a "surface neutrality" propaganda model, noting that it "avoid[ed] expressing partisanship or framing US politics in an unduly biased or subjective way" in its coverage of the election, but it "dropp[ed] its objective tone in favour of being enthusiastically pro-China, without exception" in its coverage of geopolitical issues affecting China, and that CGTN did not publish content that was critical of or embarrassing to the Chinese government. They added: "Unlike RT, it frequently frames issues (such as the revelations about Trump's taxes) through the prism of the Chinese interest—even if the issues have no direct bearing on China. These characteristics contravene journalistic norms of independence from government and impartiality". Moore and Colley noted in another paper that during the election, "[CGTN] presented the US as poorly governed, plutocratic, racist and a destabilising international influence, and China as well governed, benign, stable, and as a rising superpower."

=== Bias, censorship, and disinformation ===
Critics have accused CGTN of broadcasting misinformation and making false allegations against opponents of the Chinese government. The network has been investigated and censured by Britain's Ofcom for biased coverage of the 2019–2020 Hong Kong protests and the airing of forced confessions. CGTN has been characterized as a vehicle for government propaganda and disinformation campaigns by Reporters Without Borders, BBC, and other sources.

Despite its revamp launching of CCTV America, critics have voiced concerns over the level of censorship exercised by the channel, especially on sensitive domestic issues in China. Philip Cunningham of Cornell University, who has appeared more than 100 times on CCTV talk shows, noted that sensitive issues such as Tibet and Xinjiang were heavily edited on various programs. Ma Jing, Director of CCTV America, defended the channel against such allegations by saying that the channel edits stories the same way other news organizations do. She said: "We uphold the traditional journalistic values. We consider accuracy, objectivity, truthfulness, and public accountability very important, more important than anything else."

In December 2018, the U.S. Department of Justice determined that CGTN must register under the Foreign Agents Registration Act (FARA) as an agent for the Chinese government and the Chinese Communist Party. In the subsequent FARA filing with the U.S. Department of Justice dated 2 February 2019, Ms. Ma Jing wrote that CGTN maintained editorial independence free from the state's influence and functioned similarly to other news media. A month later, in early March 2019, she was summoned to return to China.

On 18 September 2019, Nick Pollard, a British TV executive, resigned from his post as consultant and advisor to CGTN, giving his reason for leaving as being CGTN's failure to comply with Ofcom's rules on impartiality in connection to its coverage of the Hong Kong anti-extradition bill protests. He had joined CGTN in December 2018. Ofcom had several inquiries into CGTN going on in September 2019. In March 2021, CGTN was fined £225,000 by Ofcom for bias in its coverage of the 2019 pro-democracy protests in Hong Kong, which was found to have repeatedly breached fairness and impartiality requirements.

In a September 2019 article in The Diplomat, Sarah Cook of the Freedom House said that CGTN "has a consistent record of blatantly and egregiously violating journalistic standards and encouraging or justifying hatred and violence against innocent people."

In July 2021, BBC News reported that CGTN initiated a drive to use foreign vloggers, such as Raz Gal-Or and Lee and Oli Barrett, as stringers to denounce negative coverage of Xinjiang. The use of these individuals prevents YouTube from labelling their content as state-sponsored content, although their videos are promoted by state media accounts. Australian cybersecurity researcher Robert Potter from Internet 2.0 said there was evidence that these vloggers were heavily promoted using a mix of 50 Cent Army, click farms, fake bot accounts, and fake news websites, all to "spoof YouTube into treating it like a legitimate view." Global Voices reported in October 2021 that CGTN had also hired Arabic-speaking social media influencers to frame Chinese government policies toward the Uyghurs as part of an anti-terrorist measure.

In February 2021, a Press Gazette investigation found that CGTN purchased ads on Facebook that denied any mistreatment of Uyghurs and promoted Xinjiang re-education camps as "vocational training centres."

=== Broadcasting of forced confessions ===
CCTV broadcast two forced confessions of the British journalist Peter Humphrey. The first was staged in August 2013, and was filmed by a CCTV crew with Humphrey locked in an iron chair inside a steel cage, wearing handcuffs and an orange prison vest. This was before he had been indicted, tried or convicted of a crime. The second, in July 2014, was once again filmed by CCTV, not in a cage this time, but still in a prison vest and handcuffs, before he had been tried or convicted on the charge of illegal information gathering. Both were aired in the UK by CGTN.

On 23 November 2018, Humphrey filed a complaint to Ofcom against CCTV, citing violations of the United Kingdom Broadcasting Code's Fairness and Privacy provisions. Humphrey said that both confessions were scripted and directed by the Chinese police, the public security bureau, while he was a prisoner, in conditions of duress amounting to torture. On 6 July 2020, Ofcom ruled that CGTN was guilty of breaching UK broadcasting standards in both incidents. The ruling stated that CGTN had breached Humphrey's privacy and that in the channel's reporting, "material facts were presented, disregarded or omitted in a way that was unfair to Mr Humphrey".

In November 2019, CGTN aired a video of a UK consular employee, Simon Cheng, in captivity "confessing" to consorting with prostitutes. Within a week, Cheng had filed a complaint with Ofcom.

On 8 March 2021, CGTN was fined a total of £225,000 by Ofcom for serious breaches of fairness, privacy and impartiality rules. "We found the individuals (Simon Cheng and Gui Minhai) concerned were unfairly treated and had their privacy unwarrantably infringed," Ofcom said, adding that the broadcaster had "failed to obtain their informed consent to be interviewed." It concluded that "material facts which cast serious doubt on the reliability of their alleged confessions" had been left out of the programmes, which aired pre-trial "confessions" of the two men while they were being detained. Ofcom said it was considering further sanctions.

=== Detained Australian journalist ===
In August 2020, Australian CGTN television anchor Cheng Lei was detained by Chinese authorities on national security grounds but no details of accusations were provided. China's Ministry of State Security said that Cheng provided state secrets she gathered from her work to a foreign organization through her mobile phone. In October 2023, the Australian government announced that Cheng had been released and returned to Australia.

=== COVID-19 misinformation ===
In April 2020, the non-governmental organization Reporters Without Borders criticized CGTN for engaging in disinformation regarding COVID-19. The United States Department of State described CGTN's output on COVID-19 as part of a wider government-led disinformation campaign. In April 2021, the European External Action Service published a report that cited Chinese state media outlets, including CGTN, as spreading disinformation to present Western vaccines as unsafe.

=== French journalist controversy ===
In March 2021, an investigation by Le Monde stated that a French journalist for CGTN identified as "Laurène Beaumond" was a fabricated identity. Le Figaro disputed this, saying "Beaumond" was a real French journalist from Sarthe, but had been publishing for CGTN under a pseudonym. Le Figaro said they had interviewed "Beaumond", under the condition that her true identity be kept secret.

=== Israel coverage ===
In May 2021, Israel's embassy in Beijing accused CGTN of "blatant antisemitism" when it said that "powerful lobbies" of Jews and the "influence of wealthy Jews" in the United States were responsible for America's pro-Israel position during the 2021 Israel–Palestine crisis.

A week after the 2023 Hamas-led attack on Israel, CGTN journalist Stephanie Freid visited Sderot and reported that during a shootout at the local police station, "Hamas fighters and their police captives were apparently killed when Israeli forces opened fire on the station with a tank." CGTN's report was cited by pro-Palestine outlets such as Indonesian news sites Republika and Tribunnews.com.

=== Peng Shuai disappearance ===
In December 2021, Chinese professional tennis player Peng Shuai disappeared after publicizing sexual assault allegations against former Chinese vice premier Zhang Gaoli. CGTN's official account on Twitter subsequently posted an "email" professed to be from her claiming she was okay, but attracted questions over its authenticity as a cursor was visible in the screenshot of the third line. The Women's Tennis Association did not believe the email was genuine.

=== Russian invasion of Ukraine ===
In March 2022, CGTN paid for digital ads on Facebook targeting global users with briefings and newscasts featuring pro-Kremlin talking points about the Russian invasion of Ukraine after Meta Platforms banned Russian state media advertisement buys. CGTN has promoted unsubstantiated Russian claims of biological weapons labs in Ukraine.

=== Fukushima Daiichi Nuclear Power Plant ===
In 2023, CGTN ran paid ads on social media platforms in multiple countries and languages denouncing the discharge of radioactive water of the Fukushima Daiichi Nuclear Power Plant, which critics labeled part of a concerted disinformation campaign.

=== Drama shows ===
CGTN's dramatic television series are popular among foreign viewers, particularly viewers in the Middle East. Among the more popular series with foreign viewers are Shanghai Qing (Minning Town) and Xiao Huanxi (A Little Reunion).

=== Information laundering ===
According to a 2025 report by Graphika, artificial intelligence is used to launder articles from CGTN through various social media sites in an attempt to disguise the articles' origin. According Graphika and the EU's East StratCom Task Force, CGTN affiliates have registered multiple seemingly-authentic websites, such as videostory.com, that used generative AI to translate CGTN content into local languages without any indication of their origin. The East StratCom Task Force described this tactic as information laundering.

== Responses ==
=== U.S. designation as foreign mission ===
In 2018, the United States Department of Justice directed CGTN America, the U.S. division of CGTN, to register as a foreign agent under the Foreign Agents Registration Act (FARA). CGTN America said in its FARA filings on 1 February 2019 that it disagreed with the Justice Department's decision, but registered nonetheless. In 2020, the United States Department of State designated CGTN and its parent company, CCTV, as foreign missions.

=== Revocation of UK broadcasting license ===
On 4 February 2021, Star China Media (the UK broadcast license holder for CGTN) had its broadcast license revoked by UK broadcasting regulator Ofcom. Ofcom found that Star had no editorial oversight over the channel it was broadcasting, and was instead acting as a third-party distributor for CGTN's feed. Ofcom also denied an application to transfer the broadcast license to the China Global Television Network Corporation (CGTNC), on the grounds that CGTNC was "controlled by a body which is ultimately controlled by the Chinese Communist Party". UK law prohibits license holders from being controlled by political bodies. In a statement, Ofcom said:

We have given CGTN significant time to come into compliance with the statutory rules. Those efforts have now been exhausted. Following careful consideration, taking account of all the facts and the broadcaster's and audience's rights to freedom of expression, we have decided it is appropriate to revoke the licence for CGTN to broadcast in the UK. We expect to conclude separate sanctions proceedings against CGTN for due impartiality and fairness and privacy breaches shortly.

In what CNN Business characterised as "an apparent tit-for-tat move", the Chinese government banned the BBC World News TV channel from airing in China on 11 February. Given that BBC World News could only be received in so-called foreign compounds (such as internationally owned hotels) in mainland China in the first place, it was unclear what impact, if any, this ban would have. Following the license revocation, CGTN no longer had permission to broadcast in Germany, due to its German license being approved by Ofcom, but it resumed broadcasting via Vodafone Germany in March 2021.

CGTN later sought and received agreement from French regulatory authorities to broadcast in France, which would allow them to broadcast in member states of the Council of Europe, including the United Kingdom.

In August 2021, Ofcom levied additional fines on CGTN's UK license holder, Star China Media, for breaches of rules around fairness and privacy. The channel announced later in the month that the channel has returned to the UK by launching on Freeview. Ofcom later claimed the channel uses the Vision TV Network, an internet-based datacasting service.

=== Suspension from SBS ===
In March 2021, the Australian television network SBS suspended the English and Mandarin broadcasts of CGTN and CCTV respectively, which were broadcast on SBS as part of its World Watch program, over human rights complaints concerning the airings of "forced confessions." CGTN responded in a statement that CCTV had signed a cooperation agreement with SBS to broadcast some of CCTV's Chinese programs for free in 2006, but CGTN did not authorize SBS to broadcast its English programs.
