= CCTV-9 =

Chinese English-language pay television channel

- Country: China
- Broadcast area: China, Malaysia, France, Vietnam, Russia, Taiwan, Macau

Programming
- Picture format: 1080i HDTV

Ownership
- Owner: China Central Television
- Sister channels: CCTV-1

History
- Launched: 1 January 2011
- Former names: CCTV-News

Links
- Website: cctv.cntv.cn/cctv9/

Availability

Terrestrial
- Digital TV (DTMB): Digital channel number varies by region

Streaming media
- CCTV program website: CCTV-9 (restricted access outside China)

CCTV-9 is a television channel operated by Chinese state broadcaster China Central Television (CCTV), broadcasting documentaries in Mandarin Chinese. It shared the name with CCTV's English language documentary channel until 31 December 2016, when the latter was renamed CGTN Documentary.
