= CGTN French =

French language entertainment and news channel of China Central Television

CGTN Français
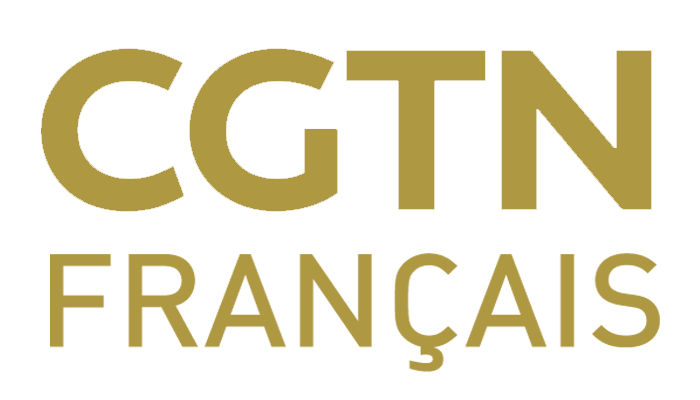
- Type: State media
- Country: China
- Broadcast area: Worldwide

Programming
- Language(s): French
- Picture format: HDTV 1080i

History
- Launched: 1 October 2007; 18 years ago
- Replaced: CCTV-F, CCTV-Français

Links
- Website: francais.cgtn.com

Availability

Terrestrial
- DStv (Sub-Saharan Africa): Channel 449
- Zuku TV (Kenya): Channel 831

Streaming media
- CNTV Ai Bugu: francais.cgtn.com

CGTN French (formerly CCTV International French or CCTV-Français formerly CCTV-F is a French language entertainment and news channel of China Central Television (CCTV) originating in China, and are part of the Chinese Government's information ministry.

The channels cater to an international audience, with programmes containing French subtitles. There are also news programmes featuring French-language reporters. These programmes provide both Chinese and international news coverage.

Most programmes on CCTV-F are 30 minutes long. They feature a variety of content, including news programmes, educational programmes, and Chinese soap operas.

There are also programmes offering tourism advice and showcasing new Chinese artists.

CCTV-F launched on October 1, 2007, as the result of the splitting of CCTV E&F, a bilingual channel in both Spanish and French, three years after its launch on October 1, 2004.

Starting in 2022, Standard Chinese audio dubbed and French subtitles shows were broadcast.
