= CCTV-4 =

International Chinese TV channel

- Country: China
- Broadcast area: China; Worldwide; including North America and Chile (in limited access)
- Network: CCTV
- Headquarters: Beijing, China

Programming
- Languages: Mandarin; Cantonese (selected titles); Hokkien (selected titles); English (selected titles)
- Picture format: 1080i HDTV

Ownership
- Owner: CCTV

History
- Launched: 1 October 1992; 34 years ago
- Former names: China Central Television Fourth Program (1 October 1992–31 October 1994); China Central Television International Channel (1 November 1994–29 January 2006)

Links
- Website: CCTV-4 Asia/China; CCTV-4 Europe; CCTV-4 America

Availability

Terrestrial
- Digital TV (DTMB): Digital channel numbers varies by area.
- Digital terrestrial television (United States): Channel 31.8 (Los Angeles, CA); Channel 32.2 (New York, NY)
- Freeview (UK): Channel 226 (Streamed)
- DStv (Sub-Saharan Africa): Channel 447
- Zuku TV (Kenya): Channel 830

Streaming media
- CCTV program website: CCTV-4 Asia; CCTV-4 Europe; CCTV-4 America
- Sling TV: Internet Protocol television

CCTV-4 is a Chinese free-to-air television channel. It is one of six China Central Television channels that broadcasts outside of China. It airs a variety of programmes, including documentaries, music, news, drama series, sports and children's programmes for the Greater China region, including China, Hong Kong, Macau and (in some occasions) Taiwan.

== History ==
Before the launch of CCTV-4, CCTV's programming was sent abroad to areas with a sizeable Chinese diaspora. In January 1992, CCTV delivered programmes to the Americas using Ku- and C-band satellites, in English, for an hour a day.

CCTV-4 was officially launched on 1 October 1992 with broadcasts from 8:30 am to 12:10 am Beijing Time. In 1997, the channel was made available to the Americas. The following year, its content was made available in Japan on a joint service called CCTV-Daifu (now Daifu Channel).

The programming of CCTV-4 initially consisted of a mixture of English- and Chinese-language programming. English broadcasts stopped with the launch of CCTV-9 in September 2000. Select CCTV-4 programmes were also broadcast in Cantonese until 2007.

On 1 November 1994, CCTV News was replaced by "China News".

On 1 July 1995, the channel expanded and extended its international coverage by launching on satellite. At the same time, the channel was revised and programmes were broadcast in Mandarin, Cantonese and English, and started airing 24 hours a day.

A deal was inked with the International Shopping Network to air a ten-minute home shopping program in August 1996, the deal was expected to last three years.

On 1 January 2007, the channel was split into three feeds:

- CCTV-4 Asia
- CCTV-4 Europe
- CCTV-4 America

== Criticism ==
In 2016, Peter Dahlin's forced confessions were aired on CCTV-4. In 2019, he filed a complaint against China Central Television-4 (CCTV-4 World) with Canadian authorities, having previously accused the Canadian regulator CRTC of inaction.

== Programmes ==
- CCTV New Year's Gala
- China's Public Opinion Field
- Across China
- Traditional Chinese Medicine
- Our Chinese Heart
- China Showbiz
- China News
- Xinwen Lianbo
- Journey to Civilization
- Foreigner in China
- Tian Ya Gong Ci Shi
- Sports on Line
- Happy Chinese
- Asia Today
- Focus Today
- Chinese World
- Beloved Family
