= List of Taiwanese television series =

Here is a partial list of Taiwanese television shows:

== News ==
- CTS News (華視新聞) - CTS
- CTV News (中視新聞) - CTV
- FTV News (民視新聞) - FTV
- PTS News (公視新聞) - PTS
- TTV News (台視新聞) - TTV

== Studio shows ==
=== Comedy shows ===
- Chung T'ien Television (CTi) - CTi Entertainment

- Celebrity Imitated Shows (全民最大黨) (2011-2013) - formerly Everybody Speaks Nonsenses II – Hot Pot (全民大悶鍋) (2004–2007)

=== Talk shows ===
- Chung T'ien Television (CTi) - CTi Variety

- Mr Con. and Mrs. Csi (康熙來了) (2004–2016)
- SS Xiaoyan Night (SS小燕之夜)

=== Entertainment/variety shows ===
- Taiwan Television (TTV) - TTV Main Channel

- All Pass (百萬小學堂) (2008-present)
- Diamond Club (鑽石夜總會) (2008-present)
- Million Singer (百萬大歌星) (2008-present)

- China Television (CTV) - CTV Main Channel

- (綜藝大本營) (2011–present)
- Guess (你猜你猜你猜猜猜) (2011–2012) - formerly 我猜我猜我猜猜猜 (1996–2010)

- Chung T'ien Television (CTi) - CTi Variety

- Did you go to University yet? (大學生了沒) (2007–present)

- Gala Television (GTV) - GTV Variety Show

- 100% Entertainment (娛樂百分百) (1997–present)

- Sanlih E-Television (SETTV) - SET Metro/SET Variety

- Showbiz (完全娛樂)

- Channel V Taiwan

- Wo Ai Hei Se Hui (我愛黑澀會) (2005-2009)
- Mo Fan Bang Bang Tang (模范棒棒堂) (2006-2009)

=== Competition shows ===
- Taiwan Television (TTV) - TTV Main Channel

- Super Idol (Taiwanese TV series) (超級偶像) (2007–2014)

- China Television (CTV) - CTV Main Channel

- One Million Star (超級星光大道) (2007–????)

- One Million Star (season 1) (超級星光大道 (第一屆)) (2007)
- One Million Star (season 2) (超級星光大道 (第二屆)) (2007)
- One Million Star (season 3) (超級星光大道 (第三屆)) (2008)
- One Million Star (season 4) (超級星光大道 (第四屆)) (2008)
- One Million Star (season 5) (超級星光大道 (第五屆)) (2009)
- One Million Star (season 6) (超級星光大道 (第六屆)) (2009)
- One Million Star Star Legend Contest (超級星光大道：星光傳奇賽) (2010)
- One Million Star (season 7) (超級星光大道 (第七屆)) (2010)

- Chinese Million Star (華人星光大道) (2011–????)

== Dramas ==
=== Historical dramas ===
- 1984 - Book and Sword Chronicles (書劍江山) - Taiwan Television (TTV) (台視)
- 1985 - Chor Lau-heung (1985 TV series) (楚留香新傳) - China Television (CTV) (中視)
- 1992 - The Book and the Sword (1992 TV series) (書劍恩仇錄) - Chinese Television System (CTS)
- 1993 - New Legend of Madame White Snake (新白娘子傳奇)
- 1995 - Chor Lau-heung (1995 TV series) (香帥傳奇) - Taiwan Television (TTV)
- 2002 - Book and Sword, Gratitude and Revenge (書劍恩仇錄) - China Television (CTV)

=== Reality dramas ===
- 1983 - Star Knows My Heart (星星知我心)
- 1984 - Last Night Stars (昨夜星辰)
- 1998 - Old House Has Joy (老房有喜)
- 1999 - April Rhapsody (人間四月天)
- 1999 - Once Upon a Time (曾經) - 2000 Best Miniseries or Television Film for 25th Golden Bell Awards
- 2001 - The Pawnshop No. 8 (第8號當舖)
- 2004 to 2006 - The Unforgettable Memory (意難忘) - Formosa Television (FTV)
- 2007 - New Last Night Stars (新昨夜星辰)

== Reality shows ==
- Circus Action

== Animation ==
- 2021 - Brave Animated Series (勇者動畫系列)
- 2021 - Omi Sky (歐米天空)
- 2021 - Pigsy Express (未來宅急便)
- 2022 - Monster Fruit Academy (妖果小學)

== See also ==
- Taiwanese drama
- List of Taiwanese dramas
- Taiwan Public Television Service Foundation (PTS)
- Television in Taiwan
- List of Chinese-language television channels
- List of television programs
- Censorship in Taiwan
- Press Freedom Index
- Media of Taiwan
