= Ma Chien-hui =

Taiwanese news anchor

Ma Chien-hui (born January 21, 1974) is a Taiwanese news anchor. She graduated from the Department of Journalism and Communication at Fu Jen Catholic University. She previously worked as a reporter and anchor for ETtoday News, and currently serves as the host and producer of Big News, Big Revelations on CTi News channel.

== Background ==
Ma Chien-hui graduated from the Department of Journalism and Communication at Fu Jen Catholic University. Her family traces its origins to the Manchu Bordered Yellow Banner Ma Jia clan. In 2010, she ended a seven-year marriage and is currently single.

== Career ==
- Reporter, anchor, and host at ETtoday News Channel
- Host of Taking the Pulse of Taiwan on ETtoday News Channel
- Reporter and anchor at CTi News
- Host of Crazy Talk Show on CTi Entertainment Channel (September 14 – December 28, 2014)
- Host of College Students Are So Chill on CTi Entertainment Channel (September 29 – December 5, 2014)
- Host of Seeking Truth in Asian Current Affairs on CTi Asia
- Producer of Opening New China on CTi News
- Spokesperson for the 2010 Taipei International Flora Expo
- Director of the Media Center, Taipei City Government Flora Expo Headquarters
- Co-host (with Huang Chih-hsien) of Night Questions, Day Power on CTi News (October 3, 2016 – March 10, 2017)
- Host of Cross-Strait Must-Win Key 2018 on CTV Main Channel (January 1 – November 24, 2018)
- Host of Decisive Battle of the Nine-in-One Elections: Vote Counting Live on CTV on CTV Main Channel and CTV News Channel (November 24, 2018)
- Substitute host and host of News Deep Throat on CTi News Channel
- Host of News Tornado on CTi News Channel (co-hosted with Tai Li-kang)
- Host of Big News, Big Revelations on CTi News Channel
- Host and producer of News Thousand-Mile Horse on CTi News Channel (January 2, 2021 – present)
- Host of Nine-in-One Elections: Countdown Special Vote Report on CTi News Channel (November 26, 2022)
- Host of 2024 Election: Special Coverage on CTi on CTi News Channel (January 13, 2024)
- Host of Kuomintang Chairperson Election Vote Count Special Report on CTi News Channel (October 18, 2025)

== Current positions ==
- Anchor at CTi News Channel
- Host of Big News, Big Revelations on CTi News Channel
- Host and producer of News Thousand-Mile Horse on CTi News Channel (January 2, 2021 – present)
