= Tai Li-kang =

Taiwanese television presenter

Tai Li-kang (Chinese: 戴立綱; pinyin: Dài Lìgāng; born November 16, 1969), also known by the English name James Tai, is a Taiwanese meteorological anchor, news anchor, and television host. He graduated from the Department of Environmental Engineering at Vanung Industrial Junior College, the Department of Atmospheric Sciences at Chinese Culture University, earned a master's degree from the Graduate Institute of Political Science at Chinese Culture University, and pursued doctoral studies at the Graduate Institute of Earth Sciences at Chinese Culture University. He currently serves as a weather anchor for CTV News and CTi News.

== Biography ==
From a young age, Tai Li-kang developed a strong interest in meteorology. In his youth, he would ride a bicycle to survey disaster areas after typhoons, including the Huoshao Garbage Mountain fire, Typhoon Nari, and Typhoon Morakot, and even ventured deep into the disaster zones of the 1999 Jiji earthquake. After severe weather events, Tai would often tell his parents that he was “going out for a walk,” but in reality, he would rush immediately to locations most likely to be flooded or hardest hit by wind and rain. In 1996, he observed the actual impacts brought by Typhoon Herb.

On May 1, 2006, following the departure of China Television Company (CTV) weather anchor Jen Li-yu to Chinese Television System (CTS), Tai Li-kang became the weather anchor of CTV Weather Center. Beginning in June 2012, he started hosting talk shows and also took on the role of news anchor. Regarding his long-term involvement in programs discussing topics “that science cannot explain,” Tai jokingly remarked that, given his academic background, he should be the “most scientific” person in the newsroom; however, he has consistently maintained that “when science cannot explain something, the gap in between is precisely that mysterious realm”.

=== Certifications ===
Department of Atmospheric Sciences, Chinese Culture University: Class A Forecaster, Huagang Weather Forecasting and Multimedia Production Center

Central Weather Administration: License to engage in meteorological forecasting operations

== Reception ==
Recognizing Tai Li-kang's popularity as a program host, CTi Television launched a set of customized “Li-kang Watches the Weather” LINE stickers in August 2015. Known for his insistence on precision in his professional field, Dai demands accuracy in meteorological graphics created by animators. If errors occur, he is known to reprimand the animators. As a result, “they ended up drawing my angry expressions extremely vividly”.

Tai Li-kang is known for having two distinct on-screen images. When delivering weather reports, he wears rimless glasses. When hosting programs such as News Tornado, he switches to black-framed glasses, removes his jacket, and once demonstrated a rapid outfit change on the variety show Kangsi Coming .

== Controversies ==
In August 2012, Tai Li-kang was suspected of violating the Meteorological Act by independently broadcasting the projected path of Typhoon Tembin without authorization, and was subsequently warned by the Central Weather Bureau. The following year, Tai and the News Tornado program that he hosted was criticized for inviting guests to comment extensively on an urban legend, and for using a prop toilet when discussing a double murder and corruption allegations against Lin Yi-shih.

In April 2014, Tai and political commentator Peng Hua-gan used obscene and vulgar language to objectify women participating in the Sunflower Student Movement, and mocked the movement as relying on physical attractiveness to draw crowds. After clips of the program were released, tens of thousands of netizens initiated a boycott of the show and called on viewers to file complaints with the National Communications Commission (NCC) and women’s advocacy groups, urging commentary programs to observe proper boundaries. Subsequently, the NCC imposed a fine of NT$500,000, and Tai Li-kang received a major disciplinary demerit as a result. Tai and his program received additional criticism in 2015, when an interview during the Kaohsiung Prison riot with a prison warden was aired while the warden was being held hostage. In November 2020, Tai's network, Chung T'ien Television, was taken off the air for a News Tornado episode that had been broadcast in June 2019. Tai's guest Hsieh Lung-chieh alleged that the presidential administration of Tsai Ing-wen was spying on her opponent, the Kuomintang candidate Han Kuo-yu. Tai supported Hsieh's statements, comparing the Executive Yuan to the Eastern Depot a spy agency and secret police force during the Ming Dynasty.
