= Weather Girls =

Japanese idol group

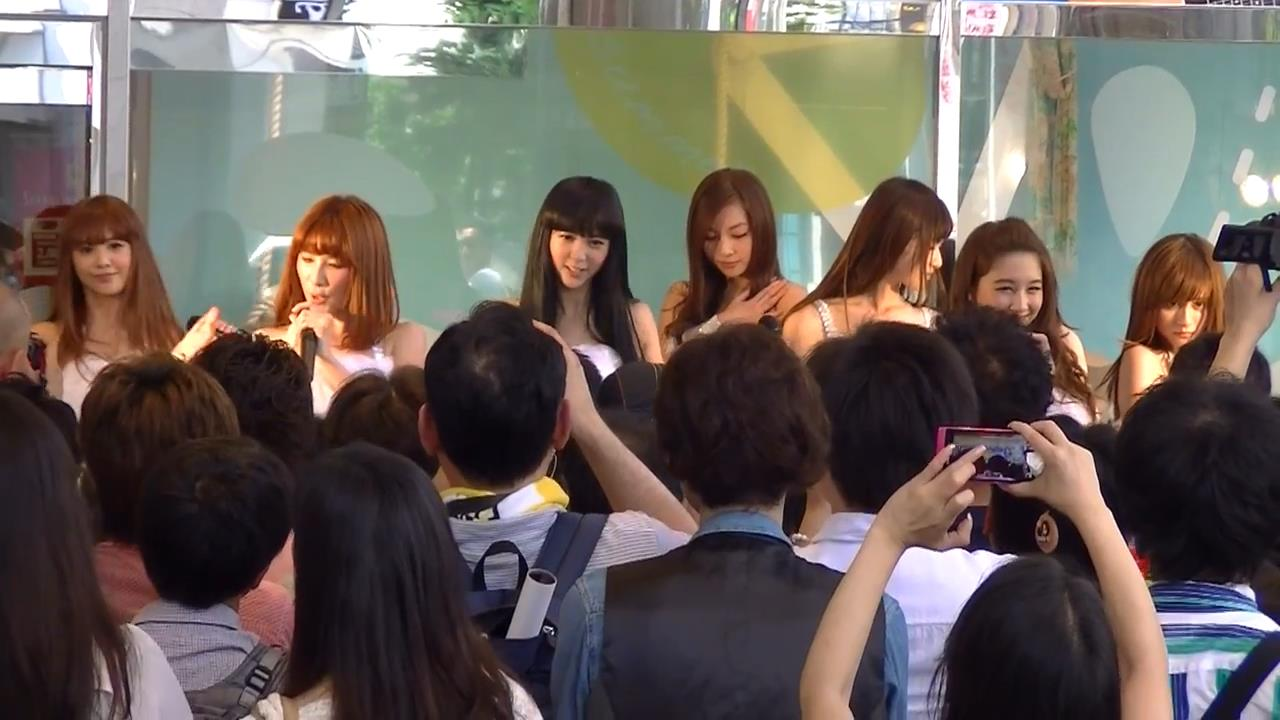
- Marui City, Shibuya, Tokyo, 7 July 2013. From left to right: Mia, Hi Jon, Mini, Yumi, NueNue, Dara, and Esse.

Background information
- Origin: Taiwan
- Genres: (Japan) J-pop; (Taiwan) C-pop
- Years active: Weathercasters: 2010–12; JAPAN: 2012–2014; TAIWAN :2014–2017
- Labels: (Japan) Pony Canyon; (Taiwan) FEMC
- Members: Dara; Hi Jon; Ria; Yumi
- Past members: Esse; Sindy; Mia; Mini; NueNue
- Website: (See below)

Weather Girls

Chinese name
- Traditional Chinese: 天氣女孩
- Simplified Chinese: 天气女孩
Transcriptions
Standard Mandarin
- Hanyu Pinyin: Tiānqì Nǚhái
- Wade–Giles: T'ien^{1}-ch'i^{4} Nü^{3}-hai^{2}

Japanese name
- Kana: ウェザーガールズ
Transcriptions
- Revised Hepburn: Uezā Gāruzu

Weather Girls is a group of Japanese idols from Taiwan. Originally, the group is formed in 2010 and acted as weather forecasters on television and the internet for Taiwan and the United States. After attracting attention in Japan, seven of its members, one for each day of the week, are selected to debut as an idol group in Japan in 2012. They are the first Taiwanese girl group to come to Japan.

In Japan, the group is under Pony Canyon and is managed by Ritz Productions. Jeff Miyahara is the producer of the group. After its debut, the group had continuously performed in all regions of the country. Its members had also starred in dramas, hosted television shows, and sung television theme songs. The group had released six Japanese singles, one Japanese album, and other work.

In 2013, the group also debuted as a musical group in Taiwan. The group issued a Mandarin album in the following year. In its homeland, the group is under FEMC and is managed by L Motion Entertainment. Its producer is Bryan Chen (陳國華).

== History ==
=== 2010–12: weathercasters ===
Desiring to produce a daily program featuring charming Taiwanese girls, Next TV Broadcasting Limited originated an idea of creating a daily weather forecast program to be distributed through television and the internet, with a group of cute young girls doing cosplay and dancing whilst reporting forecasts.

On 1 August 2010, Next TV formed a group of seven girls called "Weather Girls". The number of the members is later increased to fourteen and eventually thirty-four. The duties of the girls were to report weather forecasts or, in fact, to "keep eyes glued on TV sets", but not to serve as meteorologists. Each day of the week is hosted by a different girl who would introduce herself, dance in costume and deliver a short message to viewers in an adorable manner during the report.

The program theme is changed every month. For example, in the graduation theme, the weather reports were filmed at Shih Chien University and the girls dressed up in Japanese school uniforms and spoke in Japanese. The themes of Chinese New Year, company internship, environmentalism, flight attendants, ninja, and tokusatsu had also been used. Furthermore, the costumes, music, and visuals were changed in each theme.

As the forecasts were for Taiwan and the United States, the girls spoke in English, Mandarin and Japanese. Lester Shih (奚岳隆), creator of the program, said the Japanese versions were not originally intended for Japanese audience, but merely an expression of Japanese style of cuteness. On television, the forecasts were broadcast daily during the afternoon, evening, and late news.

Regarding the idea of producing the program, Shih said:

The weather report was just a means for us to get a daily program together, with the opportunity to show off different girls each day. Currently, we only report on the weather in Taiwan and America, but in the near future we want to add the Japanese weather so we can increase our audience, and maybe even add Thailand and other places around the world.

Sunday Girl NueNue, one of the members later selected to form an idol group in Japan, stated: "We all learn about it a bit in school [...], though I still don't know too much about weather forecasting." According to her, the idea of Next TV was to "make weather fun" since "weather reports are usually dull because it's just someone telling you that it's going to be sunny or it's going to rain, etc."

The program became highly popular, especially in Japan where it was introduced by many Japanese programs in April 2012. The program was terminated and the group was dissolved after some of its members became an idol group in Japan.

=== 2012: debut as idol group in Japan ===
==== Debut in Japan ====
After having appeared on Japanese programs in April 2012, the group attracted much attention in Japan. Seven of its members, most skilled in singing and dancing, were then chosen to debut in Japan as an idol group which is also titled "Weather Girls". They are the first Taiwanese girl group to come to Japan.

On 8 August 2012, the news of Weather Girls debut was officially announced. In Japan, the group was under Pony Canyon and was represented by Ritz Productions. Jeff Miyahara was the producer of the group. At a press conference, a Pony Canyon representative said:

Weather Girls [...] have been born out of Taiwanese culture where so many creators have been influenced by Japanese culture, like games and anime. On top of that, a performance that involves dancing while announcing the weather is fresh and interesting, so the girls have individuality.

Friday Girl Mini stated: "I have been fond of Japan since my childhood days and I have been wishing I could live there someday. I have also been longing to become a singer. Being able to fulfill these dreams of mine is such a wonderful feeling." Saturday Girl Yumi, leader of the group, added that she and her fellow members wished to appear on the annual music show Kōhaku Uta Gassen (紅白歌合戦) and to become weather forecasters in Japan as well.

On 10 August 2012, the group held its debut performance at the A-Nation festival.

For their Japanese career, the seven girls were required to take Japanese courses, in addition to dance lessons and performance rehearsals. Their language studies were broadcast on television once a week. Since 23 September 2012, they had also been fixed guests on the show @TV Akihabara (@TV秋葉原) which aired every Sunday and aimed to educate viewers on different forms of Japanese culture.

==== First single, "Koi no Tenki Yohō" ====
In September 2012, the first single of the group, "Koi no Tenki Yohō", was announced. On 30 September 2012, the music video of the title track was officially released. The music video published on YouTube had attracted more than one million views.

On 17 October 2012, the single was physically released in two editions, regular and limited. The CDs in both editions contain the title track, and a B-side, "Loving Pass – Koi no Password", as well as the instrumental versions thereof. The limited edition was also accompanied by a special DVD containing the music video and a video of the girls introducing themselves.

=== 2013: first Japanese album and debut in Taiwan ===
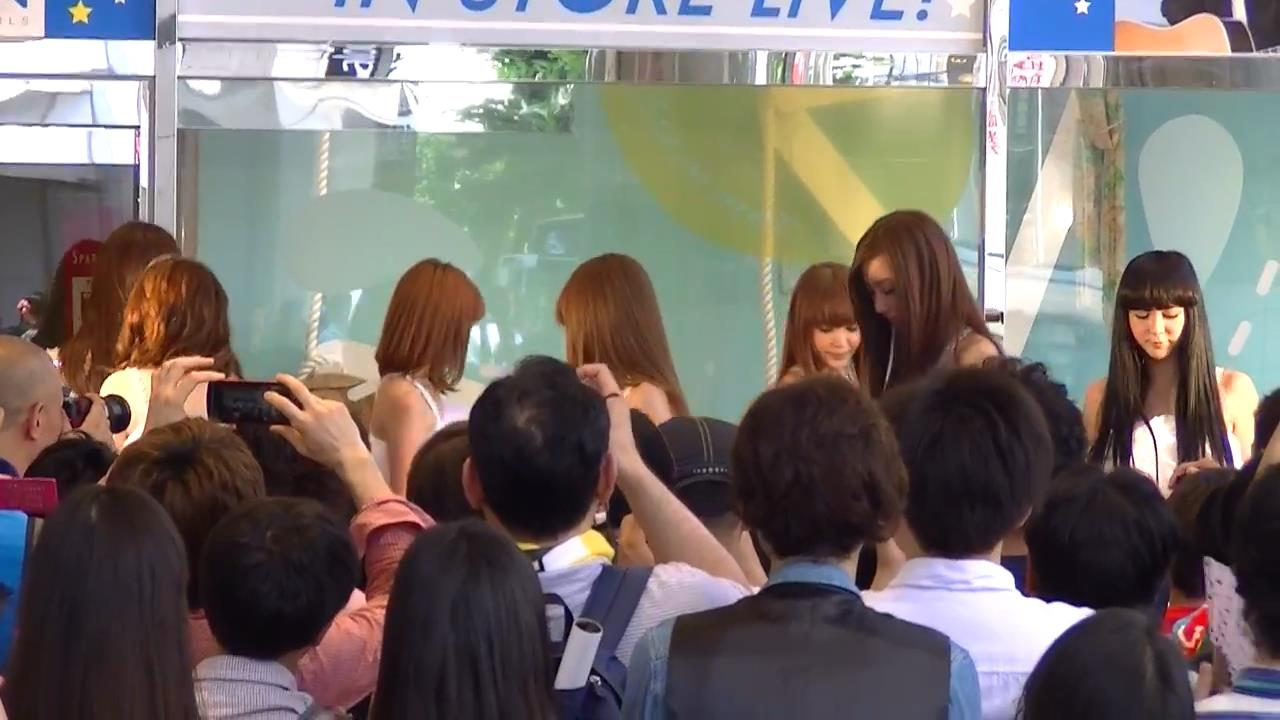
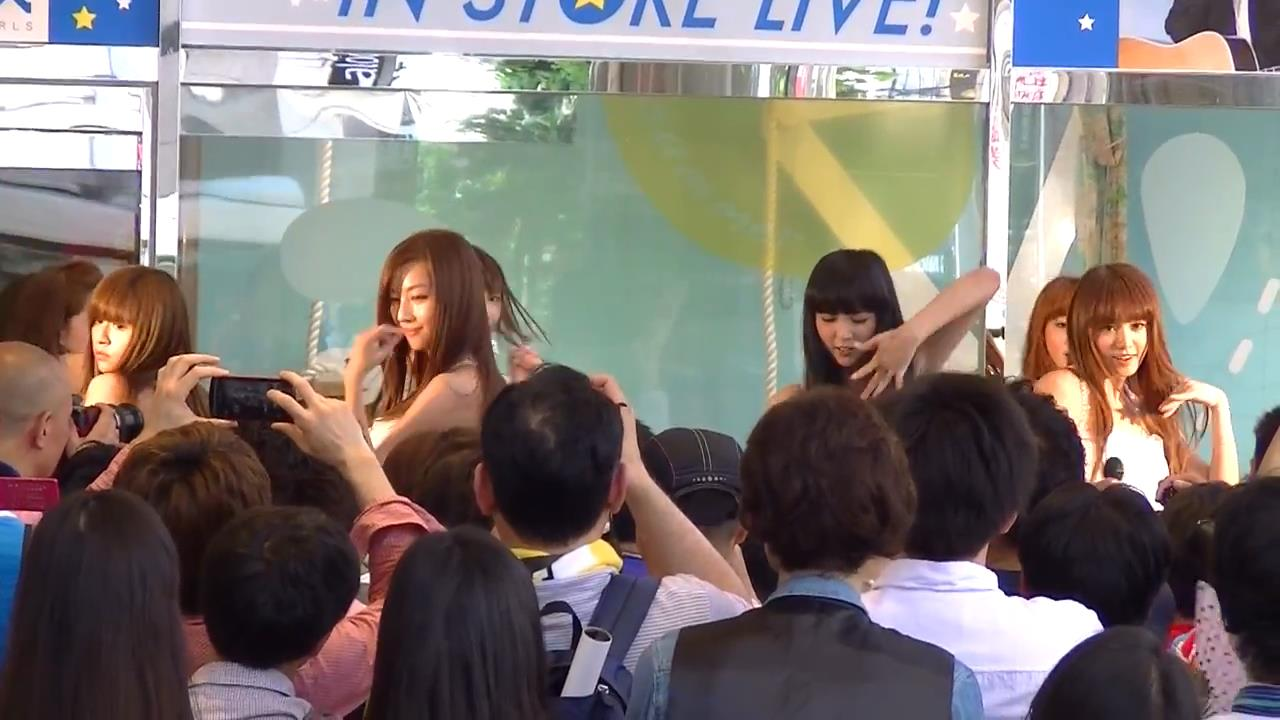
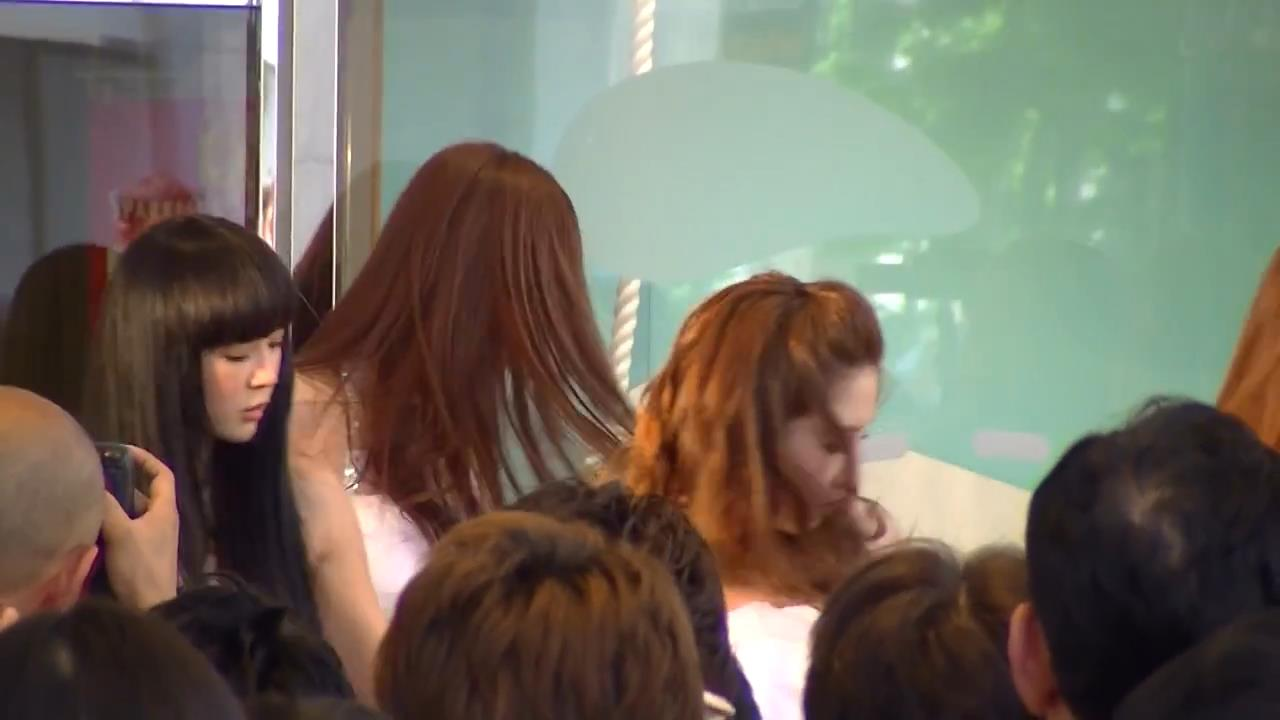

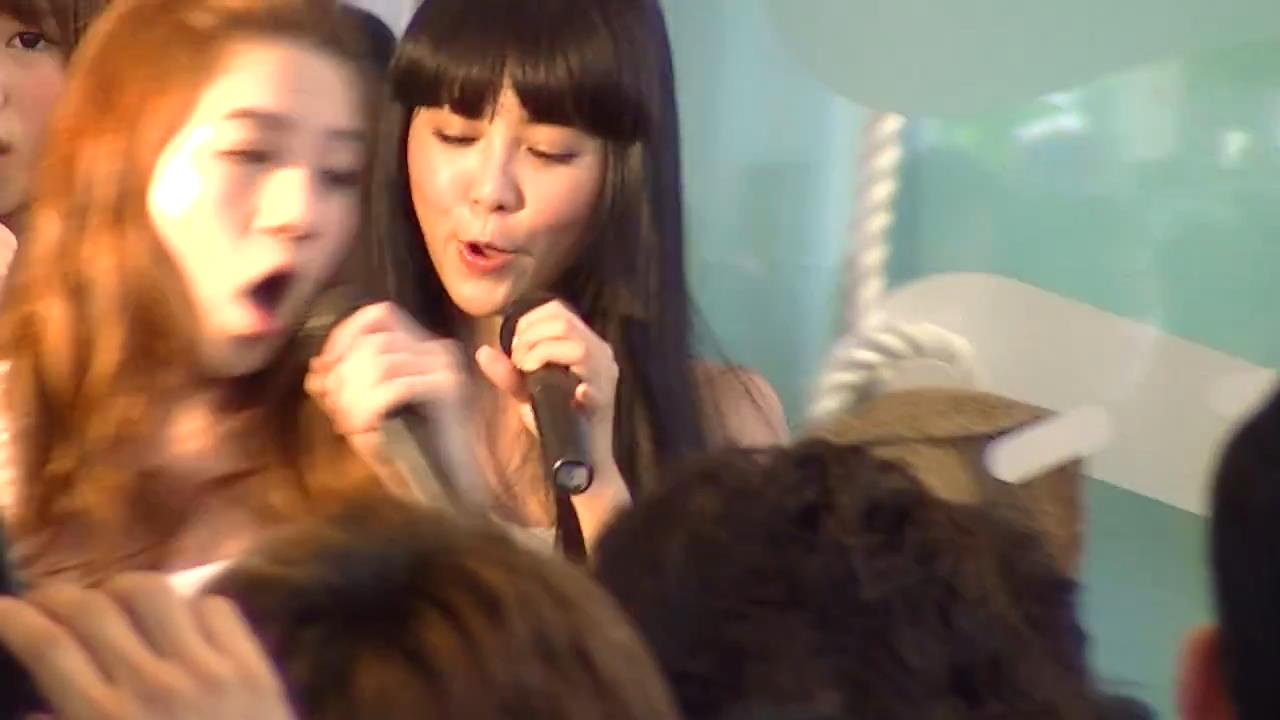
Weather Girls at their first Japanese album event, Marui City, Shibuya, Tokyo, 7 July 2013.

In 2013, Weather Girls saw additional developments in Japan. The group released three singles and one full-length album. The group also enjoyed opportunities to regularly appear on television, as it launched its first television show and first television drama. In addition, the girls decided to take a tough national examination to become licensed weather forecasters in Japan and took the whole year to prepare themselves for it. At the end of the year, the group also debuted in its homeland Taiwan and Wednesday Girl Dara had her own contract terminated, thereby leaving the group.

==== Second and third singles, "Koi wa Tokimeki Chūihō" and "Koi no Love – Sunshine" ====
On 25 December 2012, the second single of the group, "Koi wa Tokimeki Chūihō", was announced. On 6 February 2013, it was physically released. On 31 January 2013, the music video of the title track was released.

On 5 June 2013, the group's third single, "Koi no Love – Sunshine", was released . On 25 April 2013, the music video of the title track was released. The sailor swimsuits, the concept costumes for this single, were designed by Junko Isogai (磯谷淳子) from the fashion house Dexi.

==== Weathercaster licence exam ====
On 17 May 2013, it was revealed that the group would take Japan's National Weather Forecasting Licence Examination to become legitimate weather forecasters in the country, in addition to its idol career. The examination has been held biannually since 1994, reportedly with a five percent pass rate.

For the sake of the examination, the group took meteorological classes where a licensed weather forecaster gave lectures and fans were allowed to be present. These classes were called Absolutely Pass! (絶対合格！). On 25 January 2014, the group took the examination. On 9 May 2014, the last class took place at Pony Canyon Headquarters in Tokyo.

==== First Japanese album, Weather Girls ====
On 17 May 2013, the first album of the group, called Weather Girls, was announced. On 3 July 2013, it was physically issued. The eponymous album contains six new songs and four hit songs from the previous singles. The songs vary from dance-pop to ballad.

With the theme of clouds, the concept art of the album was described as follows: "Weather Girls, wearing fluffy marshmallow clouds, come to Japan riding on 'bomb anticyclone'". The cloud outfits, the concept costumes for this album, were again designed by Junko Isogai from the fashion house Dexi.

From its debut to the end of July 2013, the group had made a total of one hundred and one public performances. On 11 August 2013, the group performed at the A-Nation festival once again.

==== Fourth single, "Hey Boy – Weishenme?", as well as first TV show and drama ====
On 19 August 2013, it was announced that the fourth single of the group, titled "Hey Boy – Weishenme?", would be released in autumn 2013.The release date was later announced to be 20 November 2013.

The title track served as the ending theme of Attack Shimasukedo Nani Ka?, a new television show hosted by the group. On 19 October 2013, several networks began airing the show.

On 6 September 2013, Secret Chores Group, a thirty-one-episode series produced by Next TV started to be broadcast in Japan. Set in 2030, the sci-fi dramedy was about a group of six girls charged with secret investigative missions, played by the members of the group, save Thursday Girl Mia.

==== Debut in Taiwan and retirement of Wednesday Girl ====
On 1 October 2013, Wednesday Girl Dara vacated her membership. On 15 October 2013, the group's management agency, Ritz Productions, released a statement that her contract was terminated due to her repeated abandonment of work, despite its successive warnings and encouragement.

On 7 October 2013, it was announced that the group also debuted as a musical group in its homeland Taiwan. On the same day, the group made its presence in Taipei where it held a debut performance, a press conference, and a contract signing ceremony. In Taiwan, the group is under FEMC.

On 5 November 2013, the group issued its first Mandarin song called "Wei Wo Jiayou" which served as the official theme song for the Super Basketball League (SBL) tenth season. On the same occasion, it was announced that the group would be the official spokesperson of the SBL during its eleventh season. On 7 November 2013, the music video of "Wei Wo Jiayou" was released.

=== 2014: first Mandarin album ===
In 2014, the group obtained a new Wednesday Girl, Ria, before releasing two singles and appearing in a television drama in Japan. It also released its first Mandarin album in its homeland and continued to work in both countries. In addition, its members were appointed anti-piracy ambassadors by a Japanese copyright protection organisation. Late this year, Tuesday Girl Ice left the group.

==== New Wednesday Girl and fifth single, "Tomorrow World" ====
On 24 January 2014, a Taiwanese girl nicknamed Ria was selected to replace Dara as Wednesday Girl. At the same time, it was announced that the fifth single of the group, "Tomorrow World", would be released on 5 March 2014. Roles of Ria commenced from this single.

The title track, "Tomorrow World", is deemed a new aspect of the group, as it was the group's first medium tempo song. Besides, its lyrics are about graduation season after which a new world of graduates begins, and convey the significance of friendship, whilst most of the group's earlier released songs concern natural seasons and romantic love.

On 17 February 2014, the music video of "Tomorrow World" was premiered. It was shot on the rooftop of a five-hundred-metre-tall building in Taipei with certain landmark buildings in the background, including Taipei 101 and Taipei City Hall.

==== Anti-piracy ambassadors and video game characters ====
On 27 January 2014, the Content Overseas Distribution Association, a Japanese private organisation supported by the Japanese and Taiwanese governments and having the objective to promote copyright protection at regional level in Asia, appointed the members of the group as Japanese–Taiwanese Goodwill Ambassadors to promote anti-piracy campaigns in both countries. On 22 February 2014, the inauguration was held at the art museum Spot Hushan in Huashan 1914 Creative Park, Taipei, where the girls were given the titles "Japanese–Taiwanese Copyright Protection Commanders" (日台著作権保護隊長).

On 28 January 2014, International Games System released a dance video game, We Dancing Online 3, featuring the group members as new characters, as well as its hit song "Koi no Tenki Yohō". The game also includes the costumes and scenes appearing in the music videos of the group.

==== Further entertainment shows ====
On 4 April 2014, the group became regular cast on Kosaka Daimaō No Idol Club, a radio show hosted by comedian Daimaou Kosaka and broadcast every Friday by Nippon Broadcasting System.

On 7 April 2014, Nagoya Broadcasting Network started broadcasting Tetsuko no Sodatekata, a television drama in which the group appeared as a group of railway idols called "Railway Girls" (鉄道ガールズ). Directed by Tomoyuki Furumaya, the drama was adapted from the 2014 seinen manga of the same name written by Hiroshi Kawasumi.

On 25 April 2014, Gala Television began airing in Taiwan every Friday We Are Coming, a comedy show directed by George Chang (張兆志) and starring the group. Despite having gained very high ratings, it was announced on 4 July 2014 that the show would be terminated at the end of July 2014. The announcement came immediately after the concurrent resignation of some of the crew and cast members, including Producer Sun Lexin (孫樂欣) and Actor Tai Chih-yuan.

On 1 October 2014, the group launched a one-hour internet show called Let's Go Live. The show was live broadcast every Wednesday night on its official channel at Livehouse.in. During the show, viewers could participate in the chat room discussions on the channel and could phone in. The group later issued more internet shows on the same website: Ustyle × Tianqi Nuhai Tebie Qihua broadcast every Thursday night from 20 November 2014 and Ptt Zhoubao × Tianqi Nuhai broadcast every Monday night from 12 January 2015.

==== Sixth single, "Like You – Anyway" ====
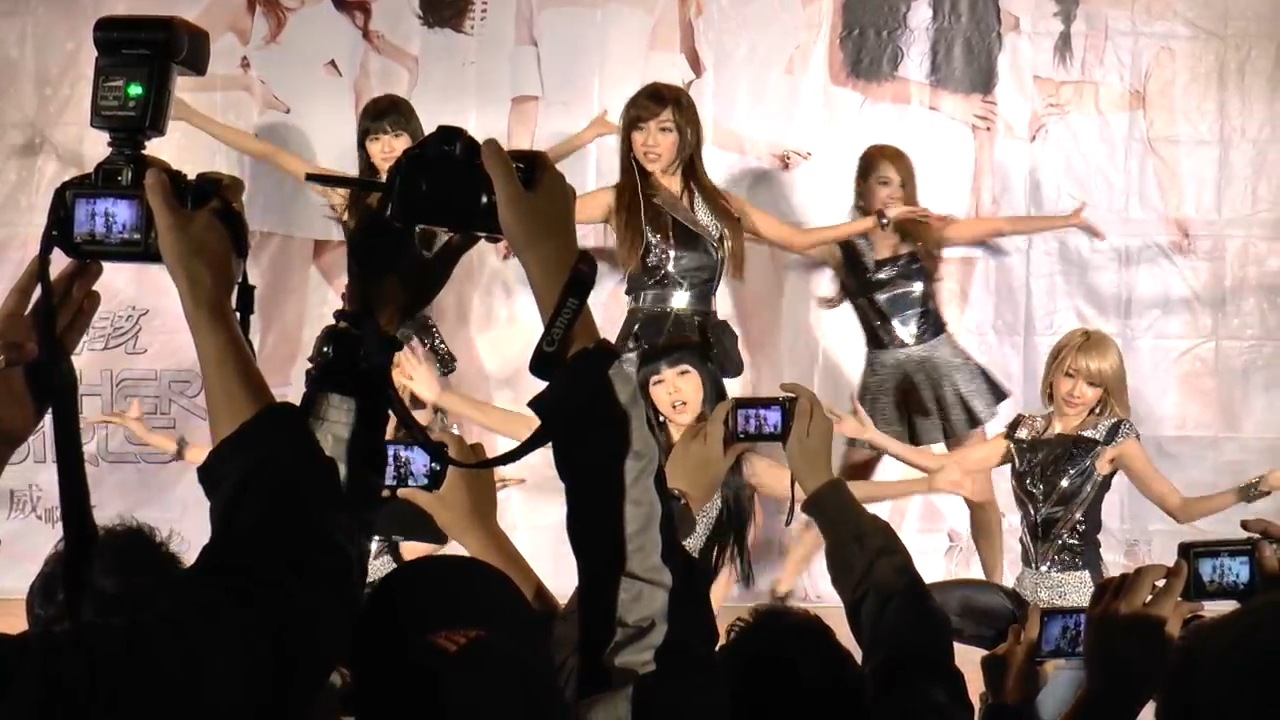
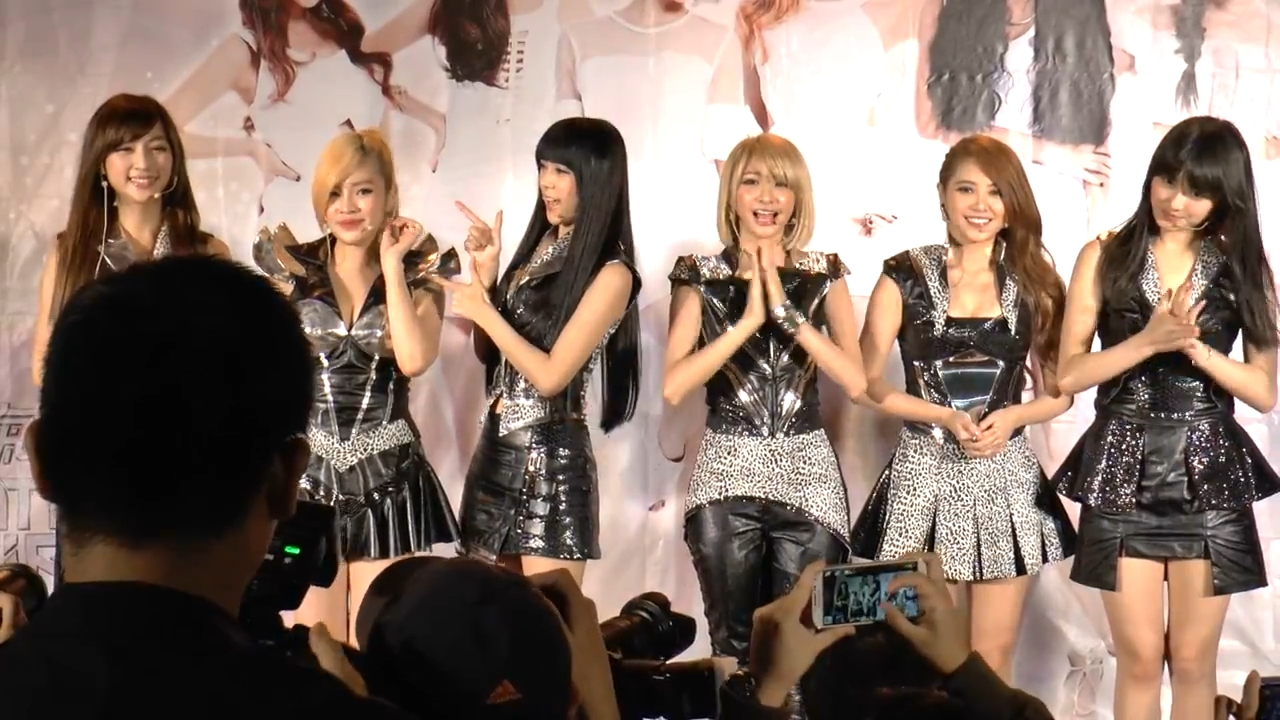

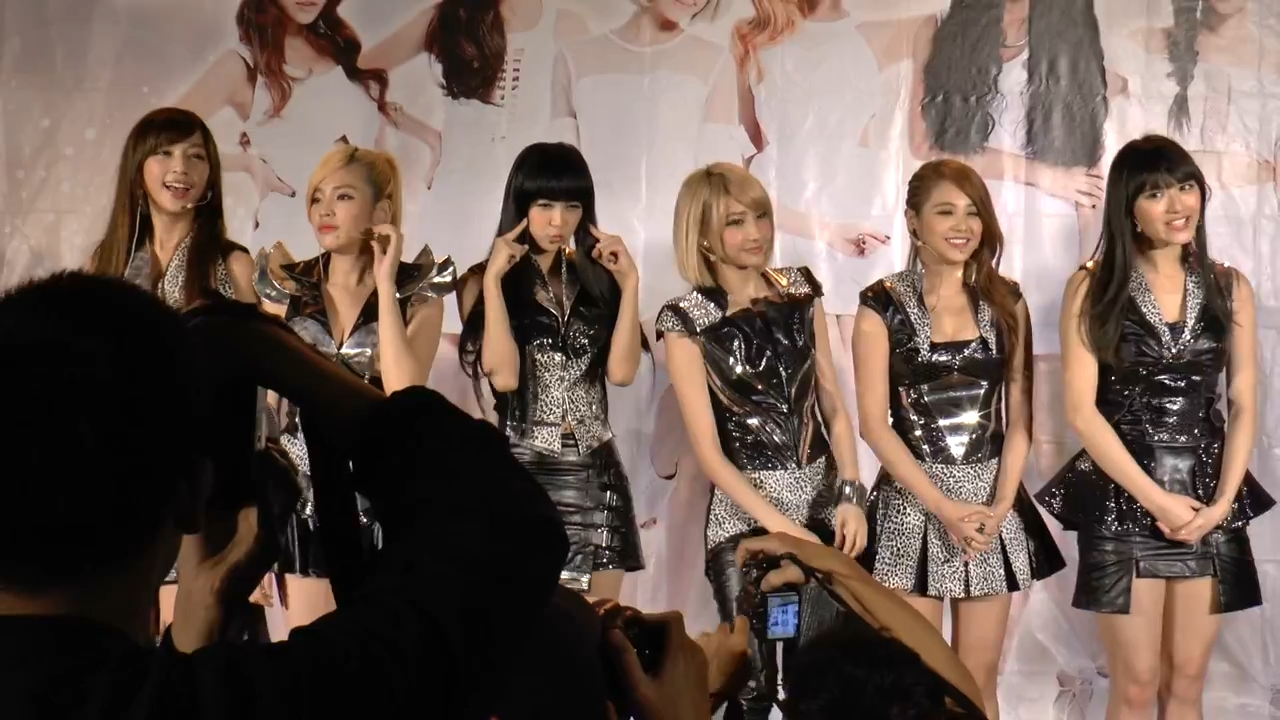
Weather Girls at their first Mandarin album event, Taichung, 23 November 2014.

On 7 April 2014, the sixth single of the group, "Like You – Anyway", was announced. On 4 June 2014, the single was physically released. The title track was used as the ending theme of the previously mentioned drama Tetsuko no Sodatekata. Premiered on 1 May 2014, the music video of "Like You – Anyway" was shot at a Pony Canyon studio in Chigasaki, Kanagawa. The theme of the single is summer vacation. Instead of matching uniforms as in the preceding singles, the concept outfits for this single are casual summer dresses consisting of white tops and colourful shorts and skirts.

On 3 June 2014, the group celebrated its sixth single by holding an activity in which its members one by one published one hundred articles on their Ameba blog within one day. As they succeeded in their activity, these girls became the first Taiwanese artists carrying out such activity and the first Taiwanese people succeeding therein.

==== First Mandarin album, Wei A, and retirement of Tuesday Girl ====
On 10 February 2014, it was reported that the group was to release a Mandarin album in Taiwan.

On 4 July 2014, the group premiered a Mandarin song called "Wo Shi Boss" at Taoyuan International Baseball Stadium where Brother Elephants and Lamigo Monkeys launched their baseball match series called Bao Wen Pa (豹紋趴) and the group members served as the ceremonial first pitchers. The song is the theme song for CSTV's Boss Sports Channel (博斯運動頻道).

On 1 October 2014, Tuesday Girl Esse declared on her Facebook fanpage that she vacated her membership on 23 September 2014 for personal reasons.

On 25 October 2014, there was an announcement that Wei A, the first Mandarin album of the group, would be released in Taiwan on 1 November 2014. The album contains ten songs: two previously released songs and eight newly composed songs.The production of the album was the collaboration between many famous Taiwanese musicians, including Bryan Chen (陳國華), Cai Zhengxun (蔡政勳), Chase Chang (張傑), Jacky Chen (陳建瑋), Jiujiu (九九), Lu Weixiao (魯維孝), Tina Wang (王雅君), and Yu Xuan (于萱).

On 27 October 2014, several songs from the album were premiered on radio. On the release date, the group held an autograph session marking the launching of the album at Ximending, Taipei. Within a few days after its release, the album became the fourth-best-selling album in the country.It was ranked the third-best seller at the end of November 2014.

On 8 November 2014, the music video of the title song, "Wei A", was premiered. On 2 December 2014, the music video of another song from the album, "Don't Cry", was issued.

=== 2015: Mini's injury ===
In 2015, the group continued to carry out activities in its homeland, Taiwan. On 24 January 2015, it performed at the annual grand event Super Star (超級巨星紅白藝能大賞), the Taiwanese version of Kōhaku Uta Gassen. The event took place at Taipei Arena and was broadcast on 18 February 2015, the eve of the Chinese New Year.

On 18 February 2015, The Wonderful Wedding, a Taiwanese film starring the group, was also released.

On 2 June 2015, Friday Girl Mini informed on her Facebook that she has an injury on her backbone. She then asked the Taiwanese company, FEMC, for a long break to receive proper physical therapy treatment. However, the date of Mini's return is still an unknown.

=== 2016: new TV program and Daikin CF ===
On 7 January 2016, a new travel TV program called, HI! LET'S GO (嗨!LET'S GO), hosted by Weather Girls, is aired on Asia Travel(亞洲旅遊台). In March 2016, Weather Girls endorsed Daikin air conditioner. The company partnered up with the group by giving them a new identity called, "DKR32", as well as released a special MV to promote the new Daikin air conditioner.

=== Mia departure and disbandment announcement ===
In October 2016, Mia announced that she would leave Weather Girls. WGSx7 was released as the last public event in October, and Weather Girls will continue to participate with a new member. The newly joined Korean member Sindy officially unveiled at the public event on May 11, 2017. However, on November 1, 2017, Shiquan Entertainment cancelled the contract with Weather Girls for commercial reasons and disbanded the group.

== Controversy ==
Due to success of Weather Girls, the Mainland China Guangdong Television set up a group of weather reporting girls called "Pinkopie" (蘋果派 Píngguǒ Pài; "Apple Pie") to produce a like program in December 2011. In January 2012, Next TV responded to the Chinese group with a press release describing the program as "plagiarism" and condemning the Chinese authority for its lack of copyright protection laws.

== Members ==
Members List
Stage name					Birth name			Birth date/place	In charge of		
Official ROM	Japanese	Chinese			SC	TC	PY	Birth date/place	Day of the week	Element	Color
Official ROM	Japanese	SC	TC	PY	SC	TC	PY	Birth date/place	Day of the week	Element	Color
Dara	ダラ	小奶昔	小奶昔	Xiǎonǎixī	卓昔洁	卓昔潔	Zhuō Xījié	7 September; Taipei	Wednesday	Cloud	Red
Hi Jon	ハイジャン	嗨奖	嗨獎	Hāijiǎng	郑筠熹	鄭筠熹	Zhèng Yúnxī	27 September 1988; Chiayi	Monday	Lightning	Green
Ria	リア	梨亞	梨亞	Líyà	林梨亞	林梨亞	Lín Líyà	8 October 1996; Keelung	Wednesday	Cloud	Red
Yumi (Leader in Japan)	ユミ	采薇	采薇	Cǎiwēi	林采薇	林采薇	Lín Cǎiwēi	5 March 1984; Taipei	Saturday	Fog	Purple
Former Members
Esse	エース	艾丝	艾絲	Àisī	刘玳妍	劉玳妍	Liú Dàiyán	18 August 1991; Kaohsiung	Tuesday	Rain	Orange
Mia	ミア	小米儿	小米兒	Xiǎomǐ'er	庄心怡	莊心怡	Zhuāng Xīnyí	12 June 1983; Taichung	Thursday	Sun	Blue
Mini (Leader in Taiwan)	ミニ	米尼	米尼	Mǐní	林怡慧	林怡慧	Lín Yíhuì	30 June 1984; Tainan	Friday	Snow	Pink
NueNue	ニューニュー	妞妞	妞妞	Niūniū	赵静仪	趙靜儀	Zhào Jìngyí	4 October 1991; Taipei	Sunday	Wind	Yellow
Sindy	ホンソル	红雪	紅雪	Hóngxŭe	朴类娜	朴類娜	Park Yu Na	18 September; Incheon	Thursday	Sun	Blue

== Discography ==
=== Japanese singles ===
Single #	Single Information	Track Listing	Oricon
1st	恋の天気予報 (Weather Forecast of Love; Koi no Tenki Yohō): Released: 17 October 2012; Editions: Regular, Limited; Formats: CD, CD+DVD	Track Listing CD: 1. "恋の天気予報"; 2. "Loving Pass ～恋のパスワード～" (Loving Pass~Love Password~; Loving Pass~Koi no Password~); 3. "恋の天気予報" (Instrumental); 4. "Loving Pass ～恋のパスワード～" (Instrumental); DVD: 1. "恋の天気予報" (Music Video); 2. "メンバー個人自己紹介VTR" (Members' self introduction VTR)	29
2nd	恋はトキメキ注意報 (Heartbeat Storm Warning is Love; Koi wa Tokimeki Chūihō): Released: 6 February 2013; Editions:Regular, Limited; Formats: CD, CD+DVD	Track Listing CD: 1. "恋はトキメキ注意報"; 2. "キミ予報" (Your Forecast; Kimi Yohō); 3. "恋はトキメキ注意報" (Instrumental); 4. "キミ予報" (Instrumental); DVD: 1. "恋はトキメキ注意報" (Music Video)	35
3rd	恋のラブ♥サンシャイン (Love of Love♥Sunshine; Koi no Love♥Sunshine): Released: 5 June 2013; Editions:Regular, Limited; Formats: CD, CD+DVD	Track Listing CD: 1. "恋のラブ♥サンシャイン"; 2. "Tonight's Weather"; 3. "恋のラブ♥サンシャイン" (Instrumental); 4. "Tonight's Weather" (Instrumental); DVD: 1. "恋のラブ♥サンシャイン" (Music Video)	27
4th	HEY BOY～ウェイシェンモ?～ (HEY BOY~For What Reason?~; HEY BOY~Weishenmo?~): Released: 20 November 2013; Editions: Regular, Limited 1, Limited 2; Formats: CD, CD+DVD, CD+DVD	Tracking Listing Regular: 1. "HEY BOY～ウェイシェンモ?～"; 2. "OMG!"; 3. "Loving Pass～恋のパスワード～" (Chinese Version) (Loving Pass~Love Password~; Loving Pass~Koi no Password~); Limited 1: 1. CD; 1. "HEY BOY～ウェイシェンモ?～"; 2. "OMG!"; 3. "HEY BOY～ウェイシェンモ?～" (Instrumental); 4. "OMG!" (Instrumental); 2. DVD; 1. "HEY BOY～ウェイシェンモ?～" (Music Video); 2. "HEY BOY～ウェイシェンモ?～" (Behind the Scenes); Limited 2: 1. CD; 1. HEY BOY～ウェイシェンモ?～; 2. "Loving Pass～恋のパスワード～" (Chinese Version); 3. "HEY BOY～ウェイシェンモ?～" (Instrumental); 4. "Loving Pass～恋のパスワード～" (Chinese Instrumental Version); 2. DVD; 1. "ウェザーガールズはじめての沖縄" (Weather Girls' First Time in Okinawa)	54
5th	Tomorrow World: Released: 5 March 2014; Editions: Regular, Limited 1, Limited 2; Formats: CD, CD+DVD, CD+DVD	Track Listing Regular: 1. "Tomorrow World"; 2. "Talk Talk Talk"; 3. "Tomorrow World" (Instrumental); 4. "Talk Talk Talk" (Instrumental); Limited 1: 1. CD; 1. "Tomorrow World"; 2. "Talk Talk Talk"; 2. DVD; 1. "Tomorrow World" (Music Video); Limited 2: 1. CD; 1. "Tomorrow World"; 2. "Talk Talk Talk"; 2. DVD; 1. "Tomorrow World" (Behind the Scenes)	44
6th	Like You ♡ Anyway: Released: 4 June 2014; Editions: Regular, Limited 1, Limited 2; Formats: CD, CD+DVD, CD+DVD	Track Listing Regular: 1. "Like You ♡ Anyway"; 2. "為我加油" (Cheer for Me; Wèi Wǒ Jiāyóu); 3. "Like You ♡ Anyway" (Instrumental); 4. "為我加油" (Instrumental); LImited 1: 1. CD; 1. "Like You ♡ Anyway"; 2. "為我加油"; 2. DVD; 1. "Like You ♡ Anyway" (Music Video); Limited 2: 1. CD; 1. "Like You ♡ Anyway"; 2. "為我加油"; 2. DVD; 1. "Like You ♡ Anyway" (Behind the Scenes)	44

=== Japanese album ===
Album #	Album Information	Track Listing	Oricon
1st	WEATHER GIRLS: Released: 3 July 2013; Format: CD	Track Listing: 1. "恋の天気予報" (Weather Forecast of Love; Koi no Tenki Yohō); 2. "恋のラブ♥サンシャイン" (Love of Love♥Sunshine; Koi no Love♥Sunshine); 3. "恋のラブビーム" (Lovebeam of Love; Koi no Lovebeam); 4. "恋はトキメキ注意報" (Heartbeat Storm Warning is Love; Koi wa Tokimeki Chūihō); 5. "CHEWING GUM -チューインガム-" (CHEWING GUM); 6. "カミナリDay" (Thunder Day; Kaminari Day); 7. "Cherry Cherry Boom Boom"; 8. "Loving Pass～恋のパスワード～" (Loving Pass~Love Password~; Loving Pass~Koi no Password~); 9. "Because of You -ひとりの夜-" (Because of You-Alone in the Night-; Because of You-Hitori no Yoru-); 10. "涙の雨" (Rain of Tears; Namida no Ame)	67

=== Mandarin Album ===
Album #	Album Information	Track Listing
1st	威啊 (Power Ah; Wei A): Released: 1 November 2014; Format: CD	Track Listing: 1. "威啊" (Power Ah; Wei A); 2. "為我加油" (Cheer for Me; Wèi Wǒ Jiāyóu); 3. "Don't Kiss Me"; 4. "戀愛預報" (Love Forecast; Liàn'ài Yùbào); 5. "不解釋" (No Explanation; Bù Jiěshì); 6. "元氣" (Vitality; Yuánqì); 7. "Hey Mr. DJ"; 8. "全能甜心" (All-around Sweetheart; Quánnéng Tiánxīn); 9. "Don't Cry"; 10. "我是 Boss" (I'm Boss; Wǒ Shì Boss)

==== Other songs ====
#	Title	Release date	Notes
1	"Wei Wo Jiayou" 為我加油 Wèi Wǒ Jiāyóu "Cheer for Me"	7 November 2013	Theme song for the Super Basketball League tenth season; later included in the sixth Japanese single and the first Mandarin album
2	"Wo Shi Boss" 我是Boss Wǒ Shì Boss "I'm Boss"	4 July 2014	Theme song for CSTV's Boss Sports Channel (博斯運動頻道); later included in the first Mandarin album
3	"DKR32"	10 March 2016	Daikin air conditioner commercial song

== Videography ==
=== Video collections ===
Video #	Video Information	Track Listing	Oricon
1st	ウェザーガールズTV Vol.1 (Weather Girls TV Vol. 1): Released: 20 March 2013; Format: DVD	Track Listing: 1. "お天気スタジオ1" (Weather Studio 1; Otenki Sutajio 1); 2. "恋の天気予報 (Music Video Dance Shot Version)" (Weather Forecast of Love; Koi no Tenki Yohō); 3. "お天気スタジオ2" (Weather Studio 2); 4. "恋の天気予報 (メイキング映像)" (Weather Forecast of Love – Behind the Scenes); 5. "お天気スタジオ3" (Weather Studio 3); 6. "日本語力で対決!" (Japanese Ability Test!; Nihongochikara de taiketsu!); 7. "お天気スタジオ4" (Weather Studio 4); 8. "恋はトキメキ注意報 (Music Video Dance Shot Version)" (Heartbeat Storm Warning is Love; Koi wa Tokimeki Chūihō); 9. "恋はトキメキ注意報 (メイキング映像)" (Heartbeat Storm Warning is Love – Behind the Scenes); 10. "お天気スタジオ6" (Weather Studio 6); 11. "ジェスチャーゲームで対決!" (Face-off with Charades!; Jesuchāgēmu de Taiketsu!); 12. "ジェンガで対決!" (Face-off with Jenga!; Jenga de Taiketsu!); 13. "罰ゲーム 巨大風船アタック!?" (Penalty Game with Bubble Attack!?; Batsu Gēmu Kyodai Fūsen Atakku!?); 14. "お天気スタジオ7" (Weather Studio 7); 15. "密着ウェザーガールズ vol.2" (Follow Up Weather Girls, vol. 2; Mitchaku Uezā Gāruzu vol. 2); 16. "お天気スタジオ8" (Weather Studio 8); 17. "大縄跳びに挑戦!!" (Challenge to Skipping Rope!!; Dai Nawatobi ni Chōsen)	—N/a
2nd	CLIPS ♡: Released: 3 September 2014; Formats: Blu-ray	Track Listing Music Videos: 1. "恋の天気予報" (Weather Forecast of Love; Koi no Tenki Yohō); 2. "恋はトキメキ注意報" (Heartbeat Storm Warning is Love; Koi wa Tokimeki Chūihō); 3. "恋のラブ♥サンシャイン" (Love of Love♥Sunshine; Koi no Love♥Sunshine); 4. "HEY BOY～ウェイシェンモ?～" (HEY BOY~For What Reason?~; HEY BOY~Weishenmo?~); 5. "Tomorrow World"; 6. "Like You ♡ Anyway"; Bonus Videos: 1. "ウェザーガールズ パジャマパーティ in 台湾" (Weather Girls' Pajama Party in Taiwan); 2. "蔵出し映像" (Behind the Scenes Video; kuradashi eizō)	57

=== Video games ===
- 2014: We Dancing Online 3 (唯舞獨尊3 Wéi Wǔ Dú Zūn 3)

=== Music videos ===
Year	Title	Director(s)
2012	"恋の天気予報" (Weather Forecast of Love; Koi no Tenki Yohō)	Lester Shih
2013	"恋はトキメキ注意報" (Heartbeat Storm Warning is Love; Koi wa Tokimeki Chūihō)	Lester Shih
2013	"恋のラブ♥サンシャイン" (Love of Love♥Sunshine; Koi no Love♥Sunshine)	Lester Shih
2013	"HEY BOY～ウェイシェンモ?～" (HEY BOY~For What Reason?~; HEY BOY~Weishenmo?~)	Hideyuki Kato
2013	"為我加油" (Cheer for Me; Wèi Wǒ Jiāyóu)	Lester Shih
2014	"Tomorrow World"	Sū Wén Shèng
2014	"Like You ♡ Anyway"	Hideyuki Kato
2014	"我是 Boss" (I'm Boss; Wǒ Shì Boss)	Lài Wěi Kāng
2014	"威啊" (Power Ah; Wei A)	Lester Shih
2014	"Don't Cry"	Yīn Zhèn Háo
2016	"DKR32"	Shū Yí Huá, Yáo Guó Fēng

=== Music video appearances ===
Year	Title	Artist(s)	Member	Director
—N/a	"恨幸福來過" (Hèn Xìng Fú Lái Guò)	Li Dong Xue	Yumi	Vincent Fang
2015	"Happy, Come Cha-Cha" (歡喜來恰恰; Hoa Hee Lai Cha Cha)	Jacky Chen, Ric, Daniel Luo, Kuo Chin-fa	Mia	Lester Shih

== Filmography ==
=== Films ===
Year	Country	Title	Member(s)	Role
2015	Taiwan	大囍臨門; The Wonderful Wedding	Hi Jon	Gao Helen
2015	Taiwan	大囍臨門; The Wonderful Wedding	Esse	Li Shu Fen's co-worker
2015	Taiwan	大囍臨門; The Wonderful Wedding	Ria	Li Shu Fen's co-worker
2015	Taiwan	大囍臨門; The Wonderful Wedding	Mia	Li Shu Fen's co-worker
2015	Taiwan	大囍臨門; The Wonderful Wedding	Mini	Li Shu Fen's co-worker
2015	Taiwan	大囍臨門; The Wonderful Wedding	Yumi	Li Shu Fen's co-worker
2015	Taiwan	大囍臨門; The Wonderful Wedding	NueNue	Li Shu Fen's co-worker
2016	China	暴力甜心; Trans-sweety	NueNue	Qianxi
2016	Taiwan	惡魔軟妹幫	NueNue	Xiǎoyīng

=== Short films ===
Year	Country	Title	Member(s)	Role
2014	Taiwan	男人的小確幸	Mini	Florist
2014	Taiwan	男人的小確幸	Yumi	Guest
2015	Taiwan	遇上200%的你; Meeting the 200% You	Mini	Macy
2015	Taiwan	遇上200%的你; Meeting the 200% You	NueNue	Ah Ching (阿晴)

=== Television dramas ===
Title	Country	Network	Date	Member(s)	Role
雜務特勤組; Secret Chores Group (ザツムトッキングミ)	Japan	C-POP TV	6 September 2013 – 4 April 2014	Hi Jon	Ota (オタ)
雜務特勤組; Secret Chores Group (ザツムトッキングミ)	Japan	C-POP TV	6 September 2013 – 4 April 2014	Esse	Kitty (キティ)
雜務特勤組; Secret Chores Group (ザツムトッキングミ)	Japan	C-POP TV	6 September 2013 – 4 April 2014	Dara	Yè Kěxīn (葉可欣, イエ・カーシン)
雜務特勤組; Secret Chores Group (ザツムトッキングミ)	Japan	C-POP TV	6 September 2013 – 4 April 2014	Mia	Jennifer (珍妮花)
雜務特勤組; Secret Chores Group (ザツムトッキングミ)	Japan	C-POP TV	6 September 2013 – 4 April 2014	Mini	Fix
雜務特勤組; Secret Chores Group (ザツムトッキングミ)	Japan	C-POP TV	6 September 2013 – 4 April 2014	Yumi	Méiguī (玫瑰, メイグイ)
雜務特勤組; Secret Chores Group (ザツムトッキングミ)	Japan	C-POP TV	6 September 2013 – 4 April 2014	NueNue	Lín Bǎolì (林寶莉, リン・バオリー)
鉄子の育て方; Tetsuko no Sodatekata (How to Train a Lady of Steel)	Japan	Nagoya TV	7 April 2014 – 23 June 2014	All	鉄道ガールズ (Railroad Girls)
孤独のグルメ; Kodoku no Gourmet	Japan	TV Tokyo	23 October 2015	Ria	Guest
孤独のグルメ; Kodoku no Gourmet	Taiwan	GoldSunTV	13 May 2016	NueNue	Guest
我家是戰國; War Family	Taiwan	GTV	24 March 2016 – 18 May 2016	NueNue	Lu Qiaozhen (魯巧真)

=== Internet dramas ===
Title	Country	Network	Date	Member(s)	Role
恐怖高校劇場: 天氣女孩畢旅夢靨! Horror High School Theater: Weather Girls' Nightmare Trip!	Taiwan	Coture	21 January 2015	Yumi	Yumi
恐怖高校劇場: 天氣女孩畢旅夢靨! Horror High School Theater: Weather Girls' Nightmare Trip!	Taiwan	Coture	21 January 2015	NueNue	妞妞(NueNue)
愛呀，午休時刻-寂寞; Love, Lunch Break-Loneliness	Taiwan	Coture	24 July 2015 – 10 August 2015	NueNue	艾莉絲 (Alice)
星座研究室: OL逆襲 辦公室的復仇; Horoscope Research Lab EP #23	Taiwan	Coture	1 September 2015	Yumi	范范 (Fan Fan)
星座研究室: 求婚者的十二道陰影; Horoscope Research Lab EP #24	Taiwan	Coture	30 September 2015	NueNue	Girlfriend
星座研究室: 拒絕加班 OL的怒吼; Horoscope Research Lab EP #34	Taiwan	Coture	11 November 2015	Yumi	Office lady
星座研究室: 別讓服飾店員不開心！奧客排行榜！ Horoscope Research Lab EP #51	Taiwan	Coture	10 March 2016	NueNue	奧客 (Rude customer)
Before & After: 一個人好 但不要單身到老; Before & After #2	Taiwan	Coture	8 June 2016	NueNue	Friend
Before & After: 職場裝閨蜜 老闆前捅你; Before & After #3	Taiwan	Coture	15 June 2016	NueNue	君君 (Jun Jun)
Before & After: 裝作不會喝 是怕嚇到你; Before & After #4	Taiwan	Coture	22 June 2016	NueNue	Girl
Before & After: 在男人面前 永遠都是小鳥胃; Before & After #5	Taiwan	Coture	29 June 2016	NueNue	Girlfriend
Before & After: 激情一夜 帥哥竟是小... Before & After #6	Taiwan	Coture	6 July 2016	NueNue	Girl
Before & After: 沒事找架吵 只怕你亂搞; Before & After #7	Taiwan	Coture	13 July 2016	NueNue	Friend

=== Television/Internet show hosts ===
Title	Date	Network	Member(s)	Country	Note
密著ウェザーガールズ; Follow Up Weather Girls	1 October 2012 – 26 November 2012	Music On! TV	All	Japan	Reality show
密著ウェザーガールズ Season II; Follow Up Weather Girls	4 February 2103 – 26 March 2013	Music On! TV	All	Japan	Reality show
ウェザーガールズ料理クィーン決定戦; Weather Girls Cooking Queen Competition	2 July 2013 – 8 October 2013	YouTube	All	Japan	Internet show
アタックしますけど何か? Attack Shimasukedo Nani Ka?	19 October 2013 – 21 December 2013	Nagoya TV	All	Japan	
アタックしますけど何か? Attack Shimasukedo Nani Ka?	21 October 2013 – 23 December 2013	Tokyo MX	All	Japan	
我們都來了; We Are Coming	25 April 2014 – 20 July 2014	GTV	All	Taiwan	
來氣玩; Let's Go Live	1 October 2014 – 11 February 2015	LIVEhouse	All	Taiwan	
全球中文音樂榜上榜; Global Chinese Music	10 January 2015; 30 May 2015; 14 November 2015; 28 November 2015; 26 December 2015; 11 March 2016; 4 June 2016	TVBS Entertainment Channel	Hi Jon; Yumi; Hi Jon, NueNue; Hi Jon, Yumi; Hi Jon, Yumi; Hi Jon, Yumi; Yumi, NueNue	Taiwan	Guest host
PTT週報 x 天氣女孩; PTT Weekly Reports x Weather Girls	12 January 2015 – 11 May 2015	LIVEhouse	All	Taiwan	Internet Live show
網路溫度計; Daily View	18 June 2015; 19 June 2015; 26 June 2015	冠軍夢想台	NueNue	Taiwan	Assistant host
HI!LET'S GO	7 January 2016 – 21 April 2016	Asia Travel	All; Okinawa: Yumi, NueNue; Tokyo: Mia, Yumi; Karuizawa: Mia, Yumi; Mie: Hi Jon, Ria; Hiroshima: Mia, Yumi	Taiwan	
HI!LET'S GO	14 January 2016 – 28 April 2016	Asia Travel (International version)	All; Okinawa: Yumi, NueNue; Tokyo: Mia, Yumi; Karuizawa: Mia, Yumi; Mie: Hi Jon, Ria; Hiroshima: Mia, Yumi	Singapore	

=== Variety shows appearances ===
2012 variety shows
Date	Network	Title	Member(s)
16 July 2012 – 20 July 2012	Fuji TV	NON STOP!	All
13 August 2012	Fuji TV	NON STOP!	All
15 September 2012	TBS	King's Brunch	All

2013 variety shows
Date	Network	Title	Member(s)
11 January 2013	J:COM	つながるGO!GO!	All
12 April 2013	Fuji TV	mu-Jack	All
1 May 2013	PigooHD	Reina Fujie presents GIRLS POP LIVE!!	All
6 May 2013	Nippon TV	Sôkai jôhô variety Sukkiri!!	All
13 May 2013	Fuji TV	NON STOP!	All
18 May 2013	TBS	情報7days ニュースキャスター	All
1 June 2013	TBS	King's Brunch	All
7 June 2013	J:COM	つながるGO!GO!	All
9 June 2013	BS-TBS	音ボケPOPS	All
21 June 2013	Kansai TV	mu-Jack	All
4 July 2013	Nippon TV	PON!	All
6 July 2013	TV Saitama	ウタ娘	All
27 July 2013	TBS	情報7days ニュースキャスター	All
25 August 2013	Nippon TV	24HOUR TELEVISION "LOVE SAVES THE EARTH"	All
8 November 2013	GTV	100% Entertainment	All
16 November 2013	CTV	萬秀豬王	All
27 November 2013	CTi Variety	Small Swallow Xiaoyan Night	All

2014 variety shows
Date	Network	Title	Member(s)
4 January 2014	EBC	絕對不單淳	All
4 January 2014	緯來育樂台	GX GAMING電競特區	All
5 January 2014	緯來育樂台	GX GAMING電競特區	All
8 January 2014	SET Metro	綜藝大熱門	All
15 January 2014	Star Chinese Channel	WOW！侯麻吉	All
17 January 2014	CTi Variety	Kangxi Lai Le	All
23 January 2014	GTV	100% Entertainment	All
30 January 2014	SET Metro	綜藝大熱門	All
28 March 2014	GTV	100% Entertainment	All
5 April 2014	GTV	100% Entertainment	All
2 May 2014	GTV	100% Entertainment	All
29 May 2014	SET Metro	The Gang of Kuo Kuan	All
7 June 2014	CBCテレビ	花咲かタイムズ	All
11 June 2014	SET Metro	The Gang of Kuo Kuan	Mini
16 June 2014	CTi Variety	Small Swallow Xiaoyan Night	Hi Jon, Mini, Yumi
19 November 2014	CTi Variety	Small Swallow Xiaoyan Night	All
26 November 2014	GTV	100% Entertainment	All
1 December 2014	SET Metro	綜藝大熱門	All
2 December 2014	GTV	100% Entertainment	Hi Jon, Mini, Yumi
3 December 2014	GTV	100% Entertainment	All
5 December 2014	GTV	100% Entertainment	All
10 December 2014	GTV	100% Entertainment	All
11 December 2014	GTV	100% Entertainment	All
16 December 2014	CTi Variety	University	All
18 December 2014	GTV	100% Entertainment	All
25 December 2014	Star Chinese Channel	歡樂智多星	All

2015 variety shows
Date	Network	Title	Member(s)
3 January 2015	GTV One	台灣好歌聲	All
10 January 2015	TVBS Entertainment Channel	Golden Chinese Music	All
18 February 2015	TTV	2015 Super Star	All
18 February 2015	Videoland Japan Channel	好吃好玩日本人遊台灣	All
22 February 2015	CTS Main Channel	Zhu Brother Super Show	Hi Jon, Ria, Mini, NueNue
4 March 2015	TVBS Entertainment Channel	Super Taste-stay the night in	Ria
18 March 2015	CTi Entertainment	麻辣同學會	Hi Jon, NueNue
25 March 2015	CTi Entertainment	麻辣同學會	Mini, NueNue
2 April 2015	CTi Entertainment	麻辣同學會	Mini, NueNue
20 April 2015	CTi Entertainment	麻辣同學會	Mini, NueNue
22 April 2015	GTV	100% Entertainment	Hi Jon, Ria, NueNue
1 May 2015	GTV	100% Entertainment	Hi Jon, Ria, Mia, NueNue
4 May 2015	GTV	100% Entertainment	All
4 May 2015	CTi Entertainment	麻辣同學會	Mini, NueNue
6 May 2015	TVBS Entertainment Channel	Super Taste-stay the night in	Hi Jon
14 May 2015	SET Metro	Stylish Man-The Chef	All
18 May 2015	GTV	100% Entertainment	Ria, Mia, NueNue
23 May 2015	TVBS Entertainment Channel	Global Chinese Music	Hi Jon
25 May 2015	GTV	100% Entertainment	All
13 June 2015	GSTV	我的閨房秘蜜	NueNue
18 June 2015	GTV	美味搜查線	All; *Mini started her long break at the beginning of June 2015
25 July 2015	TVBS Entertainment Channel	Global Chinese Music	All; *Mini started her long break at the beginning of June 2015
23 August 2015	EBC	Clash of Kings	Yumi, NueNue
30 August 2015	EBC	Clash of Kings	Yumi, NueNue
27 September 2015	TVBS Entertainment Channel	Global Chinese Music	All
20 October 2015	SET Metro	The Gang of Kuo Kuan	Hi Jon, Ria, Mia
14 November 2015	TVBS Entertainment Channel	Global Chinese Music	All
21 November 2015	TVBS Entertainment Channel	Global Chinese Music	Hi Jon, Ria, Yumi, NueNue
28 November 2015	TVBS Entertainment Channel	Global Chinese Music	Guest hosts: Hi Jon, Yumi; Ria
29 November 2015	CTS Main Channel	Zhu Brother Super Show	Hi Jon, Ria, Yumi
17 December 2015	GTV	100% Entertainment	Yumi
26 December 2015	SET Metro	Mr. Player	Yumi
2 January 2015	SET Metro	Mr. Player	Yumi

2016 variety shows
Date	Network	Title	Member(s)
6 February 2016	GTV One	台灣好歌聲	All
7 February 2016	GTV	100% Entertainment	Ria, Mia, Yumi
8 February 2016	MTV	Idols of Asia	Hi Jon, Ria, Mia, Yumi
9 February 2016	MTV	Idols of Asia	Hi Jon, Ria, Mia, Yumi
2 March 2016	SET Metro	Hot Door Night	Yumi
21 March 2016	Nagoya Broadcasting Network	ゲッターズ飯田の開運ツア-in台湾	Hi Jon, Ria
28 March 2016	GTV	100% Entertainment	NueNue
4 April 2016	GTV	100% Entertainment	NueNue
4 April 2016	SET Metro	Hot Door Night	Yumi
14 May 2016	SET Metro	Mr. Player	Yumi, NueNue
21 May 2016	SET Metro	Mr. Player	Yumi, NueNue
28 May 2016	TVBS Entertainment Channel	Global Chinese Music	Yumi, NueNue
4 June 2016	TVBS Entertainment Channel	Global Chinese Music	Ria, Yumi, NueNue
11 June 2016	TVBS Entertainment Channel	Global Chinese Music	Ria, Yumi, NueNue
18 June 2016	CTV Main Channel	全民一起來	All
2 July 2016	TVBS Entertainment Channel	Global Chinese Music	Yumi
16 July 2016	TVBS Entertainment Channel	Global Chinese Music	Ria, Yumi
2 August 2016	GTV	100% Entertainment	All
5 August 2016	CTi Variety	Small Swallow Xiaoyan Night	All
7 August 2016	CTV Main Channel	No Play No Life	All
11 August 2016	CTi Variety	Super Followers	Mia, Yumi
11 August 2016	SET Metro	Stylish Man-The Chef	All
12 August 2016	GTV	100% Entertainment	All
19 August 2016	SET Metro	Hot Door Night	All
20 August 2016	CTV Main Channel	全民一起來	All
26 August 2016	GTV	100% Entertainment	All
3 September 2016	SET Metro	Mr. Player	Hi Jon, Ria, Yumi, NueNue
10 September 2016	SET Metro	Mr. Player	Hi Jon, Ria, Yumi, NueNue
1 October 2016	TVBS Entertainment Channel	Global Chinese Music	Hi Jon, Ria
5 November 2016	TVBS Entertainment Channel	Global Chinese Music	NueNue
1 December 2016	Star Chinese Channel	Witty Star	Ria, Yumi
3 December 2016	TVBS Entertainment Channel	Global Chinese Music	Ria, Yumi

=== Internet shows ===
- Regular

Date	Country	Network	Title	Member(s)
5 August 2012 – 23 December 2012	Japan	Akiba.TV	日曜日の特別授業! ウェザーガールズのニッポンを勉強するバラエティ	All
4 February 2013 – 4 August 2014	Japan	Niconico	Ponycan Idol Club (ぽにきゃんアイドル倶楽部)	All

- Internet shows appearances

Internet shows appearances
Date	Country	Network	Title	Member(s)
22 July 2012	Japan	JOL Harajuku TV	今日の天気は!? おまかせウェザーガールズ!	All
22 July 2012	Japan	Akiba.TV	台湾のみなさんリーホゥー（こんにちは）	All
24 July 2012	Japan	NOTTV	notty★LIVE7時間!	All
26 July 2012	Japan	Niconico	Niconico News (夕刊ニコニコニュース)	All
4 February 2013	Japan	Niconico	生のアイドルが好き	All
11 November 2014	Taiwan	camerabay	King of Stewed Egg (魯蛋當家)	Hi Jon, Mia, Yumi
18 November 2014	Taiwan	LIVEhouse	大牌LIVEshow	All
19 November 2014	Taiwan	camerabay	Arc-Kuni (日本大遊民)	Ria, Mini, NueNue
20 November 2014	Taiwan	LIVEhouse	Ustyle × Weather Girls Special Feature (Ustyle × 天氣女孩特別企劃)	Ria, Mini
5 December 2014	Taiwan	LIVEhouse	Ustyle × Weather Girls Special Feature (Ustyle × 天氣女孩特別企劃)	Mia, NueNue
11 December 2014	Taiwan	LIVEhouse	Ustyle × Weather Girls Special Feature (Ustyle × 天氣女孩特別企劃)	Hi Jon, Yumi
18 December 2014	Taiwan	Kinpleradio	WeatherGirls	All
5 March 2015	Taiwan	FHMLive Channel	Weather Girls FaceTALK Live (FHM – 天氣女孩FaceTALK Live直播)WeatherGirls	All
7 August 2016	Taiwan	RC直播	當我們喇在一起	All

=== Radio shows ===
- Regular

Date	Country	Network	Title	Member(s)
18 April 2014 – 19 September 2014	Japan	NBS	Kosaka Daimaō no Idol Club (古坂大魔王のアイドル倶楽部)	All

- Radio shows appearances

2012 radio shows
Date	Country	Network	Title	Member(s)
10 August 2012	Japan	J-Wave	HELLO WORLD	All
1 September 2012	Japan	FM-FUJI	GEKIDAN SAMBA CARNIVAL (劇団サンバカーニバル)	All
18 October 2012	Japan	Japan FM Network	SCHOOL NINE	All

2013 radio shows
Date	Country	Network	Title	Member(s)
4 February 2013	Japan	USEN	星ひとみのミュージック・オーラ	All
10 February 2013	Japan	USEN	星ひとみのミュージック・オーラ	All
14 March 2013	Japan	JOLF	ミュ～コミ+プラス	Hi Jon, Mini
28 June 2013	Japan	Radio Nippon	峰竜太のミネスタ	Esse, Mini, NueNue
29 June 2013	Japan	InterFM	TECHNOS COLLEGE YOUNG BLOOD	Hi Jon, Esse, Mini
18 July 2013	Japan	Japan FM Network	SCHOOL NINE	All
24 October 2013	Japan	JOLF	ミュ～コミ+プラス	Hi Jon, Mini
16 November 2013	Japan	JOLF	古坂大魔王 ツギコレ	Mini
22 November 2013	Japan	ZIP-FM	SWAG#41	Esse, Mini, NueNue
23 November 2013	Japan	JOLF	古坂大魔王 ツギコレ	Mini
7 December 2013	Japan	JOLF	古坂大魔王 ツギコレ	Esse
21 December 2013	Japan	JOLF	古坂大魔王 ツギコレ	NueNue

2014 radio shows
Date	Country	Network	Title	Member(s)
4 January 2014	Japan	JOLF	古坂大魔王 ツギコレ	Hi Jon
1 February 2014	Japan	JOLF	古坂大魔王 ツギコレ	Yumi
2 March 2014	Japan	NACK5	～IDOL SHOWCASE～ i-BAN!!	Esse, Mia, Mini, NueNue
8 March 2014	Japan	JOLF	古坂大魔王 ツギコレ	Esse, Mini, NueNue
15 March 2014	Japan	JOLF	古坂大魔王 ツギコレ	Esse, Mini, NueNue
17 March 2014	Japan	J-Wave	HELLO WORLD	Esse
18 March 2014	Japan	J-Wave	HELLO WORLD	Esse
6 June 2014	Japan	J-Wave	HELLO WORLD- ENTERTAINMENT STREAM F	Esse
28 September 2014	Japan	FMCiao	今夜はParty魔法でナイト ハイジャン誕生日お祝いSP	All
5 October 2014	Japan	FMCiao	今夜はParty魔法でナイト ニューニュー、リア誕生日SP	All
17 November 2014	Taiwan	CityFM	城市好有FU	All
17 November 2014	Taiwan	ICRT	The Jam	All
23 November 2014	Taiwan	Asia FM	青春亞洲	All
12 December 2014	Taiwan	i like radio	Midnight You and Me	All
