= CTS News and Info =

Television channel of Taiwan

- Country: Republic of China (Taiwan)
- Broadcast area: Taiwan, Asia Pacific, EMEA, & Americas
- Network: Chinese Television System

Programming
- Picture format: 1080i HDTV

Ownership
- Owner: Chinese Television System (Taiwan Broadcasting System)

History
- Launched: 2004 (as CTS Recreation); 2012 (as CTS News and Info)
- Former names: CTS Recreation

Availability

Terrestrial
- Digital: Channel 20

Streaming media
- YouTube: Live feed

CTS News and Info (Chinese: 華視新聞資訊台; pinyin: Huáshì Xīnwén Zīxùn Tái; Wade–Giles: Huashih Hsinwen Tzuhsün T'ai) is a digital television 24-hour news channel operated by Chinese Television System (CTS) in Taiwan. It used to be CTS Recreation (Chinese: 華視休閒頻道) until September 10, 2012.

On April 19, 2021, CTS News and Info Channel took over Taiwan's Cable Channel 52 replaced the rival CTi News, owned by the Want Want China Times Group after the National Communications Commission approved CTS News and Info Channel's transfer from cable channel 130 to cable channel 52.

== Opening and Closing times ==
CTS Main Channel is on air 24 hours each day.

Except for the last Thursday of every month at 4 AM, it will be closed for one hour for system testing, and then the broadcast will resume at 5 AM.
