= 831 (band) =

Taiwanese band

- Origin: Taiwan
- Years active: 2003–present
- Labels: B'in Music; Rock Records; Republic Records; Sony Music Taiwan
- Members: A Dian (Chinese: 阿電); Xiao Ju (Chinese: 小橘); Liu Bi (Chinese: 劉逼); A Pu (Chinese: 阿璞); Ba Tian (Chinese: 霸天)

The Last Day of Summer 831 (Chinese: 八三夭; pinyin: Bā Sān Yāo), is a Taiwanese band that debuted in 2007 with five members, ADian, Xiao Ju, Liu Bi, A Pu, Ba Tian. One of their better known songs is Miss You 3000 from 2019.

== History ==
Five high school students started 831 on August 31, 2003. The band chose the name 831 because it refers to day they started the band, which was the final day of summer before they would start their final year of high school. 831's members are Xiao Ju (小橘), who plays the keyboard and provides the chorus; Liu Bi (刘逼), who plays the guitar; A Pu (阿璞) who provides the guitars and sings; ADian (阿电), who plays the drums; and Ba Tian (霸天), who plays the bass. In 2008, "Save the World", 831's inaugural album, was issued by Universal Music Taiwan, and fewer than three years later the band issued their next album, "The Great Escape". 831 performed the beginning theme song for the third season of the Channel V show Circus Action which aired between 2007 and 2008. 831 issued the album "Survival Guide" in December 2016.

The Special Broadcasting Service's Michelle Chen said 831 is "referred to as the "Asian Simple Plan" due to their versatile music styles ranging from punk rock to pop rock, electronic, metal and hip-hop". They became popular after they released the song "Eastern District, Eastern District" (Chinese: 東區東區). TVBS's Ruiyao Dai wrote that 831 "is loved by many students because of its passionate and positive songs".

== Members ==
=== ADian (阿電) ===
- Real name: Cai Yi zhan (蔡易展)
- Alias: Dan Tsai
- Date of birth: 25 November 1982
- Place of birth:
- Position: Drummer

=== Xiao Ju (小橘) ===
- Real name: Yang Jia Yun (楊佳運)
- Alias: Orange Yang
- Date of birth: 1 November 1984
- Place of birth:
- Position: Pianist

=== Liu Bi (劉逼) ===
- Real name: Liu Yan Hui (劉彥輝)
- Alias: Alec Liu
- Date of birth: 11 November 1984
- Place of birth:
- Position: Guitar

=== A Pu (阿璞) ===
- Real name: Li Xian Pu (李賢璞)
- Alias: Up Lee
- Date of birth: 27 February 1985
- Place of birth:
- Position: lead singer

=== Ba Tian (霸天) ===
- Real name: Deng You Zong (鄧有宗)
- Alias: Sky Deng
- Date of birth: 18 July 1985
- Place of birth:
- Position: Bass guitar
