= Chinese Television System =

Taiwanese television broadcast company

Chinese Television System Inc.
- Type: Free-to-air nationwide TV
- Branding: CTS
- Country: Taiwan
- First air date: October 31, 1971; 55 years ago
- Availability: Taiwan (Free area); Japan (Yonaguni Island)
- Founded: October 7, 1971; 55 years ago
- Owner: Taiwan Public Television Service Foundation
- Official website: www.cts.com.tw

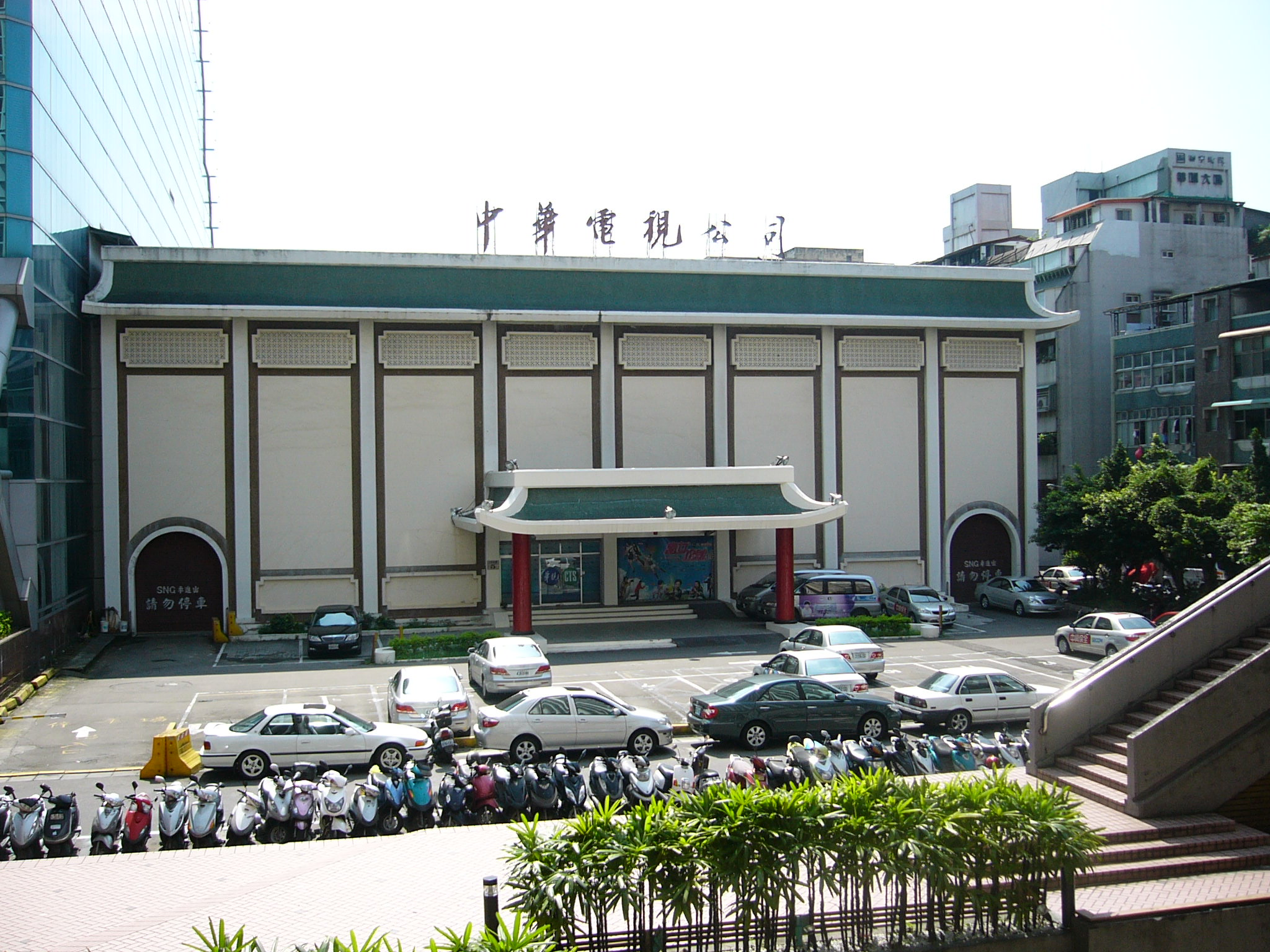
CTS Building 1: Studio Building

The Chinese Television System Inc. (Chinese: 中華電視公司; pinyin: Zhōnghuá Diànshì Gōngsī; Pe̍h-ōe-jī: Tiong-hôa-tiān-sī-kong-si; Zhuyin Fuhao: ㄓㄨㄥ ㄏㄨㄚˊ ㄉㄧㄢˋ ㄕˋ ㄍㄨㄥ ㄙ) is a terrestrial television station in Taiwan and was founded in 1971. Recent milestones of the network are in sports events, including having the distinction to offer exclusive coverage of the 2017 Summer Universiade, which was held in Taipei. This included airing the opening and closing ceremonies, plus major games, and it enabled its YouTube channel with several options to watch the rest of the games. Due to recent interest in soccer in Taiwan triggered by the success of its national team, it also bought the rights to broadcast on its free-to-air waves the 2018 FIFA World Cup for all matches from the round of 16 to the end of the tournament, thereby becoming the only channel which offered an event often reserved to cable TV channels.

== History ==
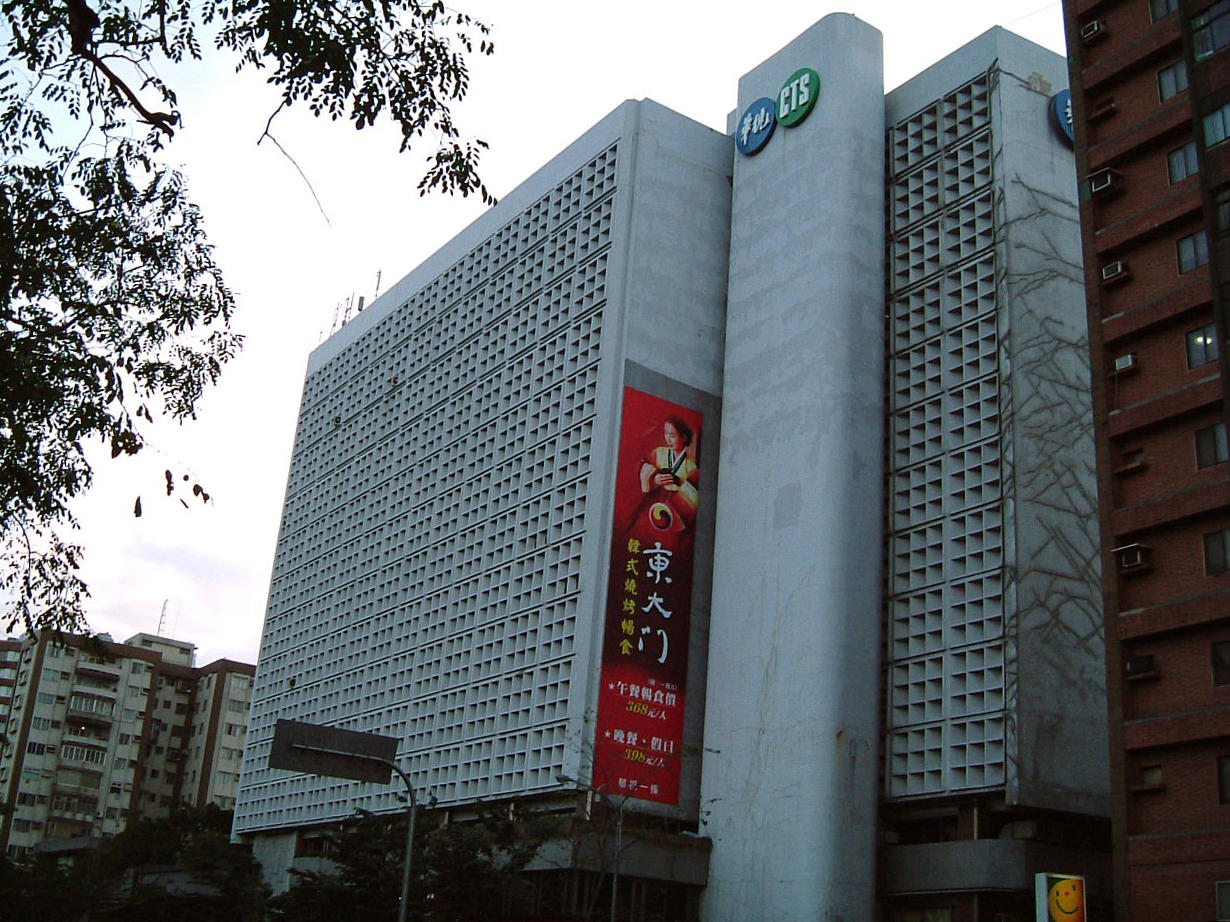
CTS Building 2: CTS Building

In early 1968, Lieutenant General Wang Sheng, deputy director of the General Political Operations Department of the Ministry of National Defense (now the Political Operations Bureau of the Ministry of National Defense), proposed the establishment of a third TV station. The Ministry of National Defense negotiated with the Ministry of Education to obtain a willingness to cooperate. On December 6, 1968, Minister of Defense Chiang Ching-kuo and Minister of Education Yan Zhenxing agreed to cooperate to expand the Educational Television Broadcasting Station (Network of Educational Television) into China Television based on the following needs:

1. National education in the Republic of China has been extended to nine years. Due to the limited capacity of schools above high school, the problem of out-of-school youth has become increasingly serious. The Ministry of Education believes that by expanding a third TV station and establishing a television network, it can operate an air school to educate out-of-school youth and achieve "the ideal of reading without being separated from production" has achieved universal results with a very small number of teachers.
2. The National Army of the Republic of China has implemented patriotic education, in-camp remedial education, reserve soldier education, retired officers and soldiers employment guidance and education, recreational activities, etc. for many years and has been effective. Due to the scattered locations of various armies, it is difficult to find teachers, and many difficulties arise during implementation. The Ministry of National Defense believes that if television is used to unify teaching, it will achieve twice the result with half the effort.
3. Educational television stations are extremely limited in terms of equipment and funds. Without timely and appropriate updates, it will be difficult for them to achieve their mission.

Founded on October 31, 1971, CTS began as a joint venture between the Republic of China Ministry of National Defense and the Ministry of Education. In its inception, CTS was the only VHF television channel on the island of Taiwan. In 1998, the channel was commissioned by the Republic of China to provide an "Electronic Government" program, which would act as an informational source for government workers.

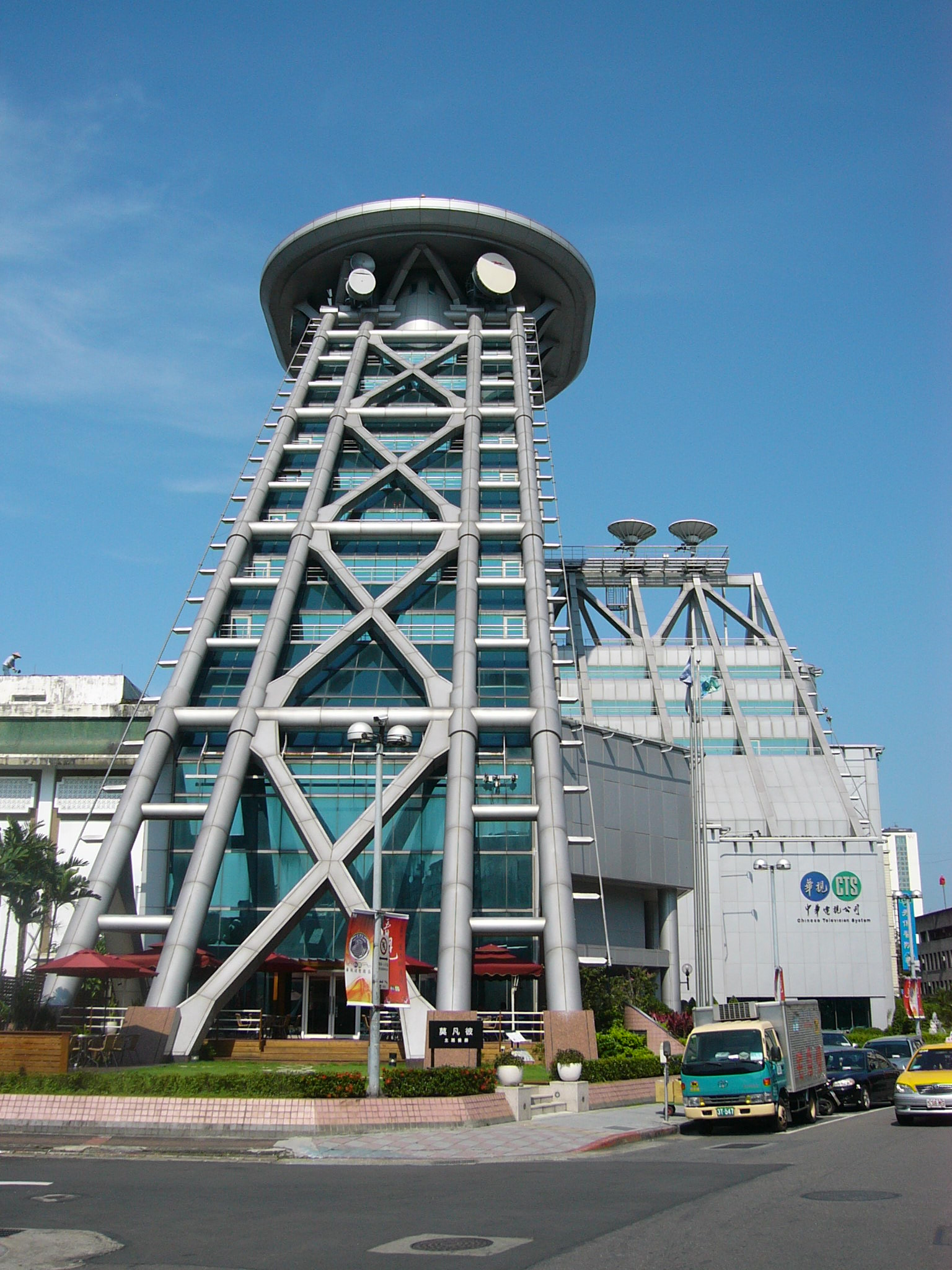
CTS Building 3: TV Production Building

On July 1, 2006, by virtue of the government's media reform law, the channel was incorporated into the Taiwan Broadcasting System (TBS) (the island state's consortium of public television stations) with Public Television Service (PTS) being the other member of the group. The new structure called for the transfer of the station's main studios from Taipei to Kaohsiung over a span of five years. Afterwards, it was allowed to continue to generate income through traditional advertisements and maintain its 60-40 ratio of entertainment to news programming.

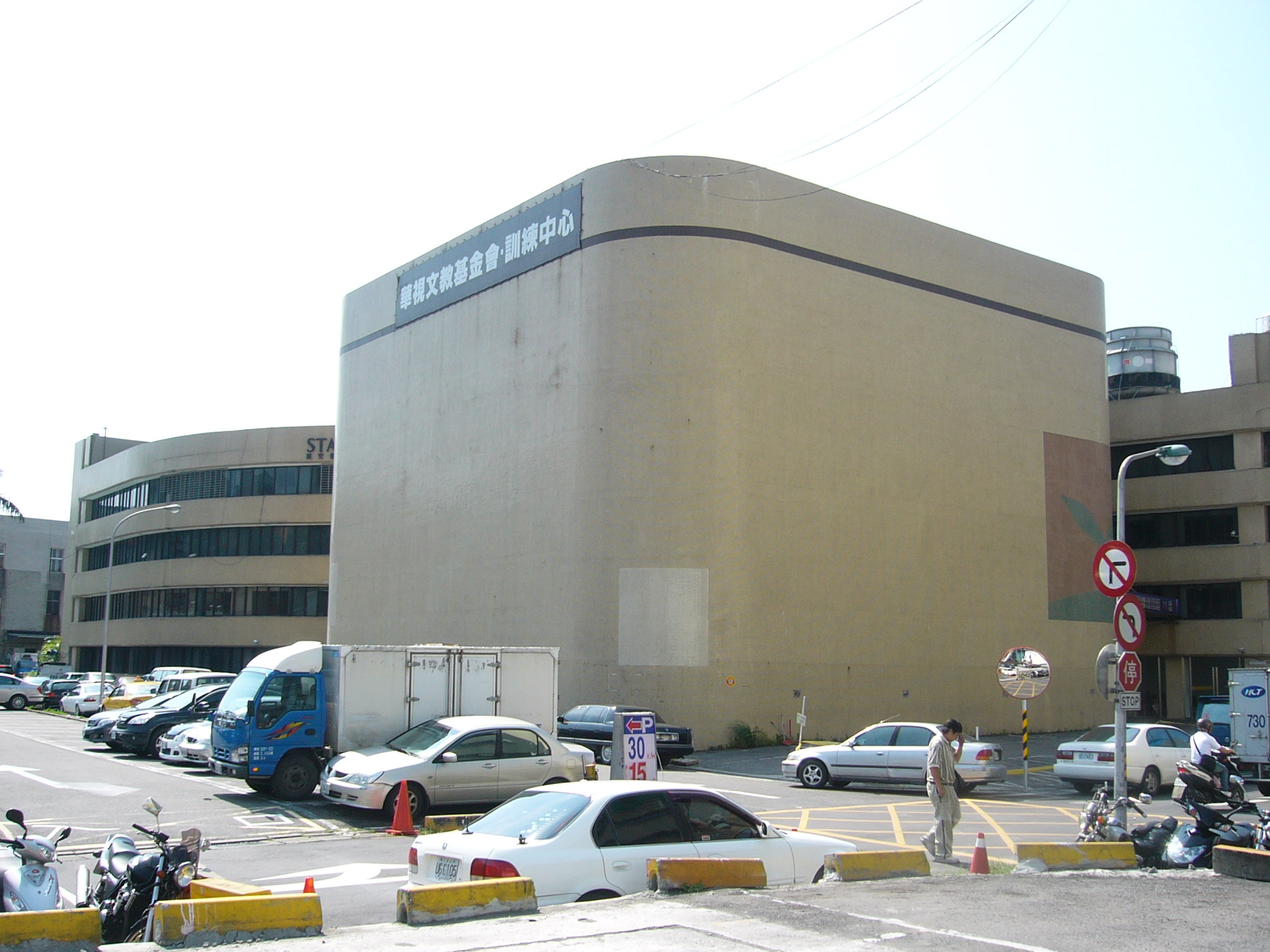
CTS Building 4: UHF Studio & Administrative Building, all 4 buildings are in Taipei City

Given its reputation as the network wherein many of Taiwan's best dramas were broadcast, CTS today is active in an ongoing campaign to restore its status as the official drama channel of Taiwan.

On April 19, 2021, CTS News and Info Channel took over Taiwan's Cable Channel 52 replaced the rival CTi News, owned by the Want Want China Times Group after the National Communications Commission approved CTS News and Info Channel's transfer from cable channel 130 to cable channel 52.

== Notable programs aired by CTS ==
Birth of Heart (風雨生信心) was the CTS's first drama which aired in 1977 simultaneously over TTV, CTV, and CTS.

Today (今天), one of CTS's most popular women's magazine shows, aired from 1972 to 1988. It won the prestigious Golden Bell Awards three times (in 1982, 1985, and 1988).

The Variety 100 (綜藝100) was hosted by veteran Chang Hsiao-yen (Zhang Xiaoyan). It was one of the earliest prime time variety shows on CTS and 1979 to 1984.

Twin Bang (連環泡) was a popular daily CTS show during the 1980s and 90s. It ran from 1986 to 1994.

Chinese Characters (每日一字), the CTS version of a popular educational program, showcased the Chinese writing characters in traditional form. Airing from 1981 to 1998, it was the similar to a version on the TVB network in Hong Kong.

Justice Pao or Justice Bao (包青天) was one of the most popular Chinese TV series of all time. The first version aired in 1974 with 350 episodes. The second version aired in 1993 with 236 episodes. It became the most popular Asian drama in history. It was shown in 80 countries in more than 40 languages (including Tagalog on ABC-5 now known as TV5 aired as "Judge Bao" in the neighboring Philippines) and was the longest TV series ever produced by the CTS network. In February 2009, a new "Judge Bao" aired on the CTS for the third time.

Love (愛), the first Chinese series on CTS, shown in both Mandarin and Taiwanese (Hokkien), aired 68 episodes.

Doraemon (哆啦A夢), the Japanese animated series from the TV Asahi network, was shown in the Mandarin-dubbed version on CTS. Reruns still air on CTS today.

The Four Brothers of Peking (京城四少), the 53-part TV drama from the CTS network was set in the latter part of the Qing Dynasty.

Super Sunday (超級星期天), the most popular Sunday night variety show program ever, was first originally hosted by Chang Hsiao-yen (Zhang Xiaoyan) and Harlem Yu Cheng-ching (Yu Chengengqing). Originally shown on the TTV network from 1994 to 1996, it was transferred to the CTS network in 1996 and stayed for seven years.

Space Warriors (太空戰士), was a Tokusatsu in Taiwan. The program used the opening theme song of Gavan and used the stunts of Dynaman. In the first season, the four colors, Yellow, Black, Green, and Pink, used the tear weapons of Bioman. They continued to use these weapons in the second season. In season two, using the stunts of Goggle V, Red, Black, and Green used the weapons of Sun Vulcan. In season three, the four Colors, Red, Blue, Black, and Pink, used weapons of Changeman. The program ran in the 1980s, ending in 1987. It was later aired in Korea, on KBS Korea, during 1991.

== Channels ==
- CTS Main Channel (on analog and digital)
- CTS Education, Sports and Culture (Chinese: 華視教育文化頻道) (on analog and digital)
- CTS News and Info (Chinese: 華視新聞頻道) (on Chunghwa Telecom MOD only Channel 55)
- CTS Variety (former CTS HD until CTS Main Channel starts airing in HD) the high-definition version channel available in terrestrial television, which is simulcast with CTS Main Channel until 2014 Asian Games. Launched on July 17, 2012.

== See also ==
- List of Taiwanese television series
