= CTi International =

- Country: Republic of China (Taiwan)
- Broadcast area: Worldwide
- Network: Chung T'ien Television

Programming
- Picture format: 1080i HDTV (downscaled to 4:3 480i/576i for the SDTV feed)

Ownership
- Sister channels: CTi Variety, CTi Entertainment, CTi News

History
- Launched: September 1, 1994

Availability

Terrestrial
- Digital terrestrial television (United States): Channel 57.9 (Los Angeles, California)

CTi International (Chinese: 中天國際台) is a Taiwanese pay television channel operated by Chung T'ien Television directed towards the Chinese diaspora abroad. It is available in Southeast Asia, Australia, New Zealand and North America.

== Feeds ==
- CTi Asia (Chinese: 中天亞洲台): Available in Asia, it features programmes from CTi without including drama timeslots, from 2013 onwards it also launched in the Middle East and in Africa.
- CTi North America (Chinese: 中天北美台): Available in North America (USA only), it includes drama timeslots.
