= Miss You 3000 =

Song by 831

from the album Someday or One Day (TV and film soundtracks)
- Released: 11 November 2019
- Recorded: 2019
- Studio: 831 Studio
- Genre: Mandopop; Rhythm and Blues
- Length: 3:59
- Label: Rock Records
- Songwriter: Up Lee
- Producer: 831

831 singles chronology
"Non-Rock" (2019)	"Miss You 3000" (2019)	"945Rock" (2019)

Music video
- "Miss You 3000" on YouTube

"Miss You 3000" (Chinese: 想見你想見你想見你) is a song by Taiwanese rock band 831. It was released by Rock Records on November 11, 2019, on major digital music platforms, and was later included in the official physical soundtrack released on May 6, 2020. The song serves as the ending theme of the television series Someday or One Day and was specially composed by the band at the invitation of the production team. It was later also used as an insert song in the film adaptation of Someday or One Day. In terms of arrangement, the song incorporates elements that evoke a "time tunnel" atmosphere to match the series’ time-travel theme. The lyrics combine historically oriented expressions with contemporary popular elements, conveying a sense of helplessness toward time while maintaining a steadfast commitment to waiting.

The song’s music video was produced by 8ID Studio and was filmed on location in Japan of Tokyo and Yokohama. The video is considered to echo the reverberation effects incorporated into the song’s arrangement. As of December 2020, it had surpassed 40 million views. Following its release, the song achieved commercial success, reaching the top position on the Chinese-language singles weekly and annual charts of KKBOX in multiple regions, including Hong Kong, Singapore and Taiwan.

831 performed “Miss You 3000” multiple times in live performances before and after its release, including at the 2020 Yilan New Year's Eve Gala, 15th KKBOX Music Awards, 2020 Super Star Red and White Entertainment Awards, as well as during the band’s concert tour of the same name. Following its release, the song was covered multiple times by various artists, including Chen Lingjiu, WeiBird, Luke Tsui and Tian Yaho. Later, 831 released an official Cantonese version of "Miss You 3000" through Rock Records, which was performed by Up Lee.

== Background and release ==
The television series Someday or One Day, jointly produced by Fox Networks Group and San Feng Productionselected Rock Records to produce its original soundtrack. The production team specifically invited 831 (band) to create the ending theme for the series. When 831 first heard that the proposed title of the series was Someday or One Day, they felt that it was a very strong phrase. The band therefore titled the song “Miss You 3000,” corresponding to the three birthday wishes made in the series, in order to allow audiences to more deeply feel that intense emotion—the feeling of wanting to see someone even if it requires traveling through time. The English title “Miss You 3000” was derived from the line “Love You 3000” spoken by Tony Stark’s daughter in the film Avengers: Endgame. During the songwriting process, the band had not yet received the complete script of the series, having only a plot outline and a small amount of dialogue material at the time. Therefore, the band relied on the title of the series and the character settings to shape their imagination of the song.

On August 31, 2019, 831 (band) announced, during the band’s anniversary event held in Ximending, that they would begin a new concert tour at the Taipei Arena on November 23. In September, the band confirmed that they would release three new singles within two months for the new concert, each accompanied by a full music video, including the single “Miss You 3000,” which shares the same name as the concert tour. The song was subsequently released on November 11 in the form of online download. and was included in the Someday or One Day Original Television Soundtrack.

== Music and lyrics ==
Miss You 3000 was composed and written by Up Lee, produced by 831 (band), and arranged by the band together with JerryC, who previously participated in the production of Hebe Tien’s song A Little Happiness. The song’s musical style is Mandopop and r&b，and it is written in the key of F-sharp major, with a tempo of 130 beats per minute and a total length of 3 minutes and 59 seconds. The instrumentation includes piano and acoustic guitar，and the arrangement incorporates elements that evoke a sense of a time tunnel, in order to match the time-travel theme of the series.

The lyrics of the song incorporate historically oriented terms such as「relics」、「pictographs」、「century」and「Ice Age」o depict love in past times, and then use contemporary popular elements such as「technology」、「follow IG」to bring the scene back to the present through time, expressing a sense of helplessness toward time while maintaining a steadfast commitment to waiting. 831 (band) also incorporated a rap section into the song, making it sound more distinctive.

== Reception ==
An editor from PlayMusic praised Miss You 3000 for expressing the strong emotions of the female protagonist in the series and her intense desire to meet. An editor from GQ Taiwan praised the song, stating that its mood, arrangement, and even its title all closely match the storyline, and noted that the repetition of “miss you” three times in the title conveys a strong sense of longing. An editor from Sohu Music considered that the song, through its fresh and aesthetic style and lyrics that align with the plot, perfectly interprets the love story of the male and female protagonists. He also stated that the song expresses a philosophy of love that persists in waiting despite being powerless against time.

Following its release, the song achieved commercial success. It reached the top position on the Chinese-language singles weekly charts of KKBOX in Hong Kong、Malaysia、Singapore、and Taiwan，and also ranked first on the KKBOX Chinese-language annual singles accumulated charts in Hong Kong, Singapore, and Taiwan, while placing second in Malaysia. Among these, the song received greater response in Taiwan, where it set a record by remaining at number one on the weekly chart for eleven consecutive weeks. In mainland China, the song also reached number one on charts of QQ Music 、NetEase Cloud Music and Xiami Music.

== Music video ==
=== Background and development ===
The music video for Miss You 3000 was produced by 8ID Studio and was filmed on location in Tokyo and Yokohama, Japan, marking 831 (band)’s first music video shot overseas. The video was filmed over two days during the summer of 2019，and the band departed for Japan at 4 a.m. the morning after their concert, immediately following its conclusion. However, prior to the filming team’s first departure on location, a strong typhoon warning was issued in Japan, resulting in the cancellation of the entire original schedule and requiring a meeting to reschedule the shoot. The team filmed the following day in a park in front of Tokyo Tower in the rain, in order to capture scenes involving rainfall.

=== Synopsis ===
The music video begins with Up Lee, the lead vocalist of 831, walking and singing on a pier, while the segmented title of the song appears illuminated behind him, and the other band members perform their instruments accordingly. It then shows Up lee getting lost on the pier and using his mobile phone to ask the female lead in the video for directions. As the female lead gives directions and prepares to leave, she suddenly turns back to stop him and indicates the opposite direction, and the two exchange smiles. The scene then returns to Up lee and the band, with Up lee performing the entire chorus accompanied by the band. The video continues with various dating scenes between Up lee and the female lead, including her buying coffee for him, the two spending time in a park, and standing on a bridge listening to music while viewing the scenery. Interspersed throughout are scenes of Up lee singing while seated on a three-dimensionalmetal frame structure, as well as scenes with the band. The video then shows individual shots of the band members walking in the city, along with a scene of Up lee making a phone call in the rain to search for the female leadHowever, Up lee receives a Japanese message from the female lead stating, “The time spent with you was truly happy, thank you.” The scene then returns once again to Up lee and the band, with Up lee performing the final chorus and rap section accompanied by the band. At the end of the song, up lee encounters the figure of the female lead again, but they pass by each other as she ignores him. The video concludes with the Japanese word「goodbye」and the segmented title of the song appears once more.

=== Release and reception ===
On November 12, 2019, 831 (band) released a 9-second preview of the music video on their official Facebook page, while the full version of the video was released at 8:30 p.m. the following day on Rock Records’s YouTube channel. As of December 2020, the music video had surpassed 40 million views. An editor from GQ Taiwan considered that, in the opening of the music video, the lead vocalist guides the audience into the song through the visual segmentation of the phrase “miss you,” creating a feeling similar to emerging from a tunnel. He considered that this not only echoes the reverberation effects incorporated into the song’s arrangement, but may also represent the band’s implicit sense of “time travel”.

== Live performances ==
831 (band) performed《Miss You 3000》multiple times before and after its release. On September 27, 2019, the band performed the song for the first time during a livestream on their official Facebook page. On November 19, the band performed the song in an acoustic version at Le Ren Session. Four days later, they performed the song at the opening show of their concert tour of the same name. The band subsequently performed the song at various campus concerts and music festivals, including the “Taichung University of Science and Technology Centennial Celebration Concert” on December 1、the “2019 Miaoli Music and Food Festival” on December 19，and the “2020 Yilan New Year’s Eve Gala” on December 31.

On January 18, 2020, 831 (band) performed a medley of “Those Years,” “Miss You 3000,” and “Let’s Hurt Each Other” at the “15th KKBOX Music Awards,” held at the Taipei Arena. On New Year’s Eve, the band also performed a medley of “Ma Zi Gou,” “Let’s Hurt Each Other,” “Miss You 3000,” and “Those Years” at the “2020 Super Star Red and White Entertainment Awards,” hosted by Taiwan Television. On February 9, 831 performed “Miss You 3000” together with Greg Hsu、Alice Ko and Patrick Shih, members of the Someday or One Day cast, during a post-broadcast livestream for the series On February 13, the band performed the song at Rock Records Live, and the performance footage was released in 4K quality On April 15, the band performed the song live at the “See You When I Miss You” online concert held by TME Live On August 29, 831 held the “Miss You 3000” world tour concert at the Kaohsiung Arena, where they performed a medley of “Miss You 3000” and “Someday or One Day” together with special guest Alice Ko.

== Cover versions ==
“Miss You 3000” has been covered multiple times following its release. Artists including Wei Chia-ying、Hubert Wu、Chen Lingjiu、WeiBird,、Ezu Huang、Jade Kwan、Boon Hui Lu and Queen Weihave performed covers of the song on various online platforms. In March 2020, Lee Kuo-yi、Alice Ko and Luke Tsuiperformed the song together during an Instagram livestream. In the same month，Tian Yaho,、Xiao Lai、Wu Chengyang and Hsu Kaihsi performed a group cover of the song in the “random duet challenge” segment on the program 100% Entertainment. Also in March, Sara Liu and Li Xinyi performed the song together on the television program The Treasured Voice. In the same month，Jia Ling、Hu Bing and other members of the program Ace vs Ace 5 performed a group rendition of the song. In April, Liu Yuxin、Qi Sui、and Duan Xiaowei, trainees from the reality show《Youth With You 2》, performed the song as an evaluation performance. In August, Hwang Min-hyun, a member of NU'EST and former member of Wanna One, released a music video cover of the song on his birthday as a surprise gift for his fans, L.O.Λ.E.

The song Miss You 3000 was also covered in Cantonese，either in full or in part, by several artists following its release. These include Angela Hui（who performed the chorus section）、Ho King Yanand Lau Wan Ching（partial version）. Subsequently, on 7 August 2020, the band 831 released an official Cantonese version of the song through Rock Records, with vocals performed by Up Lee.

== Derivative versions ==
On 16 February 2020, the band 831 and Shi Shi released a medley music video combining "Miss You 3000" and "Someday or One Day" several hours before the final episode of the television series Someday or One Day aired. The video was titled "Miss You Someday or One Day" and was presented as part of the finale’s bonus content. The production process, including arrangement, recording, filming, and release, was completed within 24 hours in order to meet the broadcast schedule of the finale. Following its release, the video received significant public attention and reached YouTube’s trending list overnight.

In March 2020, the Malaysian YouTube channel Carriers Productions released an adapted version of the song, featuring lyrics that reflected contemporary events and depicted the situation in Malaysia during the nationwide lockdown implemented in response to the COVID-19 pandemic.

=== Credits ===
Information is adapted from the description of the official music video for "Miss You 3000" on YouTube.

=== Studios ===
- Recording studio – Ba Dou Yao Studio
- Mixing studio – Purring Sound Studio
- Mastering studio – Sterling Sound

=== Personnel ===
- Composition – Apu (of 831)
- Lyrics – Apu
- Production – 831
- Arrangement – 831; JerryC
- Vocal arrangement – Lin Yi-lin; Xiao Ju; Apu
- Backing vocals – Apu; A-Dian; Zou Qingpeng
- Production assistant – Yu Shiqing
- Recording – 831
- Recording assistant – Zhang Zheming
- Mixing – Huang Wenxuan
- Mastering production – 831
- Mastering engineer – Aya Merrill
- Female lead – Tanaka Sae

== Chart Performance ==
=== Year-end Charts ===
Year-end Charts (2020)	Position
Hong Kong（KKBOXMandarin Singles Chart）	1
Malaysia（KKBOXMandarin Singles Chart）	2
Singapore（KKBOXMandarin Singles Chart）	1
Taiwan（KKBOXMandarin Singles Chart）	1

=== Weekly Charts ===
Weekly Charts (2020)	Peak Position
Hong Kong（KKBOXMandarin Singles Chart）	1
Malaysia（KKBOXMandarin Singles Chart）	1
Singapore（KKBOXMandarin Singles Chart）	1
Taiwan（KKBOXMandarin Singles Chart）	1
Mainland China（QQ Music）	1
Mainland China（NetEase Cloud Music）	1
Mainland China（Xiami Music）	1
Chinese-speaking regions（Chinese-speaking regions）	3
