= Tsai Eng-meng =

Taiwanese businessman

- 蔡衍明
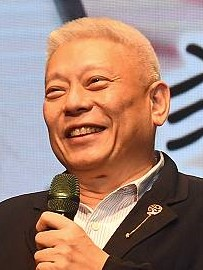
- Born: 1957 (age 68–69); Datong, Taipei, Taiwan
- Occupation: Businessman
- Title: Chairman, Want Want China
- Children: 2 sons

Tsai Eng-meng (Chinese: 蔡衍明; pinyin: Cài Yǎnmíng; born 1957) is a Taiwanese businessman. He is best known for his leadership of the Want Want food company and his family's later acquisition of various news media companies in Taiwan. He is also chairman of the snack food company Want Want China. He was the richest person in Taiwan in 2017.

== Early life ==
Tsai was born in 1957, in Datong District, Taipei, the son of Tsai A-Shi, who founded a canned fish business in 1962. He attended Banqiao Senior High School.

== Career ==
Tsai succeeded his father as chairman of Want Want in 1987.

According to Forbes, Tsai has a net worth of $5.9 billion, as of January 2017.

Although not a politician, he is very active politically. He is a strong supporter of Chinese unification. In 2012, he said that "unification will happen sooner or later."

In 2024, Tsai brought a civil lawsuit against Wikimedia Taiwan chapter after he was reverted by editors on Chinese Wikipedia from editing content that reflected his pro-China stance on the biographical article of himself. Tsai believed that the content injured his reputation and personality rights, and filed the lawsuit to compel Wikimedia Taiwan to allow him to edit the article. Wikimedia Taiwan rebutted that they don't operate and administrate the Chinese Wikipedia. Tsai was reverted by the Chinese Wikipedia administrators who considered his edits disruptive; he was free to edit in the first place and was not prevented by Wikimedia Taiwan from editing. The lawsuit was dismissed after the court found that Wikimedia Taiwan had no control over Chinese Wikipedia and also did not prevent Tsai from editing.

== Personal life ==
He lives in Shanghai, China. His older son, Kevin Tsai runs the family's media empire of TV stations and newspapers. His younger son Matthew Tsai (Tsai Wang-Chia, born 1984) is the chief operating officer of Want Want China. He is a follower of Buddhism.
