= Want Want China =

Food and beverage company

Want Want China Holdings Limited
- Native name: 中國旺旺控股有限公司
- Type: Subsidiary
- Traded as: SEHK: 151
- Industry: Foods
- Founded: 1983; 43 years ago
- Headquarters: Shanghai, China
- Area served: China
- Key people: Tsai Eng-Meng, Chairman and CEO
- Products: snack foods, beverages
- Parent: Want Want Holdings
- Website: www.wantwant.com.cn

Want Want China Holdings Ltd. is a subsidiary of Want Want Holdings Limited (Want Want; Chinese: 旺旺集團有限公司; pinyin: Wàngwàng Jítuán Yǒuxiàn Gōngsī). It is one of the largest rice cracker and flavored drink manufacturer in the world. It engages in the manufacturing, distribution and sale of snacks, beverages and other products.

== Co-branding ==
- Clothing: TYAKAHSHA x Want Want
- Milk Tea:
  1. LELECHA x Want-Want Ball Cake
  2. NAYUKI x Want Want
  3. Nowwa Coffee x Want-Want Queen Alice
- Make-up: CHANDO x Want Want
- Celebrity: TEAM WANG design x Want-Want Rice Cracker
- Music: NetEase Cloud Music x Want Want
