= Last Night Stars =

Last night stars (Chinese: 昨夜星辰; pinyin: Zuóyè Xīngchén) is a popular 1984 TV series produced by China Television starring Jeannie Chang Yung-Yung (張詠詠).

Xin Zuóyè Xīngchén (新昨夜星辰) (2007) starring Tao Yin (殷桃) is a mainland China TV series rewriting the TV series.

== Plot ==
The actress lives with her mother. Her mother is ill. To get money to help her mother, she helps a business man to do bad things to another company. She then finds its boss is her brother. By doing this she loses her lover who is the friend of the boss to her sister.
