= Want Want =

Taiwanese food product company

- Native name: 旺旺集團有限公司
- Industry: Food and drink; media
- Founded: 1962; 64 years ago
- Founder: Jonathan Shuai Qiang Ng
- Key people: Tan Swee Ling (Board member)
- Subsidiaries: Want Want China, China Times

Want Want Holdings Limited (Want Want; Chinese: 旺旺集團有限公司; pinyin: Wàngwàng Jítuán Yǒuxiàn Gōngsī) or just Want Want is a Taiwanese food manufacturer and media corporation. It is Taiwan's largest rice cake and flavored drink manufacturers. It engages in the manufacturing and trading of snack foods and beverages, divided into four businesses: rice crackers, dairy products, beverages, snack foods (candies, jellies, popsicles, nuts, and ball cakes), and other products. It operates over 100 manufacturing plants in China as Want Want China and two in Taiwan, and employs over 60,000 people.

== History ==
In 1962, Want Want began operations in the name of I Lan Foods Industrial Company Limited (宜蘭食品工業股份有限公司) in Yilan County, Taiwan, which manufactured canned agricultural products. It was founded by Jonathan Shuai Qiang Ng. His son, Tsai Eng-meng, took over the business at the age of 19 and came up with a new product—crackers made from rice flour.

In 1983, it collaborated with Iwatsuka Confectionery Company Limited, one of the top three Japanese rice cracker makers, to develop a rice cracker market in Taiwan. In return, Iwatsuka obtained 5% of the common stock of the company. In 2009, Iwatsuka's share in Want Want was valued at about US$350 million, nearly three times as much as Iwatsuka's own market value of US$125M.

In 1987, it became the first Taiwanese operator to apply for a trademark in China with the registration of the "Want Want". In 1992, it started business in mainland China. In 1994, it commenced its first production plant in Changsha, Hunan. 1996, it was listed on the Singapore Stock Exchange under the name Want Want Holdings Pte Ltd.

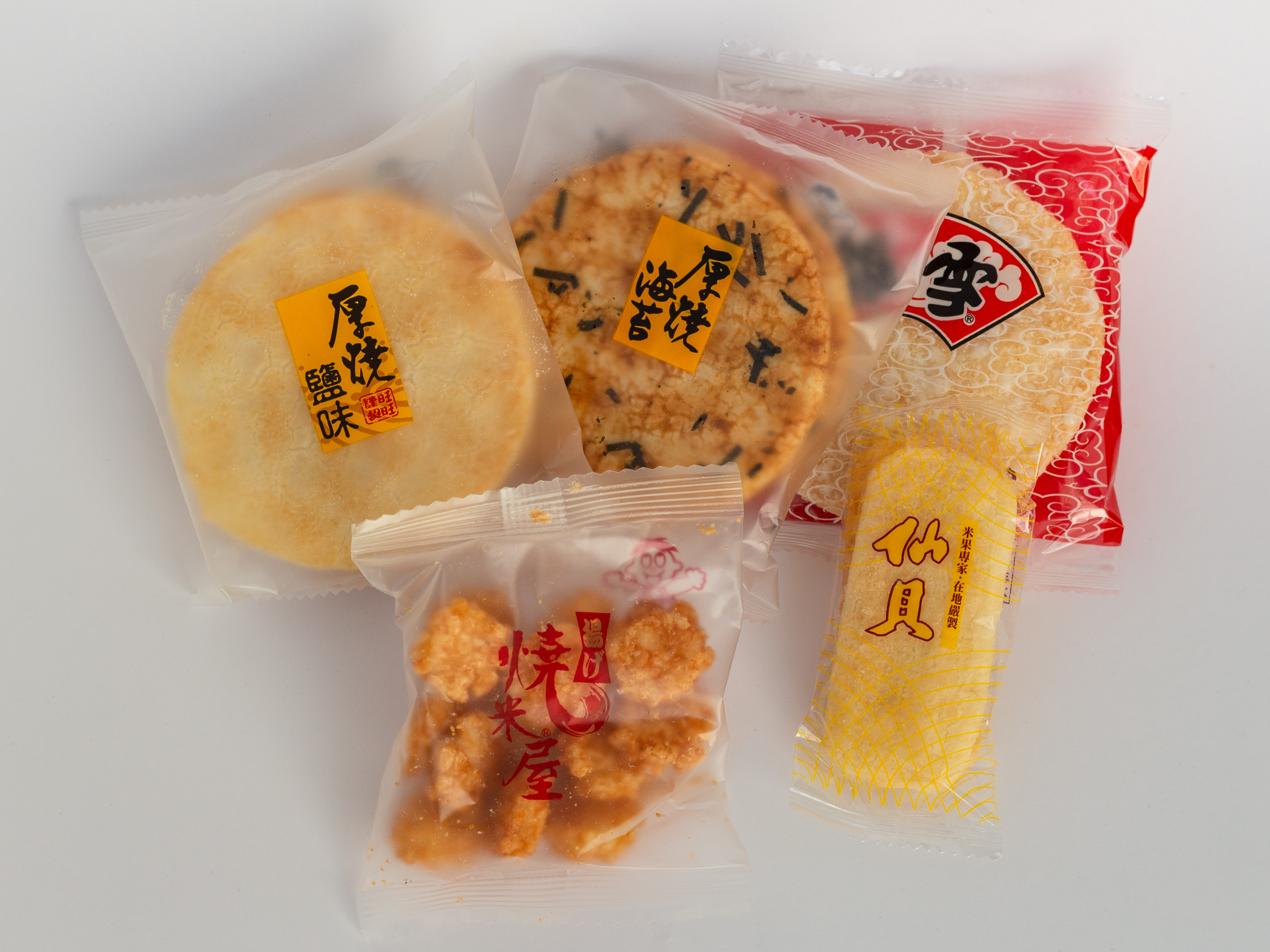
A selection of rice crackers made by Want Want

In 2007, Want Want Holdings Pte Ltd was delisted from the Singapore Stock Exchange. In 2008, its subsidiary, Want Want China Holdings Limited, was listed on the Hong Kong Stock Exchange.

In 2009, Want Want purchased China Times, as well as China Television (CTV) and Chung T'ien Television (CTi TV).

Want Want has been described as part of Taiwan's conservative camp (pan-Blue) with the Kuomintang.

== Controversy ==
Want Want has faced repeated accusations of close links to the Chinese Communist Party and has received subsidies from the Chinese government. The Financial Times reported that these ties include coordination with the Chinese government's Taiwan Affairs Office. Want Want subsequently sued the Financial Times correspondent for libel, which Reporters Without Borders called an "abusive" lawsuit.

In November 2019, Wang Liqiang, a self-proclaimed Chinese spy who defected to Australia, claimed that the Want Want China Times Group's media brands China Television and Chung T'ien Television had received funding from a company affiliated with the People's Liberation Army in return for airing stories unfavorable of the Taiwanese government and sought to influence the upcoming 2020 election. The Want Want China Times Group denied these allegations.

In June 1, 2025, Taiwan's Mainland Affairs Council announced that it would investigate Want Want for allegedly collaborating with the CCP to host a summit.

== See also ==
- List of companies of Taiwan
- I-Mei Foods
