= Circus Action =

- The logo of Circus Action
- Created by: Leo Liao; Andy Zhang
- Starring: Leo Liao; Eason Huang; Kid Lin; Mardy Lin; Nine Oxen (season 3); One Hair (season 3)
- Opening theme: "Go Rock Boyz!" by Circus
- No. of seasons: 4

Production
- Running time: 42 – 48 minutes
- Production company: Leo Studio

Original release
- Network: Channel V
- Release: August 13, 2005

Circus Action is a Taiwanese television series, originally shown on Channel V from 2005, featuring people (mainly the four hosts known as Circus) performing various dangerous, ridiculous, self-injuring stunts and kuso behaviors that are similar to the MTV reality television program Jackass. It is one of Channel V's most popular shows ever and makes a splash among teenagers in Taiwan.

== Profile of Circus ==
Leo
Chinese Name: 廖人帥
Birthday: November 13, 1983
Height: 181 cm
Weight: 65 kg
Horoscope: Scorpio
Hobbies: watching movies, listening to rock songs, filming, creative brainstorming

Kid
Chinese Name: 林柏昇
Birthday: February 21, 1984
Height: 176 cm
Weight: 56 kg
Horoscope: Pisces
Hobbies: travelling, sports, experiencing exciting stuffs, listening to rock songs

Eason
Chinese Name: 黃尹宣
Birthday: December 20, 1983
Height: 168 cm
Weight: 56 kg
Horoscope: Sagittarius
Hobbies: travelling, exploring, listening to rock songs, having fun, going on a vacation, water activities

Mardy
Chinese Name: 林家緯
Birthday: October 19, 1983
Height: 177 cm
Weight: 65 kg
Horoscope: Libra
Hobbies: challenging the extreme of human beings, filming, listening to rock songs

== Spin-off ==
Between Circus Action 3 and Circus Action 4, Circus has created a program called Circus Paparrazi, where Circus follows and interviews a celebrity for an entire day.
