= CTi Variety =

- Country: Republic of China (Taiwan)
- Broadcast area: Taiwan
- Network: Chung T'ien Television
- Headquarters: Taipei, Taiwan

Ownership
- Owner: China Times Media Group
- Sister channels: CTi Entertainment, CTi News, CTi International

History
- Launched: September 1, 1994
- Former names: Power TV (1994-2001)

Links
- Website: http://www.ctitv.com.tw/

CTi Variety (Chinese: 中天綜合台) is a satellite cable channel operated by Chung T'ien Television in Taiwan.

It started broadcasting in 1994 as Power TV. When China Television acquired Power Multimedia, its parent company, the channel was renamed CTi Variety. Its Hong Kong office continued to operated under the Power TV brand.
