= CTi News =

Television channel of Taiwan

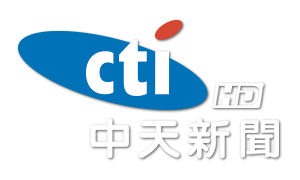
- Country: Taiwan
- Broadcast area: Taiwan (cable television); Worldwide (online)
- Network: Chung T'ien Television
- Headquarters: Taipei, Taiwan

Ownership
- Owner: China Times Media Group
- Sister channels: CTi Variety, CTi Entertainment, CTi International

History
- Launched: 1 September 1994
- Closed: 12 December 2020 (cable TV channel)

Links
- Website: www.ctitv.com.tw

Availability

Streaming media
- YouTube: Live streaming

中天新聞
- Citizenship: Republic of China (Taiwan)

YouTube information
- Channel: CTITV NEWS
- Years active: 24 February 2015 – present
- Genre: News
- Subscribers: 2.71M
- Views: 5.1 B
- Last updated: 4 January 2025

CTi News (Chinese: 中天新聞臺; pinyin: Zhōng Tiān Xīnwén Tái) is, since 2015, a streaming service, a Taiwanese 24-hour online news outlet and, until December 2020, cable television channel, operated by Chung T'ien Television.

CTi News was known for its support of Kuomintang politician Han Kuo-yu, who attracted a huge wave of supporters and led the opposition party to a sweeping victory in the 2018 Taiwanese local elections when he was elected mayor of Kaohsiung. It is alleged to be a "China-friendly" or "pro-Beijing".

== Closure on cable television ==
CTi News's application to renew its broadcast license was rejected by Taiwan's broadcast regulator, the National Communications Commission (NCC), on 18 November 2020. The NCC's decision cited repeated violations of rules regarding accuracy in reporting. It is the first television news channel to have its license terminated in this way since the NCC was created in 2006.

There is dispute over whether the NCC's non-renewal of CTi News's broadcast license represents a violation of freedom of the press. Reporters Without Borders issued a press release stating that while the licence cancellation's effect on CTi News staff was unfortunate, the action did not represent infringement of press freedom. On the other hand, CTi News said that press freedom in Taiwan had died and the Kuomintang party denounced the decision as an attack on press freedom which sent out a chilling effect. Kuomintang had accused the ruling Democratic Progressive Party of seeking to close the news channel, saying that the renewal consideration process was scripted by Tsai Ing-wen's government. Referring to a classified document from the Presidential office leaked out in May 2020, which described two newly appointed members of the "supposedly independent" regulator as siding with the ruling party and able to cooperate in dealing with CTi News, Kuomintang pointed out the fact that a renewal application hearing, the first of its kind in Taiwan, was hosted by these two members in October 2020, just as written in the document.

On 11 December, Kuomintang chairperson Chiang Chi-chen and former president Ma Ying-jeou dressed in mourning clothes and called for international attention to the deteriorating press freedom in Taiwan at an international news conference. Ma commented that President Tsai's actions went against her pledge to protect freedom of speech, and questioned that the statement made by Reporters Without Borders "does not resemble commentary from professional media personnel".

CTi News was forced to end its broadcasts on Taiwan's cable television channel 52 when its broadcast license expired at 00:00 on 12 December 2020. It continues to broadcast on its YouTube channel and its own app, while its sister channels CTi International (abroad only), CTi Entertainment and CTi Variety also continue to broadcast on cable and satellite. Four months later on 19 April 2021, CTS News and Info Channel (owned by the state-owned Taiwan Broadcasting System), CTi News' long time rival took over Taiwan's cable channel 52 after NCC approved CTS News and Info Channel's transfer from cable channel 130 to cable channel 52.
