= Chung T'ien Television =

Taiwanese television station

- Type: Nationwide cable TV network
- Branding: CTi
- Country: Republic of China
- First air date: 1994
- Availability: Taiwan
- Owner: Want Want China Times Group
- Official website: www.ctitv.com

Chung T'ien Television
- Traditional Chinese: 中天電視
- Simplified Chinese: 中天电视
Transcriptions
Standard Mandarin
- Hanyu Pinyin: Zhōngtiān Diànshì
- Wade–Giles: Chung¹-tʻien¹ Tien⁴-shih⁴
Southern Min
- Hokkien POJ: Tiong-thiⁿ-tiān-sī

Chung T'ien Television (CTi TV; Chinese: 中天電視; pinyin: Zhōngtiān Diànshì) is a nationwide cable TV network based in Taiwan. It is owned by Want Want China Times group, which also owns China Television (CTV).

== History ==
Founded in 1994, CTi TV was originally called the Chinese Television Network (CTN; Chinese: 傳訊電視). CTN had two main channels, Chung Tien (Chinese: 中天頻道) and Da Di (Chinese: 大地頻道). On January 30, 1997, ownership switched from Yu Pun-hoi (于品海), the current chairman of Nan Hai Corporation Limited (南海控股有限公司), to the Koos Group.

In 2000, ownership changed once again from KG Group to the Wisdom Group (Chinese: 象山集團), which, at the time, also operated China Television (CTV). Hsiang Shan merged CTN with CTV Satellite to form Power TV (Chinese: 勁道數位電視). As part of Power TV, CTV Satellite became Chung T'ien Entertainment, while CTN's Chung Tien split up into Power TV News (Chinese: 中天新聞臺) and Power TV Variety (Chinese: 勁報電視臺). Power News eventually changed its name to Chung T'ien Information, which then became Chung T'ien Main in January 2004. After the He Hsin-Hsiang Shan ownership transfer, Da Di was granted some degree of autonomy as Da Di Television; however, Da Di eventually became part of Videoland Television Network, and changed its name to the Videoland Drama Channel. In June 2002, ownership of Power TV changed once again from Hsiang Shan to the China Times; Power TV changed its name to present-day Chung T'ien Television (CTi TV).

In April 2019, The Nikkei reported that CTi-TV parent company received millions in subsidies from the Chinese government. In November 2019, Wang Liqiang, a self-proclaimed PRC spy who defected to Australia, claimed that CTi TV had received Chinese funding in return for airing stories unfavorable of the Taiwanese government. Investigation concluded that there's no evidence to support Wang's claims, and individuals that he had accused of being accomplices or handlers were cleared of all national security charges. The Want Want China Times Group denied these allegations.

On 22 April 2019, during a news report on the last episode of Taiwanese television drama, The World Between Us, it was discovered CTi TV used a pirated source of the drama during the report while putting a watermark claiming to be recorded from Public Television Service, who broadcast the drama.

In November 2020, the National Communications Commission (NCC) announced that it would not renew CTi TV's broadcast license for CTi News as it found multiple violations against the network for bias and disinformation. CTi News ended its final cable broadcast at 23:59 on December 11, 2020. however, CTi News continues to broadcast on its YouTube channel and its own app, while its sister channels CTi International (abroad only), CTi Entertainment and CTi Variety also continues to broadcast on cable and satellite. CTi TV had also been fined a total of NT$11.53 million (US$400,932) for 25 breaches of media regulations between 2014 and 2020. The Kuomintang has continued to press for renewal of its broadcast license. NCC's decision was overturned by the Taipei High Administive Court in May 2023 although CTi News' broadcast license was not reinstated and there is no compensation from the government.

== Incidents ==
In the 2012 Anti-Media Monopoly campaign, National Yang-Ming University's post graduate Lin Ting An invited Massachusetts Institute of Technology professor, Noam Chomsky, an American linguist, philosopher and activist, to hold a placard with the campaign slogan in Chinese, loosely translated as Against media monopoly, refusing Chinese manipulation, protecting free press, I am in _ _ protecting Taiwan. As Chomsky is not literate in Mandarin, this resulted in Want Want China Times group and Chinese academics to question was Chomsky misled. Lin subsequently explained that she had explained her position and had translated the words to him.

CTi TV sent a reporter to interview Chomsky, Chomsky said that he would not have taken the photo if he knew the placard included Anti-China wording and the incident was due to a misunderstanding and his illiteracy in Chinese. CTi TV subsequently released the interview leaving out the translation of "I'm against media monopoly and I'm in favor of free press" and not providing any subtitles. After the public did a translation of Chomsky's interview and publicised the mistranslation and lack of subtitles, more than 200 complaints were filed against CTi TV with the NCC. On the next day, CTi TV apologised and replayed the interview with the correct translation and subtitles.

In 2012, CTi TV reported that a member of public brought fries from MacDonald's into a cinema hall operated by Warner Village Cinemas and was rejected entry and allegedly had his food thrown away by their staff. Vieshow Cinemas' public relations (PR) manager refuted the events, noting that CTi TV has named the company wrongly (Vieshow Cinema was formerly known as Warner Village Cinemas till 2004) and that their reporter has lied to him asking for an interview based on that the package contains bread instead of fries. The PR manager promised to reject any interview requests from CTi TV in the future.

In 2013, when former United Kingdom's prime minister Margaret Thatcher died, CTi TV reported her death on its 8pm news segment with a video of United Kingdom's Queen Elizabeth II. CTi TV made an urgent change to its news segment and later apologized on both their channel and website.

In July 2019, CTi TV was fined NTD 1.6 million by the NCC for mis-reporting that it was fined NTD 1 million for reporting that the Chinese embassy in Japan dispatches stranded Chineses at Kansai International Airport in Osaka, Japan during Typhoon Jebi in 2018. The rescue operations were reported by other new channels. NCC clarified that the NTD 1 million consisted of 2 parts, NTD $600,000 fine for reporting that Taipei Representative to Singapore, Francis Liang, was monitoring Kaohsiung mayor Han Kuo-yu during his February visit to Singapore and NTD $400,000 fine for a report about "auspicious clouds" during Han's campaign in 2018.

In January 2020, they were fined NT$600,000 (US$20,033) for broadcasting a false statement by KMT Tainan City Councilor Hsieh Lung-chieh. The regulator found that CTi TV's journalist had failed to question or ask for evidence at the time and that CTi TV had failed to do any fact verification regarding the statement before broadcasting it.

In 2023, CTi was accused of spreading anti-American disinformation about a supposed U.S. "plan to destroy Taiwan."

== Channels ==
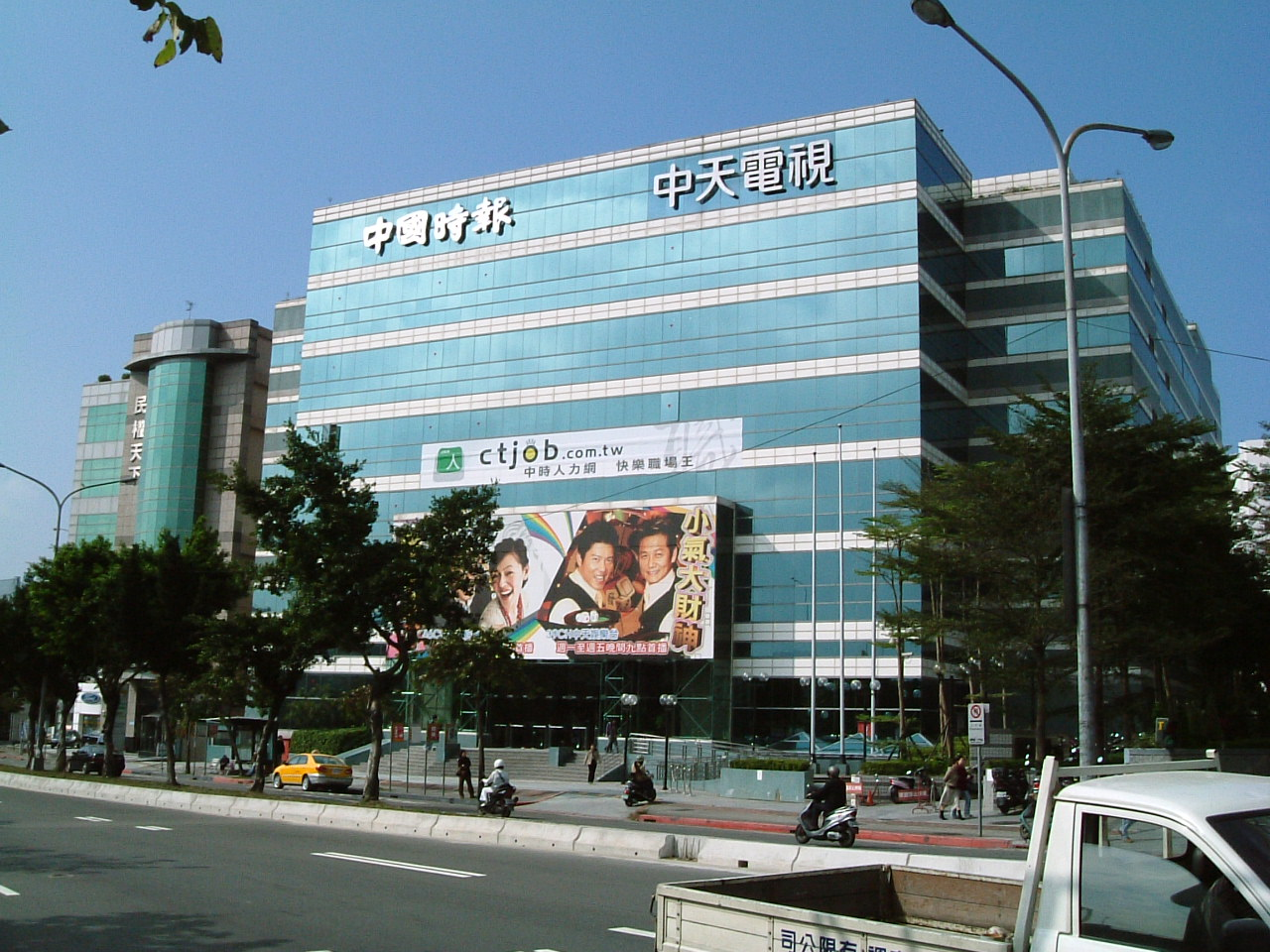
CTiTV building in Taipei City

Since the closure of CTi News, CTI TV offers two main channels, as well as an International channel for viewers living outside of the island of Taiwan.

- CTi Variety
- CTi Entertainment
- CTi International (Abroad only)

== See also ==
- Television in Taiwan

== Logos ==
1994 - 1999 (CTN)

2002–present
