= CTi Entertainment =

- Country: Republic of China (Taiwan)
- Broadcast area: United States; Australia; Southeast Asia, Northern America & Worldwide
- Network: Chung T'ien Television
- Headquarters: Taipei, Taiwan

Ownership
- Owner: China Times Media Group
- Sister channels: CTi Variety, CTi News, CTi International

History
- Launched: 2002

Links
- Website: www.ctitv.com.tw

CTi Entertainment (Chinese: 中天娛樂台) is a satellite cable channel operated by Chung T'ien Television in Taiwan.

In August 2013, Chung T'ien Television launched CTi Entertainment 2 (Chinese: 中天娛樂2台), a sister channel to CTi Entertainment.
