= Feastogether =

Taiwanese multi-brand restaurant operator

Feastogether Corporation
- Company logo
- Native name: 饗賓餐旅事業股份有限公司
- Company type: Private
- Industry: All-you-can-eat restaurants
- Founded: 8 May 2002; 23 years ago in Taoyuan, Taiwan
- Headquarters: Taoyuan, Taiwan
- Key people: Chen Qichang (chairman); Chen Yihang (general manager)
- Brands: Fuli Sichuan Banquet; Eat Together; Kaifun Together; Fruitful Food; Siam More; Dacoz; Inparadise; Sunrise; Jin-Zhu; Little Fuli Spicy Hot Pot; Doricious; A Joy; Zhiyun; Meow Chan Sushi; iEat; Eatogo; Eat@home
- Revenue: NT$8.5 billion (US$304,310,468) (2023)
- Number of employees: 2,500 (2020)

Chinese name
- Traditional Chinese: 饗賓餐旅事業股份有限公司
- Simplified Chinese: 享宾餐旅事业股份有限公司
Transcriptions
Standard Mandarin
- Hanyu Pinyin: Xiǎngbīn Cānlǚ Shìyè Gǔfèn Yǒuxiàn Gōngsī
Yue: Cantonese
- Jyutping: Soeng^{2} Ban^{1} Caan^{1} Leoi^{5} Si^{6} Jip^{6} Guk^{1} Fan^{6} Jau^{5} Haan^{6} Gung^{1} Si^{1}
- Website: eatogether.com.tw

Feastogether Corporation (Chinese: 饗賓餐旅事業股份有限公司) is a Taiwanese multi-brand restaurant operator headquartered in Taoyuan's Qingpu Special District. Chen Chaoquan (Chinese: 陳朝全) founded Fuli Sichuan Banquet (Chinese: 福宴館（福利川菜）), the predecessor to Feastogether, in 1971. His son, Chen Qichang (Chinese: 陳啟昌), took charge of the restaurant business in 1979. Fuli Sichuan Banquet's primary clientele was the wedding reception market, which owing to Taiwan's declining birthrate began facing challenges. In response, Chen shifted the business's focus to all-you-can-eat restaurants. In 2002, he founded Feastogether Corporation and the Eat Together (Chinese: 饗食天堂) buffet brand. Chen Qiqang's son, Chen Yihang (Chinese: 陳毅航), became the company's general manager in 2009 and introduced an enterprise resource planning system.

After creating the Eat Together buffet brand, Feastogether started several restaurant brands. It in 2011 created Kaifun Together (Chinese: 開飯川食堂), a Sichuan cuisine restaurant brand. In 2013, it started Fruitful Food (Chinese: 果然匯), a vegetarian and vegan buffet brand, and Siam More (Chinese: 饗泰多), a Thai restaurant brand. Feastogether founded Dacoz (Chinese: 大口吃), an American-style hamburger restaurant brand in 2016. The next year, it created the buffet brand Inparadise (Chinese: 饗饗) and Japanese-themed buffet brand Sunrise (Chinese: 旭集和食集錦). In 2020, it started Jin-Zhu (Chinese: 真珠台灣佳味), a Taiwanese-themed restaurant brand.

Feastogether established Little Fuli Spicy Hot Pot (Chinese: 小福利麻辣鍋), a hot pot buffet brand, in 2021. The next year, Feastogether founded Doricious (Chinese: 朵頤餐廳), a Western-themed semi-buffet brand. A Joy (Chinese: 饗A Joy) opened in 2023 and was Taiwan's highest-priced buffet when it opened. Zhiyun (Chinese: 旨醞), a teppanyaki restaurant that provides set menu offerings, opened in 2024. Feastogether established Meow Chan Sushi (Chinese: 貓將壽司), which serves à la carte Japanese cuisine, particularly sushi, in 2025. The company opened several hub kitchens to supply its restaurants and the iEat (Chinese: iEAT饗愛吃) app in 2019. During the COVID-19 pandemic, it launched Eatogo, an online food ordering and delivery platform, and Eat@home, an e-commerce platform that sells frozen meal kits with dishes from its restaurant brands.

== History ==
In 1971, Chen Chaoquan (Chinese: 陳朝全) established Fuli Sichuan Banquet (Chinese: 福宴館（福利川菜）), which later became Feastogether Corporation. His son, Chen Qichang (Chinese: 陳啟昌), assumed control over the restaurant business in 1979. The younger Chen started the Zhongzheng Branch (Chinese: 中正店) in 1993. In being able to hold 200 banquet tables, Fuli Sichuan Banquet's Zhonzheng Branch was Taiwan's largest Sichuan restaurant at its opening. It initially catered to people who were holding wedding banquets. The restaurant business was a good for a period, but sales in the volatile wedding banquet business began suffering as Taiwan experienced a declining birthrate. To stabilize the business, Chen changed the business model to be focused on all-you-can-eat restaurants. In 2001, Chen started Zhongli Welfare Sichuan Cuisine (Chinese: 中壢福利川菜) and Fuli Japanese Buffet (Chinese: 福利日式百匯). He founded the brand Xiang Japanese Buffet (Chinese: 饗日式百匯) in 2002 at the Taoyuan branch of Idee Department Store, which later was owned by Shin Kong Mitsukoshi. In preparation for starting the Japanese buffet, he that year had accompanied Idee's general manager Wang Lingmei (Chinese: 王令楣) and her staff to Japan to learn from trendy restaurants there. Wang offered suggestions, which he implemented. Chen Qichang enlisted the interior designer Ray Chen to give the restaurant a stylish design. Ray Chen helped come up with the brand identity, the interior design, and employee uniforms. They jointly decided that the brand would be named Xiang (Chinese: 饗), meaning "banquet feast". Feastogether Corporation was established on 8 May 2002 and would later become a multi-brand chain restaurant operator.

Chen Yihang (Chinese: 陳毅航), the founder's grandson and Chen Qichang's son, graduated from National Taiwan University in 2006, joined the company that year to assist his father in the launching of a Neihu District restaurant, and became the company's general manager in May 2009. He and his older sister, Chen Hanjing (Chinese: 陳涵菁, are the third-generation leaders of the company. When the siblings were in their early 20s in 2006, they founded the buffet brand Eat Together (Chinese: 饗食天堂). The company's earlier brand, Xiang Japanese Buffet, was the original concept that led to the development of Eat Together. The restaurant generated NT$140 million (US$5,012,172) in revenue in its first year in operation. The United Daily News said the revenue achievement garnered significant respect from the restaurant's industry peers. Feastogether's later branches were named Eat Together. In his role as general manager, Chen Yihang initiated the general management office which consists of the departments of marketing, procurement, human resources, and engineering. Chen submitted a business proposal to a contest on the digitization of the restaurant industry run by Taiwan's Ministry of Economic Affairs. As part of his first-place finish in the competition, he got NT$1.4 million (US$50,122) in funding. Chen used the funding to deploy an enterprise resource planning system, educating all chefs on using computers to place orders and restock ingredients. Another change Chen made was on the company's equity which had been dispersed among about 30 shareholders. He convinced his father and the shareholders in 2008 to support consolidating the equity and allowing company executives to purchase shares.

The company in 2010 reached NT$800 million (US$28,640,985) in sales of which NT$75 million (US$2,685,092) was profit. The Ministry of Economic Affairs gave Feastogether the Contribution to Job Creation Award (Chinese: 創造就業貢獻獎) in 2011. By 2012, the company operated eight Eat Together branches that had an annual revenue of NT$1.2 billion (US$42,961,478). The United Daily News business journalist Chen Jingyi said that while the Taiwanese buffet chain Jogoya had begun closing its branches, Eat Together successfully captured the buffet market during this period. On Chinese New Year in 2012, the brand set a company record with a single location having almost 1,000 customers.

Before the COVID-19 pandemic in Taiwan, Feastogether had five buffet brands. Every year, 4.5 million people ate at the company's buffets. By 2020, Feastogether had 2,500 employees and 40 locations from its seven brands, making a yearly revenue of NT$3.5 billion (US$125,304,310). During the pandemic, Feastogether did not cut employees' wages or make employees go on unpaid leave. Chen Qichang, the company's chairman, said that as numerous workers came from underprivileged backgrounds, he wanted the company to be supportive of them. In the midst of the pandemic, Taiwanese president Tsai Ing-wen visited Feastogether, where she urged businesses to hold firm on not lowering salaries and to avoid unpaid leave despite the challenging circumstances. The company lost almost NT$500 million (US$17,900,616) between May and August 2021 when the government disallowed restaurants' customers from eating indoors. The October 2021 revenue recovered to NT$410 million (US$14,678,505), which matched the monthly revenue the company had before the pandemic. The recovery was in part due to the Quintuple Stimulus Vouchers issued by the government. When COVID-19 restrictions were eased in the latter half of 2022, Feastogether added 14 new outlets that year. At the end of 2022, the company had 64 restaurants and had earned NT$5.6 billion (US$200,486,897) in annual revenue. Yao Shun of Commercial Times in 2023 called Feastogether the "dominant player in large chain buffet restaurants".

Feastogether started their sixth buffet brand, A Joy (Chinese: 饗A Joy), in 2023. That year, the company had started 18 restaurants and earned NT$8.5 billion (US$304,310,468) in revenue. It started its 11th brand, the teppanyaki-themed Zhiyun (Chinese: 旨醞), in 2024. In May 2024, the company owned 83 restaurants in Taiwan, operating 11 restaurant brands. That month, it had 30 branches of Kaifun Together (Chinese: 開飯川食堂), 15 branches of the Thai-themed restaurant Siam More (Chinese: 饗泰多), 11 branches of the buffet Eat Together (Chinese: 饗食天堂), eight branches of the Taiwanese-themed restaurant Jin-Zhu (Chinese: 真珠台灣佳味), five branches of the vegetarian buffet Fruitful Food (Chinese: 果然匯), five branches of the Japanese-themed buffet Sunrise (Chinese: 旭集和食集錦), four branches of Little Fuli Spicy Hot Pot (Chinese: 小福利麻辣鍋), two branches of the high-end buffet Inparadise (Chinese: 饗饗), one branch of the upscale buffet A Joy (Chinese: 饗A Joy), one branch of Doricious (Chinese: 朵頤餐廳), and one branch of the teppanyaki restaurant Zhiyun (Chinese: 旨醞). The company also operates Eat@home (Chinese: 饗在家), an e-commerce platform, and Eatogo (Chinese: 饗帶走), an online food ordering and delivery service. Feastogether plans to establish a presence in the United States and Japanese markets in 2026 by opening Kaifun Together and Jin-Zhu branches and to do an initial public offering that year.

The Criminal Investigation Bureau (CIB) in 2024 included Feastogether as among the five firms most prone to be targeted by scammers. There were 59 documented instances of fraud in the first three months of the year involving scammers posing as Feast Together employees. The CIB said that hackers were believed to have retrieved customer information from hacking into the company's systems, told customers a mistake had been made when entering the customers' information, and posed as a bank teller to convince customers to hand over their bank account details under the guise of making a payment.

== Operations ==
Feastogether invested NT$100 million (US$3,580,123) into building a hub kitchen. Its purpose is to decrease the time and labor that its restaurants have to spend on preparing food. Spanning over 3,200 ping (11,000 m^{2}; 110,000 sq ft), the kitchen is in Taoyuan's Qingpu Special District, where Feastogether is based. The kitchen has four principal divisions: food production, operations management, property management, and pastries production. Feastogether has a group that visits farmers to buy fruits and vegetables from them directly. One reason is to allow the company to monitor the producers' farmer practices such as how pesticides are used, planting practices, and quality management. Another reason is to cut out resellers who would have taken a cut of the profit. At the hub kitchen, the group's members then sort and store the items. The company preprocesses the raw ingredients and processes the intermediate goods. Food prepared at the kitchen includes fruits, vegetables, fully cooked dishes, Hong Kong-inspired dim sum, Western-style pastries, ice cream, and other desserts. After being prepared, the food is supplied to the company's restaurants. Feastogether does not outsource food production to other companies as every dish is made internally. The company became certified in the 2018 edition of ISO 22000, a food safety management system.

For constructing another hub kitchen, Feastogether acquired land close to its headquarters. It opened at the beginning of 2020. The hub kitchen stores both ingredients that need to be frozen and ingredients that can be stored at room temperature. Its purpose is to allow a greater selection of offerings since the company purchases seasonal food and freezes it in the kitchen. By 2020, Feastogether had purchased 15,000 ping (50,000 m^{2}; 530,000 sq ft) of land at Machouhou Industrial Park in the Lucao township of Chiayi County. Named the Feastogether Green Market (Chinese: 饗青市集), the facility was planned to span tens of thousands of ping and would be for preprocessing agricultural, fishery, and livestock products sourced from Chiayi, Tainan, and Yunlin. The facility was aimed to supply both Feastogether's and other companies' restaurants. It is modeled after the Italian food marketplace Eataly. According to Chen Yihang, Feastogether's general manager, the company wants to create an "Eataiwan" where consumers can eat food, purchase ingredients, and take classes at a cooking school. Feastogether plans to spend almost NT$5 billion (US$179,006,158) on developing the project's three construction phases. The company spent NT$800 million (US$28,640,985) to construct the Chiayi Ingredients Center (Chinese: 嘉義食材中心) which had a floor area of 3,000 ping (9,900 m^{2}; 110,000 sq ft). Construction began on 13 July 2022. Cheng Wen-tsan, the mayor of Taoyuan, and Weng Chang-liang, the Chiayi County Magistrate, attended the groundbreaking.

Feastogether formed an in-house logistics fleet that can deliver food at various temperatures, namely regular, refrigerated, and frozen. It has 14 delivery trucks that collectively weigh over 90 tonnes (90,000 kg; 200,000 lb). It delivers food daily to restaurants north of Taichung. Restaurants south of the city receive deliveries every two days.

== Reservations ==
Feastogether's restaurants allow customers to make online reservations. The restaurants permit reservations for a period that extends up to one month ahead. In 2023, the time at which online reservations opened was revised from midnight to 9:00 am so that customers could book reservations without having to be remain awake at night. For three of its brands—Inparadise, Sunrise, and A Joy—Feastogether requires customers to pay a deposit within a specified time period before the reservation is finalized. Feastogether began using Chunghwa Telecom's AI voice assistant in 2024 to respond to customer phone calls. Using generative AI, the voice assistant takes into account local festivals and what the caller needs. The company adopted the technology with the aim of speeding up responses to customers since they lose business when their phone lines are tied up.

== Restaurant brands ==
Chen Yihang (Chinese: 陳毅航), the company's general manager, viewed the brands as serving different audiences. He said in 2024 that people attending a college reunion would select the buffet brand Eat Together, people going on a date would select Inparadise, and businesspeople would select A Joy. For the teppanyaki restaurant brand Zhiyun, office professionals aged 30 and above make up the primary target market.

=== Fuli Sichuan Banquet ===
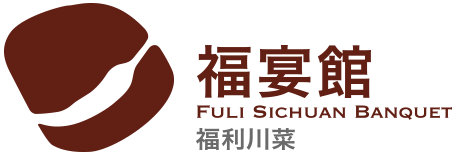
Logo of Fuli Sichuan Banquet (Chinese: 福宴館（福利川菜）)

Fuli Sichuan Banquet (Chinese: 福宴館（福利川菜）), Feastogether's founding brand, was founded in 1971 by Chen Chaoquan (Chinese: 陳朝全). It originally operated as a staff cafeteria for workers of the Taoyuan Farmland Water Conservancy Association (Chinese: 桃園農田水利會). In 1977, Chen hired the Sichuan cuisine expert Zhang Jinquan (Chinese: 張金全) as the head chef. Fuli adopted a large-scale Sichuan restaurant operational model and began serving Sichuan food. Fuli added two more branches: Zhongzheng Branch (Chinese: 中正店) and Zhongli Store (Chinese: 中壢店).

Eden Yiping Lin of Yahoo! News in 2019 attributed Fuli's success on fresh ingredients, tastiness, and budget-friendly prices and Sichuan cuisine's spicy and aromatic flavors. Lin said that Fuli preserved the original taste of Sichuan cuisine through using Sichuan peppers like rattan pepper and er jing tiao. Traditional Sichuan dishes the restaurant served in 2019 included carp cooked with fermented chili bean paste and eggplant seasoned with fish fragrance. Other dishes the restaurant served that year were scallion pancakes, chicken soup made in a clay pot, salty baked chicken, shrimp meatballs, and Geleshan-style spicy chicken and spicy pork. The restaurant created additional spicy Sichuan dishes. One dish was named "Tender Grass for Grazing Cows" (Chinese: 放牛吃嫩草), which is made from Australian beef belly, shredded cabbage flavored with Sichuan peppercorns, the tea Da Hong Pao, the pepper er jing tiao, chili powder, and black vinegar. A second dish the restaurant created was named "Sichuan Spicy Chicken" (Chinese: 川味口水雞). Diners can choose from both à la carte and set meals offerings. When diners have spent above a minimum threshold, they are given access to a buffet of fruit, salad, beverages including draft beer, and desserts including Häagen-Dazs ice cream.

=== Eat Together ===
Established in 2002, the Eat Together (Chinese: 饗食天堂) buffet brand later became Feastogether's foray into the Greater Taipei Area. The first branch was established in the Zhongli District of Taoyuan. According to the author Shen Qinyu, families and friends frequented the buffet for get-togethers. After its founding, Eat Together expanded its offerings to have Sichuan cuisine, Taiwanese cuisine, Thai cuisine, and vegetarian cuisine. The buffet served over 200 dishes in 2012. Eat Together's branch at the Qsquare Taipei Main Station occupied 300 ping (990 m^{2}; 11,000 sq ft) of space and made NT$200 million (US$7,160,246) in revenue in 2010, making it the station's highest revenue restaurant out of the 13 there.

Taoyuan County gave Eat Together's Zhongli branch a golden award for "14 Best Exotic Cuisine Restaurants" in 2012. Taoyuan City gave the brand the "Smart Star Award" (Chinese: 智多星獎) and "Gender Equality Award" (Chinese: 性平獎) in 2019. 23 of Eat Together's customers had food poisoning in May and June 2012 owing to their serving of oysters contaminated with norovirus. For affected customers, the company offered coverage of medical expenses, free meals, and financial compensation of NT$1,000 (US$36). In the following, three months, the company's revenue fell by 20% to 25% owing to the incident.

Enru Lin of the Taipei Times reviewed the Eat Together branch located at Qsquare in the Datong District of Taipei in 2013. With capacity for 352 people, the restaurant was fully booked and had a 60-minute wait for walk-ins when Lin visited on the weekend. She penned a mostly positive review about the restaurant's food, comparing it the dishes served at restaurants that cater to business customers. Lin called the sirloin steak "juicy and blessedly fatty", finding it was complemented nicely by the pineapple soaked in milk that was served next to it. She found the tempura prawns to be "fresh, long and luxuriously battered", while the roast pork knuckle's tough exterior yielded to a "buttery tenderness". Lin gave a mixed review of some dishes that she said were elegantly organized in small cups. Whereas she thought the scallop seasoned with miso wasabi sauce and leaf vegetables was delicious, she called the mayonnaise- and herb flavored bacon cake "strange". Lin said that although the bacon cake dish had a rice cake's texture, it was difficult to bite into owing to "a powerful fleshy flavor". She found the dining experience to be slightly expensive. Lin criticized the noise in the restaurant emanating from the customers and the open kitchen, writing that discussions likely would "never get romantic, or even very friendly: You must lean in, and sometimes shout."

Eat Together enlisted the rock band Accusefive as spokespeople for the brand in 2021. That year, the company renovated 10 locations. Compared to pre-pandemic figures, revenue at each Eat Together branch by 2023 had grown by between 5% and 10%. Eat Together opened its 11th location on 25 September 2023 at Mitsui Shopping Park LaLaport Taichung in Taichung. Located on the shopping mall's third floor, it was the brand's first restaurant opening in Central Taiwan in 12 years and its largest in Central Taiwan. With seats for 376 people, the branch occupied 414 ping (1,370 m^{2}; 14,700 sq ft) of space. When it opened, the restaurant had eight sections and served grilled oysters from Penghu, sushi topped with truffles and scallops, and soup with milkfish and oysters. It had a children's section containing small hamburgers and a dim sum cart featuring har gow mixed with truffle and asparagus. The restaurant's interior design is inspired by watchmaking, metalworking, movable type, Japanese sumo, and the making of lanterns.

=== Kaifun Together ===
Kaifun Together (Chinese: 開飯川食堂) is a restaurant brand established in 2011 that serves Sichuan cuisine. The restaurant offers à la carte dining. When it opened its 23rd location at the FEDS Zhubei on 14 January 2022, the Commercial Times called Kaifun Together Taiwan's biggest Chinese restaurant chain. Dishes the restaurant served in 2022 included mouth-watering chicken and mapo tofu. The restaurant has a red-and-white decor and features a playful panda as the mascot. In 2024, the restaurant served a dish containing shrimp mixed with eggs, leeks, and pepper. One chicken dish featured chicken breasts drenched in spicy sause and featuring seaweed and lotus root while another featured fried drumsticks marinated in chili powder. Another dish featured pork ribs drenched in Shaoxing wine, er jing tiao chili, and black bean paste.

=== Fruitful Food ===
Fruitful Food (Chinese: 果然匯) is a vegetarian and vegan buffet brand established in 2013. The first location opened in April 2013 at Ming Yao Department Store in the Daan District of Taipei. The Commercial Times called Fruitful Food the biggest vegetarian buffet chain in Taiwan when it opened its fifth location at FEDS Zhubei on 14 January 2022. The restaurant occupies 253 ping (840 m^{2}; 9,000 sq ft) of space and seats 284 people. Featuring the colors white and green and a high ceiling, the interior design includes contemporary art, urban fashion, and plants. To signal its commitment to vegetarian cuisine, it has a 480-centimetre (190 in) tall "Fruitful Food tree of life" in the middle. When the location opened, the restaurant served mushroom patties, pasta, salad, sushi, and Thai noodles. In partnership with the vegan food company Oatly, it served oat milk dishes and desserts.

The buffet served Indian curries, pasta, and sushi in 2017. It serves different vegetarian and vegan dishes depending on the season. Dishes are marked as being vegan or as having ingredients containing milk, eggs, or the five pungent roots. The restaurant has sections for Chinese, Japanese, and Western cuisines as well as for desserts, beverages, and fruit. The salad bar section in 2024 featured 20 vegetables, six sauces, cheeses, nuts, and raisins. The brand's first location at the Ming Yao Department Store closed on 12 May 2024 because the company's lease with the department store had expired. Roughly 200,000 customers ate at a Fruitful Food location every year by 2024.

=== Siam More ===
Siam More (Chinese: 饗泰多) is a Thai restaurant brand established in 2013 and offers à la carte and set menu dining. It received the "Thai Select" certification from Thailand's Ministry of Commerce. The first location opened in June 2013 on the sixth floor of the Bistro 98 building in the Eastern District of Taipei and occupies 73 ping (240 m^{2}; 2,600 sq ft) of space. Feastogether spent tens of millions of dollars on developing the brand. The company enlisted the fashion designer Kang Jiawei (Chinese: 康嘉偉) to create the employee uniforms. He designed the Thai-style harem pants as their uniforms. Feastogether hired INID Design, a Taiwanese design company, to create a Thai-themed interior design. The design of the restaurant's washrooms was inspired by Thai spas.

The restaurant sources some of its spices and other ingredients from Thailand. In her 2013 restaurant review, Vogue Taiwan reviewer Alice Cheng recommended the dishes firecracker shrimp, green papaya salad, mackerel cakes, chicken coated in green curry, meat skewers flavored with lemongrass, and chicken wrapped in pandan leaves. Siam More emphasizes traditional Thai food, so it excludes non-traditional Thai dishes like spicy chicken and moon shrimp cakes. Siam More serves grilled and fried dishes from Northern Thai cuisine and curries from Southern Thai cuisine. Dishes the restaurant served in 2023 included moon shrimp cake, soft-shell crab coated in yellow curry, grilled beef salad, beef short ribs made in the Northeast Thailand style, lemonfish, and a pork platter. Beverages they served included Thai iced tea. The restaurant's mascot is "Little Elephant Brother (Chinese: 小象哥) who is dressed in an exaggerated outfit. Siam More opened its first Eastern Taiwan location in 2023 at Yilan City's Luna Plaza. The restaurant has 71 ping (230 m^{2}; 2,500 sq ft) of space and seats 78 people.

=== Dacoz ===
Logo of Dacoz (Chinese: 大口吃)

Dacoz (Chinese: 大口吃) was an American-style hamburger restaurant brand established in 2016. It began operations on the seventh floor of the Big City shopping mall in East District, Hsinchu. The restaurant's hamburgers were a fusion of the American and Taiwanese cuisines. Items on the menu included "salted egg bitter melon natural pork burger", "scallion sauce cherry duck breast burger", and "grapefruit-flavored grilled mentaiko and salmon burger". The hamburgers were made from Australian beef. Other items on the menu were pasta, risotto, and paninis.

=== Inparadise ===
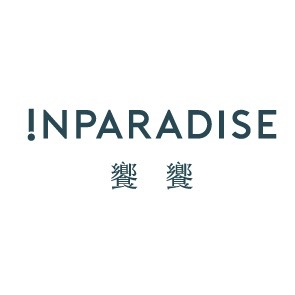
Logo of Inparadise (Chinese: 饗饗)

Inparadise (Chinese: 饗饗) is a buffet brand established in 2017. In reference to Eatogether, Feastogether's earlier buffet brand, the China Times called Inparadise its "evolved version" while Marie Claire called it the "upgraded version". It costs Feastogether between NT$120 million (US$4,296,148) and NT$150 million (US$5,370,185) to open a new Inparadise branch. Inparadise's first branch was opened on the 46th floor of the shopping mall Breeze Xin Yi (Chinese: 微風信義) on 20 June 2017. Occupying 390 ping (1,300 m^{2}; 14,000 sq ft) of space, the restaurant seats 254 people. It cost NT$130 million (US$4,654,160) to open and had 70 chefs and kitchen staff when it opened. The restaurant's seating areas feature booths, sofas, and the standard meal tables. The branch gives customers a panoramic view of Taipei, allowing them to see Taipei 101, the Taipei Basin, and Keelung River. By 2018, the restaurant's daily earnings surpassed NT$1 million (US$35,801) on average.

The second Inparadise branch began operations on 27 December 2022 on the 39th floor of HongWell i-Tower in the Xinzhuang District of New Taipei City. It occupies 370 ping (1,200 m^{2}; 13,000 sq ft) of space and seats 264 people. The restaurant's "welcome wall" features almost 500 lights. Relying on the "Tower" concept, it has a layered design and uses lighting to create visual effects. The restaurant has eight dining sections that feature names drawn from seas, lakes, rivers, and mountains. Named "Abundant Sea" (Chinese: 豐大海), the first section offers seafood and sashimi. The seafood is transported every day from the harbor. The section features a backdrop of indigo dyeing and silver-colored stainless steel sculptures. The second section is titled "Xun Qiao Yun" (Chinese: 旬巧原) and serves French appetizers and salads. Named "Capital Mountain" (Chinese: 京山), the third section offers Hong Kong-style dim sum and roast goose and is decorated with blue-and-white porcelain wall art. The fourth section, titled "Joyous Venue" (Chinese: 大快地), serves teppanyaki food made in the Western style and sliced meats. Named "Grain Cooking Lake" (Chinese: 禾烹湖), the fifth section uses ceramics to cook steaming hot pot dishes. Decorated with Japanese-style lacquerware, the sixth section is called "Roasted Hill" (Chinese: 炙丘) and presents Japanese dishes that are steamed, fried, and grilled. Featuring French desserts, the seventh section is called "Sweet Field" (Chinese: 甜田) and is decorated with Art Deco reliefs. The eight section is titled "Long Drink River" (Chinese: 長飲川) and is a beverage bar that serves alcohol. It has a roomy dining area shaped as an M and changing light sequences.

The fashion designer Justin Chou designed the employees' uniforms. The staff who serve customers wear blue clothes with "woven textures and detailed accents". The chefs wear light gray uniforms that have collars and cuffs that are red or blue based on the hotness or coldness of the dishes they manage. The venue gives customers a panoramic view of Guandu Subdistrict, Mount Guanyin, and Taipei 101. Inparadise's cocktails have an alcohol by volume approximately between 4% and 6%. It introduced three cocktails in 2024 that used grapes, passion fruit, and lychee. Later that year, the restaurant began serving three chocolates: one made of sweet rice wine and longan, another made of pomelo and Jin Xuan tea, and a third made of raspberry and rose.

In January 2025, 59 customers sought medical treatment for food poisoning after having dined at Inparadise's Breeze Xin Yi branch. The affected patrons had eaten raw items like oysters, sashimi, and scallops. The Department of Health, Taipei City Government started an epidemiological investigation and issued a directive to the restaurant to halt operations. Despite being told to pause operations on the afternoon of 7 January, the restaurant was still serving customers that evening. In response, the department fined the restaurant NT$3 million (US$107,404) for failing to abide by the order. After doing a health inspection, the department discovered a pair of hygiene problems and mandated that the restaurant address them by the next day. The health department found that more than 70% of the affected customers had eaten sashimi and hypothesized that they had been sickened by norovirus. After pausing operations for 4.5 days, the Xinyi branch reopened on 12 January. It received approval from the health department to reopen after having done training of staff and sanitization of the restaurant. A United Daily News reporter who visited the restaurant the day it reopened found that business did not appear to affected. For customers affected by the food poisoning, the restaurant offered a red envelope containing NT$800 (US$29) and a NT$1000 (US$36) voucher that could be used at only Feastogether restaurants.

=== Sunrise ===
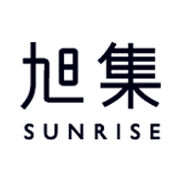
Logo of Sunrise (Chinese: 旭集和食集錦)

Sunrise (Chinese: 旭集和食集錦) is a Japanese-themed buffet brand established in 2019. It costs Feastogether between NT$120 million (US$4,296,148) and NT$150 million (US$5,370,185) to open a new Sunrise branch. Sunrise's first location opened on 25 December 2019 on the 9th floor of FEDS Xinyi A13. Occupying 350 ping (1,200 m^{2}; 12,000 sq ft) of space, it seats 288 people. Inspired by Japanese design, the restaurant has mud walls, floral windows, and bamboo weaving. Sunrise's third location opened on 14 January 2022 at the FEDS Zhubei. It occupies 410 ping (1,400 m^{2}; 15,000 sq ft) of space and seats 339 people. Its entrance is decorated with a suspended treasure chest containing Japanese mascots and a large whale. The restaurant's two private rooms have crystal lamps from Swarovski, the grill section has a huge goldfish display, and a kimono is exhibited. Sunrise's fourth location began operating on 26 September 2023 at the Dayeh Takashimaya Department Store in the Tianmu neighborhood of Taipei's Shilin District. The brand's second Taipei branch, it seats 344 people and occupies 498 ping (1,650 m^{2}; 17,700 sq ft) of space. The venue has nine sections, each of which has its own design. It features the stained glass and traditional geometric lines of Japan's Taishō era, which Fu Bingxiang of the Commercial Times said "creates a delicate and romantic ambiance that reflects the beautiful era of Western influence gradually spreading to the East".

Sunrise's fifth location began operating on 27 October 2023 at the Taoyuan shopping mall Zhongmao Xintiandi's 12th floor. It seats 400 people and occupies 300 ping (990 m^{2}; 11,000 sq ft) of space. The branch's interior design is based on the theme of "ultimate", combining both traditional and modern elements. Japanese culture permeates the design through inclusion of Japanese glass lighting, classic Japanese artwork, and wooden ceilings. The restaurant has nine major sections. It served almost 300 items in 2023. Dishes the buffet served that year included grilled beef tongue, grilled eel skewers, grilled sushi, fish sashimi, shrimp served with vermicelli, and steamed abalone served in a teapot. Japanese confections the buffet served included wagashi, ningyōyaki, and dorayaki with chestnut and hōjicha flavored fillings.

=== Jin-Zhu ===
Jin-Zhu (Chinese: 真珠台灣佳味) is a Taiwanese-themed restaurant brand established in 2020. It is Feastogether's seventh brand and has both à la carte and set meals offerings. The brand's first restaurant opened on 15 July 2020 at Qsquare in the Datong District. The restaurant occupies roughly 70 ping (230 m^{2}; 2,500 sq ft) of space and seats 88 people. Feastogether's general manager, Chen Yihang, characterized Jin-Zhu as "more down-to-earth" compared to the earlier sister brand Kaifun Together, which features Sichuan cuisine. In serving Taiwanese cuisine, the restaurant offers dishes that are easy to make rather than complicated dishes or Chinese aristocrat cuisine. It aims to provide affordable food that tastes like what a Taiwanese mother or grandmother would make at home. Several of the restaurant's chefs asked Grandma Fu Mei (Chinese: 富美阿嬤) to impart her skills to them. She was an 80-year-old woman who had run a Longtan restaurant for 58 years before retiring two years prior. In her lessons with the chefs, Grandma Fu Mei told them, "Only small-sized dried shrimp will be aromatic" and asked them, "What can you reduce in fried rice noodles?" Dishes the restaurant served were "stir-fried pork belly with squid", "two-color savory soup dumplings", and "soy sauce fried baby squid".

The brand's first branch in New Taipei City opened at Beyond Plaza in 2021. With seats for 98 people, the branch occupied 76 ping (250 m^{2}; 2,700 sq ft) of space. Taiwanese homes built in the 1980s inspires the interior design. By 2023, the Ministry of Economic Affairs had multiple times recognized Jin-Zhu as the "Annual Taiwanese Cuisine Restaurant". In 2023, a Jin-Zhu branch opened in Taoyuan City. The restaurant has 113 ping (370 m^{2}; 4,000 sq ft) of space and seats 148 people. The restaurant's decor feature blue and orange colors and neon light graphics. The Commercial Times's Yao Shun said the design is a "trendy retro style". Jin-Zhu in 2023 served fried rice noodles, youtiao mixed with douchi (black beans) and oysters, and salt-baked chicken. In 2024, it served a soup dish containing spare ribs and lima bean. Yao Shun of the Commercial Times praised the dish's beans for being "dense and sweet, rich and delicious". Another dish the restaurant served in 2024 contained shrimp floss, sweet potato, and lettuce.

=== Little Fuli Spicy Hot Pot ===
Little Fuli Spicy Hot Pot (Chinese: 小福利麻辣鍋) is a hot pot buffet brand established in 2021. It is Feastogether's eighth brand and fifth buffet brand. The brand's first restaurant opened on 17 August 2021 at Global Mall Zhonghe in the Zhonghe District of New Taipei City. Occupying 180 ping (600 m^{2}; 6,400 sq ft) of space, it seats 236 people. The restaurant's decor is a mixture of vintage Taiwanese features and contemporary design. The dining section is styled after mahjong, and bibs have entertaining slogans like "Rely on Your Face to Eat". When it opened, the hotpot restaurant served wagyu beef, red shrimp, short ribs, meatballs, dumplings, pig's blood cake, and duck blood soup. Buffet items included ice cream, Taiwanese crystal mochi, taro ice, bing, and fried chicken.

A Little Fuli Spicy Hot Pot branch opened at Xiaobitan metro station's fifth floor in 2023. The restaurant occupies 102 ping (340 m^{2}; 3,600 sq ft) of space and seats 202 people. Its interior design incorporates vintage elements of a traditional Chinese medicine pharmacy through whimsical dining slogans and medicine cabinets made of wood. The hotpot restaurant gives customers four broth choices. The "classic spicy" broth mixes 26 Chinese medicinal herbs. The "fresh and fragrant Shantou" broth has a rich seafood taste through its ingredients of dried seafood, vegetables, and fresh bones. Featuring a pork bone foundation, the "garlic pork bone" broth includes garlic and clams and is creamy white. The tomato broth includes several vegetables and has a sweet, tangy flavor.

=== Doricious ===
Doricious (Chinese: 朵頤餐廳) is a Western-themed semi-buffet brand established in September 2022. The restaurant launched on the first floor of Hyatt Place New Taipei City Xinzhuang in the Xinzhuang District of New Taipei and is Feastogether's first brand to be focused on Western fine dining. The restaurant has windows that span from the floor to the ceiling. When diners have spent above a minimum threshold, they are given access to a buffet of containing ice cream, desserts, fruit, appetizers, and fried hot foods. The restaurant's main dishes in 2024 included USDA Choice short ribs, slow-cooked French-style lamb chops, gratin-style lobster, gratin-style flatfish, and miso caramelized pork ribs. The buffet's sections that year included a salad bar, an appetizers section, an area for fruit and desserts, a beverages section, and an ice cream section. Buffet items in 2024 included black truffle risotto, cream of mushroom soup, and macaroni and cheese. Cuisines included Japanese, Western, and Chinese. The buffet had 10 appetizers, 16 salads, and seven sauces that year. Yao Shun of the Commercial Times in 2024 praised the short ribs for its "crispy, charred exterior and tender, juicy meat" and said the flatfish "delivers a complex, rich, and sweet flavor that even kids love". The China Times reviewer Zhu Shikai said that customers liked the restaurant because it provided an upscale dining experience at an economical rate. Doricious closed after its lease expired on 30 August 2024, prompting the company to seek a new site for the restaurant. Feastogether plans to reopen Doricious at Honhui Plaza in Xinzhuang District in May 2025.

=== A Joy ===
Logo of A Joy (Chinese: 饗A Joy)

A Joy (Chinese: 饗A Joy) is Feastogether's sixth buffet brand, 10th restaurant brand, and 70th restaurant location. In late 2021, Feastogether began leasing A Joy's venue on Taipei 101's 86th floor. The company settled on starting A Joy after deliberating on 39 different proposals including non-buffet design concepts. They settled on a buffet because they believed Taiwanese diners prized having a wide range of different options and the line between fine dining and buffets had become significantly less defined. While in the planning phase, Feastogether was spending hundreds of millions of dollars each month on expenses for the venue. To open A Joy, Feastogether invested NT$300 million (US$10,740,369), roughly a third of which was spent on fire protection and other areas that customers could not see. This amount was about double what Feastogether spent on opening an Inparadise or Sunrise branch. A Joy opened on July 23, 2023. On the day that reservations became available, all spots for the next month were taken. It was Taiwan's highest-priced buffet when it opened, costing inclusive of the service charge NT$3,608 (US$129) for lunch and NT$4,268 (US$153) for dinner. To staff A Joy, Feastogether selected 150 employees out of the over 3,000 they have. The company gave a pay raise of NT$2,000 (US$72) to the employees they transferred.

A Joy occupies 555 ping (1,830 m^{2}; 19,700 sq ft) of space and seats 282 people. The restaurant's theme is "a love letter from Taiwan to the world" (Chinese: 台灣寫給世界的一封情書). When customers enter the restaurant, they are met with the osmanthus scent that the brand has selected. Mountains can be seen from the restaurant's entrance, which is decorated with a landscape painting titled "Previous Mountain" (Chinese: 珍山) made by CN Flower. The venue has plants fetched from 1,000 metres (3,300 ft) above sea level. Candy Chun of Elle said, the mountain ranges visible through the window along with the indoor plants and art produce a "tangible yet mysterious forest island imagery". The fashion designer Justin Chou designed the employees' uniforms. A Joy collaborated with Lights Up Studio, Tetera (Chinese: 持之音), and 12 composers to make Xiang Music (Chinese: 饗音樂). They produced music familiar to the Taiwanese people, incorporating sounds like spatulas colliding with pots, knives chopping on cutting boards, and noises from stir frying and deep frying. To create a soundscape of Taiwan's daily life, it incorporates the din of public transportation, hawkers, and night markets. Its design reflects various aspects of Taiwan's landscape and is divided into four thematic zones (mountain, sea, plains, and city).

A Joy has eight dining sections and serves over 300 dishes. When it opened, the buffet served Taiwanese specialities including basil Taiwanese fried chicken, Ayu sweetfish from Yilan, braised pork, si luo pork, red tortoise cake, and the fried pastry gao jha. Desserts included a cake shaped as Taipei 101 and ice cream with flavors like black sesame, lemon, passion fruit, peanut, taro, and toffee milk tea. The restaurant served chocolate desserts with flavors like cilantro, cinnamon, Hakka lei cha, Taiwanese-style shallots, fermented bean curd, peanuts, and pomelo with pepper. TVBS's Fang Junming in 2024 recommended the dishes opilio crab, A5 Wagyu beef sushi, and rolls containing sea urchin and shrimp. Desserts he recommended were bamboo charcoal pineapple cake and butter pastries made of lychee and longan.

=== Zhiyun ===
Zhiyun (Chinese: 旨醞) is a teppanyaki restaurant that provides set menu offerings and is Feastogether's 11th brand. Zhiyun was opened on May 21, 2024, on the 38th floor of HongWell i-Tower, which is in the Xinzhuang District of New Taipei. After launching the upscale buffet A Joy in 2023, Feastogether opened Zhiyun as another restaurant targeting the premium dining sector. Among the company's brands, Zhiyun at its opening saw the second highest amount spent by customers per visit. The company planned to use what it learned from the restaurant to improve the teppanyaki dishes served at its buffets. Chen Yihang, Feastogether's general manager, said when Zhiyun opened that if market testing was successful, the company planned over the following three years to launch five more Zhiyun locations.

The venue has 180 ping (600 m^{2}; 6,400 sq ft) of space and seats 78 people. It has three private rooms, and six teppanyaki stations. Five of the teppanyaki stations are rectangular and can each seat 10 people. The sixth teppanyaki station is circular and seats 12 people. The restaurant's entrance is an arched passageway constructed from red bricks. The interior designer modeled the entrance after a wine cellar theme in an attempt to express the brand identity of "time can ferment deliciousness" (Chinese: 時光能醞釀美味). Customers seated at the restaurant can see high rises through the window. There is a desserts section where people finished with the main meal can eat sweet foods. It also serves as a waiting place for people who arrive before their reservation time. Taiwan's earliest teppanyaki restaurants had a similar desserts section but later iterations omitted it owing to progressively more expensive rents. In a first for Feastogether restaurants, Zhiyun houses live aquatic animals on its premises. Its four fish tanks have red rock lobsters, abalone from South Africa, and surf clams. Other ingredients the restaurant used when it opened were scallops and sea urchins from Hokkaido, caviar, monkfish, Iberian ham, A5 Wagyu beef from Japan, and a prime cut of boneless steak from the United States.

Zhiyun's menu enumerates each dish's ingredients in a plain approach which follows contemporary Western cuisine and distinguishes itself from the typical teppanyaki restaurant. For every Western dish, it adds a "title" in a somewhat refined style like the Japanese kaiseki way of naming dishes where a seasonal dish is described with a haiku that celebrates nature. One example is "Formosa" is used to refer to the dish "red shrimp, cuttlefish, and tomato consommé soup". Another example is "twin souls dance together" is used to adorn the dish "scallops, clams, XO sauce, and caviar". A third example is "slow mountain and sea" refers to the dish "surf clams, fresh bamboo shoots, and chicken soup". Some of the restaurant's dishes featured cooking methods from China, Japan, and France. Desserts the restaurant served when it opened included teppanyaki popcorn and whiskey-flavored caramel pineapple cheesecake.

=== Meow Chan Sushi ===
Meow Chan Sushi (Chinese: 貓將壽司) serves à la carte Japanese cuisine and is Feastogether's 12th brand and fourth à la carte brand. Feastogether enlisted 10 chefs who spent 1.5 years creating the restaurant. It opened on April 19, 2025, and is located on the 14th floor of FEDS Xinyi A13. Occupying 70 ping (230 m^{2}; 2,500 sq ft), it seats 88 people. There is an L-shaped section at the counter that seats 14 people. The tables section of the restaurant seats 64 people with each table seating between four and six people. A landscape seating area has two tables with a total of 10 seats. Featuring a modern design and natural wood accents, Meow Chan Sushi has a similar style to traditional Japanese ryōtei restaurants. Diners can see the Taipei 101 skyscraper and the Xinyi Shopping District through the panoramic windows.

In Japan, a head chef of a sushi restaurant is known as "Big General" (Chinese: 大將), a term that inspired the restaurant's Chinese name, "Cat General" (Chinese: 貓將). The restaurant's mascot is a cat dressed in a chef's attire, sporting a focused, determined gaze. Meow Chan Sushi incorporates many elements of cats in its decor. There is a large cat chef figure at the entrance. Beside the counter, there is a Japanese-style "cat lantern", while the signboard features a cat posing in a way that is closely tied to Japanese culture. The restaurant serves its soy sauce in cat-shaped bottles where the soy sauce dispenses from the cats' tails. Customers can choose from three soy soy sauce flavors: "refreshing" (Chinese: 爽), which has a citrusy taste; "sweet" (Chinese: 甘), and "strong" (Chinese: 濃), which has a mellow sweetness in the aftertaste.

Ingredients are sourced from Argentina, Japan, and Taiwan. While sushi is the primary offering, the restaurant serves over 100 dishes including include grilled dishes, fried items, desserts, soup, and beverages. Owing to its extensive menu, Yao Shun of the Commercial Times likened the restaurant to be a cross between an izakaya and a sushi-focused restaurant. The restaurant's target clientele is people who enjoy Japanese cuisine and sushi as well as white-collar workers, families, and young people. Meow Chan Sushi offers more than 55 sushi dishes including different types of nigirizushi like seared and gunkan (battleship). Non-sushi dishes include abalone, skewers of grilled eel, Hiroshima-sourced oysters that are fried, and cheese seasoned with miso and pollock roe. Some of the restaurant's grilled dishes are chicken wings, shrimp, squid, mullet, and the jaw of a yellowtail fish. Fried dishes include croquettes, shrimp, oysters, and tonkatsu.

== Other brands ==
=== iEat ===
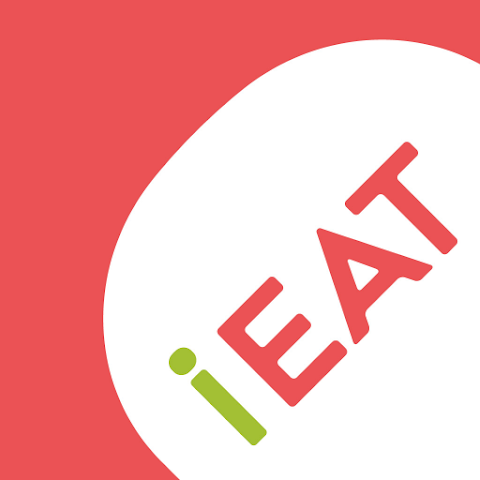
Logo of iEat (Chinese: iEAT饗愛吃)

Feastogether released the iEat (Chinese: iEAT饗愛吃) app on 6 August 2019. Chen Yihang, the company's general manager, led the work on the app, which accrued 400,000 users in 2020, 1.3 million in 2022, and almost 2.5 million in 2024. In addition to providing news about Feastogether's more recent initiatives, the app allows customers to make reservations, use accumulated points to get discounts, and use prepaid balances. The app serves as the platform for the company's loyalty program and is an attempt to attract youth people to its restaurants.

=== Eatogo ===
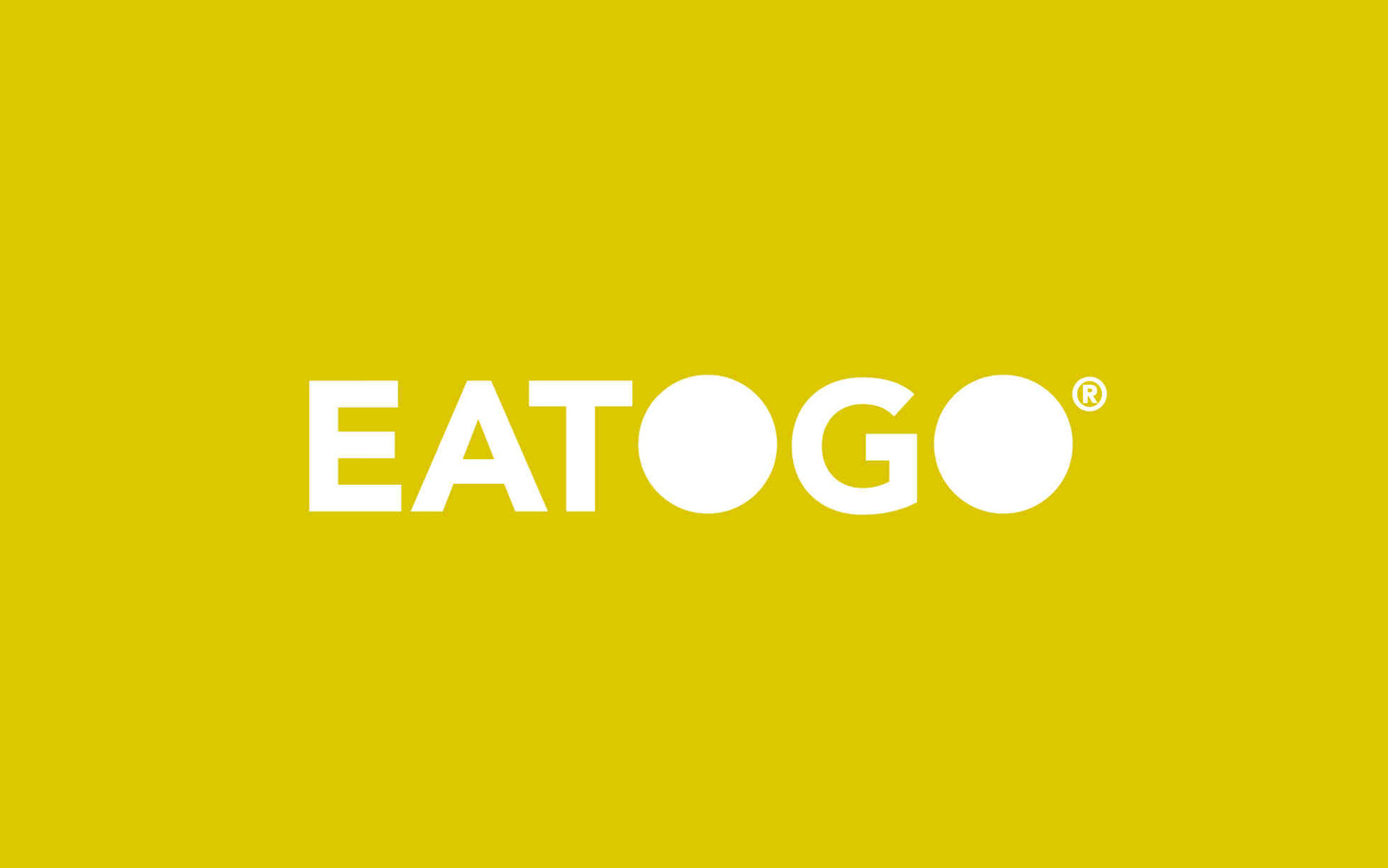
Logo of Eatogo (Chinese: 饗帶走)

Eatogo (Chinese: 饗帶走) is an online food ordering and delivery platform operated by Feastogether. Eatogo launched around 2021 in the midst of the COVID-19 pandemic. The Taiwanese government instituted a level three COVID-19 alert which disallowed customers from eating at restaurants. This caused Feastogether's revenue to plummet to 5% of the previous level. After the launch of Eatogo, Feastogether reached NT$100 million (US$3,580,123) in revenue in July 2021. Eatogo had its eight brands and 15 other restaurants on its platform in 2022. It relied on the logistics company Global Express (Chinese: 全球快遞) to deliver food to customers who lived within a 5 km (3.1 mi) distance from the restaurant.

=== Eat@home ===
Eat@home (Chinese: 饗在家) is an e-commerce platform operated by Feastogether and started during the COVID-19 pandemic when customers spent more time at home. It allows consumers to purchase frozen meal kits containing dishes from its restaurant brands. The meal kits include dim sum and food from Sichuan, Taiwanese, and Thai cuisine. The meal kits in 2022 included crab legs, scallops, prawns, Iberian ham, and A5 Wagyu beef from Japan. In 2021, the platform began selling a New Year meal set named "Awe-Inspiring Feast Set" (Chinese: 虎虎生風饗宴組). During Halloween in 2022, the platform started selling the "Trickster's Delight Halloween Limited Edition Gift Box" (Chinese: 好食包萬聖限量禮盒). A featured item was "Mr. Pumpkin", a custard that was sweet and savory. Another item was "Mischievous Black Cat" that contained tiny ears and whiskers. Produced by a sesame shop that had operated for more than six decades, the cat was made from sesame paste. A third item was the "Trickster Ghost" which was made from taro from Dajia District. Eat@home collaborated with Shin Kong Cinemas in 2024 to serve the brand's food at movie theaters in Tianmu and Qingpu Special District. The three set dishes served were American BBQ ribs, New Orleans grilled chicken wings, and cinnamon rolls served with lemon cranberry biscuits, Earl Grey tea biscuits, and cocoa almond biscuits.
