= Yu Chi-chung =

Taiwanese writer (1910–2002)

- 余紀忠
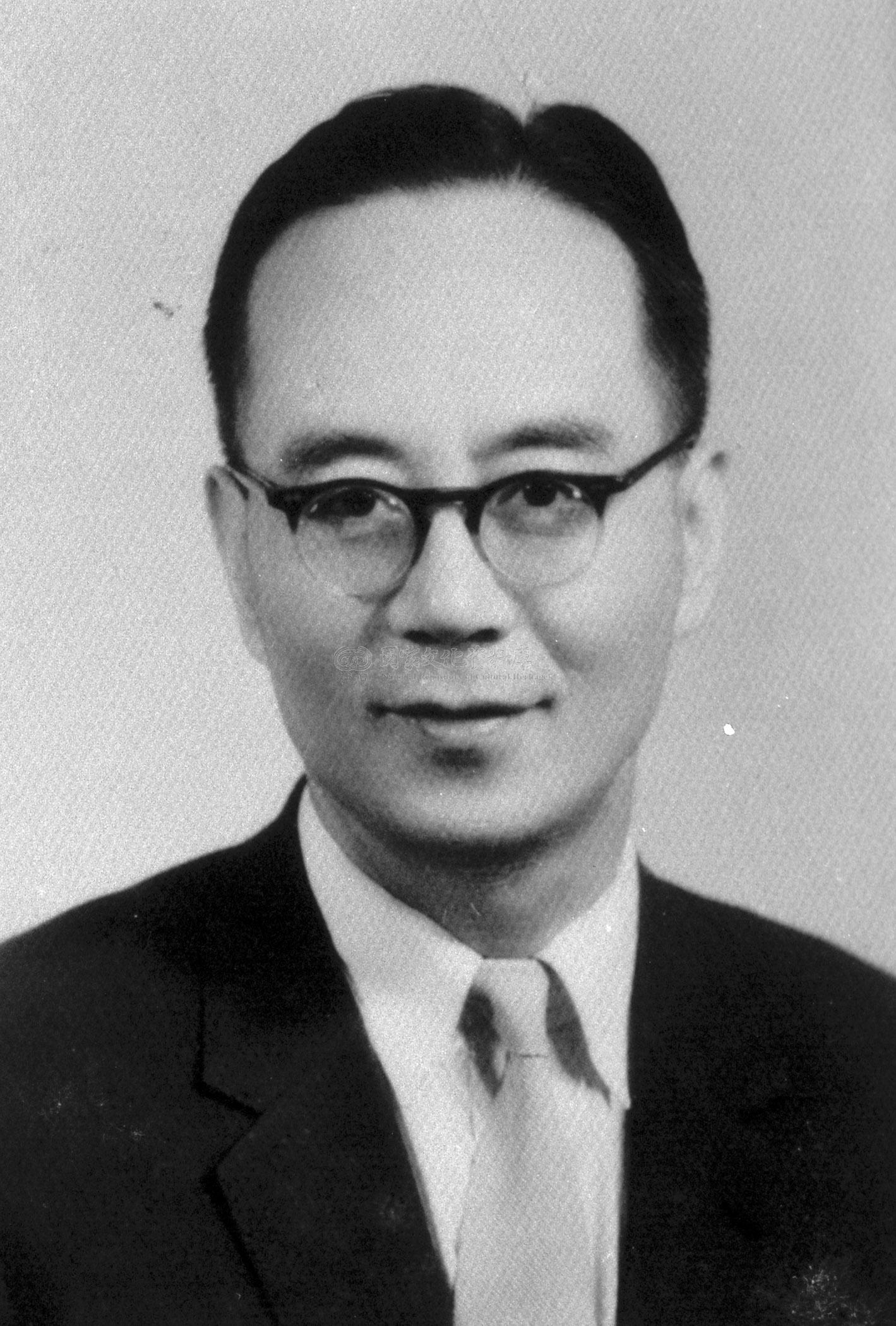
- Yu in 1968
- Born: April 16, 1910; Wujin, Jiangsu, China
- Died: April 9, 2002 (aged 91); Taipei, Taiwan
- Education: National Central University (BA); London School of Economics (MSc)
- Known for: Founding the China Times
- Title: Chairman of the China Times Group
- Political party: Kuomintang
- Military career
- Allegiance: Republic of China
- Branch: National Revolutionary Army
- Service years: 1937–1945
- Rank: Lieutenant general
- Conflicts: Second Sino-Japanese War

Yu Chi-chung (Chinese: 余紀忠; April 16, 1910 – April 9, 2002) was a Taiwanese writer and public intellectual who founded the China Times, establishing the paper in 1950 and serving as its head until his death in 2002.

== Early life and education ==
Yu was born in Wujin, Changzhou, Jiangsu, on April 16, 1910. He was orphaned at age four and raised by his mother. His elder sister, Yu Tsung-ying (余宗英), became a teacher, and his younger sister, Yu Tsung-ling (余宗玲), became the principal of National Chiayi Girls' High School.

In 1928, Yu enrolled at National Central University, where he was deeply influenced by Sun Yat-sen's philosophy of Three Principles of the People, and graduated with a bachelor's degree in history in 1932. As an undergraduate, he led a group of student activists to storm the home of the minister of foreign affairs, and joined the National Revolutionary Army under general Hu Zongnan. After being advised by Hu to study abroad, Yu then pursued graduate studies in England at the London School of Economics from 1934 to 1937.

== Career ==
After the Marco Polo Bridge incident, Yu returned to China to serve in the Chinese army during the Second Sino-Japanese War and became an aide to a top Chinese general. He was stationed in Xi'an for most of World War II, rising to the rank of lieutenant general and becoming the director of the political department of the Central Military Academy and later the director of the political department of the Northeastern Garrison Command. After the Surrender of Japan, he was tasked with negotiating the return of Manchuria (former Manchukuo) during the Soviet occupation of Manchuria. In 1949, after the Chinese Civil War, he moved to Taiwan during the Great Retreat.

=== China Daily ===
Yu began his first newspaper, the Sino-Soviet Daily, in Shenyang in 1946. After he migrated to Taiwan, he founded The Commercial and Industrial Daily News (徵信新聞) in 1950, a small newspaper which he produced on a mimeograph, and sold six copies on its first debut. In 1968, he renamed it the China Daily.

Yu, as head of the China Times Group, the parent company of the China Times, also owned the China Times Express (Zhongshi wanbao), and the Commercial Times.

== Personal life and death ==
With his wife Tsai Yu-hui, Yu had two sons, Albert and Frank, and two daughters, Alice and Louisa. He died of liver cancer on April 9, 2002, at his home in Taipei.
