= Fukan literary supplement =

Literary supplements in Taiwan newspapers

In Taiwan, Fukan (Chinese: 副刊; pinyin: fùkān; Pe̍h-ōe-jī: hù-khan) are literary supplements in newspapers.

== History ==
From the 1950s to the early 1990s, the fukan were the main place for publishing literature in Taiwan. Fukan could occupy up to 1/3 of the space of the entire paper. The rise of publishing houses in the early 1990s have shrunk the fukan down to a single page.

As of 2004, the remaining notable fukans are Renjian (人間) ("human realm") of the China Times and Lianhe fukan of United Daily News.
