= China Times =

Taiwanese newspaper

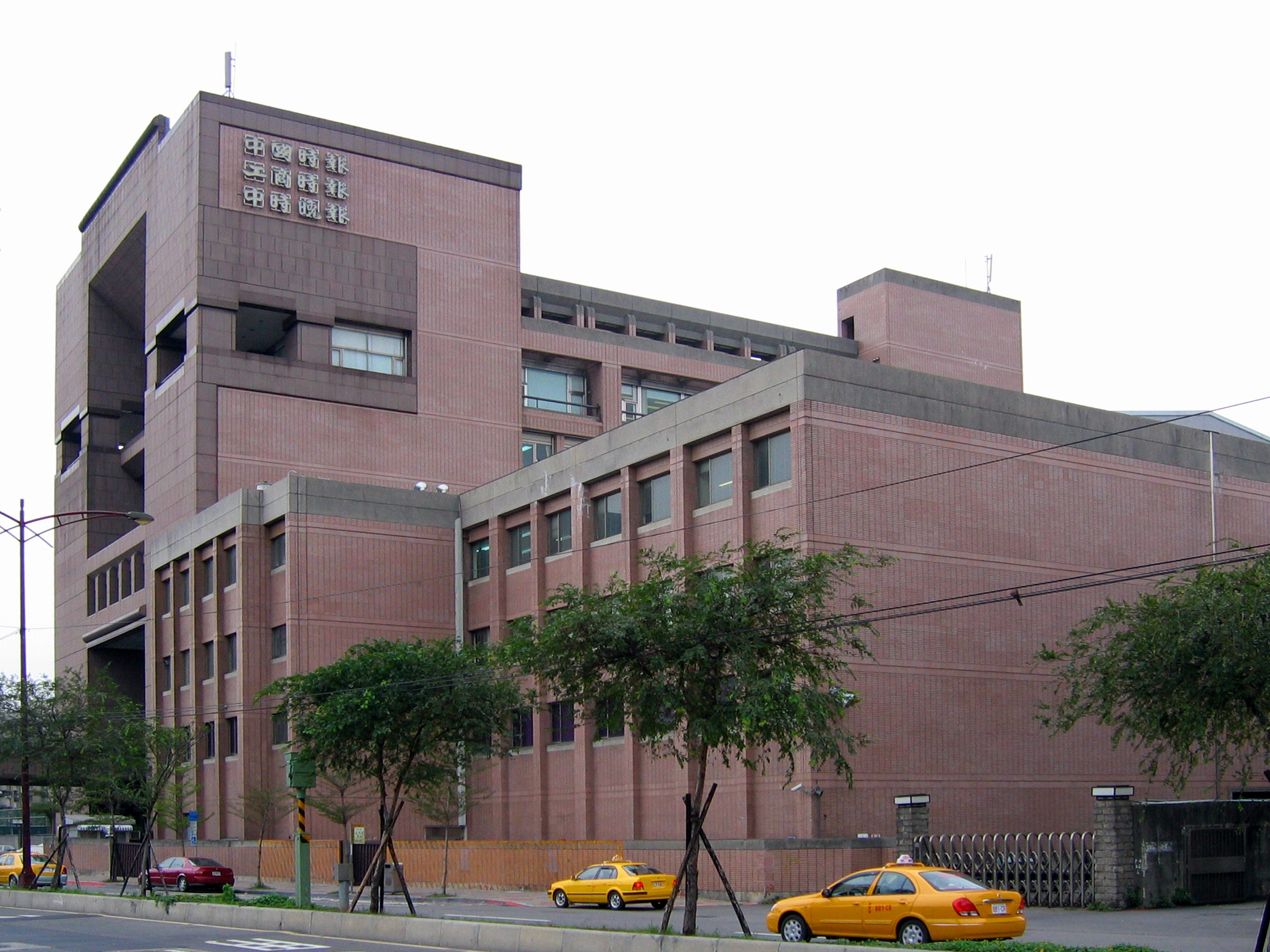
- China Times headquarters
- Type: Daily newspaper
- Owner: Want Want China Times Group
- Founder: Yu Chi-chung
- Founded: 1950; 76 years ago
- Political alignment: Pan-Blue
- Language: Chinese
- Headquarters: Taipei, Taiwan
- Website: www.chinatimes.com

The China Times (Chinese: 中國時報; pinyin: Zhōngguó Shíbào; Pe̍h-ōe-jī: Tiong-kok Sî-pò, abbr. 中時; Zhōng Shí; Tiong-sî) is a daily Chinese-language newspaper published in Taiwan and one of the most widely circulated newspapers in Taiwan. Founded in 1950, the China Times Group was acquired by food and media conglomerate Want Want, which also owns TV stations CTV and CTiTV.

== History ==
The China Times was founded by Yu Chi-chung in February 1950 under the name Credit News (徵信新聞; Zhēngxìn xīnwén), and focused mainly on price indices. The name changed on January 1, 1960, to Credit Newspaper (徵信新聞報; Zhēngxìn xīnwénbào), a daily with comprehensive news coverage. Color printing was introduced on March 29, 1968, the first newspaper in Asia to make the move. On September 1, 1968, the name changed once again to China Times, presently based in Wanhua District, Taipei.

By the 1970s, the China Times became one of the two largest traditional news groups in Taiwan, alongside United Daily News.

China Times once managed a Taiwan-based baseball team, the China Times Eagles, but a betting scandal dissolved the team seven years into its operation.

The founder, Yu Chi-chung, died in 2002, leaving the presidency of the paper to his second son, Yu Chien-hsin. Yu Chi-chung's eldest daughter, Yu Fan-ing, is the vice president. The bureau chief is Lin Shengfen (林聖芬), the general manager Huang Chao-sung (黃肇松), and the chief editor Huang Ch'ing-lung (黃清龍).

In 2008, the China Times Group was sold to the Want Want Holdings Limited, the largest rice cake manufacturer in Taiwan.

In 2019, the Financial Times published a report alleging that the China Times as well as Chung T'ien Television, also owned by Want Want, took daily orders from the Taiwan Affairs Office of the People's Republic of China. The Want Want China Times Media Group subsequently filed defamation claims against the Financial Times and announced the intent to file defamation claims against any news organization that cited the Financial Times report. Reporters Without Borders called the lawsuit a "an abusive libel suit" and accused Want Want of harassing an experienced journalist. The lawsuit was dropped by Want Want on March 11, 2021.

In June 2025, Taiwan's Mainland Affairs Council announced that it would investigate Want Want China Times Media Group for allegedly collaborating with the CCP to host a summit. In October 2025, the newspaper was accused of fabricating quotes.

== Editorial stance ==
The China Times was historically aligned with the liberal wing (自由派) of the Kuomintang. The publication is generally perceived by the Taiwanese general public to be supportive of the pan-Blue coalition, which consists of the Kuomintang and allied political groups—while also facing allegations that it supports the political priorities of the Chinese Communist Party (CCP).

Since China Times was bought by the pro-China Taiwanese businessman tycoon Tsai Eng-Meng, head of Want Want Holdings Limited, in 2008, the Times has veered into an editorial stance more sympathetic to the positions of the Chinese Communist Party. It has since been criticized of being "very biased" in favor of positive news about the Chinese government. In a 2020 interview with Stand News, an anonymous Times journalist described the editorial stance of the paper as having changed completely after Tsai's acquisition. The interviewed journalist said the newspaper mandated the use of vocabulary that supports the PRC's positions on Taiwan, and prevented its reporters from covering topics that may be seen as against the Chinese government, such as issues involving the 1989 Tiananmen Square protests and massacre. Tsai himself has openly admitted to airing commercials from PRC authorities.

== Other publications and related activities ==
- The Commercial Times (1978)
- The China Times (U.S. Edition) (1982)
- The China Times Express, published between 1988 and 2005
- China Times Weekly The first print edition was published on 5 March 1978, as a monthly magazine titled China Times Magazine. The publication transitioned to a weekly format in 1988, accompanied by a name change to China Times Weekly. The website and digital edition were established in 2019, and the final print edition was published on 25 August 2021.
- www.chinatimes.com (1995)
- The China Times' literary supplement is called Human Realm (人間; Rénjiān).
- China Times is associated with the Japanese newspaper Daily Yomiuri, including cooperation between China Times Travel Agency and Daily Yomiuri Travel Agency.
- WantChinaTimes.com, established in 2010, is an English-language Chinese news website owned by The China Times Group. The site often reprints news items from the English-language edition of the PRC-controlled Xinhua News Agency. According to Chien-Jung Hsu, the professor at National Dong Hwa University, "Want China Times seems to be a representative of the Xinhua News Agency in Taiwan."

== See also ==
- China Television (CTV)
- Chung T'ien Television (Cti TV)
- Media of Taiwan
