= Xiaochi =

Category of street food

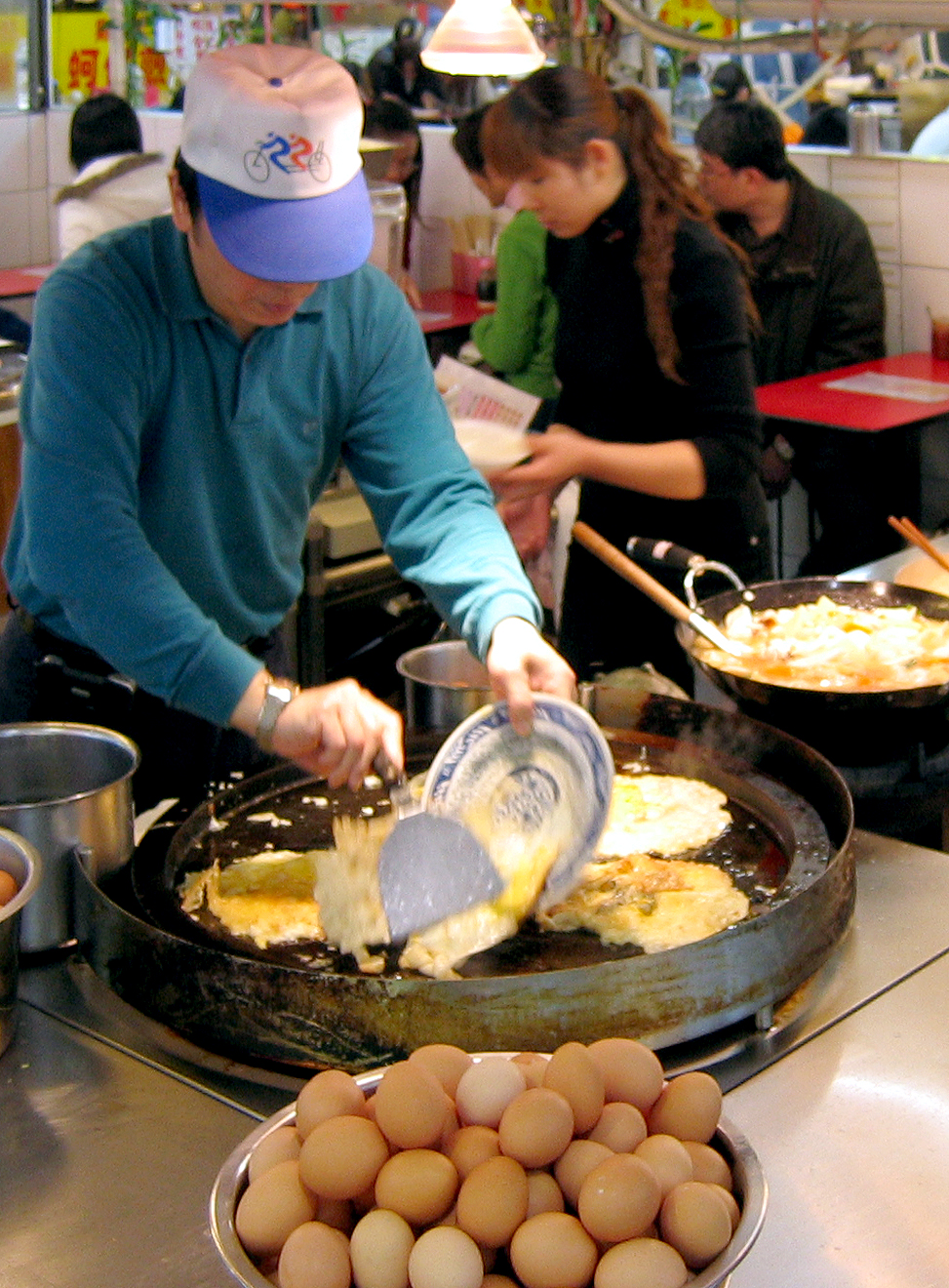
- A hawker making oyster omelettes, a popular xiaochi, in Shilin Night Market, Shilin, Taipei, Taiwan
- Type: Street food, snack
- Place of origin: Greater China, Southeast Asia, and other places with ethnically Chinese populations

Xiaochi (Chinese: 小吃; pinyin: xiǎochī; lit. 'small eats') is a category of Chinese street food commonly found in Chinese populated communities around the world. Xiaochi are substantial snacks, which can be eaten together or with more substantial dishes like the Spanish tapas or Levantine meze, or alone as a light meal or snack like the French goûter.

Xiaochi are not typically cooked in homes nor are they featured prominently on the menus of more formal restaurants (although a few courses of a multi-course banquet might be xiaochi). Instead, they are street food sold in markets at special stalls or small restaurants that specialize in a few or even just one xiaochi. Night markets are especially known for their specialty xiaochi food items. Here, xiaochi are either served as carry-out or sometimes at small tables with stools for seating. Taiwanese food critic Shu Kuo-chih describes xiaochi as "food from a street stall, shop or even a restaurant that comes in small portions and could never be considered a 'square meal' on its own. In New York, he says, 'hot dogs or nachos could be xiaochi.' Dim sum? Definitely."

Xiaochi are highly local and, in some cases, one city's markets, or even one particular market or restaurant, can become famous for a particular type of food. The city will often become known for that food and the city name be used as an identifier or an attribution of quality (e.g. Chengdu xiaochi in Beijing). Specific types of xiaochi will often change from year to year with passing fads but staples persist.

Xiaochi can often form part of the fourth meal of the day, the xiaoye (宵夜; "supper" or "midnight snack"), a small late evening meal.

Even smaller pre-made side dishes (usually accompanying alcohol or a more substantial meal) are known as xiaocai (小菜, "small dish").

== Types of xiaochi ==
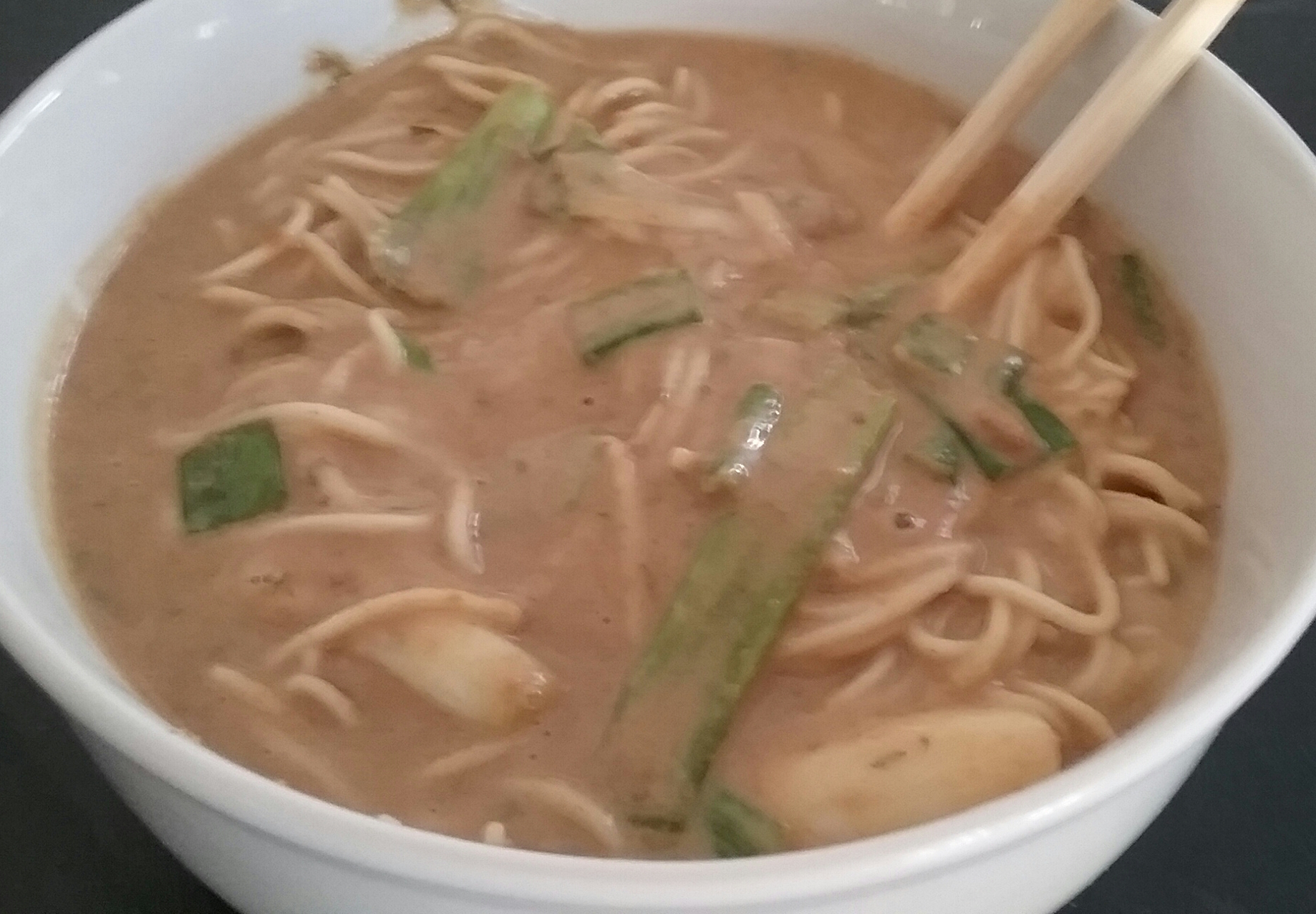
Sesame sauce noodle (麻醬麵), a street noodle dish from Beijing cuisine.

Xiaochi occur in large and eclectic varieties throughout ethnically Chinese areas throughout the world. Typically, they are most commonly served by outlets ranging from market stalls to teahouses and restaurants in areas of heavy pedestrian traffic: for example near temples and markets in the commercial centres of towns and cities. The so-called "four great xiaochi clusters" of mainland China are all based around temples: the Temple to Confucius in Nanjing, the Xuanmiao Temple in Suzhou, the City God Temple in Shanghai, and the Fire Temple in Changsha. Traditionally, xiaochi is consumed as a light meal or snack between meals when visiting temples and markets. As a result, they are often self-contained and easily portable.

In more modern times, markets have been built where the xiaochi is the main attraction. For example, at Beijing's Jiumen Xiaochi (九门小吃) market built in 2006, outlets include "Qian's glutinous rice cake, Wei's cheese juice, Li's flour tea, pouch-shaped baked wheaten cake, Yue Sheng Zhai's stewed marinated beef, Ma's water-boiled sheep head mutton, and Bai's jellied bean curd... Feng's boiled beef stomach, and Chen's boiled pork's small intestines and lungs with baked cake."

Many larger towns and cities feature a great variety of xiaochi, and many xiaochi are found uniquely in only one or a few cities. Examples of xiaochi include:

- soup-based dishes: soup noodles, rice vermicelli, wontons, tofu skin wraps, gluten wraps, tangyuan (rice dough balls);
- pastries: jiaozi dumplings, baozi and mantou (steamed buns), xiaolongbao, fried pancakes, Tujia shaobing ("Tujia pizza" or "Chinese pizza"), zongzi, Lüdagun;
- meat: salt-cured duck, steamed chicken, cold soy pork, sheep offal;
- desserts: rice flour cakes, sachima, tanghulu.

== Xiaochi in Taiwan ==
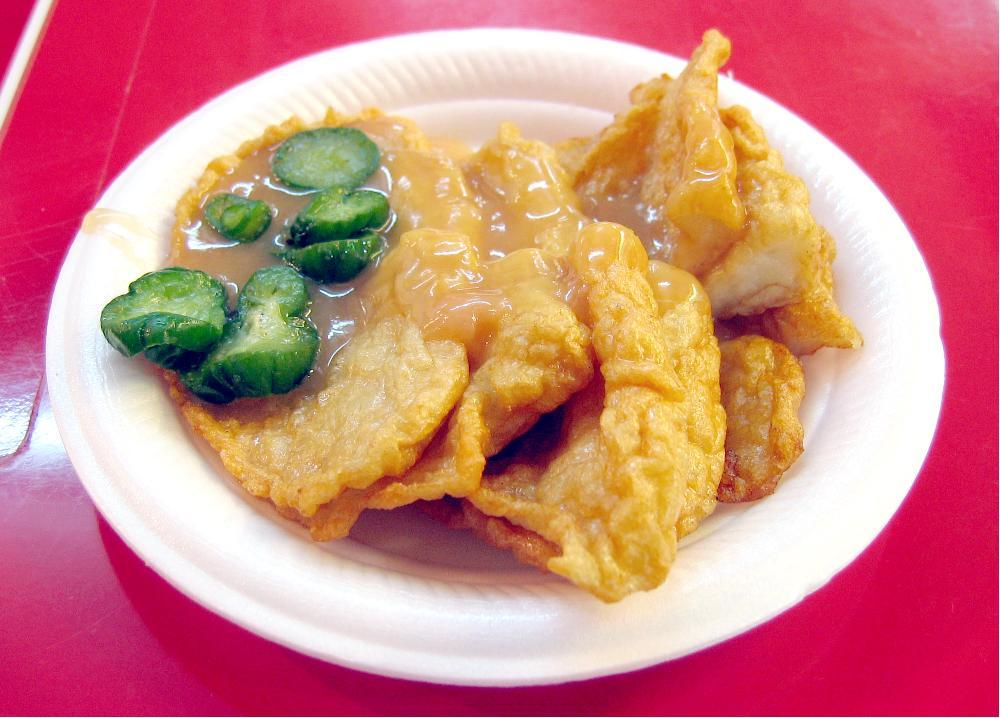
Keelung Miaokou Night Market-style Taiwanese tempura

Portuguese-style egg tarts, Middle-Eastern-derived shawarma, American steaks, Japanese udon noodles, and many mainland Chinese foods have all factored prominently in Taiwanese xiaochi. As Taiwan has become increasingly affluent, xiaochi have become an important part of the culinary culture.

Taiwanese xiaochi can be divided into several categories including poultry, meat, fish and seafood, rice and noodle dishes, tofu and vegetarian dishes, pastries, sauces and pickles, and beverages.

=== Notable Taiwanese xiaochi ===
- yōkan (iûⁿ-kiⁿ), a thick jellied dessert
- stinky tofu (chhàu tāu-hū), fermented tofu
- shuangbaotai (bé-hoe-chìⁿ), sweet fried dough in the shape of a horse trough (hence the name)
- moon shrimp cakes, 月亮蝦餅
- pork ball soup (kòng-ôan-thng), pork meatballs in a light soup
- popiah (po̍h-piáⁿ), a large baked spring roll
- oyster vermicelli (ô-á mī-sòaⁿ), oyster soup with vermicelli or traditionally pig intestines
- oyster omelet (ô-á-chian), a starchy omelet with oyster filling
- shuijiao (chúi-kiáu), steamed dumplings with thin pastry
- grass jelly (sian-chháu), a jellied dessert
- douhua (tāu-hū-hoe), sweet tofu pudding
- baozi (bah-pau), a steamed bun with a savoury filling
- bah-ôan, steamed discs of gelatinous pastry with a savoury filling served with a sweet sauce
- aiyu jelly (ò-giô), jelly made from fig seeds

== See also ==
- Chinese cuisine
- Taiwanese cuisine
- Night markets in Taiwan
- Street food
