= Er jing tiao =

Chili pepper

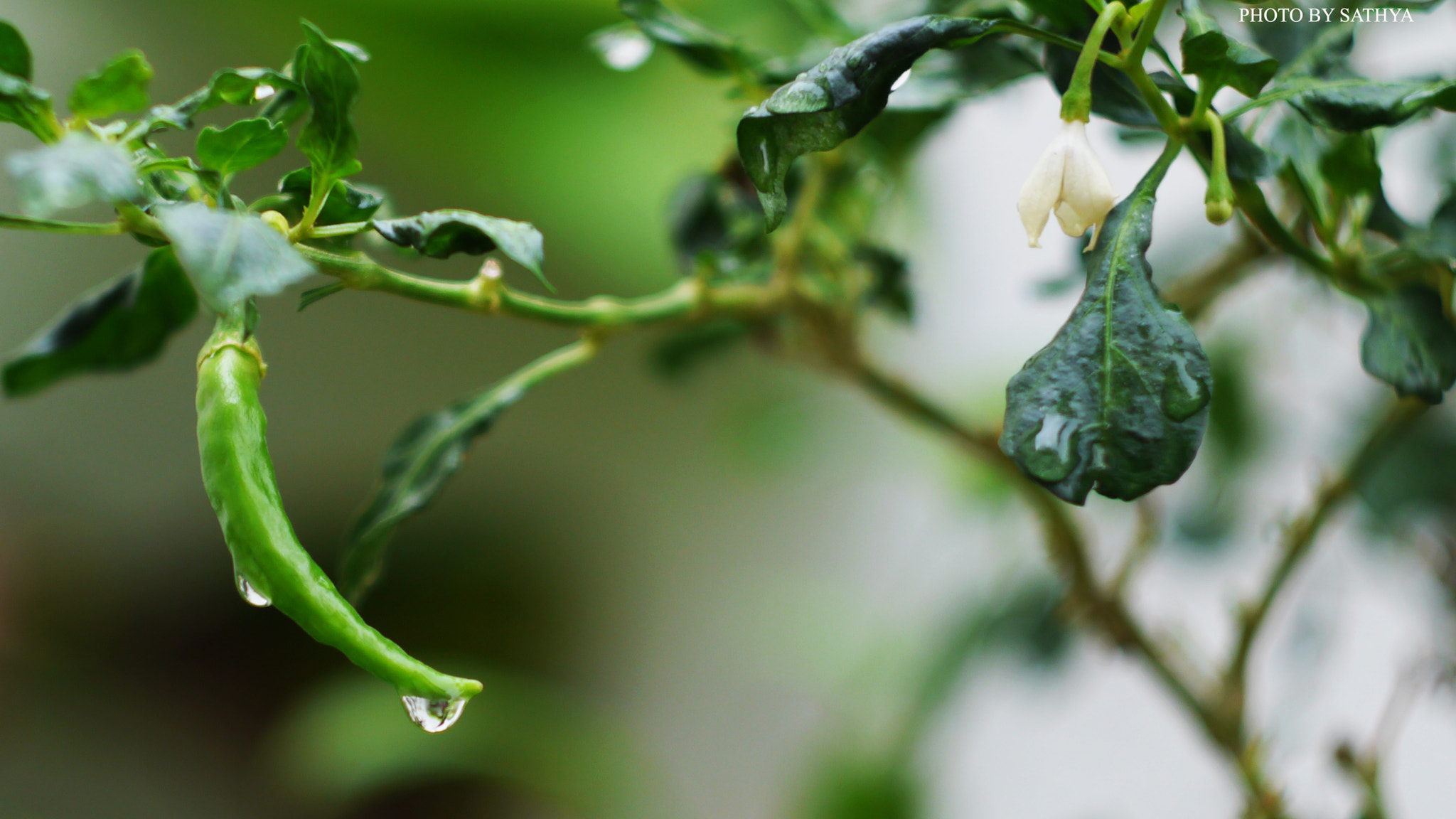
Er jing tiao

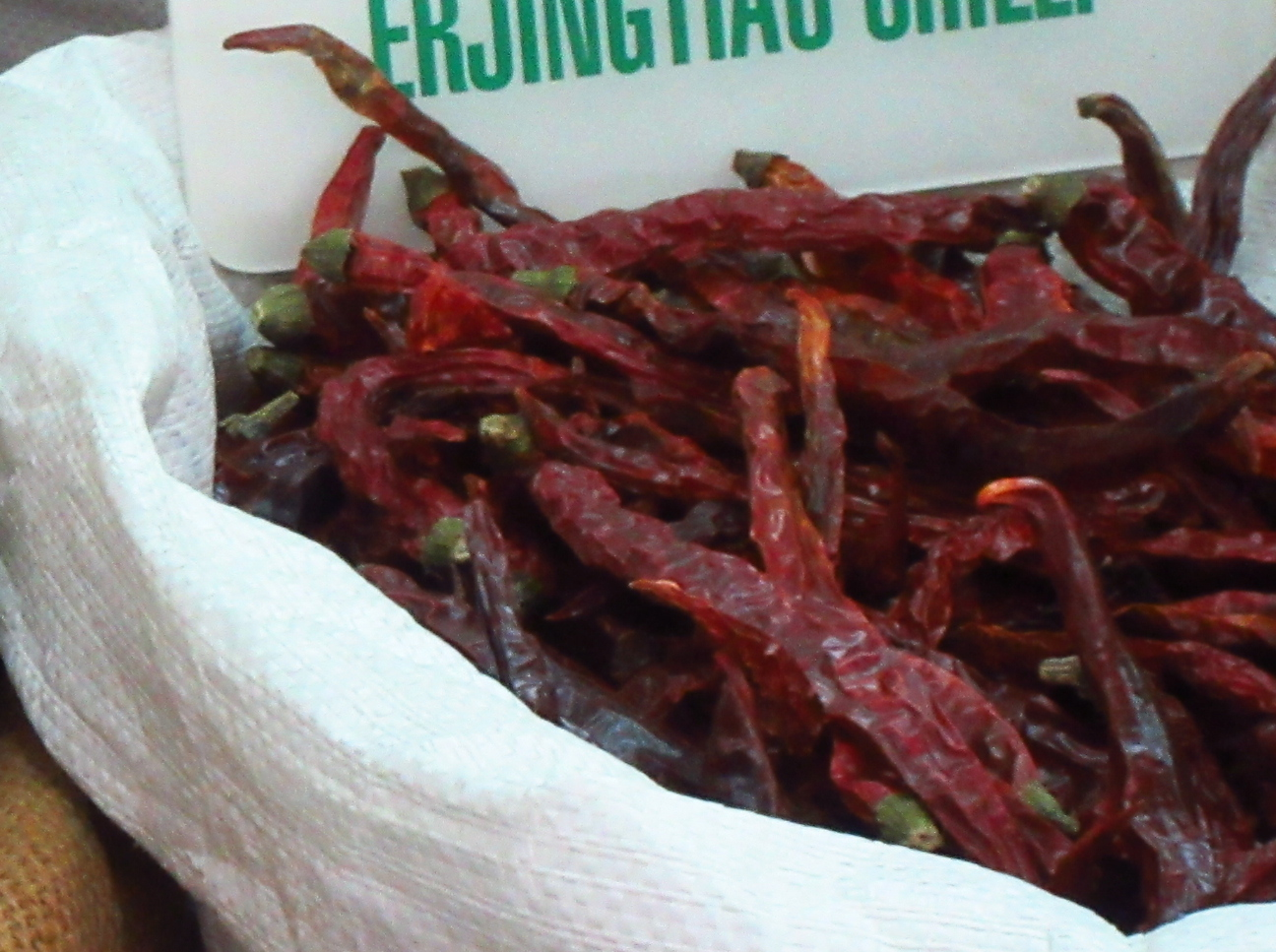
Dried erjingtiao chilli peppers

Er jing tiao (simplified Chinese: 二荆条; traditional Chinese: 二荊條; pinyin: Èr jīngtiáo) is a variety of chili that is most common in Sichuan cuisine of China. The chili is typically shaped like the letter J and is between 5 and 6 inches long. This chili is known for its deep color and robust fragrance, and is often used in chili oil for that reason. It is also a major ingredient for many famous chili sauce products, such as the thick broad-bean sauce doubanjiang. It has a medium spicy and salty flavor which is used in combination with noodles or rice. It has a long history in Chinese cuisine and has gained popularity over time. It is easy to find in traditional authentic Sichuan cuisine, whether in a restaurant or home kitchens. Er jing tiao's taste is different from common types of chili; its taste and smell are of medium spiciness but with intense fragrance. Its colors change from green to red as time passes. They are also eaten as a fresh vegetable seasoned with salt and soy sauce as well as preserved as a salted and (lacto-) fermented chili condiment known as duo jiao (duò jiāo 剁椒, lit. 'chopped chili'). Harvesting time is usually from early May to October.

== Current use ==
There are multiple methods to cook the chilis depending on one's personal eating habits. At most times, Er jing tiao was considered to be a useful and tasty food ingredient to be processed and made into a dish or spicy oil. It is also ground into a dry chili sauce that is commonly available for purchase. Moreover, Er jing tiao is also made into spicy broad bean paste which is a major ingredient in cooking Sichuan dishes such as mapo tofu. Another example, chilli powder, is a common processed seasoning product made from chopped dried chilies such as er jing tiao by stir frying it with a small amount of vegetable oil and leaving it aside to cool. After cooling, put in a container and ground into powder when the chillis are crispy. Fine chili powders are generally used for relatively simple dishes; a small amount could gave the dish a strong flavor, it could enhance color, or be made into dried chili dipping sauce.

== Cultivation ==
The seed germination temperature is 23–30 °C; if below 15 °C can not germinate. Pepper seeds require higher temperatures, and they grow more slowly when the temperature is relatively low. At the beginning of the flowering season, the temperature is 20–25 °C during the daytime and 15–20 °C during the night. Chilis should not be cultivated with vegetables such as eggplant and potatoes, etc., because their needs for water, fertilizer and light are different. Not all er jing tiao are bred inside Sichuan province: some are grown in neighboring Guizhou province, which is considered a better planting environment since it is less polluted. For the breeding site conditions: the altitude is 445 meters to 550 meters; the terrain is high dry; the irrigation and drainage is convenient; the soil layer is deep and loose, and the slightly acidic yellow loam soil has a pH value of 6.1 to 6.8; the organic matter content is ≥1.5% or more.

=== Cultivation management ===
1. Seed selection: Select the seed of the second Jingjiao pepper that is purified and rejuvenated, and the seed quality should meet the relevant requirements of the state.
2. Rotation: Three to four years of rotation with Solanaceae vegetables.
3. Planting inside greenhouse in late or mid-October, averagely 7 grams~8 grams of seeds per square meters.
4. Ramet: When the seedlings grow bigger and have 3~4 leaves, the seedlings would be planted into different holes every 10 cm.
5. Field management: Before reaching the final stable planting, it should be watered based on a regular timetable, at the early stage around 0.1% boron fertilizer should be applied. After it grows bigger, apply extra 0.2% of potassium dihydrogen phosphate plus 0,1%~0.2% of urea in the middle and late stages.
6. Harvesting time: From July 5th to August 15th, when the color turns a deep red, it could be collected.

=== Disease prevention ===
Check the plant's growing status regularly, and remove and burn any diseased plants immediately. Disease can occur any time during the reproductive cycle, but is most commonly found in the early stage. The bottom of the stem would appear to be dark green or brown in diseased plants. When the humidity is high, it would have white mildew layer on the surface, which is the pathogen cyst and sac. After drying, it forms dark brown streaks, and the branches above will wither rapidly.
