= Beef carcass classification =

Classification for sale of beef

Countries regulate the marketing and sale of beef by observing criteria of cattle carcasses at the abattoir (slaughterhouse) and classifying the carcasses. This classification, sometimes optional, can suggest a market demand for a particular animal's attributes and therefore the price owed to the producer.

== USDA grading system ==
In the United States, the United States Department of Agriculture's (USDA's) Agricultural Marketing Service (AMS) operates a voluntary beef grading program that began in 1917. A meat processor pays for a trained AMS meat grader to grade whole carcasses at the abattoir. Such processors are required to comply with Food Safety and Inspection Service (FSIS) grade labeling procedures. The official USDA grade designation can appear as markings on retail containers, individual bags, or on USDA shield stamps, as well as on legible roller brands appearing on the meat itself.

The USDA grading system uses eight different grades to represent various levels of marbling in beef: Prime, Choice, Select, Standard, Commercial, Utility, Cutter, and Canner. The grades are based on two main criteria: the degree of marbling (intramuscular fat) in the beef, and the maturity (estimated age of the animal at slaughter). Prime has the highest marbling content when compared to other grades, and can fetch a premium at restaurants and supermarkets. As of June 2009, about 2.9% of carcasses grade as Prime. Choice is the most common grade sold in retail outlets, and represents roughly half of all graded beef. Select is sold as a cheaper, leaner option in a number of stores and is the lowest grade typically found for consumer purchase as a steak. Younger cattle (under 42 months of age) tend to be graded as Prime, Choice, Select or Standard, while older cattle are more likely to be graded Commercial, Utility, Cutter, or Canner. These latter grades of beef are used for ground products rather than for consumer sale or food service.

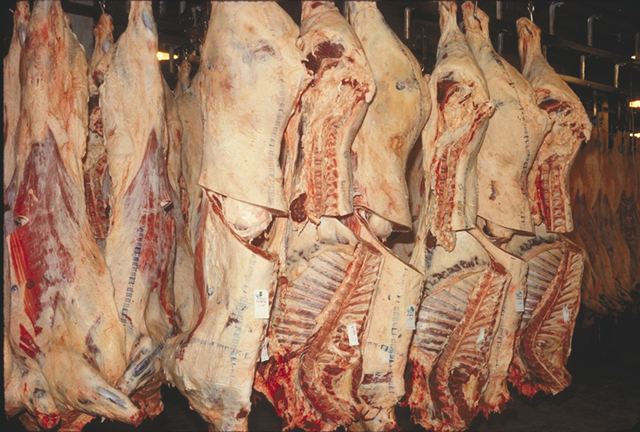
Inspected carcasses tagged by the USDA

Some meat scientists object to the current scheme of USDA grading because it is not based on direct measurement of tenderness, although marbling and maturity are indicators of tenderness. Most other countries' beef grading systems mirror the U.S. model, except for those in the European Union (EU). The EU employs a grading scheme that emphasizes carcass shape and amount of fat covering instead of marbling and aging. The differences in grading yield incompatible value judgments of beef value in the United States and the EU. Most beef offered for sale in supermarkets in the United States is graded U.S. Choice or Select. U.S. Prime beef is sold to hotels and upscale restaurants, and usually marketed as such.

In 1997, the official standards were revised to restrict the Select grade to A maturity carcasses, and to raise the minimum marbling score to qualify for Choice to modest for B maturity cattle. These changes were implemented to improve the uniformity and consistency of the grading system. Yield grades are intended to estimate the pounds of boneless closely trimmed retail cuts from the carcass. Closely trimmed refers to approximately 1/4 inch (6 mm) of external fat. Yield grade is determined by considering four carcass characteristics: external fat; kidney, pelvic and heart fat (KPH); ribeye area (REA); and hot carcass weight (HCW). The amount of external fat is measured at the ribbed surface between the 12th and 13th ribs. The ribbing of carcasses is described in the U.S. standards for beef grading. External fat is measured at a distance of 3/4 the length of the ribeye from the chine bone end. This initial number can be adjusted up or down depending on any abnormal fat deposits. As the amount of external fat increases, the percent of retail cuts decreases.

Kidney fat is assessed subjectively and is expressed as a percentage of the carcass weight. As the percentage of KPH increases, the percent of retail cuts decreases. The ribeye area is measured at the ribbed surface, it can be estimated subjectively or measured with a device approved by the AMS. As ribeye area increase, percent retail cuts increases. Hot carcass weight is used to determine yield grade. As carcass weight increases, percent retail cuts decrease. The following equation is used to determine yield grade:

$${\text{YG} = 2.5
+ \left(2.5 \times \text{adjusted fat thickness}\right)
+ \left(0.2 \times \text{percent KPH}\right)
+ \left(0.0038 \times \text{HCW}\right)
- \left(0.32 \times \text{REA}\right)}$$

There are five grades, 1–5. Yield grade one carcasses are of the highest cutability, while yield grade 5 yields the lowest cutability.

Beef sold in U.S. restaurants and supermarkets is usually described by its USDA grade; however, in the early 21st century multiple restaurants and retailers began selling beef on the strength of brand names and the reputation of a specific breed of cattle, such as black Angus.

== EUROP classification ==
The European Union's EUROP grid method of carcass classification was implemented in 1981. European Economic Community Regulations (EEC) No. 1208/81 and No. 2930/81 were enacted to facilitate the application of a community scale for the classification of carcasses of adult bovine animals. This was to ensure the uniform classification of these carcasses in the EEC and provide more precise definitions of conformation classes and fat classes. The need arose for a common grading scale when member states of the EEC began operating in the common beef market in 1968 (EEC) No. 805/68 and price reporting to the EC became mandatory.

In the UK, the Meat and Livestock Commission (MLC Services Ltd) is responsible for the classification of over 80% of the cattle slaughtered in Britain. The EUROP grid consists of a five-point scale in which each conformation and fat class is subdivided into low, medium and high sub-classes, resulting in 15 sub-classes. In the UK, the fat classes range from 1–5; classes 4 and 5 each have high and low sub-classes, which results in a seven-point scale for fatness. The MLC argues that this subdivision allows a more precise description of the carcass.

The price a farmer receives for a beast sent for slaughter is calculated by multiplying the carcass weight by the classification price for a particular category of animal (heifer, steer, bull, cow, etc.) This classification is subjectively assigned by the meat grader according to the EUROP system where E is excellent, U is Very Good, R is Good, O is Fair and P is Poor. Likewise for the fat class, where 1 is Low, 2 is Slight, 3 is Average, 4 is High, and 5 is Very High. A typical classification would be R4L where the R refers to a "Good” carcass with an “Average” to “High” covering of fat according to the MLC.

The grader is usually an independent classifier who also monitors carcass dressing specification. Most classifiers are employed by MLC Services, and they are audited quarterly by the Rural Payments Agency (RPA), a government organisation. More recently video image analysis has been used to classify beef carcasses according to the EUROP scale. There are several machines that can do this, several of which were trialled in Ireland. Ireland has used video image analysis for assignment of the EUROP classification grid since 2004.

Two main problems that are often cited in reference to the EUROP grid are its subjective application and its lack of consideration of meat eating quality.
