= Moon shrimp cake =

Taiwanese dish

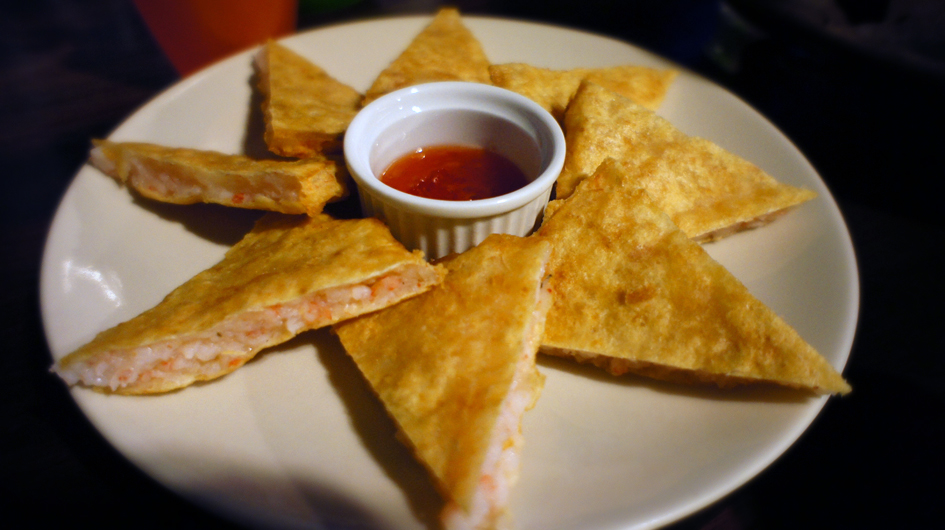
- Slices of moon shrimp cake
- Alternative names: Thai-style moon shrimp cake, yueliang xiabing
- Place of origin: Taiwan

Moon shrimp cake, (simplified Chinese: 月亮虾饼; traditional Chinese: 月亮蝦餅; pinyin: yuèliàng xiābǐng), is a popular Taiwanese xiaochi that is usually served in local Yunnanese-Thai restaurants. Shrimp, garlic, and pork fat are pounded then spread on a circular spring roll wrapper. Another wrapper is placed over top and the cake is panfried and served with sweet chili sauce. The name is said to derive from the shape of the cake that results, like a golden full moon.

== See also ==
- Taiwanese cuisine
- Fishcake
