= FEDS Xinyi A13 =

Shopping mall in Xinyi, Taipei, Taiwan

- 遠百信義A13
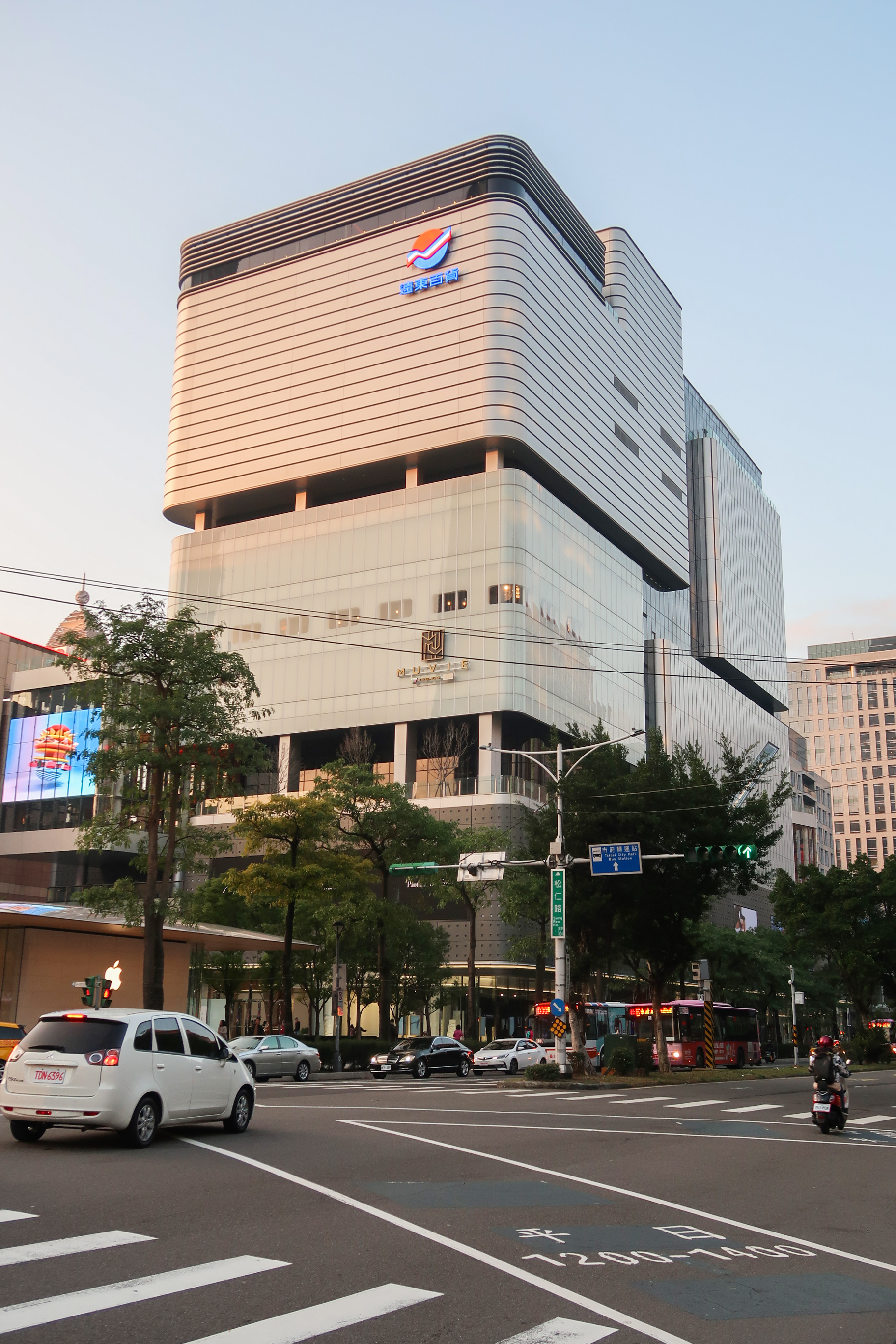
- Location: No. 58, Songren Road, Xinyi District, Taipei, Taiwan
- Coordinates: 25.0364°N 121.5678°E
- Opened: 19 January 2020
- Architect: Kris Yao
- Floor area: 78,217 m^{2} (841,920 sq ft)
- Floors: 14 floors above ground 3 floor below ground
- Public transit: Taipei City Hall metro station, Taipei 101–World Trade Center metro station
- Website: https://www.feds.com.tw/

FEDS Xinyi A13 (Chinese: 遠百信義A13) is a shopping mall located in the Xinyi Planning District of Taipei, Taiwan that started trial operation on 25 December 2019 and officially opened on 19 January 2020. With a total floor area of 78,217 m^{2} (841,920 sq ft), it has 14 floors above ground and 3 floors below ground. Main core stores include Vieshow Cinemas, Lego Store Taipei (the first Lego certified store in Taiwan) and Apple Store Xinyi A13 (the second Apple Store in Taiwan). The mall's revenue in 2020 is around NT$3.8 billion. This is the 11th store of the Far Eastern Department Stores company.

== Design ==
The building is designed by the Taiwanese architect Kris Yao. The fourth storey food court of the mall presents an architectural image of the 1950s and 60s historical streets of Dadaocheng.

== Public transportation ==
The mall is located in close proximity to Taipei City Hall metro station on the Bannan Line and Taipei 101–World Trade Center metro station on the Tamsui–Xinyi line of the Taipei Metro.

== Gallery ==
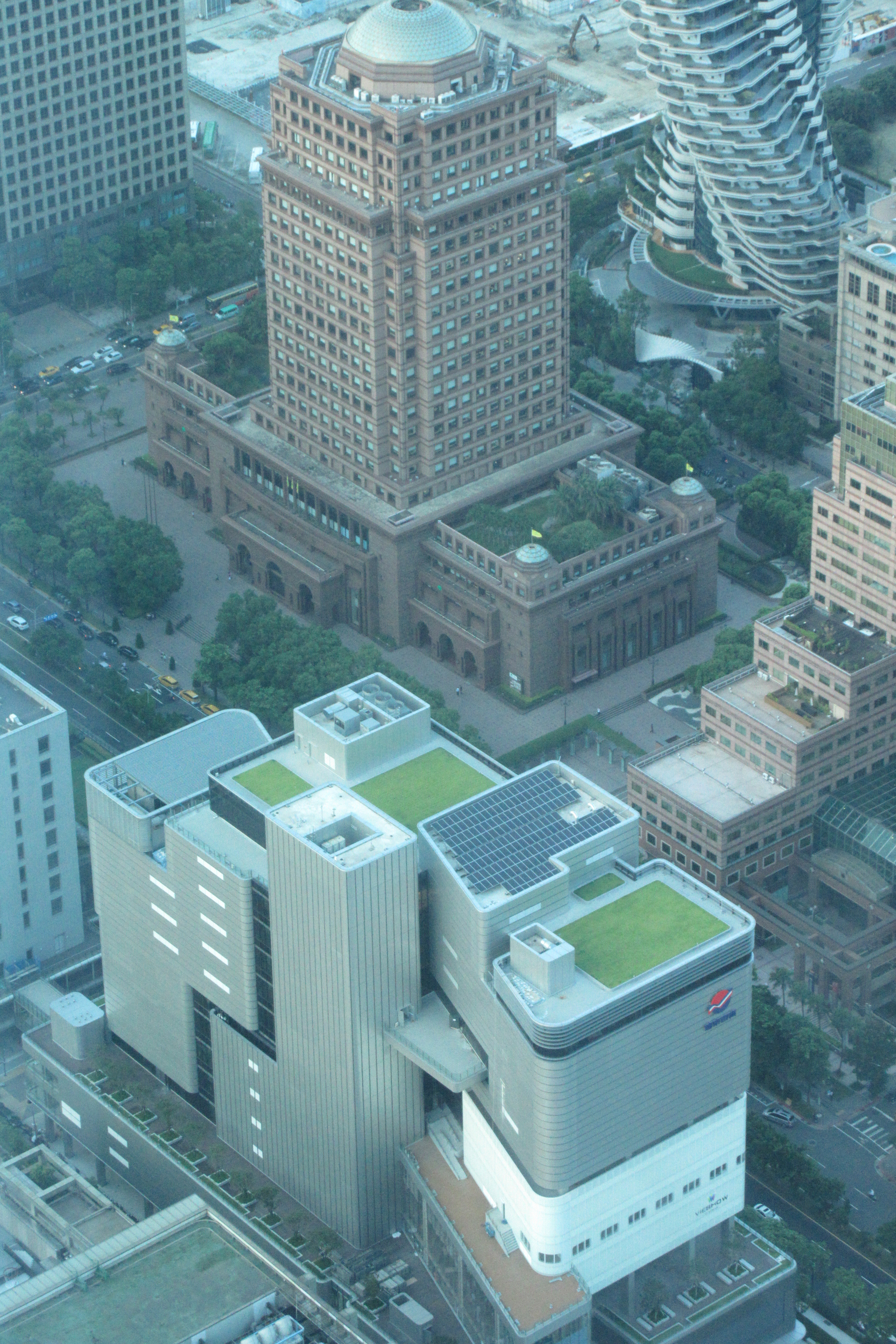
Bird's eye view of the mall

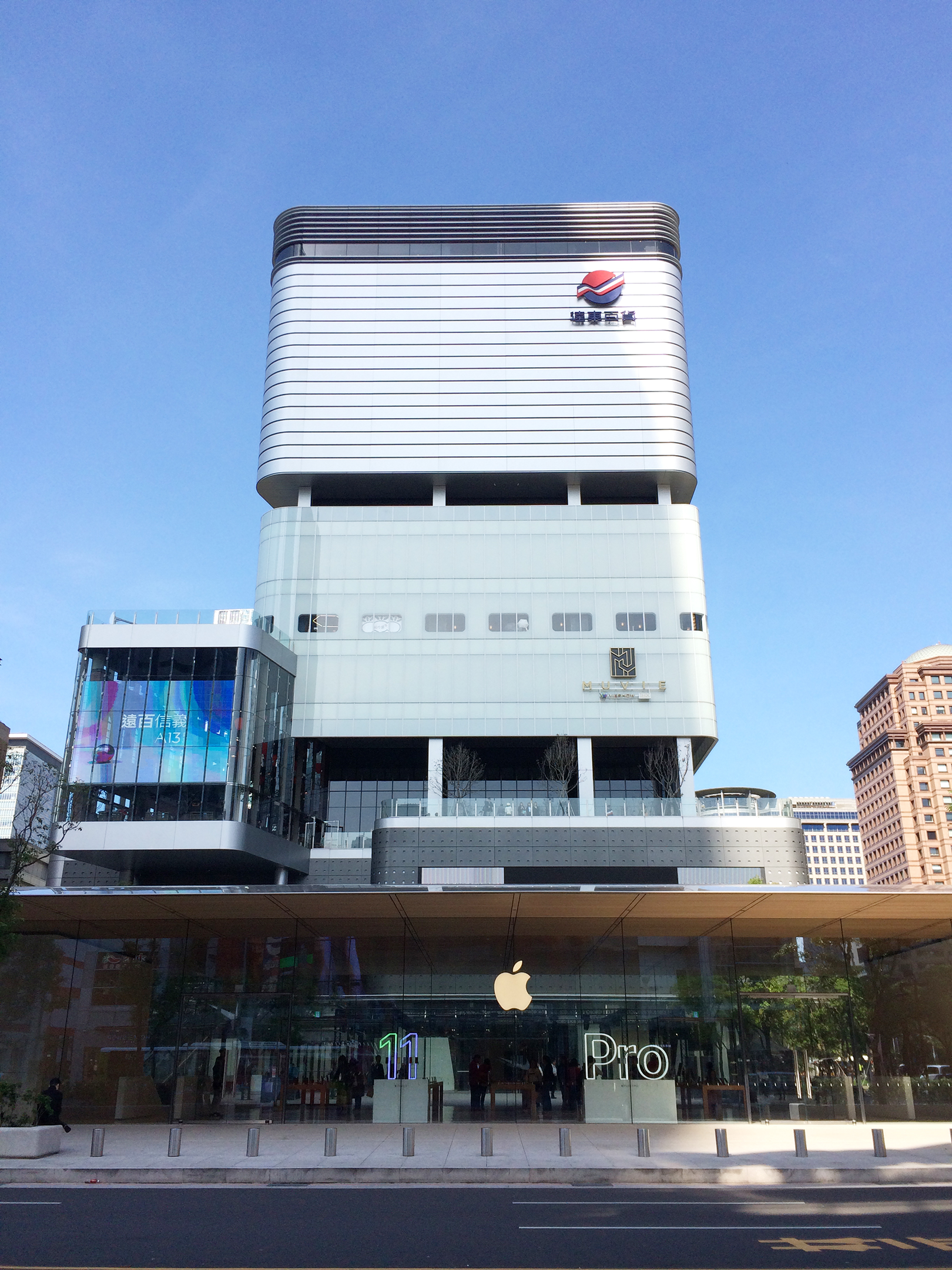
Exterior front

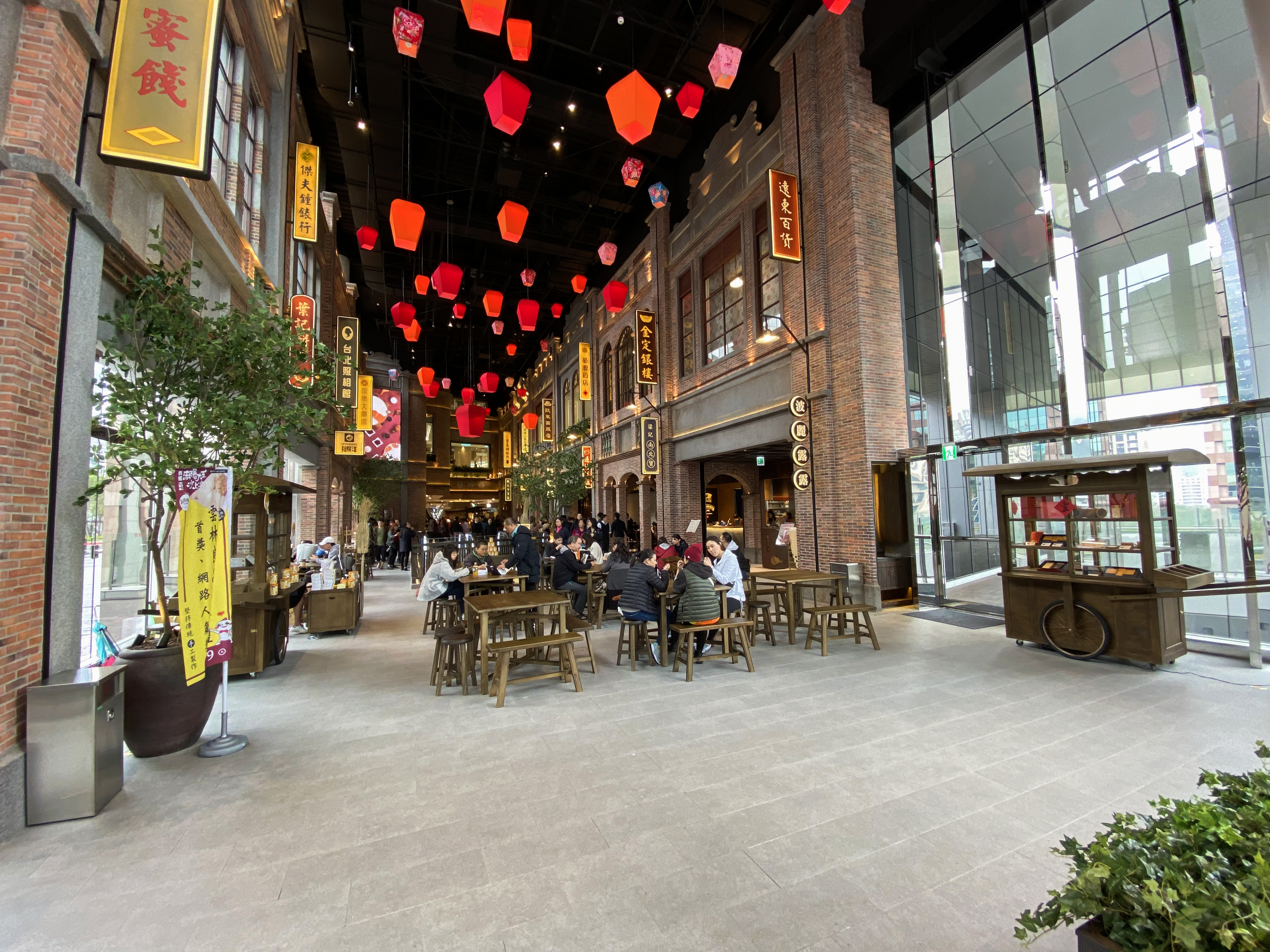
Level 4 atrium

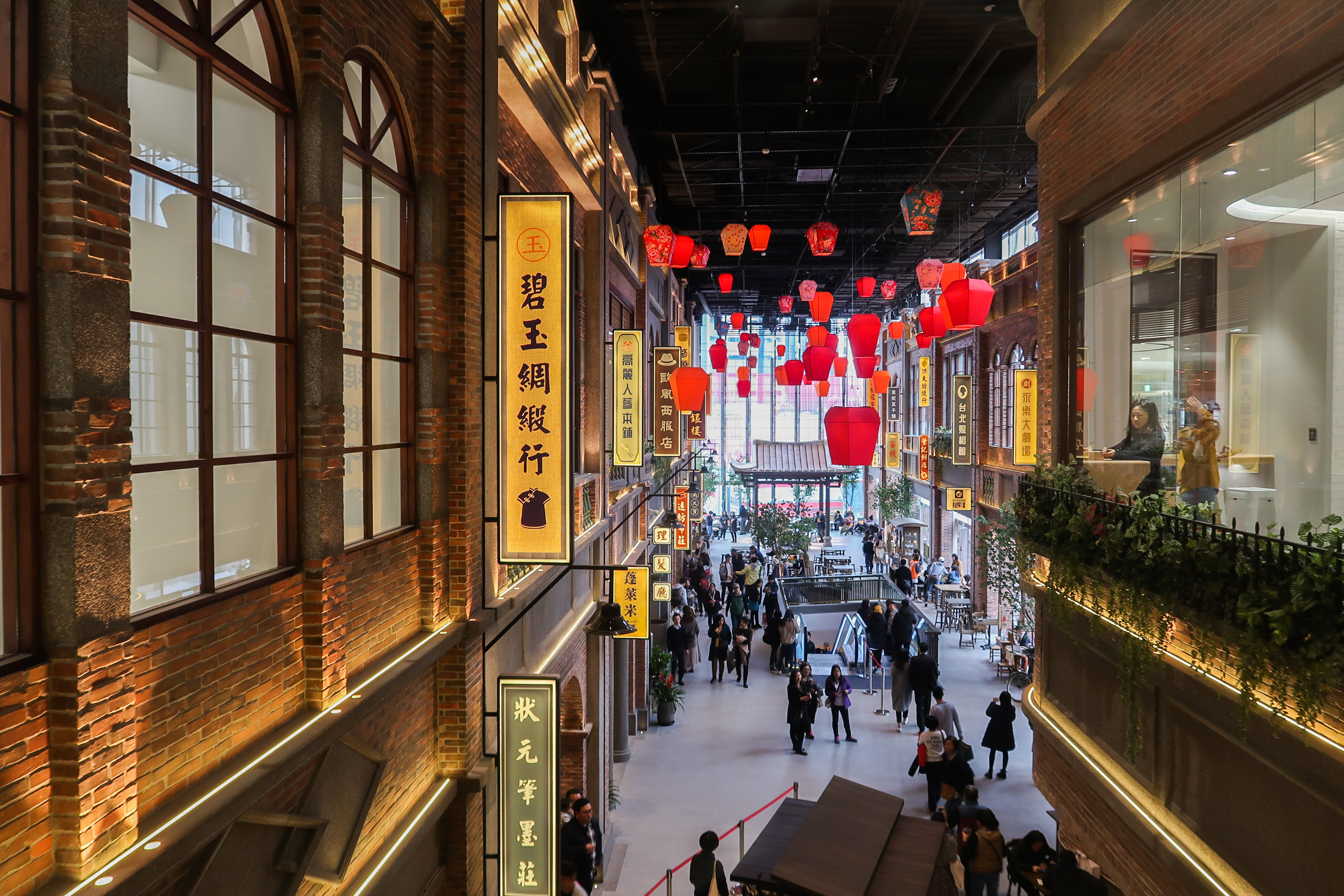
Food court

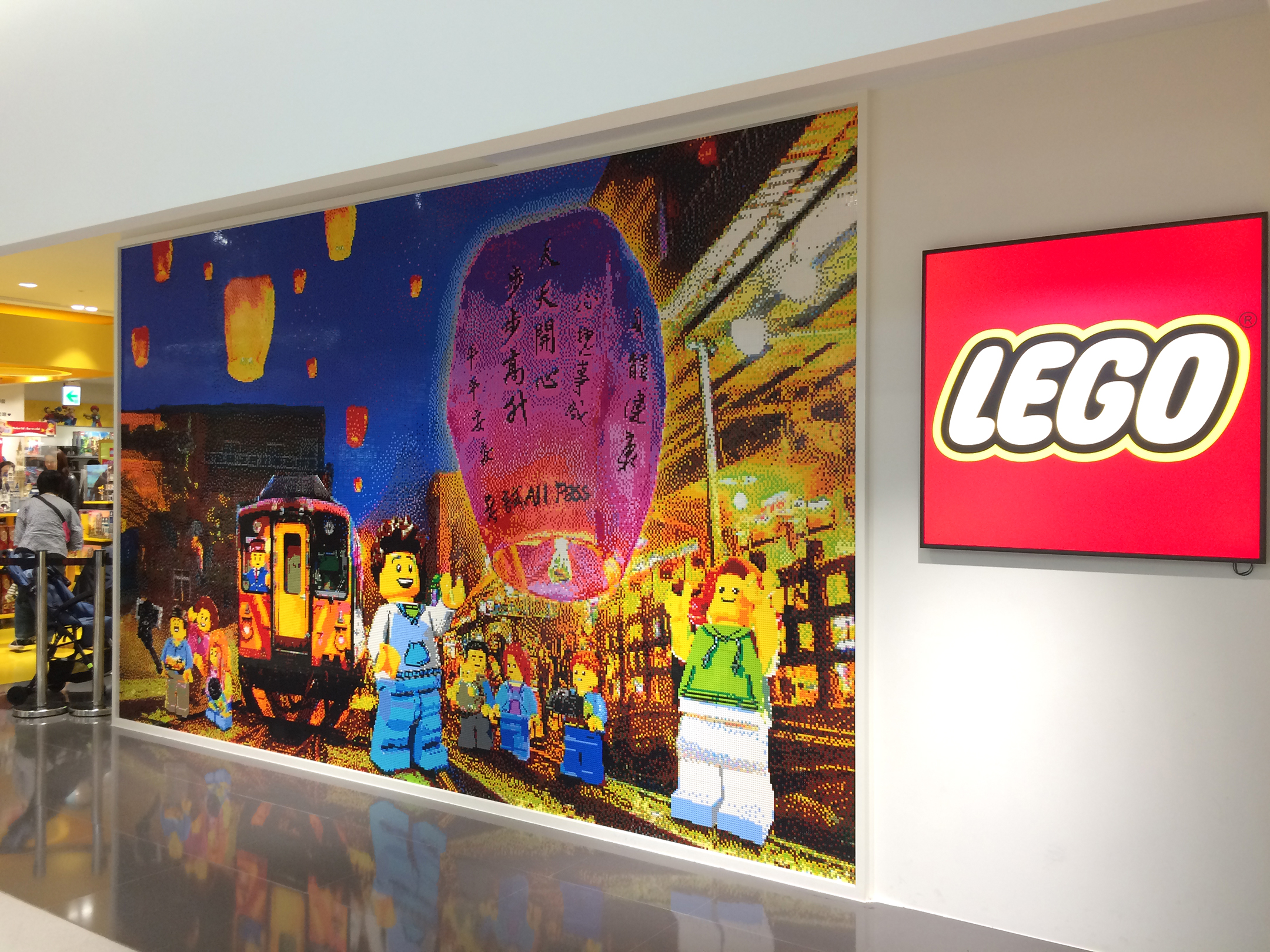
Lego Store

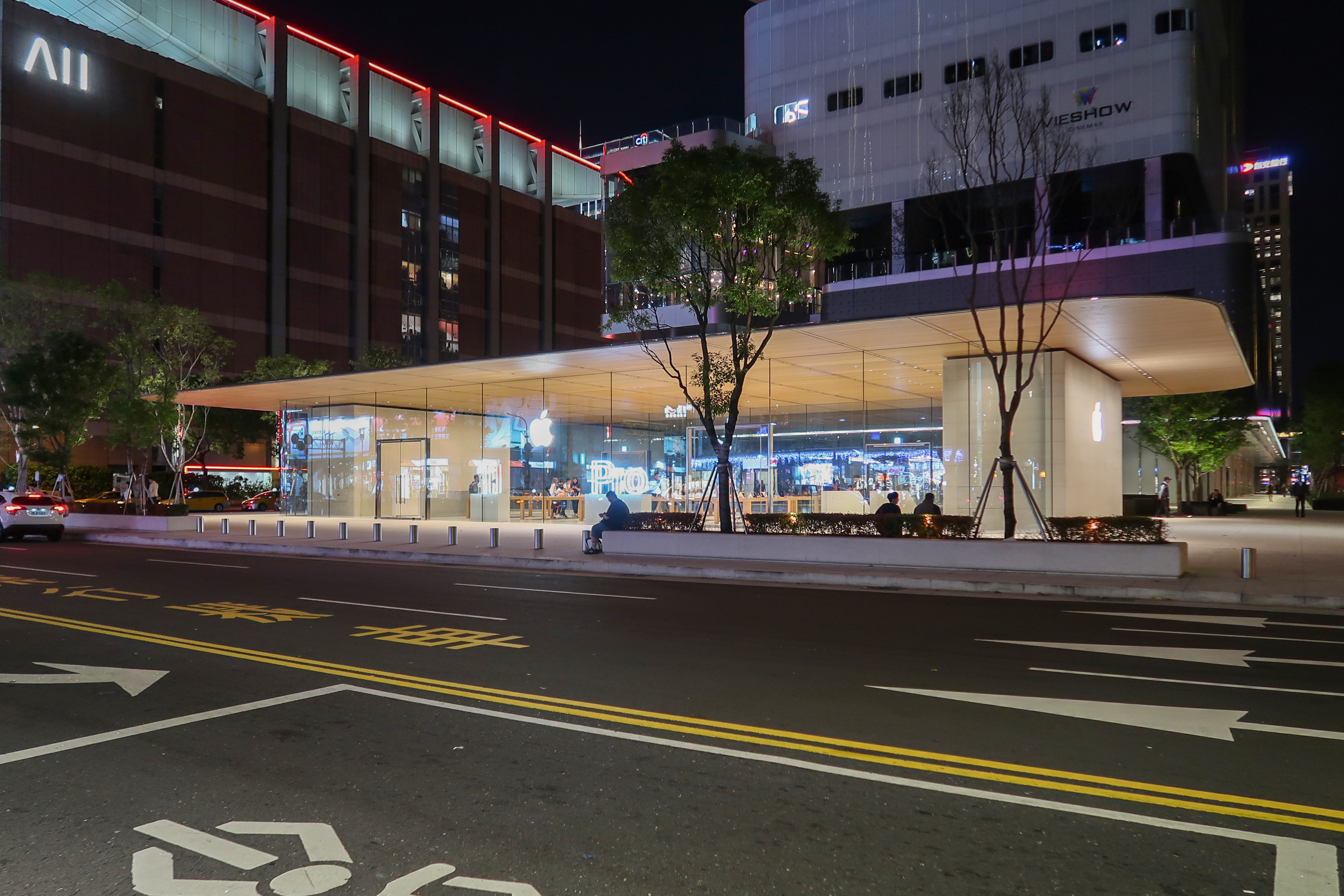
Apple Store

== See also ==
- List of tourist attractions in Taiwan
- FEDS Zhubei
