= FEDS Zhubei =

- 遠百竹北

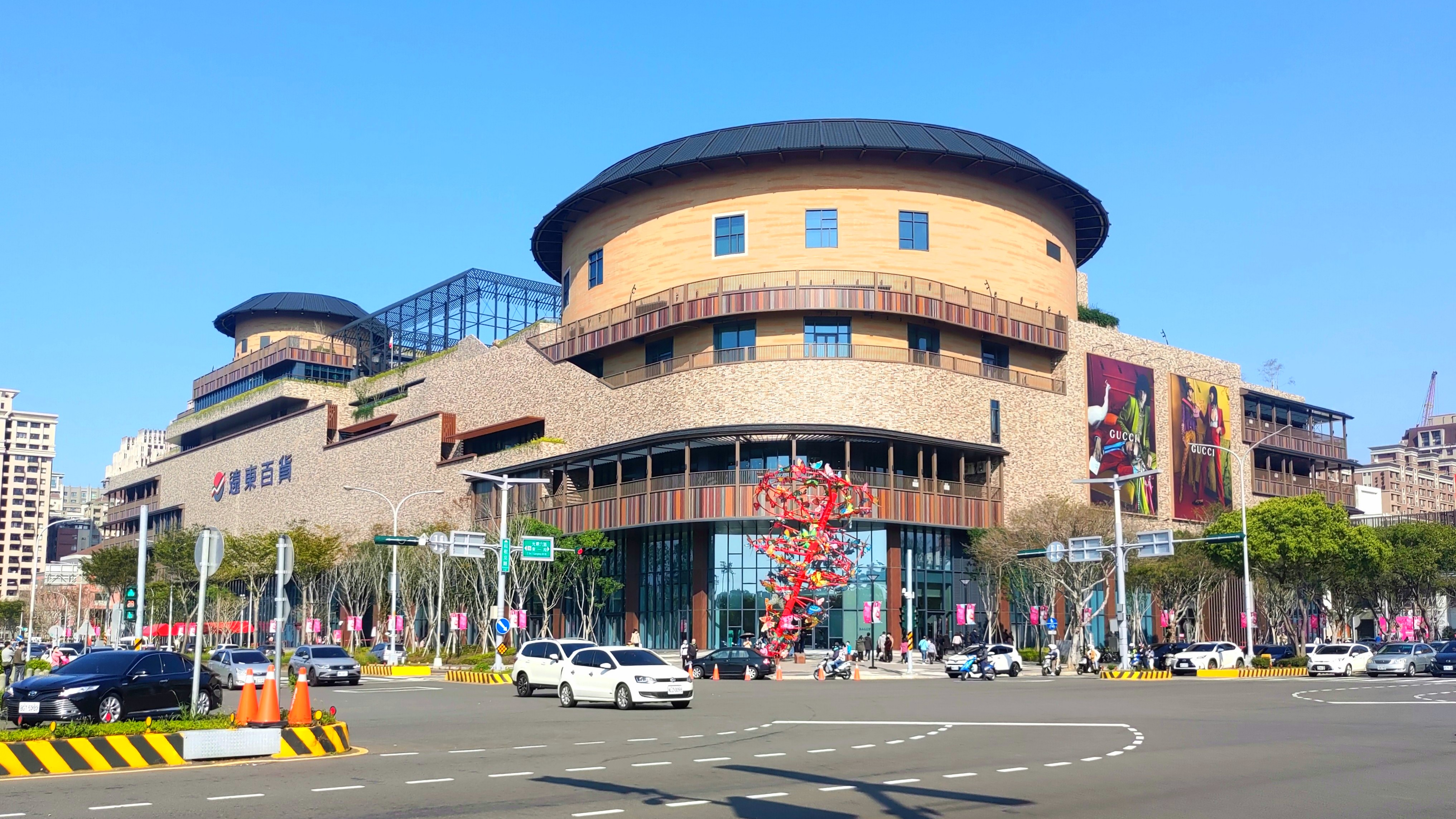
- Location: No. 18, Zhuangjing North Road, Zhubei City, Hsinchu County, Taiwan
- Coordinates: 24°49′21.2″N 121°01′25.2″E
- Opened: 14 January 2022
- Floor area: 141,117 m^{2} (1,518,970 sq ft) (including parking spaces)
- Floors: 10 floors above ground 1 floor below ground
- Parking: 1485
- Public transit: Hsinchu HSR station, Liujia railway station
- Website: https://www.feds.com.tw/

FEDS Zhubei (Chinese: 遠百竹北) is a shopping mall located in Zhubei City, Hsinchu County, Taiwan that opened on 14 January 2022. With a total floor area of 141,117 m^{2} (1,518,970 sq ft), it is the largest shopping mall in Hsinchu County and is located near Hsinchu HSR station. This is the 13th store of the Far Eastern Department Stores company.

== History ==
- On June 22, 2017, the mall started construction.
- On January 14, 2022, the mall started trial operations.

== Design ==
The overall building incorporates the characteristics of Hakka culture, presenting the architectural image of a Hakka walled village, and a sky garden is planned on the ninth level of the mall.

== Gallery ==
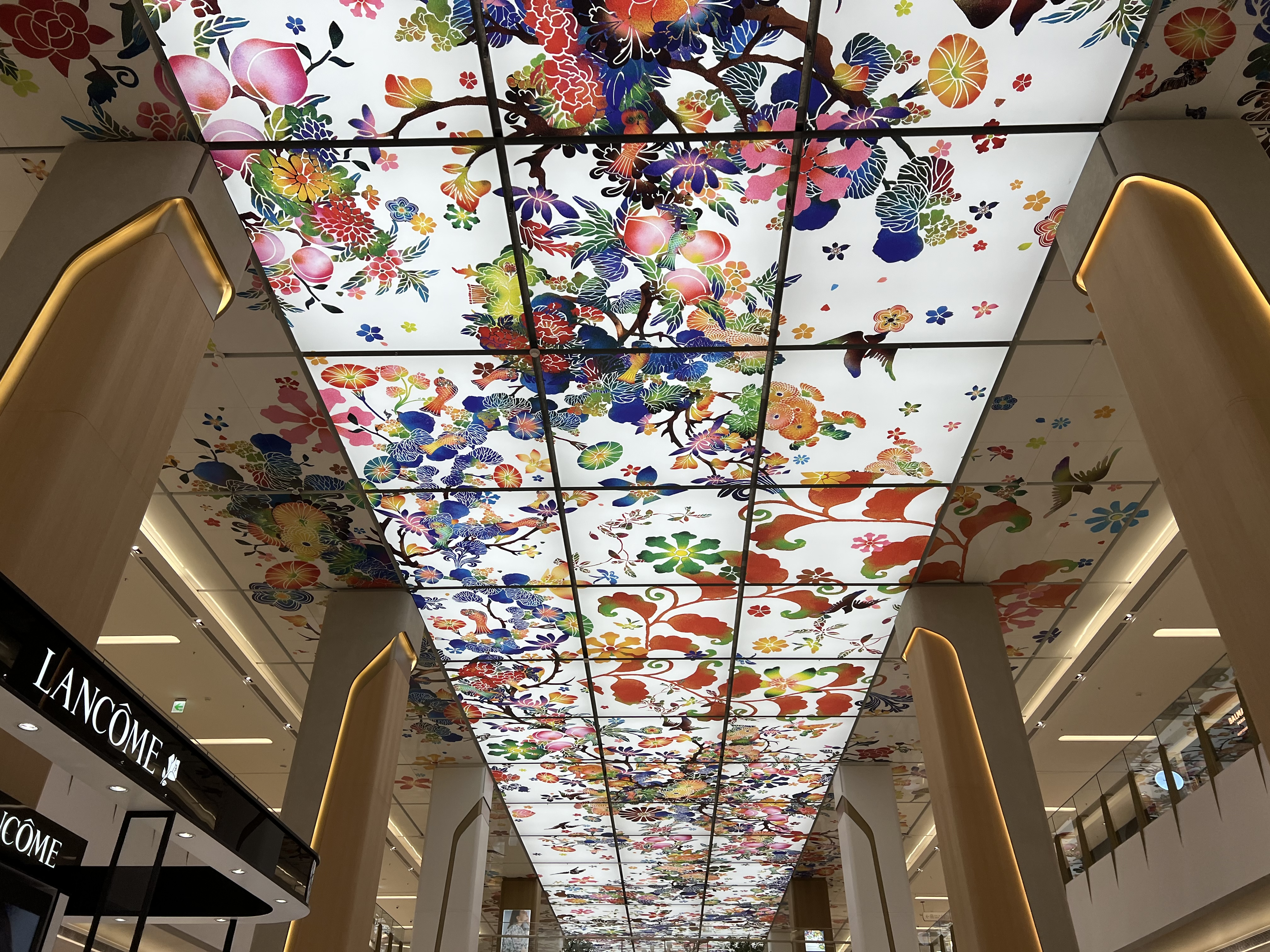
1st floor Ceiling

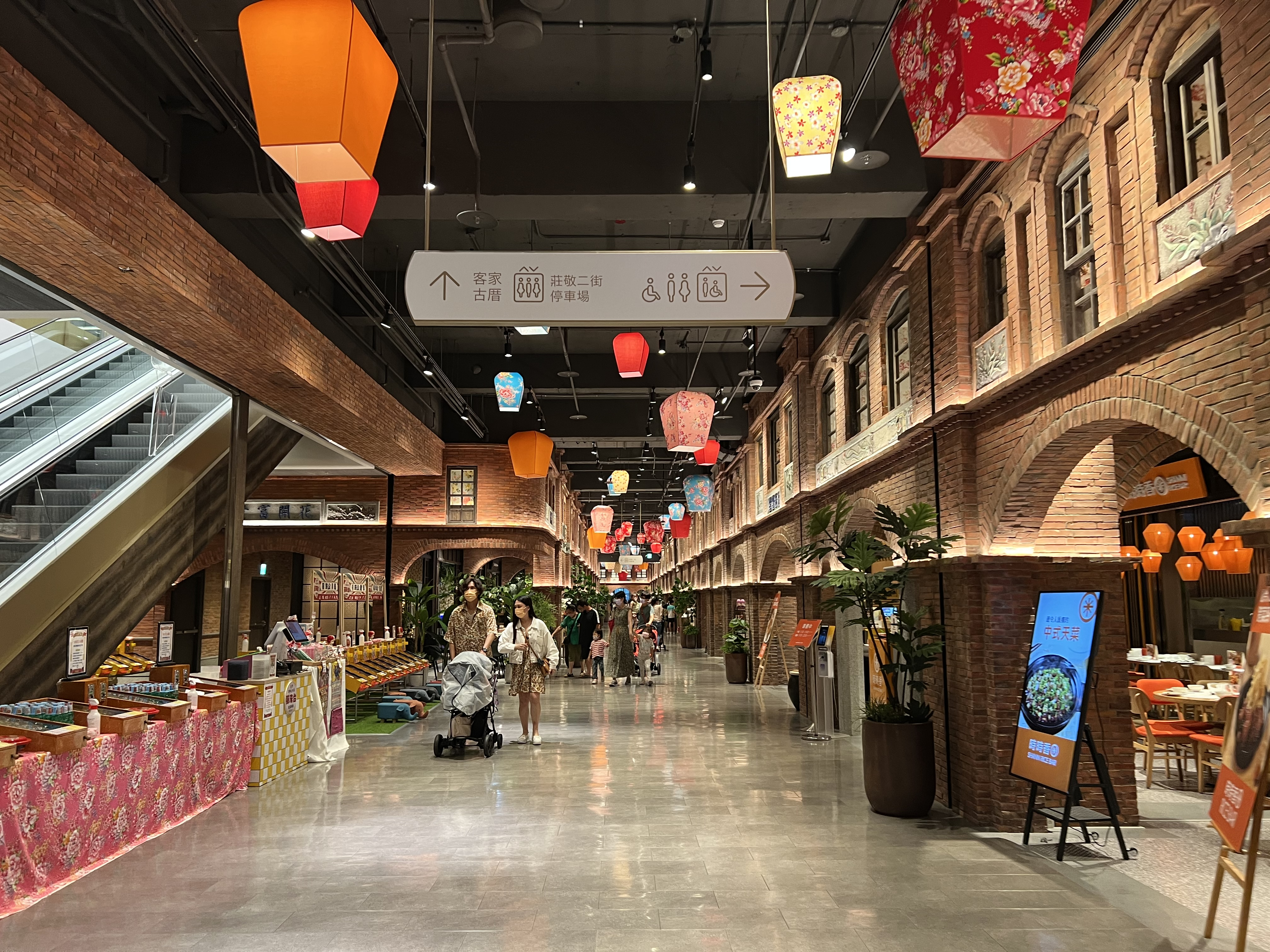
7th floor Hakka Old Street

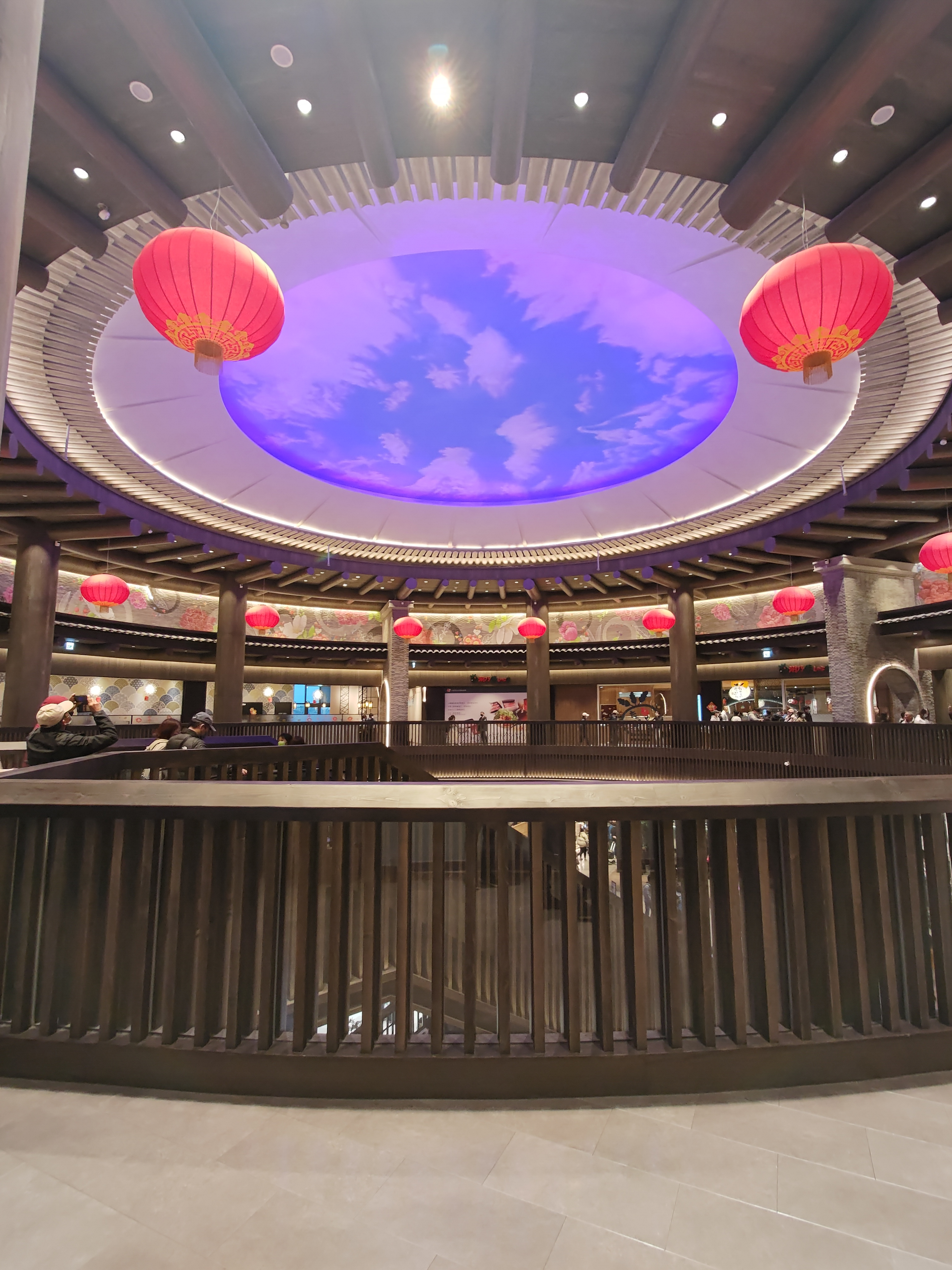
7th floor Hakka Round House

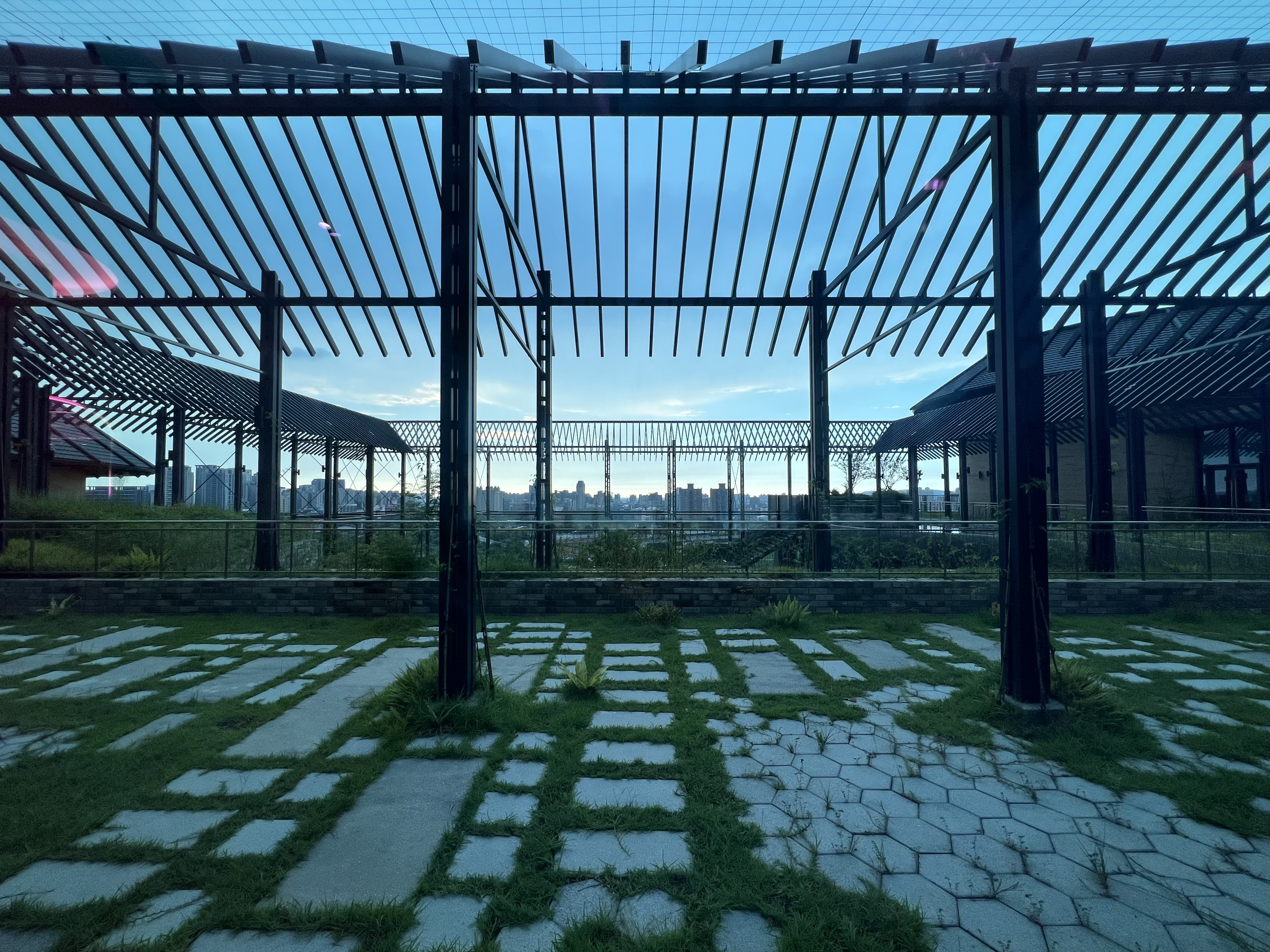
8th floor hanging gardens

== See also ==
- List of tourist attractions in Taiwan
- FEDS Xinyi A13
