= Commercial Times =

Newspaper in Taiwan

- Type: Daily newspaper
- Owner: China Times Publishing Group
- Founded: 1 December 1978
- Language: Traditional Chinese
- Headquarters: Wanhua District, Taipei, Taiwan
- Website: ctee.com.tw

Commercial Times (Chinese: 工商時報) is a Chinese-language financial newspaper published in Taiwan and owned by the Want Want China Times Media Group of Want Want Holdings Limited. It is currently the biggest financial paper on the island. Because of its location in Taiwan, it is often a source for breaking news about the electronics and high-tech manufacturing industry.

== See also ==
- Media of Taiwan
