= Television in Japan =

Television in Japan was introduced in 1939. However, experiments date back to the 1920s, with Kenjiro Takayanagi's pioneering experiments in electronic television. Television broadcasting was halted by World War II, after which regular television broadcasting began in 1950. After Japan developed the first HDTV systems in the 1960s, MUSE/Hi-Vision was introduced in the 1970s.

A modified version of the NTSC system for analog signals, called NTSC-J, was used for analog broadcast between 1950 and the early 2010s. Analog broadcasts in Japan was replaced with digital broadcasts using the ISDB standard. ISDB supersedes both the NTSC-J analog television system and the previously used MUSE Hi-vision analog HDTV system in Japan. Digital Terrestrial Television Broadcasting (DTTB) services using ISDB-T (ISDB-T International) started in Japan in December 2003, and since then, Japan adopted ISDB over other digital broadcasting standards.

All Japanese households having at least one television set, or any device that is capable of receiving live television broadcasts, are mandated to hold a television license, with funds primarily used to subsidize NHK, the Japanese public service broadcaster. The fee varies from ¥12,276 to ¥21,765 (reduced to ¥10,778 to ¥20,267 for households residing in Okinawa Prefecture) depending on the method and timing of payment, and on whether one receives only terrestrial television or also satellite broadcasts. Households on welfare may be excused from the license fee. Notably, there is no legal authority to impose sanctions or fines in the event of non-payment; people may (and many do) throw away the bills and turn away the occasional bill collector, without consequence.

== History ==
=== The foundation of NHK and Kenjiro Takayanagi's research ===
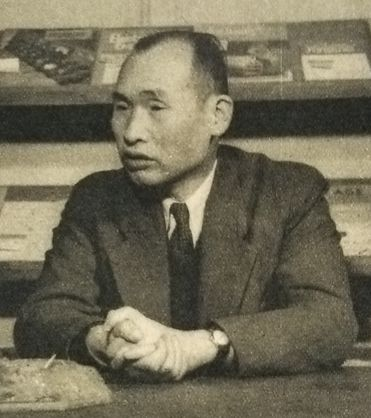
Kenjiro Takayanagi, recognized in his homeland as "the father of television", was one of the pioneers in the technology that was the base for television.

In 1924, Kenjiro Takayanagi began a research program on electronic television. In 1925, he demonstrated a cathode ray tube (CRT) television with thermal electron emission. Television tests were conducted in 1926 using a combined mechanical Nipkow disk and electronic Braun tube system. In 1926, he demonstrated a CRT television with 40-line resolution, the first working example of a fully electronic television receiver. In 1927, he increased the television resolution to 100 lines, which was unrivaled until 1931. In 1928, he was the first to transmit human faces in half-tones on television.

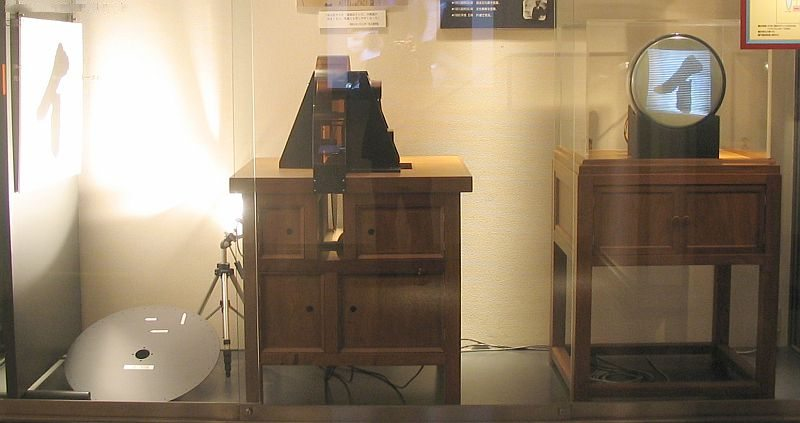
A recreation of Kenjiro Takayanagi's pioneering 1926 electronic television experiment, at NHK Broadcasting Museum in Atagoyama, Tokyo

In the same period Takayanagi also turned his interest to television studies after having learned about the new technology in a French magazine. He developed a system similar to that of John Logie Baird, using the Nipkow disk to scan the subject and generate electrical signals. But unlike Baird, Takayanagi took the important step of using a cathode ray tube to display the received signal, successfully reproducing the Katakana character イ in December 1926. In 1928 his research took a further breakthrough, when he managed to reproduce an image of a person with a resolution of 40 lines at a refresh rate of 14 frames per second. In the 1930s Takayanagi and his research team developed a fully electronic television system using a revised version of the iconoscope. This was followed by the invention of a video receiver capable of reproducing images with a resolution of 441 lines at 30 frames per second, the best on the market at the time.

After the first broadcasts via radio, which became a reality in the second half of the 1920s, the creation of a central institution for the management of radio broadcasting services that could reach the entire national territory became increasingly urgent. At the behest of the Ministry of Communications the local stations of Tokyo, Osaka and Nagoya were thus merged in 1926 into a single national organization called Nippon Hōsō Kyōkai. (Note: The English acronym NHK was only used after the end of the Second World War.) Right after its creation, four other stations were created in other regions, namely Hokkaidō, Tōhoku, Chūgoku and Kyūshū, whose first broadcasts took place in November 1928. In 1930 the Nippon Hōsō Kyōkai founded the Science & Technology Research Laboratories (STRL) with the aim of developing a television set in the wake of the inventions of Paul Gottlieb Nipkow and Vladimir Zworykin.

Meanwhile in Europe, the first regular test broadcasts were being conducted, with Germany ready to broadcast the imminent Berlin Olympics of 1936. The following year, it was decided that the Games were to be held in Tokyo, and the STRL was put in charge of the event's television project. Takayanagi himself and other leading engineers of the time took part in the program and, although the Olympics were officially canceled in July 1938, television research continued, fueled by the zeal of those involved in the project. On May 13, 1939 an experimental television signal was broadcast from the STRL antenna at the new Broadcasting Hall in Uchisaiwaichō, located 13 km away. This represented the first public television experiment conducted through the use of radio waves in Japan.

=== The beginning of regular broadcasts and the end of the NHK monopoly ===
The experiments continued until the end of the decade. Existing equipment was improved and new lighting systems were created along with smaller, lighter cameras to capture moving images. An all-electronic system was adopted in the 1930s using a domestically developed iconoscope system. A variety of productions such as films, variety shows, musical shows and TV dramas (such as the family comedy Yūge-mae (Before Supper), the first dorama in history, broadcast live in four episodes over three nights) saw the light, laying the foundations for the development of the television and electronics industry after the Second World War. During the conflict, however, research on television equipment was suspended and electrotechnical companies gave way to the production of weapons, ammunition and other products for war use. Nippon Hōsō Kyōkai itself, which until then had maintained a certain independence from the government, with the increase in military control over the institutions ended up becoming a simple propaganda weapon of the State.

For a brief period in the aftermath of Japan's surrender, the occupied government banned television research in 1945, but was lifted in July 1946. Takayanagi joined the Victor Company of Japan to continue research on his own end, while the NHK resumed theirs in November. Takayanagi played a central role in jointly developing television broadcasting technology and television receivers with NHK, Sharp, and Toshiba.

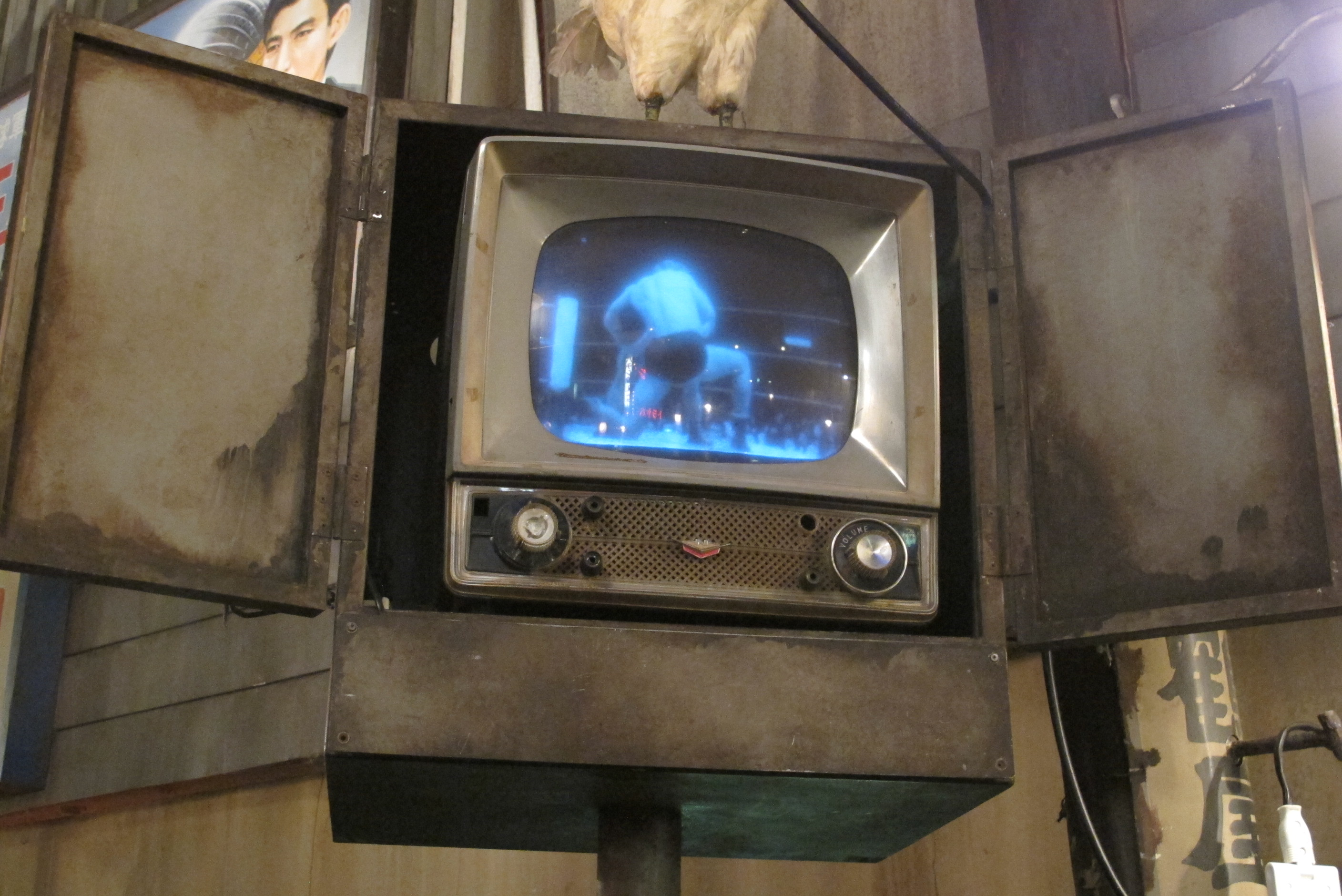
Reproduction of a street television set in the 1950s at the Shin-Yokohama Ramen Museum

After the war, the occupation forces removed all government and military control over the Nippon Hōsō Kyōkai. In 1950, following a reform of the Japanese broadcasting system, it became an independent company supported by the licence fee paid by listeners and at the same time the market for commercial broadcasting was liberalised. On 1 September 1951, the first commercial broadcaster, CBC Radio (JOAR) in Nagoya, started broadcasting, followed shortly after by NJB in Osaka. Subsequently, several other stations obtained broadcasting rights (among them ABC Radio, RKB Radio, KBS Kyoto and KRT Radio Tokyo) and by 1952 there were eighteen private radio stations in operation. Thus a new era began, with the public broadcaster Nippon Hōsō Kyōkai (since then better identified by its English acronym NHK) on one side and commercial broadcasters financed by advertising revenue on the other.

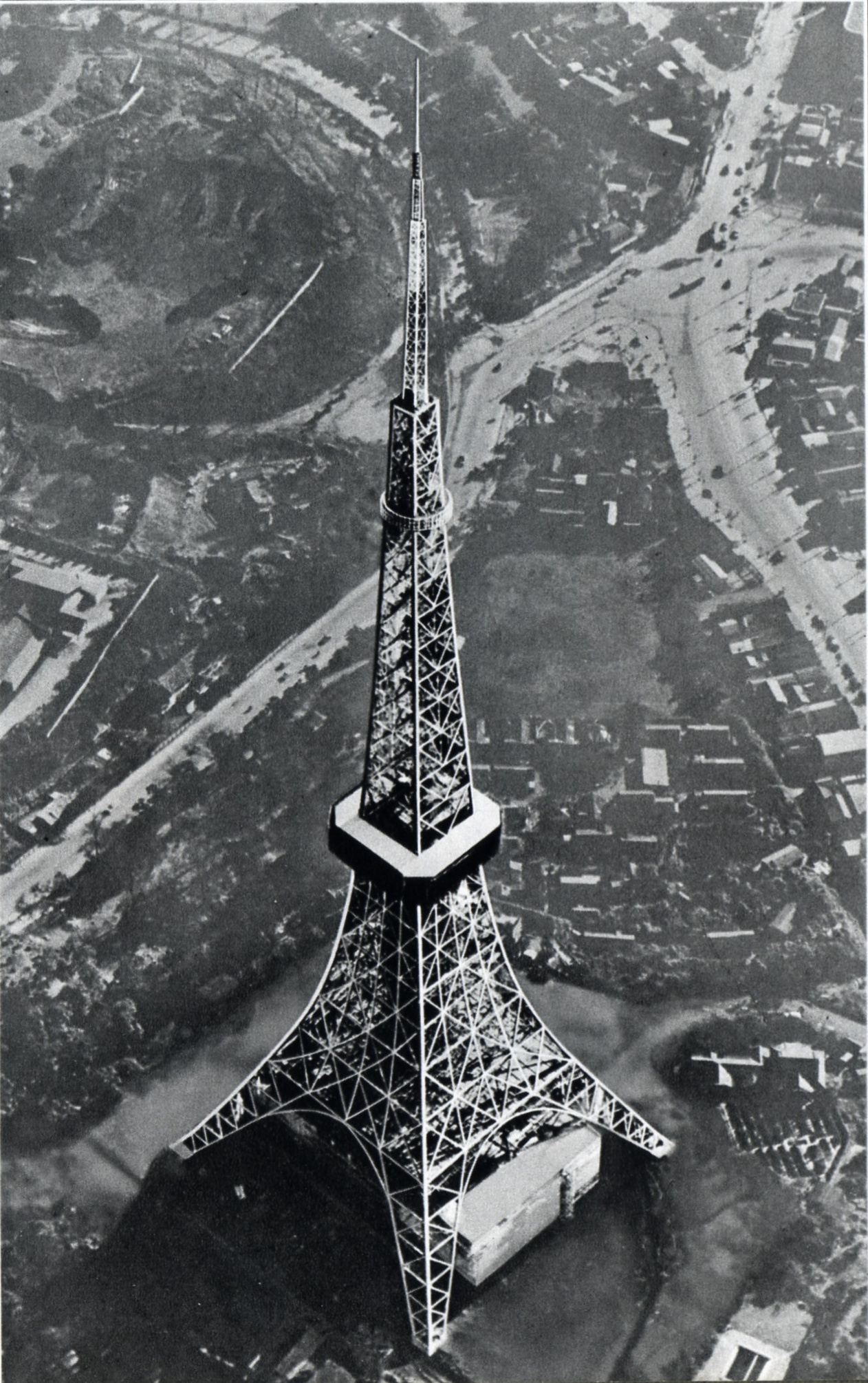
The Tokyo Tower in 1961

In 1948 NHK had resumed its research program but since then no great progress had been made in the effective provision of the service to the public. On May 26, 1951, the House of Representatives requested the government's authorization to finally start television broadcasts in the country and on October 2 of the same year the private broadcaster Nippon Television (NTV) obtained the broadcasting license, preceding NHK by a few months. The latter began its regular television programming on February 1, 1953, broadcasting for approximately seven hours from 2 to 8:45 in the evening; On August 28 of the same year, Nippon Television, the first commercial television, also became operational. The two broadcasters immediately entered into competition by offering viewers schedules with different styles and contents: if NHK insisted on culturally elevated programs suitable for the highest social classes, NTV aimed more decisively at the masses. Initially the high cost of the receivers slowed down their diffusion, when at the end of March 1954 there were only 17,000 subscribers compared to more than eleven million radio listeners. To overcome this problem, televisions were installed in city centres, in train stations and in parks, attracting large numbers of people and helping to spread television culture in the country.

Changes to the television penetration rate in Japan from 1957 to 2015

In the second half of the 1950s, KRT, Fuji TV and NET signed on, joining the existing NTV. By the end of 1956, NHK had perfected its television broadcasting network, reaching, in addition to Tokyo, Nagoya and Osaka (these last two started broadcasting in 1954), also Sapporo and Fukuoka, as well as the smaller cities of Sendai and Hiroshima. In Kantō region, although each commercial station had installed its own transmitting antennas, the government launched a proposal to build a single large tower capable of transmitting the signal throughout the region. In 1958 the Tokyo Tower was inaugurated, symbol of the period of great economic growth which affected Japan in those years.

At the time of the first regular broadcasts in 1953, there were only 3,000 television sets. The year following the royal wedding of Crown Prince Akihito in 1959, the number of sets had increased to 12 million. Local television stations appeared successively on the VHF band, paving way to the first networks, in which a syndication exchange between the five oldest KRT-affiliated stations of the time led to the creation of the Japan News Network, which was formalized on August 1, 1959. The last VHF commercial station to sign on was Tokyo Channel 12 in 1964. Precisely the economic well-being after the Second World War and the lowering of television prices were among the determining factors in the diffusion of television at a national level, which led it to quickly become one of the material goods of greatest importance for Japanese families together with the refrigerator and the washing machine.

=== The arrival of color television ===
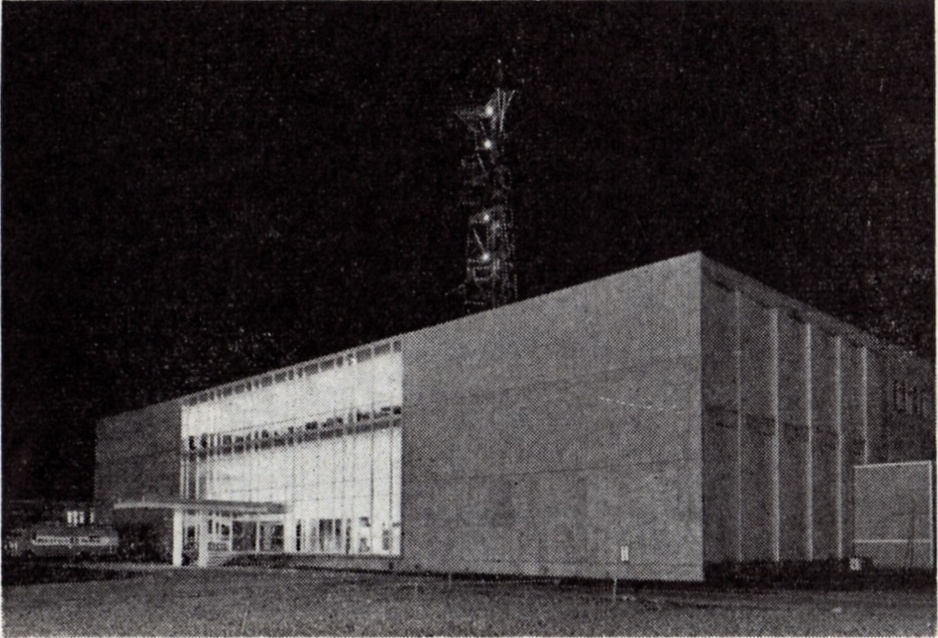
Fuji TV's headquarters in the 1960s

After the United States and Cuba, Japan was the third country in the world to introduce color television. The first broadcasts began on September 10, 1960 using the NTSC television standard, chosen for its ability to make color content available even for owners of a black and white television set. Color programming initially focused on foreign films, time-delayed sporting events, and short educational programs, due to the inadequacy of television stations' equipment. In 1964 the networks worked to broadcast the 1964 Summer Olympics which would have taken place in Tokyo in October of that year, relying on the geostationary satellite Syncom 3 for the live television broadcast. The latter, however, was not the first satellite to have transmitted a television program across the Pacific Ocean, as the Relay 1 satellite transmitted the first program from the USA to Japan in November 1963, on the occasion of the assassination of President Kennedy.

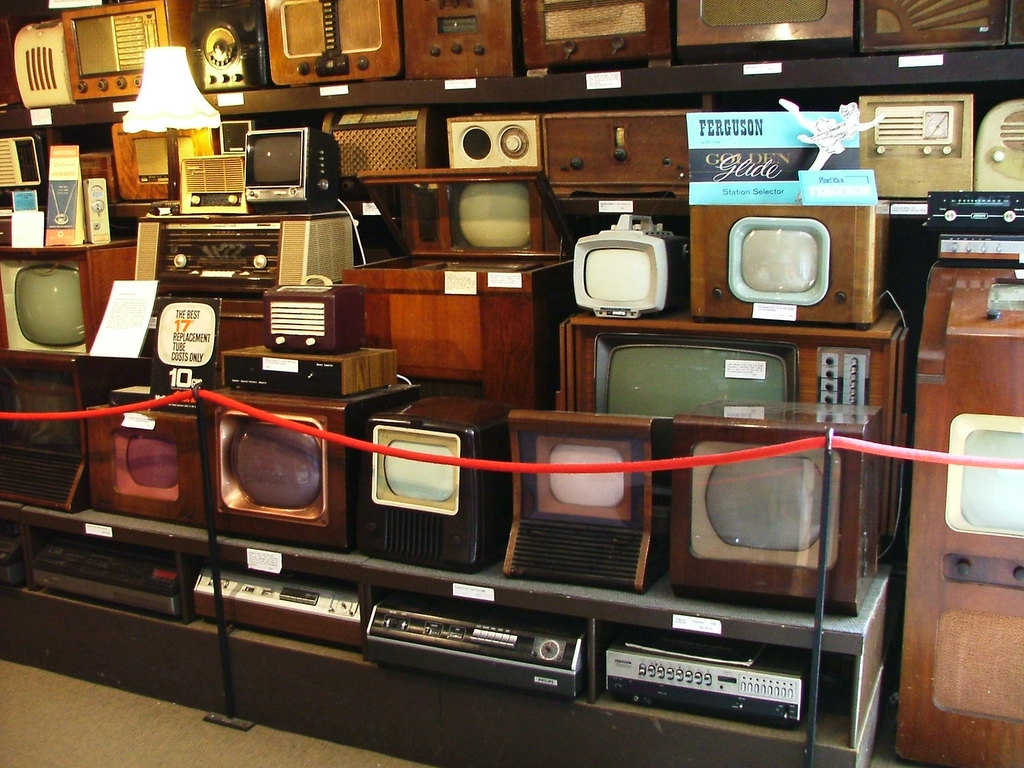
In the years of the Japanese economic miracle the television set becomes indispensable for Japanese

Events of such magnitude and general interest, as well as the wedding of the then crown prince Akihito in 1959, contributed to the rapid popularization of television as a new medium of mass communication. The number of black and white televisions sold exceeded 2 million by the end of the 1950s. However, it took longer for the new color devices to emerge, mainly due to the high prices, and only 1,200 units were sold in the year in which color broadcasts began. Demand grew, however, as prices fell and the production volume increased: from 4,000 units in the two-year period 1962-1963 it went to 1.28 million in 1967 and over 6.4 million in 1970. In November 1975, the number of television sets owned by the general population stood at approximately 46 million, of which 32 million were color televisions.

In the meantime, the last and smallest of the main Japanese commercial broadcasters also appeared on the television scene, TV Tokyo, which began in 1964 as a channel dedicated to cultural and educational programs before later establishing itself also in the entertainment field in general, with particular attention paid to anime.

By the late 1960s, 30 million households owned a television set, commercial TV had 500 transmitters and NHK, 1000. With the early introduction of color television, on the other hand, only a small amount in 1967 afforded such a set, estimated at 80,000-90,000 - aiming for a 100,000 target by spring 1968, accounting to less than 1% of the total number of sets at the time. Its programming in the 1960s was seen as "primitive" for US standards.

The Nippon Hōsō Kyōkai (NHK, the Japan Broadcasting Corporation) began conducting research to "unlock the fundamental mechanism of video and sound interactions with the five human senses" in 1964, after the Tokyo Olympics. NHK set out to create an HDTV system that ended up scoring much higher in subjective tests than NTSC's previously dubbed "HDTV". This new system, NHK Color, created in 1972, included 1,125 lines, a 5:3 aspect ratio and 60 Hz refresh rate. The Society of Motion Picture and Television Engineers (SMPTE), headed by Charles Ginsburg, became the testing and study authority for HDTV technology in the international theater. SMPTE would test HDTV systems from different companies from every conceivable perspective, but the problem of combining the different formats plagued the technology for many years.

The television industry in Japan affected the film industry – in the 1960s, film companies reacted by not allowing their top actors and directors to work on television, not even the formers' production skills. Eventually the film companies lost money.

=== New technologies, UHF, the age of satellite television and the rise of high-definition television ===
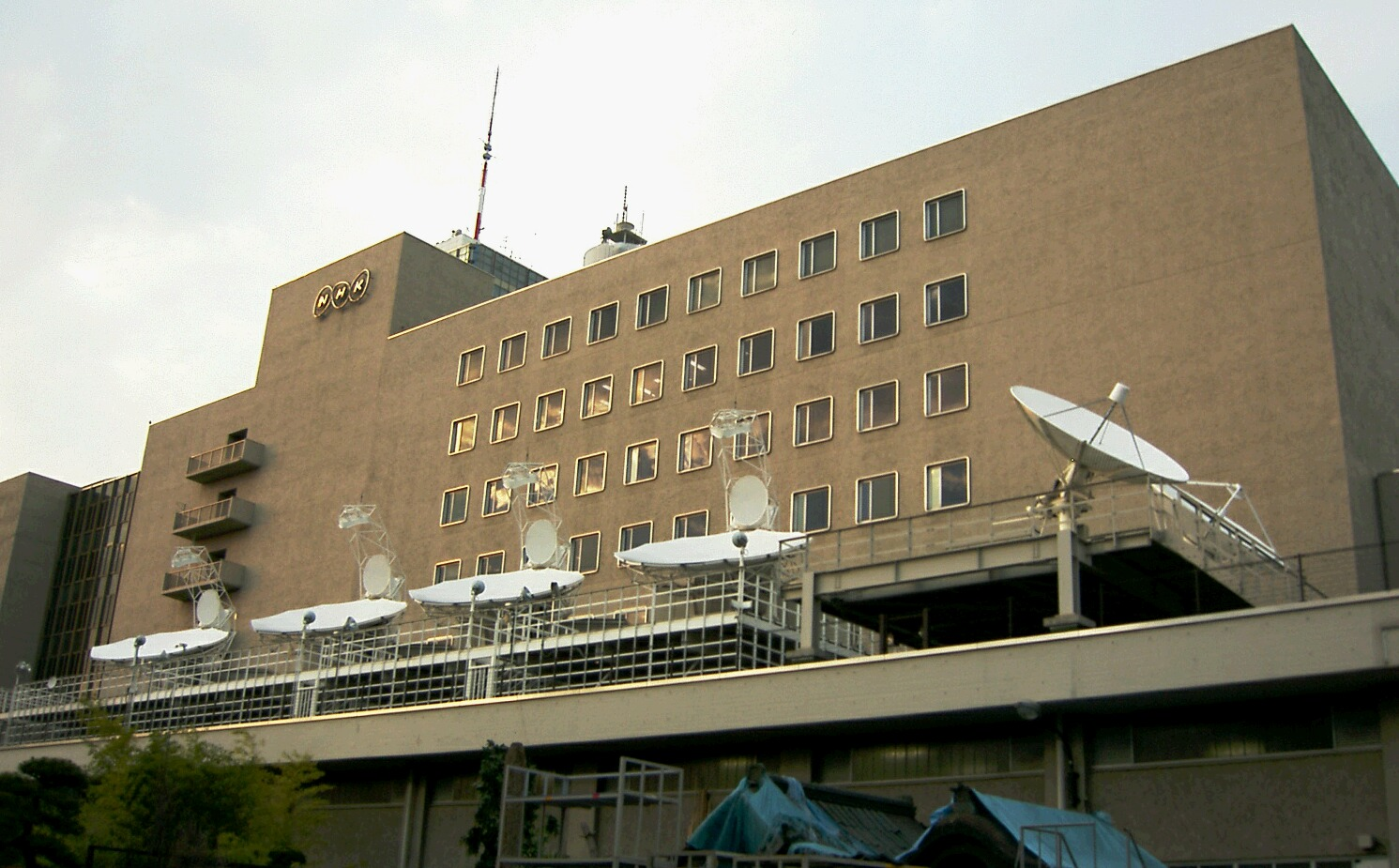
The NHK Broadcasting Center

The first UHF television station to go on air in Japan was the Tokushima station of NHK Educational TV, on February 20, 1968. By then 85% of Japanese television broadcasting was of domestic programs, paid for by hundreds of millions of dollars in TV license, and advertising revenue that was the largest outside the United States.

In 1973, the Space Activities Commission launched the experimental satellite transmission program, entrusting its development to NASDA and management to NHK. Five years later, the first Japanese satellite was launched for direct broadcast satellite (DBS) broadcasts, named BSE or Yuri, but the first tests only began in 1984 by means of the BS-2a satellite. The latter, unlike its predecessors, allowed signal reception even from small satellite dishes of 40 or 60 centimeters in diameter, suitable for domestic use.

In 1989, NHK finally began satellite transmissions, simultaneously launching the new high-definition television technology on an experimental basis. In Japan, research into high definition had begun in the sixties, when Takashi Fujio, director of STRL, believed that television technology, though still analog, had reached sufficient maturity to move from the traditional "small screen" to the big movie screen. The Fujio's team agreed that, both technically and economically, HDTV technology was more easily applicable to direct satellite broadcasts, also taking into account how cable TV was poorly developed in Japan than it had been, for example, in the United States. In the 1980s, NHK thus developed the analog Hi-Vision system with 1125 lines, 60 frames per second and an initial aspect ratio of 5:3 (later upgraded to 16:9), beaming the first high definition analog broadcasts via satellite through the MUSE compression system. However, it took several years before this technology was adopted globally, mainly due to incompatibility with the standards used in the United States and Europe.

In the 1980s, the large-scale diffusion of television sets, which had now become universal objects in Japanese homes, also began to have a certain impact on a social level, contributing to loosening family ties and consequently making family members more independent from each other. This also affected the television schedule, from which in a few years the generalist programs designed to entertain the whole family disappeared, replaced by specific programs based on age groups, in addition to programs designed for a mature audience in the late evening hours.

In 1991, the first subscription satellite television network, WOWOW, is born, specialized in broadcasting films, shows and sports. Facing increased competition from satellite networks, the government announced in 1995 a ban on new commercial terrestrial television licenses from May 1996. The market was on the verge of deregulation in 1996, which enabled the entrance of foreign conglomerates, especially in the pay-TV sector. Only NTV and TBS were listed on the Tokyo Stock Exchange, with Fuji TV and TV Asahi considering joining.

By 1997, the amount of subtitled programming increased, following a Diet session proposing the creation of a bill for that purpose. NHK General TV added subtitles to 14 programs, including all of its dramas, while commercial network did similar actions, with TV Asahi beginning to air Doraemon in that format.

SKY PerfecTV! was born in May 1998 from the merger of PerfecTV and JSkyB, whereas the Japanese subsidiary of DirecTV started its services in December 1997.

With DirecTV retiring from the Japanese market in March 2000, SKY PerfectTV! emerges as one of Japan's largest pay-TV platforms, competing with WOWOW, cable company J:COM and Hikari TV's IPTV service.

In 2000, digital satellite broadcasts began and several other companies entered the satellite market.

=== The digital transition and the rise of the Internet ===
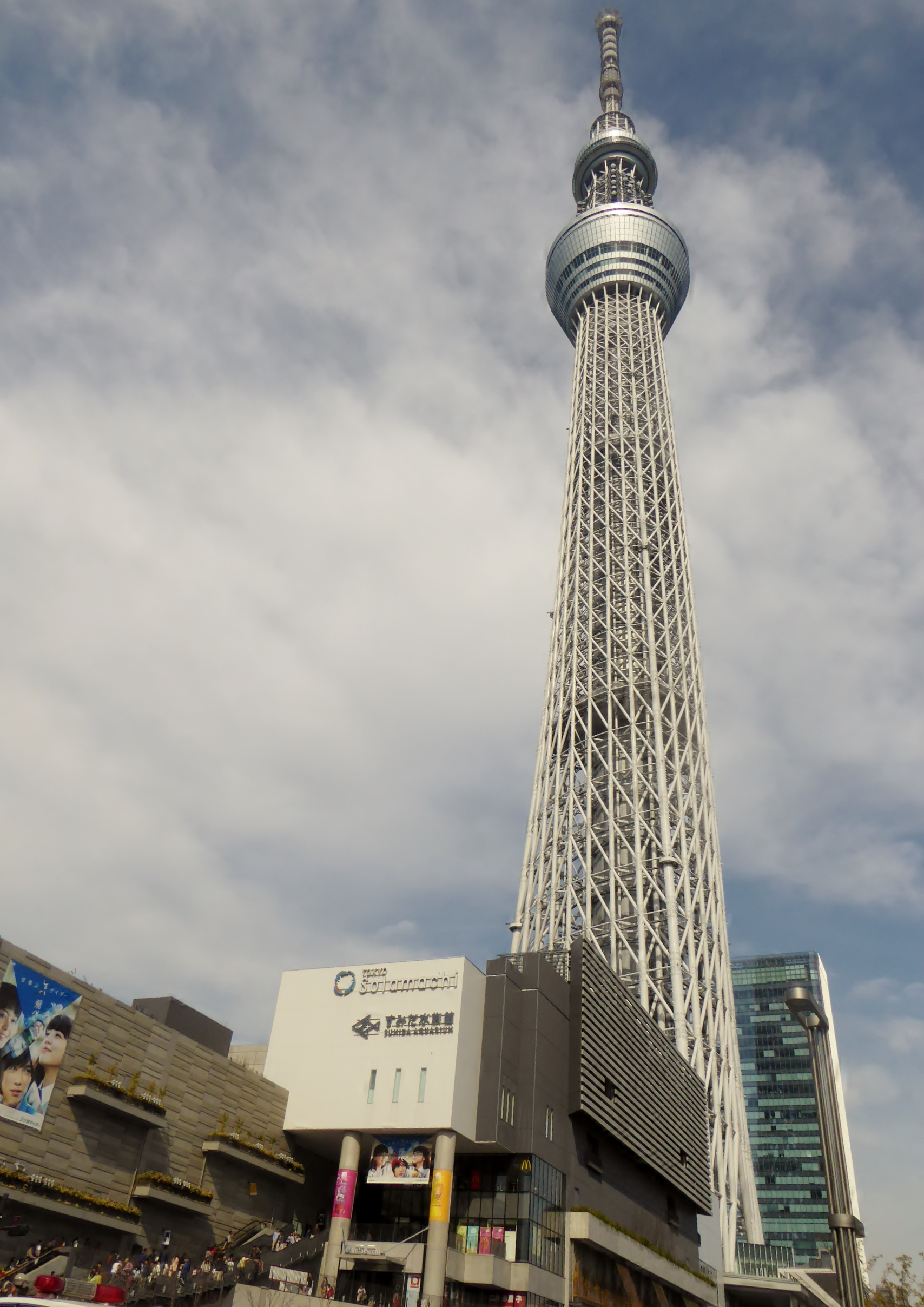
Tokyo Skytree

Since the old MUSE system was not compatible with the new digital standards, Japan developed the ISDB-T in the 2000s for digital terrestrial television, later adopted in other countries in Asia and South America. The first transmission tests using this new generation standard began in 2003 in the metropolitan areas of Tokyo, Osaka and Nagoya. In 2006, the 1seg function was launched, a very popular service that allowed users to watch TV on their mobile phones via digital terrestrial.

From 2010 to 2011 the transition to digital television took place through the digital switchover, the phased switching off on a regional basis of analog television. The transition concluded in most of the country on July 24, 2011, except for the prefectures of Iwate, Miyagi, and Fukushima, on whose switchoff was postponed to the following year due to the Tōhoku earthquake. However, the transition was not without problems: the 333m Tokyo Tower was in fact insufficient to adequately cover the Kantō area with the digital terrestrial signal. For this reason, another 634m high tower was built, the Tokyo Skytree, inaugurated in 2012 in the Sumida ward.

The total digitalization of television in Japan radically changed the traditional radio broadcasting model, leading the main private broadcasters, satellite platforms and telecommunications companies to offer their programs via paid services on the internet. Already in 2008, NHK inaugurated its subscription service NHK On Demand (now known as NHK+) for the online viewing of programs that were previously shown on terrestrial television. In January 2014, Nippon TV launched a free service that allowed viewers to watch programs online up to a week after the original air date. TBS then followed with the launch of a similar service in October 2014. In 2015, to counter the entry of Netflix and Amazon Video into the Japanese market, the main commercial networks based in Tokyo struck a deal by jointly launching the free TVer website. In the IPTV sector the Japanese internet service providers have been offering their customers the opportunity to use TV-related services via the Internet since the early 2000s, but it was thanks to the launch of the acTVila portal in 2007 by a consortium formed by Sony, Panasonic, Sharp, Toshiba and Hitachi that Japan entered the Internet TV market forcefully.

The large-scale diffusion of the Internet has led to the formation of a generation gap in which older people spend more time in front of a television compared to younger people, who spend more time online rather than with any other type of media. Especially among teenagers, video sharing or video on demand services such as Niconico, Yahoo! Douga and GyaO.

On August 31, 2026, a draft has been presented by the Ministry of Internal Affairs and Communications to amend the existing laws for the expansion of the "one station, two channels" policy (applied since 1995 to RBC and QAB in Okinawa) to other stations; the amendment will be implemented in September. The plan seeks to safeguard the commercial television industry in certain regions as the spread of the internet ruined the profits of most stations, as well as a drop in population.

== Terrestrial television ==
There are seven and eight national television networks across Japan – two owned by the national public broadcaster NHK, and six national commercial key stations (the Japanese counterpart of the Big Three like Nippon TV, TV Asahi, and TBS). Although some of the network names shown below are used only for news programming, the applicable organizations also distribute a variety of other programs over most of the same stations.

- Tokyo NHK General TV (東京NHK総合テレビジョン, JOAK)
- Tokyo NHK Educational TV (東京NHK教育テレビジョン, JOAB)
- Tokyo Nippon TV (東京日本テレビ, JOAX)
- Tokyo TBS Television (東京TBSテレビ, JORX)
- Tokyo TV Asahi (東京テレビ朝日, JOEX)
- Tokyo Fuji TV (東京フジテレビ, JOCX)
- TV Tokyo (テレビ東京, JOTX)
- Tokyo MX (JOMX)

=== Private commercial networks ===
Network affiliation name	Number of affiliates	Main station in Tokyo (Kantō)	Secondary station in Osaka and Nagoya (Kansai and Chūbu)		Affiliated newspaper(s)
NNN/NNS	30	NTV	YTV	CTV	Yomiuri
JNN	28	TBS	MBS	CBC TV	Mainichi
ANN	26	EX (TV Asahi)	ABC TV	NBN	Asahi
FNN/FNS	28	CX (Fuji TV)	KTV	THK	Sankei
TXN	6	TX (TV Tokyo)	TVO	TVA	Nikkei
JAITS	13	MX (Tokyo-MX), TVK, CTC, TVS, GYT, GTV	KBS, SUN, BBC, TVN, WTV	GBS, MTV	Chunichi

=== Kantō region ===
Network	Flagship station (Tokyo)	Traded as (Tokyo)	Transmitter area	Broadcast area	Channel (Tokyo)	Type (associated newspaper and film company)
NHK G	NHK (JOAK-DTV)		Tokyo Skytree	Kantō region	1	Public broadcasting (none)
NHK E	NHK (JOAB-DTV)		Tokyo Skytree	Kantō region	2	Public broadcasting (none)
JAITS–SYN	tvk (JOKM-DTV)		Tokyo Skytree	Kantō region	3	Commercial broadcasting (none)
NNS/NNN	Nippon TV (JOAX-DTV)	TYO: 9404	Tokyo Skytree	Kantō region	4	Commercial broadcasting (Yomiuri Shimbun)
ANN	TV Asahi (JOEX-DTV)	TYO: 9409	Tokyo Skytree	Kantō region	5	Commercial broadcasting (The Asahi Shimbun and Toei Company (Note: TV Asahi is the largest single shareholder in Toei.))
JNN	TBS (JORX-DTV)	TYO: 9401	Tokyo Skytree	Kantō region	6	Commercial broadcasting (Mainichi Shimbun)
TXN	TV Tokyo (JOTX-DTV)	TYO: 9413	Tokyo Skytree	Kantō region	7	Commercial broadcasting (The Nikkei)
FNS/FNN	Fuji TV (JOCX-DTV)	TYO: 4676	Tokyo Skytree	Kantō region	8	Commercial broadcasting (Sankei Shimbun (Note: Fuji TV and the Sankei Shimbun are under the common ownership of Fuji Media Holdings.) and Toho (Note: Toho is the largest single shareholder in Fuji TV's parent company Fuji Media Holdings; its parent company, the Hankyu Hanshin Toho Group, is the second largest shareholder in FNS' Kansai region flagship.))
JAITS–SYN	Tokyo MX (JOMX-DTV)		Tokyo Skytree	Tokyo	9	Commercial broadcasting (Chunichi Shimbun (Note: The Chunichi Shimbun Company owns stakes in most JAITS stations.) and Kadokawa Daiei Studio)

=== Tokyo Skytree ===
LCN	Channel number	Channel name	Callsign	Signal power	ERP	Broadcast area
1	27ch	NHK General TV	JOAK-DTV	10 kW	68 kW	Kantō region
2	26ch	NHK Educational TV	JOAB-DTV	10 kW	68 kW	Kantō region
4	25ch	Nippon Television	JOAX-DTV	10 kW	69 kW	Kantō region
5	24ch	TV Asahi	JOEX-DTV	10 kW	69 kW	Kantō region
6	22ch	TBS Television	JORX-DTV	10 kW	69 kW	Kantō region
7	23ch	TV Tokyo	JOTX-DTV	10 kW	69 kW	Kantō region
8	21ch	Fuji Television	JOCX-DTV	10 kW	69 kW	Kantō region
9	16ch	Tokyo MX	JOMX-DTV	3 kW	11.5 kW	Tokyo

== Digital television ==
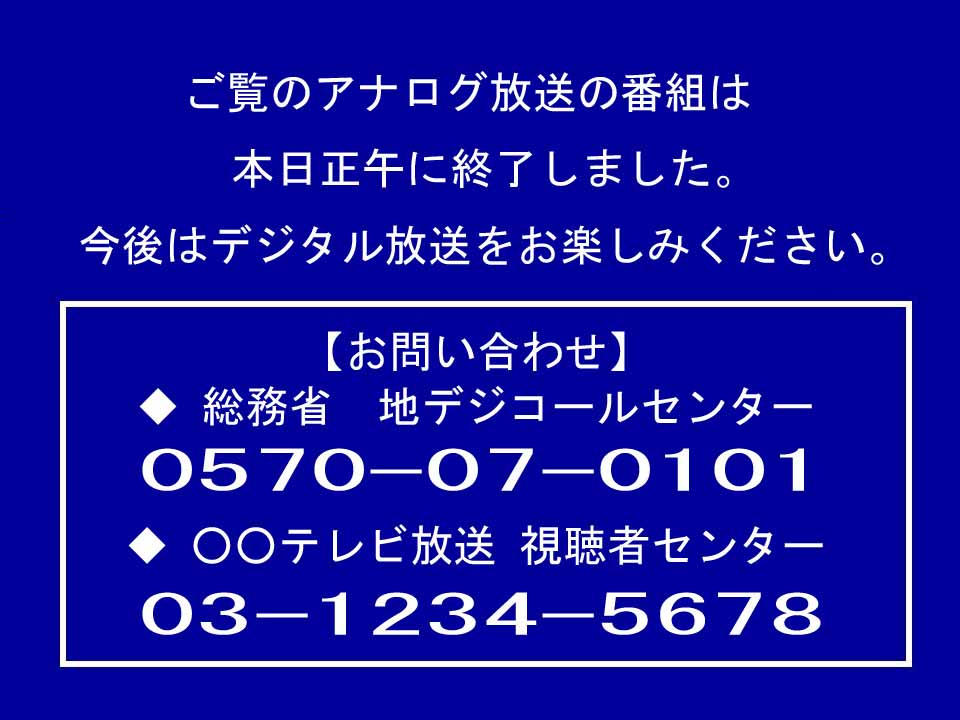
Notice broadcast on television stations across Japan after the cessation of NTSC-J analog broadcasts. Transcript: "The analog broadcast you are watching ended at noon today. Please enjoy digital broadcasting in the future. [Contact] Ministry of Internal Affairs and Communications Terrestrial Digital Call Center 0570-07-0101 ○○○ TV Viewer Center 091-234-5678"

Japan pioneered HDTV for decades with an analog implementation (MUSE/Hi-Vision) in the late 1980s. The old system is not compatible with the new digital standards. Japanese terrestrial broadcasting of HD via ISDB-T started on December 1, 2003, in the Tokyo, Osaka, and Nagoya metropolitan areas. It has been reported that 27 million HD receivers had been sold in Japan as of October 2007.

The Japanese government is studying the implementation of some improvements on the standard as suggested by Brazilian researchers (SBTVD). These new features are unlikely to be adopted in Japan due to incompatibility problems but are being considered for use in future implementations in other countries, including Brazil itself.

Analog terrestrial television broadcasts in Japan were scheduled to end on July 24, 2011, as per the current Japanese broadcasting law. However, the switch-over was delayed in Fukushima, Miyagi, and Iwate prefectures, due to a desire to reduce the inconvenience of those affected most by the 2011 Tōhoku earthquake and tsunami and subsequent Fukushima Daiichi nuclear disaster. In those areas, analog broadcasting ended on March 31, 2012.

== Cable television ==
Cable television was introduced to Japan in 1955, in Shibukawa, Gunma Prefecture. Until the 1980s, cable television in Japan was mainly limited to rural mountainous areas and outlying islands where the reception of terrestrial television was poor. Cable television started to proliferate in urban areas in the late 1980s, beginning with Tokyo, whose first cable television station began broadcasting in 1987.

Only one percent of Japanese households were able to receive cable TV in 1992. This posed issues to the launch of new specialized cable networks.

Following the lifting of legal controls by the Ministry of Posts and Telecommunications, six new cable channels launched on Japan's two communication satellites in mid-1992. Japanese law required new channels to receive half of the revenue from subscribers who received the scrambled signals.

Over one million homes were connected to cable TV in 1995.

As of 1995, Japan's eleven cable-only channels were carried through communication satellites. The most successful channel out of the eleven channels had less than 30,000 subscribers, far fewer than Wowow's 1.6 million subscribers. Programming was mostly limited to sports, news and old movies. The lack of programming and the downfall in the Japanese film industry were primary obstacles for the development of cable networks.

In the mid-1990s, two-way multichannel cable television platforms first appeared in the market; broadband internet services started being bundled to cable television subscriptions in the late 1990s.

Currently, there are several national and regional cable television providers in Japan, the largest being J:COM (a KDDI and Sumitomo Corporation joint-venture) and its subsidiary Japan Cablenet (JCN). These companies currently compete with the Japanese satellite television platforms SKY PerfecTV! and WOWOW, as well as the IPTV platform Hikari TV operated by NTT Plala.

The Japan Cable Television Engineering Association (JCTEA) is the umbrella organisation representing 600 member companies involved in research, designing, manufacturing, installation and maintenance of cable television facilities in Japan.

== Satellite and IP television ==
The medium-scale Broadcasting Satellite for Experimental Purposes (BSE) was planned by Ministry of Posts and Telecommunications (MPT) and developed by the National Space Development Agency of Japan (NASDA) since 1974. After that, the first Japanese experimental broadcasting satellite, called BSE or Yuri, was launched in 1978. NHK started experimental broadcasting of TV program using BS-2a satellite in May 1984.

The satellite BS-2a was launched in preparation for the start of full scale 2-channel broadcasts. Broadcasting Satellite BS-2a was the first national DBS (direct broadcasting satellite), transmitting signals directly into the home of TV viewers. Attitude control of the satellite was conducted using the 3-axial method (zero momentum), and design life was five years. The TV transponder units are designed to sufficiently amplify transmitted signals to enable reception by small, 40 or 60 cm home-use parabolic antennas. The satellite was equipped with three TV transponders (including reserve units). However, one transponder malfunctioned two months after launch (March 23, 1984) and a second transponder malfunctioned three months after launch (May 3, 1984). So, the scheduled satellite broadcasting had to be hastily adjusted to test broadcasting on a single channel.

Later, NHK started regular service (NTSC) and experimental HDTV broadcasting using BS-2b in June 1989. Some Japanese producers of home electronic consumer devices began to deliver TV sets, VCRs and even home acoustic systems equipped with built-in satellite tuners or receivers. Such electronic goods had a specific BS logo.

In April 1991, Wowow, the first commercial satellite channel, began broadcasting using the BS-3 satellite. Unlike the NHK channels, Wowow is a premium channel and requires a subscription to watch.

An estimated two million viewers tuned to NHK's two-channel satellite television broadcasts in 1992.

In 1996, the total number of households that received satellite broadcasting exceeded 10 million.

Digital satellite broadcasting began in 1996 with the launch of PerfecTV (now SKY PerfecTV!), using the European DVB-S system. Free-to-view digital BS broadcasts began on December 1, 2000 using the ISDB-S system, which allowed for multiple HDTV channels and additional uses such as datacasting and satellite radio. Analog satellite broadcasts were discontinued on July 24, 2011 alongside terrestrial broadcasts (the experimental analog HDTV channel was previously shutdown in 2007).

The two satellite systems in use in Japan are BS (broadcast satellite), served by BSAT satellites, and CS (communication satellite), which are served by JCSAT satellites. BS channels are largely free-to-view, but also includes some premium channels that can be subscribed to on an a la carte basis. CS channels are provided by television providers such as SKY PerfecTV!, require a subscription to view (outside of special free trial periods), and consists largely of specialty channels as opposed to the BS channels which are mostly generalist channels.

=== Satellite and IPTV channels ===
==== BS Channels (HD) ====
Channel Number	Channel Name	Description
Current channels
BS101	NHK BS	NHK Extra Programming (HD)
BS141	BS NTV	Nippon TV/NNN Extra Programming (HD)
BS151	BS Asahi	TV Asahi/ANN Extra Programming (HD)
BS161	BS-TBS	TBS/JNN Extra Programming (HD)
BS171	BS TV Tokyo	TV Tokyo/TXN Extra Programming (HD)
BS181	BS Fuji	Fuji Television/FNN Extra Programming (HD)
BS191	WOWOW Prime	General Entertainment (HD)
BS192	WOWOW Live	Sports and Live Performances (HD)
BS193	WOWOW Cinema	Movies (HD)
BS200	BS10	Variety (HD)
BS201	BS10 Premium	Movies (HD)
BS211	BS11	General Entertainment (HD)
BS222	BS12 TwellV	General Entertainment (HD)
BS231	Open University BS	Educational (HD)
BS232	Open University BS	Educational (HD)
BS234	Green Channel	Horse Racing (HD)
BS236	BS Animax	Anime-Focused Programming (HD)
BS242	J Sports 1	Sports (HD)
BS243	J Sports 2	Sports (HD)
BS244	J Sports 3	Sports (HD)
BS245	J Sports 4	Sports (HD)
BS251	BS Tsuri Vision	Fishing (HD)
BS252	WOWOW Plus	WOWOW Special Programming (HD)
BS255	BS Nippon Eiga	Japanese Movies (HD)
BS256	Disney Channel	Disney-Focused Programming (HD)
BS260	J:COM BS	Variety (HD)
BS265	BS Yoshimoto	Yoshimoto-Focused Programming (HD)
BS531	Open University BS Radio	Educational (Radio)

==== BS Channels (4K/8K) ====
Channel Number	Channel Name	Description
4K-BS101	NHK BS Premium 4K	NHK Special Programming (4K)
8K-BS102	NHK BS8K	NHK 8K Test Programming (8K)
4K-BS141	BS NTV 4K	Nippon TV/NNN Extra Programming (4K)
4K-BS151	BS Asahi 4K	TV Asahi/ANN Extra Programming (4K)
4K-BS161	BS-TBS 4K	TBS/JNN Extra Programming (4K)
4K-BS171	BS TV Tokyo 4K	TV Tokyo/TXN Extra Programming (4K)
4K-BS181	BS Fuji 4K	Fuji Television/FNN Extra Programming (4K)
4K-BS211	Shop Channel 4K	Shopping (4K)
4K-BS221	4K QVC	Shopping (4K)

==== CS Channels (SKY PerfecTV!/Hikari TV, HD) ====
Channel Number	Channel Name	Description
CS055	Shop Channel	Shopping (HD)
CS161	QVC	Shopping (HD)
CS218	Toei Channel	Toei Movies and Television Programs (HD)
CS219	Eisei Gekijo	Shochiku Movies, Kabuki and Asian Drama (HD)
CS223	Movie Channel NECO	Movies (HD)
CS227	The Cinema	Movies (HD)
CS240	Movie Plus	Movies (HD)
CS250	Sky A	Sports (HD)
CS254	Gaora Sports	Sports (HD)
CS257	NTV G+	Yomuri Giants-focused Sports network (HD)
CS262	Golf Network	Golf (HD)
CS290	Takarazuka Sky Stage	Takarazuka Revue's Theatre (HD)
CS292	Jidaigeki Senmon Channel	Jidaigeki (HD)
CS293	Family Gekijo	Variety (HD)
CS295	MONDO TV	Variety (HD)
CS296	TBS Channel 1	General Entertainment (HD)
CS297	TBS Channel 2	General Entertainment (HD)
CS298	TV Asahi Channel 1	General Entertainment (HD)
CS299	TV Asahi Channel 2	General Entertainment (HD)
CS300	NTV Plus	General Entertainment (HD)
CS301	Mētele NEXT	General Entertainment (HD)
CS305	Channel Ginga	General Entertainment (HD)
CS307	Fuji TV One	Sports and Variety (HD)
CS308	Fuji TV Two	Sports, Drama and Animation (HD)
CS309	Fuji TV Next	Sports and Music Live (HD)
CS310	V Paradise	Direct-to-video movies (HD)
CS312	Dlife	General Entertainment (HD)
CS314	Lala TV	Women's Programming (HD)
CS317	KBS World	Korean Entertainment (HD)
CS318	Mnet Japan	Korean Music and Entertainment (HD)
CS21	Music Japan TV	Music (HD)
CS322	Space Shower TV	Music (HD)
CS323	MTV Japan	Music (HD)
CS325	Music On! TV	Music (HD)
CS330	Kids Station	Animation and Children's Programming (HD)
CS333	AT-X	Anime-focused programming (HD)
CS339	Disney Jr.	Family (HD)
CS342	History Channel	History (HD)
CS343	National Geographic	Documentary (HD)
CS349	NTV News 24	News (HD)
CS351	TBS News	News (HD)
CS566	CNNj	News (HD)
CS567	CNN U.S.	News (HD)
CS570	Nikkei CNBC	Business News (HD)
CS800	Sports Live+	Sports (HD)
CS801	Sukachan 1	Sports (HD)

==== CS Channels (SKY PerfecTV!/Hikari TV, 4K) ====
SKY PerfecTV! used to broadcast 4K channels on its basic CS service, but all 4K channels have ended broadcasting as of March 2025.

== Channels from Asian neighbors ==
The systems used are incompatible with Japan's ISDB-T.

Channel	Owner	Language	Transmission	Country/Region	Receiving prefecture(s)
Channel One	National Media Group	Russian	DVB-T	Russia	Hokkaido (Wakkanai, Nemuro)
Russia-1	VGTRK	Russian	DVB-T	Russia	Hokkaido (Wakkanai, Nemuro)
Match TV	Gazprom Media	Russian	DVB-T	Russia	Hokkaido (Wakkanai, Nemuro)
NTV	Gazprom Media	Russian	DVB-T	Russia	Hokkaido (Wakkanai, Nemuro)
Channel Five	National Media Group	Russian	DVB-T	Russia	Hokkaido (Wakkanai, Nemuro)
Russia-K	VGTRK	Russian	DVB-T	Russia	Hokkaido (Wakkanai, Nemuro)
Russia-24	VGTRK	Russian	DVB-T	Russia	Hokkaido (Wakkanai, Nemuro)
Carousel	National Media Group, VGTRK	Russian	DVB-T	Russia	Hokkaido (Wakkanai, Nemuro)
OTR	Russian Government	Russian	DVB-T	Russia	Hokkaido (Wakkanai, Nemuro)
TV Center	Moscow Government	Russian	DVB-T	Russia	Hokkaido (Wakkanai, Nemuro)
REN TV	National Media Group	Russian	DVB-T	Russia	Hokkaido (Wakkanai, Nemuro)
Spas	Moscow Patriarchate	Russian	DVB-T	Russia	Hokkaido (Wakkanai, Nemuro)
STS	CTC Media	Russian	DVB-T	Russia	Hokkaido (Wakkanai, Nemuro)
Domashniy	CTC Media	Russian	DVB-T	Russia	Hokkaido (Wakkanai, Nemuro)
TV-3	Gazprom Media	Russian	DVB-T	Russia	Hokkaido (Wakkanai, Nemuro)
Pyatnitsa!	Gazprom Media	Russian	DVB-T	Russia	Hokkaido (Wakkanai, Nemuro)
Zvezda	Zvezda Armed Forces Teleradio Company	Russian	DVB-T	Russia	Hokkaido (Wakkanai, Nemuro)
Mir	International Radio and Television Company "MIR"	Russian	DVB-T	Russia	Hokkaido (Wakkanai, Nemuro)
TNT	Gazprom Media	Russian	DVB-T	Russia	Hokkaido (Wakkanai, Nemuro)
Muz-TV	UTH Russia	Russian	DVB-T	Russia	Hokkaido (Wakkanai, Nemuro)
KBS1	Korean Broadcasting System	Korean	ATSC	South Korea	Nagasaki (Tsushima)
KBS2	Korean Broadcasting System	Korean	ATSC	South Korea	Nagasaki (Tsushima)
MBC TV	Munhwa Broadcasting Corporation	Korean	ATSC	South Korea	Nagasaki (Tsushima)
SBS TV	Nexen Tire, Seoul Broadcasting System	Korean	ATSC	South Korea	Nagasaki (Tsushima)
EBS1	Educational Broadcasting System	Korean	ATSC	South Korea	Nagasaki (Tsushima)
EBS2	Educational Broadcasting System	Korean	ATSC	South Korea	Nagasaki (Tsushima)
CTV Main Channel	China Television	Mandarin, Hokkien	DVB-T	Taiwan	Okinawa (Yonaguni)
CTV News Channel	China Television	Mandarin, Hokkien	DVB-T	Taiwan	Okinawa (Yonaguni)
CTV Classic	China Television	Mandarin, Hokkien	DVB-T	Taiwan	Okinawa (Yonaguni)
CTV Bravo	China Television	Mandarin, Hokkien	DVB-T	Taiwan	Okinawa (Yonaguni)
PTS Main Channel	Public Television Service	Mandarin, Hokkien	DVB-T	Taiwan	Okinawa (Yonaguni)
PTS Taigi	Public Television Service	Mandarin, Hokkien	DVB-T	Taiwan	Okinawa (Yonaguni)
TaiwanPlus	Public Television Service	English	DVB-T	Taiwan	Okinawa (Yonaguni)
FTV Main Channel	Formosa Television	Mandarin, Hokkien	DVB-T	Taiwan	Okinawa (Yonaguni)
FTV One	Formosa Television	Mandarin, Hokkien	DVB-T	Taiwan	Okinawa (Yonaguni)
FTV News Channel	Formosa Television	Mandarin, Hokkien	DVB-T	Taiwan	Okinawa (Yonaguni)
FTV Taiwan	Formosa Television	Mandarin, Hokkien	DVB-T	Taiwan	Okinawa (Yonaguni)
PTS XS	Public Television Service	Mandarin	DVB-T	Taiwan	Okinawa (Yonaguni)
Hakka TV	Hakka Television	Hakka	DVB-T	Taiwan	Okinawa (Yonaguni)
TITV	Taiwan Indigenous Television	Atayal, Amis, Bunun, Paiwan, Yami	DVB-T	Taiwan	Okinawa (Yonaguni)
TTV Main Channel	Taiwan Television	Mandarin, Hokkien	DVB-T	Taiwan	Okinawa (Yonaguni)
TTV News Channel	Taiwan Television	Mandarin, Hokkien	DVB-T	Taiwan	Okinawa (Yonaguni)
TTV Finance	Taiwan Television	Mandarin, Hokkien	DVB-T	Taiwan	Okinawa (Yonaguni)
TTV Variety	Taiwan Television	Mandarin, Hokkien	DVB-T	Taiwan	Okinawa (Yonaguni)
CTS Main Channel	Chinese Television System	Mandarin, Hokkien	DVB-T	Taiwan	Okinawa (Yonaguni)
CTS Education, Sports and Culture	Chinese Television System	Mandarin, Hokkien	DVB-T	Taiwan	Okinawa (Yonaguni)
CTS News and Information Channel	Chinese Television System	Mandarin, Hokkien	DVB-T	Taiwan	Okinawa (Yonaguni)
Congress Channel 1 and 2	Chinese Television System	Mandarin, Hokkien	DVB-T	Taiwan	Okinawa (Yonaguni)

== Programs ==
While TV programs vary from station to station, some generalizations can be made. Most commercial television stations sign on between the hours of 4:00 a.m. and 5:00 a.m. every morning. Early morning hours are dominated by news programs, and these run from around 9:00 to 9:30 a.m. They are then replaced by late morning shows that target wives who have finished their housework. These run to around 1:30 p.m., at which time reruns of dramas and information programs that target the same age group start. On some stations at 4:00 p.m., the young kid-oriented anime and TV shows start, and end around 7:00 p.m. or 8:00 p.m. Evening news programs air as early as before 4:00 p.m. or before 5:00 p.m. and end at 7:00 p.m., when the "Golden Hour" of TV shows start. 7:00 p.m. to 9:00 p.m. are the time periods into which TV stations pour the most resources. Appearing in this time slot is a certain sign that an actor or actress is a TV star. After 9:00 they switch over to Japanese television dramas and programs focusing on older age groups, which run until 10:00 or 11:00 p.m. Stations run their late night news mostly at the 11:00 p.m. hour, and around midnight sports news programs run which target working ages. After these, programs for mature audiences run as well as anime that do not expect enough viewers if they were run earlier. Some commercial stations sign off between 2:00 a.m. and 3:00 a.m. every night; however, most stations affiliated with NNS or JNN broadcast 24 hours a day, with the sign off window replaced by a simulcast of their networks' news channel during the overnight hours. Other stations do filler programming to fill time before the start of early morning news. Commercial stations sometimes sign off on Sunday late nights or other days for technical maintenance. NHK is required to broadcast 24 hours a day, seven days a week.

Advertisers sponsor programs rather than buying advertising time during commercial breaks. The advertisers have major power over prime time programs, aiming to the lowest common denominator by having "familiar, tested" celebrities hosting the programs, regardless of genre.

None of the foreign programs air on terrestrial television during prime time, even rare outside the prime time hours; instead, locally produced programs dominate the slot, favored by the public. The broadcasters have control over production companies, hence production companies often work with a single TV station and the TV station itself owns the copyright to the completed program.

The Japanese have sometimes subdivided television series and dramas into kūru (クール), from the French term "cours" (both singular and plural) for "course", which is a three-month period usually of 13 episodes. Each kūru generally has its own opening and ending image sequence and song, recordings of which are often sold. A six-month period of 26 episodes is also used for subdivision in some television series.

=== Drama ===
Japanese dramas (テレビドラマ, terebi dorama; television drama) are a staple of Japanese television and are broadcast daily. All major TV networks in Japan produce a variety of drama series including romance, comedies, detective stories, horror, and many others. With a theme, there may be a one-episode drama, or two nights, that may be aired on special occasions, such as in 2007 where they had a drama produced as a sixty-year anniversary from the end of the World War II, with a theme of the atomic bomb.

=== Science fiction ===
Japan has a long history of producing science fiction series for TV. Non-anime science fiction are still largely unknown to foreign audiences. An exception is Power Rangers and their subsequent series that used battle sequences from the Super Sentai counterpart and combined them with American actors who acted out entirely original story lines.

=== Anime ===
Anime (アニメ), taken from half of the Japanese pronunciation of "animation", is the Japanese word for animation in general, but is used more specifically to mean "Japanese animation" in the rest of the world. Anime dates from about 1917. TV networks regularly broadcast anime programming. In Japan, major national TV networks, such as TV Tokyo broadcast anime regularly. Smaller regional stations broadcast anime on UHF. While many popular series air during the daytime and evening hours, most air only at night from 12:00 a.m. to 4:00 a.m. These series usually make profits primarily through BD (Blu-ray Disc)/DVD sales and merchandising rather than through television advertising. Some anime series are original, but most are intended to promote something else, such as an ongoing manga, light novel, or video game series which they are usually based on.

=== Variety shows ===
Japanese variety shows (also known as Japanese game shows) are television entertainment made up of a variety of original stunts, musical performances, comedy skits, quiz contests, and other acts. Japanese television programs such as Music Station continue in an almost pristine format from the same variety shows of years before. The only major changes have been the increasing disappearance of live backup music since the 1980s.

== Most viewed channels ==
06:00–24:00 JST

Position	Channel	Rating, 2023 (%)	Rating, 2022 (%)
1	Nippon TV	3.5	3.6
2	TV Asahi	3.5	3.6
3	NHK G	2.9	2.9
4	TBS	2.7	2.8
5	Fuji TV	2.3	2.4
6	TV Tokyo	1.2	1.2

== See also ==
- Hobankyo—Organization based in Japan that enforces broadcast television copyright issues
- List of Japanese-language television channels
- NHK
- Video Research—company which conducts audience measurement for television and radio
- The staff ate it later
