= Television Kanagawa =

JOKM-DTV
- Logo used since 2004

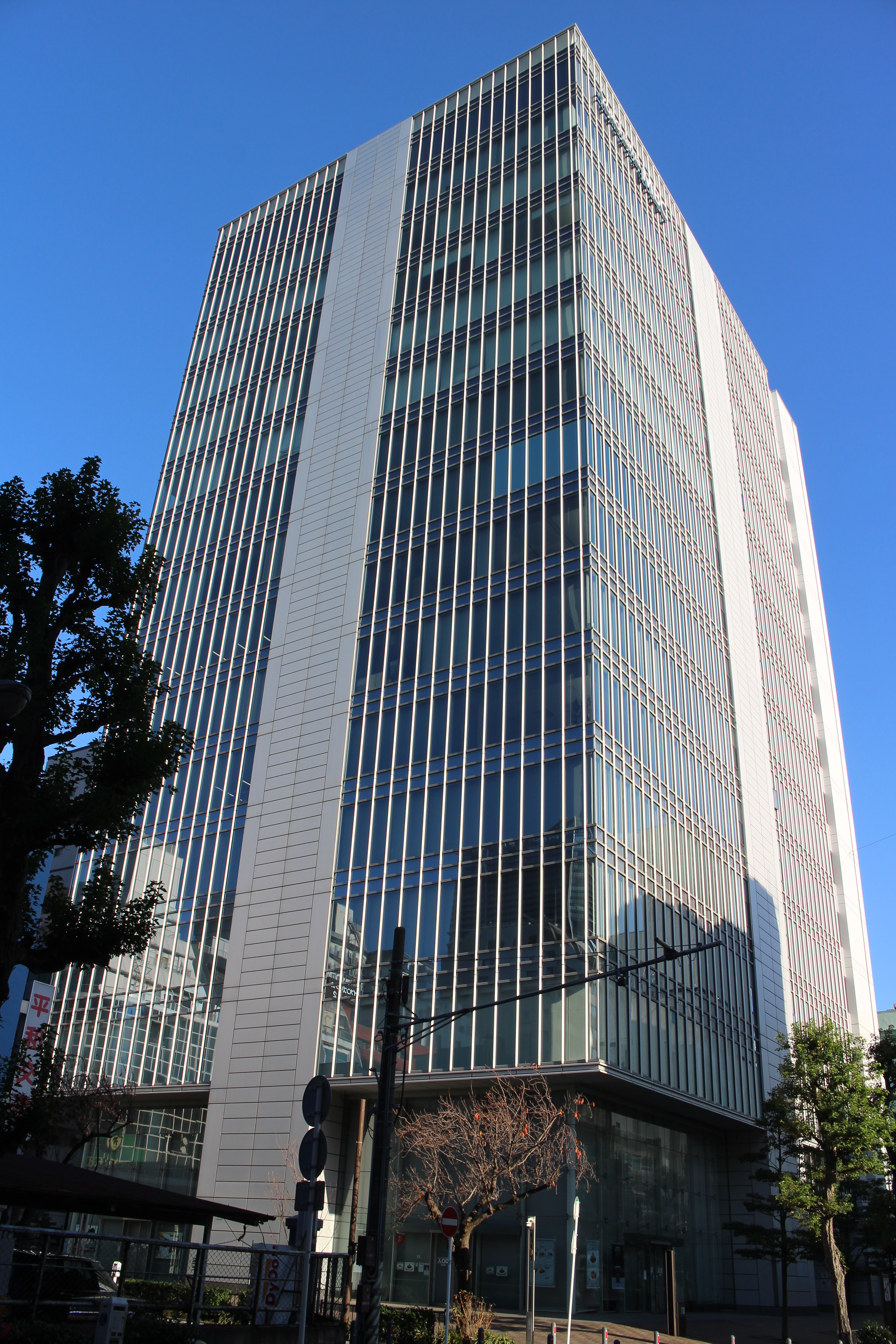
- Headquarters in Naka-ku, Yokohama
- Kanagawa Prefecture; Japan
- City: Yokohama
- Channels: Digital: 18 (UHF); Virtual: 3
- Branding: TV Kanagawa tvk

Programming
- Language: Japanese
- Affiliations: Independent (member of JAITS)

Ownership
- Owner: Television Kanagawa, Inc.

History
- First air date: April 1, 1972
- Former call signs: JOKM-TV (1972–2011)
- Former channel numbers: Analog: 42 (UHF, 1972–2011)
- Call sign meaning: JO; Kanagawa; Media

Technical information
- Licensing authority: MIC
- ERP: 1 kW

Links
- Website: www.tvk-yokohama.com

Corporate information
- Company
- Native name: 株式会社テレビ神奈川
- Romanized name: Kabushikigaisha Terebikanagawa
- Type: Kabushiki gaisha
- Industry: Television broadcasting
- Founded: April 20, 1971; 55 years ago
- Headquarters: 2-23 Otamachi, Naka-ku, Yokohama City, Kanagawa Prefecture, Japan
- Key people: Yoshikazu Kumagai (President)
- Footnotes; Data from its Corporate Profile

Television Kanagawa (テレビ神奈川, Terebi Kanagawa) (tvk for short) is an independent television station in Japan serving Kanagawa Prefecture. The station was founded on April 20, 1971 and began broadcasting on April 1, 1972. Its call sign is JOKM-DTV (JOKM-TV during the analog broadcasting period) and occupies the UHF channel 18 on the airwaves.

The station is a member of the Japanese Association of Independent Television Stations.

== History ==
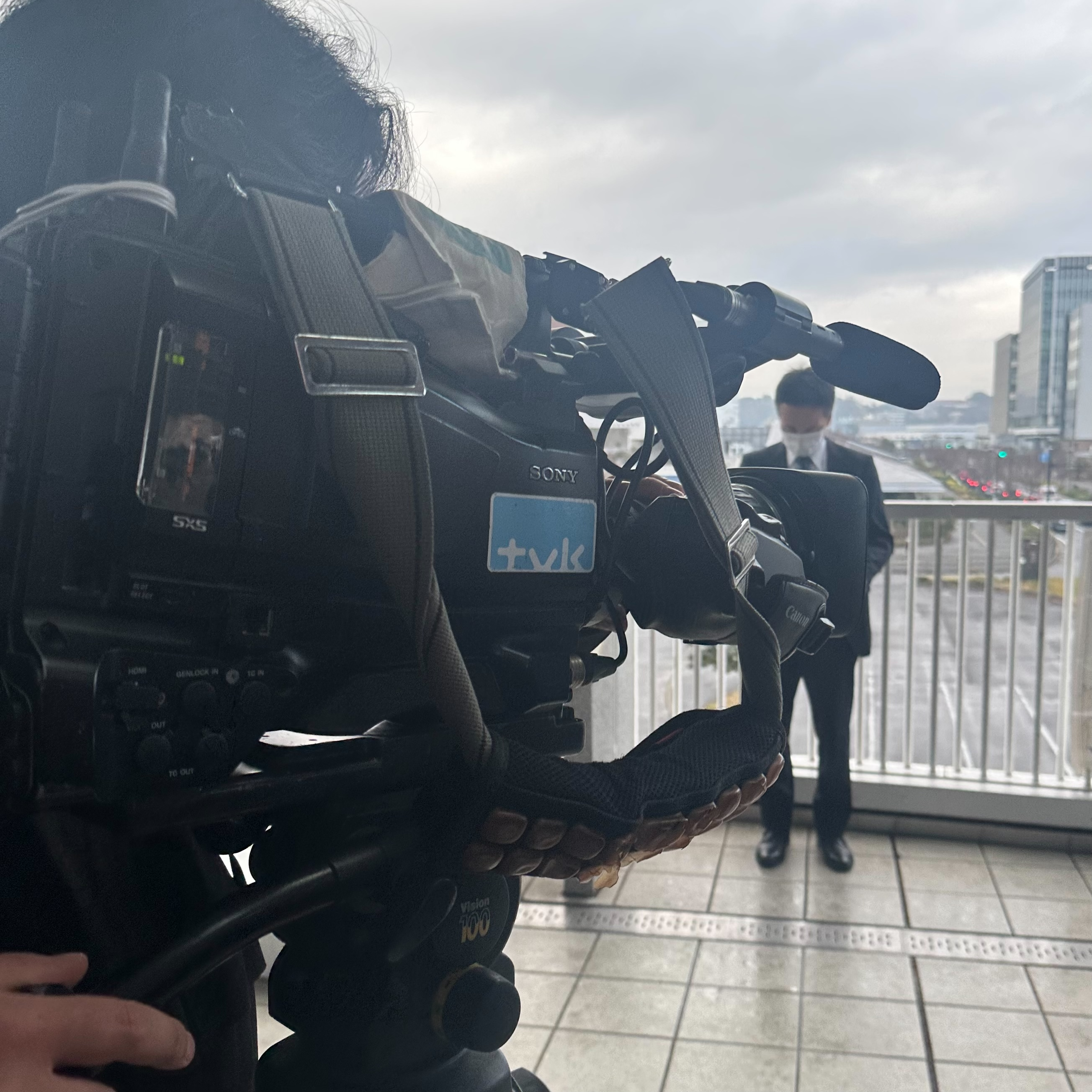
A Television Kanagawa camera filming an on location shoot.

Although there were already five main broadcasters in the Kanto region in the late 1960s, they actually lacked information on what was happening outside the Tokyo Prefecture. Therefore, prefectures in the Kanto region became involved in opening TV stations covering solely their prefectures. In 1969, the Ministry of Posts would issue UHF TV licenses for the six Kanto prefectures. Immediately, 12 companies in Kanagawa Prefecture were interested for operating a TV station. With the support of the prefectural government, these 12 bids merged to form Television Kanagawa on November 6, 1970, and obtained a preliminary broadcasting license on November 27. On April 15, 1971, it held its founding general meeting and was officially established on April 20, when it was registered as a company and issued a million shares.

During preparations for its launch, Nippon Television and NET Television (now TV Asahi) sent staff to provide support. At the same time, it dispatched staff from Sun Television for training. To solve the problem where old television sets could not receive UHF signals, TVK distributed 50,000 UHF antennas free of charge to interested households. The test signal was activated on February 5, 1972, at 2pm, followed by test programs on March 5 at 12pm. At 9:30am (JST) on April 1, 1972, TVK started broadcasting on UHF channel 42, becoming the 36th UHF commercial television station to launch in Japan (84th overall). Its launching program was Habatake TVK (はばたけTVK). Initially, the channel mainly aired educational programs in the morning and feature films in the afternoon and in the evening. TVK's launch target audience consisted largely of people who owned a second television set and largely aired youth-oriented programs during the evening, in order to distance it from the main stations.

As of November 1973, TVK's penetration covered 92% of Kanagawa Prefecture. However, since it was difficult to sustain itself only with television advertising, it began to diversify its assets. That same month (November 1973), it opened TVK Housing Plaza Hiratsuka, beginning its operation in the real estate sector. On July 27, 1974, it opened TVK Housing Plaza Yokohama (TVKハウジングプラザ横浜), putting the housing assets as part of its business. In 1975, TVK's own programs occupied 45% of the total line-up. To celebrate its fourth anniversary in 1976, it held a 25-hour telethon, totalling 20 million yen in donations. However, TVK's operational status remained critical, and it even faced a deficit of over 100 million yen that same year. To counter that, it launched a campaign to lure advertisers to the station and obtained a profit of 16.4 million yen in 1977. After that, the amount of local programs increased and TVK struck more profits over time.

In 1980, TVK teamed up with the three other UHF stations in Kanto (Chiba Television Broadcasting, Television Saitama and Gunma Television), with the four stations beginning to share certain programs in certain timeslots. However, due to a financial crisis, TVK faced its first deficit in three years. In 1981, it launched the adult program The Adult (ジ・アダルト), but ended quickly due to the lack of movies to air. That same year, it aired a special documentary coinciding with its tenth anniversary, The Distant Crossroads of Civilization (文明の遥かな十字路), which was sold successfully to other TV stations. However, this did not improve its financial situation.

Facing a grave financial situation, 1982 was designed as "the first year of TVK's reconstruction" and would completely strengthen its commercial operations. In 1983, thanks to the increase of its advertising revenue and of its sports and music programs, TVK obtained the largest profit since its launch. From October 1984, the daily opening time moved one hour earlier, from 9:30am to 8:30am. In fiscal 1989, TVK's profits reached 7.85118 billion yen, surpassing the one billion mark for the first time. Net profits hit 415.6 million yen, allowing it to erase its accumulated deficits since launch. In April 1990, TVK moved its opening time to 7:30am. Morning programming changed from educational content to mainly original programming. That same year, its revenue surpassed 8.5 billion yen. In 1991, TVK began issuing dividends to shareholders, at the cost of 30 yen a share.

However, in 1995, with the fall of the bubble economy, as well as a drop in revenue for promotional considerations paid by the prefectural government, TVK suffered a deficit for the first time in thirteen years. Although the station earned a profit in 1996, it suffered deficits for three years in a row starting in 1997. The company returned to profits in 2000. To cover the costs for the conversion to digital terrestrial television, TVK increased its capital from 880 million yen to 1.151,825 billion yen in 2001. This later increased to 3,6 billion yen in 2003 and issued five million new shares. At the same time, in order to control program production costs and expanding advertising sales, TVK strengthened its co-productions with other JAITS stations. In April 2003, it set up Shutoken Net4 with Tokyo MX, TVS and CTC and established a daily news service sharing their resources.

== See also ==
- Japanese Association of Independent Television Stations
- UHF anime
