= Tokyo MX =

Independent TV station in Tokyo, Japan

Coordinates: 35°41′5″N 139°44′38″E

Tokyo Metropolitan Television Broadcasting Corporation
- Logo used since 2006

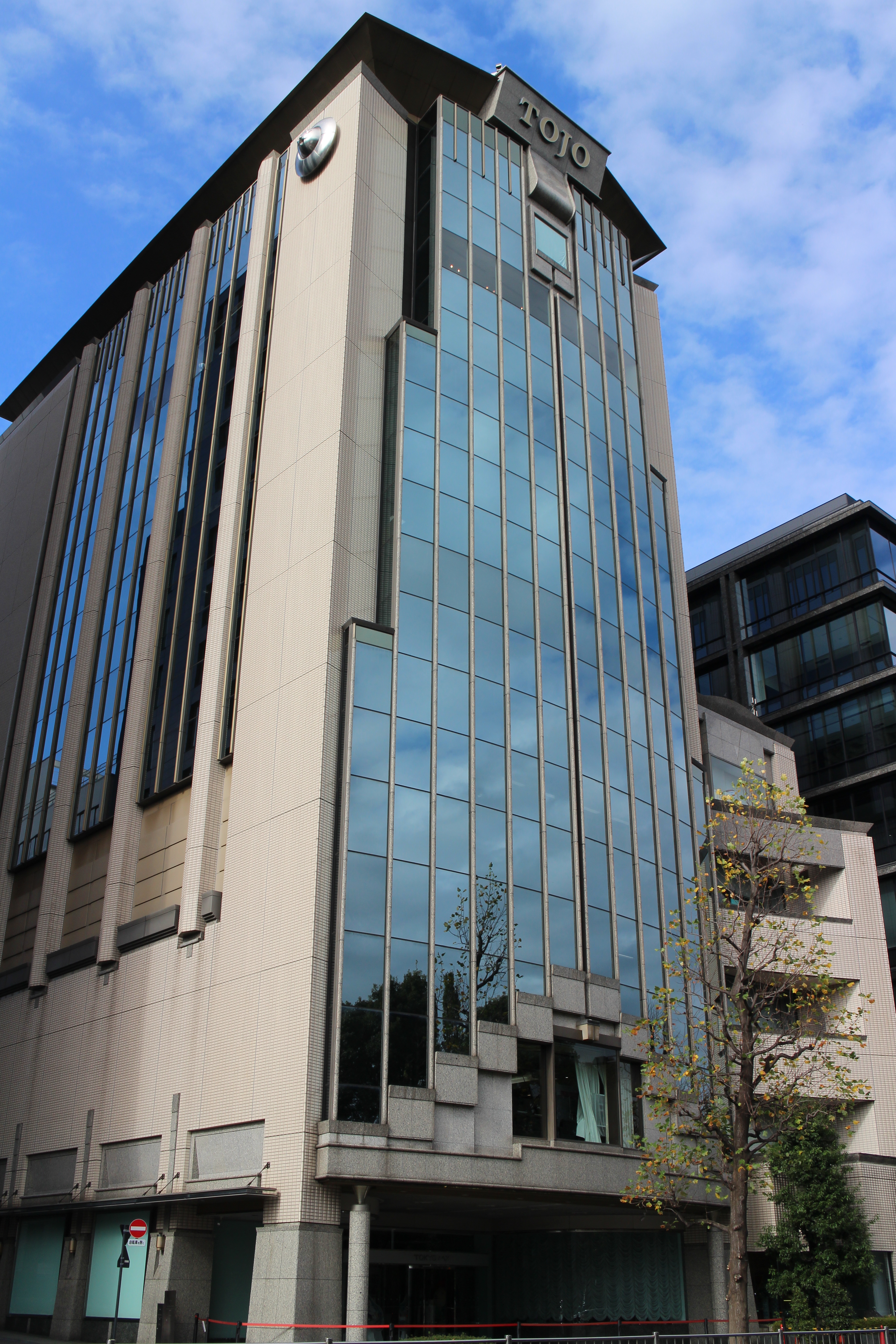
- Headquarters in Chiyoda, Tokyo
- Trade name: Tokyo MX
- Native name: 東京メトロポリタンテレビジョン株式会社
- Romanized name: Tōkyō metoroporitanterebijon kabushikigaisha
- Type: Private KK
- Founded: April 30, 1993; 33 years ago
- Headquarters: Kōjimachi, Chiyoda, Tokyo, Japan
- Owner: Tokyo FM (10.06%); Bushiroad (10.06%); Chunichi Shimbun (6.28%); Tokyo Metropolitan Government (3.51%); Kajima (3.51%); Toppan (3.51%); Tokyo Dome (3.51%); Toei Company (3.51%); NEC (3.51%); NTT Communications (2.96%); Kadokawa Corporation (2.14%)
- Website: s.mxtv.jp

JOMX-DTV
- Tokyo; Japan
- Channels: Digital: 16 (UHF); Virtual: 9
- Branding: Tokyo MX

Programming
- Language: Japanese
- Affiliations: Independent (member of JAITS)

Ownership
- Owner: Tokyo Metropolitan Television Broadcasting Corporation

History
- First air date: November 1, 1995
- Former call signs: JOMX-TV (1995–2011)
- Former names: MX Television (1995-2000); Tokyo MX Television (2000-2006)
- Former channel numbers: Analog: 14 (UHF, 1995–2011); Digital: 20 (UHF, 2003–2013)
- Call sign meaning: Metropolitan; X (sequentially assigned)

Technical information
- Licensing authority: MIC
- ERP: 3 kW (11.5 kW ERP)

JOMX-DTV (channel 9), branded as Tokyo MX (officially stylized as TOKYO MX), is an independent television station in Tokyo, Japan, owned by the Tokyo Metropolitan Television Broadcasting Corporation (Note: 東京メトロポリタンテレビジョン株式会社, Tōkyō Metoroporitan Terebijon kabushiki gaisha). It is the only television station that exclusively serves the city and parts of nearby prefectures in the Kantō region. It competes with Big Six Networks in the Kanto region (NHK General TV, NHK Educational TV, Nippon TV, TV Asahi, TBS TV, TV Tokyo, and Fuji TV), all of which are flagship stations of national networks. Tokyo MX was founded on April 30, 1993, and broadcasts commenced on November 1, 1995. Shareholders include the Tokyo Metropolitan Government, Tokyo FM Broadcasting, and others. (MXTV is an associate company of Tokyo FM.)

Every week, Tokyo MX airs the press conferences of the Governor of Tokyo. It is a member of the Japanese Association of Independent Television Stations (JAITS).

== History ==
Although Tokyo is at the center of Japan's media industry, the proliferation of independent television stations in the Kanto region excluded the prefecture. In 1985, governor Shunichi Suzuki requested a UHF frequency for a television station limited to Tokyo. On January 30, 1991, the Ministry of Internal Affairs and Communications granted the UHF channel 14 allocation for Tokyo. The Tokyo Metropolitan Government, as well as the Tokyo Chamber of Commerce and Industry, revealed their license bid, with 159 candidates.

On April 30, 1993, a group led by former Dai-Ichi Kangyo Bank (now Mizuho Bank) employee Tetsuo Fujimori founded the Tokyo Metropolitan Television Broadcasting Corporation (TMT, later MX) to construct the sixth commercial television station that would be licensed to Tokyo. Test transmissions began in April 1995. The station received its license on October 13, 1995, and began test transmissions two days later under the name MX-TV. MX-TV signed on the air on November 1, 1995, at 4:00 JST with a 14-hour long introductory program entitled "Countdown MX Television" (カウントダウンMXテレビ, Kauntodaun MX Terebi); regular broadcast commenced at 18:00 JST that same day.

The station's first executive producer was Yoshihiko Muraki, a former producer at TV Man Union, a production company affiliated with TBS. Inspired by the New York-based TV channels NY1 and WPIX, Muraki wanted to differentiate the station from its longer established competitors by dedicating 12 hours of programming daily to rolling news, and the rest to alternative programming focusing on the Tokyo region. The news programming, under the name Tokyo News (東京NEWS), revolutionised Japanese TV news by introducing the concept of video journalism, in which the station's journalists recorded, produced, and edited their stories, alongside reporting on them. These 12 hours of news were divided into 5 daily blocks: morning, noon, evening, night, and overnight. It also offered reports live from the Metropolitan Police Department, the Tokyo Metropolitan Government Building, and the Telecom Center building, where the station's original headquarters were housed. In April 1996, the station installed a transmitter in the Ogasawara Islands, which are under the prefecture's jurisdiction.

The station suffered in its first years for a poor signal and heavy management disputes. Some of the shareholders lacked any kind of TV broadcasting experience, and scandals arose over the operation and shareholding structure of the broadcaster. Additionally, its analog signal from Tokyo Tower did not cover the entire region, with its signal being poor in the eastern-most parts of the city. As the struggles continued, Muraki resigned in June 1996, and station VP and General Manager Kazuo Kinumura was dismissed that following August. In September, the station's Programming Committee resigned. Shortly thereafter, and in the wake of the Asian financial crisis, the station began to suffer from serious economic problems.

The crisis began to be sorted by June 1997, after FM Tokyo stepped up and bought a controlling stake in the broadcaster. As part of the transaction, FM Tokyo's president Wataru Goto and Odakyu Electric Railway chairman Tsutomu Shimizu were appointed as president and vice president. Goto and Shimizu decided to drop the ambitious news format and reposition the channel as a more generalist broadcaster with a strong local focus. Although news programming was retained, albeit in a reduced form and in a more traditional format, the station began adding more entertainment programming, including locally oriented variety shows and coverage of local sports, as well as late-night anime, and infomercials during off-peak timeslots. This improved the station's ratings and finances, and the company became profitable by 2002.

The service was relayed nationwide as part of the now-defunct DirecTV service from April 1998 to September 2000, when its services ended.

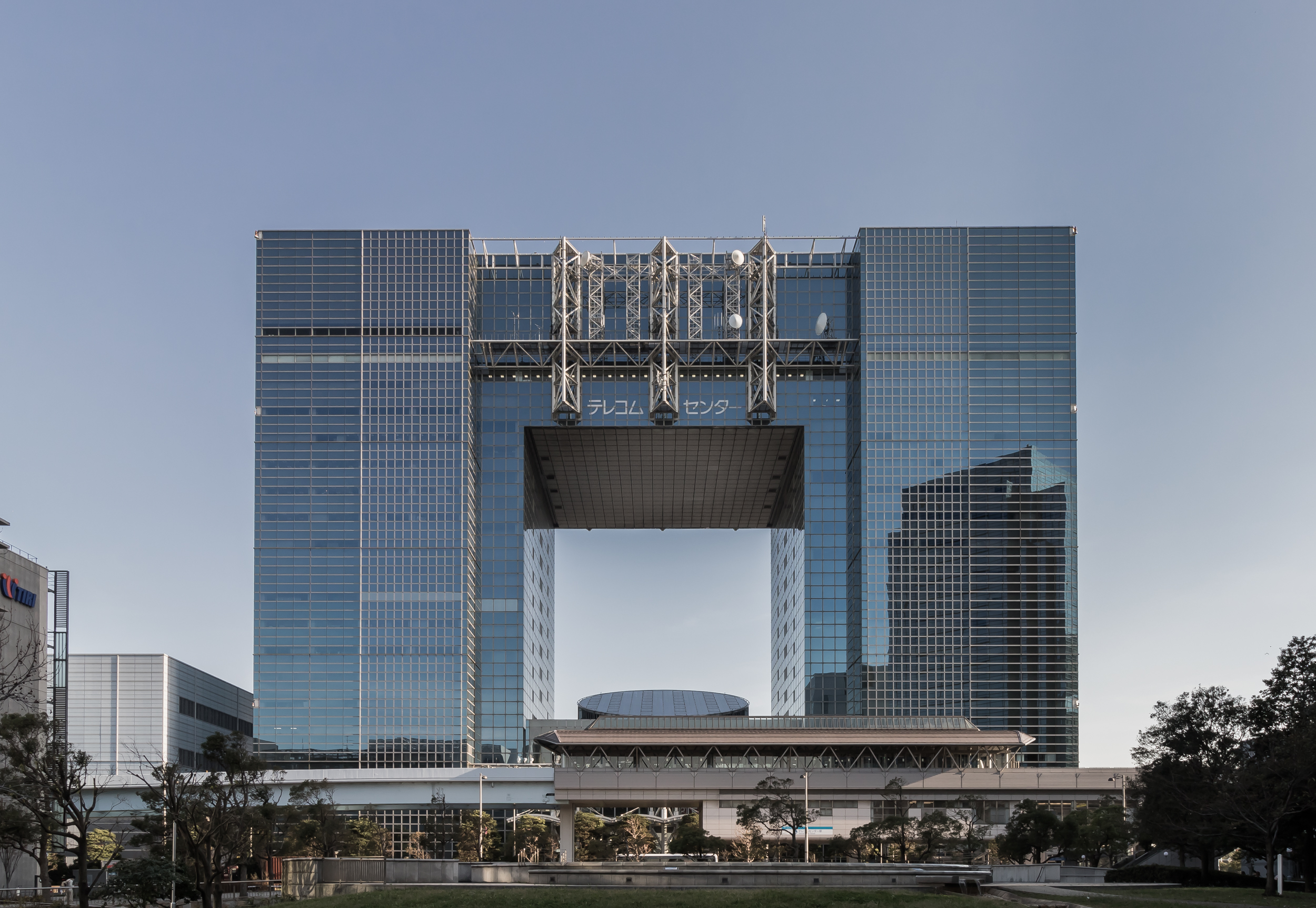
Tokyo Metropolitan Television old headquarters (1995–2006): Telecom Center Building

On December 12, 2000, MX-TV was rebranded as Tokyo MX Television (東京MXテレビ, Tōkyō MX Terebi). The station commenced its digital terrestrial television signal on December 1, 2003, and would rebrand as Tokyo MX in July 2006, after moving its studios and headquarters to its current location in the Chiyoda ward. These moves would ultimately hamper, once again, the station's finances, but the launch of digital terrestrial broadcasts would allow the station's signal to be in a par with its competitors and allowing more viewers to see their programming. Ultimately, the station would recover from these financial difficulties from the Great Recession by 2011.

Tokyo MX shut down its analog broadcasts on July 24, 2011. It launched transmissions from the Tokyo Skytree on August 27, 2012, increasing their broadcasting footprint to cover the immediate outskirts of Tokyo city; the station also established a street-side studio in the building where variety programmes are broadcast. As a result of this, Tokyo MX stopped broadcasting its signal from the Tokyo Tower on May 12, 2013.

A second channel, Tokyo MX2, began broadcasting in April 2014. The channel operates on the second sub-channel of Tokyo MX1 and is primarily dedicated to alternative programming.

=== Anime on Tokyo MX ===
Tokyo MX is known to air most late-night anime. Previously, the station only aired anime classics such as Heidi, Girl of the Alps and Touch. When the affiliate stations of major Japanese networks serving the Kantō region started airing less late-night anime in 2006, the station discovered that such anime would give them more ratings, and started airing them in October. On weekday evenings, the Pretty Cure series, which airs on TV Asahi, aired in reruns on Tokyo MX. Since then, the station has aired many hits including the JoJo's Bizarre Adventure series, Broken Blade, the Love Live! series, Attack on Titan and Dr. Stone. The station has also gone to air reruns of other popular anime such as Dragon Ball and Gundam, along with Bushiroad's BanG Dream! and D4DJ. As Tokyo MX serves only Tokyo, their anime programming air elsewhere in Japan on member stations of the Japanese Association of Independent Television Stations (including KBS Kyoto, TV Kanagawa, Gunma TV, SUN TV and TV Saitama) which MX is a member of, the JNN/TBS Kansai affiliate MBS or sometimes ANN/TV Asahi Kansai affiliate ABC Television.

=== Sports on Tokyo MX ===
In June 2002, the station broadcast two matches of the 2002 FIFA World Cup.

== See also ==
- Television in Japan
- JAITS
- UHF anime
