= The staff ate it later =

Japanese TV entertainment term

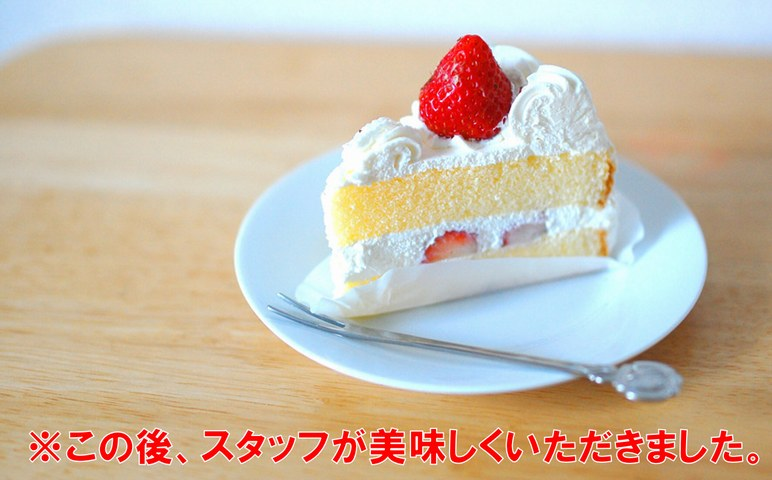
"The staff ate it later" as shown on screen

"The staff ate it later" (Japanese: この後、スタッフが美味しくいただきました, Hepburn: Kono ato, sutaffu ga oishiku itadakimashita; more fully translated as the staff ate and enjoyed it later) is a caption shown on screen in a Japanese TV program to indicate that the food presented during the program was not thrown away after filming. Some have questioned the authenticity of displaying the caption.

== First appearance ==
It is thought TV stations first began showing the caption to protect themselves against complaints from viewers who disliked food being handled without consideration in TV variety shows. It is uncertain when this note was first used, but TV producer Kenji Suga stated viewers complained about the waste of food when a performance using small watermelons was broadcast in Downtown no Gaki no Tsukai ya Arahende!! on Nippon TV. The TV station then showed this note on screen the following year in response.

== Authenticity ==
There are various claims as to whether or not staff actually eat the food that appears in the programs.

=== Supporting reports ===
According to AOL News in 2014, the crew on one information program claimed: "It's sometimes impossible for the reporter to eat all the food provided by the restaurant. The reporter is told not to eat it all, but the crew will eat the rest out of consideration and a feeling of obligation towards the restaurant."

Food comic artist Raswell Hosoki claimed in Meshizanmai Furusatonoaji (Meshizanmai Taste of Hometown) that the note is true. Eriko Miyazaki, a reporter and TV personality for food shows, also claimed the note is true and stated: "The crew eats the rest of the food, at least at the shows I appear in."

In January 2018, Miwa Asao, former professional beach volleyball player and TV personality, posted photos on her blog of staff eating food after recording "Saturday Night! Otona na TV". She wrote: "This is an on-site photo. The staff ate the rest of the food."

=== Refuting reports ===
Hitoshi Matsumoto, a comedian and TV host, was asked by sociologist Noritoshi Furuichi about this note in 2014 during the "Wide na Show" (Fuji Television). He said: "To be honest, I've never seen the crew eat the food. But that just means I haven't seen it. They might've eaten it."

Takeshi Kitano (also known as Beat Takeshi), a Japanese comedian, actor, and filmmaker, referred to an instance where cake was smeared on the floor and said in his book Bakaron: "Liars. Who's going to enjoy cake they splattered all over the floor?" Commentator Tsunehira Furuya also stated that the food featured in the show is not eaten by the staff later and is instead simply thrown into garbage bags.

== Reception ==
Commentator Tetsuya Uetaki has commented on displaying the note, saying: "Producers have become more aware as viewers have become more critical after issues such as the Aru Aru Mondai (a natto shortage caused by a program claiming eating natto would make people lose weight), and it's fine as one method for dealing with that." However, Uetaki went on to say: "This shifts responsibility onto the viewers. We can't let it end as simply an empty concession. I want to see variety shows strive to properly handle information and properly put the show together, from the moment they start building it."

Broadcast writer Sotani commented on the fact that production teams have become more sensitive to this in programs and have begun displaying such notes as an attempt to preempt criticism. He claims this sort of extreme self regulation risks leading to a decline. TV producer Kenji Suga claims it is necessary for programs to be disconnected from real life and society, to be "dumb and idiotic" to produce laughs.

Columnist Takashi Matsuo argues that adults, not TV shows, should teach children the ethics surrounding the importance of food. He also argues that if a parent is uncomfortable with what a comedian expresses on TV, the right course of action would be to change the channel or turn off the TV, not send a complaint to the TV station. Matsuo also points out the inconsistency that "the staff ate it later" caption is not displayed when large numbers of tomatoes are thrown at the festival of Tomatina in Spain or when athletes spray each other with champagne in celebration of a victory.

== See also ==
- Ethical eating – Moral food consumption choices
- Itadakimasu – Japanese phrase – "to humbly receive"
- Mottainai – Japanese term translates as "What a waste!"
