= Nara Television =

JONM-DTV

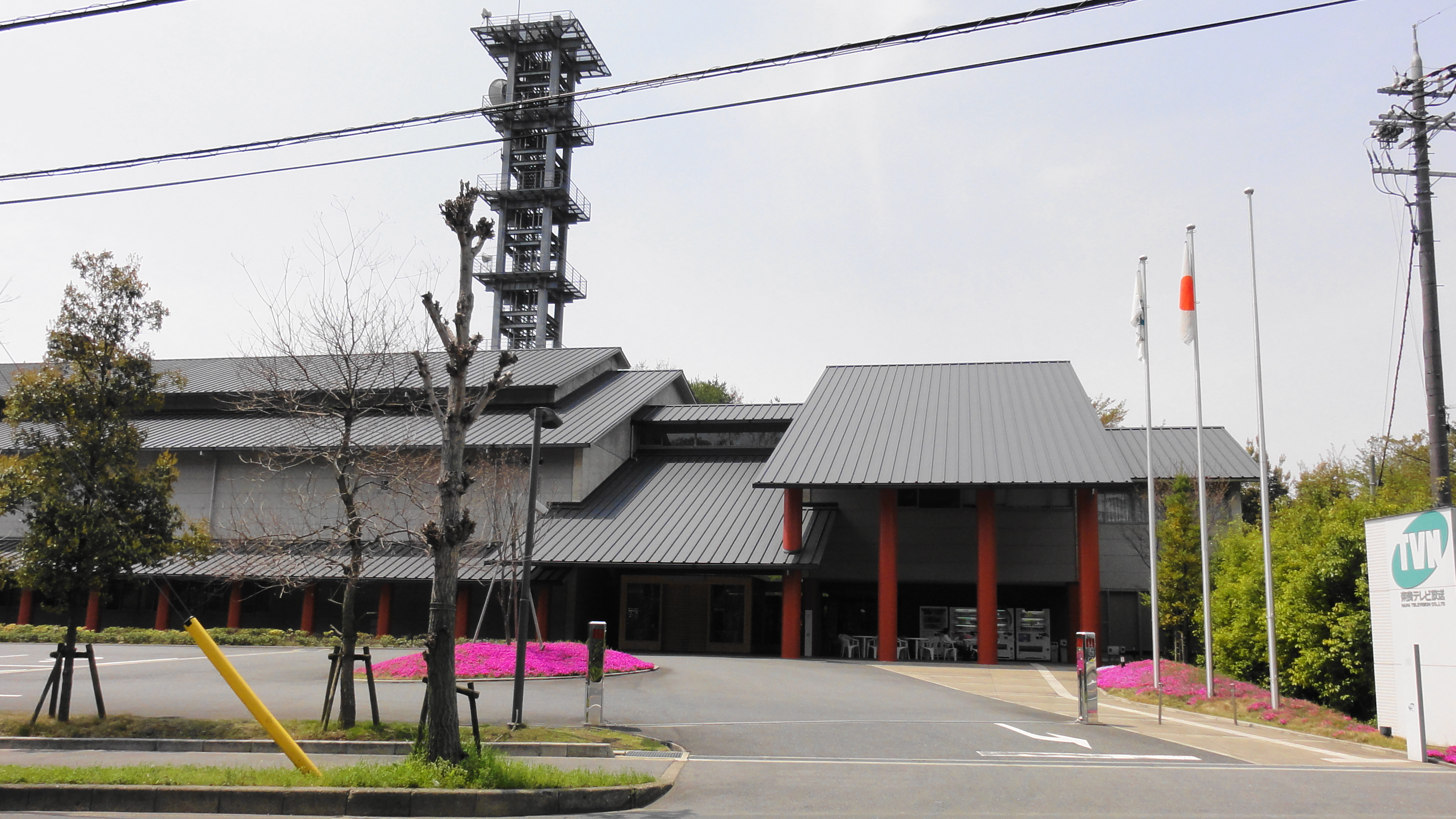
- Nara Prefecture; Japan
- City: Nara
- Channels: Digital: 29 (UHF); Virtual: 9

Programming
- Language: Japanese
- Affiliations: Independent (member of JAITS)

Ownership
- Owner: Nara Television Co., Ltd.

History
- First air date: April 1, 1973
- Former call signs: JONM-TV (1973-2011)
- Former channel numbers: 55 (analog UHF, 1973-2011)

Technical information
- Licensing authority: MIC

Links
- Website: naratv.co.jp

Nara Television Co., Ltd. (Japanese: 奈良テレビ放送株式会社) is a Japanese television broadcaster founded in 1972 and headquartered in Nara, Japan.

== History ==
Nara TV was founded on February 7, 1972 by Isamu Saeki, then president of Kinki Nippon Railway. Broadcasts started on April 1, 1973, six months ahead of the planned target of October 1. It operated from a base on the banks of Takaike, about 500m from the current facilities, and broadcast from there in the morning and evening hours. In 1978, the famous program Catch 55! premiered. The 55 was a reference to its UHF channel number. Currently the program is called Catch 5. At the time of premiere, it was aimed at young people.

On July 24, 2011, Nara TV permanently ceased its analog operations.

As of 2017, the television stations in the Kansai area rarely talk about Nara Prefecture in news and other programs - only 5% of the coverage share.

On March 25, 2024, TVN upgraded its master control to allow the station to broadcast subchannels; two weeks later on April 8, its programs became available on VOD platform TVer.
