= Chiba Television Broadcasting =

JOCL-DTV
- Logo used since 2008

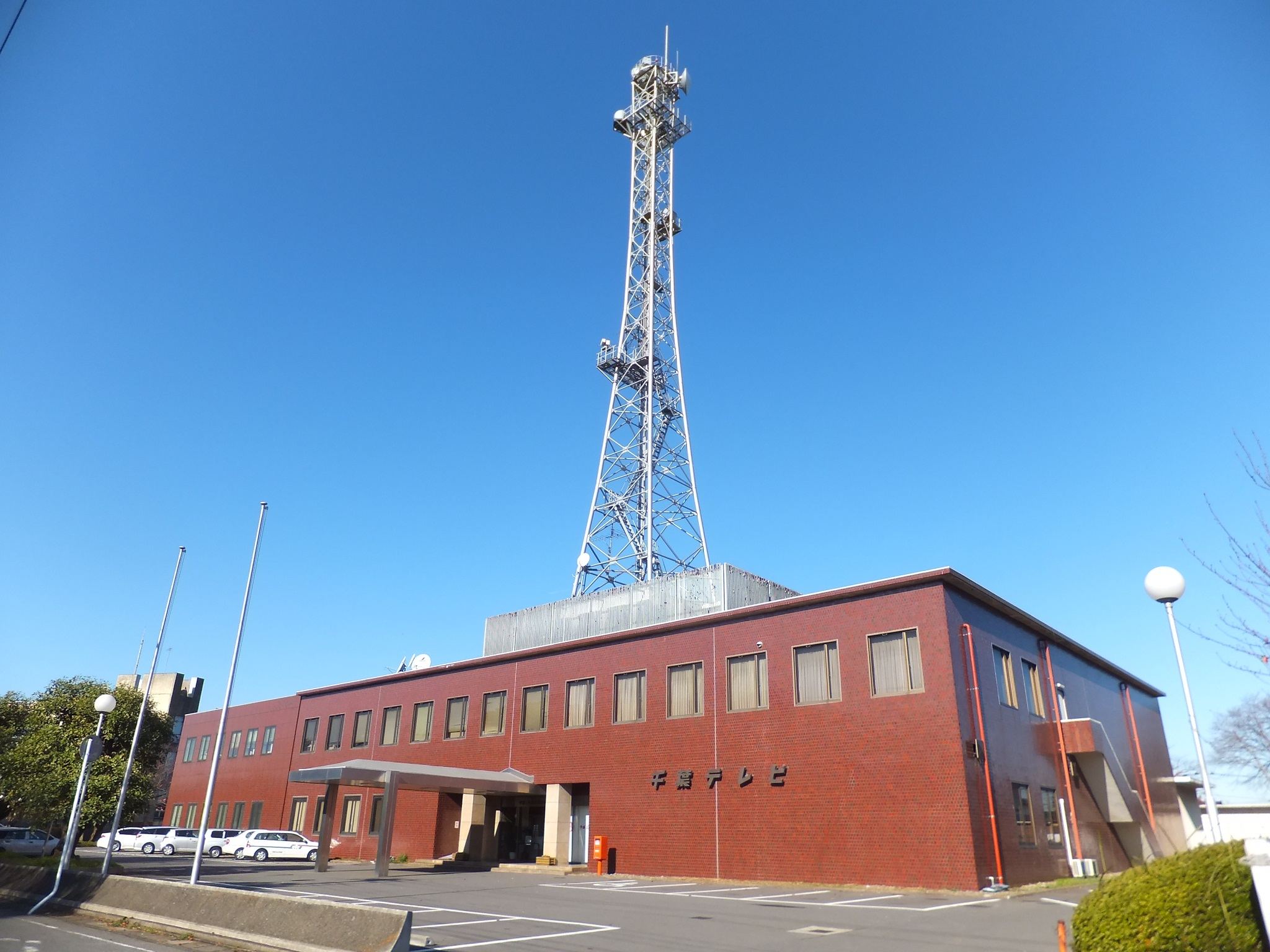
- Headquarters in Chūō-ku, Chiba
- Chiba Prefecture; Japan
- City: Chiba
- Channels: Digital: 30 (UHF); Virtual: 3
- Branding: Chiba Television, CTC

Programming
- Language: Japanese
- Affiliations: Independent (member of JAITS)

Ownership
- Owner: Chiba Television Broadcasting Corporation

History
- First air date: May 1, 1971
- Former call signs: JOCL-TV (1971-2011)
- Former channel numbers: Analog: 46 (UHF, 1971–2011)

Technical information
- Licensing authority: MIC

Links
- Website: https://www.chiba-tv.com

Chiba Television Broadcasting Corporation (千葉テレビ放送株式会社, Chiba Terebi Hōsō Kabushiki-gaisha; CTC), doing business as Chiba TV (チバテレビ), is a Japanese commercial terrestrial television broadcasting company headquartered at 11-25 Miyako-chō 1-chōme, Chūō-ku, Chiba serving Chiba Prefecture but spill-over is received in the neighbouring prefectures. It is a member of the Japanese Association of Independent Television Stations (JAITS). It is often involved in UHF anime "production committee" projects chairing other stations. Most anime broadcasts are what are considered seinen anime.

Logo used from 1971 until 2006.

== History ==
Chiba Television Broadcasting was founded January 28, 1970, and officially began broadcasting May 1, 1971. Digital broadcast officially began April 1, 2006.

== See also ==
- Japanese Association of Independent Television Stations
