= JAITS =

Japanese Association of Independent Television Stations

Japanese Association of Independent Television Stations
- 全国独立放送協議会
- Abbreviation: JAITS
- Formation: 4 November 1977; 48 years ago
- Location: Japan
- Official language: Japanese

The Japanese Association of Independent Television Stations (JAITS; Japanese: 全国独立放送協議会, romanized: Zenkoku Dokuritsu Hōsō Kyōgi-kai, lit. 'National Independent Broadcasting Forum') is a group of Japan's reception fee-free commercial terrestrial television stations which are not members of the major national television networks. The association was established on 4 November 1977.

Its members sell to, buy from, and co-produce programmes with other members. While a few of them, namely Tokyo MX, TVK and Sun TV and sell more than the others, it does not mean the former control the others in programming. It forms a loose broadcast network without exclusivity. They form permanent and ad hoc subgroups for production and sales of advertising opportunity.

== Name ==
The English name of the group is provisional. The Japanese documents for the association refer to the acronym JAITS but the fully spelled English name has not been disclosed yet.

In Japanese, the group was previously known as Zenkoku Dokuritsu Yū-eichi-efu Hōsō Kyōgi-kai (Japanese: 全国独立UHF放送協議会, lit. 'National Independent UHF Broadcasting Forum'), bearing the term UHF as all of the member stations broadcast on the UHF band in analogue, in contrast to major networks that primarily broadcast on the VHF band in analogue. All of the Japanese terrestrial television stations switched to UHF digital when all analog television transmissions (both VHF and UHF) were shut down between 24 July 2011 and 31 March 2012.

== List of members ==
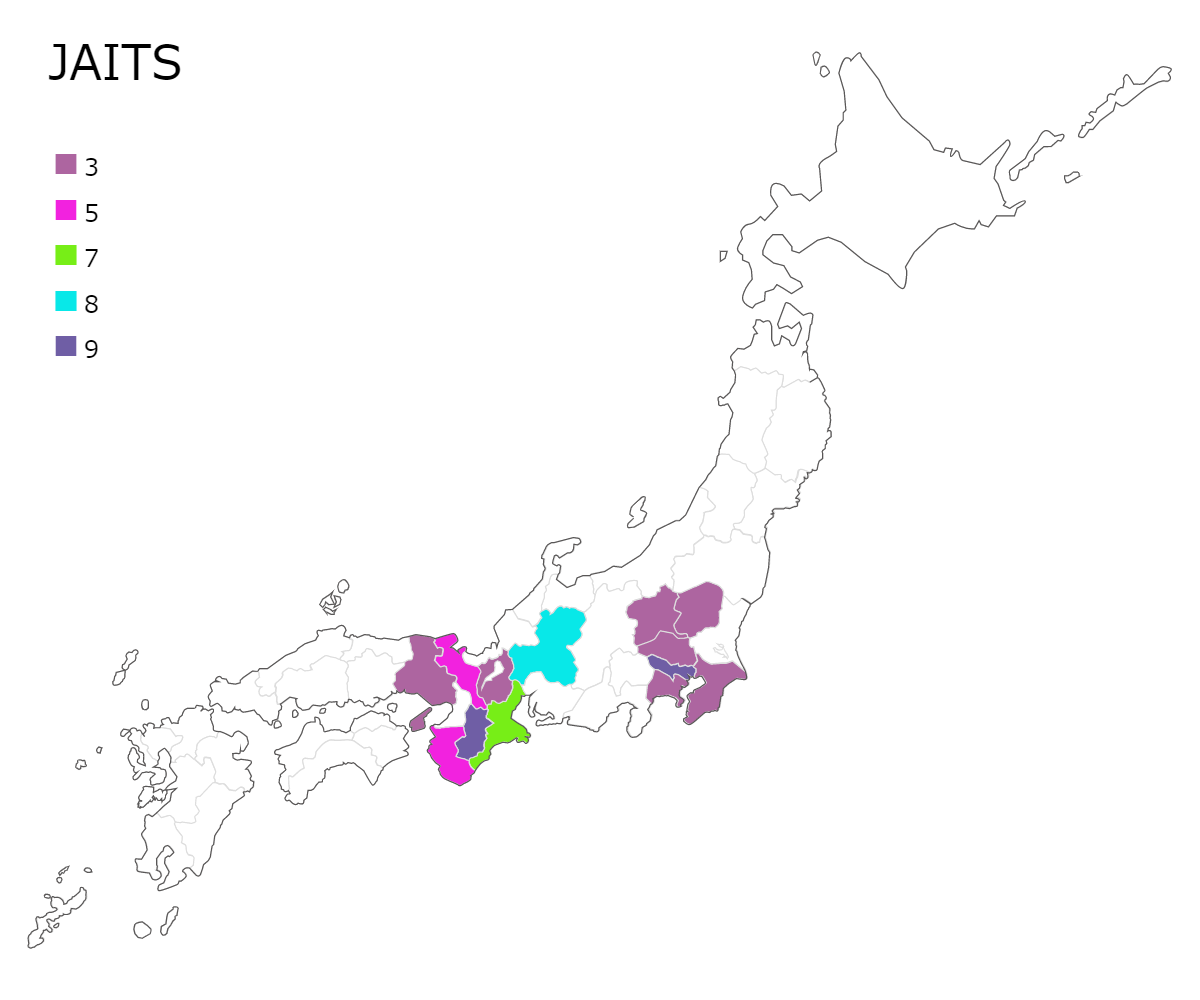
LCN assignments for JAITS members

Stations are listed in Japanese order of prefectures which is mirrored in ISO 3166-2:JP.

Broadcasting area(s)		Station			LCN	Start date of broadcast	Note(s)
Prefecture	Region	On air branding	Abbr.	Call sign	LCN	Start date of broadcast	Note(s)
Tochigi	Kantō	Tochigi TV	GYT	JOGY-DTV	3	1 April 1999	
Gunma	Kantō	Gunma TV / GunTele	GTV	JOML-DTV	3	16 April 1971	
Saitama	Kantō	TV Saitama / Teletama	TVS	JOUS-DTV	3	1 April 1979	
Chiba	Kantō	Chiba TV	CTC	JOCL-DTV	3	1 May 1971	
Tokyo	Kantō	Tokyo MX	MX	JOMX-DTV	9	1 November 1995	
Kanagawa	Kantō	TV Kanagawa	tvk	JOKM-DTV	3	1 April 1972	
Gifu	Chūbu	Gifu Hōsō / Gifu Chan	GBS	JOZF-DTV	8	12 August 1968	
Mie	Kansai	Mie TV	MTV	JOMH-DTV	7	1 December 1969	
Shiga	Kansai	Biwako Hōsō	BBC	JOBL-DTV	3	1 April 1972	
Kyoto	Kansai	KBS Kyoto	KBS	JOBR-DTV	5	1 April 1969	
Hyōgo	Kansai	Sun TV	SUN	JOUH-DTV	3	1 May 1969	
Nara	Kansai	Nara TV	TVN	JONM-DTV	9	1 April 1973	
Wakayama	Kansai	TV Wakayama	WTV	JOOM-DTV	5	1 April 1974	

== Characteristics of the independent stations ==
=== Degree of independence ===
In the strict (North American) definition of "not affiliated with any networks", the only independent terrestrial television station in Japan in recent times would have been The Open University of Japan, which produces almost all its programs in-house. (Note: The Open University of Japan closed its terrestrial television station in the Kanto region in October 2018, in favour of expanded broadcasts via Japan's broadcasting satellite service.)

The JAITS and the Japanese public use the term "Independent UHF Station" (Japanese: 独立U(HF)局, romanized: dokuritsu Yū(-eichi-efu) kyoku) to refer to stations outside of the major commercial television networks, in which the flagship Tokyo-based stations control the majority of their affiliates' programming. Those networks are also affiliated with large national newspapers. On the other hand, the JAITS stations are often affiliated with prefectural or metropolitan newspapers (for example, a number of stations have investments from the Chunichi Shimbun) and prefectural governments, whose degree of influence may vary.

Due to the limited reach of the TX Network, a number of JAITS stations (such as MTV, GBS, BBC, TVN, and WTV) also broadcast a selection of programs syndicated from TV Tokyo or its affiliates.

=== Market ===
Their areas of coverage are located in Kantō, Chūkyō and Kansai regions which are the most urbanised in Japan. Their reachable population is relatively large, and these areas are thus able to support the presence of additional commercial stations beyond those of the major networks. However, much like independent stations outside Japan, the presence of major network stations and the cost of externally-sourced content tends to limit viewing ratings compared to their competitors. Multi-channel cable television may also cover significant parts of the areas.

=== Programming ===
Compared with the major networks, the independent stations have a relatively smaller audience, but have a more flexible schedule due to their decentralized nature.

Short-running anime productions (as little as one episode) are often broadcast by the independent stations, a concept which has been referred to as "UHF anime". They also sometimes run shopping programming, along with brokered programming such as infomercials and televangelism. In 2000, All Japan Pro Wrestling moved to JAITS affiliates after it ended its run on Nippon TV.

== See also ==
- Independent station
