= Biwako Broadcasting =

JOBL-DTV
- Logo used since 1990

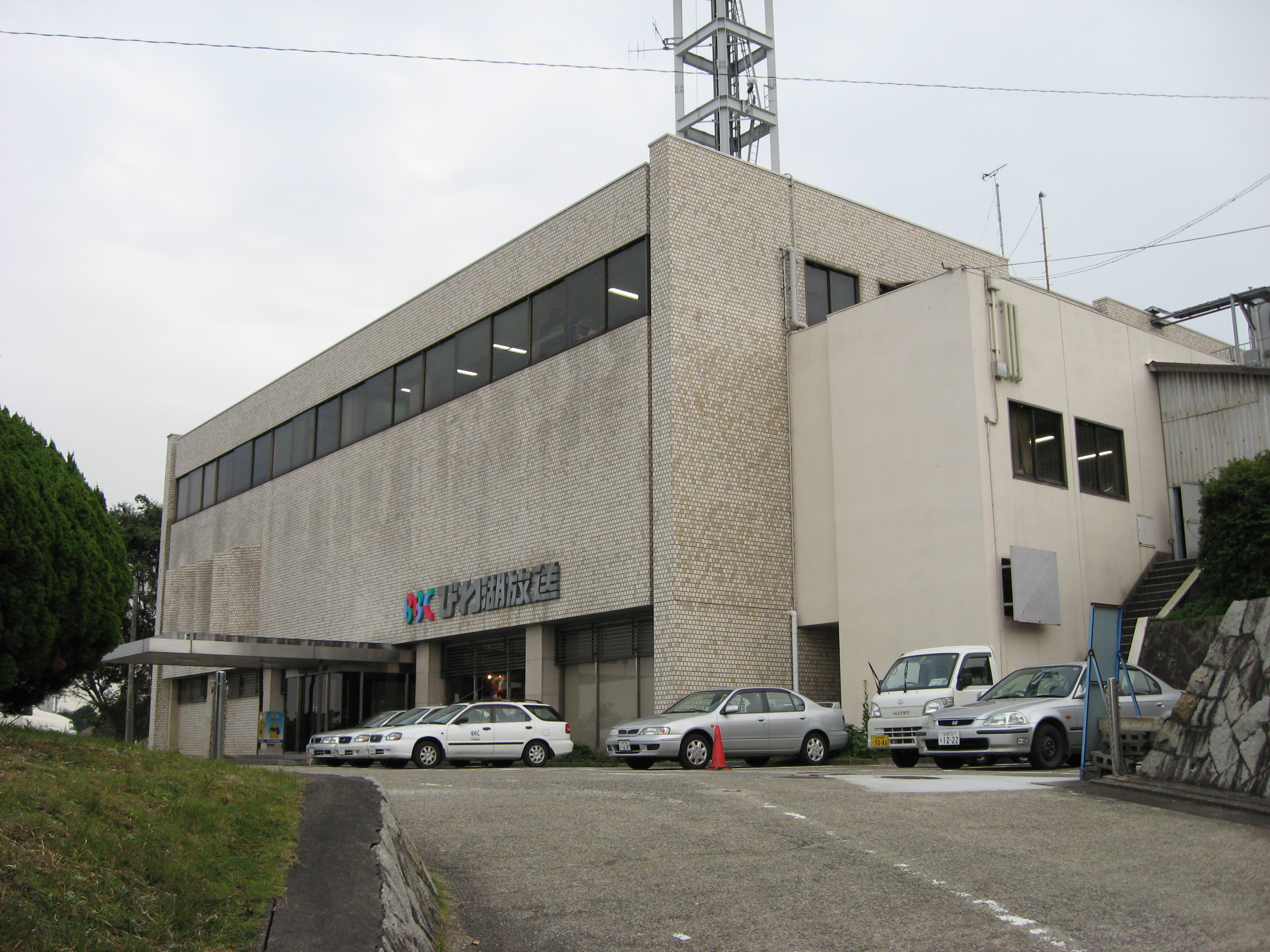
- Headquarters in Otsu
- Shiga Prefecture; Japan
- City: Otsu
- Channels: Digital: 20 (UHF); Virtual: 3
- Branding: BBC; Biwako Broadcasting

Programming
- Language: Japanese
- Affiliations: Independent (member of JAITS)

Ownership
- Owner: Biwako Broadcasting, Co., Ltd.

History
- Founded: May 22, 1971
- First air date: April 1, 1972
- Former call signs: JOBL-TV (1972-2011)
- Former channel numbers: Analog: 30 (UHF, 1972–2011)
- Call sign meaning: JO Biwa Lake

Technical information
- Licensing authority: MIC
- Translator(s): see below

Links
- Website: www.bbc-tv.co.jp

Biwako Broadcasting Co., Ltd. (BBC) (びわ湖放送株式会社, Biwako Hōsō Kabushiki-gaisha; lit. Lake Biwa Broadcasting), is a fee-free commercial terrestrial television station serving Shiga Prefecture of Japan. It started broadcasting in 1972.

It is a member of the Japanese Association of Independent Television Stations (JAITS, Popular name Independent UHF Station). In October 2006, Biwako Broadcasting starts digital TV broadcasting.
