= Mie Television =

JOMH-DTV
- Logo used since 2010

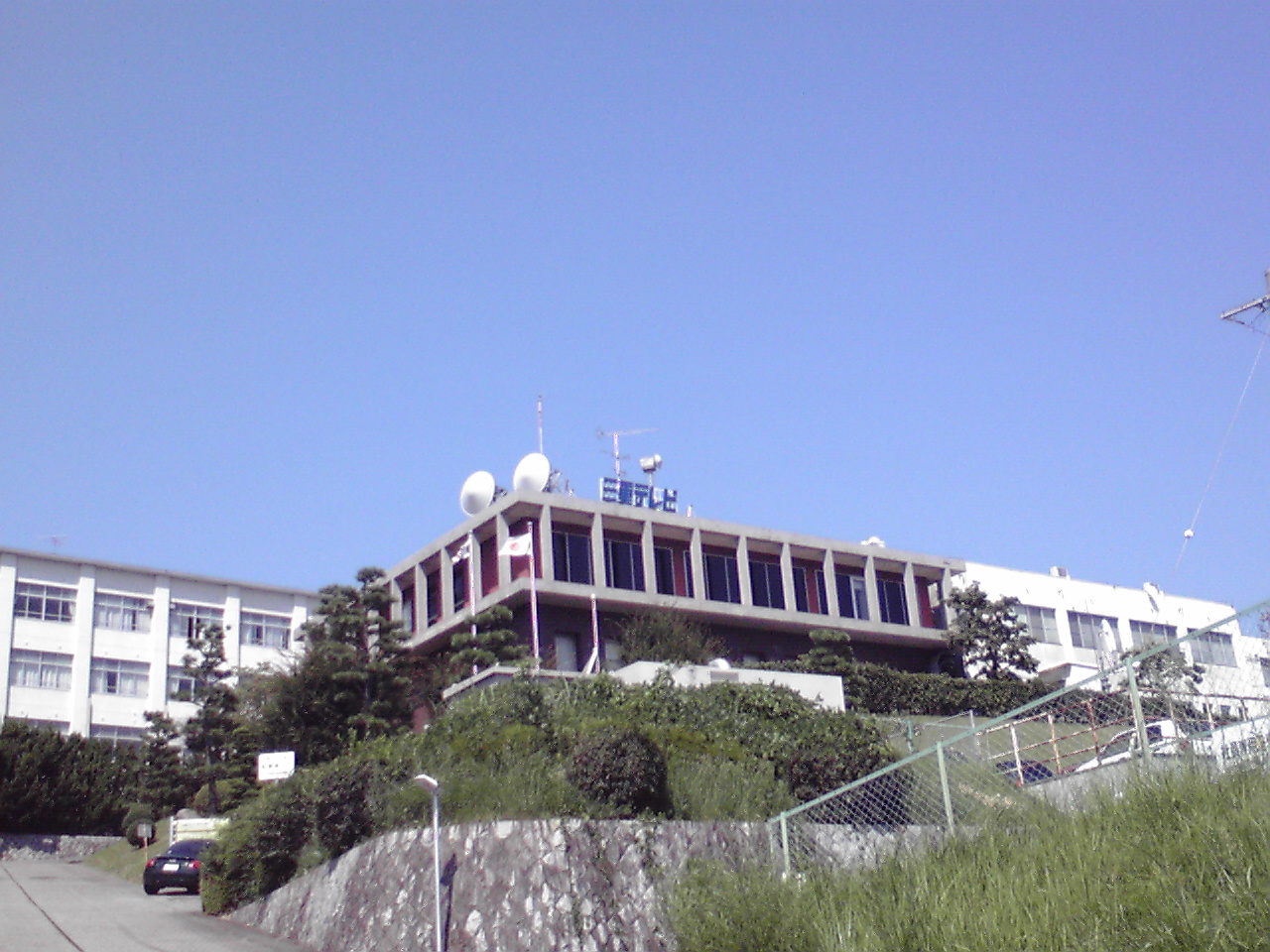
- Headquarters in Shibumicho, Tsu
- Mie Prefecture; Japan
- City: Tsu
- Channels: Digital: 27 (UHF); Virtual: 7
- Branding: Mie Television; MTV

Programming
- Language: Japanese
- Affiliations: Independent (member of JAITS)

Ownership
- Owner: Mie Television Broadcasting Co., Ltd.

History
- Founded: March 8, 1969; 57 years ago
- First air date: December 1, 1969; 56 years ago
- Former call signs: JOMH-TV (1969–2011)
- Former channel numbers: 33 (analog UHF, 1969–2011)
- Call sign meaning: Mie Hoso

Technical information
- Licensing authority: MIC

Links
- Website: https://www.mietv.com/

Mie Television Broadcasting Co., Ltd. (三重テレビ放送, Mie Terebi Hōsō), also known as MTV, is a television station headquartered in Tsu, Mie Prefecture, Japan.

It is a member of the Japanese Association of Independent Television Stations, and the only commercial television station in Mie Prefecture. Nagoya Dome is its primary shareholder.

Mie TV was founded in 1968, and first commenced television broadcasting in December 1969. Mie TV started digital terrestrial television broadcasting in 2005. It is also possible to watch Mie TV from some parts of Aichi prefecture.

== History ==
After the release of UHF radio broadcasting for open use by the Ministry of Posts and Telecommunications, an application was made to open UHF TV stations in various parts of Japan, and the tide of UHF TV stations was established in Mie Prefecture. In 1961, an application was made for Chubu Television (中部テレビ) to be opened in Mie Prefecture. After this, Television Mie (テレビ三重) was located in 1963, and TV Mie (TV Mie) was located in 1965 and application was established for the Mie Region TV station. In October 1967, the Ministry of Posts and Telecommunications public UHF frequent route distribution plan was announced, and the Mie Region distribution plan was announced. The application previously submitted by the Sanke Company and the Mie Radio Broadcasting Co., Ltd., for the time being, has been reviewed by the Mie Area Television Station. On November 1 of the same year, the acquisition of Mie Broadcasting was decided and the name Mie Television Station was released. Mie Television Station was officially registered on March 8, 1968, and the decision was made to build the Hasayayama construction tower in Tsu, and the land purchase and repair department in Tanmioka. In April of the same year, Mie Broadcasting was officially renamed. The Ministry of Posts and Telecommunications first requested that the Mie Television station be broadcast on May 1, 1969, but the Haseyama launch tower project was postponed, and the broadcast date was postponed.

On October 1, 1969, Mie Television began trial broadcasting. On December 1 of the same year, Mie Television officially launched. In order to popularize UHF receivers, Mie Television set up a local business, the Mie UHF popularization promotion meeting was held, and active implementation of UHF receivers, the use of Mie TV sets, and the rapid expansion of Mie TV sets. July 7, 1971, Mie TV broadcast the first Mie prefecture conference for the first time. Mie Television Station was established in 1973, and the current status of the Ise Jingu Shrine Special Milestone. Mie Television visited China in 1977 during the Japan-China friendship visit to Mie Prefecture, covered the People's Republic of China, and was also interviewed overseas by Mie Television. The following year, Mie Television's reporting team was sent to the West, and the production was completed in the 3rd year of the production, a special milestone.

In 1979, 10 weeks after broadcasting, the Mie Television station recording shelf was completed, and the production environment for the Mie Television station was greatly improved. At the same time, Mie Television Station was used as a new trademark, and the internal area coverage rate exceeded 90%. In 1981 and 1982, Mie Television Station was once repeatedly damaged. However, in 1983, Mie Television's current status was 94-95. In 1983, Mie Television reached a milestone of 40%, which was a milestone for TV Tokyo. However, due to this, the spread of TV Aichi, and the proportional start decrease of Tokyo Television Station during the turning point of Mie Television Station.

A scandal erupted on September 7, 2022 where an employee of the station's Tokyo branch was arrested on charges of bribery, along with the manager of the Business Management Division of the Tsu City Boat Race Division, for allegedly accepting bribes from an advertising company in return for favors regarding the Tsu Boat Race Course's advertising outsourcing contract.

On April 3, 2023, the station started broadcasting a simulcast of "Pick Up On Mie～Pomie!" from FM Mie between 7:30 and 8am. Some of its productions were made available on the TVer platform in November 2023.
