= Television Saitama =

JOUS-DTV
- Logo used since 2006

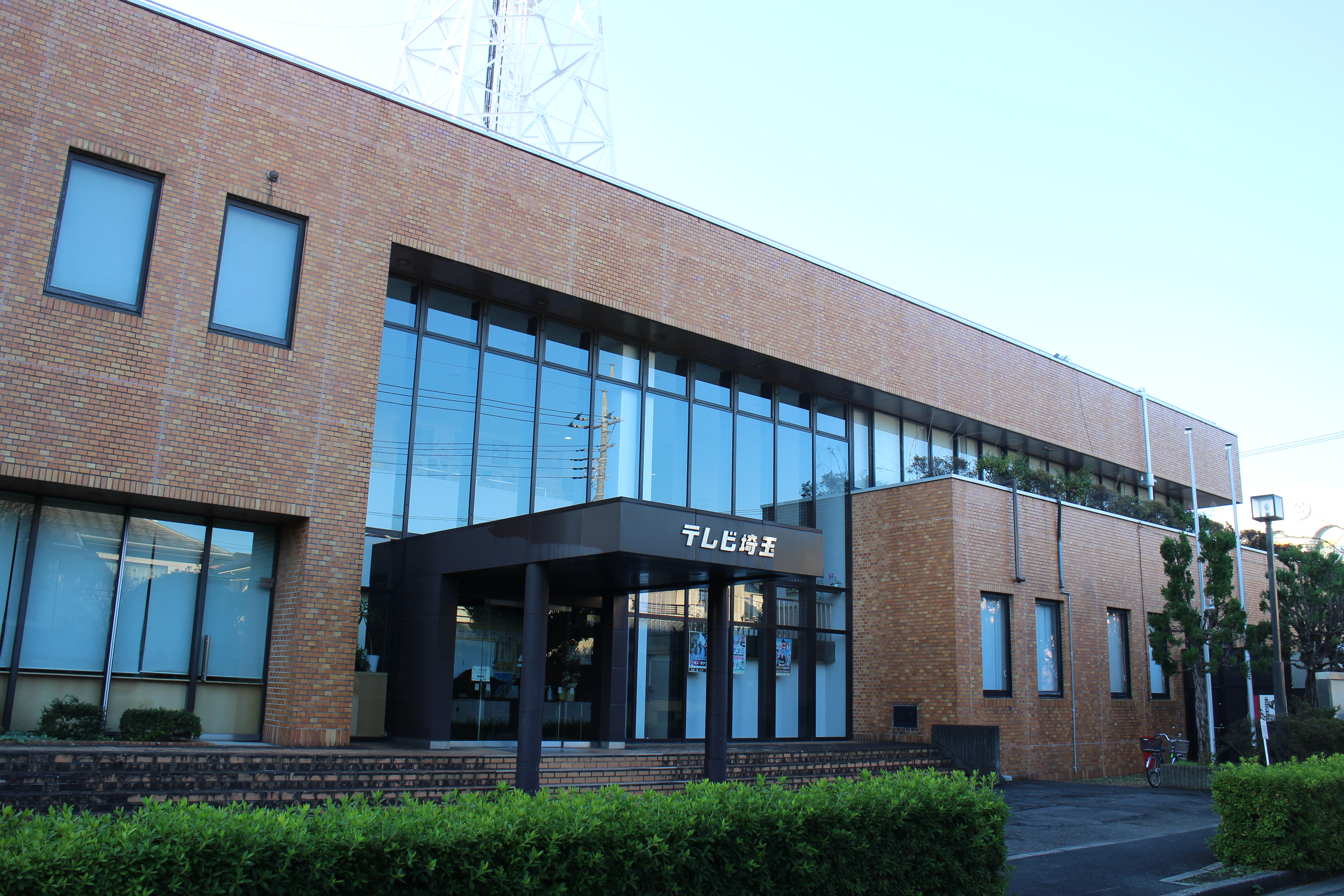
- Headquarters in Urawa, Saitama
- Saitama Prefecture; Japan
- City: Saitama City
- Channels: Digital: 32 (UHF); Virtual: 3
- Branding: Television Saitama; Teletama; TVS

Programming
- Language: Japanese
- Affiliations: Independent (member of JAITS)

Ownership
- Owner: Television Saitama Co., Ltd.

History
- Founded: April 28, 1978
- First air date: April 1, 1979
- Former call signs: JOUS-TV (1979-2011)
- Former channel numbers: Analog: 38 (UHF, 1979–2011)
- Call sign meaning: Urawa-ku, Saitama City, location of its current headquarters

Technical information
- Licensing authority: MIC

Links
- Website: www.teletama.jp

Television Saitama Co., Ltd. (株式会社テレビ埼玉, Kabushiki-gaisha Terebi Saitama) abbreviated TVS, doing business as Teletama (テレ玉, Teretama), is a Japanese fee-free terrestrial commercial television broadcasting company headquartered in Urawa-ku, Saitama City, Saitama Prefecture, Japan. Its intended coverage is Saitama Prefecture but with some spill-overs into surrounding prefectures. Teletama is an "independent" terrestrial television station, which means not belonging to any major national networks keyed in Tokyo and Osaka. It is a member of the Japanese Association of Independent Television Stations (JAITS) and co-produces, exchanges programs and sells advertising opportunity with other members.

== Data ==
- Callsign: JOUS-DTV (digital), JOUS-TV (analog, closed on July 24, 2011),
- Channels: channel 32 (digital), channel 38 (analog, closed on July 24, 2011)
- Transmitters: Hiranohara Transmitting Station, Sakura-ku, Saitama, Saitama and other relay stations.

== Programming ==
Being in the coverage of major stations in Tokyo, its major expected role is to provide prefecture specific programming to Saitama prefecture's residents. Local government information, local business and racing programs are in the genre. Sports by the local amateur and professional clubs earn high viewership for the station. J. League football (soccer) and Saitama Seibu Lions baseball game programs are sold to other JAITS and some "dependent" stations.

Compared with the major network stations, it is one of the JAITS stations which have the lower average ratings (meaning the cheaper sponsorship fee) in the large reachable population. The later beginning and the earlier ending hours of live and / or scheduled programs allow flexible programming. A few single episodes or short series of Japanese animation (anime) are also broadcast and are called "UHF anime". It also broadcasts brokered programming such as religion shows and infomercials. Teletama also runs its own shopping program.

== History ==
- 1 April 1979: Analog broadcasting officially starts.
- 1 December 2005: Digital broadcasting officially starts.
- 1 April 2006: Started doing business as "Teletama".

== See also ==
- Japanese Association of Independent Television Stations
