= Sun Television =

JOUH-DTV
- Logo used since 2019

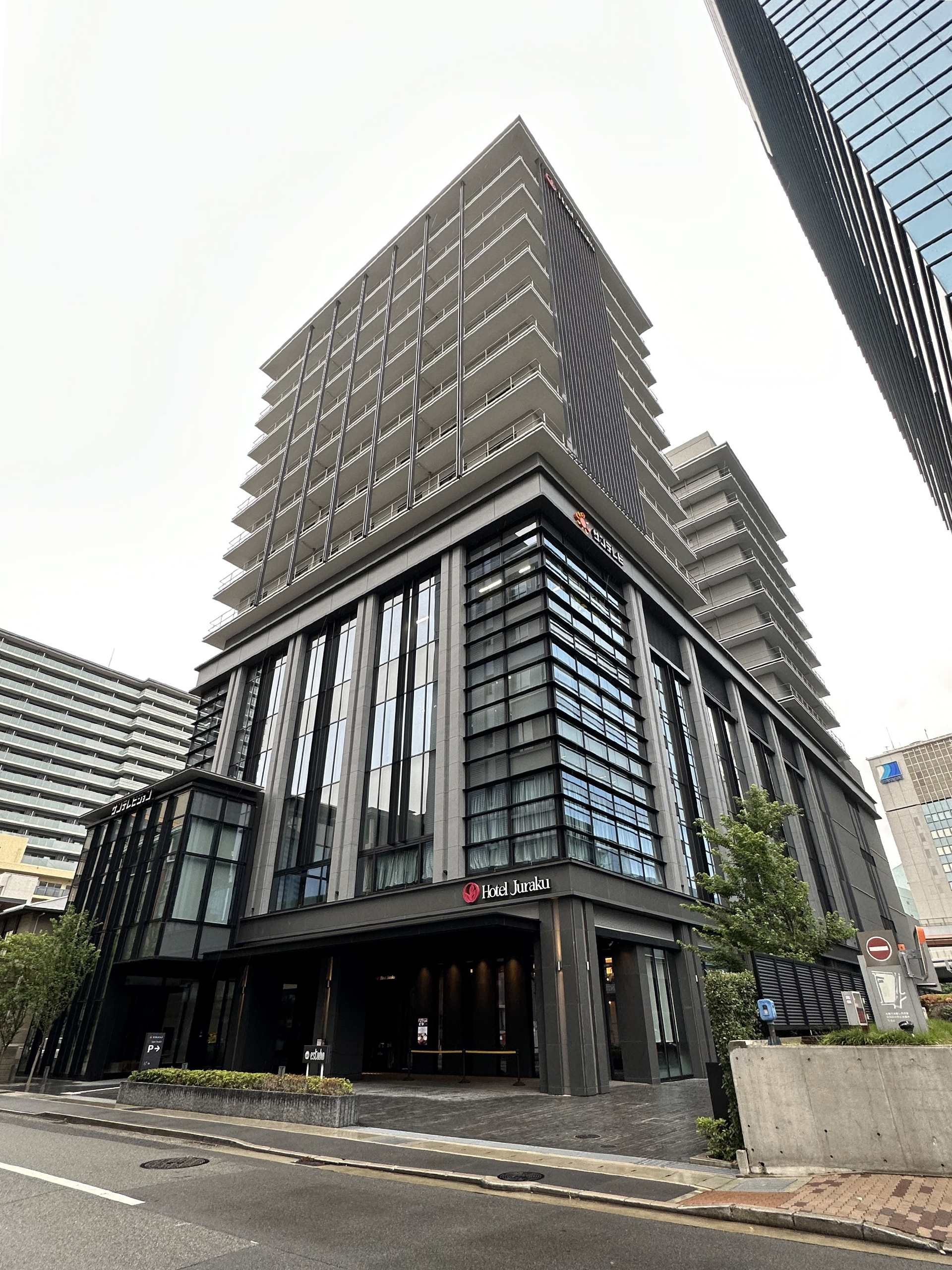
- Sun Television head office in Kobe Ekimae Just Square
- Hyogo Prefecture; Japan
- City: Kobe
- Channels: Digital: 26 (UHF); Virtual: 3
- Branding: SUN, SUN-TV

Programming
- Affiliations: Independent (member of JAITS)

Ownership
- Owner: Sun Television Co., Ltd.

History
- First air date: May 1, 1969; 57 years ago
- Former call signs: JOUH-TV (1969-2011)
- Former channel numbers: Analog: 36 (UHF, 1969-2011)
- Call sign meaning: UHF/Hyogo

Technical information
- Licensing authority: MIC
- ERP: 5.89 kW
- Transmitter coordinates: 34°44′2.18″N 135°12′21.34″E
- Translator(s): see Stations

Links
- Website: https://www.sun-tv.co.jp/

Logo used until December 2018

Sun Television Co., Ltd. (株式会社サンテレビジョン, Kabushiki-gaisha San Terebijon; SUN, Sun TV) is a commercial television station headquartered in Kobe, Hyōgo Prefecture, Japan, and a member of the Japanese Association of Independent Television Stations (JAITS).

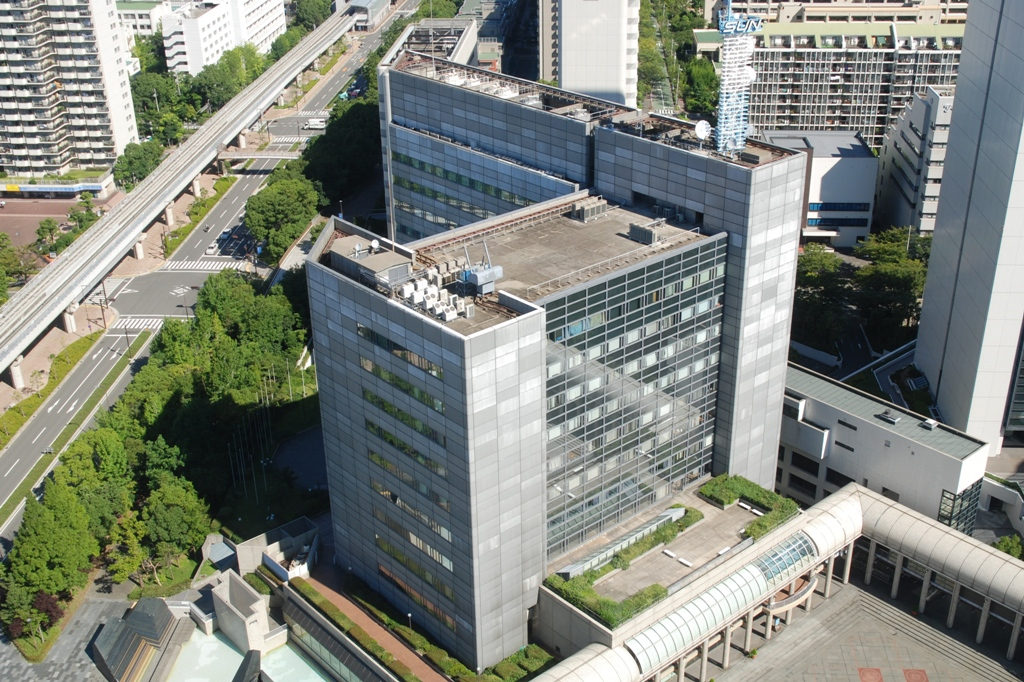
Sun Television former head office in Kobe International Conference Center

== See also ==
- Japanese Association of Independent Television Stations (Independent UHF Station)
- UHF anime
