= Gunma Television =

JOML-DTV
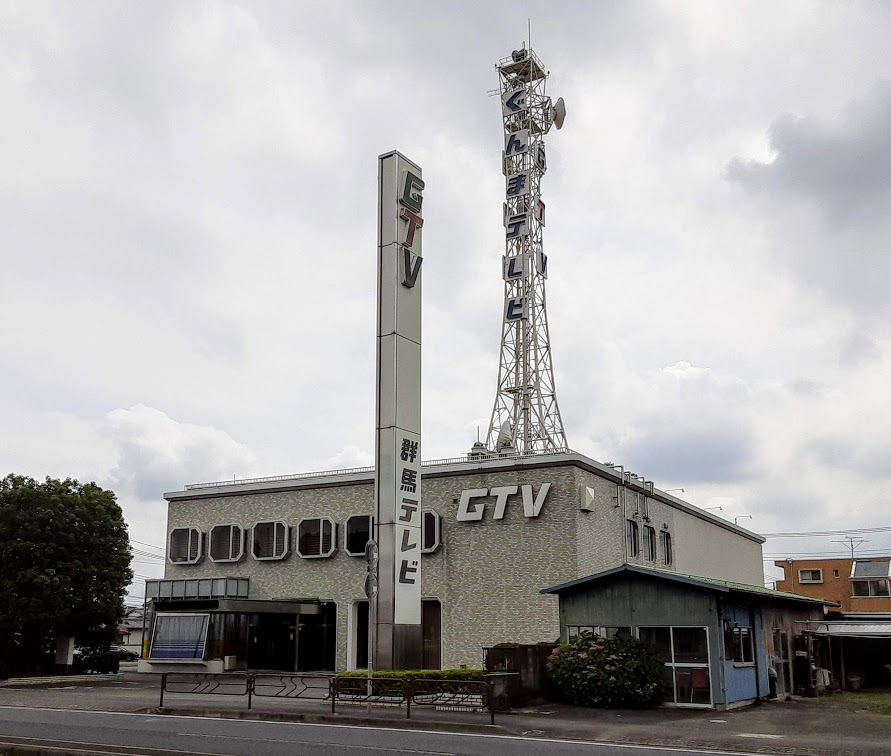
- Headquarters in Kamikoidemachi, Maebashi
- Gunma Prefecture; Japan
- City: Maebashi
- Channels: Digital: 19 (UHF); Virtual: 3
- Branding: Gunma TV; GTV; Guntele

Programming
- Language: Japanese
- Affiliations: Independent (member of JAITS)

Ownership
- Owner: Gunma Television Co., Ltd.

History
- Founded: February 16, 1970
- First air date: April 16, 1971
- Former call signs: JOML-TV (1971-2011)
- Former channel numbers: Analog: 48 (UHF, 1971-2011)

Technical information
- Licensing authority: MIC

Links
- Website: https://www.gtv.co.jp/

Logo used from 1971 to 2025, currently used as a secondary logo.

Gunma Television (群馬テレビ, Gunma Terebi), also known as GTV, is a television network headquartered in Gunma Prefecture, Japan. It is a member of the Japanese Association of Independent Television Stations (JAITS). The government of Gunma Prefecture is the biggest shareholder of GTV, and they broadcast its promotion program on GTV.

Gunma TV is the first independent television station in Kantō region, it was started broadcast in 1971. On September 1, 2006, GTV started digital terrestrial television broadcasting.

news eye8 (ニュースeye8) is GTV's flagship news program. Jungle Pocket Road (ジャンポケロード) is one of GTV's main variety program, also it is a promotion program for the Gunma prefecture government.
