= UHF anime =

Anime broadcast by independent stations in Japan

UHF anime (UHFアニメ, YūEichiEfu anime) refers to the anime (produced in prospect of being) broadcast by independent stations generally located in the Kanto, Chukyo and Kansai regions of Japan, who are members of the Japanese Association of Independent Television Stations (JAITS). Other common names for UHF anime include U-kyoku anime (U局アニメ) and U-kei anime (U系アニメ). The UHF anime are usually produced by "production committees" (製作委員会, seisaku iin-kai), formed by the packaged media, merchandising and video game stakeholders, with limited commitment from the broadcasters for broadcast self-regulation. In contrast to the major network stations such as TV Tokyo who are the leading stakeholders in the production, the producers often pay the broadcasters as brokered programming.

== History ==
Historically, UHF anime has played a significant role in the international dissemination of anime. For example, in the United States, UHF channels broadcast Japanese anime series with subtitles, which helped to foster an early fan base for anime outside Japan. This phenomenon was particularly notable in cities with large Japanese populations, such as New York City and Chicago, where fans could access uncut Japanese animation through these UHF transmissions.

== See also ==
- Independent UHF station
- Late night anime
