= List of Chinese-language television channels =

This is a list of television networks and television channels that are broadcast in the Chinese language or offer at least some programming in Chinese.

== Mainland China ==
=== National networks ===
- China Central Television (CCTV)
  - CCTV-1
  - CCTV-2
  - CCTV-3
  - CCTV-4
    - Asia
    - Europe
    - America
  - CCTV-5
  - CCTV-6
  - CCTV-7
  - CCTV-8
  - CCTV-9
  - CCTV-10
  - CCTV-11
  - CCTV-12
  - CCTV-13
  - CCTV-14
  - CCTV-15
  - CCTV-16
  - CCTV-17
  - CCTV-5+
- China Education Television (CETV)
- China Xinhua News Network Corporation (CNC)
  - CNC World
- China Weather TV

==== Digital television networks ====
- NewsFlash 新动漫
- WinTV 天盛欧洲足球频道

==== Cable networks ====
- MTV Mandarin
- Huaxia Television 华夏电视台
- Discovery Travel & Living Asia 亚洲旅游台
- Discovery Channel
- Celestial Movies 天映电影频道
- National Geographic Channel (NGC) 国家地理频道
- AXN 索尼动作频道
- Beijing TV
- Goal TV
- TrueVisions UBC泰星
- HBO
- Hunan TV
- ESPN
- Channel V
- Channel NewsAsia (CNA) 新加坡亚洲新

== Hong Kong ==
=== Free-to-air networks ===
- Television Broadcasts Limited (TVB) 無綫電視 (電視廣播有限公司)
  - TVB Jade 翡翠台
  - TVB Pearl 明珠台 (Selected program in Cantonese dubbed & the following program in Putonghua)
  - TVB Plus
  - TVB News Channel 無綫新聞台
- Radio Television Hong Kong (RTHK) 香港電台
  - RTHK 31
  - RTHK 33
  - RTHK 34
  - RTHK 35
- HK Television Entertainment Company Limited 香港電視娛樂
  - ViuTVsix (Selected program in Cantonese dubbed & the following program in Putonghua)
  - ViuTV
- Fantastic Television Limited 奇妙電視
  - HOY TV Channel 77
  - HOY International Business Channel 76
  - HOY Infotainment Channel 78

=== Cable networks ===
- Cable TV Hong Kong (HKCTV) 香港有線電視
  - i-CABLE News

=== Premium networks ===
- Phoenix Television 鳳凰衛視
  - Phoenix Chinese Channel
  - Phoenix Movies Channel
  - Phoenix InfoNews Channel
  - Phoenix Hong Kong Channel
- STAR TV (STAR) 星空傳媒
  - STAR Chinese Channel
  - STAR Chinese Movies
  - National Geographic Channel
- Sun Television (SUN) 陽光衛視
  - SUN Channel

=== Broadband networks ===
- now TV (now) Now 寬頻電視
  - Now TV channel
  - Now News Channel
  - Now Business News Channel
  - Now Baogu Movie
  - Now Baogu Superstars
- myTV SUPER
  - TVB Japanese Drama
  - TVB Korean Drama
  - TVB Chinese Drama
  - TVB Classic
  - TVB Classic Movies
  - SUPER Kids Channel
- Hong Kong Broadband Network (HKBN) 香港寬頻網絡有限公司
  - bbTV (香港寬頻)

=== Other networks ===
- Health & Lifestyle Channel (HLC) 健康生活台
  - Health & Lifestyle Channel
- Mei Ah Entertainment 美亞娛樂
  - Mei Ah Channel
- Celestial Movies 天映頻道
  - Celestial Movies Channel

=== Mobile networks ===
- RoadShow 路訊通
  - RoadShow Channel
- Newsline Express 新聞直線
  - Newsline Express Channel

== Macau ==
- Teledifusão de Macau (TDM) 澳廣視
  - TDM Ou Mun 澳視澳門台
  - Canal Macau 澳視葡文
- Macau Asia Satellite Television (MASTV) 澳亞衛視
  - MASTV Channel
- Lotus Television (LTV) 澳門蓮花衞視
  - Lotus TV Macau

== Taiwan ==
=== Free-to-air networks ===
- Taiwan Television (TTV) 台灣電視
  - TTV Channel
  - TTV Family
  - TTV Finance
  - TTV World
- China Television (CTV) 中國電視
  - CTV Channel
  - CTV News Channel
  - CTV MyLife
- Formosa Television
  - Formosa Television (FTV) 民視電視
  - FTV News
  - Follow Me TV
- Taiwan Broadcasting System (TBS) 台灣公共廣播電視集團
  - Chinese Television System (CTS) 中華電視
    - CTS Channel
    - CTS Education and Culture
    - CTS Recreation
  - Public Television Service (PTS) 公共電視
    - PTS TV3 Channel
    - Dimo TV

=== Other networks ===
- Taiwan Broadcasting System (TBS) 台灣公共廣播電視集團
  - Hakka Television 客家電視
  - Taiwan Indigenous Television 原住民族電視

=== Premium networks ===
- Beautiful Life Television (BLTV) 人間衛視
  - Beautiful Life Television Channel
- DaAi Television (DaAiTV) 大愛衛星電視
  - DaAi Television 1
  - DaAi Television 2
- EPili Network 霹靂台灣台
  - PiliTV
- GOOD TV (GOOD) 好消息衛星電視台
  - GOOD TV 1
  - GOOD TV 2
- Momo Shopping Television (MOMO) MOMO購物台
  - MOMO Kids
  - MOMO Shopping Television 1
  - MOMO Shopping Television 2
  - MOMO Shopping Television 3
- Gala Television (GTV) 八大電視
  - GTV One
  - GTV Variety Show
  - GTV Drama
  - GTV K Channel
- Sanlih E-Television (SET) 三立電視
  - SET International
  - SET Taiwan
  - SET News
  - SET Metro
- STAR TV (STAR) 星空傳媒
  - STAR Chinese Channel
  - STAR Chinese Movies
  - STAR Movies
  - National Geographic Channel
  - STAR World
- Eastern Television (ETTV) 東森電視
  - ETTV Variety
  - ETTV News
  - EBC Financial News
  - ETTV Drama
  - ETTV Movie
  - ETTV Foreign Movie
  - ETTV Shopping 1
  - ETTV Shopping 2
  - ETTV Shopping 3
  - ETTV Shopping 4
  - ETTV Shopping 5
  - ETTV Yoyo
  - ETTV America
  - ETTV Asia
  - ETTV China
  - ETTV Global
  - ET Today
- Get Television (GT) 高點電視
  - Get Varsity
  - Get Leisure
- Japan Entertainment Television (JET TV) JET綜合
  - JET TV
  - JET TV International
- Era Television (Era) 年代電視
  - Era News
  - Era Varsity
  - Much TV
  - Azio TV
  - Azio TV Asia
- Chung T'ien Television (CTi)
  - CTi Variety
  - CTi News
  - CTi Entertainment
  - CTi International
  - CTi Satellite Channel
- TVBS 無線衛星電視台
  - TVBS Channel
  - TVBS Joy Channel
  - TVBS-NEWS
  - TVBS-Asia
- Unique Business News (UBN) 非凡電視
  - UBN News
  - UBN Business
- VIVA Shopping (VIVA) VIVA購物頻道
  - VIVA Shopping Channel
- Hollywood Movie 好萊塢電影
  - Hollywood Movie Channel
- Videoland Television Network (VTN) 緯來電視網
  - Videoland Japan
  - Videoland Sports
  - Videoland Movie
  - Videoland General Entertainment Channel (On-TV)
  - Videoland Drama
  - Videoland Max-TV
  - LS Time TV
- Gold Sun Television (GSTV) 國興衛視
  - GSTV Channel
- SBN Global Finance (SBN)
  - SBN Global Finance Channel
- CSTV 華人商業
  - CSTV Drama
  - CSTV Afa
  - CSTV Travel Asia
- Hang Seng Finance (HSF) 恆生財經
  - Hang Seng Finance Channel
- Universal Culture Television (UCTV) 法界衛星
  - UCTV Channel
- Buddha Compassion Television Station (BTS) 佛衛電視慈悲台
  - BTS Channel
- 5888 Media Financial Network 5888影音理財網
  - 5888MFN Channel
- Hwazan-World Television 華藏世界衛視
  - Hwazan Satellite Television
  - World Television
- Z Television
  - Z Channel
  - Z2 Channel
- Network Broadcasting Television (NBTV) 生命電視
  - NBTV
- TACT Television (TACT) 台灣藝術
  - TACT TV Channel
- Finance Television 財訊財經
  - FinanceTV Channel
- No.i 冠軍電視
  - No.i Channel
- noi Television (noiTV) 運通財經
  - noiTV Channel
- CSTV 中華財經
  - CSTV Channel
- Mirror TV Broadcasting 鏡電視
  - Mnews Channel

== Malaysia ==
- 8TV
- Astro Wah Lai Toi On Demand
- Astro QJ HD
- iQIYI HD
- Astro AEC HD
- Astro Hua Hee Dai HD
- Astro Xiao Tai Yang On Demand
- Astro AOD (TVB dramas aired simultaneously with Hong Kong TVB main in HD)
- Enjoy TV5
- TVB Jade HD

== Singapore ==
Mediacorp Free-to-Air:

- Mediacorp Channel U HD
- Mediacorp Channel 8 HD

StarHub Pay TV:

- Hub Drama First
- Hub VV Drama
- E City

Singtel Pay TV:

- Jia Le Channel
- e-Le
- Ju Le Cool

== Other Asian countries ==
Country	Name	Owner	Notes
Indonesia	Metro TV	Media Group	Some Chinese programmes with Indonesian subtitles
Indonesia	DAAI TV		Some Taiwanese Mandarin and Taiwanese Hokkien programmes with Indonesian subtitles
Japan	TVB DAIFU		Cantonese programmes with Japanese subtitles
Philippines	TeleAsia		Closed on 17 September 2015
South Korea	Chunghwa TV		Chinese programmes with Korean subtitles
South Korea	TVB Korea Channel		Cantonese programmes with Korean subtitles
Thailand	Thai Central Chinese Television	Hunan-based Chinese Universe Media owns 49% of stock	only bilingual (Chinese and Thai language) Thai TV company operating satellite programming
Vietnam	VTV4	Vietnam Television	Bulletin only

Most of the television channels in Indonesia show foreign content with no dubbing, including Chinese language programs.

== Australia ==
Name	Owner	Notes
SBS TV	Government of Australia	News in world languages (including Mandarin and Cantonese) once a day and international movies
Channel 31 Melbourne	Melbourne Community Television Consortium	Selected programs only
Jadeworld	TVBI	

== New Zealand ==
- CTV1
- CTV2
- CTV3
- CTV4 (Phoenix TV Chinese Channel)
- CTV5
- CTV6 (CCTV-4)
- CTV7
- CTV8 (Free-To-Air Auckland UHF Channel 62)

== United States ==
=== Subscription networks ===
- Asia Television (ATV Home channel)
- Phoenix Television
- Television Broadcasts Limited (TVB USA) Jadeworld East, Jadeworld West, San Francisco, Los Angeles channels

=== Houston free-to-air networks ===
- KVQT-LD - Channel 21
  - New Tang Dynasty Television - 21.7 新唐人电視 (NTDTV)
  - STV - 21.8

=== Los Angeles free-to-air networks ===
- KVMD - Channel 31
  - iCitiTV - 31.3
  - WCETV - 31.8 銀視數碼台
- KMEX - Channel 34
  - 超视台 - 34.5 超視美洲頻道
- KXLA - Channel 44
  - Sky Link TV - 44.3 天下衛視 國語
  - Sky Link TV - 44.4 天下衛視 粵語
  - New Tang Dynasty Television - 44.7 新唐人电視 (NTDTV)
- KJLA - Channel 57
  - Zhong Want TV - 57.9 中旺電視(ZWTV)

=== New York City free-to-air networks ===
- WMBC-TV - Channel 63
  - New Tang Dynasty Television - 63.5 新唐人电視 (NTDTV)

=== San Francisco free-to-air networks ===
- KTSF - Channel 26
  - KTSF Channel - 26 KTSF
  - 26.3 KTSF News
- KMTP-TV - Channel 32
  - New Tang Dynasty Television - 32.5 新唐人电視 (NTDTV)
- KCNS-TV - Channel 38
  - Sky Link TV - 38.2 天下衛視
- Other/iPad
  - TVHS 1.9 - 北美宏星衛視 1.9

=== Sacramento free-to-air networks ===
- KBTV-CD - Channel 8
  - Crossings TV (12:00-2:30pm and 9:50-11:30pm Mon-Fri; Sat; 0:00-11:30pm 12:00-3:00pm and 10:00-11:30pm Sun)

=== Other ===
- Voice of America Chinese Branch

Global Dragon TV 环球龙视 - Washington DC, Northern VA and Maryland, Airs on Cox Cable 30 and channel 19

== Canada ==
Name	Owner	City
Fairchild TV	Fairchild Group	in Calgary, Toronto, Vancouver
Talentvision	Fairchild Group	in Vancouver, Available nationwide
LS Times TV	Waylen Group	Available nationwide
Omni Television	Rogers Communications	in Toronto, Edmonton, Calgary, Vancouver
ICI Television	Norouzi Family	in Montreal
CCCTV	Canada Global Media Investment Inc.	Available nationwide
WOWtv	Canadian Chinese Media Network	Available nationwide
New Tang Dynasty Television	New Tang Dynasty Television Canada	Available nationwide
Canada Chinese TV	Canada National TV Inc.	Available nationwide
Canada National TV	Canada National TV Inc.	Available nationwide

== Europe ==
- TVBS-Europe-5 channels based in the United Kingdom and broadcasting to 48 countries in Europe.
- Chinese Radio and TV based in Netherlands

== See also ==
- Lists of television channels
