= Television in Taiwan =

Television in Taiwan is primarily in Chinese and English. It is delivered through analog and digital, cable, IPTV, and the Internet.

== History ==
Television began in 1962 with the Network of Educational Television, followed by Taiwan Television (BET-21) on 10 October that year. By 1972, when there were three television stations in operation (TTV, CTV, CTS), one quarter of the national population (at the time estimated to be at 15 million) had a television set. It was, however, plagued by problems such as the spread of crime and violence, like what happened in the United States.

== Digital television ==
Digital television launched terrestrially throughout Taiwan on 1 July 2004, using the European DVB-T system. After years of simulcasting, Taiwan replaced American analogue broadcasting system NTSC with a digital system by 2014. The Republic of China Cabinet approved a measure mandating that all new televisions are to be equipped with a digital television tuner from 2006. The rule applied to TVs measuring between 21 and 29 inches in 2007, and to sets of all sizes in 2008. To assist lower-income families with the switch to digital television, the government provided NT$300 million in aid to purchase converters or for the purchase of new digital televisions. In February 2009, the National Communications Commission proposed amendments to the Cable Television Act; they include mandating cable companies to provide free set-top boxes.

=== HDTV ===
High-definition television broadcast was introduced to Taiwanese audiences with the trial run of HiHD, provided by Public Television Service.

== Cable television ==
Cable television was legalized in 1993.

Cable television is prevalent in Taiwan, as a result of cheap subscription rates (typically around NT$550, or US$15 a month) and the paucity of free-to-air television, which comprises four channels. Programming is mostly in Mandarin and Taiwanese, with some English, Japanese and other foreign-language channels. Miniseries, called Taiwanese drama, are popular and are being exported to markets mainly in East and Southeast Asia, and Latin America, with some dramas available on OTT platforms such as Netflix, YouTube, or Viki. There is a dedicated station for Taiwan's Hakka minority as well as the arrival in 2005 of an aboriginal channel. Almost all programs are in the original language with traditional Chinese subtitles.

== List of channels ==
=== Free-to-air ===
In Taiwan, there are six nationwide free-to-air television bouquets, as follows:

Name	Free-to-air channels	Owner	UHF channels (DVB-T)	Launched
China Television (CTV) 中國電視 (中視)	CTV Main Channel (CTV HD), CTV News, CTV Classic, CTV Bravo	China Television (CTV) 中國電視公司 (中視)	24 (533 MHz)	31 October 1969
Public Television Service (PTS) 公共電視 (公視)	PTS Main Channel (PTS HD), PTS Taigi, TaiwanPlus	Taiwan Broadcasting System (TBS) 台灣公共廣播電視集團 (公共電視文化事業基金會)	26 (545 MHz)	1 July 1998
Formosa Television (FTV) 民間全民電視／民視電視 (民視)	FTV Main Channel (FTV HD), FTV One, FTV News, FTV Taiwan	Formosa Television (FTV) 民間全民電視股份有限公司 (民視電視公司／民間全民電視公司)	28 (557 MHz)	11 June 1997
(Multiplex)	PTS XS, Hakka TV, TITV	Taiwan Broadcasting System (TBS) 台灣公共廣播電視集團 (公共電視文化事業基金會); Hakka TV 客家電視 (客視); Indigenous Peoples Cultural Foundation (IPCF) 原住民族文化事業基金會	30 (569 MHz)	1 July 2003
Taiwan Television (TTV) 台灣電視 (台視)	TTV Main Channel (TTV HD), TTV News, TTV Finance, TTV Variety	Taiwan Television (TTV) 臺灣電視公司 (台視)	32 (581 MHz)	10 October 1962
Chinese Television System (CTS) 中華電視 (華視)	CTS Main Channel (CTS HD), CTS News & Info, CTS Education, Sports & Culture, Parliamentary TV 1 & 2	Chinese Television System (CTS) 中華電視公司 (華視; 台灣公共廣播電視集團)	34 (593 MHz)	31 October 1971

=== Multichannel cable television platforms ===
- Chung T'ien Television
- Gala Television
- Sanlih E-Television
- TVBS
- Era Television
- Eastern Broadcasting Company
- JET TV
- Unique Business News
- Videoland Television Network
- Star Chinese Channel (defunct)

== Analog television ==
Taiwan terminated over-the-air analog broadcasting on 30 June 2012, and the remainder of the analog system ended in 2014, when the analog cable television broadcasts were terminated.

The first three free-to-air analogue terrestrial television stations, using the American NTSC system, were launched during the 1960s and 1970s:

- 10 October 1962 at 19:00 TST: the first free-to-air terrestrial television station Taiwan Television (TTV) was officially launched.
- 31 October 1969 at 18:30 TST: the second free-to-air terrestrial television station China Television (CTV) was officially launched.
- 31 October 1971 at 16:00 TST: the third free-to-air terrestrial television station Chinese Television System (CTS) was officially launched.

These three are collectively known as the Old Three stations.

In the late 1990s, two new free-to-air television channels were officially launched:

- Formosa Television (FTV), on 11 June 1997 at 18:00 TST.
- Public Television Service (PTS), on 1 July 1998 at 19:00 TST.

== See also ==
- Media in Taiwan
- List of Taiwanese television series
- List of Taiwanese dramas
- Censorship in Taiwan
- Press Freedom Index
