= List of Chinese-language radio stations =

This is a list of radio stations that broadcast in the Chinese language.

== East Asia ==
=== Mainland China ===
China Radio International (CRI) is a government controlled media outlet. Typical programs include Tang Ren Jie and others. The weather is typically announced for cities such as Beijing, Shanghai, Guangzhou, Guilin, Ürümqi, Xi'an, Hong Kong, Macau, and Taipei. International cities weather is usually announced for New York City, Washington, Seattle, Sydney, Bangkok, London, Paris, Madrid, Cairo, Nairobi, and others.

In Beijing, China Radio International can be heard at 88.7 MHz FM and 91.5 MHz FM and some other frequencies.

==== Beijing ====
Most Beijing radio stations are controlled by the Beijing Broadcasting Network (Beijing Renmin Guangbo Diantai). Radio frequencies such as 97.4 MHz FM is for music. Other Beijing radio stations include China Radio International's Easy FM on 88.7 MHz FM and 91.5 MHz FM.

Beijing Radio Stations
| Frequency | Description |
|---|---|
| 88.7 MHz FM | Easy FM |
| 92.1 MHz FM | |
| 97.4 MHz FM | Yinyue - Music |

==== Guangdong ====
Guangdong is home to Radio Guangdong and many other radio stations. The following list is incomplete:

Guangdong Radio Stations
| Frequency | Description |
|---|---|
| 99.3/93.9 MHz FM | Music FM |
| 103.6 MHz FM | Radio Guangdong Voice of the City |
| 91.4/91.8 MHz FM | Guangdong Radio |

==== Harbin ====
Harbin Economy Radio controls two of the radio stations in Harbin.

Harbin Economy Radio Stations
| Frequency | Description |
|---|---|
| 972 kHz AM | Local Harbin News |
| 92.5 MHz FM | Financial and Business News |

==== Lanzhou ====
Lanzhou's radio stations are controlled by the Lanzhou Radio group.

Lanzhou Radio Stations
| Frequency | Description |
|---|---|
| 954 kHz AM | News |
| 97.3 MHz FM | News |
| 99.5 MHz FM | Music |
| 100.8 MHz FM | Live (Talk) |

==== Nanjing ====
Nanjing's radio stations are primarily controlled by Nanjing Radio, a subsidiary of Nanjing Television Broadcast Group. The channels contain a variety of programming including local news, business, sports, a kids channel, traffic, and music.

Nanjing Radio Stations
Description
Comprehensive News Channel (O1)
Education Channel (O5)
Film/Television Channel (O2)
Literature Channel (O3)
Lifestyle Channel (O4)
Kids Channel (O7)
Nanjing News (Xinwen) Channel (NJXWT)
Nanjing Economy Channel (NJJJT1)
Nanjing Sports Channel (NJJJT2)
Nanjing Music (Yin Yue) Channel (NJYYT)
Nanjing Traffic (Jiao Tong) Channel (NJJTT)

==== Shanghai ====
The Shanghai Media Group, part of the Shanghai Media & Entertainment Group conglomerate controls a fair number of radio stations in Shanghai. The radio stations broadcast local news, traffic, music (popular, classical, and light), and a variety of other programs.

Shanghai Media Group Radio Stations
| Frequency/Internet | Description |
|---|---|
| 990 kHz AM | News |
| 648 kHz AM | Traffic |
| 1296 kHz AM | Eastern China Regional News |
| 792 kHz AM | Shanghai Local News |
| 101.7 MHz FM | Popular Music |
| 103.7 MHz FM | Love Music |
| 94.7 MHz FM | Classical Music (Jingdian947) |
| 97.7 MHz FM | Economic/Business News |
| 96.8 MHz FM | Comedy Channel |
| 1197 kHz AM | Marine Channel |
| 94.0 MHz FM | Sports News |

==== Shenzhen ====
Shenzhen Radio Station controls four of several radio stations in Shenzhen.

Shenzhen Radio Stations
| Frequency | Description |
|---|---|
| 89.8 MHz FM | News |
| 97.1 MHz FM | Music |
| 106.2 MHz FM | Traffic |
| 94.2 MHz FM | Love Radio |

==== Tianjin ====
Tianjin's radio stations are controlled by the Tianjin People's Broadcasting Station with a variety of programs including news, traffic, music and others.

Tianjin Radio Stations
| Frequency | Description |
|---|---|
| 97.2 MHz FM | News |
| 909 kHz AM | News |
| 106.8 MHz FM | Traffic |
| 567 kHz AM | Traffic |
| 104.6 MHz FM | Literature |
| 101.4 MHz FM | Economical News |
| 1071 kHz AM | Music |
| 99.0 MHz FM | Music |
| 1008 kHz AM | Music |
| 91.1 MHz FM | Life Radio |
| 1386 kHz AM | Life Radio |
| 92.0 MHz FM | Binhai Radio |
| 747 kHz AM | Binhai Radio |
| 87.8 MHz FM | Entertainment |
| 666 kHz AM | Novel Radio |

==== Urumqi ====
Ürümqi's radio stations are controlled by the Urumqi People Broadcasting Station group.

Ürümqi People Radio Stations
| Frequency | Description |
|---|---|
| 792 kHz AM | Ürümqi News |
| 927 kHz AM | Health News |
| 97.4 MHz FM | Music |
| 100.7 MHz FM | Literature |
| 106.5 MHz FM | Travelling and Entertainment News |

==== Xi'an ====
Xi'an's radio stations are controlled by Jin Hao. Programs include news, music, and fashion on at least seven radio stations.

=== Hong Kong ===
- Commercial Radio Hong Kong broadcasts at 88.1 FM (talk), 90.3 FM (Cantonese pop, youth), and 864 AM (English).
- Metro Broadcast Corporation Limited consists of 3 radio channels: Metro Finance (FM104), Metro Showbiz (FM99.7) and Metro Plus (AM 1044).
- Radio Television Hong Kong (RTHK):

| Channel | Modulation | Frequency | Language | Features |
|---|---|---|---|---|
| RTHK Radio 1 | FM | 92.6 MHz; 92.9 MHz; 93.2 MHz; 93.4 MHz; 93.5 MHz; 93.6 MHz; 94.4 MHz | Cantonese | news, information, phone-in programmes, and general programming |
| RTHK Radio 2 | FM | 94.8 MHz; 95.3 MHz; 95.6 MHz; 96.0 MHz; 96.3 MHz; 96.4 MHz; 96.9 MHz | Cantonese | programmes aimed at youth, entertainment and popular music, promotion of community projects, HKEAA's HKALE Chinese language and culture and use of English and HKCEE English listening examinations broadcast through this channel during the examination period of April and May |
| RTHK Radio 4 | FM | 97.6 MHz; 97.8 MHz; 98.1 MHz; 98.2 MHz; 98.4 MHz; 98.7 MHz; 98.9 MHz | English (mainly), Cantonese (some) | classical music and fine arts |
| RTHK Radio 5 | AM | 783 kHz | Cantonese (mainly), Mandarin (some) | programming aimed at the elderly, also culture and education |
| RTHK Putonghua | AM | 621 kHz | Standard Mandarin (mainly, some Cantonese) | general programming, news and finance |

=== Macau ===
- Rádio Macau broadcasts in Cantonese on FM 100.7 MHz.
- Radio Vilaverde Lda broadcasts in Cantonese on FM 99.5 MHz.

Macau Radio Stations
| Frequency | Description |
|---|---|
| 100.7 MHz FM | News, Adult Contemporary, Cantopop, and General Programming |
| 99.5 MHz FM | Adult Contemporary, Chinese pop, Cantopop |

=== Taiwan ===
- BCC is the largest radio network company in Taiwan.
- Radio Taiwan International broadcasts news about Taiwan in Mandarin, Cantonese, English, Spanish, French, and many other languages.
- KISS Radio plays mostly Chinese popular music and English top 40.
- Hit Fm in Taiwan also plays Chinese popular music

== Southeast Asia ==
=== Brunei ===
There are currently no FM radio stations in Brunei that are fully operated in Chinese. The daily Chinese programs for Pilihan FM is between 09:00-11:00 in the morning, and between 16:00-19:00 at night.

- Radio Television Brunei
  - Pilihan FM (95.9FM/96.9FM)

=== Indonesia ===
Most of the Indonesia FM radio stations indicated below are not fully operated in Chinese.

==== Jakarta ====
- Mandarin Station 98.3 FM
- Sunday Mandarin PAS FM

==== Bandung ====
- Suara Indah 美声 92.1FM

==== Medan ====
- City Radio 城市之音, 95.9 MHz FM

==== Surabaya ====
- Global Mandarin@Global FM

==== Semarang ====
- PAS FM (Sunday Mandarin) 106.00

==== Palembang ====
- El John Radio, 95.9 MHz FM

==== Pangkal Pinang ====
- Palupi 华语广播电台 FM, 103.5;MHz FM
- El John Radio, 88.5 MHz FM

==== Pontianak ====
- Primadona FM, 99.1 MHz FM

=== Malaysia ===
- 988 FM
- Ai FM
- City Plus FM
- goXuan
- Melody
- My
- Eight FM
- TEA FM (content is 60% Chinese and 40% English)

=== Singapore ===
There are three licensed broadcasters of terrestrial radio in Singapore, offering a total of 6 Chinese-language FM radio stations. The national public broadcaster, Mediacorp Radio operates 3 stations, the media organisation SPH Media Trust manages 2 radio stations, and So Drama! Entertainment owns the remaining Chinese radio station. All of the radio stations are fully operated in Chinese and provide around-the-clock service. They broadcast a wide variety of programs, including news, music, infotainment and Public Service Announcements to inform, educate and entertain all audiences.

- So Drama! Entertainment
  - 88.3Jia
- SPH Media Trust
  - 96.3 Hao FM
  - UFM 100.3
- Mediacorp Radio
  - YES 933
  - Capital 958
  - Love 972

Singapore Chinese Radio Stations
| Frequency | Description |
|---|---|
| 88.3 MHz FM | Adult Contemporary, Mandopop, K-pop, infotainment |
| 93.3 MHz FM | Mandopop, CHR/Pop, Top 40 |
| 95.8 MHz FM | Talk radio, News and Finance, Classic hits, Oldies |
| 96.3 MHz FM | Classic Chinese hits from 80s to 90s, General Programming |
| 97.2 MHz FM | Adult Contemporary, Chinese pop, General Programming |
| 100.3 MHz FM | Adult Contemporary, Chinese pop, General Programming |

== Oceania ==
=== Australia ===
- SBS Radio broadcasts two hour-long daily programmes for the Chinese audience in Australia: one programme in Mandarin and one programme in Cantonese.
- Perth Chinese Radio 104.9 FM, located in Perth, broadcasts in Mandarin and Cantonese 24/7 and was established in 2007.
- 3ACR AM 1629 Radio is located in Melbourne, and founded in 2011. The station targets local Chinese Australians and airs mainly news, cultural and other programs.

=== New Zealand ===
- AM936
- New Zealand Chinese Radio FM 90.6
- Love FM 99.4

== Europe ==
=== France ===
- Radio France Internationale
- Radio Mandarin d'Europe

=== Germany ===
- Deutsche Welle

=== Romania ===
- Radio Romania International

=== Russia ===
- Sputnik

=== United Kingdom ===
- BBC Radio Merseyside Orient Express, LiverpoolBroadcasts an English show and plays Cantonese music on Mondays 9-10pm with June Yee and Billy Hui. Broadcast since 1980s.
- Unity 101 Under The Same Sky, Southampton Broadcasts in Mandarin on Mondays 6pm-8pm.

=== Vatican ===
- Vatican Radio

== Americas ==
=== Canada ===
There are a number of stations well known within the Chinese community in Canada that contain a certain number of programs in Chinese. However, due to the ethnic broadcasting policy made by the CRTC, there are currently no AM/FM radio stations in Canada that are fully operated in Chinese. Also, campus radios in Canada allows broadcasting their program in any language, including Chinese, but not a lot of them are known to the public.

- Fairchild Radio, which is owned by Fairchild Group, is the biggest Chinese broadcasting company in Canada and produces Chinese programs in the following stations:
  - Calgary: FM 94.7
  - Toronto: AM 1430 and FM 88.9
  - Vancouver: FM 96.1
- There are other stations which air Chinese programs in the following region:
  - Ottawa: FM 97.9 - Owned and operated by CHIN Radio/TV International
  - Toronto: FM 91.9/100.7 "Sing Tao A1 Chinese Radio"
  - Markham: FM 105.9
  - Vancouver: AM 1320 "Overseas Chinese Voice" - Owned and operated by Mainstream Broadcasting Corporation

=== United States ===
- Chinese Radio Seattle. (Mon-Thur 9:00pm–12:00am Fri-Sun 6:00pm-12:00am AM1150 KKNW/HD-3 FM 98.9/Mobile App: Chinese Radio Seattle) Studio in Bellevue, WA.
- China Radio International can be heard in the following cities:
  - Washington DC on WUST (AM 1120 kHz between 9 a.m.–11 a.m.)
- Chinese American Voice, heard over a SCA subcarrier of WACD-FM in the New York/New Jersey/Connecticut tri-state area
- Chinese American Voice, heard in New York City 24 hours on the 92 kHz subcarrier of WQCD-FM 101.9 MHz.
- Chinese Radio Network on WGBB (AM 1240 kHz and the 67 kHz subcarrier of WCBS-FM 101.1 MHz, Flushing, New York) broadcasts in Mandarin.
- Chung Wah Chinese Broadcasting Company heard in New York City 24 hours on the 92 kHz subcarrier of WSKQ-FM 97.9 MHz.
- Multicultural Radio Broadcasting Inc.'s Chinese Media Group broadcasts Chinese programming in the following cities:
  - KAHZ, Los Angeles is a Mandarin-dialect station.
  - KAZN, Los Angeles is a Mandarin-dialect station.
  - KTWR, Guam is a shortwave radio station that broadcasts in Mandarin and other languages to the Asia-Pacific region.
  - KMRB, Los Angeles is a Cantonese-dialect station.
  - Sinocast Radio, national Chinese network, heard in New York City on the 67 kHz subcarrier of WXRK-FM 92.3 MHz.
  - WKDM, New York/New Jersey/Connecticut tri-state area is a Mandarin-dialect station on AM 1380 kHz.
  - WZRC, New York/New Jersey/Connecticut tri-state area is a Cantonese-dialect station on AM 1480 kHz.
- Radio Taiwan International is broadcast on WYFR from Okeechobee, Florida on shortwave 5950 kHz in the United States sometime after 5 p.m./6 p.m. until early morning. This broadcast can be received virtually through the entire United States using a short wave radio.
- KVTO (Sing Tao) on 1400AM in San Francisco.
  - KEST, San Francisco is a Cantonese-dialect station.
  - KSQQ, San Francisco is a Mandarin-dialect station.

== Africa ==
=== Kenya ===
- China Radio International is at 91.9 MHz FM in Nairobi.

=== South Africa ===
- ArrowLine Chinese Radio (www.ArrowLineRadio.com) is on AM 1269 in Johannesburg

== See also ==
- Media in China
- Ethnic broadcasting in China
- Media in Hong Kong
- Media of Taiwan
- Media of Macau
