= Television in China (disambiguation) =

Television in China may refer to:

- Television in the People's Republic of China, for Mainland China, also including the Hong Kong and Macau Special Administrative Regions
- Television in the Republic of China, for the country commonly known as Taiwan

== See also ==
- China Television
- Chinese Television System
