= NBN =

NBN or nbn may refer to:

== Broadcasting networks ==
- National Black Network, US radio network
- National Broadcasting Network (Lebanon)
- National Broadcasting Network (Trinidad and Tobago)
- Nagoya Broadcasting Network, Japan
- Nanjing Broadcasting Network, China
- NBN Television, New South Wales, Australia
- Newsounds Broadcasting Network a Filipino radio network, managed by Bombo Radyo Philippines
- People's Television Network, Philippines, formerly National Broadcasting Network

== Organizations ==
- Bureau of Normalization, Belgium
- National Biodiversity Network, UK
- NBN Co, a.k.a. nbn, Australian Government corporation responsible for National Broadband Network
- Nefesh B'Nefesh, Israeli organization encouraging immigration

== Publications ==
- North by Northwestern, magazine of Northwestern University, US

== Other ==
- Annobón Airport, Equatorial Guinea (IATA code)
- National Bingo Night (disambiguation), a game show in several countries
- National Bibliography Number, several publication identifier systems
- National Broadband Network, Australian national wholesale open-access data network
- New Brighton railway station, England, National Rail station code
- Nibrin, a protein
- Niobium nitride (NbN)
- North Brighton railway station, Melbourne
