= Shanghai Synergy Culture & Entertainment Group =

Shanghai Synergy Culture & Entertainment Group (SSCEG)
- Industry: Music Entertainment; Media
- Headquarters: Shanghai, People's Republic of China
- Area served: Shanghai; Greater China
- Key people: Qin Gu (President); Bill Zang (Vice President)
- Owner: Shanghai Media & Entertainment Group
- Website: www.ssceg.com

Shanghai Synergy Culture & Entertainment Group (SSCEG) (Shanghai Synergy) is a music entertainment and media company headquartered in Shanghai, China. It is owned by one of the largest media conglomerates in China—Shanghai Media & Entertainment Group (SMEG). Reorganization of SMEG resulted in the creation of Shanghai Synergy (SSCEG) and its sister company Shanghai Media Group (SMG). Shanghai Synergy is the largest music industry media group, distributor, and retail outlet in China.

== Operations ==
In 2007, SSCEG merged several record labels, CD pressing plants, e-games, animation, and television production companies.

Shanghai Synergy Group Subsidiaries
Company
Shanghai New Sony (Sony BMG Joint Venture)
Shanghai Audio Visual Company
Shanghai Audio Visual Press
Shanghai Audio Visual Electronic Press
Shanghai Gold Statue Optical Disk Manufacturing
Shanghai Century Chinese Creation Cultural Image Management
Shanghai Red Motion Digital Technology

Shanghai Synergy has licensed and distributed international artists from the four "major label" companies; other major labels SSCEG has signed contracts with include Disney, Rock Records, and Avex Group.

== Recent developments ==
=== a-Peer Synergy Joint Venture ===
In 2008, Shanghai Synergy and a-Peer Holding Group, a U.S. music and media technology company, announced a new joint business venture—a-Peer Synergy Shanghai Culture and Technology Company (a-Peer Synergy). The new venture will create new market opportunities and revenue for international artists entering the China market and Chinese talent expanding into the world market.

a-Peer Synergy business is based on a combination of SSCEG's physical platform with a-Peer Holding's digital platform.

President of a-Peer Synergy is Bill Zang and its CEO is Thomas Olscheske, Ph.D.

=== Blu-ray Manufacturing ===
In 2009, Shanghai Synergy (SSCEG), Shanghai Jingwen, and Sony jointly invested in China's first Blu-ray Disc production line located in Shanghai. The Blu-ray disc plant is located in the Songjiang Industrial Zone. With advanced Blu-ray disc manufacturing equipment, the plant has an estimated monthly production capacity of 500,000 discs.

It is speculated that the launch of this production line in Shanghai represents the completion of China's Blu-ray industry chain.
