= Taiwan Broadcasting System =

Taiwanese public broadcasting group

- Type: Broadcast radio and television
- Branding: TBS
- Country: Republic of China (Taiwan)
- First air date: 1 July 2006
- Availability: National; International
- Owner: Public Television Service, Chinese Television System
- Official website: Official website (Archive)

Taiwan Broadcasting System (TBS; Chinese: 台灣公共廣播電視集團), founded 1 July 2006, is a public broadcasting group that operates 8 television channels in Taiwan. It also owns 2 (CTS and PTS) of the five major Taiwan television networks (the other are TTV, CTV and FTV).

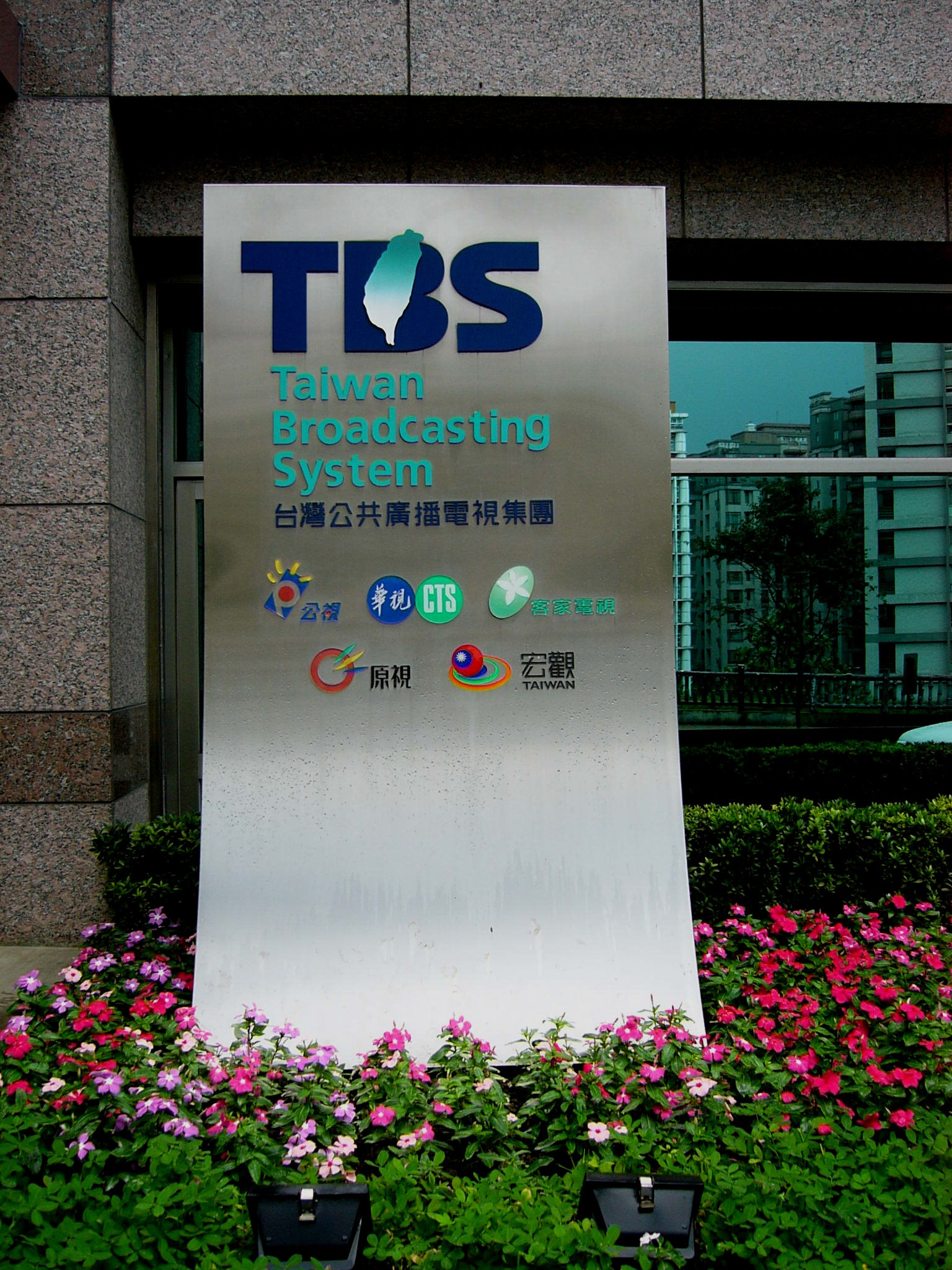
TBS plate at Public Television Service A Building

== Channels ==
- CTS
  - CTS Main Channel
  - CTS Education, Sports and Culture
  - CTS News and Information
  - Parliamentary Channel
- PTS
  - PTS Main Channel
  - PTS Taigi
  - PTS XS
  - TaiwanPlus
- Hakka TV
