= Nanjing Broadcasting System =

Chinese television network

Nanjing Broadcasting System (Chinese: 南京广播电视台, Simply as NBS) And Nanjing Broadcasting System Group (Chinese: 南京广播电视集团, Lit: Nanjing Radio And Television Broadcasting Group, Simply as NBSG or NBS GROUP), is a Regional broadcaster in the Nanjing, China area. It is the owner of the Nanjing Radio (RNJ), Nanjing Television (NJTV), Nanjing Broadcasting Network and Nanjing Education and Technology Channel.

== History ==
NBS set up its radio station on 1 January 1979. Initially, it was operated by the Nanjing Radio Corporation and was later granted to a subordinate unit of the Municipal Council of Nanjing of the Chinese Communist Party. It operates six radio stations (three on AM and FM, three only on FM) and is also responsible for a radio station in Liuhe District.

The television company was established on 17 January 1980 and began test broadcasts on 4 February 1981. It became the first city-level television station established in a provincial capital in China and delivered its signal on VHF channel 12.

Its current logo, a leaf resembling an uppercase N, was introduced at 12pm on 18 January 2013, replacing its logo representing a demon. The company's rationale was derived from Nanjing's urban positioning as a "modern, international, cultural and green" city.
