= TYSND1 =

Protein-coding gene in the species Homo sapiens

Identifiers
- Aliases: TYSND1, NET41, trypsin domain containing 1, trypsin like peroxisomal matrix peptidase 1
- External IDs: OMIM: 611017; MGI: 1919017; HomoloGene: 87946; GeneCards: TYSND1; OMA:TYSND1 - orthologs

Gene location (Human)
Chr.	Chromosome 10 (human)
Band	10q22.1	Start	70,137,981 bp
Band	10q22.1	End	70,146,700 bp

Gene location (Mouse)
Chr.	Chromosome 10 (mouse)
Band	10|10 B4	Start	61,531,293 bp
Band	10|10 B4	End	61,538,552 bp
RNA expression pattern
Bgee	Human / Mouse (ortholog); Top expressed in: left testis; right testis; skin of abdomen; skin of leg; mucosa of transverse colon; granulocyte; right adrenal gland; right lobe of liver; right lobe of thyroid gland; left adrenal gland / Top expressed in: right kidney; proximal tubule; left lobe of liver; brown adipose tissue; internal carotid artery; human kidney; adrenal gland; external carotid artery; ankle joint; duodenum; More reference expression data
BioGPS	n/a
Gene ontology
Molecular function	protease binding; peptidase activity; serine-type peptidase activity; hydrolase activity; identical protein binding; serine-type endopeptidase activity
Cellular component	peroxisome; membrane; peroxisomal matrix; cytosol
Biological process	protein processing; regulation of fatty acid beta-oxidation; protein homooligomerization; proteolysis; protein targeting to peroxisome
Sources:Amigo / QuickGO
Orthologs
Species	Human	Mouse
Entrez	219743	71767
Ensembl	ENSG00000156521	ENSMUSG00000020087
UniProt	Q2T9J0	Q9DBA6
RefSeq (mRNA)	NM_001040273; NM_173555	NM_001272090; NM_001272091; NM_001272092; NM_027912
RefSeq (protein)	NP_001035363; NP_775826	NP_001259019; NP_001259020; NP_001259021; NP_082188
Location (UCSC)	Chr 10: 70.14 – 70.15 Mb	Chr 10: 61.53 – 61.54 Mb
PubMed search
- Wikidata
View/Edit Human	View/Edit Mouse

Trypsin domain containing 1 is a protein that in humans is encoded by the TYSND1 gene.

== Function ==
This gene encodes a protease that removes the N-terminal peroxisomal targeting signal (PTS2) from proteins produced in the cytosol, thereby facilitating their import into the peroxisome.

The encoded protein is also capable of cleaving several proteins targeted to peroxisomes through the C-terminal peroxisomal targeting signal (PTS1). The full-length protein undergoes self-cleavage to produce shorter, potentially inactive fragments. Alternative splicing results in multiple transcript variants for this gene.
