= Shanghai Oriental Pearl Media =

- Type: Public
- Traded as: SSE: 600637; SSE MidCap Component
- Industry: Tourism and Media
- Founded: 1992; 34 years ago
- Headquarters: Shanghai, China
- Area served: People's Republic of China
- Key people: President: Mr. Xue Peijian
- Parent: Shanghai Media & Entertainment Group
- Website: www.opg.cn

Shanghai Oriental Pearl Media is a cultural company engaged in touring (including operations and management of Oriental Pearl Tower), radio and TV transmission service, media investments & advertising operations, video game console manufacturing and software development; and real estate investments. It is listed as one of the 50 pivotal large-scale enterprises by the Shanghai government.

In late May 2014, the company announced it was forming two joint ventures with Sony to develop video game consoles and software in China. The two joint venture companies were to be established in the Shanghai Free-Trade Zone by a subsidiary of Shanghai Oriental Pearl and by Sony's China arm Sony Computer Entertainment (SCE) Shanghai. The company will own a 30% stake in one JV, and 51% in the other.

The company was removed from SSE 50 Index in May 2017, but remained in SSE 180 Index.
