= Classical 94.7 =

Classical music radio station in Shanghai

Classical 94.7 上海人民广播电台经典音乐广播 经典947
Shanghai; China
- Frequency: 94.7 MHz

Programming
- Format: Classical music

Ownership
- Owner: Shanghai Media Group

History
- First air date: 2004

Links
- Website: Classical 94.7 on the SMG website

Classical 94.7 (经典947) is a classical music radio station in Shanghai, China. It is owned and operated by the Shanghai Media Group and is the only classical music radio station in mainland China.

== History ==
In 2014, the station entered into a cultural exchange with Chicago's WFMT; underwritten by Abbott Laboratories, which operates in China, the exchange saw Classical 94.7 air programming supplied by WFMT on Friday evenings and WFMT producers travel to China to record performances at the Shanghai Spring International Music Festival.

== See also ==
- List of radio stations in China
