= China Meteorological Administration =

Meteorological agency of the People's Republic of China

- 中国气象局; Zhōngguó Qìxiàng Jú
- Logo of CMA

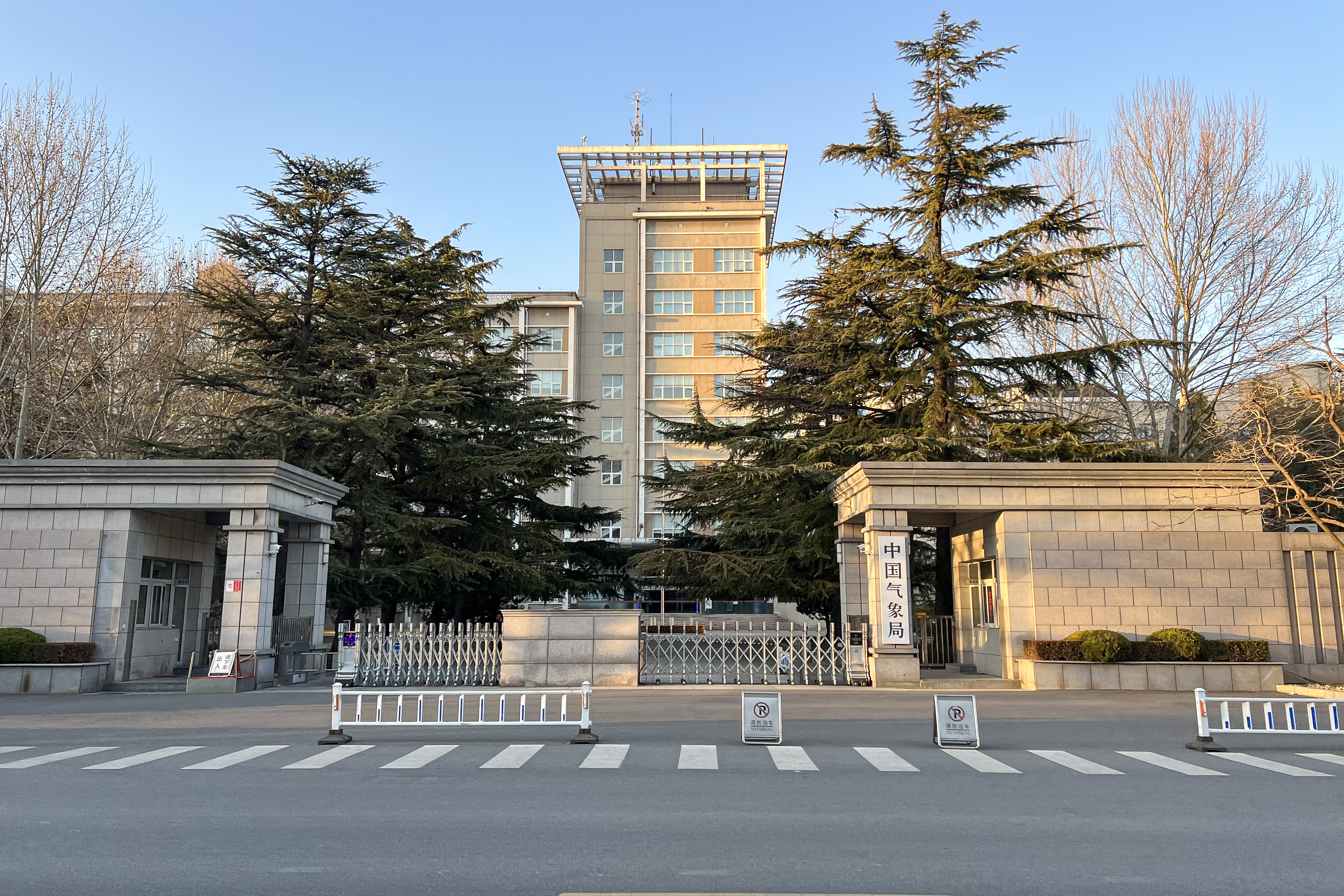
- Headquarters of CMA

Agency overview
- Formed: December 8, 1949; 76 years ago
- Superseding agency: Central Military Commission Meteorological Bureau Central Weather Bureau
- Jurisdiction: Mainland China
- Headquarters: Beijing
- Minister responsible: Chen Zhenlin, Director
- Parent agency: State Council
- Website: cma.gov.cn

China Meteorological Administration
- Simplified Chinese: 中国气象局
- Traditional Chinese: 中國氣象局
Transcriptions
Standard Mandarin
- Hanyu Pinyin: Zhōngguó Qìxiàng Jú

The China Meteorological Administration (CMA) is the national weather service of the People's Republic of China. The institution is located in Beijing.

== History ==
The agency was originally established in December 1949 as the Central Military Commission Meteorological Bureau. It replaced the Central Weather Bureau formed in 1941. In 1994, the CMA was transformed from a subordinate governmental body into one of the public service agencies under the State Council.

Meteorological bureaus are established in 31 provinces, autonomous regions and municipalities, excluding meteorological services at Hong Kong, Macau and Taiwan. 14 meteorological bureaus at sub-provincial cities including 4 cities which have been specifically designated in the state development plan), 318 meteorological bureaus at prefecture level and 2,300 bureaus (stations) at county level.

== Subordinate bodies under the CMA ==
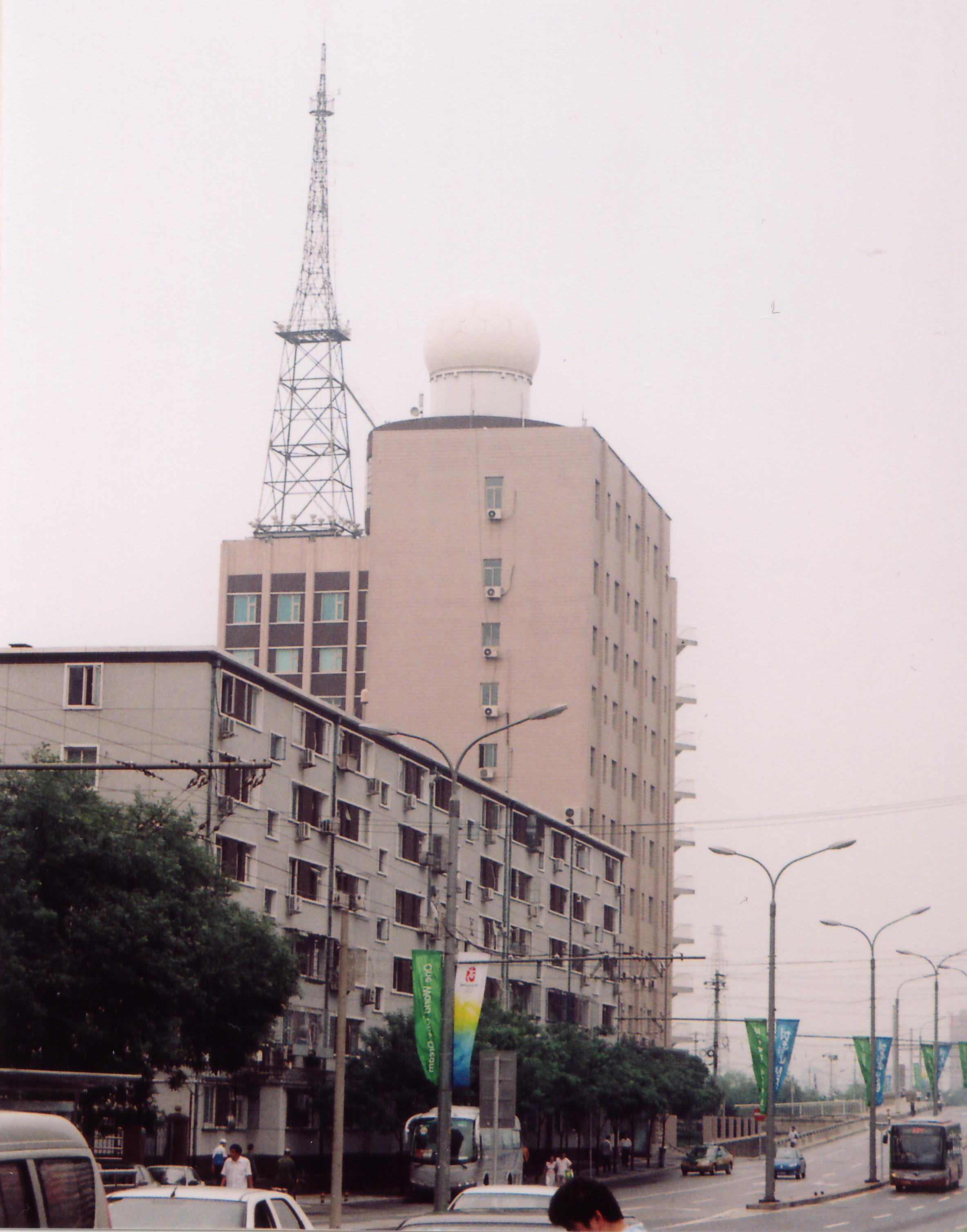
Beijing Meteorological Bureau, the capital weather forecasting office

- National Meteorological Center (the Central Meteorological Observatory)
- National Satellite Meteorological Centre (National Centre for Space Weather Monitoring and Warning)
- National Climate Center
- National Meteorological Information Centre
- Chinese Academy of Meteorological Sciences
- Meteorological Observation Center
- China Meteorological Administration Training Centre
- Department of Capital Construction & Real Estate Management
- Logistic Service Centre
- Audio-Visual Publicity Center
- China Meteorological News Press, and Meteorological Press.
- China Weather TV

== See also ==
The Special Administrative Regions operate their own meteorological units outside of CMA:

- Hong Kong Observatory
- Meteorological and Geophysical Bureau
