= Jin Hao =

China
- Broadcast area: Xi'an, China
- Frequencies: Internet, AM, and FM

Programming
- Format: various

History
- First air date: ?

Links
- Website: http://www.sxradio.com.cn/

Jin Hao, (Chinese: 金号; pinyin: Jīnhào), which translates to "Gold Number", is a group of radio stations in Shaanxi, China serving Xi'an, China and the greater provincial area.
