= China Weather TV =

China Weather Television
- Country: China

Programming
- Language: Chinese

Ownership
- Owner: China Meteorological Administration

History
- Launched: May 18, 2006

Links
- Website: www.weathertv.cn

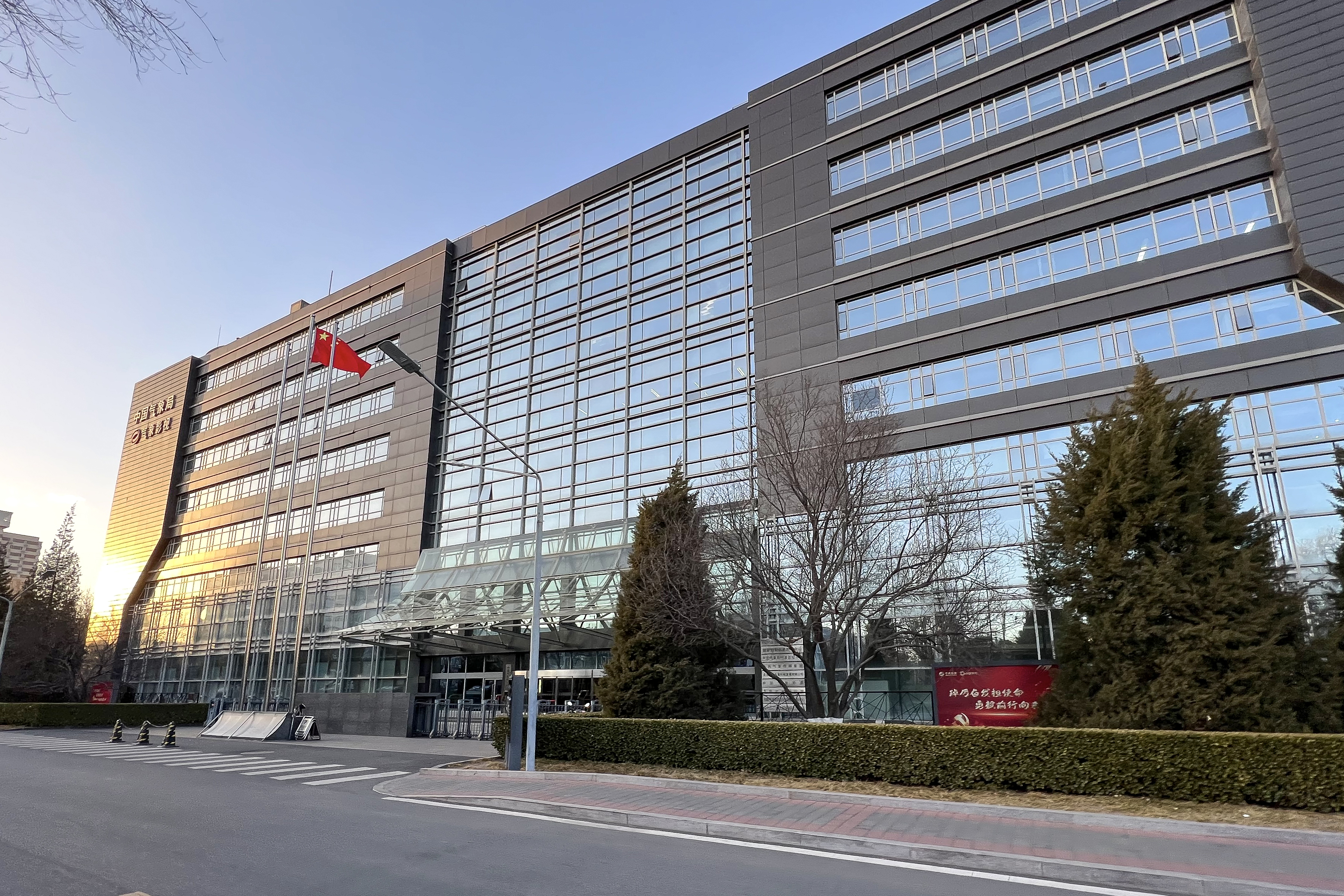
Headquarters

China Weather TV (Chinese: 中国天气频道; pinyin: Zhōngguó tiānqì píndào) is a TV channel that was established by China Meteorological Administration in May 2006. The channel provides meteorological information and other related life service information. It is also the first meteorological TV channel in China. In January 2013, the channel won an award naming it "The most valuable TV media for public welfare spreading".

== Brief introduction ==
China Weather TV is a meteorological TV channel established by China Meteorological Administration and undertaken by Huafeng Meteorological Video Information Group. It began broadcasting on May 18, 2006. Its purpose is "Prevent disasters, serve people". It provides public meteorological service and meteorological disasters preventing service.

== List of programs ==
Chinese name	Playing time	Length	References
风云进行时	Live:07:00 10:00 12:00 16:00 19:00 Replay:08:00 09:00 11:00 13:00 14:00 15:00 17:00 18:00 20:00 21:00 22:00 23:00	5 min	
天气直播间	Live:06:30 08:30 11:30 15:30 18:30 Replay:10:30 13:30 17:30 (Monday to Friday) 20:30 (Monday to Friday) 23:30	25 min	
三农新气象	Live:07:30(Saturday) Replay:07:30(Sunday to Friday)	5 min	
气象万千	Live:07:45(Monday to Friday); 09:20(Saturday and Sunday) Replay:09:20 12:30 17:20(Monday to Thursday); 09:20 12:30 17:20 21:50 22:50(Friday); 12:30 19:40 21:50 22:50(Saturday and Sunday)	5 min	
风云纪录	Live:21:30 22:30 (Saturday and Sunday) Replay:15:30 14:30 21:30 22:30(Monday to Friday)	25 min	
气象今日谈	Live:20:05(Monday, Wednesday and Friday) Replay:21:40 22:40(Monday and Wednesday); 12:10(Tuesday and Thursday) 10:40 12:10(Saturday)	15 min	
本地天气预报	From 06:56 to 23:56, every 30 minutes (On XX:26 and XX:56)	4 min	

== List of hosts ==
- Feng Shu 冯殊
- Guan Jie 关洁
- Guan Wenjun 管文君
- Jin Wei 金威
- Liu Chao 刘超
- Liu Haibo 刘海波
- Kong Deqiao 孔德俏
- Ma Wen 马雯
- Mu Wei 穆微
- Wang Lanyi 王蓝一
- Wei Dan 魏丹
- Xu Conglin 徐丛林
- Xu Peng 徐鹏
- Zhang Jianhua 张建华
- Zhang Shuai 张帅

== Awards ==
In January 2013, China Weather TV was assessed as "2012 China Media Academy Award · Annual Media Organization" and won an award named "The most valuable TV media for public welfare spreading".

In September 2014, China Weather TV 's programs 人与气候, 地球全角度 and 谈风说水 won awards named "The most promising program" and "The most influential media program". China Weather TV also won an award named "The top 10 social life channel award in China".

In March 2016, China Weather TV's programs 深海危机 and 国家气象播报——聚焦高温下儿童被锁车内事件 won "Kelei Cup" award. 深海危机 won the first award and 国家气象播报——聚焦高温下儿童被锁车内事件 won the third award.
