= Nanjing Education and Technology Channel =

- Jiangsu Province; China

Ownership
- Owner: Nanjing Broadcast Television

Links
- Website: http://www.njbg.com.cn/

Nanjing Education and Technology Channel (Chinese: 南京教育科技频道; pinyin: Nánjīng jiàoyǜ kējì píndào) is a television channel in Jiangsu Province, China, owned by Nanjing Broadcast and Television Corporation. It broadcasts numerous programs including Classic Theater (Chinese: 经典剧场) which shows many hit TV series, and other programs like Rule of Law Live and Dong Fang is Online. These programs focus on hot social issues such as environment problems, education problems, labour problems, crime problems, poverty problems and so forth.

== Current situation ==
On September 27, 2010, the channel has been given a brand-new revision, with host Dong Fa and anchorwoman Zhang Xu cooperating to host the new program - Hello Nanjing. It includes news, public opinion and supervision, and accepts content from citizen journalists. According to the reporter of the channel, the revised channel features for its authoritative programmes of law and the humanistic programmes satisfying the audiences of the emotional appeals. It is one of the most competitive brands in media service.

== Programs ==
=== Rule of Law on the Spot ===
- Every night:19:00 ~ 20:10
- Host:Fang Fang
- Rule of Law on the Spot is a news program, and it has received numerous national awards for its high-quality news and programmes. In 2003 it had the honour to win the annual China News Award. Over the years, It has kept high ratings of its time in Nanjing area. It provides the audience with fresh news and information about the law. The new program continues to play characteristic of the rule of law, and pays attention to people's livelihood. The goal of the program is to focus more on justice line, and cooperate with police, procuratorate, court, judicial administration, traffic administration more closely, to show more real-world examples and provide more legal aid.

=== Dong Fang is on line ===
- Monday to Thursday: 20:00 ~ 21:00
- Host:Dong Fang
- An emotional TV talk-show, it mainly records people's ordinary life, focusing on their joy, anger, grief, joy from a plain view and caring eye, showing the fate, emotion of figures in modern social context. The program lets every audience look for and find his (her) story, comprehending life and absorbing the essence of life and mental health. More attention is paid to social assistance and humanistic care. The program takes The Presenters Center System, it has larger efforts to reform and innovation in program production and operation mechanism.

=== Hello Nanjing ===
- Monday to Sunday: 17:50 ~ 19:00
- Host:Dong Fang
- The program includes news and public opinion and supervision. Hello Nanjing is the revision of the original program-"Live Coverage". Anchorwoman Zhang Xu cooperates with the famous host Dong Fang to host the program. The goal of the program is not to only concentrate on broadcasting the important news that happen in Nanjing everyday, but also show the opinions of internet users towards network news and events. It also includes reporters'penetrating investigation of the news fact.

=== I Want a Home ===
- Saturday to Sunday: 20:00~21:00
- In many types of marriage and dating shows, I Want a Home is consistent with real for the foundation of the program. It plays a role of a matchmaker to help guests find their true love. According to the staff, service is the purpose of the program, it also want to give publicity to the correct view on love and marriage. After the revision, the special edition consists of Love Story, Speak Your Love and Wedding Videos Collected by Zhanbo.

== Activity ==
=== Millions of Anchorwomen ===
Millions Anchorwomen is one of the important activities undertaken by Nanjing Education and Technology Channel in the year of 2011. It was a large-scale general entertainment reality show which is organized by Nanjing Radio and Television corporation and Youku network. According to the channel, it raised ordinary girls nationwide who are passionate, ambitious and longing for anchor work. The purpose of the show is to select anchor talents and realize numerous young girls' dreams.

== Main Hosts and Hostesses of the channel ==
=== Dong Fang ===
Dong Fang is a famous host of Nanjing Television Station with 12 years of working experience. He has engaged in the work of television programs since 1993. Dong Fang has a great fresh and natural hosting style. Thus he is loved by the majority of audience. He once hosted Rule of Law on the Spot, A Myriad Twinkling Lights and others. At present, he is hosting the program, Dong Fang is on Line.

- Achievements:

Nominated for "Golden Microphone" national radio and television host award.

Won the first prize of 23rd Jiangsu Province Golden Phoenix Award Hosting class.

Won the first prize of National television rule of law programs host.

=== Fang Fang ===
One of the chief hosts of Nanjing Broadcasting and Television Corporation. By the end of 1992, he was admitted to Economic Channel of Nanjing People's broadcasting Station. He founded the chat show in the evening named Midnight Heart Bridge in early 1993 and hosted the program for 12 years. In November 2004, he joined Nanjing Education and Technology Channel, and hosted Rule of Law on the Spot.

- Achievements:

Nominated for National radio and television host "Golden Microphone" Award. (2009)

Won the title of "advanced worker" of broadcast TV system in jiangsu province (enjoy treatment of municipal labor model)

=== Lu Guowei ===
She is a famous and experienced hostess of Nanjing Television Station. The hostess of the program Please Welcome Persons Involved (special edition). She has been a hostess since 1989 and has hosted different kinds of programs such as After Work, The Life of the Party, Weekend Art and others.

- Achievements:

Won the Jiangsu rule of law publicity and advanced individual (2000−2005)

== Channels of Nanjing Broadcast and Television Corporation ==
Television

Comprehensive News	Entertainment Channel	Education and Technology channel	Eighteen Channel
Film and Television Channel	Information Channel	Life Channel	Children's Channel

Radio

News Channel	Economy Channel	Sport Channel	Auto Music Channel	Urban Management Channel
My FM	Nanjing Economic Channel	Nanjing News Channel	Urban Management Channel	Traffic Channel

== Nanjing Television Station ==
Nanjing Television Station ranks top among the national capital city television stations with its comprehensive strength. Currently it has Comprehensive News, Education and Technology Channel ', the Television Channel, Live Channel, Entertainment channel, Eighteen Channel, Information Channel and Children's Channel .
