= National Bingo Night =

National Bingo Night may refer to:

- National Bingo Night (American game show), the original version of the television game show
- National Bingo Night (Australian game show), the Australian version of television the game show
- National Bingo Night (Indian game show), the version of the television game show seen in India
- Pinoy Bingo Night, the version of the television show aired in the Philippines
