= PTS XS =

- Country: Republic of China (Taiwan)
- Broadcast area: Taiwan and surrounding communities
- Network: Taiwan Public Television Service Foundation

Programming
- Language: Taiwanese Mandarin

Ownership
- Owner: Taiwan Broadcasting System

History
- Launched: August 13, 2024
- Replaced: HiHD

Links
- Website: http://ptsxs.pts.org.tw/

Availability

Terrestrial
- Digital: Channel 12

PTS XS (Hàn-jī: 小公視, lit. 'Little PTS') is a Taiwanese terrestrial children's television channel owned by Taiwan Public Television Service Foundation (PTS). It is Taiwan's first ever free-to-air terrestrial TV service dedicated for children and teens.

== History ==
The channel was conceived in 2023 as PTS's operating budget increased threefold for fiscal 2024.

The Public Television Service announced on April 25, 2024 that it would launch its children's channel, PTS XS, effective August 13, starting with a week of test broadcasts, then, from August 20, a full service. It was set to replace PTS Channel 3's bandwidth on the digital terrestrial platform. The goal of the channel was to increase the rate of children's television production in Taiwan, which, up until then, lacked resources. The channel planned to carry 639 monthly hours of children's programs, twice as much as the main channel. Upon launch, it received praise from local politicians, as Taiwanese were used to watch cartoons from abroad for decades.

On June 30, 2025, PTS XS launched its international co-development program, to create preschool IPs with foreign partners. Its first international co-production, Arty Mice, was announced earlier in June, with France Télévisions, Caribara and D18 Paris.

== Identity ==
The channel's visual identity, designed by Bito, is based on the idea of a pocket, inhabited by five characters. The English name PTS XS represents the target audience (XS to XL, meaning kids to adults). The XS part of the name is included in the pocket icon of the channel's logo. The pocket aesthetic also lent its name to the PTS XS Pocket Film Festival, first held on December 28, 2024.
