= Nanjing Radio =

China
- Broadcast area: Nanjing, China
- Frequencies: Internet, AM, and FM

Programming
- Format: various

Ownership
- Owner: Nanjing Broadcasting System (南京广播电视台)

History
- First air date: May 18, 1949 (Start broadcasting for the first time)

Links
- Website: http://www.njbs.com.cn/

Nanjing Radio
- Traditional Chinese: 南京人民廣播電台/江南廣播網
- Simplified Chinese: 南京人民广播电台/江南广播网
Transcriptions
Standard Mandarin
- Hanyu Pinyin: Nánjīng Rénmín Guǎngbō Diàntái/Jiāngnán Guǎngbō Wǎng
Yue: Cantonese
- Jyutping: Gong^{1}naam^{4} Gwong^{2}bo^{3} Mong^{5}

Nanjing Radio (Group), (Chinese: 南京人民广播电台，江南广播网; pinyin: Nánjīng Rénmín Guǎngbō Diàntái, Jiāngnán Guǎngbō Wǎng; lit. 'Nanjing People's Radio Broadcasting Station', 'South Yangtze River Radio Broadcasting Network') is a family of radio stations that serve the Nanjing China area. It is also associated with the Nanjing Broadcasting System.

== List of Nanjing radio stations ==
- Nanjing News (Xinwen) Radio (NJXWT) 105.9FM And 1008AM
- Nanjing Economic Radio (NJJJT1) 98.1FM And 900AM
- Nanjing Sports Radio (NJJJT2)
- Nanjing Music (Yin Yue) Radio (NJYYT) 105.8FM
- Nanjing Traffic (Jiao Tong) Radio (NJJTT) : 102.4FM
- Nanjing Urban Management Radio (NJCSGLT) 96.6FM And 1143AM
