= Beautiful Life Television =

- Headquarters: Taiwan

Ownership
- Owner: Fo Guang Shan

History
- Launched: 1997
- Former names: Buddha's Light Television

Links
- Website: www.bltv.tv (in Chinese)

Beautiful Life Television
- Traditional Chinese: 人間衛視
- Simplified Chinese: 人间卫视
- Literal meaning: Mortal World Satellite Television
Transcriptions
Standard Mandarin
- Hanyu Pinyin: Rénjiān Wèishì

Beautiful Life Television (BLTV), known as Buddha's Light Television from 1997 to 2002, is a non-profit, faith-based television station in Taiwan owned by the Fo Guang Shan Dharma TV Foundation and founded by the Buddhist master Hsing Yun in 1997. It is one of several Buddhist-based TV channels in Taiwan, the others being Da Ai Television, Hwazan Television, Buddha Compassion Television, Life Television and Universal Culture Television.
