= Health & Lifestyle Channel =

Internet channel

Health & Lifestyle Channel (HLC) is the world's first 24/7 TV/internet channel where all the contents solely focus on health and lifestyle.

== Programming ==
HLC was created by Robert Chua as a cross-media interactive TV with television, internet and telephony merging to enhance TV viewers and internet users' viewing facility. All its live shows are simulcast over i-Cable Channel 27 and throughout the world on www.hlctv.net, and introduce both Eastern and Western Health Care and promote the benefits of Traditional Chinese Medicine (TCM) to the world. HCL purports to promote a healthy lifestyle with preventive care promotions, aids prevention, blood donation, hygiene, etiquette etc., as a guide to a quality lifestyle.
