= Best News Entertainment =

New Zealand Asian media company

Coordinates: 36.892°S 174.833°E

- Country: New Zealand
- Broadcast area: Major centres on Freeview terrestrial
- Headquarters: Penrose, Auckland, New Zealand

Programming
- Languages: Standard Chinese; Taiwanese Mandarin; Cantonese; Japanese; Korean; English
- Picture format: 576i (SDTV) 16:9

History
- Launched: 1 June 2000 (Sky TV channels); 13 August 2007 (UHF) 9 October 2008 (Freeview)

Links
- Website: bne.co.nz

Best News Entertainment (abbreviated as BNE) is a New Zealand radio and print media company specialising in media for Asian migrants and Asian language communities. It operates three 24-hour radio networks through terrestrial radio. It previously operated TV32, a free-to-air television channel on the Freeview platform.

The radio stations, AM936, Chinese Radio FM 99.4 and Chinese Radio FM 104.2, broadcast a combination of Hong Kong and Chinese programmes, and local music, parenting and talkback shows.

The company was known as World TV from its formation in 2000 until 2021, when it was acquired by new owners.

In December 2005, the company claimed to have 11,500 subscribers across the country for its seven channels of Chinese, Taiwanese and Hong Kong programmes. In 2009, the company claimed 20,000 people received its World TV subscriber magazine. World TV's largest shareholder is Taiwanese resident Fun-nu Tsai with a 19 percent stake; chief executive Henry Ho owns 15 percent of the company and 11 other investors also have shares. The company's income is now evenly shared between advertising and subscription fees.

== History ==
=== 2000-2004 ===
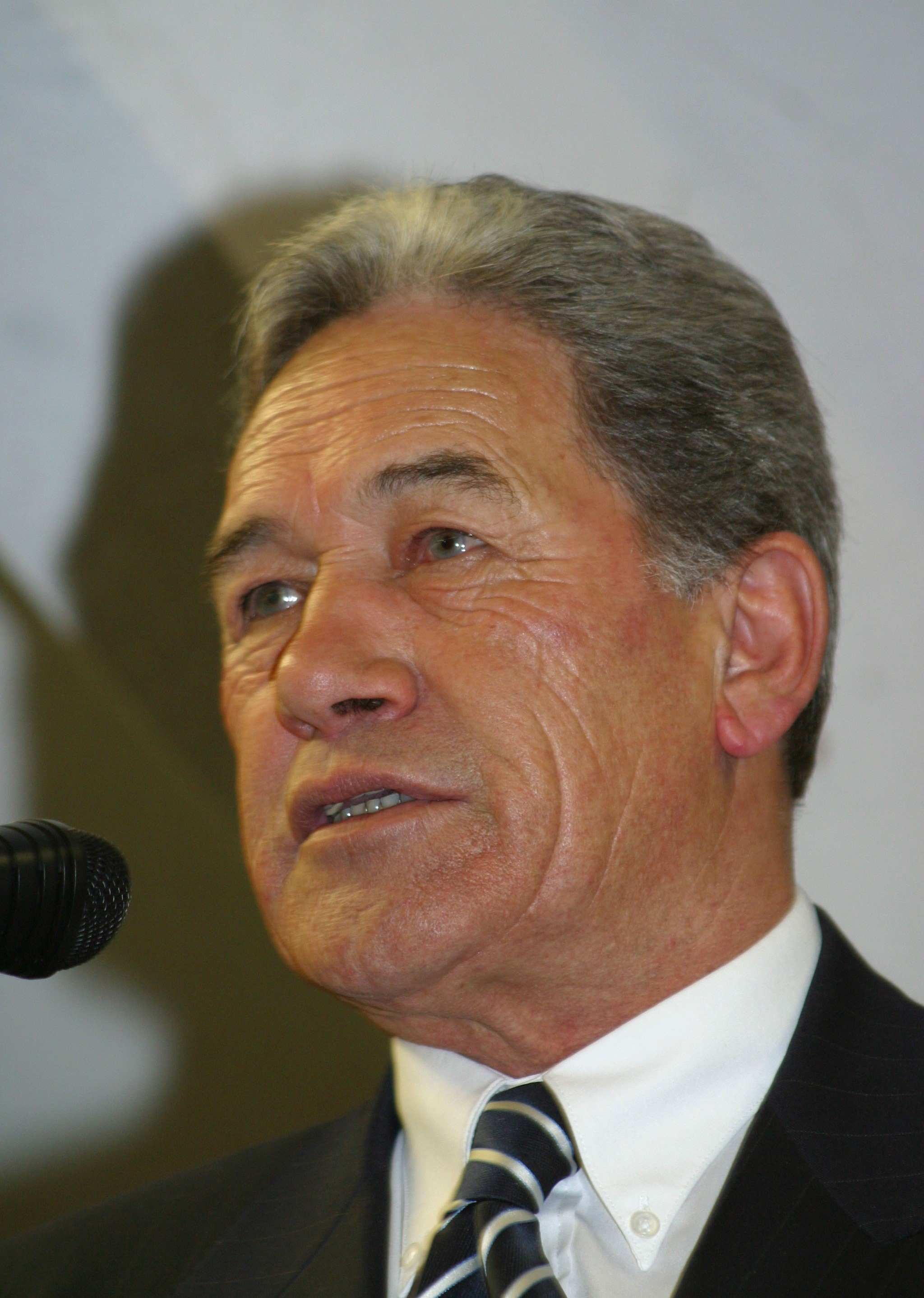
Winston Peters was interviewed by World TV in 2002.

World TV launched in June 2000 to take advantage of the infrastructure and viewing quality of the Sky TV digital platform that had been launched the year before. Through its ongoing partnership with Sky, it has continued to provide entertainment, educational and cultural programming to new migrants, New Zealand-born Chinese New Zealanders and other speakers and learners of standard Mandarin throughout the country. The company's mission has been to help new generations of Asian New Zealanders retain their language and cultural identity through quality programming, up-to-date information, imported entertainment and local community news.

World TV attracted the attention of other media in 2002, for an interview by Rod Peng on the Face to Face programme with New Zealand First leader Winston Peters. Peters claimed most migrants from the past 30 years would agree the volume of new migrants coming into the country could be a cause of "discord, violence and racism". Peters also used the appearance to accuse other media of misrepresenting him as anti-Asian, because of what he called an unprofessional focus on emotions rather than facts. He argued he was instead an advocate for new migrants being settled, employed and integrated in small numbers. Peng described Peters as a "very capable politician" with a "very big communication problem".

Between November 2003 and December 2004, Touch China TV also made an attempt to target Chinese-speaking audiences with a two-hour afternoon slot on music channel C4. A University of Otago study put the station's closure down to its failure to combine local content and Chinese programming in a way that gave it a point of difference to transnational broadcasters geared at new English-as-second-language migrants.

=== 2004– ===
The company expanded into radio, setting up Auckland-based radio stations Real Good Life (now Chinese Radio FM 99.4) in 2004, New Supremo (now AM936) in 2004, and Radio 9 (now Chinese Radio FM 104.2) in 2010. In 2004, it set up wholly owned subsidiary Chinese Voice Broadcasting to operate the stations on a day-to-day basis. In 2006, World TV added three channels to serve Korean and Japanese language communities. In August 2007, CTV8, the first 24-hour free-to-air Chinese television channel, joined the service - initially as an analogue channel and later as part of the Freeview line-up.

English-language television channel TV9 began broadcasting on Freeview in February 2012, combining imported programmes with simulcasts of Chinese Radio shows. Chief executive Henry Ho said the introduction of specialist English-language broadcasting was a reflection of growing demand for information about Asia, strengthening trading and cultural ties between Asia and New Zealand, and New Zealanders becoming increasingly interested in Asia.

The Chinese media market is very competitive, despite the closure of several Asian media outlets. Asia Downunder, the country's only programme specifically targeted towards Asian communities, broadcast on TV One between 1994 and 2008. Limited Chinese programming aired on local Auckland channel Triangle TV in the early 2000s through commercial operation Golden Raindrop TV.

In late 2015, World TV removed all Taiwanese programming from its channels. On 19 January 2016 Sky announced the World TV channels 300-309 will cease transmission from 1 March 2016.

== Free-to-air television ==
Best News Entertainment operates a New Zealand free-to-air television channel, transmitted by Kordia via DVB 64-QAM.

=== TV32 ===
Former CTV8 logo.

Former TV28 logo.

TV32, formerly known as CTV8 (CTV 八; pinyin bā), WTV28 and TV28 is a free-to-air regional television channel in Auckland, New Zealand. It launched in August 2007 on UHF Channel 62 and broadcast 24 hours a day to the Auckland urban region. TV32 has made history in New Zealand as the first Chinese national television channel to be launched. The channel was later made available nationwide via Freeview terrestrial originally on Freeview Channel 28, with the UHF signal switched off during 2012 and 2013. The station is predominantly in Mandarin with some Cantonese and limited English content. It also simulcasts New Supremo radio programmes.

The channel is targeted at the rapidly growing Chinese population in the Auckland urban region (approx. 105,000 Chinese) and for people who are interested in Mandarin. The Schedule includes a variety of Infotainment news, dramas, lifestyle talkshows and much more. News is broadcast direct-live from Phoenix News. Most programs are made in The Greater China Region of China, Hong Kong, Taiwan and Macau.

TV32 also broadcasts its daily morning programme (I Love New Zealand) at 7 am and its afternoon programme (News Talk for Today) at 3 pm. Its radio talk shows are free-to-watch on TVNZ ondemand for New Zealand residents. The channel also covers local Chinese community events, and provided delayed coverage of the Chinese New Year of the Dragon ceremony in 2012. It has also offered airtime to Korean-owned shopping channel YESSHOP.

In April 2024, the channel was rebranded as TV32, coinciding with the move to Freeview Channel 32 from Channel 28.

=== Defunct ===
==== TV29 ====
TV29 previously broadcast on Freeview channel 29.

Former TV9 logo.

TV29, also known as Panda Channel 29, was a free mainstream English-language channel with a focus on Asian programming, broadcasting on Freeview 29 to take advantage of Freeview's larger capacity compared to conventional UHF broadcasting and the growing uptake of the platform. It targeted local Chinese communities and those interested in Chinese culture. The channel was available in Auckland, Tauranga, Waikato, Napier, Hastings, Palmerston North, New Plymouth, Wellington, Canterbury and Dunedin. It launched on 21 January 2012 Auckland's ASB Lunarfest and began broadcasting on 1 February that year as TV9.

The station broadcast drama, news and current affairs from Hong Kong, Taiwan and mainland China, alongside a range of variety shows, world documentaries and infotainment programmes. Movies and dramas were broadcast with English subtitles, alongside international news, finance, politics and trade programmes from CCTV including Asia Today, Biz Asia, Dialogue and China 24. The station also broadcast local programmes, including the Asia Focus talk show and TV29 News bulletins, hosted by station manager Julian Nixon.

TV29 stopped broadcasting on 1 October 2021.

== Radio ==
Chinese Voice (Chinese: 華人之聲廣播電臺) is a Cantonese, Mandarin and English language radio network, and wholly owned subsidiary of World TV It consists of three station set up between 2003 and 2010, which broadcast on terrestrial radio frequencies, on Sky TV and online. It produces more than 80 hours of local content for the stations each week, including live talkback on news stories, migrant issues, political developments and dealing with New Zealand Government agencies. The rest of the schedules are made up of imported talk and music programmes from China and Hong Kong.

Chinese Radio FM 99.4 (Chinese: FM99.4中文電台), Auckland's only Cantonese language radio station, focuses on news and programmes from Hong Kong, but is also geared towards Cantonese-speaking communities from Canton, Singapore and Malaysia as well. AM936, New Zealand's only Mandarin-language radio station, aims to appeal to New Zealanders of Chinese heritage regardless of their age, class, gender, employment status occupation or interests. Chinese Radio FM 104.2, an English language and Chinese language radio station, broadcasts news with a Chinese worldview, information about modern China and documentaries about the modern world.

== Other services ==
=== Festivals ===
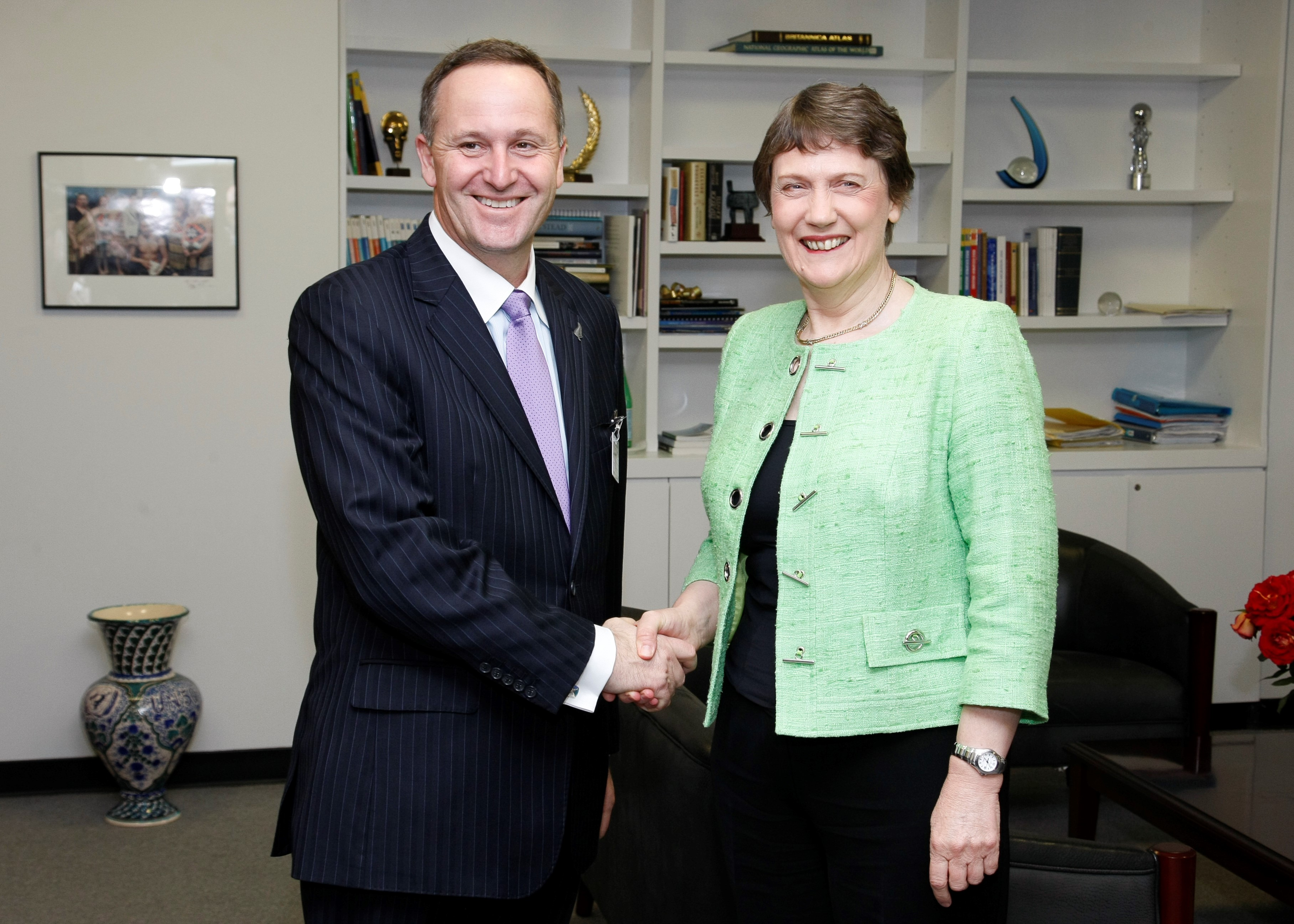
Prime minister John Key (left) has attended events sponsored by World TV.

World TV sponsors several major events in Auckland for the local Chinese and Asian community, which are often a focal point for political campaigning. During the 2011 election campaign, prime minister John Key, Melissa Lee and other National Party MPs campaigned at the World Spring Festival, alongside Labour Party candidates David Cunliffe, Phil Goff, Raymond Huo and Susan Zhu. Key used the opportunity to praise the Chinese community for its contribution to the economy, while Cunliffe reminded the audience that the New Zealand–China Free Trade Agreement had been signed under Labour's watch.

The Year of the Dragon ASB Lunarfest in 2012 also had World TV sponsorship. The flower market festival of culture, magic, pop music and fireworks was televised on World TV networks, and was the official launch event of TV9.

=== Website and social media ===
World TV's Chinese language iStars portal was set up in 2011. It includes news, classified advertising, games, health and games in both traditional and simplified Chinese. It also features games, on-demand video and live streams from the company's TV and radio stations, and an online forum for New Zealand's Chinese community. The site pays particular attention to news from Auckland, and has featured exclusive interviews with mayor Len Brown.

The official multilingual World TV website was set up in 2001, and was redesigned the site in 2005, 2007, 2009, 2014 and 2015. World TV has also produced a mobile app, and is active on Weibo, WeChat and Facebook.

== Discontinued pay television channels ==
World TV previously operated ten channels through a subscription-only service on Sky TV. These channels were discontinued in March 2016

=== Korean ===
World TV's Sky subscription package included ten television channels.

Two Korean channels had broadcast from August 2007 to March 2016. KTV1 (Sky 300) relayed popular KBS World Korean language entertainment, news, sport, culture, music, documentary, drama and children's programmes and finance reports. 3 News also broadcast with Korean subtitles on weekday evenings. KTV2 (Sky 301) broadcast a mix of popular MBC and SBS Korean language television channels. MBC supplied news, sport, culture, music, documentary, drama, children's programming and finance reports, while SBS supplied well-known dramas.

With a steady increase in Korean migrants since 1998, Korean is the third most widely spoken Asian language in New Zealand. World TV's Korean channels connected the close-knit Korean language community, alongside radio stations, schools and churches.

=== Japanese ===
World TV had offered one Japanese channel from August 2007 to March 2016. JTV (Sky 302) featured news, sport, culture, documentary, drama, music, finance report and children's programmes from NHK World Premium. It also provided an NHK world radio 24-hour service through the sub-audio system.

=== Chinese and Taiwanese ===
Seven Chinese and Taiwanese channels had been included on World TV's Sky TV line-up from 2000 to March 2016.

CTV1 (Sky 303) included Cantonese entertainment and information, finance and business reports from TVBJ, ATV, RTHK and I-Cable TV. There were also movies from Celestial Movies and broadcasts of 3 News with Chinese subtitles every evening.

CTV2 (Sky 304) was a variety show channel in standard Mandarin with programmes from ETTV, Chung T'ien Television, Jet TV, TVBSN, TVBS, Azio TV, Unique Business TV, CTV Television Network, STV of Taiwan and local productions such as local news programme.

CTV3 (Sky 305) was a Taiwan-based channel in standard Mandarin. This channel brought together prime-time dramas and variety shows from FTV, SETI, ETTV, CTI, Da-Ai TV, TVB 8, and STV.

CTV4 (Sky 306) was a standard Mandarin channel of daily news, business and finance reports, sport, culture, documentary, variety shows and dramas sourced from the Phoenix TV Chinese Channel of Hong Kong.

CTV5 (307) was a Chinese drama channel in Mandarin. This channel screened the latest dramas from Monday to Friday with classical movies and dramas for Saturday and Sunday. Dramas come from the TVB Xing He channel in Hong Kong, and individual producers from Shanghai and Beijing.

CTV6 (Sky 308) was a standard Mandarin channel mainly broadcasting the state-owned CCTV-4 of China.

CTV7 (Sky 309) was a standard Mandarin channel formed by Hunan Broadcasting System and Phoenix TV Info News Channel.
