= Chinese Voice =

Chinese-language radio network in New Zealand

Chinese Voice 華人之聲廣播電臺
- Auckland; New Zealand
- Frequencies: 99.4 FM, 936 AM, 104.2 FM

Programming
- Format: Full service

Ownership
- Owner: Best News Entertainment

History
- First air date: 2003

Technical information
- Transmitter coordinates: 36.906°S 174.822°E

Links
- Website: www.nz936.com

Chinese Voice (Chinese: 華人之聲廣播電臺) is a Cantonese, Mandarin and English language radio network based in Auckland, New Zealand. It is a wholly owned subsidiary of Best News Entertainment, an Asian language television, print and radio company, and consists of three station set up between 2003 and 2010. It produces more than 80 hours of local content each week, including live talkback on news stories, migrant issues, political developments and dealing with New Zealand Government agencies. The stations also broadcast imported talk and music programmes from China and Hong Kong.

Chinese Radio FM 99.4 Chinese: FM99.4中文電台, Auckland's only Cantonese language radio station, focuses on news and programmes from Hong Kong, but is also geared towards Cantonese-speaking communities from Canton, Singapore and Malaysia as well. AM936, New Zealand's only Mandarin-language radio station, aims to appeal to New Zealanders of Chinese heritage regardless of their age, class, gender, employment status occupation or interests. Chinese Radio FM 104.2, an English language and Chinese language radio station, broadcasts news with a Chinese worldview, information about modern China and documentaries about the modern world.

The network broadcasts worldwide online and in Auckland on terrestrial radio frequencies. It previously broadcast nationwide on Sky TV. It claims to reach 150,000 New Zealanders of a Chinese origin. It has accepted a role in broadcasting public messages to Cantonese and Mandarin speaking communities during Civil Defence emergencies. The Ministry of Civil Defence & Emergency Management runs Chinese language advertisements on the network, reminding people to be prepared for natural disasters and other emergency situations. This is part of the Get Ready Get Thru programme, which aims to reach the widest possible reach of people living in New Zealand.

== History ==
=== 2003-2010 ===
Chinese Voice's original parent company, World TV, was set up in June 2000 to take advantage of the infrastructure and viewing quality of the recently launched Sky TV digital platform, and reach the country's growing Asian population. The proportion of New Zealanders of Asian origin doubled between 1991 and 2001, with the fastest increase being in Auckland's Chinese population. More than 80,000 New Zealanders speak Chinese and at least one other language, including almost 36,000 who speak Yue dialects like Cantonese. Almost 32,000 New Zealanders can only speak Chinese, including 10,000 who can only speak Yue dialects like Cantonese. Many are multilingual.

The company set up Chinese Voice stations over several years as it acquired new terrestrial radio frequencies in Auckland. Cantonese language radio station Chinese Radio FM 99.4 Chinese: FM99.4中文電台 was launched as Real Good Life in 2003, and Standard Chinese station AM936 was launched as New Supremo in 2004. Chinese Voice Broadcasting was set up to run both stations. Chinese Radio FM 104.2, an English language and Chinese language radio station, began as Radio 9 in 2010 . It is a joint venture between World TV and Chinese state-owned international broadcaster China Radio International, but operates as part of the Chinese Voice network.

=== 2010-2014 ===
Bevan Chuang, an Auckland Chinese community leader born in Hong Kong, was a Chinese Radio FM 104.2 host between 2011 and 2013. During the 2013 local elections she interviewed candidates for Auckland Council positions, like Orakei ward councilor Cameron Brewer, on her radio programme. At the same time she was serving as chairwoman of the Asian Women and Family Trust, was a member of the council's Ethnic Peoples Advisory Panel, and was standing for the Albert-Eden Local Board.

After the election, it emerged she was also in a sexual relationship with Auckland mayor Len Brown, in what was described as "the biggest sex scandal in New Zealand public life". Brown had been reelected for a second term as mayor, while she had failed to win election to the local board. Chuang revealed to blogger Cameron Slater she had been a mistress to the mayor, who was married and had children. This had followed her public appeal for a sperm donor, in an effort to conceive a child during the Year of the Dragon.

=== 2014- ===
In 2014 the Broadcasting Standards Authority rejected a privacy complaint against Chinese Radio FM 99.4, over the NZ Life talkback programme. The complainant told the radio station about her young daughter's experience of having her tooth extracted. The woman said the dentist would not allow her to be in the operating room with her daughter, did not wear a mask, pinched her daughter, and told her to swallow blood after the tooth extraction. She also asked the station not to identify her or her daughter. During one show, the hosts relayed the complainant's account and described the dentist's conduct as inappropriate. During another show, one host said he had visited the dentist, described a recording he had seen of the consultation and operation, and said he no longer believed the dentist had acted inappropriately.

The complainant argued the disclosure of treatment details was a breach of privacy. She further argued the host had misled the audience by providing untrue information about her daughter's experience. She believed Chinese Radio FM 99.4 had been inaccurate and unfair in its coverage of the story, had breached responsible programming standards, and had excluded her viewpoint on a controversial issue. The authority found there had been no breach of privacy as the woman and her daughter were never personally identified, and the complainant had failed to raise these other issues with the broadcaster. It found the dentist's disclosure of treatment information to the radio host was better dealt with by other agencies.

== Stations ==
=== Love FM 99.4 ===
Love FM 99.4 logo

Love FM 99.4 (Chinese: FM99.4中文電台) focuses on news and programmes from Hong Kong, and targets Cantonese-speaking listeners from Hong Kong, Singapore, Malaysia, southern China and southeast Asian. It began as Real Good Life in 2003, broadcasting on 95.8 FM. When The Radio Network bought the frequency for Flava in 2009, the station moved to 99.4 FM. In 2014, it became Chinese Radio FM 99.4. The station targets a broad range of demographics, with programming slots dedicated to young adults, homemakers, workers, professionals and retired people. It has covered several major New Zealand news events and elections, with news bulletins and news programmes throughout the year.

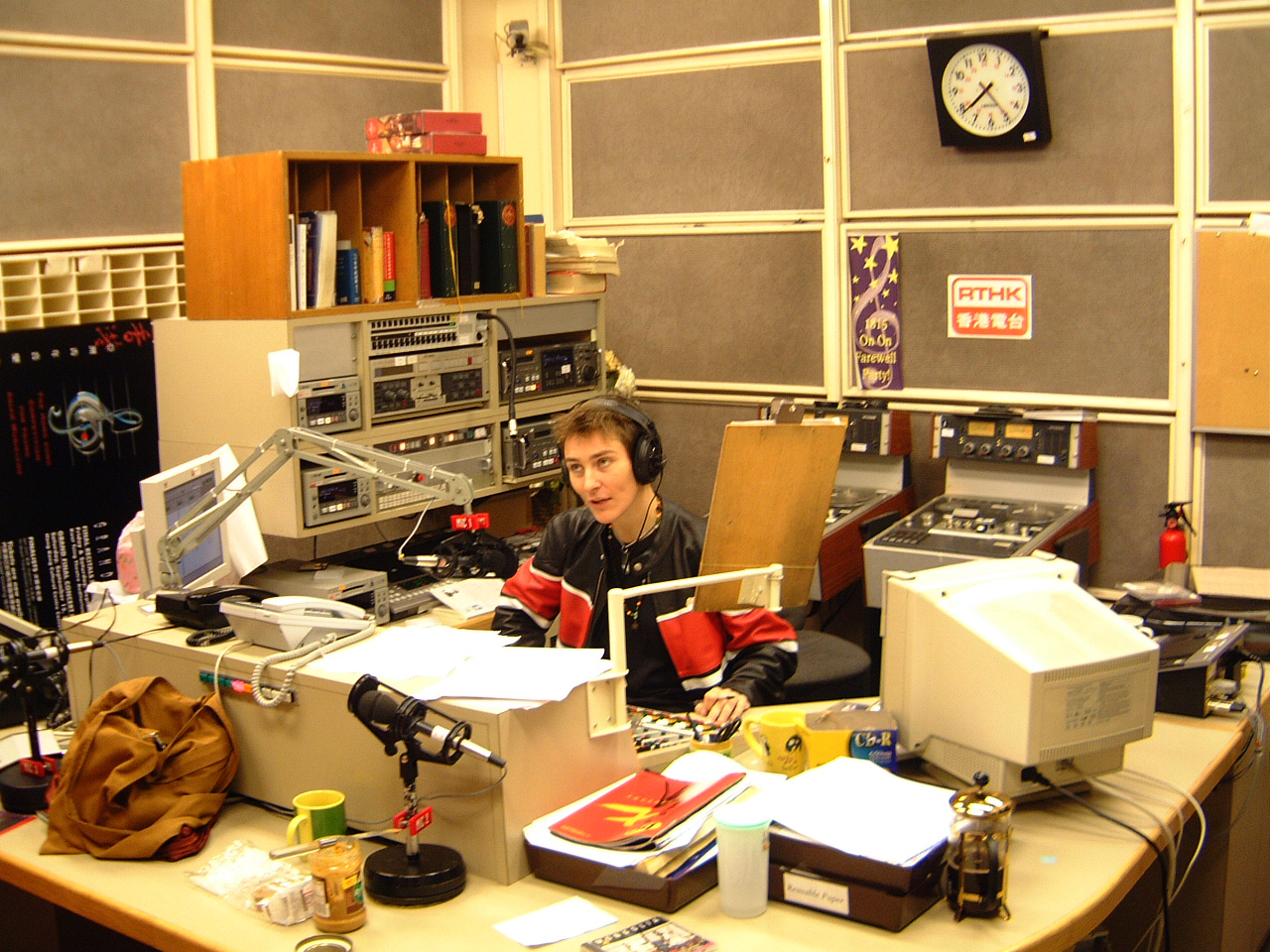
RTHK programmes are broadcast on Chinese Radio FM 99.4 every week.

Chinese Radio FM 99.4's programming includes public affairs and news programmes, talk shows, documentaries, music, and shows targeting young people, parents and homemakers. There are hourly news updates focusing on Chinese affairs, and air time dedicated to current affairs coverage and local public service information. Breakfast show "Hello New Zealand" airs from 7am and afternoon drive time programme "News & Lifestyle" airs from 3pm. Other regular shows include Let’s Talk About News, NZ Life and A Different View. Hosts include Bryan Chan, Michael, Queenie Chan, Yvonne Chan, John and Benny.

Commercial Radio Hong Kong (Chinese: 香港商業電台) supplies Chinese Radio FM 99.4 with a range of entertainment, information, education, arts and culture programmes. It is also the source of regular current affairs bulletins. Most other Commercial Radio Hong Kong programmes are re-broadcast by Chinese Radio FM 99.4, including popular radio serial 17/F Block C, the morning chat show Storm in a tea cup, talk show Saying East to West, and the pillow talk show Heartbreak Valley. Commercial Radio Hong Kong's weekly pop chart, Ultimate Chart Show, is a cornerstone of Chinese Radio FM 99.4's line-up.

Other programmes are sourced from Hong Kong's only other commercial radio broadcaster, Metro Broadcast Corporation (Chinese: 新城廣播有限公司). These include shows from across Metro's six radio channels: Metro Finance, Metro Info, Metro Plus, Metro Finance Digital, Metro Music Digital and Metro Life Digital. Chinese Radio FM 99.4 also relays public radio programmes from Radio Television Hong Kong (RTHK; Chinese: 香港電台), the public broadcaster of Hong Kong. RTHK is an independent government department under the Communications Authority, with a strong reputation for editorial independence. Its programmes, from seven radio stations, cover education, entertainment and public current affairs.

=== AM936 ===
AM936 logo

AM936 (Chinese: 中文版, also known as New Supremo) is New Zealand's only Mandarin-language radio station and claims to be New Zealand's most influential Chinese radio station. The station targets New Zealanders of Chinese origin, with specific programming blocks for different ages, employment statuses, occupations and interests More than 80,000 New Zealanders speak Chinese and at least one other language, including almost 45,000 who speak northern dialects like Mandarin. Almost 32,000 New Zealanders can only speak Chinese, including 10,000 who can only speak northern dialects like Mandarin. Many Chinese New Zealanders are also multilingual. AM936 was established in February 2004. It was set up to combine imported talk and music programming from China with locally produced language programming, including live talkback on news stories, migrant issues, political developments and dealing with New Zealand Government agencies.

Local Auckland breakfast show I Love New Zealand airs from 7am, drive show Newstalk Today airs from 3pm, and both simulcast on Freeview channel TV28. The station claims these shows provide "timely report the up-to-date information" about local Auckland issues, including local news interviews and news bulletins. By simulcasting the shows across radio and TV, the station says "viewers and listeners interact and voice their opinions on the same platform" and "the mainstream Kiwi can get to know more about the Chinese community and the Chinese culture here". The simulcast talk format has now been emulated by MediaWorks New Zealand, which simulcasts the Paul Henry Show on TV3 and Radio Live at breakfast time.

The station broadcasts more than 70 hours of local content every week. Other programmes cover topics like news, current affairs, finance, economics, culture, immigration, education and music. Its hosts include Susan, Muzi, Marilyn, Tian Tian, Shen Xu, Ya Bing, Christine, Pu Zheng, Zi Fei, Liang Yuan, Jing Fang, Yi Yi and Cath. Many of its local programmes are simulcast or rebroadcast in Auckland on Chinese Radio FM 104.2. The station also sources many programmes from overseas providers. These include popular Beijing radio programmes from Radio Beijing Corporation, influential news programmes from China National Radio, and well-known Taiwanese radio programmes from UFO Taiwan. AN936 includes regular news updates and current affairs interviews during its breakfast and drivetime programmes, in Mandarin or English. The station also broadcasts community notices, event listings and public service messages.

=== Chinese Radio FM 104.2 ===
This is the logo of Chinese Radio FM 104.2.

Chinese Radio FM 104.2 (Chinese: FM104.2中文電台, also known as Radio 9) is an English-language and Chinese-language radio station, broadcasting in Auckland, New Zealand on 104.2. It previously broadcast on Sky TV channel 313. Chinese Radio FM 102.2 was launched on 5 March 2010 (Chinese: 華人之聲廣播電臺). It is a joint venture between Chinese Voice and China Radio International (Chinese: 中国国际广播电台; pinyin: Zhōngguó Guójì Guǎngbō Diàntái), the People's Republic of China (PRC) state-owned international radio broadcaster, the station broadcasts programmes from China Radio International. These programmes follow the Chinese Communist Party's stance on political issues such as the Political status of Taiwan and the status of the Dalai Lama.

The station says it aims to increase New Zealanders' understanding of China and Chinese New Zealanders' attachment to their homeland. Its content is predominantly focused on news with a Chinese worldview, information about modern China, and documentaries about the modern world. Some local programmes were also simulcast on World TV's free-to-air television station TV9. Hosts include Shawn Zhang, Simon Zhu, Manning Chen, YiYi Ma, Nick Jie, Mu Tong, Darryl Gao, Brianna Bo, Claire Dai and Jianming Guo.
