= ArrowLine Chinese Radio =

Radio station in Johannesburg, South Africa

ArrowLine Chinese Radio, AM 1269 (Chinese name: 南非華夏之聲廣播電台), was a Chinese radio station based in Johannesburg, South Africa since 2011. Following the closure of Overseas Chinese Radio, it became the only Chinese language radio station in South Africa. The station broadcast much of its content from China Radio International, the state-owned broadcaster in the People's Republic of China.
