= Shanghai Media & Entertainment Group =

Chinese media conglomerate

- Industry: Media; Broadcast; Hospitality; Entertainment
- Founded: April 19, 1997; 29 years ago
- Headquarters: China
- Subsidiaries: Shanghai Media Group; Shanghai Film Group; Shanghai Oriental Pearl (Group); SMEG Performing Arts Center; SMEG Special Events Office; SME Industry Co.; SME Technology Development Co.; STR International Holdings Co.; Shanghai Film Archives
- Website: smeg.com.cn

Shanghai Media & Entertainment Group (SMEG) is one of the largest media conglomerates in China. Founded on April 19, 1997, SMEG is a major media content provider in China that also manages other culture-related businesses such as performances, exhibitions, tourism and hotels.

== Organization ==
The company comprises nine subsidiaries:

- Shanghai Media Group (TV and radio stations in Shanghai)
- Shanghai Film Group (film, animation, documentary productions in Shanghai)
- Shanghai Oriental Pearl (Group) Co., Ltd.
- SMEG Performing Arts Center
- SMEG Special Events Office
- SME Industry Co., Ltd.
- SME Technology Development Co., Ltd.
- STR International Holdings Co., Ltd.
- Shanghai Film Archives
