= CTV Classic =

- Country: Republic of China (Taiwan)
- Broadcast area: Taiwan
- Network: China Television

History
- Launched: 1 June 2004
- Former names: CTV Life; CTV MyLife

CTV Classic (Chinese: 中視經典台), formerly known as CTV MyLife (Chinese: 中視綜藝台), is a digital television channel operated by China Television (CTV) in Taiwan.

== See also ==
- Media of Taiwan
