= Nanjing Broadcasting Network =

Television network in Nanjing, China

Nanjing Broadcasting Network (NBN) 南京广电网络
- Logo of Nanjing Broadcasting Network
- Type: Broadcast
- Country: People's Republic of China
- Official website: NBN Online

Nanjing Broadcasting Network (Chinese: 南京广电网络; pinyin: Nánjīng Guǎngdiàn Wǎngluò) is a cable TV and telecommunications (5G Mobile telecommunications and Broadband) provider in the Nanjing, China area.
