= CTS Education and Culture =

CTS Education, Sports and Culture
- Country: Republic of China (Taiwan)
- Broadcast area: Republic of China
- Network: Chinese Television System

Programming
- Picture format: 1080i HDTV

Ownership
- Owner: Taiwan Broadcasting System

History
- Launched: September 1, 1983
- Former names: CTS Education and Culture (January 1, 1983 - December 15, 2017)

Availability

Terrestrial
- Digital: Channel 13

CTS Education, Sports and Culture (Chinese: 華視教育體育文化台) is a free-to-air television station in Taiwan, operated by Chinese Television System (CTS). The channel mainly broadcasts documentaries, arts and cultural programming, archival programming from the CTS library, and live sports coverage.

== History ==
When CTS was established, it was only allocated one VHF channel. In addition to producing and broadcasting news, entertainment, public welfare and other programs, it also produced and broadcast teaching programs such as the University of the Air, business education, on-the-job training for teachers, and university electives. Since 1977, in conjunction with the establishment of the Aviation Business College (Air Business College) and the Air Administration College (Air Business College), CTS has successively produced and broadcast Air Business College and Air Business College courses. In 1983, the Executive Yuan approved the allocation of a UHF channel (channel numbers 33 to 36) to Chinese Television System for the exclusive production and broadcast of teaching programs. The UHF channel was launched at 17:00 on September 1, 1983, making China Television the third largest channel at the time. The only TV station with dual channels and an independent department to produce and broadcast teaching programs; this UHF channel is generally called "CTS UHF Teaching Channel" (華視超高頻教學頻道). When the broadcast starts every day, the national anthem of the Republic of China (Executive Yuan version) will be played.

On June 14, 2003, in response to the needs of self-study students who were quarantined at home due to the SARS incident, the Ministry of Education of the Republic of China commissioned Chinese Television Systen to launch the "CTS Teaching Platform". After Taiwan’s digital terrestrial television platform started broadcasting in 2004, Chinese Television System Teaching Station was included in the China Television DTT channel group. In 2005, China Television Education Channel was renamed as "Chinese Television Systen IQ Education and Culture Channel"; after China Television became "public" (joined the Taiwan Public Radio and Television Group) in 2006, China Television IQ Education and Culture Channel was renamed as "China Television Education and Culture Channel". "China Daily" once published the program list of China Television Education and Culture Channel, calling this channel "UHF" (it has now been published on the official website of China Daily).

According to the "One-year China Television Publicization Report" published by Chinese Television System in 2007, within the first year of Chinese Television System's publicization, the proportion of self-produced and commissioned programs of CTS Education and Culture Channel is as follows: the proportion of self-produced programs is 45.4% (CTS Teaching Division produces 45.1 hours per week, and other CTS departments produce 28 hours, totaling 73.1 hours per week). The proportion of commissioned programs is 19.8% (National Institute of Airborne Continuing Education entrusts China Television Teaching Division to produce, both parties share the copyright, a total of 31.5 hours per week), the proportion of programs produced and broadcast in cooperation with CTS's external units is 26% (including the "Art Live" series and the "3e Learning Home" series, a total of 42 hours per week), external units The proportion of commissioned programs is 8.8% (14 hours per week, including "Happy Seniors", "Working Hard - The History of the Taiwanese People", "Let Life Shine", "Technology Taiwan's New National Power", "We Are One Family").

On January 1, 2015, CTS Education and Culture Channel was fixed on digital cable TV channel 110 (Penghu Cable TV is channel 95).

On January 20, 2015, some digital cable TV system operators switched to high-definition broadcasting of CTS Education and Culture Channel.

In July 2015, Chinese Television System cooperated with the Taiwan Vietnamese New Residents Association. Starting from August 3 of the same year, CTS selected 6 to 7 reports in "CTS Lunchtime News" every day. Chien Chi Wing, the husband of the famous Vietnamese teacher Chen Huangfeng, convened Southeast Asian students Immediate translation and dubbing, China Television Education and Culture Channel broadcasts news in Vietnamese, Indonesian and Thai for ten minutes each at 19:00, 20:00 and 21:00 every Monday to Friday. This is the first time in the history of Taiwan terrestrial television to broadcast news in Southeast Asian languages.

On October 1, 2015, CTS Education and Culture Channel officially changed its name to "CTS Education and Culture Channel".

On January 18, 2017, the 732nd committee meeting of the National Communications Commission (NCC) approved the operation plan of China Television Comprehensive Entertainment Channel to be changed into Congress Channel 1 and Congress Channel 2, China Television News and Information Channel, China Television Education and Culture The station upgraded to a high-definition standard (HD) broadcast plan. On February 3, CTS Education and Culture Station officially upgraded to high-definition (HD) broadcast on terrestrial television.

On October 16, 2017, in order to continue the craze of the 2017 Universiade, the Sports Administration of the Ministry of Education commissioned China Television to launch a "Sports Events Channel". CTS Education and Culture Station will broadcast sports events at fixed times; Su Fangyu, Engineering Department Manager of CTS, said, CTS has applied to the NCC to change the operation plan of CTS Education and Culture Channel, and the CTS Education and Culture Channel is scheduled to be renamed "CTS Education, Sports and Culture Channel".

On December 15, 2017, CTS Education and Culture Channel officially changed its name to "CTS Education, Sports and Culture Channel".

== See also ==
- Media of Taiwan
