= CTV News Channel (Taiwanese TV channel) =

Television channel of Taiwan

- Country: Republic of China (Taiwan)
- Broadcast area: Worldwide
- Network: China Television
- Headquarters: Taipei City, Taiwan

Ownership
- Sister channels: CTi News

History
- Launched: July 1, 2004

CTV News Channel (Chinese: 中視新聞台; pinyin: Zhōng shì xīnwén tái) is a digital television channel operated by China Television (CTV) in Taiwan, launched on July 1, 2004.

== See also ==
- Media of Taiwan
