= Unique Business News =

Television channel of Taiwan

- Country: Taiwan
- Broadcast area: Taiwan, Kinmen, Mazu
- Network: Unique Satellite TV

Links
- Website: www.ustv.com.tw

Unique Business News (Chinese: 非凡新聞台; pinyin: feifan) is a satellite cable news channel operated by Unique Satellite TV in Taiwan. Unique Business News is the first local professional financial news network in Taiwan, which provides 24/7 news and global perspectives.

== See also ==
- Media of Taiwan
