= Japan Entertainment Television =

- Broadcast area: Taiwan, Hong Kong
- Headquarters: Singapore

History
- Launched: January 1997

Links
- Website: http://www.jettv.com.tw/

Japan Entertainment Television, or JET TV, is a television station in Taiwan that broadcasts programs relating to aspects of Japanese culture. It offers dramas, documentaries, animation and variety programs from five Tokyo-based commercial networks. JET TV launched in Taiwan in January 1997 under SEC TV. Its Singapore offices opened in March 1997.

For a short time, it aired subtitled or dubbed Japanese TV shows, especially Japanese Dramas, in the Philippines before it went off the air.
