= Public Television Service =

Independent public broadcasting institution in Taiwan

Taiwan Public Television Service Foundation 財團法人公共電視文化事業基金會
- Type: Free-to-air nationwide TV
- Country: Taiwan

Programming
- Languages: Standard Chinese (main channel), Hokkien (PTS Taigi)

History
- Launched: July 1, 1998

Links
- Website: www.pts.org.tw

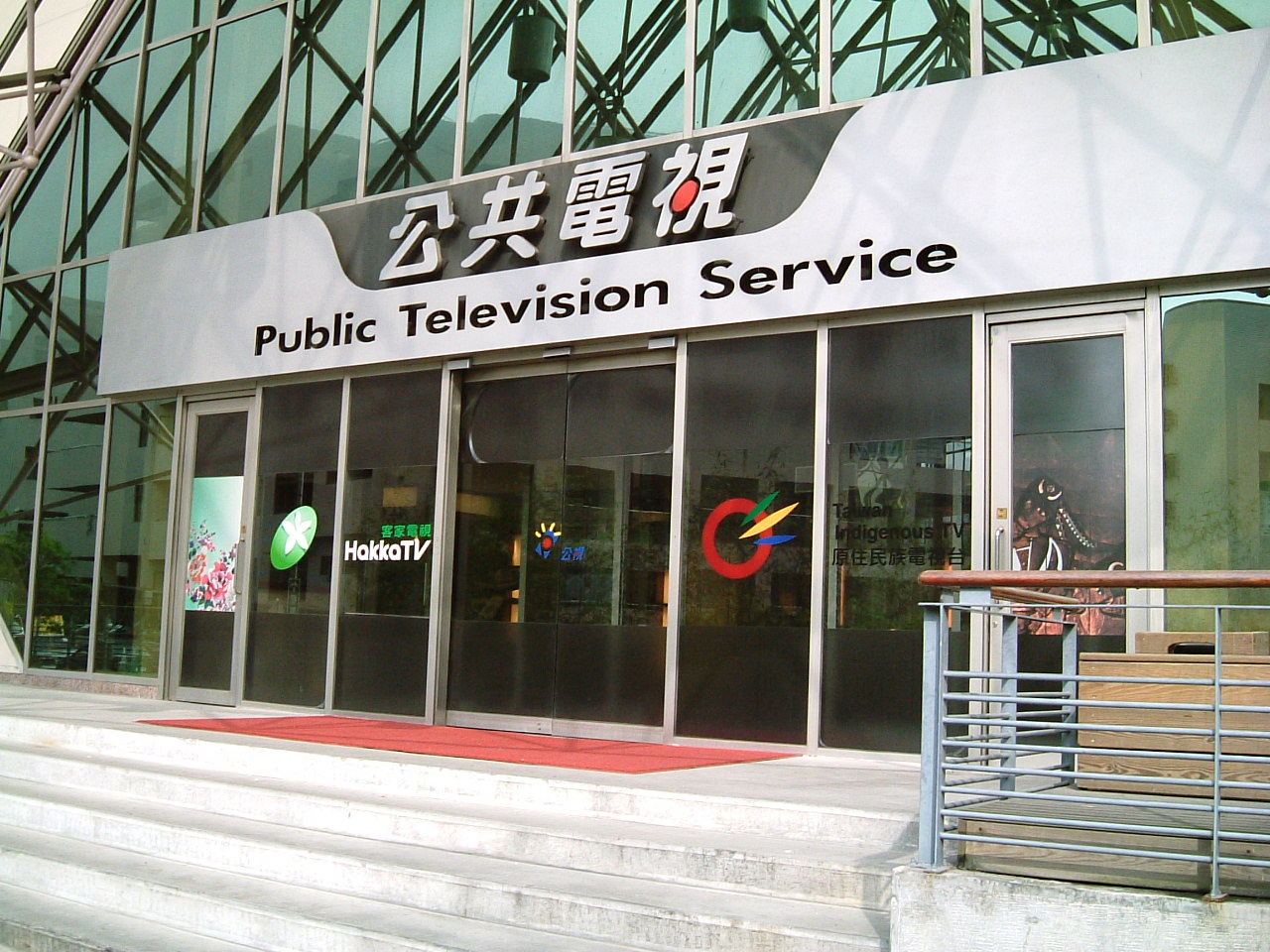
PTS B Building

Taiwan Public Television Service Foundation (PTS Foundation/Public Television Service Foundation, Chinese: 財團法人公共電視文化事業基金會; pinyin: Cáitúan Fǎrén Gōnggòng Diànshì Wénhuà Shìyè Jījīnhuì), also called Public Television Service (PTS, Chinese: 公共電視/公視; pinyin: Gōnggòng Diànshì/Gōngshì), is the first independent public broadcasting institution in Taiwan, which broadcasts the Public Television Service Taiwan. Although first proposed in 1980, it was not until 1984 that the executive-level Government Information Office (GIO), which regulates mass media activities and serves as the government press bureau, attempted to create a separate entity that would produce public interest programs for broadcast on the then-existing three terrestrial networks. Nevertheless, the Executive Yuan (one of Taiwan's five branches of government or yuans, and the one responsible for the GIO) later shifted the responsibility to the preexisting Chinese Public Television Broadcasting Development Fund. It was not until the early 1990s, following the lifting of martial law, that legislative efforts striving to create a public television station emerged in earnest. After much political wrangling and outcries over public and private resources used in lobbying and advocacy efforts, the final statutes creating PTS were enacted in 1997.

== A Part of TBS ==
Taiwan PTS is operated by the Public Television Service Foundation, which is a nonprofit, as an independent public service broadcaster.

=== History ===
In 2006, The Legislative Yuan completed the third reading and approved the Statute Regarding the Disposition of Government Shareholdings in the Terrestrial Television Industry, paving the road for Taiwan Broadcasting System (TBS). After Liming Foundation donated Chinese Television System (CTS) shares to the PTS Foundation, TBS was formed as a result. In 2007, Taiwan Indigenous Television (TITV), Hakka TV, and Taiwan Macroview Television (MACTV) join Taiwan Broadcasting System, completed the structure of TBS.

In 2020 the Taiwanese Ministry of Culture announced that they would be providing PTS with funding to produce English language programming. The following year, PTS launched PTS World Taiwan as "an international YouTube channel that offers an incredible variety of programmes for viewers worldwide"; the channel features content mainly in Mandarin and Taiwanese with English subtitles.

== PTS Channels ==
- PTS
- PTS Taigi
- PTS XS (formerly called HiHD/PTS HD, the first high-definition channel in Taiwan; and PTS3)

== See also ==
- List of Taiwanese television series
- Taiwan Indigenous Television (TITV)
- Censorship in Taiwan
- Press Freedom Index
