= PTS Taigi =

- Country: Republic of China (Taiwan)
- Broadcast area: Taiwan and surrounding communities
- Network: Taiwan Public Television Service Foundation

Programming
- Language(s): Taiwanese Hokkien

Ownership
- Owner: Taiwan Broadcasting System

History
- Launched: July 1, 2004
- Former names: Dimo TV (2004-2012); PTS2 (2012-2019)

Links
- Website: http://taigi.pts.org.tw/

Availability

Terrestrial
- Digital: Channel 26; LCN: 6 (HD)

PTS Taigi (Hàn-jī: 公視台語台; Taiwanese POJ: Kong-sī Tâi-gí-tâi; Tâi-lô: Kong-sī Tâi-gí-tâi; lit. PTS Taiwanese) is a digital television channel operated by Taiwan Public Television Service Foundation (PTS) in Taiwan and featuring the first 24-hour channel mainly in Taiwanese Hokkien in Taiwan.

The channel was launched in 2004 as Dimo TV (Digital Mobile TV), and was originally targeted toward “on-the-go” viewers via mobile TV-enabled mobile handsets or TV systems installed in vehicles. Since October 1, 2012, the channel was renamed as PTS2 (Chinese: 公視2台), and then be available in HD and featured mostly kids and educational programming since July 6, 2016. From July 1, 2019, PTS2 is renamed as PTS Taigi, based on the policy of establishing of public Taiwanese-language TV channel.
