= China Television =

Taiwanese television broadcasting company

China Television Company, Ltd. 中國電視公司
- Type: Television network, Satellite television and Cable television
- Industry: Television broadcasting
- Founded: September 3, 1968; 58 years ago
- Headquarters: Taipei, Taiwan
- Products: Television content, television programming
- Parent: Want Want China Times

Chinese name
- Traditional Chinese: 中國電視公司
- Simplified Chinese: 中国电视公司
Transcriptions
Standard Mandarin
- Hanyu Pinyin: Zhōngguó Diànshì Gōngsī
- Bopomofo: ㄓㄨㄥ ㄍㄨㄛˊ ㄉㄧㄢˋ ㄕˋ ㄍㄨㄥ ㄙ
Southern Min
- Hokkien POJ: Tiong-kok-tiān-sī-kong-si
- Website: www.ctv.com.tw

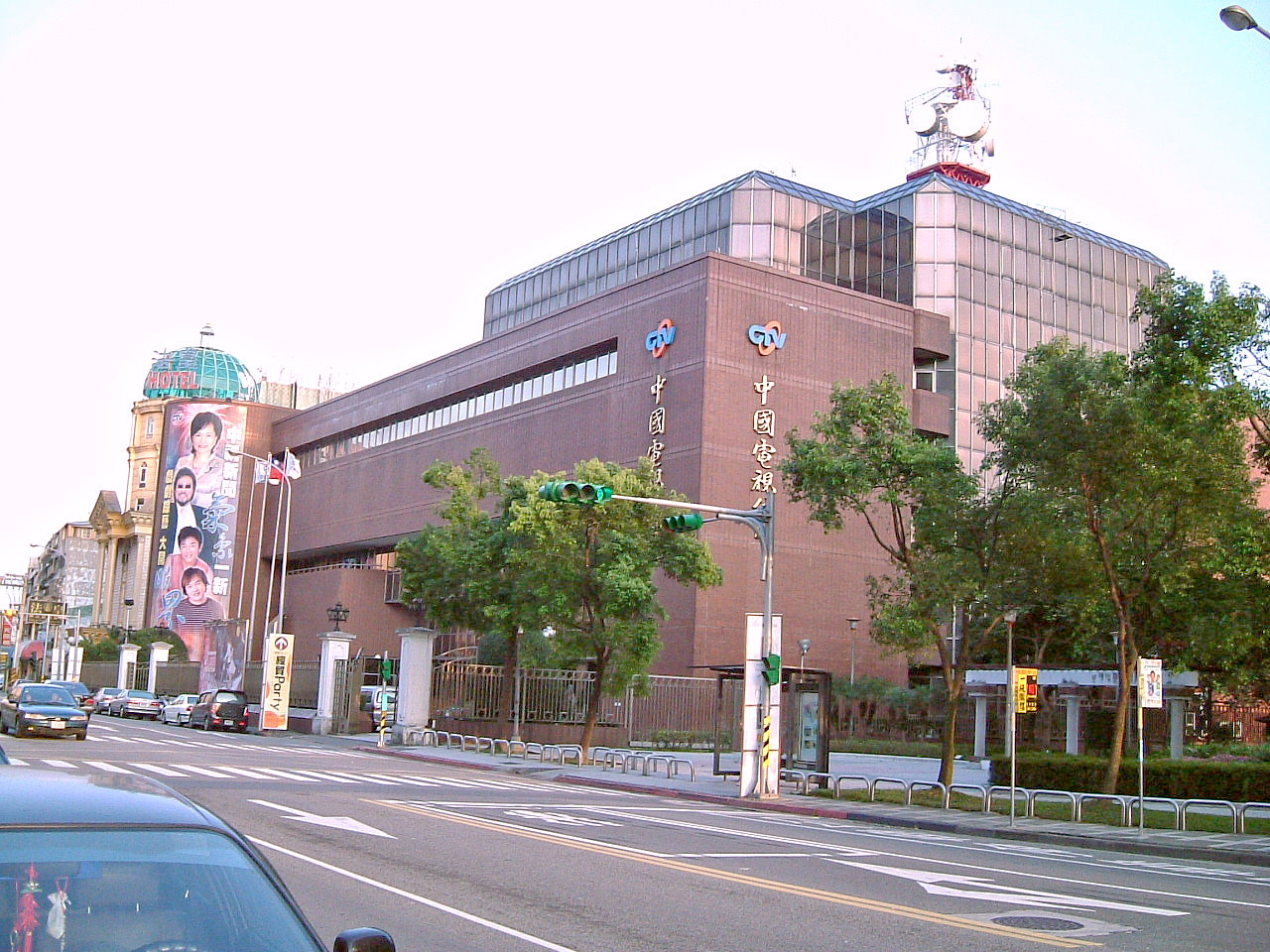
CTV building in Taipei City

China Television Company, Ltd. (CTV), formerly called Taiwan Daytime TV (TDT) from 1969 to 1975, is a television broadcasting company based in Taipei, Taiwan. It was established on September 3, 1968 by the then-ruling Kuomintang (KMT). The party owned the majority stake of the network. Trial broadcast started on October 9, 1969, and the channel formally started broadcasting on October 31 the same year. CTV was the first television channel to broadcast full colour television service to the whole island.

== History ==
China Television was established on September 3, 1968, and began broadcasting in 1969.

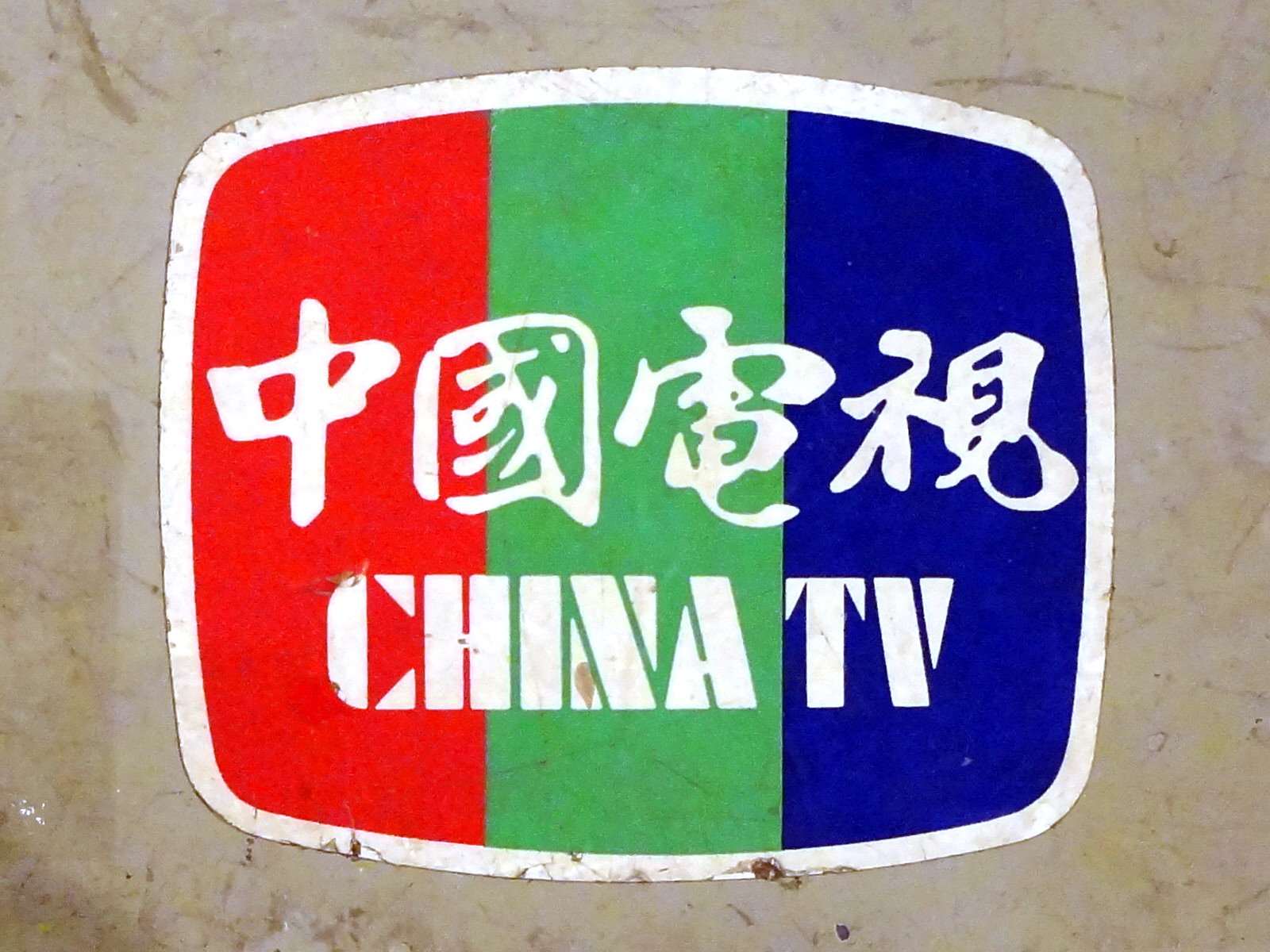
The third version of CTV logo (1980s-October 31, 1997) with Sun Yat-sen's calligraphy

On August 9, 1999, the channel was publicly listed on Taiwan Stock Exchange, becoming the first publicly listed broadcasting company on the island.

In 2006, due to effects borne by the media reform law in Taiwan requiring all political parties to divest their control in radio and television companies, 90% of CTV shares were sold to the China Times media group, effectively giving the station leeway to some of its satellite TV concerns, notably the Chung T'ien Television (CTi), one of major cable television programmers in Taiwan. Some CTV shows are now seen on CTi's two channels on cable.

It was the largest television channels on the island. Its shows consistently rated 2nd in all major time slots, and is home to Taiwan's most watched early evening newscast, the CTV News Global Report.

=== Funding allegations ===
In November 2019, Wang Liqiang, a self-proclaimed spy from the People's Republic of China (PRC) who defected to Australia, claimed, among other allegations, that CTV had received PRC funding in return for airing stories unfavorable of the ROC government on Taiwan.

CTV's parent company, The Want Want China Times Group, denied these allegations. The veracity of his claims has also been disputed by espionage experts, who suggested that his claims were made out of opportunism.

== Appearances ==
=== Test card ===
The testcard of CTV is PM5544.

== Channels ==
- CTV Main Channel
- CTV News Channel
- CTV Classic (formerly known as CTV MyLife)
- CTV Bravo (formerly known as CTV HD, the high-definition version channel available in terrestrial television. Launched on July 21, 2012)

== See also ==
- China Times
- Chung T'ien Television (CTi)
- List of Taiwanese television series
