= Yan Yuxin =

Chinese news anchor

- 严於信
- Born: January 28, 1987 (age 39); Beijing, China
- Education: Communication University of China
- Occupation: News anchor
- Years active: 2009–present
- Known for: Xinwen Lianbo

Chinese name
- Simplified Chinese: 严於信
- Traditional Chinese: 嚴於信
Transcriptions
Standard Mandarin
- Hanyu Pinyin: Yán Yúxìn

Yan Yuxin (born 28 January 1987) is a Chinese news anchor for China Central Television, the main state announcer of China. He is known all over China as an announcer for the 7:00 pm CCTV News program Xinwen Lianbo, which has reach all over China on various networks and internationally, is one of the most watched news programs in the world.

== Biography ==
Yan was born in Beijing, on January 28, 1987, while his ancestral home in Shaanxi. He graduated from the Communication University of China. In 2007, he became an intern in Taizhou radio and TV station. In 2008, he joined the China Central Television and became a news anchor for CCTV-13. He hosted Xinwen Lianbo since September 23, 2020.

== Television ==
- Midnight News
- Morning News
- Xinwen Lianbo
