= Wang Yinqi =

Chinese news anchor (born 1991)

- 王音棋
- Born: 1 May 1991 (age 35); Xinghua, Jiangsu, China
- Education: Communication University of China
- Occupation: News anchor
- Years active: 2013–present

Wang Yinqi (Chinese: 王音棋; pinyin: Wáng Yīnqí; born 1 May 1991) is a Chinese news anchor for China Central Television, the main state announcer of China. She is known all over China as an announcer for the 7:00 pm CCTV News program Xinwen Lianbo, which has reach all over China on various networks and internationally, is one of the most watched news programs in the world.

== Biography ==
Wang was born in Xinghua, Jiangsu, on 1 May 1991. She attended the Xinghua High School. In 2009, she enrolled at the Communication University of China, where she was a trainee reporter for the HunanTV News of the Hunan Broadcasting System in 2010.

On 9 January 2013, Wang became a news anchor for the Live News of the CCTV-13. She was news anchor for 24 Hours in 2014 and subsequently Morning News in 2015. On 5 October 2023, she hosted her first newscast on Xinwen Lianbo (or News Simulcast).

== Television ==
- HunanTV News (2010)
- Live News (2013)
- 24 Hours (2014)
- Morning News (2015)
- Xinwen Lianbo (since 2023)
