= Sang Chen =

- 桑晨
- Born: July 3, 1973 (age 53); Beijing, China
- Education: Communication University of China
- Occupation: Host
- Years active: 1996–present
- Television: China Central Television
- Children: 1

Sang Chen (Chinese: 桑晨; pinyin: Sāng Chén; born 3 July 1973) is a Chinese television host.

== Biography ==
Sang was born in Beijing on July 3, 1973. After graduating from the Communication University of China in 1996, she joined the China Central Television, working as a host of Together Across the Strait. She is the host of Memoirs of the Nation and Across the Strait.

== Personal life ==
Sang Chen is married and has a daughter.
