= Xue Fei (host) =

Chinese host and educator

- 薛飞
- Education: Communication University of China
- Occupations: Host, educator
- Years active: 1982–present
- Known for: Xinwen Lianbo

Xue Fei (simplified Chinese: 薛飞; traditional Chinese: 薛飛; pinyin: Xuē Fēi) is a Chinese host and educator.

== Biography ==
After graduating from Communication University of China in 1982, he was assigned to China Central Television to host Xinwen Lianbo.

Xue was forced to resign for expressing sympathy when he reported the 1989 Tiananmen Square protests with Li Ruiying on June 5, 1989.

In 1992, Xue settled in Hungary.

Xue returned to China in 2001. He is now the President of the Department of Broadcasting, China Women's University and Beijing Culture and Arts School.

== Works ==
=== Television ===
- Xinwen Lianbo (1982–1989) (Chinese: 新闻联播)

== See also ==
- Tian'anmen Square protests of 1989
