= Lang Yongchun =

Chinese television host

- 郎永淳
- Born: July 23, 1971 (age 55); Suining County, Jiangsu, China
- Education: Nanjing University of Chinese Medicine; Communication University of China
- Occupation: News anchor
- Years active: 1995-present
- Known for: Xinwen Lianbo
- Television: China Central Television (CCTV)
- Spouse: Wu Ping (m. 1997)
- Children: 1

Lang Yongchun (Chinese: 郎永淳; pinyin: Láng Yǒngchún; born 23 July 1971) is a former Chinese news anchor best known for his work at China Central Television (CCTV), the main state broadcaster of China. He was best known in China as the announcer for the 7:00 pm CCTV News program Xinwen Lianbo, between 2011 and 2015.

== Biography ==
Lang was born in Suining County, Jiangsu in July 1971. He graduated from the Nanjing University of Chinese Medicine and the Communication University of China.

Lang joined the China Central Television in 1995, he hosted the mid-day newscast News 30 Minutes and Morning News. Beginning in 2011 he became a major anchor on the evening Xinwen Lianbo program, considered the most important news program in the country.

In 2011, Lang Yongchun's wife was eventually diagnosed as suffering from breast cancer; she is currently being treated in the United States. In order to take care of her and their son, who was studying in the United States, Lang Yongchun resigned on September 3, 2015. On September 2, after he had already tendered his resignation to CCTV, he nonetheless anchored that evening's Xinwen Lianbo program.

On October 5, 2017, Lang was arrested in Beijing for drunk driving.

== Works ==
=== Television ===
- News 30 Minutes (Chinese: 新闻30分)
- Xinwen Lianbo

=== Book ===
- Love, Yongchun

== Personal life ==
Lang married his classmate Wu Ping (吴萍) in 1997, they have a son, Lang Yu (郎俁).
