= Du Xian (news anchor) =

Chinese news anchor, journalist, and professor

- 杜宪
- Born: September 23, 1954 (age 71); Beijing, China
- Education: Communication University of China
- Occupations: News anchor, journalist, professor
- Years active: 1982-present
- Known for: Xinwen Lianbo
- Television: Phoenix Television
- Spouse: Chen Daoming (m. 1982)
- Children: 1

Chinese name
- Traditional Chinese: 杜憲
- Simplified Chinese: 杜宪
Transcriptions
Standard Mandarin
- Hanyu Pinyin: Dù Xiàn

Du Xian (Chinese: 杜宪; born 23 September 1954) is a Chinese news anchor and television host.

== Biography ==
Du was born in Beijing in 1954. She is daughter of Du Qinghua, an academician of the Chinese Academy of Engineering.

After graduating from Communication University of China in 1982, she was assigned to China Central Television to host Xinwen Lianbo.

On June 4, 1989, Zhang Hongmin and she anchored the Xinwen Lianbo broadcast reporting on the military crackdown on the Tiananmen Square protests. Du appeared on air wearing a black outfit and was visibly choked up during the broadcast; she was forced to resign as a result of her perceived expression of sympathy for the student protesters.

In 1997, Du joined Phoenix Television and hosted We Only Have One Earth, Crossing the Sand Line, and Looking for the Faraway Homeland. After leaving Phoenix Television in 2002, she joined the Communication University of China as an teacher and retired in 2014.

== Works ==
=== Television ===
- Xinwen Lianbo
- We Only Have One Earth (Chinese: 我们只有一个地球)
- Crossing the Sand Line (Chinese: 穿越风沙线)
- Looking for the Faraway Homeland (Chinese: 寻找远去的家园)

=== Book ===
- My 106 days in America (Chinese: 我在美国的106天)

== Personal life ==
Du is married to Chinese actor Chen Daoming; their daughter, Chen Ge (陈格), was born in 1985.

== See also ==
- Xinwen Lianbo
- China Central Television
- Phoenix Television
- 1989 Tiananmen Square protests and massacre
- Communication University of China
- Chen Daoming
- Chinese television
