= CCTV News (disambiguation) =

CCTV News commonly refers to CGTN (TV channel), formerly CCTV-9 and CCTV-NEWS, an English language news channel.

CCTV News may also refer to:

- CCTV News, the news department itself, of China Central Television
- CCTV-13 (formerly CCTV-新闻), a Chinese language news channel
