= Zhang Xiquan =

Chinese film and television director

- Education: Communication University of China
- Occupation: Director

Zhang Xiquan (Chinese: 张溪泉) is a Chinese film and television director at China Central Television (CCTV). Since 2004, he has been involved in the productions of more than 30 sports documentaries in China. In 2012, Zhang's feature documentary film Burn was shortlisted at Taiwan Golden Horse Awards.

Zhang's 2019 documentary film Tuva Youngster Yongdeng won the Best Short Film at the 2019 San Diego International Children's Film Festival; it was nominated for the Best Documentary at the 2019 Cannes Mediterranean Film Festival; and it was honored the Jury Special Award at the Nanshan International Mountain Film Festival in Shenzhen, China. The film will represent China at the 2020 Kendall International Mountain Film Festival.

Zhang serves as the producer and director of photography for a feature documentary film entitled Almost Naked, expect to be released in 2020. Zhang received a master's degree in Film and Television from the Communication University of China. He is based in Beijing, China.
