= Li Xiuping =

Former Chinese television presenter

- 李修平
- Born: 16 February 1963 (age 63); Lanzhou, Gansu, China
- Education: Communication University of China
- Occupation: Anchor
- Years active: 1989-2014
- Known for: Xinwen Lianbo
- Television: China Central Television (CCTV)
- Spouse: Zhang Chunxian
- Children: 1
- Relatives: Li Linxu (father)
- Awards: Golden Mike Award; 2009

Li Xiuping (Chinese: 李修平; pinyin: Lǐ Xiūpíng; born 16 February 1963) is a former Chinese news anchor for China Central Television (CCTV), the main state announcer of China.

She is known as a former announcer for the 7:00 pm CCTV news program Xinwen Lianbo, which, with its reach across China and internationally, is one of the most watched news programs in the world.

== Biography ==
Li was born in February 1963 in Lanzhou, Gansu. Her father Li Linxu (Chinese: 李林绪) was a bridge engineer who worked at the First Surveying & Designing Institute of the Ministry of Railways.

She entered Communication University of China in 1983, majoring in broadcasting, where she graduated in 1987. After graduation, she joined the Gansu Television.

Li anchored the Xinwen Lianbo since October 13, 1989.

She won the Golden Mike Award in 2009.

In February 2013, Li was employed as a professor at Northwest Normal University.

== Works ==
=== Television ===
- Xinwen Lianbo (Chinese: 新闻联播)

== Awards ==
- 2009 Golden Mike Award.

== Personal life ==
Li was married to a Chinese politician Zhang Chunxian, who is a member of the Politburo of the Chinese Communist Party and the secretary of Xinjiang Uygur Autonomous Regional Committee of the Chinese Communist Party. The couple has a daughter.
