= Pan Tao =

Chinese news anchor

- 潘涛
- Born: July 12, 1971 (age 55); Beijing, China
- Education: Communication University of China
- Occupation: News anchor
- Years active: 1990–present
- Known for: Xinwen Lianbo
- Television: China Central Television (CCTV)

Chinese name
- Simplified Chinese: 潘涛
- Traditional Chinese: 潘濤
Transcriptions
Standard Mandarin
- Hanyu Pinyin: Pān Tāo

Pan Tao (born July 12, 1971) is a Chinese news anchor for China Central Television, the main state announcer of China. He is known all over China as an announcer for the 7:00 pm CCTV News program Xinwen Lianbo, which has reach all over China on various networks and internationally, is one of the most watched news programs in the world.

== Biography ==
Pan was born in Beijing and raised in Chengdu, Sichuan. His mother in Sichuan People's Art Theater. He has a brother named Pan Xun. After graduating from Communication University of China, he became a news anchor for Sichuan Radio and Television. In 1998, he joined the Dragon Television in Shanghai. He was transferred to China Central Television in 2016, and hosted Xinwen Lianbo since September 10, 2020.

== Personal life ==
Pan is married and has a daughter.
