= Zhang Mengmeng =

Chinese sports commentator

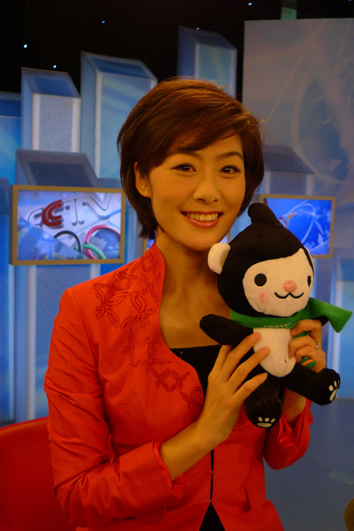
- Zhang Mengmeng
- Born: July 8, 1980 (age 45); Jinan, Shandong, China
- Education: Communication University of China
- Occupation(s): CCTV-5 sport announcer and commentator
- Years active: 2005–present

Zhang Mengmeng (Chinese: 张萌萌; born July 8, 1980) is a sport announcer and commentator for China Central Television, who specializes in synchronised swimming and diving. Prior to joining CCTV-5, Zhang won the Who will Commentate the Beijing Olympics sport announcer competition in 2005. She received a sport broadcasting award for young announcers in 2010.

From Jinan, Shandong, Zhang Mengmeng achieved outstanding results in various national synchronized swimming competitions, and made the national youth team two times. She was also an aerobic and rhythmic gymnast at the national level. In addition, she is a national-level referee in swimming, aerobics, rhythmic gymnastics, track and field, as well as tennis, volleyball, basketball and table tennis.

== Controversy ==
On August 11, 2012, Zhang Mengmeng announced the semi-finals of the men's 10 metre platform diving competition at the 2012 Summer Olympics live on CCTV-13, along with diver Hu Jia. For some time she forgot to turn off the microphone, resulting in her private comments on British and Australian athletes being clearly overheard, which caused an internet uproar in China.
