= Kang Hui =

Kang Hui may refer to:

- Kang Hui, personal name of Gonggong in Chinese mythology
- Kang Hui (news anchor) (born 1972), Chinese news anchor
- Kang Hui (actor) (born 1991), South Korean actor
