= Ouyang Xiadan =

Chinese news anchor

- 欧阳夏丹
- Born: July 28, 1977 (age 49); Qixing District, Guilin, Guangxi, China
- Education: Communication University of China
- Occupation: Host
- Years active: 1999–2020; 2023–present
- Television: Xinwen Lianbo
- Awards: Golden Mike Award; 2007; Golden Eagle Award for Best Programme Host; 2008

Ouyang Xiadan (simplified Chinese: 欧阳夏丹; traditional Chinese: 歐陽夏丹; pinyin: Ōuyáng Xiàdān; born 28 July 1977) is a former Chinese news anchor best known for her tenure at China Central Television (CCTV) from 2003 to 2020. She won the Golden Mike Award in 2007 and the Golden Eagle Award for Best Program Host in 2008. She was forcibly disappeared in 2020, reportedly due to ties with Sun Lijun, and reemerged on social media in 2023.

== Biography ==
Ouyang was born in July 1977 in Qixing District of Guilin, Guangxi. She graduated from Guilin High School as her city's top liberal arts student in the gaokao and was admitted to the Communication University of China in 1995, where she majored in broadcasting and graduated in 1999. Upon graduation, she declined a guaranteed postgraduate placement at the university and instead began her career at Shanghai Television, where she anchored the Shanghai Morning and Evening News for four years.

In 2003, she joined CCTV, where she anchored the morning show First Time between 2003 and 2009. She was also one of the hosts of the CCTV New Year's Gala in 2010. From August 8, 2011, to April 28, 2020, she co-anchored Xinwen Lianbo, China's most prominent news program, before disappearing from public view, reportedly due to an investigation into her connections with disgraced official Sun Lijun. She reemerged after three years on January 1, 2023, with a post on Douyin, and began working as a part-time instructor at a training academy specializing in preparing high school students for China's university entrance exams in broadcasting and performing arts. In June of that year, CCTV removed her name from its list of anchors. In 2024, she launched accounts on Bilibili and WeChat Video.

== Works ==
=== Television ===
- Evening News (Chinese: 新闻夜线)
- Shanghai Morning (Chinese: 上海早晨)
- First Time (Chinese: 第一时间)
- Focus on (Chinese: 共同关注)
- Xinwen Lianbo (Chinese: 新闻联播)

== Awards ==
- First Time - 2007 Golden Mike Award.
- 2008 Golden Eagle Award for Best Programme Host
