= Liu Chunyan =

Chinese host and actress

- 刘纯燕
- Born: 20 August 1966 (age 60); Beijing, China
- Other name: Jin Guizi (金龟子)
- Education: Communication University of China
- Occupations: Host, actress
- Years active: 1983 - present
- Known for: Big Pinwheel
- Television: China Central Television (CCTV)
- Spouse: Wang Ning
- Children: 1
- Awards: Golden Mic Award; 1999; Golden Mic Award; 2011; Flying Apsaras Award; 1989

Chinese name
- Traditional Chinese: 劉純燕
- Simplified Chinese: 刘纯燕
Transcriptions
Standard Mandarin
- Hanyu Pinyin: Liú Chúnyàn

Jin Guizi
- Traditional Chinese: 金龜子
- Simplified Chinese: 金龟子
Transcriptions
Standard Mandarin
- Hanyu Pinyin: Jīn Guīzǐ

Liu Chunyan (Chinese: 刘纯燕; born 20 August 1966), better known by her stage name Jin Guizi (金龟子; 'golden scarab'), is a Chinese television host and voice actress. She won the Golden Mic Award in both 1999 and 2011, and received the Flying Apsaras Award for Best Female Voice Actress in 1989.

== Biography ==
Liu was born in Beijing in August 1966, with her ancestral home in Chengdu, Sichuan. She graduated from the Communication University of China in 1990, where she majored in broadcast. In her early career, she was best known for her voice role as Hua Xiren in the 1987 television classic Dream of the Red Chamber, Beibei in the Fuwa tv series, as well as the Chinese voice dub of Minnie Mouse, Mighty Atom and Doraemon. She joined China Central Television (CCTV) in 1991 and has co-hosted the variety show Zhengda Variety (正大综艺) and the children's television show Big Pinwheel (大风车), the latter of which she was better known for. She initially went by the stage name "Little Antlers" (小角丫) when hosting Big Pinwheel and its sub-program Smart House (聪明屋) with senior co-host Dong Hao and later He Jiong, before eventually switched to "Golden Scarab" (金龟子) after the CCTV program re-structuring in 1997.

== Works ==
=== Television ===
- Big Pinwheel (大风车)
- Fuwa (福娃)

=== Film ===
- Secret Plans (2014)
- Stand By Me Doraemon (dub Chinese mainland edition)(2015)
- Doraemon the Movie: Nobita's Treasure Island (dub Chinese mainland edition)(2018)

== Awards ==
- 1989 Flying Apsaras Award for Best Female Voice Actress
- 1999 Golden Mike Award
- 2011 Golden Mike Award

== Personal life ==
Liu was married to Wang Ning, a news presenter for China Central Television. They have a daughter, Wang Yichen (Chinese: 王逸宸).
