= Liu Xiaoqian =

Liu Xiaoqian may refer to:

- Liu Xiaoqian (journalist)
- Liu Xiaoqian (rugby union)
