= Zheng Li (news anchor) =

Chinese news anchor

- 郑丽
- Born: November 5, 1974 (age 51); Kedong County, Heilongjiang, China
- Education: Qiqihar University
- Occupation: News anchor
- Years active: 1997–present
- Known for: Xinwen Lianbo
- Television: China Central Television (CCTV)

Chinese name
- Simplified Chinese: 郑丽
- Traditional Chinese: 鄭麗
Transcriptions
Standard Mandarin
- Hanyu Pinyin: Zhèng Lì

Zheng Li (Chinese: 郑丽; born November 5, 1974) is a Chinese news anchor for China Central Television, the main state announcer of China. She is known all over China as an announcer for the 7:00 pm CCTV News program Xinwen Lianbo, which has reach all over China on various networks and internationally, is one of the most watched news programs in the world.

== Biography ==
Zheng was born in Kedong County, Heilongjiang, on November 5, 1974. In 1993, she was admitted to Qiqihar University, where she majored in Chinese. After graduating in 1997, she was dispatched to Heilongjiang Television Station as a news anchor. In October 2002, she was recruited in the China Central Television (CCTV) and hosted several news programs such as Midnight News. On September 24, 2021, she hosted her first newscast on Xinwen Lianbo (or News Simulcast).

== Television ==
- News 8:00
- Morning News
- News 30'
- Live News
- Midnight News
- Focus on
- News Community
- Year after Year
- Xinwen Lianbo (or News Simulcast)
