= Chen Yin =

Chen Yin may refer to:

- Chen Yin (6th century) (born 573), crown prince of the Chinese Chen dynasty
- Chen Yin (swimmer) (born 1986), Chinese swimmer
- Chen Yin (TV presenter), Chinese television program host
