= Bao Xiaofeng =

Chinese news anchor

- 宝晓峰
- Born: November 22, 1979 (age 46); Hohhot, Inner Mongolia, China
- Education: Communication University of China
- Occupation: News anchor
- Years active: 2001–present
- Known for: Xinwen Lianbo
- Television: China Central Television (CCTV)

Chinese name
- Simplified Chinese: 宝晓峰
- Traditional Chinese: 寶曉峰
Transcriptions
Standard Mandarin
- Hanyu Pinyin: Bǎo Xiǎofēng

Bao Xiaofeng (Chinese: 宝晓峰; born November 22, 1979) is a Chinese news anchor for China Central Television, the main state announcer of China. She is of Mongol descent. She is known all over China as an announcer for the 7:00 pm CCTV News program Xinwen Lianbo, which has reach all over China on various networks and internationally, is one of the most watched news programs in the world.

== Biography ==
Bao was born in Hohhot, Inner Mongolia, on November 22, 1979, with her ancestral home in Liaoning. She attended Xinhuajie School and Hohhot Experimental Middle School. She secondary studied at Hohhot Tumet High School. In 1997, she was admitted to the Communication University of China, majoring in the Broadcasting Department. After graduating in 2001, she was recruited in the China Central Television (CCTV) and hosted several news programs such as Live News Room. On September 12, 2020, she hosted her first newscast on Xinwen Lianbo (or News Simulcast).

== Television ==
- Asia Report
- News 8:00
- Media Plaza
- Morning News
- News 30'
- Live News
- Midnight News
- Focus on
- Xinwen Lianbo (or News Simulcast)
