= Tian Yiming =

- Born: Tian Xin (田欣); October 14, 1989 (age 36); China
- Education: Communication University of China
- Genre: Mandopop
- Occupations: Singer, songwriter, internet personality
- Years active: 2009–present
- Label: Kugou Live Fanxing Mutual Entertainment

Tian Yiming (Chinese: 田一名; pinyin: Tián Yīmíng; born 14 October 1989), born Tian Xin (Chinese: 田欣), is a Chinese singer, songwriter, and internet personality. He achieved international viral fame in 2021 for his cover of the song "热爱105°C的你", which became a widespread Internet meme commonly referred to as "Super Idol". He is known for his professional broadcasting background and his stylized "oily" (油腻) performance aesthetic.

== Early life and education ==
Tian was born in 1989 in China. In 1997, he had a minor role as a child actor in a TVB series. He attended the Communication University of China (CUC) in Beijing, graduating from the Department of Broadcasting and Hosting in 2009. His formal training in broadcast media is credited with his precise vocal control and composed camera presence.

== Career ==
=== Early career (2009–2020) ===
Following graduation, Tian worked in musical theater and television. In 2010, he performed in the musical God's Intent and appeared in reenactments for the program Legal Scene (现场说法). In 2015, he won first place in the Meizhou regional division of the Cantonese singing competition Mai Wang Zheng Ba (麦王争霸; King of Mic).

He began releasing studio music in 2018 with the single "Only You Left" (只剩你了) and "I This Life" (我这一生) in 2020, establishing a career as a Mandopop balladeer on the Kugou Live platform.

=== "Super Idol" and global viral fame (2021–2024) ===
In 2021, Tian posted a cover of "热爱105°C的你" (Loving You at 105°C) online. The video, characterized by its "oily" (油腻) persona and high-contrast visuals, went viral globally. In the West, the video became known as the "Super Idol" meme and was frequently used as a bait-and-switch prank.

During this period, his image became unintentionally associated with satirical social credit system memes on platforms such as TikTok and YouTube. In November 2021, Tian appeared on the reality competition Point! Talent Show (点赞！达人秀), performing "Ring Ring Ring".

=== Concert career and international activities (2025–present) ===
On 31 March 2025, Tian met American YouTuber IShowSpeed in Chengdu. Their joint livestream, featuring a performance of "Super Idol", drew millions of viewers globally.

On 17 August 2025, Tian held his first solo concert, Magic Sound Rhapsody, at the Bandai Namco Shanghai Cultural Center. The 1,000-capacity event sold out its base-tier tickets and featured the debut of nine new songs. In late 2025, he released the EP Marginal Life (偏旁人生).

== Discography ==
=== EPs ===
- The Last Night (最后一夜) (2021)
- The Moon Doesn't Sleep, I Don't Sleep (月亮不睡我不睡) (2024)
- Marginal Life (偏旁人生) (2025)

=== Singles ===
- "I This Life" (我这一生) (2020)
- "Hard to Break Love" (情难断) (2020)
- "Tell Me"(2021)
- "Puppet Show" (木偶戏) (2022)
- "Gentleman's Six Arts" (君子六艺) (2023)
- "Super Idol" (2025)
- "Magic Sound Rhapsody" (魔音狂想曲) (2025)
- "Just Say Hello" (2026)
