= Zhijian =

Zhijian
Traditional	智健	志健	志堅
Simplified	智健	志健	志坚
Mandarin Pinyin	Zhìjiàn		Zhìjiān
Cantonese Yale	Jigihn		Jigīn

Zhijian is the Pinyin spelling of a number of different Chinese given names. These names are also spelled Chih-chien in the Wade–Giles romanisation common in Taiwan, and Chi-kin in typical Hong Kong Cantonese spelling (though some names with that spelling would be pronounced Zijian in Mandarin). Some ways of writing this name are listed in the table at right.

== Notable people with this name ==
Politics and government

- Liu Zhijian (刘志坚, 1912–2006), People's Liberation Army general
- Zhang Zhijian (张志坚, born 1934), People's Liberation Army general
- Bai Zhijian (白志健, born 1948), director of the Liaison Office of the Central People's Government in the Macau Special Administrative Region
- Fung Chi-kin (馮志堅, born 1949), former Hong Kong Legislative Councilmember
- Kwong Chi-kin (鄺志堅, born 1958), Hong Kong Federation of Trade Unions politician
- Lin Chih-chien (林智堅, born 1975), Taiwanese politician, mayor of Hsinchu City

Sport

- Tam Chi Kin (譚智健, born 1980), Hong Kong swimmer
- Chao Chih-chien (趙志堅, born 1983), Taiwanese track and field athlete
- Zhi-Gin Lam (林志堅, born 1991), Hong Kong football player
- Lee Chi Kin (李志堅), Hong Kong football manager

Other

- Xuedou Zhijian (雪窦智鑑, 1105–1192), Song dynasty Buddhist monk
- Li Zhijian (李志坚, born 1928), microelectronics pioneer at Tsinghua University
- Larry Yung Chi-kin (榮智健, born 1942), former chairman of CITIC Pacific
- Guo Zhijian (郭志坚, born 1971), China Central Television news anchor
- Sammy Leung Chi-kin (梁志健, born 1973), disc jockey for Hong Kong Commercial Radio
- Zhijian James Chen (陈志坚), professor of biochemistry at the University of Texas Southwestern Medical Center

== See also ==
- Ellesmere Choi (蔡子健, born 1969), Hong Kong television actor
- Chui Chi-kin (徐子見), Hong Kong politician (Eastern District Council)
- Derek Kwok (郭子健), Hong Kong film director
