= Li Zimeng =

Chinese news anchor and television host

- 李梓萌
- Born: Li Meng; July 11, 1977 (age 49); Heping District, Shenyang, Liaoning, China
- Education: Communication University of China
- Occupation: Host
- Years active: 2000-present
- Known for: Xinwen Lianbo
- Television: China Central Television (CCTV)
- Relatives: Father: Li Zhonglu

Li Zimeng (Chinese: 李梓萌; pinyin: Lǐ Zǐméng; born 11 July 1977), also known as Li Meng, is a Chinese newsreader for China Central Television, the main state announcer of China.

Li is known all over China as an newsreader for the 7:00 pm CCTV News program Xinwen Lianbo, which has reach all over China on various networks and internationally, is one of the most watched news programs in the world.

== Biography ==
Li was born in Heping District of Shenyang, Liaoning, with her ancestral home in Heze, Shandong. She is the daughter of Li Zhonglu (李忠鲁), a politician who served as the Vice-President of the Shenyang National People's Congress.

Li hosted Xinwen Lianbo since December 2007.

== Works ==
=== Television ===
- Culture Express (Chinese: 文化报道)
- World Express (Chinese: 国际时讯)
- Xinwen Lianbo (Chinese: 新闻联播)
