= Li Ruiying =

Chinese television personality

- 李瑞英
- Born: 16 July 1961 (age 65); Beijing, China
- Education: Communication University of China
- Occupation: Anchor
- Years active: 1989-present
- Known for: Xinwen Lianbo
- Television: China Central Television (CCTV)
- Political party: Chinese Communist Party
- Spouse: Zhang Yuyan
- Children: 1

Li Ruiying (Chinese: 李瑞英; pinyin: Lǐ Ruìyīng; born 16 July 1961) is a Chinese media personality and politician, best known for being the long-time anchor of the China Central Television (CCTV) program Xinwen Lianbo.

Li is the vice-president of China Association of Radio and Television and China Hosts Association, and the Chairman of the Broadcast, CCTV. Li was a delegate to the 18th National Congress of the Chinese Communist Party and the All-China Youth Federation, and a member of the 9th, 10th, 11th National Committee of the Chinese People's Political Consultative Conference.

== Biography ==
Li was born in Beijing in July 1961, with her ancestral home in Nanle County, Henan.

Li was graduated from Communication University of China in 1983, majoring in broadcasting.

After graduation, Li worked in Jiangsu Television. She was transferred to Communication University of China as a teacher in 1986, then she joined the CCTV. Li anchored the Xinwen Lianbo since 1989. Li also appeared briefly at the CCTV New Year's Gala in 2008 during the winter storms to read a poem with other television and film personalities.

Li and fellow anchor Zhang Hongmin left Xinwen Lianbo in May 2014. She was subsequently said to have begun pursuing work in television anchor training. Some overseas Chinese-language news outlets have linked Li's departure from Xinwen Lianbo to the corruption case surrounding former prominent official Ling Jihua, though this has not been confirmed.

At CCTV, Li was said to have earned 280,000 yuan a month, which is roughly equivalent to an annual salary of $530,000 a year.

== Personal life ==
In 1987, Li was married to a Chinese scholar, Zhang Yuyan (Chinese: 张宇燕), who is a researcher in Chinese Academy of Social Sciences, the couple have a son.
