= Chen Luyu =

Chinese journalist and talk show host

- Born: June 12, 1970 (age 55); Shanghai, China
- Occupation: Presenter

Chen Luyu (simplified Chinese: 陈鲁豫; traditional Chinese: 陳魯豫; pinyin: Chén Lǔyù, born 12 June 1970) is a Chinese television host. She started her career at CCTV in 1993 and joined Phoenix TV in 1996. She is known for her talk show A Date With Luyu (2002—2022) and podcast Flowers on the Rock (2023—).

== Awards ==
- Jessica magazine's (Hong Kong) "2007 Most Successful Women" title

TV shows:

- A Date with Luyu

Education:

- Communication University of China
- Tsinghua University High School
- Experimental Middle School Affiliated to Beijing Normal University
