= Ding Rong =

Chinese painter and photographer

丁融
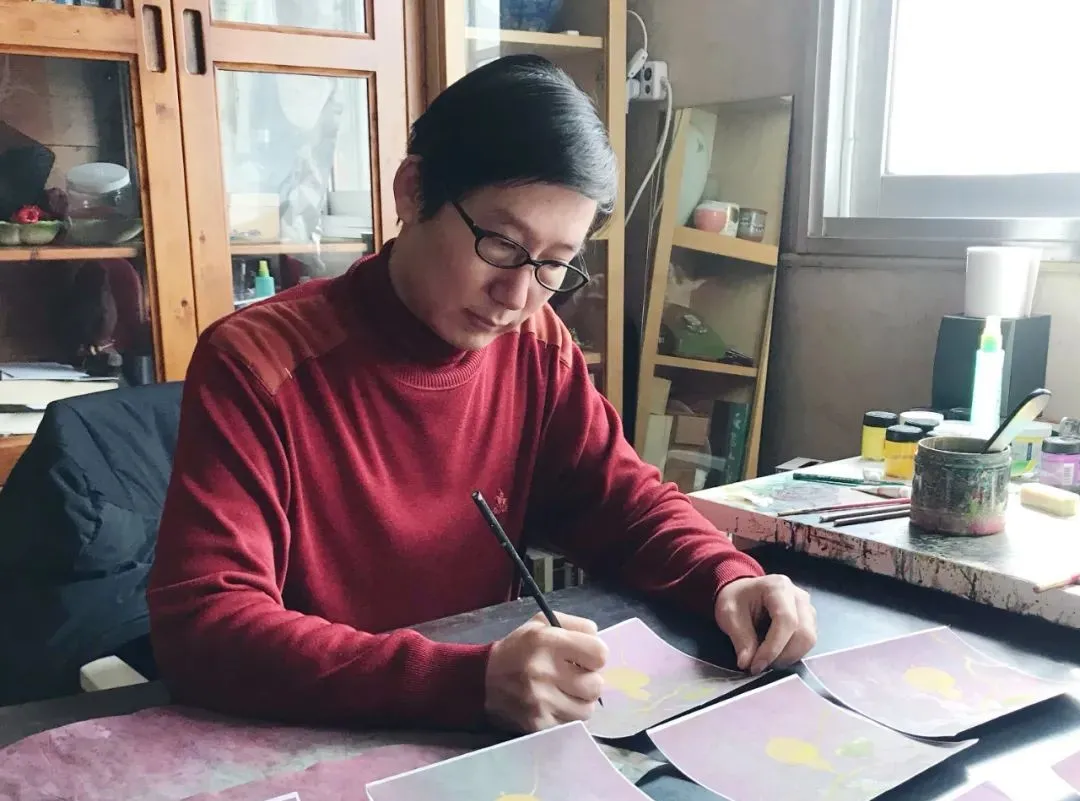
- Born: 1970 (age 55–56)
- Education: Communication University of China

Rong Ding (Mandarin: 丁融, born 1970), also known as Ding Rong, is a Chinese painter and photographer. He is a member of Shenzhen Artists Association and Shanghai Artists Association.

== Early life and education ==
Rong was born in Shanghai in 1970. He graduated from the Journalism Department of the Communication University of China in 1983.

== Works ==
Rong's work mainly focuses on flora and fauna of his homeland. In recent years, He put emphasis on depicting the Zen idea through his paintings. His work have been shown in exhibitions in China. Some of his paintings are collected by the local museums.

His most recent oil painting series is With Love and Nectar.

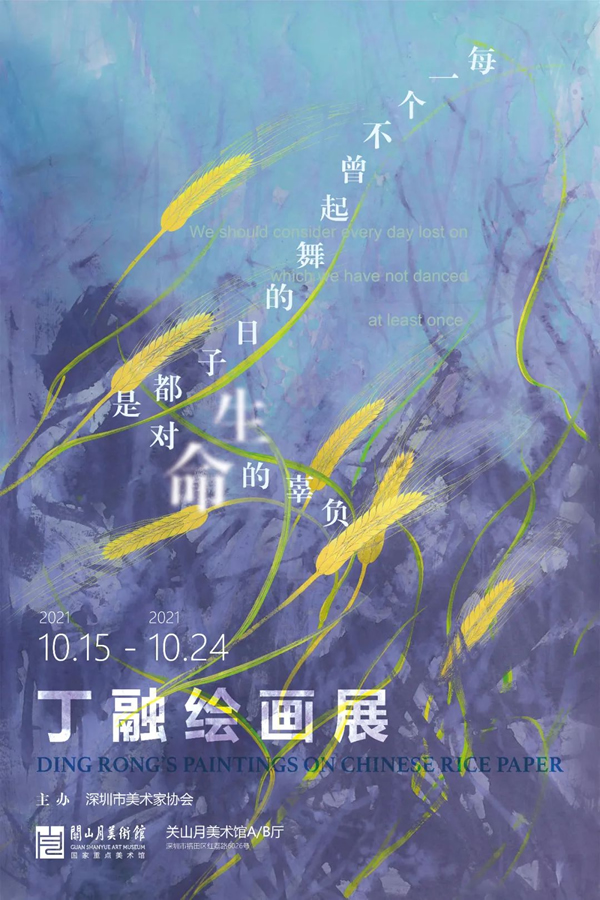
Poster of Rong's solo exhibition – We should consider every day lost on which we have not danced at least once at Guan Shanyue Art Museum in October 2021 in Shenzhen, China.

== Exhibitions ==
- We should consider every day lost on which we have not danced at least once – DING Rong’s Paintings on Chinese Rice Paper, solo painting exhibition at Guan Shanyue Art Museum in October 2021 in Shenzhen, China.
- Azaleas in Full Bloom – DING Rong’s Paintings on Chinese Rice Paper, solo painting exhibition at Jiangxi Art Museum from August to September 2021 in Nanchang, China.
- Growing Colours – DING Rong’s Paintings on Chinese Rice Paper, solo painting exhibition at Qingpu Museum from January to February 2021 in Shanghai, China.
- Treasured and Delicate – DING Rong’s Paintings on Chinese Rice Paper, solo painting exhibition at Shanghai International Commodity Auction Art Center in October 2019 in Shanghai, China.
- Herbaceous Moments – DING Rong’s Paintings on Paper, solo painting exhibition at Shanghai Research Institute of Culture and History in September 2019 in Shanghai, China.
