= Bai Yansong =

Chinese journalist

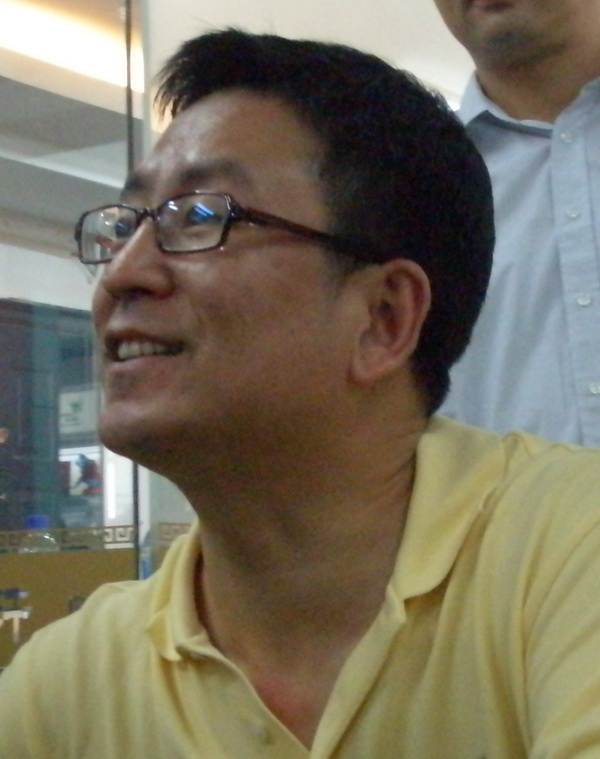
- Bai Yansong at a book-signing in Nanjing.
- Born: August 20, 1968 (age 57); Inner Mongolia, China
- Education: Beijing Broadcasting Institute
- Occupations: Broadcast journalist Author
- Years active: 1989–present
- Relatives: Zhu Hongjun (朱宏钧)

Bai Yansong (Chinese: 白岩松; pinyin: Bái Yánsōng) (born August 20, 1968) is a Chinese news anchor and journalist for China Central Television (CCTV). Bai began his career at the China Broadcasting Newspaper before moving to CCTV, where he hosted programs including Focus Report, Oriental Horizon, and Tell It Like It Is. He was involved in the establishment of news commentary programs such as Timeline and News 1 + 1, the latter of which was the first live news commentary program in China.

== Early life ==
Bai was born in Hulunbuir, Inner Mongolia on August 20, 1968. His parents were intellectuals in Inner Mongolia and his father had been condemned as an "anti-revolutionary" when China was under the leadership of Mao Zedong. Both of Bai's parents were professors and he grew up on the campus of a university during his time in Inner Mongolia. Bai later graduated from the Beijing Broadcasting Institute in 1989.

== Career ==
Bai started his journalistic career working for the China Broadcasting Newspaper of the Central People's Broadcasting Station, but did not consider himself suitable for televised news. He helped found the CCTV program Oriental Horizon and was chosen to be a regular anchor for the show in January 1996, sharing the post with several other journalists. Along with his co-anchors, Bai was seen as politically incisive and his work on Oriental Horizon gained him national notoriety as a television host. He hosted the first talk show in China, Tell It Like It Is alongside Shui Junyi and Cui Yongyuan and other popular news hosts.

He became anchor of Focus Report on China Central Television when it was the only news commentary program in China. During his time as anchor, Bai covered news stories such as the handovers of Hong Kong and Macau, the 50th Anniversary of the People's Republic of China, and the Sydney Olympics, making him one of the most recognizable figures in China. He has also established several news programs on CCTV such as Timeline, modeled after Ted Koppel's Nightline on ABC News. Bai's reporting was the primary subject of a book about Focus Report that was written by the show's producer. News 1 + 1, another news program Bai started, was the first live news commentary program in China.

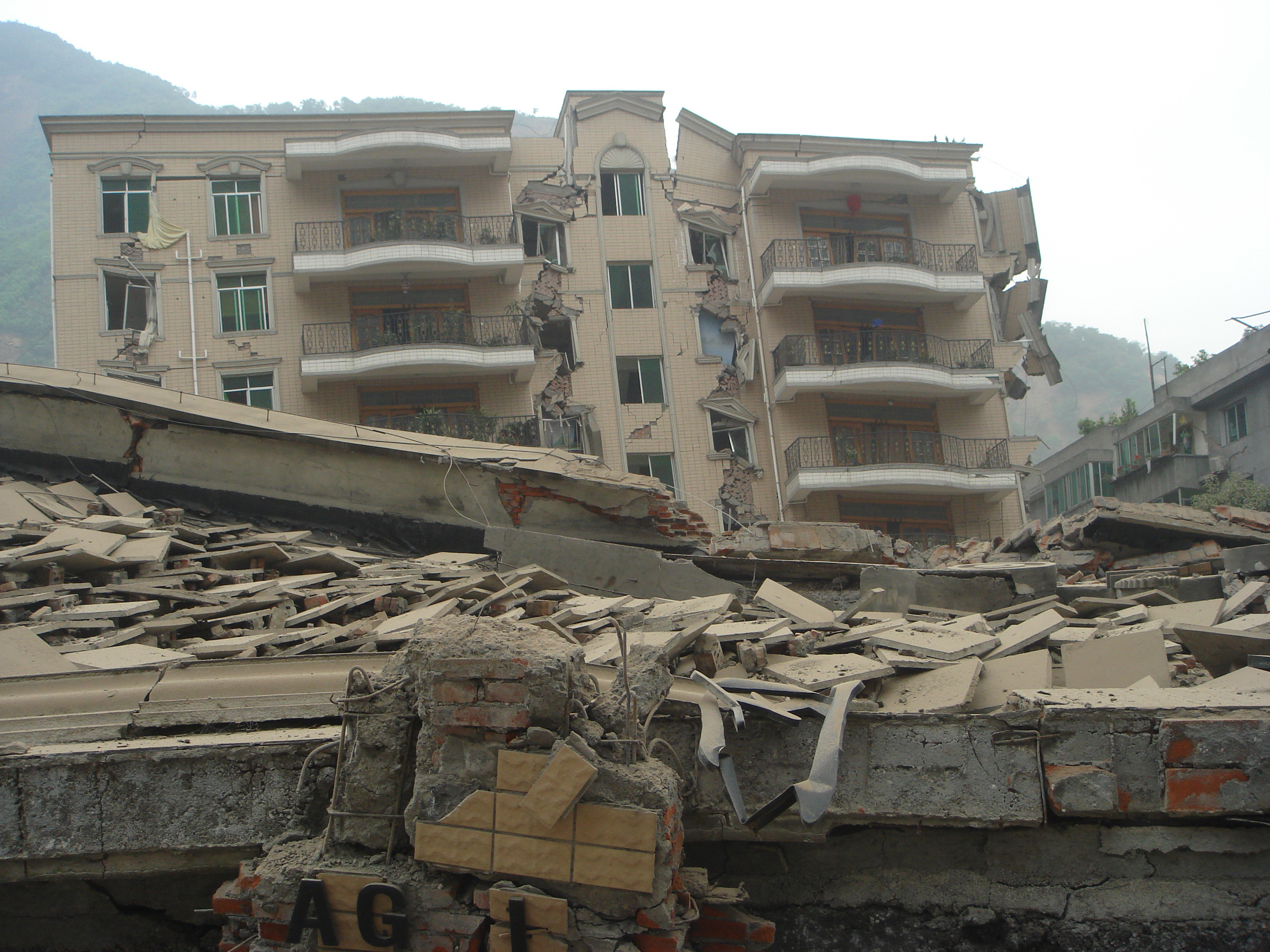
During the 2008 Sichuan earthquake, Bai Yansong was the lead anchor for CCTV.

In the midst of warming ties between China and Japan, Bai filmed a documentary piece for CCTV in 2007 focusing on Japanese culture and the early history of Sino-Japanese relations. He had proposed filming the piece a year before, but says it was considered too sensitive to air until relations improved. Bai later presided over a forum on Sino-Japanese relations, which included ministerial-level officials from Japan and China and discussed issues such as military spending and Tibet.

During the Sichuan earthquake, Bai served as the lead anchor and later noted the significance of open Chinese news coverage of the disaster by stating "this time, it is not a simple live coverage." His reporting on the quake was praised by CCTV editor Xiong Qu for its delivery with Xiong saying Bai "stood the test" as China's lead anchor.

Some of the reporting in Bai's programs has faced opposition from government censors. After a program Bai was going to air on a chemical plant in Dalian was cancelled by censors, Bai commented on his blog to criticize the decision to cancel the piece, which led to his account being blocked. Dong Qian, co-anchor of Bai's News 1 + 1 program, was temporarily taken off the air after Bo Xilai talked to the CCTV president about a piece on the program that highlighted serious concerns regarding the nature of Bo's anticorruption campaign in Chongqing.

== Politics ==
Haiqing Yu has identified Bai as being part of the first generation of Chinese journalists to adopt an outsider's approach to journalism, as opposed to previous generations, who viewed their role as being to prop up the Party and the government. Bai has stated that he tries to use his position in the news media to help instigate political reform and promote democratic ideals in China and supports liberal market reforms of government-run media. He argues that the media is more responsive to public needs when it is subject to market forces, but believes that news reform can only advance alongside political reform. In a commentary for The Beijing News, Bai argued that insuring rationality in government was dependent on moving China further towards the rule of law.

When Tibetan independence supporters disrupting the Olympic torch relay in Paris prompted calls for a boycott of French retailers in China such as Carrefour and Louis Vuitton, Bai went online to oppose a boycott. He encouraged proponents of a boycott to be calm and consider the consequences for Chinese nationals working at the affected retailers.

Bai is also a member of the 21st Century Committee for China-Japan Friendship, a group that consults the two countries on policies concerning their mutual relations. Following a 2008 meeting of the group, he spoke approvingly of a speech by then Japanese Prime Minister Yasuo Fukuda for emphasizing a collective view of their interests stating that "For Sino-Japanese relations, it is no longer the question of 'You' and 'I'. Now we are a community of interests with our feet in Asia and facing the world together." Following anti-Japanese demonstrations over the East China Sea islands dispute, Bai decried acts of violence during the protests as committing crimes under the guise of patriotism.

== Humanitarianism ==
Bai has served as a spokesman for efforts against HIV/AIDS in China. He was named the Image Ambassador for the AIDS Prevention Education Project for Chinese Youth following the project's establishment and served as an ambassador for the China Red Ribbon Foundation. As a CRRF ambassador, Bai attended a gala that the group organized to promote efforts against AIDS on the eve of the 25th World AIDS Day. During the gala, Bai held on-stage interviews with the Chinese Health Minister, the executive director of the CRRF, and the General Manager for the Global Fund.

Following the Sichuan earthquake, Bai hosted a live program together with fellow CCTV hosts in order to raise funds for disaster relief. He also made a show of support for the victims when he was carrying the Olympic torch for the 2008 Olympics relay.

== Bibliography ==
- Painful and Happy (Chinese: 痛并快乐着), (2000).
- Yansong Goes to Taiwan (Chinese: 岩松看台湾), (2005).
- Yansong Goes to Japan (Chinese: 岩松看日本), (2007).
- Yansong Goes to America (Chinese: 岩松看美国), (2009)
- Are You Living Happily Now? (Chinese: 幸福了吗), (2010).
- A Person and This Times (Chinese: 一个人与这个时代), (2013).
- Walking Between Love and Hate (Chinese: 行走在爱与恨之间), (2014).
- Bai Say (Speak in Vain) (Chinese: 白说), (2015).
- Yansong Goes to Taiwan II: Distant History and Close Feelings (Chinese: 岩松看台湾——远的历史近的情), (2016).
- All Things Will Come True (Chinese: 万事尽头，终将如意), (2016).
