= Li Xiaomeng =

Chinese former television host

- 李小萌
- Born: September 20, 1973 (age 52); Beijing, China
- Education: Communication University of China
- Occupation: TV host
- Years active: 1998-2015
- Known for: 24 Hours; News 1+1; News Probe
- Television: China Central Television (CCTV)
- Children: 1
- Awards: Golden Mike Award (2010); Golden Eagle Award for the Most Popular Host

Li Xiaomeng (Chinese: 李小萌; pinyin: Lǐ Xiǎoméng; born 20 September 1973) is a Chinese former television host. She won the Golden Eagle Award for the Most Popular Host in 2008, and the Golden Mike Award in 2010.

== Biography ==
Li was born in Beijing in September 1973. After graduating from Communication University of China in 1996, she joined the China Central Television, hosting 24 Hours, News Probe, and News 1+1.

== Works ==
=== Television ===
- 24 Hours (Chinese: 24小时)
- News 1+1 (Chinese: 新闻1+1)
- News Probe (Chinese: 新闻调查)

== Awards ==
- 2010 Golden Mike Award
- 2008 Golden Eagle Award for the Most Popular Host

== Personal life ==
Li has a daughter, who was born on 13 January 2012.
