= Huang Kezhi =

Chinese physicist (1927–2022)

- 黄克智
- Born: 21 July 1927; Nanchang, Jiangxi, China
- Died: 6 December 2022 (aged 95); Beijing, China
- Education: National Chung Cheng University; Tsinghua University
- Spouse: Chen Peiying
- Children: 3, including Yonggang Huang
- Scientific career
- Fields: Solid mechanics
- Workplaces: Institute of Engineering Mechanics, Tsinghua University

Chinese name
- Simplified Chinese: 黄克智
- Traditional Chinese: 黃克智
Transcriptions
Standard Mandarin
- Hanyu Pinyin: Huáng Kèzhì

Huang Kezhi (Chinese: 黄克智; 21 July 1927 – 6 December 2022) was a Chinese physicist who was a professor at Tsinghua University, and an academician of the Chinese Academy of Sciences. Together with Zhang Wei and Du Qinghua, they are known as "the Three giants of Solid mechanics at Tsinghua University".

== Biography ==
Huang was born in Nanchang, Jiangxi, on 21 July 1927, to Huang Yicheng (黄以诚), a post office clerk, and Gong Shenxiu (龚慎修). His ancestral home is in Fuzhou, Fujian. His great-grandfather Huang Nailin (黄乃麟) was a traditional Chinese medical doctor. His grandfather Huang Xie (黄燮) was teacher. Due to the Second Sino-Japanese War, he successively attended Beitan Primary School (北坛小学), Baihuazhou Primary School (百花洲小学), Tengwangge Primary School (滕王阁小学), Ji'an Yangming Middle School (吉安阳明中学), and Jiangxi Provincial High School (赣省中学). In 1943, he was admitted to National Chung Cheng University, where he studied under the supervision of Cai Fangyin. After graduating in 1947, he became an assistant at Peiyang University. In 1948, he did his postgraduate work at Tsinghua University under the direction of Zhang Wei. In October 1955, he was sent to study at Moscow State University on government scholarships.

In September 1958, Huang was summoned to Tsinghua University for establishing the Department of Engineering Mechanics and Mathematics. In 1966, as the Cultural Revolution broke out, Huang was labeled as a "reactionary academic authority" by the Chinese Communist Party and was sent to the May Seventh Cadre Schools to do farm works in the suburb of Nanchang, Jiangxi. He was promoted to associate professor in 1963 and to full professor in 1978. He was appointed director of the Institute of Engineering Mechanics in 1983.

On 6 December 2022, Huang died of an illness in Beijing, at the age of 95.

== Personal life ==
In 1955, Huang married Chen Peiying (陈佩英), a classmate of Tsinghua University from Zhejiang. The couple had three children: Qiong Huang (黄琼; doctorate from Massachusetts Institute of Technology), Yonggang Huang, and Yongqiang Huang (黄永强; doctorate from Stanford University).

== Honours and awards ==
- 1991 Member of the Chinese Academy of Sciences (CAS)
- 2001 Science and Technology Progress Award of the Ho Leung Ho Lee Foundation
- 2003 Foreign Academician of the Russian Academy of Sciences (RAS)
- 2004 State Natural Science Award (Second Class) for the study on the Theory of Tensor Function Representation and the Invariance of Material Constitutive Equation
- 2005 State Natural Science Award (Second Class) for mechanical and electrical coupling failure and constitutive relation of ferroelectric ceramics
- 2010 State Natural Science Award (Second Class) for deformation and fracture of electromagnetic solids
