= Min Tai =

Chinese novelist and film producer

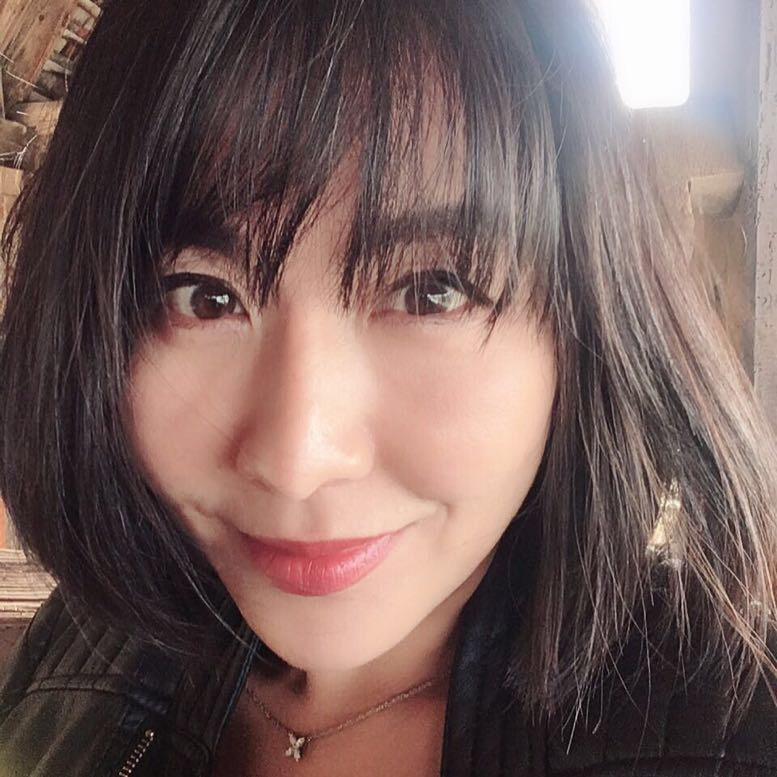
- Born: Shaanxi, China
- Other name: Tammy Tai
- Years active: 2004–present

Min "Tammy" Tai (Chinese: 邰敏; pinyin: Tái Mǐn) is a Chinese novelist and film producer. Born in Shaanxi, China, she is the author of nine Chinese novels including One Night in Beijing [夜北京]. MetroStyle dubbed her the Carrie Bradshaw of China.

== Career ==
Tai is a former model, and was part of the top ten in the 2005 Miss Universe Beijing pageant. She has studied directing and script-writing, and previously worked as an assistant director for the 2013 film Legendary: Tomb of the Dragon. Tai was a producer on the 2019 film Number One (拿摩一等), directed by sixth generation Chinese director Ah Nian.

In 2021, she served on the International Competition Jury at the 37th Warsaw Film Festival. The English translation of her novel One Night in Beijing [夜北京] was published by Paget in November 2021.

In 2022, Tai was the lead actress and producer of a short film based on her novel My Dear Stranger. The film, directed by Melanie Joanne George, received the Best Experimental Film award at the Golden Harvest Film Festival Season 2, and winner of the Film on Women category at the World Film Carnival Singapore (May 2022).
