= Shui Junyi =

Chinese Han journalist (born 1963)

- 水均益
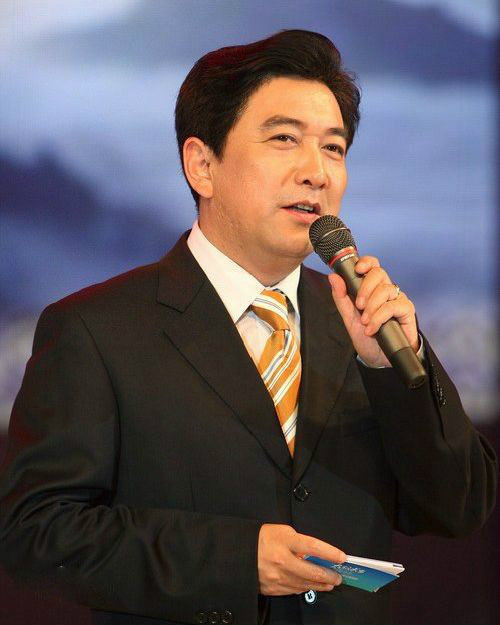
- Shui in 2020
- Born: 20 September 1963 (age 62); Lanzhou, Gansu, China
- Education: Lanzhou University
- Occupations: Journalist; reporter
- Years active: 1984–present
- Known for: Oriental Horizon; The World
- Spouse: Wang Jun (m. 1991–2007) Yang Di (m. 2010)
- Children: 3

Chinese name
- Traditional Chinese: 水均益
- Simplified Chinese: 水均益
Transcriptions
Standard Mandarin
- Hanyu Pinyin: Shuǐ Jūnyì

Shui Junyi (Chinese: 水均益; pinyin: Shuǐ Jūnyì, born 20 September 1963 in Sanjia Jishuijia Village, Gansu) is a Chinese Han journalist.

His grandfather, named Shui Zi (Chinese: 水梓), is a Lanzhou in Gansu Province.

== Early life ==
From 1980 to 1984, he studied English Language and Literature at the Department of Foreign Languages, Lanzhou University. Shui Yishi graduated from the Communication University of China in 2006.

== Career ==
From 1984 to 1993, he worked as an editor and reporter at the International Newsroom of Xinhua News Agency. From 1989 to 1991, he was a correspondent working in Egypt and participated in Gulf War reporting. Xinhua was one of the Chinese domestic mainstream media that reported on.

In 1993, he joined China Central Television and participated in the Oriental Horizon (Chinese: 东方时空) program and was the host of the news commentary Focus Report (Chinese: 焦点访谈).

On 5 February 2003 five people including Shui went to Iraq to report. On March 18, two days before the war began, Shui reported that the group had withdrawn from Baghdad. On March 26, some members of the report group returned for further report.

In 2003, he was named as one of China's top ten outstanding young people.

Shui became the presenter of the news programme The World (Chinese: 环球视线) of China Central Television.

== Personal life ==
Shui's original wife is Wang Jun (Chinese: 王君) with whom he fathered had a daughter, Shui Yishi (Chinese: 水亦诗). Shui's current wife is Yang Di (Chinese: 杨迪), and they have two children.
