= Wang Ning (news anchor) =

Chinese television presenter

- 王宁
- Born: 11 July 1964 (age 62); Qingdao, Shandong, China
- Education: Communication University of China; Renmin University of China
- Occupations: Host, announcer
- Years active: 1983–2017
- Known for: Xinwen Lianbo
- Television: China Central Television (CCTV)
- Spouse: Liu Chunyan
- Children: 1

Wang Ning (simplified Chinese: 王宁; traditional Chinese: 王寧; pinyin: Wáng Níng; born 11 July 1964) is a former Chinese news anchor for China Central Television, the main state announcer of China.

Wang is known all over China as an announcer for the 7:00 pm CCTV News program Xinwen Lianbo, which serves China on various domestic and international networks. It is one of the most watched news programs in the world.

== Biography ==
Wang was born in Qingdao, Shandong in 1964. After graduating from Communication University of China, he was assigned to China Central Television to host Xinwen Lianbo.

== Personal life ==
Wang is married to the actress and host, Liu Chunyan. They have a daughter, Wang Yichen (Chinese: 王逸宸).
