= Hai Xia =

Chinese news anchor

- 海霞
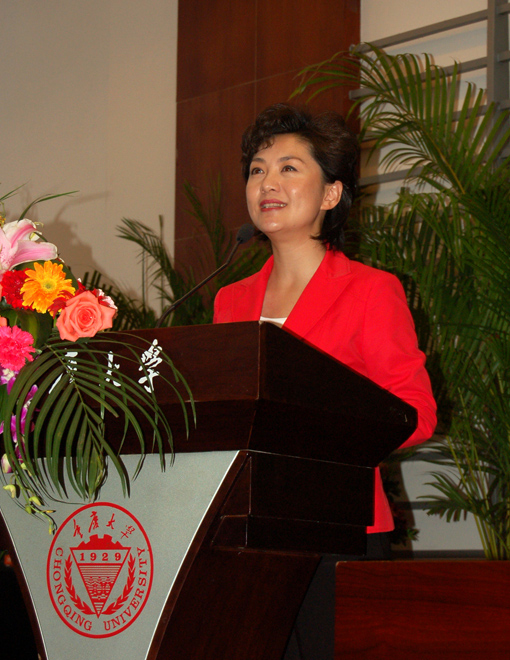
- Hai Xia

Member of the Chinese People's Political Consultative Conference (11th, 12th, 13th)
- Incumbent
- Assumed office March 2008
- Chairman: Jia Qinglin; Yu Zhengsheng; Wang Yang

Personal details
- Born: March 9, 1972 (age 54) Zhengzhou, Henan
- Spouse: Luo Yongzhang
- Education: Communication University of China; Beijing Normal University
- Occupation: Host
- Awards: Golden Mic Award; 2007
- Years active: 1993–present
- Known for: Xinwen Lianbo
- Television: China Central Television (CCTV)

Hai Xia (Chinese: 海霞; pinyin: Hǎi Xiá; born 9 March 1972) is a Chinese news anchor for China Central Television, the main state announcer of China.

She won the Golden Mic Award in 2007.

Hai Xia is known all over China as an announcer for the 7:00 pm CCTV News program Xinwen Lianbo, which has reach all over China on various networks and internationally, is one of the most watched news programs in the world.

== Biography ==
Hai Xia was born in Zhengzhou, Henan in 1972, and she is of the Hui people descent. She studied at Zhengzhou Muslim School.

After graduating from Communication University of China in 1993 she was assigned to China Central Television to host Morning News, Nightly News, and Live News.

Hai Xia hosted Xinwen Lianbo since 2007.

In 2008, she became a member of the 11th National Committee of the Chinese People's Political Consultative Conference.

== Works ==
=== Television ===
- Morning News (Chinese: 早间新闻)
- Nightly News (Chinese: 晚间新闻)
- Live News (Chinese: 现在播报/新闻直播间)
- Xinwen Lianbo (Chinese: 新闻联播)

== Awards ==
- 2007 Golden Mic Award

== Personal life ==
Hai Xia was married to Luo Yongzhang (罗永章), who is a professor at Tsinghua University, their daughter, Luo Luo (罗螺), was born in 2002.
