= Chai Lu =

Chinese television host

- 柴璐
- Born: March 26, 1977 (age 49); Xi'an, Shaanxi, China
- Education: Communication University of China
- Occupation: Host
- Years active: 1999-present
- Known for: Across the Strait
- Television: China Central Television (CCTV)

Chai Lu (Chinese: 柴璐; pinyin: Chái Lù; born 26 March 1977) is a Chinese host for China Central Television.

== Biography ==
Chai Lu was born in Xi'an, Shaanxi, in March 1977. She completed her primary education at Xi'an No.2 School.

She entered Communication University of China in 1995, majoring in broadcast, where she graduated in 1999. She received her MPA degree from Tsinghua University in 2005, majoring in public management.

Chai Lu joined China Central Television in 1998. She hosted Across the Strait between 1999 and 2007, and also hosted Midnight News, Live News, World Express, and News 30 Minutes.

== Works ==
=== Television ===
- Across the Strait (Chinese: 海峡两岸)
- Midnight News (Chinese: 午夜新闻)
- Live News (Chinese: 新闻直播间)
- World Express (Chinese: 国际时讯)
- News 30 Minutes (Chinese: 新闻30分)
