= Luo Jing =

Chinese television presenter

- 罗京
- Born: May 29, 1961; Chaoyang District, Beijing, China
- Died: June 5, 2009 (aged 48); Beijing, China
- Education: Communication University of China
- Occupation: News anchor
- Years active: 1983–2008
- Known for: Xinwen Lianbo
- Television: China Central Television (CCTV)
- Political party: Chinese Communist Party
- Spouse: Liu Jihong
- Children: Luo Shutong (son)

Luo Jing (simplified Chinese: 罗京; traditional Chinese: 羅京; pinyin: Luó Jīng; May 29, 1961 – June 5, 2009) was a prominent news anchor for China Central Television (CCTV), the main state broadcaster of the People's Republic of China. He was known all over China as an announcer for the 7:00 pm CCTV News program Xinwen Lianbo. As one of China's most well-known TV personalities, Luo's voice was very distinctive amongst Chinese news announcers. During his career he was known for his professionalism and "impeccable etiquette".

== Career ==
He began working for China Central Television in 1983, after he graduated from the Communication University of China. For 20 years he co-anchored the network's prime time news program Xinwen Lianbo. The program, which has reach all over China on various networks and internationally, is one of the most watched news programs in the world. Throughout his tenure, Luo, often alongside his colleague Xing Zhibin, was the news frontman of China's state-owned network for all of the nation's pivotal events since the 1980s, covering the 1989 Tiananmen Square protests and massacre, the death of Chinese leader Deng Xiaoping in 1997, and the Chinese government's decision to crack down on Falun Gong in 1999, as well as the return of Macau to Chinese sovereignty in the same year. Luo also accompanied dignitaries, notably chinese leaders Jiang Zemin and Hu Jintao, on their official visits to foreign countries to do reporting on location.

From 2004–08, Luo Jing was awarded Best News Anchor of CCTV for five consecutive years. Luo was active in politics, as a delegate of the 17th National Congress of the Chinese Communist Party, held in Beijing in late 2007. He was also a torch bearer for the 2008 Beijing Olympics.

His last broadcast for Xinwen Lianbo was on August 31, 2008, when he covered the funeral of former Chinese leader Hua Guofeng.

== Death ==
Luo died of lymphoma on June 5, 2009, at the age of 48. CCTV Xinwen Lianbo, the most important news programme in China and also the programme Luo Jing had worked for 25 years, reported Luo Jing's death on June 11, 2009.

== Personal life ==
Off camera, Luo was engaged in activities such as Peking Opera and was an amateur football player. His parents are from Sichuan Province, and Luo himself, although born in Beijing, spoke the Sichuan dialect. Luo married his classmate Liu Jihong (Chinese: 刘继红) in 1988. They have one son, who was born in 1995, Shutong Luo.
