= Xue Fei =

Xue Fei is the name of:

- Xue Fei (host) (born 1960s?), Chinese TV host and educator
- Xue Fei (footballer) (born 1987), Chinese association footballer
- Xue Fei (runner) (born 1989), Chinese long-distance runner
