= Zhang Hongmin =

Chinese news anchor

- 张宏民
- Born: 13 March 1961 (age 65); Beijing, China
- Education: Communication University of China
- Occupation: News presenter
- Years active: 1982–present
- Known for: Xinwen Lianbo
- Television: China Central Television (CCTV)
- Political party: Chinese Communist Party
- Awards: Golden Mike Award; 2009

Zhang Hongmin (simplified Chinese: 张宏民; traditional Chinese: 張宏民; pinyin: Zhāng Hóngmín; born 13 March 1961) is a Chinese news presenter for China Central Television (CCTV), the main state announcer of China. He won the Golden Mic Award in 2009.

He is known in China as an announcer for the 7:00 pm CCTV news program Xinwen Lianbo, shown all over China on various networks and internationally, which is one of the most watched news programs in the world.

== Biography ==
Zhang was born in Beijing in March 1961, with his ancestral home in Tang County, Hebei. After graduating from the Communication University of China in 1982 he was assigned to China Central Television to host Xinwen Lianbo.

On June 4, 1989, he and Du Xian reported that the People's Liberation Army had cleared thousands of protesting students from Tian'anmen Square. Du Xian was forced to resign for expressing sympathy, but Zhang Hongmin was released.

== Works ==
=== Television ===
- Xinwen Lianbo (Chinese: 新闻联播)

== Awards ==
- 2009 Golden Mic Award.
