= A Date with Luyu =

- 鲁豫有约
- Genre: Talk show
- Created by: Chen Luyu
- Presented by: Chen Luyu
- Starring: Chen Luyu
- Narrated by: Chen Luyu
- Country of origin: China
- Original languages: Mandarin; English

Production
- Production location: Beijing
- Camera setup: Multiple
- Running time: 45 minutes
- Production company: Phoenix New Media Inc.

Original release
- Network: PHTV, HBS, AHTV
- Release: 1998 – present

Related
- The Oprah Winfrey Show

A Date With Luyu (also spelled A Date With Lu Yu) (simplified Chinese: 鲁豫有约; traditional Chinese: 魯豫有約; pinyin: Lǔyù Yǒu Yuē) is a popular Chinese television talk show that airs on Phoenix Television. Because the show emulates the success and format of The Oprah Winfrey Show, its host and creator, Chen Luyu, has been called "China's Oprah". The show includes a studio audience of about 300. The show covers a wide range of issues: interviewees range from artists and musicians such as Li Yundi, business leaders such as Robin Li, diplomatic figures such as US ambassador to China Gary Locke, academics such as Prof Michael Dobson and sports figures such as Shane Battier. She is also willing to address controversial subjects.

It is noted that some interviews are conducted in English, with Chinese subtitles, as was the cases when Lu Yu interviewed Wentworth Miller, Nick Vujicic, and Hillary Clinton with Timothy Geithner. Audience members are required to understand English in these instances, because Lu Yu has warned about problems with interviews being done entirely in a single language, i.e. Mandarin Chinese.

Luyu averages 140 million viewers per show.
