= Dong Hao =

- 董浩
- Born: 1956 (age 69–70); Beijing, China
- Other name: Uncle Dong Hao (董浩叔叔)
- Education: Capital Normal University
- Occupations: Host, actor, painter
- Years active: 1977–2016
- Known for: Big Pinwheel
- Television: China Central Television (CCTV)
- Spouse: Zhang Wei
- Children: 1
- Parent: Father: Dong Jingshan
- Awards: Golden Mike Award; 2009; Flying Apsaras Award; 1987 Office Romance

Dong Hao (Chinese: 董浩; pinyin: Dǒng Hào; born 1956) better known by his nickname Uncle Dong Hao (Chinese: 董浩叔叔; pinyin: Dǒng Hào Shūshū), is a former Chinese television host, voice actor and painter.

He won the Golden Mike Award in 2009, and received the Flying Apsaras Award in 1987.

== Biography ==
Dong was born in Beijing in 1956, with his ancestral home in Fengrun village of Tangshan city, the son of Dong Jingshan (董静山), a Chinese calligrapher. At the age of four, his father died of myocardial infarction. He graduated from Capital Normal University.

Dong joined the Beijing People's Broadcasting Corporation, and was initially famous for being the voice actor of Mickey Mouse in the Chinese dub of the Disney cartoon. He was transferred to China Central Television in 1990, and hosted the children's television program Between Heaven and Earth (天地之间), Tangram (七巧板) and Big Pinwheel until the role was taken over by He Jiong and Liu Chunyan during the mid-1990s.

On January 7, 2016, Dong Hao announced he is retired in Weibo.

== Works ==
=== Television ===
- Big Pinwheel (Chinese: 大风车)
- Fuwa (Chinese: 福娃)

=== Film ===
- Secret Plans (2014)

== Awards ==
- 1987 Flying Apsaras Award - Office Romance
- 2009 Golden Mike Award

== Personal life ==
Dong married Zhang Wei (张微), the couple has a daughter, Dong Xiaoxiao (董笑笑).
