= Gang Qiang =

Chinese news anchor (born 1976)

- 刚强
- Born: 7 April 1976 (age 49); Taiyuan, Shanxi, China
- Education: Beijing Broadcasting Institute
- Occupation: Anchor
- Years active: 2000 - present
- Known for: Xinwen Lianbo
- Television: China Central Television
- Spouse: Chun Ni
- Children: 1

Chinese name
- Traditional Chinese: 剛強
- Simplified Chinese: 刚强
Transcriptions
Standard Mandarin
- Hanyu Pinyin: Gāng Qiáng

Gang Qiang (simplified Chinese: 刚强; traditional Chinese: 剛強; pinyin: Gāng Qiáng, born 7 April 1976 in Taiyuan, Shanxi) is an anchor for China Central Television.

== Biography ==
From 1993 to 1996, Gang studied at Taiyuan Experimental High School (formerly Railway No. 1 Middle School).

From 1996 to 2000, he studied at the Beijing Broadcasting Institute (China Communication University).

From 2000 to 2017, he worked at CCTV News Center. He previously served as the anchor of CCTV-4 China News and then transferred to the Xinwen Lianbo behind the scenes.

On the opening day of the 2008 Beijing Olympic Games, Gang passed the torch as the No. 80 torchbearer.

On the evening of January 21, 2017, Gang Qiang became the anchor of Xinwen Lianbo.

Previously, Gang had been a reporter for the Chinese leader's foreign visit.

In 2017, he dubbed the political documentary Take Reforms to the End and in 2018, he dubbed the political documentary The Road to Be, which are the 40th anniversary of reform and opening up.

== Personal life ==
Gang has married the host of Beijing Media Network Xu Chunni (徐春妮); they have one child.
