= Secret Plans =

- Directed by: He Cheng
- Production companies: Zhong Yang Television Station Yang Shi Dong Hua Co., LTD
- Release date: September 26, 2014
- Running time: 87 minutes
- Country: China
- Language: Mandarin
- Box office: ¥12 million (China)

Secret Plans (Chinese: 新大头儿子和小头爸爸之秘密计划) is a 2014 Chinese animated film directed by He Cheng. It was released on September 26, 2014.

== Voice cast ==
- Liu Chunyan
- Dong Hao
- Ju Ping
- Hong Guoguo
- Lü Paopao
- Maomao Chong

== Plot ==
The movie follows the characters of the cartoon Big-Headed Kid and Small-Headed Father, telling the happiness and warmth of their family.

== Reception ==
By September 28, it had earned ¥12 million at the Chinese box office.
