= Xinwen Lianbo =

Chinese state-broadcast television news program

- Opening titles use Chinese characters and pinyin. The show's opening sequence and theme music, first introduced in 1988, has remained mostly unchanged
- Traditional Chinese: 新聞聯播
- Simplified Chinese: 新闻联播
- Genre: News
- Theme music composer: Meng Weidong
- Ending theme: Together Again by Alastair Gavin
- Country of origin: China
- Original language: Mandarin

Production
- Production company: China Central Television

Original release
- Release: 1 January 1978 – present

Xinwen Lianbo (simplified Chinese: 新闻联播; traditional Chinese: 新聞聯播; pinyin: Xīnwén Liánbō; lit. 'News Simulcast') is the flagship daily news programme for state broadcaster China Central Television (CCTV), aired live on CCTV-1 and CCTV-13 daily at 7:00 PM. By custom, it is also simulcast on the flagship channel of each provincial satellite TV station in mainland China, making it one of the world's most-watched programmes. Since its debut on 1 January 1978, the programme has been a primary medium for Chinese government announcements and Communist Party positions.

== Name, format and distribution ==
There is no standard English translation of the name. Variants in use include "Evening News" and "Network News Broadcast". "News Simulcast" is the literal translation, referring to the fact that material is broadcast by all provincial and municipal television stations (usually their flagship channel) in China, which guarantee that audience could watch the programme by Terrestrial television all over the country. And all the provincial TV stations have correspondents and reporters that are obliged to provide the programme with news reports and features from their respective areas.

The program has also been translated into minority languages, such as the Korean version broadcast in the Yanbian Korean Autonomous Prefecture, which was previously called "Domestic and Foreign News" (Korean: 국내외뉴스; Hanja: 國內外뉴스).

The programme consists of a daily news bulletin of approximately thirty minutes, beginning with the headlines and proceeding to detailed reports. In special circumstances, the broadcast is extended beyond the 30 minutes allotted when deemed necessary. For example, in 1997, the death of Deng Xiaoping extended Xinwen Lianbo broadcast beyond the regular time for over a week. The announcers are shown seated, with a window into the control room behind them. The format has hardly varied for three decades, even its details. Mandarin language is always used, in accordance with government language policies, and throughout the broadcast the language is formal and flowery. The delivery is stilted, without happy talk or humour.

Prior to January 2013, Xinwen Lianbo never included "two-way" (where the anchor conducts direct dialogue with a reporter or a commentator) or live reports (although it did air live reports of the launch of the Chang'e 2 lunar satellite on 1 October 2010). The first live report was made on 26 January 2013. They have implemented only Vizrt-powered graphics since the 25 September 2011 newscast. As of 2020, the opening titles and music had been substantially unchanged since 1988.

The programme justifies its title with a comprehensive distribution system that has led the Washington Post to dub it "one of the world's most-watched news programs." Calculations based on official statistics suggest as many as 135 million people tune in each day, which makes sense if one considers the large number people who live in China. The Wall Street Journal calculated in 2006 that it had fourteen times the audience of the highest-rated US news show. The initial 19:00 UTC+8 broadcast is broadcast simultaneously on CCTV-1, CCTV-7 and CCTV-13 (simulcast on CCTV) and on the primary channel of provincial and municipal stations, as well as selected radio stations across the country. CCTV-13 usually repeats the programme (or live if the first broadcast is outdated or contains errors) at 9:00 pm, whereas CCTV-4 usually repeats the programme at a later time and CCTV-1 usually repeats the programme at 5:00 am. There are later repeats dubbed into selected minority languages for viewers in appropriate regions. This ensures that free-to-air and pay TV viewers in the country may see around half the available channels carrying the programme.

On 18 July 2020, Xinwen Lianbo transitioned to 16:9 high definition format.

== History ==
=== Pre-broadcast ===
On 1 May 1958, China's first television station, Beijing Television, began to broadcast the "News Bulletin" from 18:50 to 19:00 every Sunday night, covering major domestic political news, social dynamics, and reports on advanced figures, which was regarded as the prototype of the "News Network" in the future.

On 29 March 1976, the National Conference of Television Journalists held in Beijing proposed to "concentrate the strength of national television stations and create national news television broadcast programs". On 1 July 1976, Beijing Television broadcast the "National Television News Network" for the first time, transmitting signals to more than 10 provincial-level television stations along the microwave trunk line.

== Presenters ==
It is always presented by two news presenters, usually one male and one female. From 1989 to 2006, the main newscasters were Xing Zhibin and Luo Jing, assisted by four others. On 5 June 2006, two younger newscasters, Li Zimeng and Kang Hui, were introduced.

=== Current ===
- Pan Tao (male, 潘涛)
- Yan Yuxin (male, 嚴於信/严於信)
- Wang Yinqi (female, 王音棋)

=== Former ===
- Bao Xiaofeng (female, 寶曉峰/宝晓峰)
- Du Xian (female, 杜憲/杜宪) Removed after expressing sadness to the 1989 Tiananmen Square protest.
- Gang Qiang (male, 剛強/刚强)
- Guo Zhijian (male, 郭志堅/郭志坚)
- Hai Xia (female, 海霞)
- Kang Hui (male, 康輝/康辉)
- Lang Yongchun (male, 郎永淳)
- Li Ruiying (female, 李瑞英)
- Li Xiuping (female, 李修平)
- Li Zimeng (female, 李梓萌)
- Luo Jing (male, 羅京/罗京), deceased
- Ouyang Xiadan (female, 歐陽夏丹/欧阳夏丹)
- Xing Zhibin (female, 邢質斌/邢质斌)
- Xue Fei (male, 薛飛/薛飞) Removed after expressing sadness to the 1989 Tiananmen Square protest.
- Wang Ning (male, 王寧/王宁)
- Zhang Hongmin (male, 張宏民/张宏民)
- Zheng Li (female, 鄭麗/郑丽)

== Political significance ==
=== News values ===
What is the judgement for important news in the minds of many Chinese journalists working for the official media or for propaganda journalism today? Xu Zhaorong, a reporter of Xinhua makes the following 14 observations (Symposium of Journalism 1998):

- 1. Important activities, personnel changes and meetings of the party and the state, such as the banquets of the National Day, meetings of Party and the national People's Congress;
- 2. The activities of party and state leaders, such as their inspection tours, their meetings with foreign guests, their meetings with home delegates, the departures and arrival of their visits abroad and the tea parties hosted by them;
- 3. Important policies, guidelines, laws, rule, regulations and documents of the party and the state;
- 4. Important commentaries on important events and policies...

— Li Xiguang

Effectively, Xinwen Lianbo is a mouthpiece for the party and the state. As with all news broadcasts in mainland China, the running order is dictated by the socio-political importance of the individual or group concerned (rather than other news values). Therefore, the activities of the General Secretary of the Chinese Communist Party are almost always the first item, followed by reports on the members of the Politburo Standing Committee in rank order. Diplomatic engagements are usually shown before domestic engagements. Significant statements from the Central People's Government or the Chinese Communist Party have been read out, in full, after the headlines. When significant events or speeches are covered, the camera will carefully pan across the Politburo Standing Committee.

The program has been heavily criticized for its formulaic presentation of news items and its heavy focus on party and state leaders, and its lack of critical focus. Around half of the programming on average is dedicated to political content: party announcements, government meetings, or leaders' activities.

=== News orientation ===
The programme plays a role in the CCP's communication mechanisms at both the mass and élite levels. Zhan Jiang, professor at China Youth University for Political Sciences, aptly summed up its content in three phrases: "The leaders are busy, the motherland is developing rapidly, other countries are in chaos."

On the one hand, it is the news source with the widest reach amongst China's large population, and so it provides the Party with the opportunity to influence the masses. According to Li, watching the bulletin has traditionally been "a national ritual at the family dinner table."

On the other hand, it has been used as a mechanism to signal changes and continuities in policy and personnel. New policies have been introduced by special features, such as the 'model cadre' used to promote Three Represents in 2002. The ranked shots of the Politburo Standing Committee indicate their relative power: "Each leader is allocated a certain number of seconds in front of the camera, Chinese media experts say, with the time for each one carefully regulated by the party propaganda department." This lies behind the programme's extreme formality, because any miscommunication could have serious consequences.

An example of this, the coverage of the 1989 Tiananmen Square protests and massacre saw longtime anchors Du Xian and Xue Fei fired after they both "wore black and read the news more slowly than usual".

== Overview ==
=== Broadcast time ===
All times are (UTC+08:00).

==== Live ====
- CCTV-1 (free-to-air channel), CCTV-13 (news channel) and CCTV-7 (national defense and military channel): Daily at 19:00-19:30 CST a subsidiary of China Central Television.

==== China Central Television rerun ====
- CCTV-4 (international channel): Daily at 22:30-23:00, Next day at 02:00-02:30 (Asia), 03:00-03:30 (Europe), 05:30-06:00 (America) CST.
- CCTV-13: Daily at 21:00-21:30 CST.
- CCTV-1 (free-to-air channel): Next day at 05:00-05:30 CST.

==== International-language version ====
- Japan:
  - CCTV-Daifu with Japanese version: Daily at 20:00-20:30 JST (19:00-19:30 CST).

== Controversies ==
=== "Very erotic very violent" ===
On 27 December 2007, Xinwen Lianbo aired a report about the wide and easy availability of explicit content on the internet. The report appealed to juristic institutions and government to hurry to make relevant legislation in order to purify the internet environment. In the report, a young student described a pop-up advertisement she saw as being "very erotic very violent". After the airing of the report, many parodies were posted by internet users ridiculing the comment and CCTV's credibility in part. The incident also questioned the reliability of Xinwen Lianbo, noting the unlikelihood of a web page being both violent and erotic at the same time (even though such pages do exist), and the age of the student interviewed. Personal information of the interviewed girl was later also leaked, identifying the girl in the report by name. Online message boards were populated by large threads about the incident, and a satirical work even stated that CCTV's website was the number one "very erotic very violent" website on the internet, with some users even creating their own toplists of sites which meet these criteria, the "top 8 very erotic very violent sports events" and even identifying things that are yellow as being erotic (since 黄, huáng, the Mandarin character for "yellow", also means "erotic").

=== Chengdu J-10 footage ===
On 23 January 2011, the program showcased the Chengdu J-10 in the air by firing a missile at an airplane, the target plane then exploded. This footage lasted half a second, and the destroyed airplane shown was identified as that of an F-5E, a US fighter jet. It turns out the clip was taken from the 1986 US film Top Gun.

== Similar newscasts in other socialist countries ==
- Aktuelle Kamera, Deutscher Fernsehfunk, East Germany
- Bodo (보도), Korean Central Television, North Korea
- Thời sự, Vietnam Television, Vietnam
- Vremya (Russian: Время), Soviet Central Television, Soviet Union
- Dnevnik, Yugoslav Radio Television, Yugoslavia
- Noticiero Nacional de Televisión, Cubavisión, Cuba
- Dziennik Telewizyjny, Telewizja Polska, Poland
- Híradó, Magyar Televízió, Hungary
- Televizní Noviny, Czechoslovak Television, Czechoslovakia
- Telejurnal, Televiziunea Română, Romania
- Revista Televizive, RTSH, Albania
- Po sveta i u nas (Bulgarian: По света и у нас), Bulgarian National Television, Bulgaria
- Telejornal, Televisão Pública de Angola, Televisão de Moçambique, Angola and Mozambique
- Noticiero Sandinista, Canal 6 (Nicaragua), Nicaragua
