= Kang Hui (news anchor) =

Chinese news reader

- 康辉
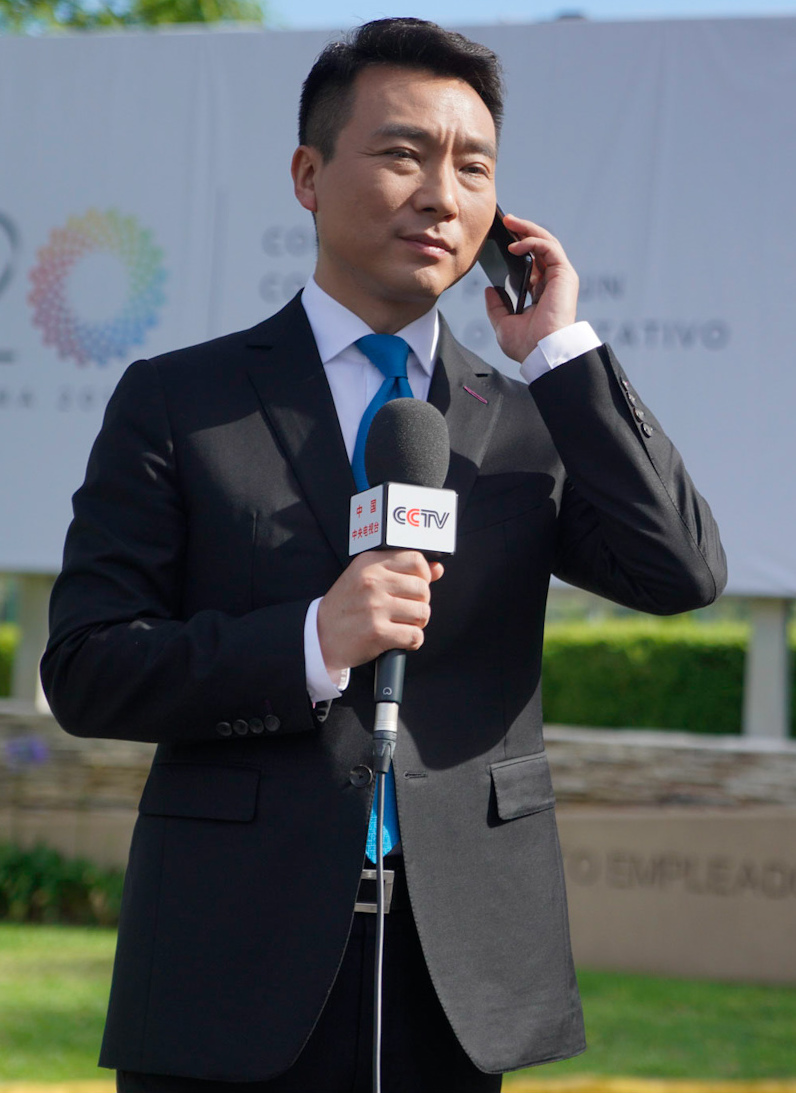
- Kang in 2018
- Born: 17 January 1972 (age 54); Wuji County, Shijiazhuang, Hebei
- Education: Communication University of China; Peking University; Tsinghua University
- Occupations: Anchor, professor
- Years active: 1992–present
- Known for: Xinwen Lianbo
- Television: China Central Television (CCTV)
- Spouse: Liu Yajie (m. 2000)
- Awards: Golden Mike Award; 2008

Kang Hui (simplified Chinese: 康辉; traditional Chinese: 康輝; pinyin: Kāng Huī; born 17 January 1972) is a Chinese news anchor for China Central Television, the main state announcer of China. He is now the President of the Broadcast, China Central Television.

He won the Golden Mike Award in 2008.

He is known all over China as an announcer for the 7:00 pm CCTV News program Xinwen Lianbo, which has reach all over China on various networks and internationally, and is one of the most watched news programs in the world.

== Biography ==
Kang Hui was born in Wuji County, Hebei in January 1972, and grew up in Shijiazhuang. He graduated from Shijiazhuang No.40 Middle School and the Secondary School attached to Hebei Normal University.

After graduating from Communication University of China on 23 November 1992 he was assigned to China Central Television to be a host. He hosted Xinwen Lianbo since December 8, 2007.

On December 22, 2007, Kang Hui was employed as a professor at Guangxi University for Nationalities.

Beginning in 2015, Kang became a host on the CCTV New Year's Gala. He is the first Xinwen Lianbo announcer to also host the lunar new year celebration since Zhao Zhongxiang.

== Works ==
=== Television ===
- Xinwen Lianbo
- World Weekly
- Live News
- News 30'
- Nightly News

== Awards ==
- 2008 Golden Mike Award

== Personal life ==
Kang married his school friend Liu Yajie (刘雅洁) in Beijing in 2000.
