= Guo Zhijian =

- 郭志坚
- Born: July 21, 1971 (age 55); Xuanhua County, Zhangjiakou, Hebei, China
- Education: Communication University of China
- Years active: 1998-present
- Known for: Xinwen Lianbo
- Television: China Central Television (CCTV)
- Children: 1

Chinese name
- Traditional Chinese: 郭志堅
- Simplified Chinese: 郭志坚
Transcriptions
Standard Mandarin
- Hanyu Pinyin: Guō Zhìjiān

Guo Zhijian (born 21 July 1971) is a Chinese news anchor for China Central Television, the main state announcer of China.

Guo is known all over China as an announcer for the 7:00 pm CCTV News program Xinwen Lianbo, which has reach all over China on various networks and internationally, is one of the most watched news programs in the world.

== Biography ==
Guo was born in Xuanhua County, Zhangjiakou, Hebei in July 1971.

He entered Communication University of China in 1992, majoring in Broadcasting, after graduating he was assigned to Beijing Television to be a host.

Guo was transferred to China Central Television in 1998, and he hosted Xinwen Lianbo since 2007.

== Works ==
=== Television ===
- Xinwen Lianbo

== Personal life ==
Guo has a son, Guo Tianyue (Chinese: 郭天悦).
