= Ju Ping =

Chinese television host

- 鞠萍
- Born: 25 January 1966 (age 60); Beijing, China
- Other names: Sister Ju Ping (鞠萍姐姐); Aunt Ju Ping (鞠萍阿姨)
- Education: Beijing Children Normal Training School
- Years active: 1984–present
- Known for: Jigsaw Puzzle
- Television: China Central Television (CCTV)
- Political party: Chinese Communist Party
- Spouse: Yang Shuo
- Children: 1
- Awards: Golden Mike Award; 1993; Golden Mike Award; 1995

Ju Ping (Chinese: 鞠萍; pinyin: Jū Píng; born 25 January 1966) is a Chinese child program host. She won China's Golden Mike Award in 1993 and 1995.

Ju Ping is the first host from China to host youth programs.

== Biography ==
Ju Ping was born in a highly educated family in Beijing in January 1966, with her ancestral home in Rongcheng, Weihai, Shandong. She has an elder brother.

In 1966, during the Cultural Revolution launched by Mao Zedong, her parent was sent to the May Seventh Cadre Schools to work in Zhengyang County, Henan.

After the Cultural Revolution, her family returned to Beijing.

Ju Ping studied at Beijing National Day School for her elementary education. She graduated from Beijing Children Normal Training School in 1984. After graduation, she joined China Central Television where she hosted Jigsaw Puzzle between 1 June 1985 to 31 May 1995.

Ju Ping joined the Chinese Communist Party in November 1998.

In November 2002, she was appointed Vice-President of the China Association of Radio and Television.

== Works ==
=== Television ===
- Jigsaw Puzzle (Chinese: 七巧板)

=== Film ===
- Secret Plans (2014)
- The King of Tibetan Antelope (2015)

== Awards ==
- 1993 Golden Mike Award
- 1995 Golden Mike Award

== Personal life ==
Ju Ping has a son with her former husband, Jiang Yiyao (蒋翼遥). Her son was born on 22 January 1993. Her current husband is Yang Shuo (杨硕).
