= Du Qinghua =

Chinese physicist (1919–2006)

- Born: April 14, 1919; Hangzhou, Zhejiang Province, Republic of China
- Died: November 5, 2006 (aged 87); Beijing, China
- Education: Harvard School of Engineering and Applied Sciences; Stanford University; Zhejiang University
- Scientific career
- Fields: Physics
- Workplaces: Peking University; Shanghai Jiao Tong University; Tsinghua University

Du Qinghua (simplified Chinese: 杜庆华; traditional Chinese: 杜慶華; pinyin: Dù Qìnghuá; April 14, 1919 – 2006), also known as Q.H. DU, was a Chinese physicist. He was a pioneer of aeronautic and astronautic material engineering in China. and a member of the Chinese Academy of Engineering.

== Life ==
On April 14, 1919, Du was born in Hangzhou, Zhejiang Province. in the 1930s, Du studied in Hangzhou Middle School. In 1936, he graduated from Hangzhou High School. In 1937, Du studied at Zhejiang University. In 1940, he graduated from the Department of Mechanics, National Chiao Tung University (now Shanghai Jiao Tong University).

In 1947, Du went to study in the United States. He entered Stanford University and majored in solid state physics. In June 1948, Du obtained a master's degree of aeronautic engineering from Stanford. In September 1948, Du turned to Harvard University and studied hydrodynamics under the academic advice of Richard von Mises. In June 1949, Du earned another master of aeronautics from Harvard. In September 1949, Du went back to Stanford and did research on aeronautic light structure with Stephen Timoshenko and Goodier. He received his doctorate in April 1951.

In June 1951, Du went back to China and taught at Peking University. In 1952, Du was transferred to Tsinghua University and became a teaching and research leader of mechanics. In 1958, Du was one of the founders of the Department of Engineering Mechanics of Tsinghua University. From 1983 to 1987, Du was also a part-time professor at Shanghai Jiao Tong University, Xi'an Jiao Tong University, and Zhejiang University, and he was an honorary professor at Nanjing University of Aeronautics and Astronautics.

Du was a founder of Chinese modern aeronautic and astronautic material engineering. He was also a founder of the teaching and research of mechanics and material engineering at Tsinghua University. In 1997, Du was elected academician of the Chinese Academy of Engineering (CAE).

== Works ==
Du wrote more than 130 papers and also several popular textbooks and handbooks, including:

- Material Mechanics (《材料力学》)
- Theory for Elasticity (《弹性理论》)
- Handbook for Engineering Mechanics (《工程力学手册》)

== Family ==
Du's daughter Du Xian is a former news anchor of China Central Television and the wife of actor Chen Daoming.
