= Nanjing University of Chinese Medicine =

Provincial public university in Nanjing, Jiangsu, China

Coordinates: 32°06′18.98″N 118°56′24.30″E

- 南京中医药大学
- Type: Public
- Established: 1954; 72 years ago
- President: Qiao Xuebin (乔学斌)
- Students: around 20,000
- Location: Nanjing, Jiangsu, China
- Website: english.njucm.edu.cn

Nanjing University of Chinese Medicine
- Simplified Chinese: 南京中医药大学
- Traditional Chinese: 南京中醫藥大學
Transcriptions
Standard Mandarin
- Hanyu Pinyin: Nánjīng Zhōng Yīyào Dàxué

The Nanjing University of Chinese Medicine (NJUCM; 南京中医药大学) is a provincial public university in Nanjing, Jiangsu, China. It is affiliated with the Province of Jiangsu. The university is part of the Double First-Class Construction.

Established in 1954, NJUCM is one of the earliest established universities of Traditional Chinese Medicine in China, and 1st rank in Traditional Chinese Medicine university in China dedicated to the study of traditional Chinese medicine. The university has three campuses, Xianlin, Hanzhongmen and TaiZhou, currently (as of 2018) it has nearly 20,000 enrolled students, including a number of international students. The school offers 33 undergraduate programs, 7 master programs, and 4 doctoral degree programs.

== History ==
NJUCM is established in 1954, which is one of the earliest established universities of Traditional Chinese Medicine in China. The name of the university was changed to Nanjing University of Chinese Medicine in 1995, former names of which are Jiangsu Traditional Training School(Chinese: 江苏省中医进修学校; pinyin: Jiāngsū Shěng Zhōngyī Jìnxiū Xuéxiào), Jiangsu Provincial School of Traditional Chinese Medicine (Chinese: 江苏省中医学校; pinyin: Jiāngsū Shěng Zhōngyī Xuéxiào), the Branch Library of Jiangsu New Medical College (Chinese: 江苏新医学院; pinyin: Jiāngsū Xīnyī Xuéyuàn), Nanjing Traditional Chinese Medicine College (Chinese: 南京中医学院; pinyin: Nánjīng Zhōngyī Xuéyuàn).

== Campuses ==
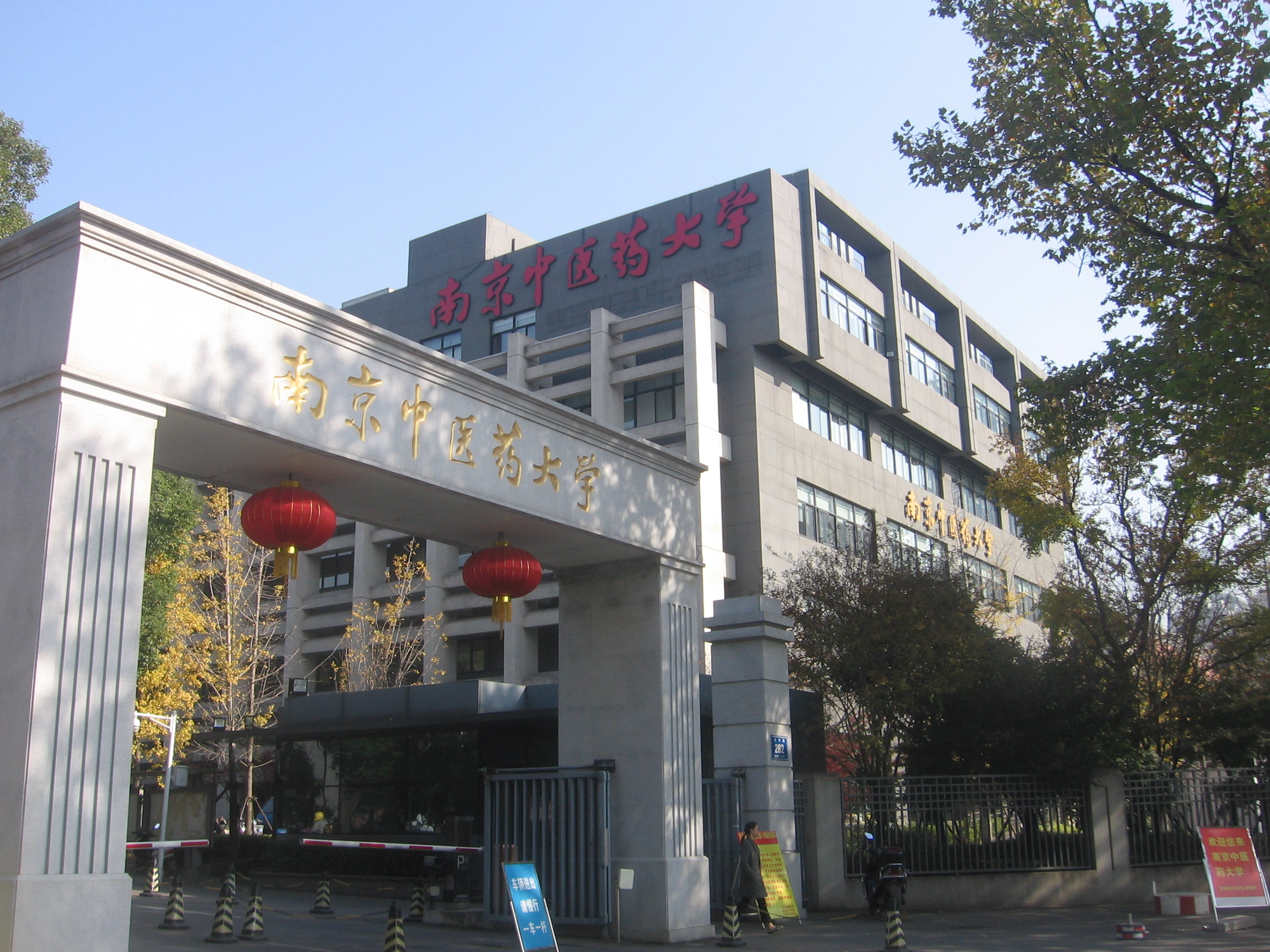
Hanzhongmen Campus

The Nanjing University of Chinese Medicine is located in the historic city of Nanjing, an ancient capital with various and long history. NJUCM has Xianlin, Hanzhongmen and Taizhou campuses. Currently, it has nearly 20,000 enrolled students. Xianlin is the new campus of the NJUCM that was opened up in 2002, covering 418,253 square meters of buildings for teaching, experiments, libraries, administrative offices, student dormitories, etc. The Taizhou campus opened up in 2020.

=== Campus addresses ===
Xianlin campus: 138 Xianlin Rd., Qixia District, Nanjing, China

Taizhou campus: 6 Kuangshi Rd., Pharmaceutical High tech District, Taizhou, China

Hanzhongmen campus: 282 Hanzhong Rd., Gulou District, Nanjing, China

== Academics ==
The university consists of 17 schools and institutes, as well as several affiliated hospitals and companies. As a leader in Chinese Medicine, NJUCM has successfully developed clinical research and teaching. Besides, the university has two library with over 1 millions volumes of printed books, which makes them one of the largest libraries holding Chinese-Medicine related books.

=== Library ===
The first library was founded in 1954, which was known as the Library of Jiangsu Traditional Chinese Medicine Training School. Now the Jingwen Library of the University at Xianlin Campus was established in 2005 with the generous donation of Dr. Chu Ching-wen, who is a prominent educational industrialist.

Currently, the libraries have more than 3,000 kinds and 40,000 volumes of ancient books, which consist of 40% of the existing ancient Chinese Medicine books. Every year, the libraries provides an open access to 1,056 kinds of printed Chinese and foreign journals, about 1 million Chinese and foreign electronic books, 21,000 kinds of journals as well as 96 kinds of database resources.

The Library has been transforming itself into a characteristic university library of both knowledge and research type by insistently taking the resources, technology and services as the center, with the purpose of promoting the application of Chinese medicine literature resources.

=== Affiliated hospitals ===
- The Affiliated Hospital of Nanjing University of Chinese Medicine
- The Second Affiliated Hospital of Nanjing University of Chinese Medicine
- Nanjing TCM Hospital Affiliated to Nanjing University of Chinese Medicine
- Changzhou TCM Hospital Affiliated to Nanjing University of Chinese Medicine
- Wuxi TCM Hospital Affiliated to Nanjing University of Chinese Medicine
- Suzhou TCM Hospital Affiliated to Nanjing University of Chinese Medicine
- Taizhou TCM Hospital Affiliated to Nanjing University of Chinese Medicine
- Nantong TCM Hospital Affiliated to Nanjing University of Chinese Medicine
- Yangzhou TCM Hospital Affiliated to Nanjing University of Chinese Medicine
- Xuzhou TCM Hospital Affiliated to Nanjing University of Chinese Medicine
- Yancheng TCM Hospital Affiliated to Nanjing University of Chinese Medicine
- Bayi Hospital Affiliated to Nanjing University of Chinese Medicine
- Jiangyin TCM Hospital Affiliated to Nanjing University of Chinese Medicine
- Kunshan TCM Hospital Affiliated to Nanjing University of Chinese Medicine
- Changshu TCM Hospital Affiliated to Nanjing University of Chinese Medicine
- Jiangyan TCM Hospital Affiliated to Nanjing University of Chinese Medicine
- Zhangjiagang TCM Hospital Affiliated to Nanjing University of Chinese Medicine
- Lianyungang TCM Hospital Affiliated to Nanjing University of Chinese Medicine
- Zhenjiang TCM Hospital Affiliated to Nanjing University of Chinese Medicine
- Wujin TCM Hospital Affiliated to Nanjing University of Chinese Medicine
- Nanjing Integrated Chinese and Western Medicine Hospital Affiliated to Nanjing University of Chinese Medicine
- Taicang TCM Hospital Affiliated to Nanjing University of Chinese Medicine
- Jiangsu Integrated Chinese and Western Medicine Hospital Affiliated to Nanjing University of Chinese Medicine
- Gulou Clinical Medicine School of Integrated Chinese and Western Medicine Affiliated to Nanjing University of Chinese Medicine
- Wuxi Clinical Medicine School of Integrated Chinese and Western Medicine, Nanjing University of Chinese Medicine
- Nantong Clinical Medicine School of Integrated Chinese and Western Medicine, Nanjing University of Chinese Medicine
- Lianyungang Clinical Medicine School of Integrated Chinese and Western Medicine, Nanjing University of Chinese Medicine
- Xuzhou Central Hospital Affiliated to Nanjing University of Chinese Medicine
- Nanjing General Hospital
- Hebei Yiling Hospital Affiliated to Nanjing University of Chinese Medicine
- Huai'an TCM Hospital Affiliated to Nanjing University of Chinese Medicine
- Suqian TCM Hospital Affiliated to Nanjing University of Chinese Medicine
- Rugao TCM Hospital Affiliated to Nanjing University of Chinese Medicine

=== Affiliated pharmaceutical companies ===
- Jiangsu Kanion Pharmaceutical
- Wai Yuen Tong
- SZYY Group Pharmaceutical Limited

=== Schools & institutes ===
- School of Basic Medicine
- School of the First Clinical Medicine
- School of the Second Clinical Medicine
- School of the Third Clinical Medicine
- School of Medicine and Life Sciences
- School of Integrative Medicine
- School of Pharmacy
- School of Health Economics and Management
- School of Nursing
- School of Foreign Languages
- School of International Education
- School of Information Technology
- School of Psychology
- International Jingfang Institute
- Graduate School
- School of Continued Education
- School of Humanities and Political Education

== International collaboration ==
The NJUCM is one of the first advanced Chinese medicine institutions authorized by the Ministry of Education to enroll international students, as well as students from Taiwan, Hong Kong and Macau. In 1993, NJUCM pioneered the practice of cooperating with RMIT University, Australia to facilitate the Bachelor program of Chinese Medicine. It has established 8 overseas Chinese Medicine Centers in succession respectively in Oceania, Europe and America. Its three TCM centers, Sino-Australia, Sino-Switzerland and Sino-France centers have become national-level overseas Chinese medicine center.

The NJUCM makes every effort to promote the understanding of Chinese Medicine in foreign countries with special focus in developing Confucius Institute and overseas Chinese Medicine Center. A leading Chinese Medicine Confucius Institute was established by NJUCM in collaboration with RMIT University, Australia on 20 June 2010.

The NJUCM currently has extensive communication and contact with over 90 countries and regions worldwide, and has established partnership with higher education institutions, government agencies and academic groups in over 30 countries and regions.

WHO Collaborating Center

The NJUCM was designated as the WHO Collaborating Center for Traditional Medicine on 5 August 1983. Currently, it has entered the 9th tenure consecutively. Terms of reference are: to contribute to WHO's efforts to increase the public awareness and knowledge sharing of traditional medicine facilitating its availability, accessibility and affordability in the member states; to contribute to WHO's efforts to encourage the traditional medicine communication and cooperation within and between countries strengthening regional and global networks.

- WHO collaboration annual reports

Collaboration news briefs

- Contacts with government
- Inter-university communication
- Academic exchange
- Confucius institute
- Collaboration projects

== Notable alumni ==
- Chen Guangcheng, civil rights activist
- Lang Yongchun, Chinese television host
