= Ah Nian =

Chinese film director

- 阿年
- Born: Huzhou City, Zhejiang Province, China
- Education: Beijing Broadcasting Institute
- Notable work: Age of Sensitivity

Ah Nian (Chinese: 阿年; pinyin: Ā Nián) is a Chinese film director, and part of China's sixth generation of directors, best known for his debut film Age of Sensitivity (感光时代).

== Early life ==
Ah Nian was born in 1965 in Huzhou City, Zhejiang Province, China. He graduated from the Beijing Broadcasting Institute in 1987, and worked for six years at the Zhejiang Film Studio.

== Career ==
His directorial debut film Sensitive Age or Age of Sensitivity (Ganguang shidai) won the special golden prize at the 6th 'Harbin Ice and Snow Cup Film Festival in 1994. The film was also nominated for the director's maiden work at the 4th Golden Rooster Award in 1995. It features a song by rock singer Cui Jian, Greenhouse Girl, "as a commentary on a young photographer's painstaking, solitary struggle within a commodified society and his yearnings for artistic and personal freedom." In 2005, Sensitive Age was recognized as one of 100 outstanding masterpieces in three hundred years across the Straits of Chinese films, representing 1994. A second film, A Chinese Moon (Zhongguo yueliang), followed in 1995.

The film City Love (also called Urban Love (Chengshi aiqing) or Love in the Winter (Dongri aiqing)) was banned by the China Film Bureau for its content regarding the Cultural Revolution (it includes "dream-like sequences ... in which the male lead remembers his parents' humiliation at the hands of the Red Guards") and cohabitation. The film participated in the 15th Turin International Film Festival, and the 45th Sebastian International Film Festival, as an Underground Film. After he returned home from the international film festivals, China revoked Ah Nian's directing qualifications.

In 1999, China Film Group invited Ah Nian to direct a youth film project, Call Me (Hu wo), and his directorial qualifications were restored. It has been described as "a labyrinthine narrative about lonely city dwellers desperately trying (and failing) to connect" Again, because of the film's sensitive subject matter regarding AIDS, the film was not released in China, but was screened at Lincoln Center in New York, New York University, and the Washington National Art Festival.

His upcoming film Number One (2019) will be released in China on April 24, 2019.
