= Liu Xiaoqian (journalist) =

Chinese journalist

Liu Xiaoqian (Chinese: 刘骁骞) is a Chinese journalist, known for his reporting stories on crime in Brazil, revolutionary guerrillas in Colombia and race riots in America.

== Early life ==
He was born in Jinjiang, Fujian province in 1988. He studied in Jinjiang and majored in Portuguese in Communication University of China, graduating in 2010.

== Career ==
In 2010 he joined CCTV. Since 2011, he has acted as the reporter for CCTV's Latin America center. Liu reported on the countdown to the Rio Olympics, slum tourism and Amazon rainforest protection. In April 2013, Liu participated in the large-scale report "exploring the amazon tide". In June 2013, one year before the opening anniversary of the football World Cup in Brazil, Liu broadcast an investigative report "Brazil at gunpoint".

In 2019 he relocated to America and began a series of reports on the nation including coverage of the protests related to race during the spring and summer of 2020.

== Personal life ==
He currently resides in Chicago.
