= Chen Yin (TV presenter) =

Chinese television program host on CCTV

Chen Yin (Chinese: 陈音; Chinese: 陳音; pinyin: Chén Yīn) is a Chinese television program host on CCTV.

== Early life ==
Chen Yin attended Cornell University, where she majored in Economics with concentration in international relations and East Asian studies.

== Career ==
Yin Chen started her Travelogue career in 2005. She went on to feature in various Travelogue specials, including "Street Special," where she went to Xitang in Zhejiang among other places; "History Special," where she went to Jingdezhen among other sites, "Ethnic Odyssey" where she went to Yunnan and Guizhou among other sites and "Being Beijing," where she explored Southern Beijing and the traditional hutongs near Shichahai. After a successful period, she went on to conduct fellow CCTV show, Culture Express.
