= CCTV-13 =

Chinese television news channel

- Country: China
- Broadcast area: Worldwide; Online
- Headquarters: China Media Group Headquarters

Programming
- Picture format: 1080i HDTV (downscaled to 576i for the SD feed)

Ownership
- Owner: China Central Television

History
- Launched: 1 May 2003
- Former names: CCTV News

Links
- Website: cctv13.cntv.cn

Availability

Terrestrial
- Digital TV (DTMB): Digital channel number varies by region
- Digital TV (Macau): Channel 72 (SD)

Streaming media
- CCTV program website: CCTV-13

CCTV-13 (Chinese: 中国中央电视台新闻频道, China Central Television News Channel), formerly CCTV News (Chinese: CCTV-新闻), broadcasting across China since 2003, is a 24-hour news channel of China Central Television and the biggest news channel in mainland China.

== History ==
The channel launched on 1 May 2003. It was created largely due to the broadcaster's flaws in its coverage of the September 11 attacks, which was accused by Yu Guoming as losing its role for information in times of crisis.

== Content ==
CCTV News channel broadcasts live news reports every hour throughout the day, as well as current affairs programmes in the evening. Bulletins cover domestic and international events. The channel broadcasts exclusively in Mandarin Chinese. Viewers from across the Greater China region and that of the Chinese diaspora can watch the channel via satellite. From the midday newscast on 16 October 2019, all newscasts and in-depth programming, with the exceptions of Xinwen Lianbo and Focus Report, is broadcast in 16:9 and produced in high definition. Xinwen Lianbo and Focus Report made the HD switchover on 18 July 2020, along with the channel's HD feed available through satellite from the next day.

== Programmes ==
=== Daily (in order of schedules, since 2009) ===
- Midnight News (午夜新闻)
- Morning News (朝闻天下)
- Live News (新闻直播间)
- News 30' (新闻30分)
- Law Online (法治在线)
- Focus On (共同关注)
- Xinwen Lianbo (新闻联播)
- Weather Forecast (天气预报)
- Focus Report (焦点访谈)
- Oriental Horizon (东方时空)
- News 1+1 (新闻1+1)
- World Express (国际时讯)
- The World (环球视线)
- 24 Hours (24小时)

=== Weekly ===
- Weekly Quality Report (每周质量报告)
- Face to Face/One on One (面对面)
- World Weekly (世界周刊)
- News Weekly (新闻周刊)
- News Probe (新闻调查)
- Military Time (军情时间到)
- Leaders Talk (高端访谈)

=== Special ===
- Breaking News (突发新闻)
- Year After Year (一年又一年)
- Employment is in Place/Employment has a Future (就业有位来)

== See also ==
- CGTN, formerly CCTV News (English channel) also available in Globally and Americas
- Phoenix InfoNews Channel
