= China Central Television =

Chinese national broadcaster

China Central Television 中国中央电视台

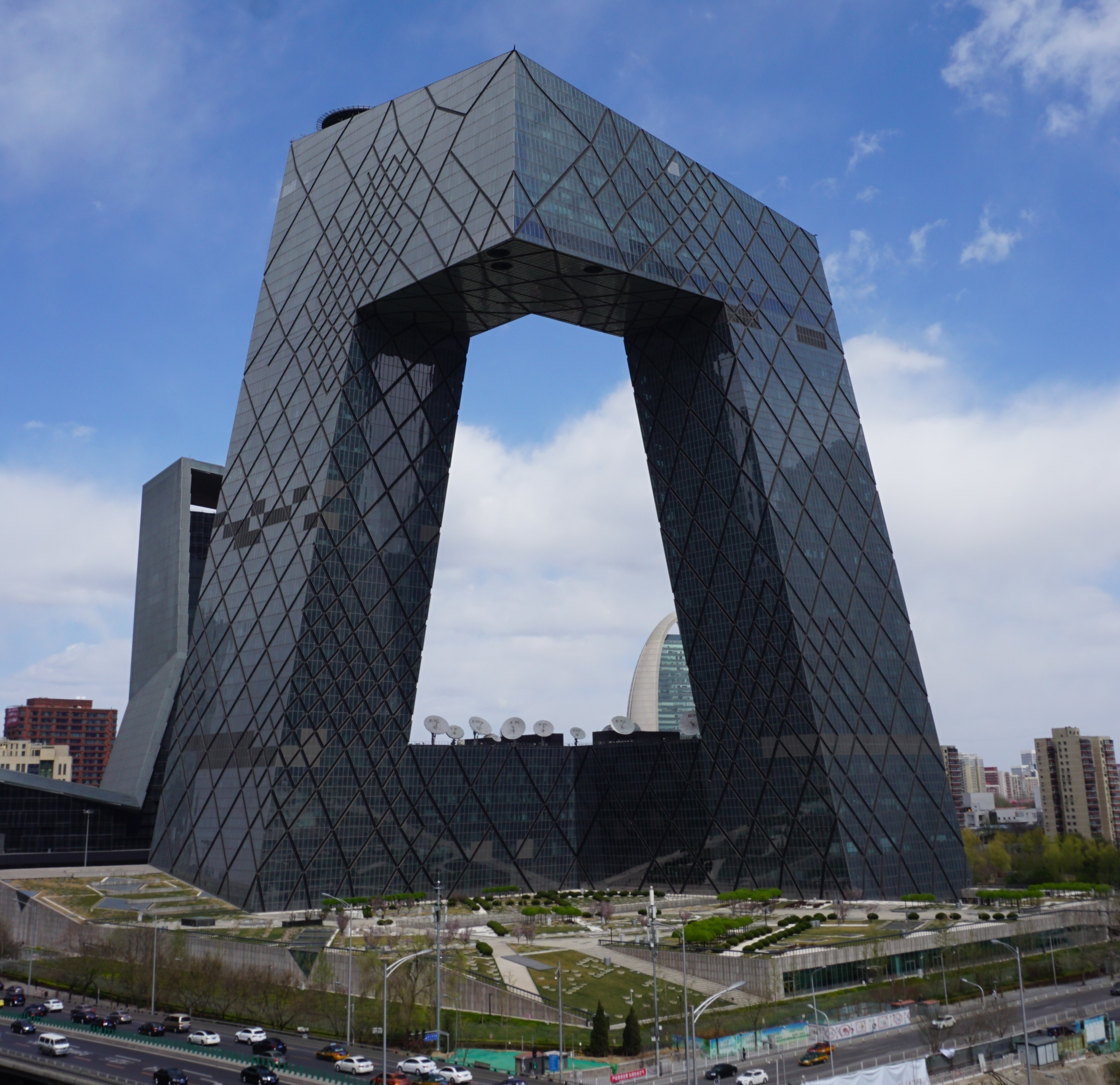
- The China Central Television Headquarters in 2019
- Type: State media
- Country: China
- First air date: 1 May 1958; 68 years ago
- Founded: Beijing
- Headquarters: CCTV Headquarters, Beijing, China
- Broadcast area: Worldwide
- Parent: China Media Group
- Former names: Beijing Television
- Free channels: 25
- Pay channels: 19
- Callsigns: Voice of China (external)
- Affiliation: China Global Television Network
- Official website: english.cctv.com
- Subsidiary: China International Television Corporation

China Central Television
- Simplified Chinese: 中国中央电视台
- Traditional Chinese: 中國中央電視台
- Literal meaning: China Central Television Station
Transcriptions
Standard Mandarin
- Hanyu Pinyin: Zhōngguó Zhōngyāng Diànshìtái
- Gwoyeu Romatzyh: Jonggwo Jongiang Diannshyhtair
- Wade–Giles: Chunghuo Chungyang Tienshiht'ai
Yue: Cantonese
- Jyutping: zung1 gwok3 zung1 joeng1 din6 si6 toi4

Chinese abbreviation
- Simplified Chinese: 中央电视台
- Traditional Chinese: 中央電視台
- Literal meaning: Central Television Station
Transcriptions
Standard Mandarin
- Hanyu Pinyin: Zhōngyāng Diànshìtái
- Gwoyeu Romatzyh: Jongiang Diannshyhtair
- Wade–Giles: Chungyang Tienshiht'ai
Yue: Cantonese
- Jyutping: zung1 joeng1 din6 si6 toi4

Second alternative Chinese name
- Simplified Chinese: 央视
- Traditional Chinese: 央視
- Literal meaning: Central-Vision
Transcriptions
Standard Mandarin
- Hanyu Pinyin: Yāngshì
- Gwoyeu Romatzyh: Iangshyh
- Wade–Giles: Yang-shih
Yue: Cantonese
- Jyutping: joeng1 si6

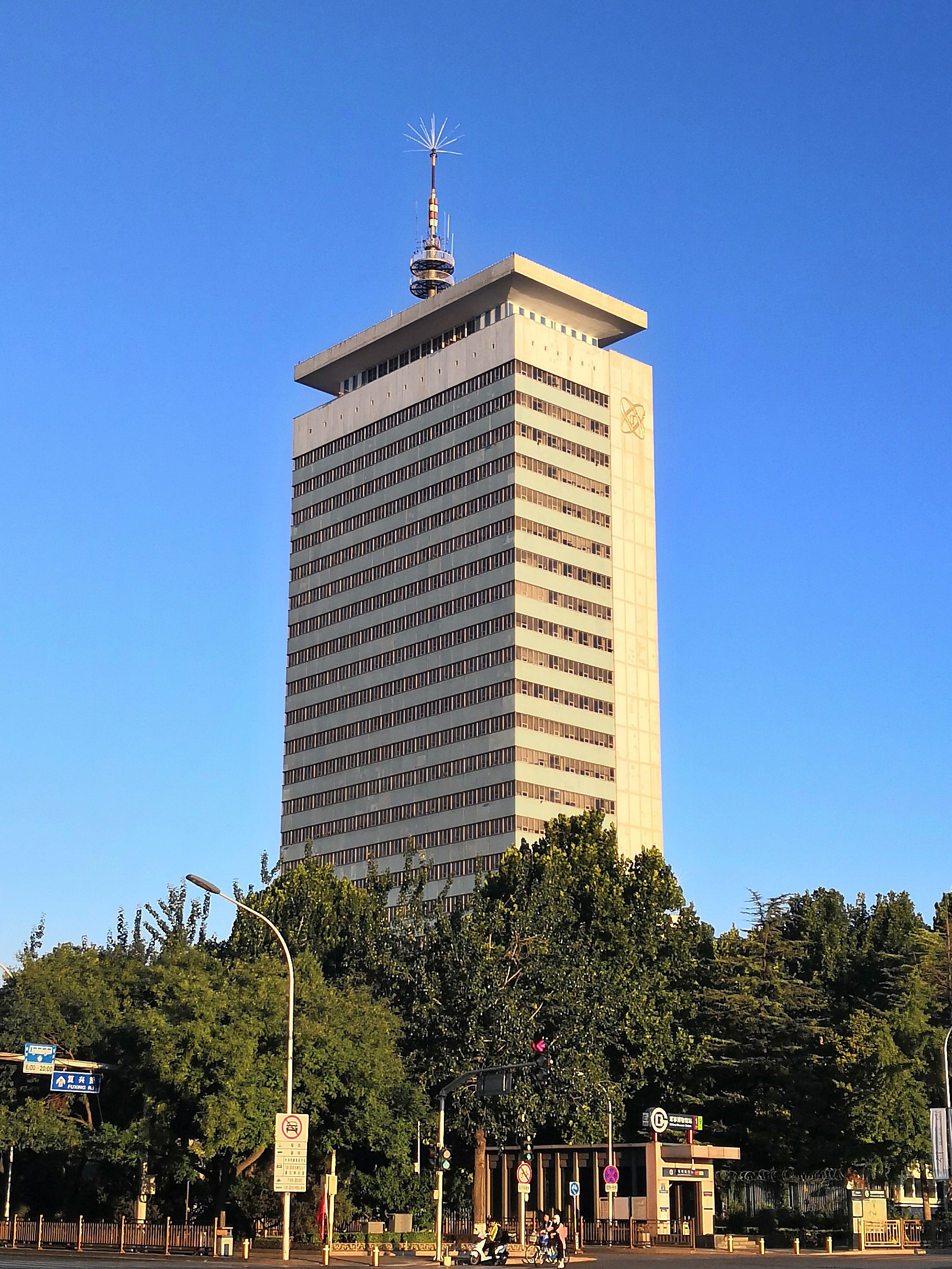
China Media Group Headquarters

China Central Television (CCTV) is the national television broadcaster of the People's Republic of China. Established in 1958 as Peking Television, it was renamed as CCTV in 1978 and is a key player in Chinese state media. It is operated by China Media Group, supervised by National Radio and Television Administration, and led by the Publicity Department of the Chinese Communist Party.

== History ==
In 1954, Mao Zedong put forward that China should establish its own TV station. On 5 February 1955, the central broadcasting bureau reported to the State Council and proposed the program of establishing a medium-sized television station, later on premier Zhou Enlai included in China's first five-year plan the planned introduction of television broadcasts. In December 1957, the central broadcasting bureau sent Luo Donghe and Meng Qiyu to the Soviet Union and the German Democratic Republic for the inspection of their TV stations, such as Television in the Soviet Union and Deutscher Fernsehfunk, then the duo returned to Beijing to prepare for the establishment of the TV station. The station officially signed on for the first time as Peking Television on 1 May 1958, and began airing on 2 September of the same year.

Peking Television was formally renamed China Central Television on 1 May 1978, and a new logo was unveiled, in time for its 20th anniversary. Until the late 1970s, CCTV held only evening broadcasts, usually closing down at midnight. During the summer and winter academic vacations, it occasionally transmitted daytime programming for students, while special daytime programs were aired during national holidays.

In 1980, CCTV experimented with news relays from local and central television studios via microwave. It also had its first international collaboration that year, production of the documentary series Silk Road with Japan's public broadcasting company, NHK. In 1984, CCTV established the wholly owned subsidiary China International Television Corporation (CITVC). A one-year deal with U.S. network CBS was signed in June 1983 to supply the network with 64 hours of shows.

By 1985, CCTV had already become a leading television network in China. In 1987, CCTV grew due to the adaptation and presentation of Dream of the Red Chamber, the first Chinese television drama to enter the global market. In the same year, CCTV exported 10,216 shows to 77 foreign television stations.

Initially, the CCP's Central Publicity Department issued directive censorship of programs. During reform in the 1990s, it adopted new standards for CCTV, "affordability" and "acceptability", loosening the previous government control. Affordability refers to purchasing ability of programs, while acceptability requires that a program has acceptable content, preventing the broadcast of material that contains inappropriate content or expresses views against the CCP. In 2001, an Australian author argued that increasing commercialization of CCTV had enhanced its propaganda abilities.

In March 2018, as the nation began marking the 60th year of television, CCTV ownership changed hands to a new state holding group, the China Media Group, as part of the deepening the reform of the Party and state institutions.

=== Overseas broadcasting ===
In 1990, CCTV subsidiary, CITVC, established China Television Corporation in California to distribute CCTV content in the U.S. In 2000, CCTV's all-English channel, known as CCTV-9 or CCTV International, was launched.

In 2001, the Great Foreign Publicity Plan was launched by Xu Guangchun, the head of SARFT, also the deputy head of the CCP's Central Publicity Department after the urgency of bringing the voice of China to the world was presented by Jiang Zemin, former General Secretary of the Chinese Communist Party. The idea of an English channel was brought out in 1996. CCTV-4 had three half-hour English news broadcasts every day, but later, on 25 September 2000, CCTV-9 a satellite channel, was set up to be the first 24-hour English channel, aimed to establish the overseas market. In October 2001, CCTV partnered with AOL Time Warner and other foreign news corporations, giving them access to the Chinese media market in exchange for cable delivery in the US and Europe, mainly delivering CCTV-9 programs.

The CCTV-4 channel split into three separate channels on 1 April 2007—each serving different time zones: China Standard Time (CST), Greenwich Mean Time (GMT), and Eastern Standard Time (EST)—in order to improve service for audiences around the world.

On 25 July 2009, CCTV launched its Arabic-language international channel, stating that it aims to maintain stronger links with Arab nations.

In 2015 and 2018, CCTV signed cooperation agreements with Russian state media outlet RT.

In December 2016, CCTV's foreign language services were spun off into China Global Television Network (CGTN).

CCTV and Uzbekistan's National Television and Radio Corporation (UzTRK) cooperate to produce joint programs and documentaries.

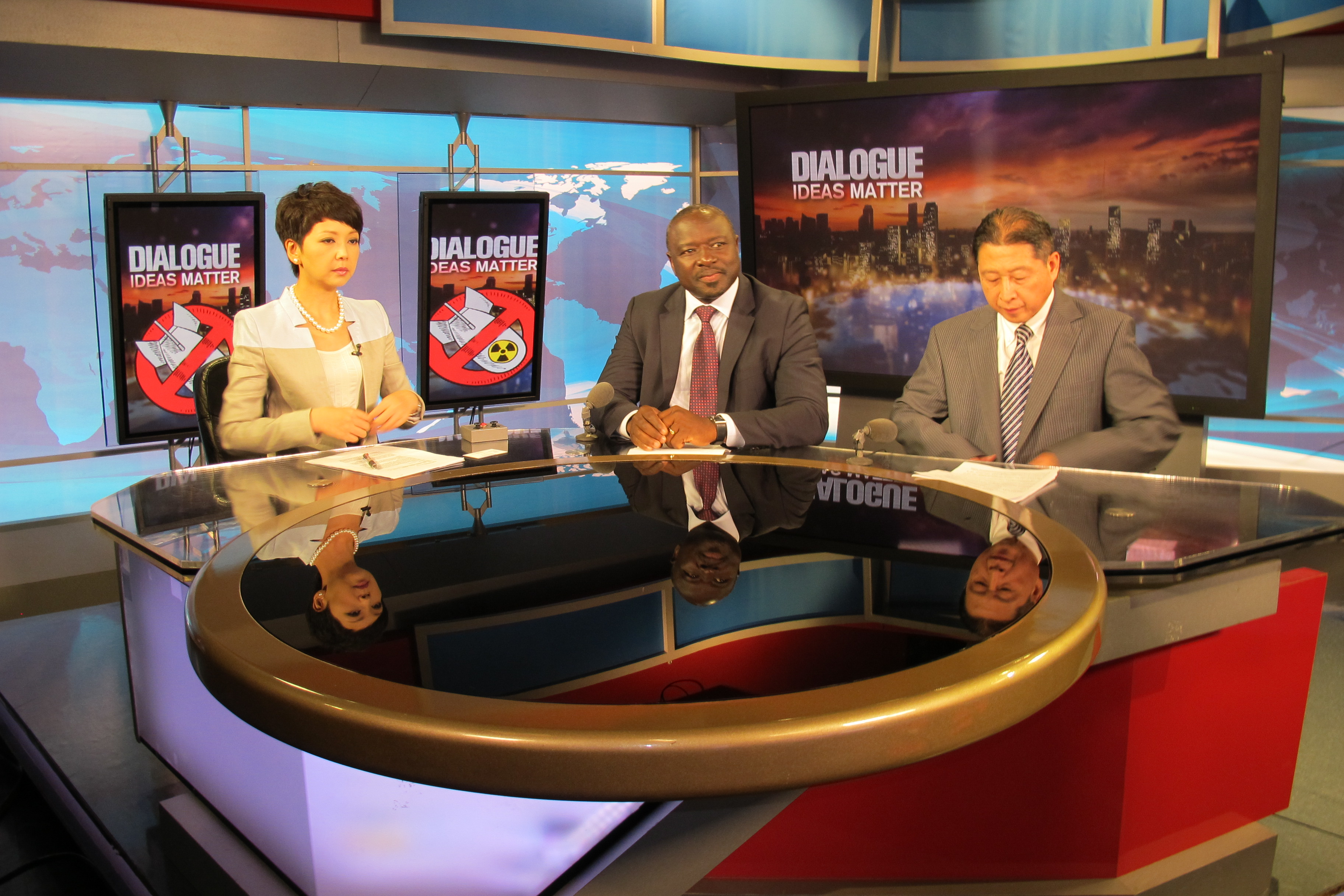
Lassina Zerbo interviewed by China Central Television

==== China Network Television ====
China Network Television (CNTV) was an internet-based broadcaster of China Central Television which launched on 28 December 2009.

== Organization ==
China Central Television, as a component of the China Media Group (CMG), falls under the supervision of the National Radio and Television Administration which is in turn subordinate to the CCP's Central Publicity Department. The organization is considered one of the "big three" state media outlets in China, along with the People's Daily and Xinhua News Agency.

=== Management ===
The current president of CCTV is Shen Haixiong, who was appointed in February 2018, and also appointed as a deputy head of the CCP's Central Publicity Department.

== Programs ==
CCTV produces its own news broadcasts three times a day. Its thirty-minute evening news, Xinwen Lianbo ("CCTV Network News" or "CCTV Tonight", Chinese: 新闻联播), goes on air daily at 7:00 pm Beijing time. All local stations are required to carry CCTV's news broadcast. An internal CCTV survey indicates that nearly 500 million people countrywide regularly watch this program. Freedom House and The Guardian commented that CCTV's reporting about topics sensitive to the Chinese government and the Chinese Communist Party (CCP) is distorted and often used as a weapon against the party's perceived enemies.

Focus Report (jiaodian fangtan), first introduced in 1994, is a popular CCTV show which regularly exposes the wrongdoings of local officials, which attracts serious attention from higher levels of government. It also exposed the Chinese government's response to charges of corruption. In 1998, Premier Zhu Rongji praised the program as an important tool of media supervision (yulun jiandu).

The CCTV New Year's Gala (Chinese: 中国中央电视台春节联欢晚会)—a yearly special program for the Chinese New Year—is the most-watched CCTV show.

In 2003, CCTV launched its first 24-hour news channel, initially available to cable viewers.

=== Audience share ===
As of 2007, China's television audience rose to 1.2 billion. As content becomes more diversified, there have been concerns about the audience share, as CCTV is losing out to cable, satellite and regional networks. In Guangzhou for example, CCTV programming only accounts for 45% of the weekly audience share, while in Shanghai, local stations also have share over CCTV. However, the CCTV New Year's Gala remains extremely popular; it acquires more than 90% audience share over the nation.

=== Personalities ===
Producing a variety of different programming, China Central Television has a number of different program hosts, news anchors, correspondents, and contributors who appear throughout daily programing on the network.

- Ai Hua
- Bai Yansong
- Bao Xiaofeng
- Daniela Anahí Bessia
- Bi Fujian
- Chai Jing
- Chai Lu
- Chen Yin
- Dashan
- Dong Hao
- Dong Qing
- Gao Bo
- Gang Qiang
- Guo Zhijian
- Hai Xia
- He Jing
- Jing Yidan
- Ju Ping
- Vimbayi Kajese
- Kang Hui
- Michele Lean
- Li Ruiying
- Li Sisi
- Li Xiaomeng
- Li Yong
- Li Zimeng
- Liu Chunyan
- Lu Jian
- Edwin Maher
- Ouyang Xiadan
- Negmat Rahman
- Ren Luyu
- Rui Chenggang
- Sa Beining
- Wang Ning
- Wang Xiaoya
- Wang Zhi'an
- Zhang Hongmin
- Zhang Mengmeng
- Zhang Tengyue
- Zhou Tao
- Zhu Jun
- Zhu Xun

== Reception ==
The network's principal directors and other officers are appointed by the State, and so are the top officials at local conventional television stations in mainland China; nearly all of them are restricted to broadcasting within their own province or municipality. Editorial independence is subject to government policy considerations, and as a result, its history and news channels have been charged with being "propaganda aimed at brainwashing the audience" in a letter written by a number of Chinese intellectuals who also called for a boycott of state media was posted on a US-based website and has circulated through Chinese websites. The network often publishes misleading and false information, particularly as it pertains to issues considered sensitive by the Chinese government. However, only a small percentage of the Network's programming can be described as "abusive or demonizing propaganda."

Journalists working for the network's English-language international channel, CGTN, as well as of the other non-Chinese language TV channels under the CGTN banner, are under constant pressure to present a positive account of China, according to Anne-Marie Brady's study published in 2008. "In August 2005, a series of items reported factually on the coal mining disaster in China; soon after, the channel's leaders received a warning from the Ministry of Foreign Affairs that its reports were harming China's international image. Following this incident, senior editorial staff and journalists were all forced to write self-criticisms."

Brady says that while the channel's equipment is state-of-the-art, the employees are not well trained in how to use it, so there are frequent errors during a broadcast. "The political controls on the station contribute to a generally low level of morale and initiative among station staff," she writes.

A study done by the observer of Chinese film and television, Ying Zhu, suggests that "CCTV is full of serious-minded creators who regularly experience bouts of self-doubt, philosophical ambivalence, and in some cases, clinical depression." During her extensive interviews with key CCTV players, Zhu notes that "Certain common themes, about ideals, distorted or altogether thwarted by commercial and political pressure, emerged."

According to Freedom House, CCTV "has a consistent record of blatantly and egregiously violating journalistic standards and encouraging or justifying hatred and violence against innocent people. CCTV is an essential component of the CCP's brutal authoritarian regime and should be treated as such."

In 2020, the United States Department of State designated CCTV as a foreign mission, which requires it to disclose more about its operations in the U.S.

=== Incidents ===
Since its inception, CCTV has served as a tool of state power and, as such, has been complicit in human rights abuses. They have a history of demonizing and inciting hatred against those perceived as foes by the CCP. In this way, its broadcasts can be used to mobilize against perceived enemies as diverse as Falun Gong and international human rights groups.

==== 1990s Falun Gong crackdown ====
In 1999, during the first crackdown on Falun Gong, CCTV's Focus Talk ran 28 episodes over a 32-day period, which defamed practitioners and incited hatred against them. In 2001, they claimed that a group of people who had set themselves on fire in Tiananmen Square were Falun Gong adherents, a claim which was characterized as "clearly abusive" by the Canadian regulatory commission.

==== Xinwen Lianbo and fake imagery ====
On 23 January 2011, Xinwen Lianbo showcased the Chengdu J-10 firing a missile at a plane, causing it to explode. The footage lasted half a second, and the destroyed plane shown was later identified as that of an F-5E, a US fighter jet. The clip was later revealed to have been taken from the 1986 US movie Top Gun.

==== Comments by CCTV head Hu Zhanfan ====
In 2011, the new CCTV head Hu Zhanfan "was found to have proclaimed in July [or January, both before the CCTV appointment in November] that journalists' foremost responsibility is to 'be a good mouthpiece'". Internet posts of the comment blossomed after the appointment, one "juxtapos[ing] CCTV's ... Xinwen Lianbo (新闻联播) and photos of Chinese crowds waving red flags with black-and-white images from Nazi-era Germany". Comparisons with the Nazi propaganda chief Joseph Goebbels also spread. Official media coverage of Hu's presentation focused on his call to avoid "fake news and false reports (失实报道)" but also incorporated the "mouthpiece" comment.

==== Broadcasting forced confessions ====
CCTV regularly broadcasts the forced confessions of accused or convicted criminals and produces programming to go along with them. These programs are often filmed before the beginning of formal judicial procedures. Domestic dissidents such as lawyers, journalists, and activists, as well as foreigners, have been victims of this practice.

In 2013, Peter Humphrey and Charles Xue's forced confessions were aired on CCTV. Since being freed, Humphrey has been highly critical of CCTV and the practice of airing forced confessions. In 2020, the British media regulator Ofcom sided with Humphrey and announced sanctions against CGTN, which aired Humphrey's confession and was branded as CCTV News at the time.

In 2014, CCTV broadcast the forced confession of the then-septuagenarian journalist Gao Yu.

In 2016, Peter Dahlin and Gui Minhai's forced confessions were aired on CCTV. In 2019 Dahlin filed a complaint against China Global Television Network (CGTN) and China Central Television-4 (CCTV-4) with Canadian authorities.

On 21 November 2019, CCTV's international arm CGTN aired a video of a forced confession from Hong Kong activist Simon Cheng. Within a week, Cheng had filed a new complaint to Ofcom over the broadcast.

In 2020, the forced confession of Taiwanese citizen Lee Meng-chu was aired on a CCTV program. A day later, the same program aired the forced confession of an academic from Taiwan accused of espionage and separatist activities.

==== 2009 fire ====
On 9 February 2009, the Beijing Television Cultural Center caught fire on the last day of the festivities of Chinese New Year, killing one firefighter. The blaze rendered the 42-story structure unusable, as the zinc and titanium alloy of the outer skin was burnt.

The fire had implications for the credibility of CCTV, which was already unpopular because of its dominance in the media. The incident was mocked by netizens who reproduced photoshopped photos of the fire and criticized CCTV for censoring coverage. Pictures of the fire were widely distributed on the internet, as a result of citizen journalism.

==== Libyan Civil War ====
During the 2011 military intervention in Libya, reports from CCTV tended to support Muammar Gaddafi's arguments, claiming that the coalition forces attacked Libyan civilians and the military intervention was no different from an invasion. In some of the news reports, CCTV used images of demonstrators and said that they were against NATO's military intervention. CCTV also mislabeled a person holding a banner which said "Vive la France" ("long live France" in French) and claimed that he was a supporter of Gaddafi. Later on 27 March, a Chinese banner that said "Muammar Gaddafi is a liar. [sic]" was shown in some Libyan demonstration videos on the Internet.

==== 2019 NBA free speech dispute ====
In 2019, CCTV announced that they were cancelling the broadcast of two National Basketball Association preseason games in response to a tweet in support of pro-democracy protests in Hong Kong by the General Manager of the Houston Rockets, Daryl Morey. After Adam Silver defended the Morey's right to free speech, CCTV responded: "We express our strong dissatisfaction and opposition to Silver's stated support of Morey's right to free speech. We believe any remarks that challenge national sovereignty and social stability do not belong to the category of free speech," and continued, "We will also immediately examine all other cooperation and exchanges with the NBA."

==== Censorship and disinformation about the Russian invasion of Ukraine ====
During the 2022 Winter Paralympics, CCTV censored a speech by International Paralympic Committee president Andrew Parsons condemning the Russian invasion of Ukraine. CCTV promoted Russian disinformation, such as unsubstantiated claims of biological weapons labs in Ukraine. In April 2022, CCTV repeated Russian claims that the Bucha massacre was staged.

==== Censorship during the 2022 COVID-19 protests ====
During the 2022 COVID-19 protests in China, CCTV's coverage of the 2022 FIFA World Cup censored scenes of maskless fans in the stadium. CCTV avoided coverage of the protests directly.

==== Fukushima Daiichi Nuclear Power Plant ====
In 2023, CCTV ran paid ads on social media platforms in multiple countries and languages denouncing the discharge of radioactive water of the Fukushima Daiichi Nuclear Power Plant, which critics labeled part of a concerted disinformation campaign.

==== Military exercises around Taiwan ====
During China's Justice Mission 2025 military exercises around Taiwan, CCTV posted footage of Taipei 101, suggesting that a PLA drone had flown close to the skyscraper. The Taiwanese government stated that this was part of China's ongoing cognitive warfare campaign against Taiwan. A retired Taiwanese general told CTi International that the footage, possibly from a Tengden TB-001, was likely to be authentic.

==== Mbappé’s Joke ====
In late 2026, Kylian Mbappé joked about a meme putting his face on a "Chinese dictator" resembling Mao Zedong. He later apologized for his "ill-judged" remarks, yet CCTV still did not to air the initial La Liga matches on November 1.

== See also ==
- Mass media in China
- Television in the People's Republic of China
