= Communication University of China =

Public university in Beijing, China

- 中国传媒大学
- Former name: Beijing Broadcasting College (1959–2004)
- Motto: 立德、敬业、博学、竞先
- Motto in English: Integrity, Professionalism, Erudition and Competence
- Type: Public university
- Established: 1954; 72 years ago
- President: Zhang, Shu-Ting
- Faculty: 1,115
- Students: 14,623
- Undergraduates: 9,452
- Postgraduates: 5,171
- Location: Beijing, China; 39.909106°N 116.550162°E
- Campus: Urban, 46.37 ha (114.6 acres)
- Website: en.cuc.edu.cn

Chinese name
- Simplified Chinese: 中国传媒大学
- Traditional Chinese: 中國傳媒大學
Transcriptions
Standard Mandarin
- Hanyu Pinyin: Zhōngguó Chuánméi Dàxué

The Communication University of China (CUC) is a public university in Chaoyang, Beijing, China. It is affiliated with the Ministry of Education. The university is part of the Double First-Class Construction and Project 211.

CUC developed from what used to be a training center for technicians of the Central Broadcasting Bureau that was founded in 1954. In April 1959, it was upgraded to the Beijing Broadcasting College (Chinese: 北京广播学院; pinyin: Běijīng Guǎngbō Xuéyuàn) approved by the State Council. In August 2004, the Beijing Broadcasting College was renamed the Communication University of China. CUC is located in the eastern part of Beijing near the ancient canal, which occupies 463,700 square meters of land and a total of 499,800 square meters of buildings.

== History ==
CUC's history dates back to March 3, 1954, when the first training class for broadcasting professionals was held by the then Central Radio Administration. This then led to the founding of Beijing Broadcasting College in 1958. On September 7, 1959, CUC's precursor Beijing Broadcasting Institute (BBI) was established.

Since 2019, CUC hosts the Institute for a Community with Shared Future (ICSF), which serves to promote the concept of "community of a shared future for mankind" internationally. ICSF is overseen directly by the Ministry of Education and manages multiple Research Centers for Community with a Shared Future in several countries.

== Confucius Institutes ==
Communication University of China has co-established three Confucius Institutes for providing Chinese language and cultural education for learners outside of China.

- Belgrade Confucius Institute (in cooperation with University of Belgrade, Serbia)
- Groningen Confucius Institute (in cooperation with University of Groningen, Hanze University of Applied Sciences Groningen, and the Municipality of Groningen.)
- Confucius Institute at Federal University of Rio Grand Do Sul (in cooperation with the Universidade Federal do Rio Grande do Sul, Brasil)

== Modern foreign languages teaching ==
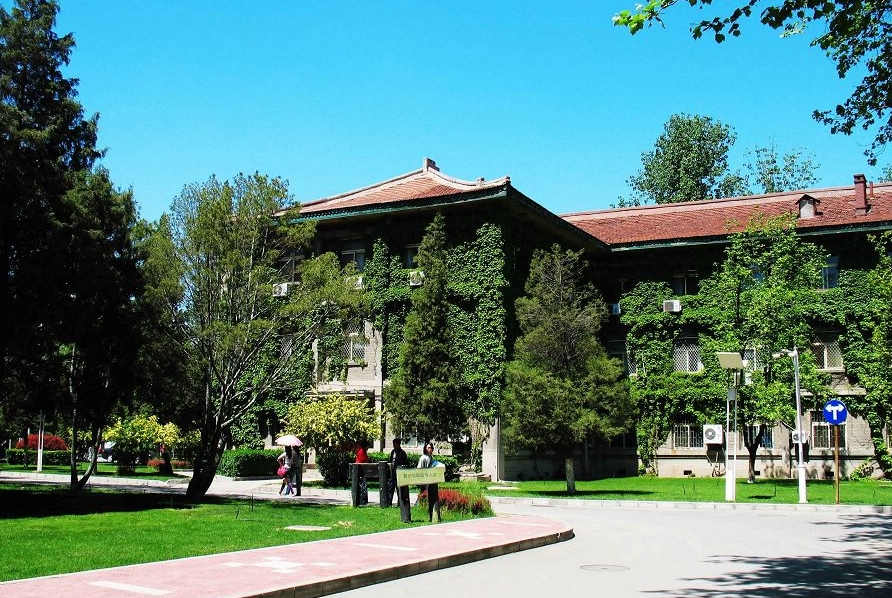
The School of International Studies

Communication University of China is one of the officially sanctioned important bases in China for teaching foreign languages and especially narrowly used languages. It once offered English, Spanish, French, Russian, German, Japanese, Korean, Portuguese and other language courses.

There is a Center for Portuguese Studies (originally, Centro de Língua Portuguesa Dr. Stanley Ho) under a Cooperation Protocol between CUC, Camões Institute (Portugal) and IPOR (Macau) since 2005.

== Rankings ==
Communication University of China was a "Project 211" university.

Sohu regarded CUC as one of the most competitive universities for admission in China in 2018.

In September 2017, CUC was selected as one of 140 Double First-Class Construction universities approved by the Ministry of Education.

In the fourth round of China University Subject Rankings (CUSR) by the Chinese Ministry of Education in 2018, Communication University of China ranked first in mainland China with its two disciplinary areas evaluated as A+ disciplines, including "Journalism and Communication" and "Drama, Film and Television Studies" and ranked third with A− in "Art Theory", tenth with B+ in "Design", 19th with B in "Fine Arts" in China.

== Notable alumni ==
Communication University of China is known for fostering media administrators, producers, journalists and TV presenters in China. Some of its notable alumni include:

- Luo Jing, news presenter from China Central Television
- Cui Yongyuan, television host from China Central Television
- Bi Fujian, television host from China Central Television
- Chen Luyu, a Phoenix Television talk show host.
- Li Yong, television host from China Central Television
- Bai Yansong, news presenter from China Central Television
- Huang Wei, actress, television host from China Central Television
- Chai Jing, former journalist from China Central Television
- Chen Luyu, host from Hong Kong's Phoenix Television
- Zhang Haijie, news presenter from Singapore's MediaCorp Channel 8
- Chen Xiaonan, a Phoenix Television talk show host.
- Li Xiang, actress, television host and singer.
- Alex Man, Hong Kong actor
- Dong Zhen, singer-songwriter
- Sandra Ma, television and movie actress
- Zining, singer-songwriter, Rocket Girls 101's member
- Fu Yaning, singer and actress
- Liu Xiaoqian, journalist
