= CMG Spring Festival Gala =

Variety show on Chinese TV

- Directed by: Various
- Presented by: Various
- Ending theme: "Can't Forget Tonight" (难忘今宵)
- Country of origin: China
- Original language: Chinese language

Production
- Running time: approximately 270 minutes

Original release
- Network: China Media Group (CCTV, CNR, CGTN, CRI)
- Release: February 12, 1983 – present

CMG Spring Festival Gala
- Simplified Chinese: 中央广播电视总台春节联欢晚会
- Traditional Chinese: 中央廣播電視總台春節聯歡晚會
Transcriptions
Standard Mandarin
- Hanyu Pinyin: Zhōngyāng Guǎngbō Diànshì Zǒngtaí chūnjié liánhuān wǎnhuì

Alternative Chinese name
- Simplified Chinese: 中国中央电视台春节联欢晚会
- Traditional Chinese: 中國中央電視台春節聯歡晚會
Transcriptions
Standard Mandarin
- Hanyu Pinyin: Zhōngguó zhōngyāng diànshìtái chūnjié liánhuān wǎnhuì

Second alternative Chinese name
- Simplified Chinese: 央视春晚
- Traditional Chinese: 央視春晚
Transcriptions
Standard Mandarin
- Hanyu Pinyin: Yāngshì Chūnwăn
- IPA: [jáŋ ʂɻ̩̂ ʈʂʰwə́n wàn]

Further abbreviated as
- Chinese: 春晚
Transcriptions
Standard Mandarin
- Hanyu Pinyin: Chūnwăn
- IPA: [ʈʂʰwə́n wàn]

The CMG Spring Festival Gala (formerly known as the CCTV New Year's Gala; commonly abbreviated in Chinese as Chunwan or 春晚) is a Chinese New Year special gala produced by China Media Group (CMG). The Gala is a live variety show featuring music, dance, and comedy performances alongside official messaging, held annually on Chinese New Year's Eve since it was first aired in February 1983. It was recognized by Guinness World Records as the most watched national network TV broadcast in 2012 and is widely recognized as the world's most watched television program.

== History ==
In the early 1980s, CCTV director Huang Yihe proposed the idea of hosting a televised party to celebrate the Chinese New Year, and the first CCTV New Year's Gala aired in 1983. Operating on a very low budget, Huang was given a studio of 600 square meters (6,500 sq ft), which could accommodate only 60 staff members and 200 guests. With no money for recording and editing, the show was improvised and broadcast live. It was hosted by Liu Xiaoqing, Ma Ji, Jiang Kun, and Wang Jingyu, and the studio had four telephones accepting live requests from callers nationwide. The popular singer Li Guyi ended the night with nine performances, and the cohost Jiang Kun performed three xiangsheng comedies. Huang and his colleagues took considerable political risk broadcasting the live show, as pop singers such as Li Guyi were at the time under attack by hardliners as "spiritual pollution", and one of her most popular songs, Hometown Love (乡恋), was still officially banned. With the permission from Wu Lengxi, the Minister of Radio and Television who was in the audience, Li Guyi performed the song for the first time on national TV.

After the first New Year Gala proved a huge hit with viewers nationwide, Wu was tasked with directing the second edition. At the time, China and Britain were under intense negotiation over the Sino-British Joint Declaration on the status of Hong Kong. Huang came up with the idea of inviting the amateur Hong Kong singer Cheung Ming-man to perform at his show. It was then unprecedented for a Hong Kong entertainer to perform on Chinese TV and his request met significant resistance. Huang persistently lobbied government officials and eventually gained their approval. Cheung's performance of the patriotic song "My Chinese Heart" at the 1984 gala made him a household name in China.

The program has attracted extremely large audiences, which have grown significantly over the years. The CCTV New Year's Gala is the most watched television program in the world, with the broadcaster claiming one billion viewers in 2018. As the Chinese New Year's Eve is a time when the family gathers, the typical situation involves a large 3-generation family gathered in front of their TV set while making dumplings for the first New Year's meal. The Gala adds a mood of celebration in the house as people laugh, discuss and enjoy the performance. It has become an ingrained tradition on mainland China to watch the New Year's Gala on New Year's Eve. Rural areas that had previously been unfamiliar with concepts such as television would hold great gatherings on New Year's Eve to watch the program.

In 2011, Dashan made another appearance in the gala, alongside several foreign nationals of various ages, all engaging in fluent Mandarin conversation, including one of Russian nationality, an Australian and a Kenyan. The 2011 show was also noted for the appearances of various "ordinary people" performers who were selected by popular vote in a TV competition months prior.

The 'ordinary people' portrayals continued in 2012; several amateurs performed on the show. Coinciding with the rise of amateur performers is the decline of nationalist and political rhetoric. In both 2011 and 2012 versions of the Gala, imagery of national leaders were removed from the show. The 2012 gala was directed by Ha Wen, wife of host Li Yong. In a break with tradition, the 2012 Gala removed the announcements of embassies overseas sending New Year's greetings, as well as the "My Favorite New Year's Gala Act" voting announcement. It also did not conclude with a rendition of "Can't Forget Tonight", thus breaking the practice for the first time.

Beginning in the 1990s, the Gala has been broadcast to the Chinese diaspora and millions of television viewers around the world on CCTV-4 with dedicated simulcasts for foreign viewers on the CGTN network since 2016.

The Gala marked its pearl jubilee in 2013 and its ruby jubilee in 2023. Its 2008 silver jubilee edition also added up to the hype and excitement regarding the 2008 Beijing Summer Olympics, CCTV being official national broadcaster of the Games.

== Politics ==
In the early days of the Gala in the 1980s, the show focused almost entirely on arts and entertainment. Programming that was chiefly political in nature was very rare, reflecting the general openness of Chinese society in the 1980s and the departure of Maoist political dogma from the lives of ordinary people. Communist Party leaders took an interest in the show as early as 1984, when then-General Secretary Hu Yaobang watched the show and resolved to learn how to sing "My Chinese Heart" by singer Cheung Ming-man. Then, in 1990, Communist Party General Secretary Jiang Zemin and Premier Li Peng appeared on the show, ostensibly to participate in the celebration rather than disseminate a political agenda; Jiang gave a speech expressing his well-wishes. This six-minute live segment was the only instance national leaders participated in the program in its history.

Programming with heavy political undertones began appearing in the gala in the 1990s. As audiences grew, the show became a ritualized event of national significance and experienced increased state involvement in its production. Often, segments of the show became devoted to celebrating the previous year's "national achievements" and a preview of significant events of the upcoming year. In 2008, state media reported that major officials from the Publicity Department of the Chinese Communist Party and the State Administration of Radio, Film, and Television were on scene during the gala's rehearsal to supervise its production. In that same year, a segment featuring migrant workers was inserted into the show on the recommendation of Premier Wen Jiabao.

Throughout the years, officials in charge of propaganda and media control, including Ding Guangen, Li Changchun, and Liu Yunshan, have paid visits to the Chunwan production team. Commenting on the political evolution of the Gala over the years, Takungpao said that Chunwan has evolved from a "year-end tea party" to a "conference for disseminating political propaganda."

=== Imagery of party leadership ===
Beginning in the 1990s, the show has consistently included one segment featuring a video montage of Communist Party leaders accompanied by background music. Shown every year were images of those considered paramount leaders, including Mao Zedong, Deng Xiaoping, Jiang Zemin, and Hu Jintao. In 2007 and 2008, the video footage featured the entire line-up of Politburo Standing Committee members. Between 2011 and 2014, imagery of national leaders were absent from the show, and the amount of political content varied from year to year. For example, the 2011 show featured a rendition of a patriotic song that emphasized Hu Jintao's Harmonious Society and Scientific Development Concept ideologies. In 2012 there was minimal political content, though parts of the show alluded to "building a strong nation" and the 18th Party Congress which was to be held in the fall of that year. The 2014 show, however, was again peppered with political enhancements throughout that paid homage to General Secretary Xi Jinping's "Chinese Dream" ideology, in addition to several nationalistic-themed songs. The 2015 show, reportedly one of the most closely managed affairs in years, prominently featured Xi Jinping's anti-corruption campaign, with three comedy routines being linked to the theme. In addition, in a remarkable departure from convention, the 2015 show also featured Xi Jinping exclusively in a lengthy video montage during an opera-style song entitled "Give my Heart to You". The heavy emphasis on political content continued in 2016; that edition, believed to be one of the most political affairs since the show's inception, saw a return of the more familiar line-up of national leaders. Since 2017, however, the gala has not shown imagery of national leaders, opting instead of showcase various aspects of economic development or nationalist themes.

=== Military ===
The People's Liberation Army is featured in the show's programming every year, usually in the form of a song, although sometimes military-themed sketch comedies have also appeared. Many of the Gala's most prominent singers have a background in the performing arts troupe of the PLA, including Yan Weiwen, Song Zuying, Dong Wenhua and Peng Liyuan.

== Controversies ==
=== Workers Arena lighting effects (1985) ===
In 1985, the gala was held at the Workers Indoor Arena, featuring a live audience scattered throughout the venue. Production staff were not equipped with walkie-talkies, so they improvised their communication with the artists by running around or gesturing from a distance to give cues. This led to the show appearing uncoordinated and exceptionally slow on television; the broadcast lasted over six hours, making it the longest gala on record. The live audience also moved about the arena throughout the event, creating distractions and noise for viewers at home. It also faced strong criticism for its poor lighting effects, which made the stage difficult to see.

=== Chen Peisi sues CCTV distributor (1998) ===
Chen Peisi and his artistic collaborator Zhu Shimao were household names in the 1990s, partly owing to their appearances on the gala. After their hit sketch piece in the 1998 show, a subsidiary of CCTV distributed their performances on VCD without gaining the pair's permission in advance. In 2000, Chen and Zhu sued the subsidiary and won; the court ordered restitution and rescinded their rights to Chen and Zhu's work. Thereafter, Chen and Zhu never appeared on the gala again.

=== Dark three minutes (2007) ===
In the 2007 edition, just before the clock struck midnight, the six hosts of the show assembled on stage suffered a mass breakdown referred to as the "dark three minutes". Zhu Jun, Zhou Tao, Li Yong, Dong Qing, Zhang Zequn and Liu Fangfei collectively started a chain of misread and mistimed lines. Zhang Zequn was the first to read his lines incorrectly, obviously reciting the wrong chunlian, although the audience still applauded. Li Yong then mentioned the transition from the year bingxu (year of the dog) to dinghai (year of the pig) and a greeting to "mother comrades across the country" before being cut off by Zhu Jun's loud declaration that the new year had almost arrived. Liu Fangfei, who was relatively new to the gala, then read a line that was obviously incomplete, followed by seconds of dead air. Zhou Tao tried following it up, only to be interrupted by Li Yong. Zhou then gave Li Yong an annoyed stare, obviously visible as the camera was focused on her. Zhu Jun then interrupted Li Yong again, only to be in turn interrupted by Zhou Tao before the ten-second countdown began. Host Zhang Zequn apologized for the incident on his CCTV blog.

=== Role of women in society (2015) ===
Some observers have criticized the Gala for resisting larger trends in Chinese society, such as the increased role of women in society and changing gender norms. The 2015 skit "Goddesses and Tomboys" (女神和女汉子), led by Jia Ling, faced particular derision online for its portrayal of strong female roles in society and its insensitive depiction of the "sheng nu" phenomenon.

=== Ugly monkey (2016) ===
In 2016, the Gala was criticized for planning to include a "virtual mascot", modeled in 3D based on a painting of a monkey by Han Meilin that was described as "a monster" and "ugly" by many. The digital mascot was also mocked on various Chinese social networks.

=== Blackface (2018) ===
The 2018 edition was criticized for a comedy skit focusing on Africa–China relations, and in particular, China's investments in African railways. The skit featured Chinese actress Lou Naiming wearing blackface and a prosthetic buttocks to portray the mother of an African woman. The woman had asked the host to pose as her husband so she wouldn't be subjected to an arranged date. However, after the host exposed the ruse by introducing her wife, the woman's mother excuses it, declaring her love for China and its people. The skit was ridiculed by viewers and social media, especially among local groups and diaspora, for its invocation of African stereotypes.

=== Absence of pig imagery ===
The 2007 and 2019 editions, despite celebrating the year of the pig in the Chinese zodiac, eschewed nearly all imagery and language invoking pigs. Some suspected this was due to official sensitivities shown towards Muslim minority groups in China (and in the latter case possibly due to an outbreak of African swine fever).

=== Blackface (2021) ===
The 2021 show again featured performers in blackface wearing approximations of African clothing. Like in 2018 it received criticism both within China and internationally. The Chinese foreign ministry responded to criticism by saying that it was not an issue and that anyone saying otherwise must have ulterior motives.

== Directors and performers ==
=== Directors and hosts ===
Year	Date	Director	Presenters	TV ratings* (%)	Multi-screen ratings (%)*	Viewers (Million)
1983	February 12	Huang Yihe	Deng Zaijun, Ma Ji, Jiang Kun, Wang Jingyu, Liu Xiaoqing	N/A	N/A	N/A
1984	February 1	Huang Yihe	Zhang Shufen, Zhao Zhongxiang, Lu Jing, Huang A'yuan, Jiang Kun, Jiang Lili, Chen Sisi	N/A	N/A	N/A
1985	February 19	Huang Yihe	Ma Ji, Jiang Kun, Zhang Yu, Zhu Yuanyi, Ban Ban	N/A	N/A	N/A
1986	February 8	Huang Yihe	Zhao Zhongxiang, Wang Gang, Jiang Kun, Liu Xiaoqing, Fang Shu, Gu Yongfei	N/A	N/A	N/A
1987	January 28	Deng Zaijun	Li Moran, Wang Gang, Li Xiaofen, Jiang Kun	N/A	N/A	N/A
1988	February 16	Deng Zaijun	Sun Daolin, Wang Gang, Jiang Kun, Hou Yaowen, Xue Fei, Wei Hua	N/A	N/A	N/A
1989	February 5	Zhang Xiaohai	Zhang Xiaohai, Li Moran, Zhao Zhongxiang, Jiang Kun, Kan Lijun, Li Yang	N/A	N/A	N/A
1990	January 26	Huang Yihe	Zhao Zhongxiang	N/A	N/A	N/A
1991	February 14	Lang Kun	Zhao Zhongxiang, Hu Miao, Ni Ping, Zhang Hongming, Li Ruiying	N/A	N/A	N/A
1992	February 3	Zhao An	Yang Lan, Zhao Zhongxiang, Ni Ping	N/A	N/A	N/A
1993	January 22	Zhang Ziyang	Liang Yanling, Li Qing'an, Zhang Yongquan, Yang Lan, Zhao Zhongxiang, Ni Ping	N/A	N/A	N/A
1994	February 9	Lang Kun	Ni Ping, Cheng Qian	N/A	N/A	N/A
1995	January 30	Zhao An	Zhao Zhongxiang, Ni Ping, Xu Gehui	N/A	N/A	N/A
1996	February 18	Zhang Xiaohai	Zhao Zhongxiang, Ni Ping; Shanghai - Cheng Qian, Yuan Ming; Xi'an, Shaanxi - Zhang Xiao, Zhou Tao	N/A	N/A	N/A
1997	February 6	Yuan Dewang	Zhao Zhongxiang, Ni Ping, Cheng Qian, Zhou Tao, Zhu Jun, Ya Ning	N/A	N/A	N/A
1998	January 27	Meng Xin	Zhao Zhongxiang, Ni Ping, Zhou Tao, Zhu Jun, Ya Ning, Wang Xuechun	N/A	N/A	N/A
1999	February 15	Liu Tiemin, Huang Xiaohai, Chen Yulu	Zhao Zhongxiang, Ni Ping, Zhou Tao, Zhu Jun	N/A	N/A	N/A
2000	February 4	Zhao An, Zhang Xiaohai	Zhao Zhongxiang, Ni Ping, Zhou Tao, Zhu Jun, Zhao An, Zhao Wei, Zhang Xiaohai, Deric Wan, Brenda Wang, Pu Cunxin, Niu Qun, Feng Gong, Yang Lan, Jiang Kun, Bai Yansong, Wen Qing, Zhao Lin, Cao Ying, Li Xiaomeng, Cui Yongyuan, Wen Xingyu, Ju Ping	N/A	N/A	N/A
2001	January 23	Wang Xianping, Wang Xiansheng, Jin Yue	Zhu Jun, Zhou Tao, Zhang Zheng, Cao Ying	33.2	N/A	638
2002	February 11	Chen Yulu	Ni Ping, Zhu Jun, Zhou Tao, Li Yong, Wang Xiaoya, Wen Qing; Shenzhen, Guangdong - Cao Ying, Zhang Zheng	35.1	N/A	N/A
2003	January 31	Jin Yue	Ni Ping, Zhu Jun, Zhou Tao, Li Yong	33.8	N/A	N/A
2004	January 21	Yuan Dewang	Ni Ping, Zhu Jun, Zhou Tao, Li Yong	36.4	N/A	N/A
2005	February 8	Lang Kun	Zhu Jun, Zhou Tao, Li Yong, Dong Qing	37.6	N/A	N/A
2006	January 28	Lang Kun	Zhu Jun, Zhou Tao, Li Yong, Dong Qing, Zhang Zequn, Liu Fangfei	31.7	N/A	N/A
2007	February 17	Jin Yue	Zhu Jun, Zhou Tao, Li Yong, Dong Qing, Zhang Zequn, Liu Fangfei	31.4	N/A	N/A
2008	February 6	Chen Linchun, Zhang Xiaohai	Zhu Jun, Zhou Tao, Li Yong, Dong Qing, Zhang Zequn, Liu Fangfei, Bai Yansong	32.4	N/A	N/A
2009	January 25	Lang Kun	Zhu Jun, Zhou Tao, Dong Qing, Zhang Zequn, Bai Yansong, Zhu Xun	34.8	N/A	N/A
2010	February 13	Jin Yue	Zhu Jun, Zhou Tao, Dong Qing, Zhang Zequn, Ren Luyu, Ouyang Xiadan	30.9	N/A	N/A
2011	February 2	Chen Linchun, Ma Dong, Liu Gang	Zhu Jun, Zhou Tao, Dong Qing, Li Yong, Zhang Zequn, Zhu Xun	31.0	N/A	N/A
2012	January 22	Ha Wen	Zhu Jun, Li Yong, Dong Qing, Bi Fujian, Sa Beining, Li Sisi	32.8	N/A	770
2013	February 9	Ha Wen	Zhu Jun, Li Yong, Dong Qing, Bi Fujian, Sa Beining, Li Sisi	31.2	N/A	750
2014	January 30	Feng Xiaogang	Zhu Jun, Dong Qing, Bi Fujian, Li Sisi, Zhang Guoli	30.9	33.15	705
2015	February 18	Ha Wen	Zhu Jun, Dong Qing, Kang Hui, Li Sisi, Sa Beining, Zhu Xun, Bi Fujian, Negmat Rahman	*28.37	29.60	690
2016	February 7	Lü Yitao	Zhu Jun, Dong Qing, Zhou Tao, Li Sisi, Sa Beining, Negmat Rahman; Xi'an, Shaanxi - Zhu Xun, Xu Jie (Shaanxi Broadcast Corporation, SXBC); Guangzhou, Guangdong - Ren Luyu, Deng Lu (Guangdong Radio and Television, GRT); Quanzhou, Fujian - Li Jiaming, Zhao Linshuo (Quanzhou TV); Hulunbuir, Inner Mongolia - Ma Yue, Ourentuya (Inner Mongolia TV, NMTV)	*N/A	30.98	1033
2017	January 27	Yang Dongsheng	Beijing - Zhu Jun, Dong Qing, Negmat Rahman, Kang Hui, Zhu Xun; Liangshan, Sichuan - Yang Fan, Ahore-Ri (Sichuan Radio & Television, SRT); Shanghai - Meng Shengnan, Cao Kefan (Shanghai Meida Group, SMG); Guilin, Guangxi - Zhang Lei, Gao Feng (Guangxi Television, GXTV); Harbin, Heilongjiang - Guan Tong, Zhou Wei (Heilongjiang Television, HLJTV)	*N/A	30.88	*N/A
2018	February 15	Yang Dongsheng	Beijing - Kang Hui, Zhu Xun, Ren Luyu, Li Sisi, Negmat Rahman; Sanya, Hainan - Zhang Zequn, Wang Si (Hainan Television); Qiandongnan, Guizhou - Ma Yue, Dou Aili (Guizhou Television, GTV); Tai'an and Qufu, Shandong - Li Jiaming, Li Yi (Shandong Television, SDTV); Zhuhai, Guangdong - Yang Fan, Gui Jiachen (Zhuhai Television, ZHTV)			1,131
2019	February 4	Liu Zhen	Beijing - Kang Hui, Zhu Xun, Ren Luyu, Li Sisi, Negmat Rahman; Jinggangshan, Jiangxi - Zhang Yu, Yin Song (Jiangxi Television, JTV); Changchun, Jilin - Zhang Zequn, Yang Fan (Jilin Television); Shenzhen, Guangdong - Yang Fan, Pangwei (Shenzhen Media Group, SZMG)		30.07	1,173
2020	January 24	Yang Dongsheng	Beijing - Ren Luyu, Negmat Rahman, Tong Liya, Yin Song, Zhang Shuyue; Zhengzhou - Zhang Zequn, Ma Yue, Pang Xiaoge, Mi Na; Guangdong-Hong Kong-Macau Greater Bay Area - Myolie Wu, Daniel Liu, Xu Lunan			
2021	February 11	Chen Linchun	Ren Luyu, Negmat Rahman, Li Sisi, Long Yang, Zhang Tao			
2022	January 31	Liu Zhen	Ren Luyu, Negmat Rahman, Li Sisi, Sa Beining, Ma Fanshu			
2023	January 21	Yu Lei	Ren Luyu, Negmat Rahman, Ma Fanshu, Long Yang, Sa Beining, Wang Jianing			
2024	February 9	Yu Lei	Ren Luyu, Negmat Rahman, Ma Fanshu, Long Yang, Sa Beining			
2025	January 28	Yu Lei	Ren Luyu, Negmat Rahman, Ma Fanshu, Long Yang, Sa Beining			
2026	February 16	Yu Lei	Ren Luyu, Negmat Rahman, Ma Fanshu, Long Yang, Sa Beining			
2027	February 5	Yu Lei	TBA			

=== Notes for rating and viewers data ===
- 2001–2014 Data source: CSM Media Research.

=== Recurring Performers ===
As the program is one of the most watched programs in China, a performance in the New Year's Gala has been considered a starting point into a major career.

The following is a list of people who have gained their fame largely from their performances at the Gala, or whose names have become frequently associated with the Gala through the years. This list is not to be confused with the "guest stars" list below, which identifies celebrities who were famous in their own right prior to their appearance at the Gala. These individuals have been part of the Gala's long history, and are very much the people that many viewers remember from past editions.

- Zhao Benshan; Gao Xiumin; Fan Wei; – skits, 1990s – 2010s; Xiaoshenyang – 2009
- Song Dandan; Chen Peisi; Zhu Shimao – skits, 1990s
- Guo Da, Cai Ming, Pan Changjiang, Huang Hong, Guo Donglin, Gong Hanlin – skits, 1990s – 2010s
- Jia Ling – skits, 2010s – 2020s
- Feng Gong and Niu Qun – xiangsheng, 1990s – 2000s (decade)
- Ma Ji, Jiang Kun – xiangsheng
- Dashan (stage name of Canadian Mark Rowswell), gained his fame through the Gala, 1990s – 2010s
- Song Zuying, Peng Liyuan, Dong Wenhua, Mao Amin, Zhang Ye, Han Lei, Jiang Dawei, Yan Weiwen, Yin Xiumei; folk and opera singers, 1990s – 2010s
- Li Guyi, usually the performer of the last segment of the evening, "Nanwang Jinxiao" ("Tonight is Unforgettable")

=== Guest appearances ===
These performers have made appearances at the Gala. They are listed by alphabetical order (by their last name, or if they perform under an artistic name, by that name) based on the common name they are known by internationally.

- A-do (duet with Zhao Wei in 2004)
- Abao (2006, 2014)
- Alilang Group, singing Doraji (2009)
- Angelababy (2019)
- Ayanga (2016, 2019, 2020, 2021)
- Attraction (2014)
- Bai Lu (2025, 2026)
- Bi Wenjun (2026)
- Cai Chengyu (2020, 2022)
- Danny Chan (2009)
- Eason Chan (2009, 2012, 2025)
- Jackie Chan (1989; 1993; 2005; 2009; 2014; 2017, 2018, 2019, 2020, 2021, 2023, 2026)
- William Chan (2017–2020)
- Angela Chang (2007; 2008; 2020)
- Jeff Chang (2017)
- Chang Chen (2015)
- Kelly Chen (2019)
- Chen Kun (2012; 2020)
- Cheng Xiao (2025)
- Charlene Choi (2017)
- Steve Chou (2026)
- Cosmic Girls (2017)
- Cui Yongyuan (1998; 2006; 2013)
- Jay Chou (2008; 2009; 2011; 2018)
- Celine Dion (2013)
- Dilraba Dilmurat (2019, 2026)
- Dimash Kudaibergen (2018, 2023, 2025)
- Fan Chengcheng (2026)
- Fei Xiang (1987, 2012)
- Fei Yu-Ching (2008, 2019)
- Fire of Anatolia (2013)
- Fu Yuanhui (2017)
- G.E.M. (2015; 2017)
- Curley G (2025, 2026)
- Guan Xiaotong (2017; 2019; 2021)
- Guo Degang (2013)
- Guo Junchen (2026)
- Hao Ge (2007, 2008)
- Han Geng (2011)
- Han Hong (2007; 2011; 2017)
- Hou Dejian (1988)
- Hou Minghao (2025)
- Hou Yong (2016)
- Lars Huang (2025, 2026)
- Huang Shengyi (2008)
- Valen Hsu (2016)
- Hua Chenyu (2014)
- Huang Bo (2014; 2018)
- Huang Xiaoming (2018–2020)
- Hu Ge (2016; 2017)
- Richie Jen (1999)
- Jiang Xin (2017)
- Jing Boran (2017)
- Ju Jingyi (2020)
- Khalil Fong (2011)
- Leon Lai (2000)
- Lang Lang (2013; 2015; 2020)
- Liang Qiqi (2008)
- Andy Lau (1995; 1998; 2006; 2015; 2021)
- Carina Lau (2020)
- Coco Lee (2001; 2014; 2017)
- Hacken Lee (2017)
- Jam Hsiao (2011)
- Lee Min-ho (2014)
- John Legend (2026)
- Gigi Leung (2016)
- Li Jian (2011)
- Li Ronghao (2020)
- Li Qin (2026)
- Li Xian (2020, 2025, 2026)
- Li Yifeng (2019)
- Li Yuchun (2015; 2020; 2025)
- Li Yundi (2001; 2012; 2013)
- Li Yunrui (2026)
- Lin Chi-ling (2011, 2019)
- Ruby Lin (1998, 2016)
- Terry Lin (2019)
- JJ Lin (2006; 2017)
- Liu Hegang (2008)
- Liu Huan (2020)
- Liu Tao (2015, 2016, 2017; 2019; 2020)
- Liu Xiao Ling Tong (1992)
- Liu Yuning (2025, 2026)
- Show Lo (2020)
- Lu Chen (2009; 2010; 2012; 2013; 2019)
- Lu Jihong (2011)
- Lu Han (2017)
- Ma Sichun (2020, 2025)
- Ma Tianyu (2017)
- Maksim Mrvica (2018)
- Sophie Marceau (2014)
- Mao Buyi (2025, 2026)
- Mao Xiaotong (2025, 2026)
- Karen Mok (2015, 2025)
- Warren Mok (2015; 2020)
- Wu Muye (2018)
- Na Ying (1992, 1993; 1995–1998; 2000, 2001; 2005; 2013; 2015; 2018)
- Ouyang Nana (2026)
- OneRepublic (2025)
- Pang Long (2006; 2007; 2008)
- Eddie Peng (2020)
- Phoenix Legend (2008; 2013; 2015–2017; 2019; 2020, 2025, 2026)
- Qiao Xin (2017)
- Qin Lan (2026)
- Ren Yueli (2011)
- Lionel Richie (2026)
- Ronan Parke (2013)
- S.H.E (2008; 2013)
- Fiona Sit (2025, 2026)
- Song Zu'er (2020)
- Sun Nan (2012–2014; 2019; 2020)
- Tan Songyun (2026)
- David Tao (2007; 2015)
- T-ara (2015)
- TFBoys (2016–2020)
- Jolin Tsai (2005; 2007)
- Mike Tsang (2025, 2026)
- Nicholas Tse (2000)
- Twins (2006)
- Wang Churan (2026)
- Jackson Wang (2020)
- Wang Kai (2017; 2018)
- Wang Leehom (2003; 2010; 2012; 2013)
- Silence Wang (2023, 2024, 2025, 2026)
- Wang Xingyue (2025)
- Wang Yibo (2021, 2025, 2026)
- Wang Ziwen (2017)
- Wanting (2013)
- Westlife (2026)
- Faye Wong (1998; 2010; 2011; 2012; 2018; 2025, 2026)
- Wu Jing (2018)
- Xiao Hu Dui (1992; 2013)
- Xiao Zhan (2020)
- Joker Xue (2025)
- Yan Tiexin (2011)
- Aska Yang (2019)
- Yang Yang (duet with Tong Tiexin sing “Father and Son” (父子) in 2016, 2018)
- Yang Zi (2017; 2018; 2019; 2020; 2023)
- Yao Beina (2007; 2010; 2014)
- Jackson Yee (2025, 2026)
- Sally Yeh (1996)
- Donnie Yen (2016)
- Frances Yip (1987)
- Yisa Yu (2019)
- Yue Yunpeng (2014; 2015; 2017; 2019; 2020)
- Yuqi (2025)
- Joey Yung (2005; 2007; 2009; 2010; 2011; 2019)
- Jane Zhang (2026)
- Jason Zhang (2017; 2019, 2026)
- Lay Zhang (2017–21; 25)
- Zhang Ruonan (2026)
- Zhang Ruoyun (2020, 2022, 2023, 2024, 2026)
- Zhang Zifeng (2025)
- Zhang Ziyi (2000; 2001; 2008)
- Zhao Wei (2000; 2004; 2016)
- Zhou Dongyu (2019; 2020)
- Charlie Zhou Shen (2021; 2023; 2024; 2025; 2026)
- Zhu Yilong (2020)
- Members of the Chinese Space Program (2007–2009, 2017)
- 2008 also featured a poem dedicated to the victims of the 2008 Chinese winter storms with it being performed by eminent performers, including Li Ruiying, Kang Hui, Pu Cunxin, Wang Gang, Chen Daoming, Jiang Wen, Han Lei, Wei Wei and Zhang Guoli. 2020 included a tribute to the COVID-19 victims and medical staff, read out by Bai Yansong, Kang Hui, Shui Junyi, He Hongmei, Hai Xia, and Ouyang Xiadan
- Then-United Nation Secretary-General Ban Ki-moon appeared in a New Year's greeting in 2016.

== See also ==
- CCSTV New Year's Gala
- Dick Clark's New Year's Rockin' Eve
- Gặp nhau cuối năm
- Little Blue Light
