= Huang Yihe =

Chinese television director (1934–2019)

Huang Yihe (Chinese: 黄一鹤; April 1934 – 8 April 2019) was a Chinese television director who created the CCTV New Year's Gala in 1983. The program has become the world's most-watched TV show, with one billion viewers in 2018.

== Biography ==
Huang was born in April 1934 in Shenyang, Liaoning, China. In 1949, he enlisted in the People's Liberation Army as a military entertainer. A year later, his unit was dispatched to North Korea to perform for Chinese troops fighting in the Korean War. After his entertainment unit was disbanded, he was discharged from the military and assigned to work for China Central Television.

In the early 1980s, Huang proposed the idea of hosting a televised party to celebrate the Chinese New Year, and the first CCTV New Year's Gala aired in 1983. Operating on a very low budget, Huang was given a studio of 600 square metres (6,500 sq ft), which could accommodate only 60 staff members and 200 guests. With no money for recording and editing, the show was improvised and broadcast live, and the studio had four telephones accepting live requests from callers nationwide. The popular singer Li Guyi ended the night with nine performances, and the comedian Jiang Kun, who co-hosted the show, performed three pieces of xiangsheng. Huang and his colleagues at CCTV took considerable political risk broadcasting the live show, as pop singers such as Li Guyi were at the time under attack by hardliners as "spiritual pollution" and one of her most popular songs, Hometown Love (乡恋), was still officially banned. When the song received numerous phone requests, Huang sought permission from Wu Lengxi, the Minister of Radio and Television who was in the audience. Wu gave the go-ahead after much deliberation, and Li Guyi performed the song for the first time on national TV.

After the first New Year Gala proved a huge hit with viewers nationwide, Huang was tasked with directing the second edition in 1984. At the time, China and Britain were under intense negotiation over the Sino-British Joint Declaration on the status of Hong Kong. Huang came up with the idea of inviting the amateur Hong Kong singer Cheung Ming-man to perform at his show. It was then unprecedented for a Hong Kong entertainer to perform on Chinese TV and his request met significant resistance. Huang persistently lobbied government officials and eventually gained their approval. Cheung's performance of the patriotic song "My Chinese Heart" at the 1984 gala made him a household name in China.

Huang went on to direct three more editions of the New Year's Gala, in 1985, 1986, and 1990. The annual show has since become a new tradition for Chinese New Year. The program is now the most-watched TV show in the world, with a billion viewers in 2018.

Huang died on 8 April 2019 in Beijing, at the age of 85.
