= Long Yang =

Chinese television presenter

- 龙洋
- Born: December 17, 1989 (age 36); Chenzhou, Hunan, China
- Occupation: television presenter
- Years active: 2009-present
- Notable work: The hostess of financial informative program Time No.1 on CCTV-2
- Television: Time No.1

Chinese name
- Simplified Chinese: 龙洋
- Traditional Chinese: 龍洋
Transcriptions
Standard Mandarin
- Hanyu Pinyin: Lóng Yáng

Long Yang (Chinese: 龙洋; pinyin: Lóng Yáng; born December 17, 1989) is a Chinese television hostess for China Central Television. She is from Chenzhou, Hunan, China. In 2009, she made her debut as a contestant on host show I am the master on screen and got into Top 48. In 2013, she competed in hosts' dance show Dance Nanjing and became the winner.

In 2015, she began to host financial informative program Time No.1 on CCTV-2.

== Career ==
In July 2009, Long Yang competed in the host show I am the master on screen. She finished in the Top 48.

In 2011, Long Yang became a hostess. She hosted in news program Live Nanjing on Nanjing Television after graduating from Nanjing University of the Arts. In June 2012, she hosted her own talk show:Long Yang's Talk Show on Nanjing Television.

In February 2013, she competed in hosts' dance show Dance Nanjing and won the championship. In August 2013, she competed in Super Speaker on Anhui Television and got into Top 16.

In January 2014, she hosted 2014 Spring Festival Gala of Cities with Yang Lan.

In 2015, Long Yang got into CCTV and began to host financial informative program Time No.1. In this program, she hosts a talk show named Morning Talk Show. On the Chinese New Year's Eve of 2016, Long Yang hosted the CCTV Spring Festival Gala and a program related to it:@Spring Festival Gala with Wen Jin.

== Discography ==
=== TV programs ===
Program name	Year	TV station	References
Flowers Ting	2010	Qinghai Television	
Everyday Low Carbon	2010	Qinghai Television	
Live Nanjing	2011	Nanjing television	
Long Yang's Talk Show	2012	Nanjing Television	
Time No.1	2015–present	CCTV-2	
Surprise Gift	2015	CCTV-2	
CCTV Spring Festival Gala	2016	CCTV	

=== Speeches ===
Speech subject	Time	References
"女汉子的人生智慧"	August 15, 2013	
"电视台的那些事"	September 26, 2013	
"剩女"	October 24, 2013	

== Awards ==
On February 3, 2013, Long Yang won the championship of host show Dance Nanjing.
