= Decreed by Fate =

- Official poster
- Genre: Romance, Comedy, Costume
- Directed by: Liu Chun
- Starring: Li Jiu Lin; Chen Fang Tong; Wu Chong Xuan
- Country of origin: China
- Original language: Mandarin
- No. of episodes: 12

Production
- Production locations: Hengdian, China
- Production companies: 杭州传影文化传媒有限公司 金海鸥传媒 爱奇艺文学 映美传媒 麦奇影视 星合尚世 祜莱影业

Original release
- Network: iQIYI
- Release: 31 March 2022

Decreed By Fate (Chinese: 千金难逃), is a 2022 Chinese comedy romance costume series, starring Li Jiu Lin, Chen Fang Tong, and Wu Cheng Xu. The full series was released on 31 March 2022 on IQIYI and is also available on iQiyi app and iQ.com.

== Synopsis ==
Ye Rong Er, the "female Zhang Fei" of Lianwang County, who no one dared to bother, married Yin Sishen, the marquis of Jing'an, who she has never met before. In order to solve her divorce lawsuit, Ye Rong Er decided to become a first-class matchmaker, thus setting up Boqing Inn, to break up marriages and solve cases every day. At the same time, Ye Rong Er discovered that the two first-level matchmaker who joined Boqing Inn approached her with ulterior motives. What surprised her even more was that her "husband" Yin Sishen, who had escaped the marriage, seemed to be hiding between the two.

== Cast ==
=== Main ===
- Li Jiu Lin as Lu Ting Xiao/Yin Sishen
- Chen Fang Tong as Ye Rong Er/ "Zhang Fei"
- Wu Cheng Xu as Fang Xian Xun

=== Supporting ===
- Salmon Xu as Wang Yi Zhi
- Xu Ning as Zheng Lin
- Chen Yu Feng as Liu Zhan
- Wu Hao as Zhang Jiu
- Wang Hong Qian as Yue Li Weng
- Jiang Rui Ze as Qin Yi Yi
- Hu Dong Qing as Lu Ru Yi
- Tian Feng as Hong Yuan Shan

== Production ==
The series began filming on 27 May 2021 in Hengdian, China.
