= Ha Wen =

Chinese television director

Ha Wen (Chinese: 哈文; born April 13, 1969) is a Chinese television producer and director of Hui heritage.

== Biography ==
Ha was born in Wuzhong, Ningxia; her father came from Benxi, Liaoning province. She works for China Central Television (CCTV) and is most famous for directing the CCTV New Year's Gala in 2012, 2014, and 2015. Ha graduated from the Communication University of China in 1991, and began working for CCTV in 1995. Ha directed the March 15 Consumer Rights Day programmes from 1996 to 2003. She was the wife of Li Yong, the former host of the CCTV show Lucky 52 and also a New Year's Gala host. They wed in 1992, and have a daughter, Fatima, born in 2002.
