= Ma Dong =

Chinese television producer (born 1968)

Ma Dong (simplified Chinese: 马东; traditional Chinese: 馬東; pinyin: Mǎ Dōng; born December 25, 1968) is a Chinese producer, director, host, and son of xiangsheng comedian Ma Ji.

== Biography ==
Born in Heilongjiang and raised in Beijing, Ma went to Australia at the age of 18 to study computer science. He worked in the IT industry and lived in Australia for eight years, during which he obtained permanent residency. In 1994, he returned to China, and in 1995, he enrolled in the Management Department of the Beijing Film Academy, earning his second degree.

Ma gained recognition for hosting Hunan TV's talk show You Hua Hao Shuo (有话好说) (1999–2000), which featured China's first TV interview with gay people and was shut down for it. He then worked for China Central Television from 2001 to 2013, where he hosted programs such as Tiaozhan Zhuchiren (挑战主持人) and Wenhua Fangtanlu (文化访谈录) and directed the language programs for the 2011 CCTV Spring Festival Gala.

After leaving the CCTV, Ma has gained popularity among the younger generation for his online shows, notably I Can I BB (2014–2021). He served as iQIYI's chief content officer (2013–2015) before establishing his own production company Mewe Media in 2015.

== Personal life ==
Ma's wife is Peng Xiaosheng, a former producer and director for Hunan TV’s talk show You Hua Hao Shuo. The two met and fell in love while working together. In 2001, when Ma moved to Beijing to further his career, Peng resigned from her position at Hunan TV and followed him to Beijing. The couple married in 2004. In 2008, their daughter Ma Sula was born in Beijing.
