= Zhou Tao =

Chinese television host and actress (born 1968)

- 周涛
- Born: 23 March 1968 (age 58); Huainan, Anhui, China
- Education: Communication University of China
- Occupations: Host; actress
- Years active: 1993–present
- Television: China Central Television (CCTV)
- Spouse(s): Yao Ke (divorced); Lu Yun
- Awards: Das Erste – Golden Crown for Best Host; 1999; 1st Golden Mike Award; 1999; 4th Golden Mike Award; 2003; Golden Eagle Award for Best Programme Host; 2003

Chinese name
- Traditional Chinese: 周濤
- Simplified Chinese: 周涛
Transcriptions
Standard Mandarin
- Hanyu Pinyin: Zhōu Tāo

Zhou Tao (Chinese: 周涛; born 23 March 1968) is a Chinese television host and actress.

She won the Das Erste Golden Crown for Best Host in 1999, the Golden Mike Awards for Television in 1999 and 2003, and received the Golden Eagle Award for Best Programme Host in 2003.

== Biography ==
Zhou was born in Huainan, Anhui, China in 1968. She graduated from Communication University of China, where she majored in broadcast.

From 1993 to 1995, Zhou worked in Beijing Television, hosting Beijing News.

From 1995 to present, Zhou worked as a host at China Central Television.

Zhou hosted the CCTV New Year's Gala from 1996 to 2011 and 2016.

== Works ==
=== Television ===
- True Love Forever (真情无限)

=== Film ===
Year	English title	Chinese title	Role	Cast	Notes
2001	The Marriage Certificate	谁说我不在乎	guest	Feng Gong, Lü Liping, Li Xiaomeng	
2004	Sunny Court Yard	阳光天井	guest	Huang Hong, Guo Da, Li Mingqi, Chen Jianbin	
2013	Better and Better	越来越好之村晚	guest	Aaron Kwok, Sandra Ng, Xu Jinglei, Tong Dawei, Wang Luodan	
2019	Mao Zedong 1949	决胜时刻	Song Meiling		

== Awards ==
- 1999 Das Erste – Golden Crown for Best Host
- 1999 Golden Mike Award
- 2003 Golden Mike Award
- 2003 Golden Eagle Award for Best Programme Host

== Personal life ==
Zhou is twice married. She was originally wed to Yao Ke (姚科), who is a host in China National Radio. After a turbulent divorce, she remarried Lu Yun (路云), her second husband, a businessman.
