= Super Speaker =

Chinese television series

This is about the first season.

Anhui TV Production	
Style	Speech
Director	Cao Zhixiong
Host	Yu Sheng
Judges	Le Jia, Chen Luyu, Li Yong, Jimmy Lin
Area	People's Republic of China
Language	Mandarin
Slogan	Speaking Is Also Better Than Singing
No. Of Episodes	13
Number of Seasons	2
Running Time	90 minutes per episode

Super Speaker is a TV show produced by Anhui TV in 2013.

== Members of Le Jia Group ==
Ye Zihan, Chen Zhou, Cui Yongping, Li He, Yang Xinglong, Li Chengyuan

Among all the members, none of them left the competition when sent out against members of other judges. Cui Yongping succeeded in the inter-group competitions and claimed the champion's place.

== Members of Li Yong Group ==
Tang Bi, Chen Ming, Xie Yi, Suan Suan, Ji Jianjing, Cao Qingwan

Tang Bi, Ji Jianjing and Suan Suan were eliminated in the competition in which they were against other members. Cao Qingwan reached the highest of her group, claiming the runner-up position.

== Members of Jimmy Lin Group ==
Huang Chengcheng, Xu Haojie, Huang Xiaoshan, Han Lengna, Da Wang

Han Lengna and Da Wang were eliminated in the second speech. Xu Haojie bet Huang Xiaoshan when both of them received votes and went to speed-talk round. Xu Haojie later made it to the third place.

== Members of Chen Luyu Group ==
Chen Wenya, Guan Bing, Long Yang, Li Ning*, Huang Xiaopang, Li Lin

Guan Bing was eliminated first. Li Lin would claim the fourth place.

- Li Ning was qualified after no more competitors were left, so Luyu chose Li Ning to fill up the gap.
