= Story of Spring =

"The Story of Spring" (Chinese: 春天的故事; pinyin: Chūntiān de Gùshì) is a patriotic Chinese song praising Chinese leader Deng Xiaoping, although it never mentions him by name. Originally sung by famous Chinese folk singer Dong Wenhua, Deng is referred to as "an old man" throughout the song. Its two verses allude to Deng's economic reform policies and their success from its inception in spring 1978 to his southern tour in spring 1992, when the song was created.

The song was first performed during a television gala in 1994. The song was widely played during the 1990s and is now a familiar tune to most Chinese people living on the mainland. It was especially widely played following Deng's death and was a feature performance at the 1997 CCTV New Year's Gala.

== External reference ==
- The Story of Spring on Yinyuetai
