= Abao =

Chinese folk singer from Shanxi

Zhang Shaochun (Chinese: 张少淳, born 27 February 1969), known professionally as Abao (Chinese: 阿宝), is a Chinese folk singer from Shanxi. He first came to prominence as the winner of the CCTV talent contest Xingguang Dadao ('Star Road') in 2005, and became one of the best-known folk singers from the northwest of China.

== Early life ==
Abao was born in the outskirts of Datong, Shanxi on 27 February 1969. He began singing when he was four, influenced by a local folk singer although he had no formal training. Apart from Shanxi folk songs, he also learned to sing other folk songs, including songs of Shaanbei from neighbouring Shaanxi. He enrolled at Datong Arts School when he was twelve, and graduated in 1986.

== Career ==
After graduating, at the age of 17, he began to sing in a music bar in Datong, later joining a travelling troupe, singing at weddings and other occasions in villages around the country. He sang in a variety of genre including pop, rock and folk.

In 2004, Abao was performing in Beijing when he was spotted by a producer of a TV show. He was placed in folk-singing competition Xibu Mingge Diansi Dasai ( 西部民歌电视大赛) organized by CCTV, for which he received a bronze prize. Following his appearance on the show, he released a CD, self-titled Abao. He then entered the first season of the singing contest Xingguang Dadao. In the final in 2005, he performed "The Wild Lilies Bloom a Brilliant Red" (山丹丹开花红艳艳, Shandandan kaihua hongyanyan), and won the contest, beating the duo Phoenix Legend.

After winning the title, Abao performed regularly on television for many years, including the 2006 CCTV New Year's Gala. He released his second album in 2006. He has also appeared as a judge on various television shows, including Xingguang Dadao. In 2013, Abao participated in the Chinese reality television show Splash!.

== Performance style ==
Abao has a wide vocal range, and sings in a distinctive high-pitched voice. His style of singing is a mix of folk styles of Shanxi, Mongolia, and in particular the Xintianyou style of Shaanxi. Abao typically performs dressed as a peasant from Shaanxi, wearing a sheepskin jerkin with black pants, and a white towel knotted on his head.

Although he is not from northern Shaanxi but neighbouring Shanxi, he became best known for the Xintianyou style of folk songs of Shaanxi, and was called the "Xintianyo Song King" (信天游歌王, xintianyou gewang). However, he has been criticised by folk song experts for not being authentic in his vocal technique and style. Nevertheless, his popularity changed the flavours of those folk songs performed by other folk singers, a process described as the "Abao phenomenon" by a scholar.

== Discography ==
- Abao《阿宝》(2005)
- Xiang qinqin xiang zai xinyan yanshang《想亲亲想在心眼眼上》(2006)
- Lei dandan《泪蛋蛋》(2012)
- Nongye zhongjinshu 《农业重金属》(2014)

=== Songs ===
- 为你跑成罗圈腿
