= Zhu Jun (host) =

Chinese host and actor (born 1964)

- 朱军
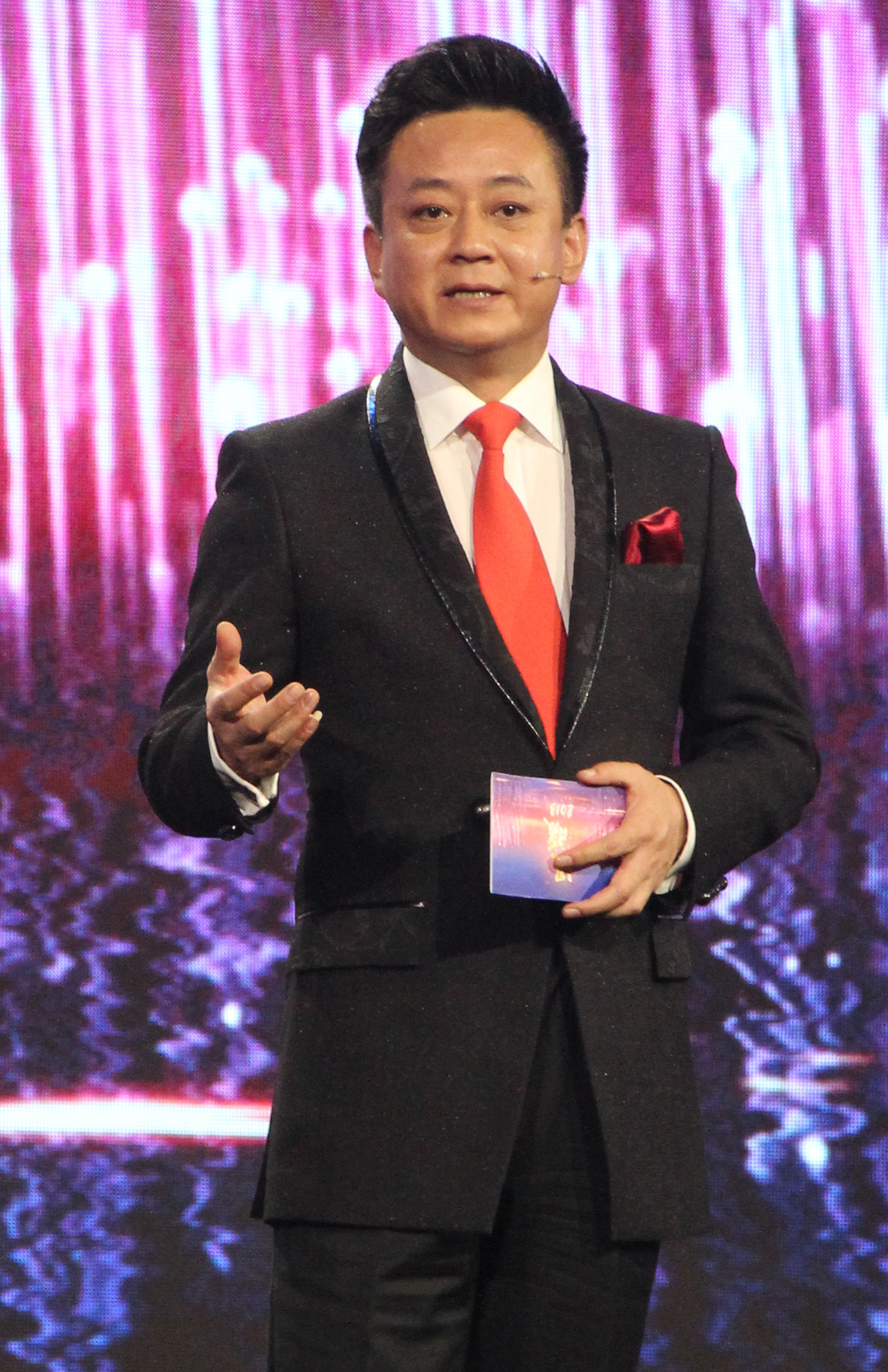
- Zhu in 2013
- Born: 26 April 1964 (age 62); Lanzhou, Gansu, China
- Other name: Deon Zhu
- Education: Peking University
- Occupations: Host; actor
- Years active: 1996–present
- Television: China Central Television (CCTV)
- Spouse: Tan Mei (m. 1993)
- Children: 1
- Awards: Golden Mike Award; 1999; Golden Mike Award; 2003; Golden Eagle Award for Best Programme Host; 2003

Zhu Jun (also Deon Zhu) (simplified Chinese: 朱军; traditional Chinese: 朱軍; pinyin: Zhū Jūn; born 26 April 1964) is a Chinese host and actor. Zhu was a member of the 11th National Committee of the Chinese People's Political Consultative Conference, a member of 8th National Committee of the China Federation of Literary and Art Circles, and a member of 10th National Committee of the All-China Youth Federation.

He won the Golden Mike Award's for Television in 1999 and 2003, and received Golden Eagle Award for Best Programme Host in 2003.

== Biography ==
Zhu was born in Lanzhou, Gansu in 1964, with his ancestral home in Luoyang, Henan, with his father an artist in Lanzhou Military Region.

At the age of 11, Zhu studied xiangsheng, sketch comedy, kuaiban under his father.

In October 1981, Zhu joined the People's Liberation Army and served four years.

From September 1985 to September 1988, Zhu worked in Gansu Song and Dance Troupe. From September 1988 to March 1996, Zhu worked in Lanzhou Military Region.

Zhu joined the China Central Television from March 1996 to February 2017.

Zhu hosted the CCTV New Year's Gala from February 1997 to January 2017.

== Sexual assault allegations and #MeToo in China ==
In the summer of 2018, during the Chinese version of the #MeToo movement, Zhu was accused of sexual harassment on the popular Chinese social media platform Weibo.

Zhou Xiaoxuan, a screenwriter in Beijing known in China under her nickname Xianzi (弦子), stated in 2018, when she was 25 years old, that Zhu had assaulted her in his dressing room in 2014. In August 2018, Zhu filed a lawsuit against Zhou, who subsequently countersued. Zhou also reported the incident to the Chinese police, who advised her to drop the issue over concern of endangering the jobs of her parents in civil service and a state-owned firm.

On December 2, 2020, the Haidian District People's Court held formal evidentiary hearing on sexual harassment case against Zhu Jun. On 14 September 2021, after the second hearing, the court ruled that Zhou's harassment claim against Zhu did not meet the standard of proof to proceed.

== Works ==
=== Television ===
- Artistic Life (艺术人生)
- Music Life (音乐人生)

=== Sketch comedy ===
Year	Chinese title	English title	Cast	Ref.
2004	让一让，生活真美好	Deon is Beautiful	Feng Gong, Zhou Tao, Li Zhiqiang, Liu Jinshan	
2005	笑谈人生	We Together a Byword to Life	Feng Gong	
2006	跟着媳妇当保姆	Be a Dry-nurse with My Wife	Feng Gong, Niu Li	

== Awards ==
- 1999 Golden Mike Award
- 2003 Golden Mike Award
- 2003 Golden Eagle Award for Best Programme Host

== Personal life ==
In May 1993, Zhu married Tan Mei (谭梅), who is a Chinese dancer. The couple has a son Zhu Sitan (朱思潭).
