= Zhou Xiaoxuan =

Chinese screenwriter and activist

- 周晓璇
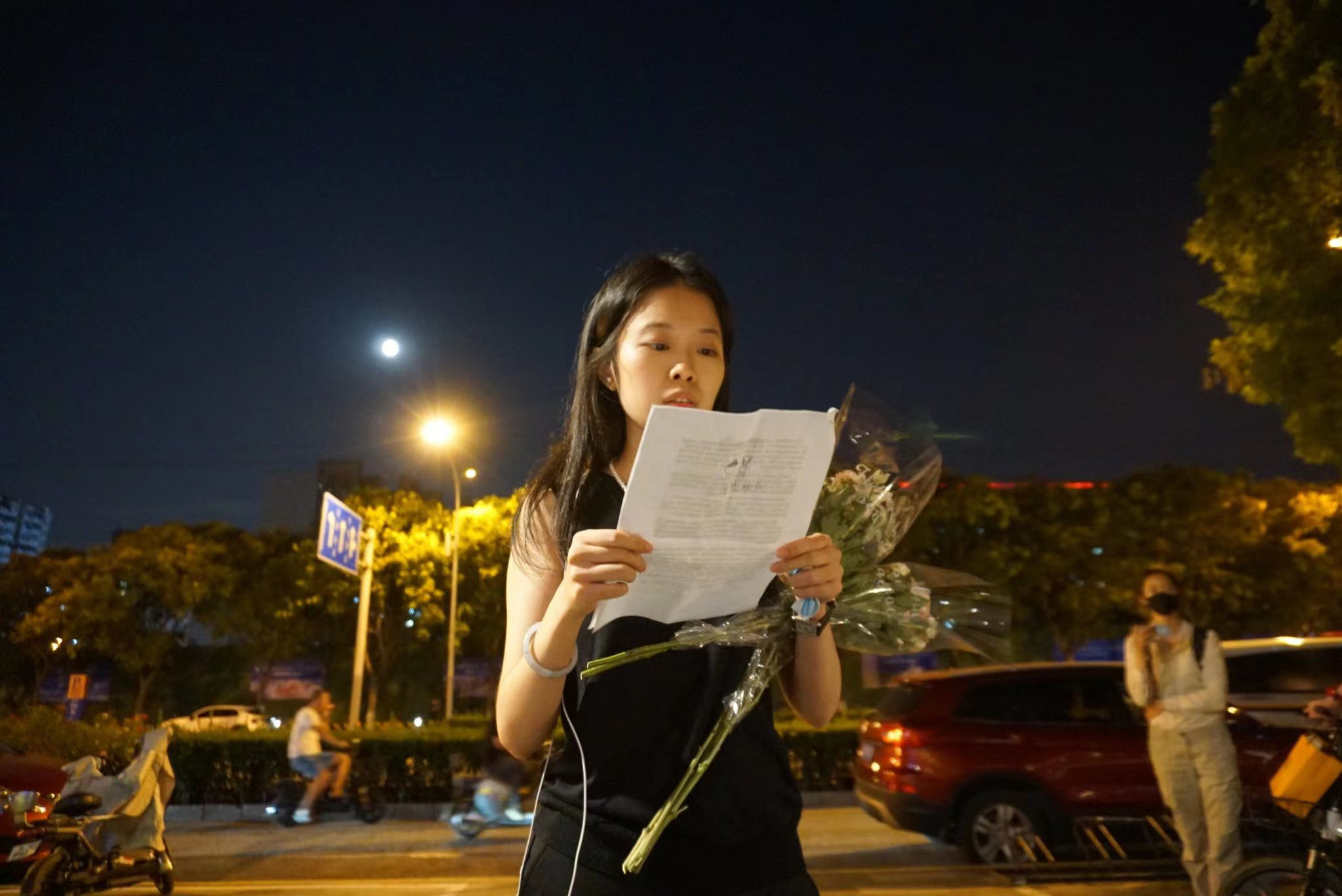
- Zhou in 2022
- Born: 1992 or 1993 (age 32–33); Wuhan
- Occupations: screenwriter, activist
- Known for: Role in Chinese Me Too movement

Zhou Xiaoxuan (Chinese: 周晓璇; pinyin: Zhōu Xiǎoxuán; born c. 1993), better known by her pen name Xianzi (Chinese: 弦子; pinyin: Xiánzi), is a Chinese screenwriter and leading advocate in the Chinese Me Too movement.

== Biography ==
Zhou Xiaoxuan was born in Wuhan in circa 1993. She moved to Beijing when was 18 years old to study screenwriting. Zhou writes essays under the pen name Xianzi.

== Sexual assault allegations ==
In 2018, Zhou wrote an essay that was widely spread on social media. In it and a more detailed sequel, Zhou alleged that as an intern in 2014, she met with Zhu Jun, a Chinese television host, in the hope of getting an interview, but he forcibly kissed and groped her for about 50 minutes in his dressing room. She told the BBC that although they were interrupted several times by workers going in and out of the room, she was frozen with fear and shame and could not alert them. The day after, she reported the incident to the police. Zhou later joined the #MeToo movement and sued Zhu for a public apology and 50,000 yuan ($7,400) in damages. Zhu has denied all allegations and countersued Zhou for defamation. In September 2021, a Chinese court rejected her accusations against Zhu on the grounds of "insufficient evidence." Meanwhile, she has faced criticism from nationalist bloggers, and a commentary in the Global Times claimed that the MeToo movement was being used by "Western forces to tear Chinese society apart". On 10 August 2022, a court in Beijing rejected an appeal by Zhou after a closed-door hearing, citing as reason that the evidence submitted had been "insufficient". Afterwards, Zhou said that her legal team would focus on getting more evidence and footage that had not been included during the trial. A small group of her supporters showed up on the day of the ruling. Zhu Jun, however, has been absent from the proceedings, and Zhou has not heard of any further developments in his defamation suit against her. She told The Guardian that she was "very disappointed" but hoped that her loss "could provoke more reflection on the real difficulty of being a woman in today's China."

She was recognized as one of the BBC 100 Women in December 2022.
