= Yang Lan =

Chinese journalist, and talk show hostess (born 1968)

- 杨澜
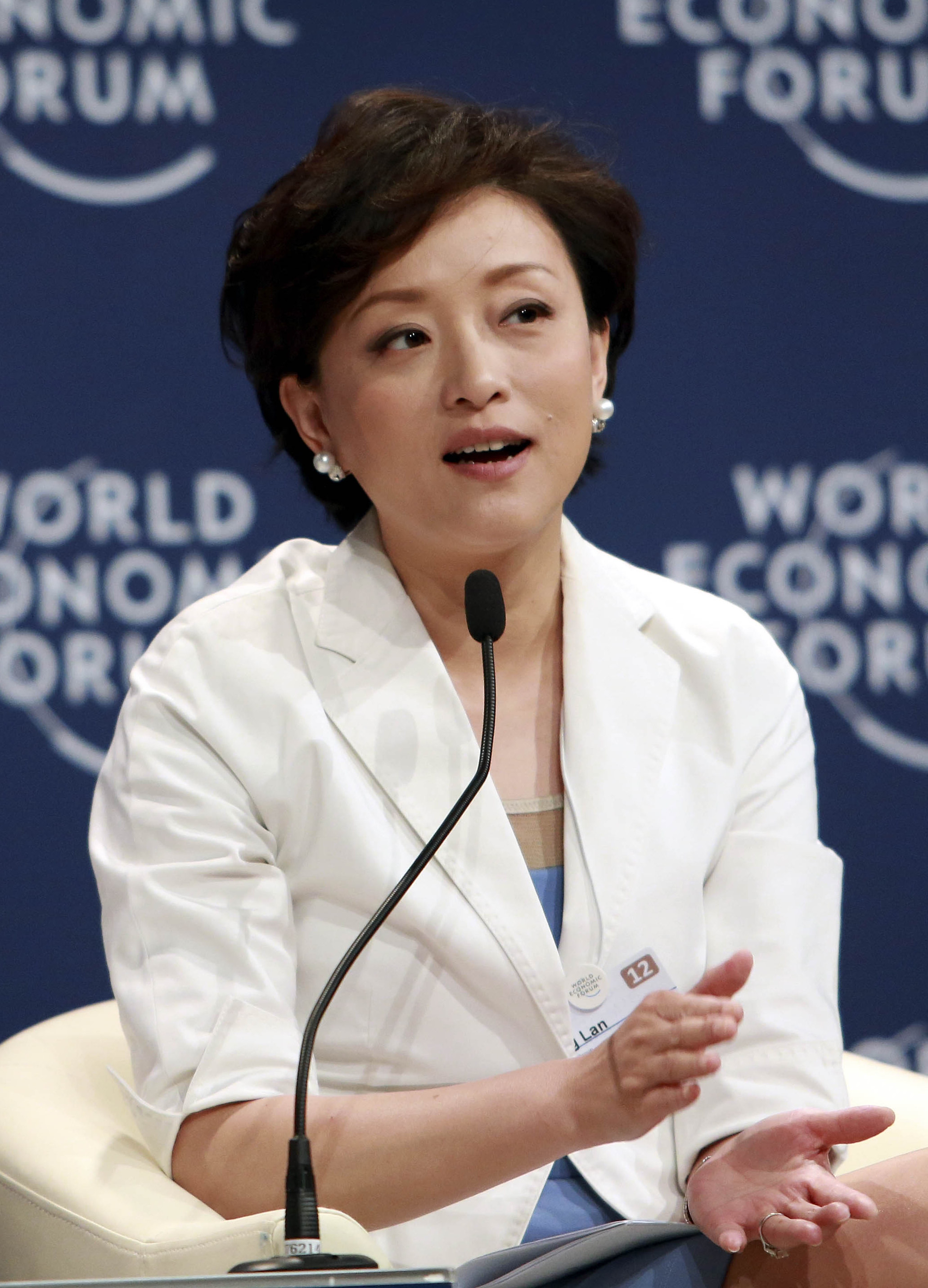
- Yang in 2012
- Born: March 31, 1968 (age 58); Beijing, China
- Education: Beijing Foreign Studies University; Columbia University
- Occupations: Co-founder and former chairperson of Sun Media Group; Philanthropist; Author
- Television: Yang Lan Studio
- Spouse(s): Zhang Yibin (divorced); Bruno Wu

Yang Lan (Chinese: 杨澜; pinyin: Yáng Lán; born March 31, 1968) is a Chinese media proprietor, journalist, and talk show host. She is the co-founder and chairperson of the Sun Media Group and the Sun Culture Foundation. In 2013, she was ranked number 100 in Forbes magazine's 100 World's Most Powerful Women.

== Early life ==
Yang Lan was born in 1968 in Beijing. Yang's mother was a civil engineer, and her father, Yan Mingfu, taught English literature at Beijing Foreign Studies University. Yan also served as the official translator for former Chinese Premier Zhou Enlai. From 1980 to 1986, she studied at the High School affiliated to Beijing Polytechnic University (now known as the Beijing Institute of Technology), which is the main high school in Haidian District. From 1986 to 1990, she studied at the Beijing Foreign Studies University and received her bachelor's degree in English Language and Literature.

== Career ==
=== 1990-1994: Zheng Da Variety Show ===
Yang started out with several local TV stations, but from 1990 joined China Central Television to produce a program called the Zheng Da Variety Show. Yang hosted the programme alongside Jiang Kun. Zheng Da Variety Show received positive reviews, but in 1991 Jiang Kun resigned as co-host citing his busy schedule.

The show continued with a group of hosts including Yang, however by August 1991 it had proven unsuccessful. The producers invited Zhao Zhongxiang to co-host with Yang and the two worked together for two and a half years.

In late 1993, Dhanin Chearavanont, the CEO of Charoen Pokphand, had dinner in Beijing with the Zheng Da Variety Show crew members, and encouraged Yang to study abroad having offered to pay her school fees.

=== 1994-1996: Study in Columbia University ===
After four years Yang left the Zheng Da Variety Show to go to New York. From January to May 1994 she studied film at New York University. Yang had decided she no longer wanted to host a variety show, instead taking interest in social or cultural programs. During her time in America she studied journalism, including TV news, TV documentaries, and other subjects, for two years. During her time there she also worked with Shanghai's Dragon Television to produce a program Yang Lan Sight (Chinese: 杨澜视线) where she discussed recent American art, films, and events in society. Each episode was twenty minutes in length.

Yang graduated with a master's degree (MIA) from Columbia University's School of International and Public Affairs (SIPA), where she is now a member of the Columbia University International Advisory Council (IAC).

In August 1995 during her summer break she returned to CCTV, and presided over the 95 International Collegiate Debate Competition.

Yang Lan returned to Beijing in January 1996 to attend a celebration for the three hundredth special episode Zheng Da Variety Show where re-joined by Jiang Kun, Dai Zongxian, Zhao Zhongxiang, Fang Shu, Fang Hui, Cheng Qian, Yuan Ming, Jiang Feng and Wang Xuechun. The group were also re-joined by their three Taiwan "tour guides" Li Xiuyuan, Xiejia Xun, and Qu Yanling.

=== 1997-1999: Joining Phoenix Television ===
In early 1997, Yang went to work as a public relations representative and spokesperson for Project Hope, China's main charity organisation. This took Yang from the pockets of growing wealth in the southern coastal provinces to the relentless poverty in the villages of Zhidan county, north of Xi'an. Yang cites this experience as inspiring her interest in providing cultural journalism for the Chinese people.

In July 1997 after her graduation, Yang went back to Hong Kong to join Phoenix Television. The station was at the time 45% owned by STAR-TV, a wholly owned subsidiary of Rupert Murdoch's News Corporation. The station broadcast general news and entertainment throughout China.

Yang launched her talk show Yang Lan studio (Chinese: 杨澜工作室) in January 1998, which emulated the type of in-depth interviews pioneered by Barbara Walters and David Frost in the United Kingdom and United States. Among her interviewees were hedge fund magnate George Soros (on his role in the Asian crisis); MIT Media Lab founder and angel investor Nicholas Negroponte (on media and telecom strategies); and Intel co-founder Andrew Grove (on his business' activities in China).

In April 1998, Yang launched These Hundred Years (Chinese: 百年叱咤风云录), based BBC and PBS television series joint production People's Century. The program showed the history of the century through documentary film clips interspersed with her commentary. In 1999, Yang Lan was named as one of the Asia 20 social and cultural leaders by Asiaweek. In October, she left the Phoenix Chinese Channel to raise her children.

Running weekly from the end of 1997 until the end of 1999, Yang's two shows consistently generated the largest advertising revenue for Phoenix Television.

=== 2000-present: Sun Media Investment Holdings Ltd ===
In 2000, Yang and her husband Dr. Bruno Wu launched Sun TV, the first Chinese historical and cultural channel in Greater China. Sun TV had an exclusive agreement with A+E Networks, one of the leading producers of history and biography programming in the world. Sun TV adapted A&E’s history and biography programs into a localized, Mandarin language format, as well as producing its own Chinese programs at its production centres in the People's Republic of China and Hong Kong.

On June 25, 2001, Yang Lan Studio changed its name to Yang Lan One On One (Chinese: 杨澜访谈录). Launched via Sun TV, it addressed the fast-changing environment in China, but also covered international concerns in politics, culture, and the economy. About the program, Yang Lan said:

As our mission is 'to educate through entertainment, and to illuminate through information’, the newly launched Yang Lan Studio is different from its former version and other talk show programs in several aspects. All the interviewees are people who create history or influence the world's development. Besides, we have developed our own unique features by no longer focusing on current issues or a profession, instead, using personal experiences, intuition and wisdom as the main theme, the program attempts to describe the individuals, their way of life and character through flesh and blood experiences which reveal the interviewees’ wisdom and philosophy.

In 2000 and 2001, Sun TV was twice selected by Forbes magazine as one of the world's best small businesses.

Over three years however Sun TV accumulated losses of more than HK$200 million ($25.64 million US dollars). In June 2003, Yang Lan announced she would be selling a 70% stake in Sun TV to a mainland Chinese media group, and that she would be leaving the business.

In July 2005, Yang Lan and her husband Bruno Wu donated Sun Media Group's 51% interest to non-profit organization Sun Culture Foundation in Hong Kong. Yang also resigned from all management positions, including her role as chairman of Sun Media Group.

In 2005 she created Her Village, a TV talk show geared toward a Chinese, urban, female audience, which was developed into a multimedia community to empower women. She has been firmly committed to promoting cross-cultural communications.

In 2007, she and Canadian singer Celine Dion announced in Beijing that they would collaborate on founding a jewellery accessories company in China. Yang Lan's initial idea of cooperating with Celine Dion was born right after she interviewed the superstar backstage at Dion's Las Vegas show at Caesars Palace hotel-casino in May, where both discovered they share the same birthday.

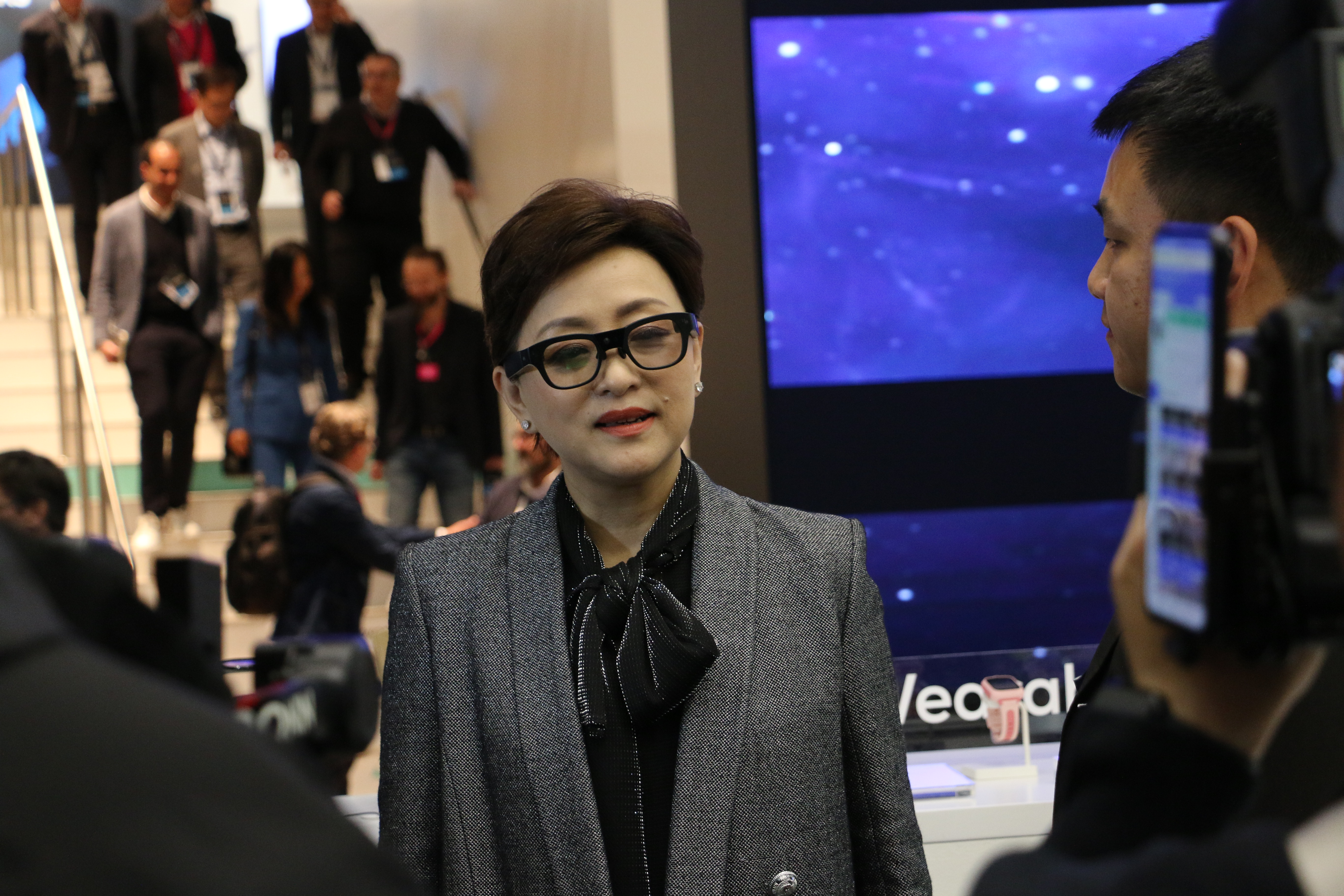
Yang trying TnCL glasses at MWC 2025 in Barcelona

In 2025, Yang Lan was reported to hold a controlling stake in DeepGreenX, a digital platform integrating sustainability data with blockchain technology. The company, headquartered in Canada, filed for a direct listing on the NYSE to commercialize its innovative approach to real-world asset tokenization and digital trading. In October 2025, the company submitted a formal request to withdraw its planned public offering. In early 2026, a Hong Kong weekly magazine published an investigative report alleging that some former investors of the Hong Kong–based iFree Group had been encouraged to transfer their shareholdings to DeepGreenX in connection with a proposed overseas listing, raising concerns about investor protections and regulatory status. DeepGreenX denied the allegations, stating that it had no direct investment relationship with iFree Group and that the magazine’s report contained factual inaccuracies, adding that it had not been contacted for verification prior to publication.

=== Endorsements ===
Yang was a spokesperson for Colgate toothpaste (2009), Nanshan Bywise milk powder (2010), Bluemoon hand sanitiser (2010), Masterkong mineralized Water (2013), and Deli stationery (2015).

== Yang Lan One-on-One ==
As a TV talk show, Yang Lan One-on-One focuses on getting to know leading figures from the fields of international politics, business, society and culture. On this program, Yang Lan profiles the guests' life stories, career experiences, and personal insights. Its sixteen-year history has made it one of the most regarded talk shows in China. Its host has conducted interviews with international figures and celebrities from around the world including Sophie Marceau, Bill Clinton, Elon Musk, Henry Kissinger, Lee Kuan Yew, Jack Welch, Andrew L. Webber, Tan Dun, Nicole Kidman, Jackie Chan, Kobe Bryant, Hugh Jackman, and Michael Phelps.

== Awards and recognitions ==
She was chosen to represent China as the ambassador for Beijing's bid for the 2008 Olympic Games, and was named as Goodwill Ambassador for the 2010 Shanghai Expo. Currently she is the Global Ambassador for the Special Olympics movement, the first UNICEF Ambassador in China, and the co-chair of the Lincoln Center China Advisory Council. Ms Yang was honored with many awards, including Chinese Women of the Year award by Women of China magazine, Top Ten Women Entrepreneurs award co-organized by China Women's Daily and Chinese socio-economic survey center, She Made It: Women Creating Television & Radio award by The Paley Center For Media, Global Leadership Award by SIPA of Columbia University, the National Philanthropy Award by the Ministry of Civil Affairs, and Women's Achievement Award in China.

== Personal life ==
Yang Lan was formerly married to Zhang Yibin, but the couple later divorced. During her stay in New York, she met Bruno Wu, whom she married at the Plaza Hotel in October 1995. Before marrying Yang, he operated a media consulting firm in New York.

Yang and Wu returned to China at the end of 1996. He soon set up in Hong Kong and in 1998 was named the chief operating officer of ATV, one of Hong Kong's two free TV stations. She commuted between Hong Kong and Shanghai and published Enjoy Wind by Seaside (Chinese: 凭海临风) a book of her essays, travel logs and historical sketches compiled during her time at Columbia, selling 600,000 copies.

== Filmography ==
Year	Title	Role	Notes
2010	Celine: Through the Eyes of the World	Herself	
2013	So Young	Herself	

== Bibliography ==
- Enjoy Wind by Seaside (Chinese: 凭海临风) ISBN 9787532115471
- One Question, One World (Chinese: 一问一世界)

== Olympics roles ==
Yang held a number of roles during China's bid for, and hosting of, the 2008 Olympics, including:

- September 1993 - Representative for the 2000 Olympics bid delegation team for China
- 13 July 2001 - Olympic Goodwill Ambassador & Presentation Speaker
- 9 June 2004 - Athens Olympic torchbearer
- January 2007 - Executive producer and host of Olympic Songfest, a TV program to select the Olympic songs and music
- 8 August 2007 - Host of the Beijing 2008 One-year Countdown programme
- 4 May 2008 - Beijing Olympic torchbearer
- 24 August 2008 - Host at the closing ceremonies of the 2008 Beijing Olympics
