= Bruno Wu =

Chinese entrepreneur and media executive

- 吴征
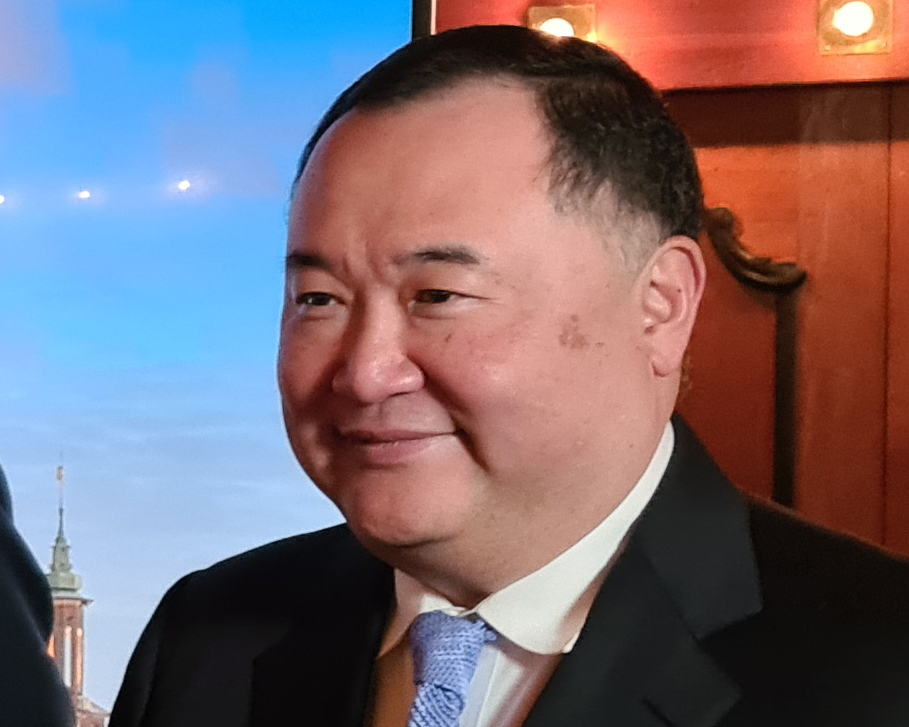
- Wu in 2023
- Born: Wu Zheng; 1966 (age 59–60)
- Education: Culver–Stockton College (BA); Fudan University (PhD)
- Occupations: Entrepreneur, media executive
- Known for: Co-founding Sun Media Group; former chair of Wecast/Seven Stars Cloud (later Ideanomics)
- Spouse: Yang Lan

Bruno Wu Zheng (Chinese: 吴征; born 1966) is a Chinese entrepreneur and media executive. He co-founded the media company Sun Media Group together with television host Yang Lan in the late 1990s, and later chaired Wecast Network/Seven Stars Cloud Group, which was renamed Ideanomics. In August 2024, the U.S. Securities and Exchange Commission (SEC) announced a settled enforcement action involving Ideanomics, Wu and others. In 2016, Forbes estimated the family’s net worth at around US$1 billion.

== Education ==
Wu earned a B.A. from Culver–Stockton College in 1990. He later completed a Ph.D. at the School of International Relations and Public Affairs, Fudan University.

== Career ==
With Yang Lan, Wu co-founded Sun Media Group around 1999, operating television and print ventures focused on the Chinese-language market. He subsequently led and invested in media and technology companies. In the mid-2010s, he chaired Wecast Network (later Seven Stars Cloud Group and then Ideanomics), pursuing digital media and, later, clean-mobility investments. Separately, Wu has been linked to roles at internet and media companies in China during the 2000s and 2010s; public company disclosures list him as a past director or chair in those contexts.

== SEC enforcement action ==
On 20 August 2024, Reuters reported that Ideanomics had settled SEC fraud charges tied to statements it made to investors; the report identified Wu among the respondents. On 18 October 2024, the SEC published its order, which Wu consented to without admitting or denying the findings. The order imposed: (i) a cease-and-desist from violations of Section 17(a) of the Securities Act and Section 10(b) of the Exchange Act and Rule 10b-5; (ii) a ten-year officer-and-director bar from serving at public companies; (iii) a ten-year penny-stock bar; and (iv) disgorgement, prejudgment interest and a civil money penalty.

== Personal life ==
Wu is married to Yang Lan; both have been publicly associated with Sun Media since its launch.
