= Zhao An =

Chinese television producer and director (born c. 1959)

Zhao An (Chinese: 赵安; born c. 1959) is a Chinese television producer and director. He directed four editions of the CCTV New Year's Gala, the most watched annual television event in China.

== Biography ==
He is best known for going to jail on charges of bribery. It was said that he took some 110,000 yuan in cash bribes and a home entertainment system worth over 500,000 yuan from producer Zhang Junyi, in return for featuring Zhang's programs on the gala. Zhao was expelled from the Chinese Communist Party and also dismissed from all his positions at CCTV. In 2003, he was sentenced to 10 years in prison by the Intermediate People's Court of Beijing. After his release, he returned to directing large arts and entertainment events, including a Chinese New Year gala event at the United Nations in New York, in 2015.
