= Danger Has Two Faces =

1985 Hong Kong film by Alex Cheung

- Film poster
- Traditional Chinese: 皇家大賊
- Simplified Chinese: 皇家大贼
- Hanyu Pinyin: Huáng Jiā Dà Zéi
- Jyutping: Wong4 Gaa1 Daai6 Caak2
- Directed by: Alex Cheung
- Written by: Alex Cheung; Yuen Ka-chi
- Produced by: Mona Fong
- Starring: Bryan Leung; Paul Chu; Carroll Gordon; Liu Lai-ling; Fei Xiang
- Cinematography: Lee San-yip
- Edited by: Siu Fung; Ma Chung-yiu; Chiu Cheuk-man
- Music by: Stephen Sing; So Chan-hau
- Production company: Shaw Brothers Studio
- Distributed by: Shaw Brothers Studio
- Release date: 31 May 1985
- Running time: 90 minutes
- Country: Hong Kong
- Language: Cantonese
- Budget: HK$4,128,000

Danger Has Two Faces is a 1985 Hong Kong action film directed by Alex Cheung and starring Bryan Leung, Paul Chu and Fei Xiang. The film is produced and distributed by Shaw Brothers Studio.

== Plot ==
Many years ago, Inspector Kam Chi-kin or Ah-kam (Bryan Leung) killed an innocent man and decided to resign from the police force. He then became a professional killer, paid by Uncle Hung (Che Hung), and disguises as a pet store owner in order to earn money to raise his son. His best friend, Bobby Chow Fuk-cheung (Fei Xiang) recently returned from UK and works under Superintendent Lau Cheuk-aang (Paul Chu). Chow has been investigating recent murder cases that were done by Ah Kam. Later, as one of his colleague Sam (Kirk Wong) is murdered, Chow discovered the mastermind behind these cases were actually Superintendent Lau. Lau then murders one of his subordinate Man (Cheung Ming-man), mistaken him to have discovered his identity. Later, Uncle Hung takes Kam's son hostage and orders him to kill Chow. Kam later disguises Chow's murder and they both confront Lau, Hung, the gang and two police officers Wai (Chan Chik-wai) and Chicken Blood.

== Cast ==
- Bryan Leung as Kam Chi-kin
- Paul Chu as Superintendent Lau Cheuk-sang
- Carroll Gordon as Jenny
- Liu Lai-ling as Ling
- Fei Xiang as Inspector Bobby Chow Fuk-cheung
- Cheung Ming-man as Man
- Kirk Wong as Sergeant Sam Leung
- Pamela Peck as pet store customer
- Lam Fai-wong as robber
- Cheng Kei-ying as robber
- Charlie Cho as man impersonating cop
- Paul Che as armoured car driver
- Pak Sha-lik as man shot by Kam (flashback)
- Chan Chik-wai as Wai
- Leung Siu-wah as robber
- Wong Kim-fung as robber who fights with Bobby
- Kam Piu as man outside hotel
- Fung Ging Man as man meeting Sergeant Sam
- Kei Ho-chiu as robber
- Tam Tin-nam as tall man at bus stop
- Yuen Ling-to as armoured car guard
- Hon Kong as man at police station
- Ko Hung as bodyguard
- Amy Au as wife of man shot by Kam
- Che Hung as Uncle Hung
- Fung Ming as man meeting Sergeant Sam
- Cheung Kwok-wah as truck driver

== Box office ==
This film grossed HK$4,128,000 during its theatrical run from 31 May to 13 June 1985 in Hong Kong.
