= I Can I BB =

Chinese television series

I Can I BB (formerly known as You Can You BB from the first to the fourth season; Qipashuo 奇葩说) was a Chinese online debate variety show, produced by IQIYI and MEWE. It aired from 2014 to 2021, spanning seven seasons, and was hosted by Ma Dong. I Can I BB was one of the most popular online shows in China, with its fourth season reached 780 million viewers.

== Meaning of “BB” ==
“BB” is in Beijing and Northeastern dialect, originally coming with the Internet slang “You can you up, No can no BB” (“你行你上，不行就别BB"), meaning that “if you are better than who you criticize, you go and do it; if not, then shut up”. “BB” means “to talk nonsense”.

== Topics and contestants ==
The show became culturally significant in China, where it produced 1,179 trending phrases on the internet in China and developed a large viewership.

=== Topics ===
Topics and resolutions are collected from online platforms such as Weibo and in IQIYI PaoPao. The resolutions in the show are from day to day topics, including relationships, family, ideology, trends, careers, friendship, etc. Everyone can come up resolutions and hashtag a specific hashtag requested by IQIYI. Then IQIYI and MEWE sort the suggestions and open public poll to finalize the resolution list.

=== Contestants ===
Contestants' background are diverse. Candidates are selected from the people who are fluent in Chinese all over world. Many of them are not even Chinese. Some of them are from Singapore and United States. In the early seasons, many candidates are professional debaters from top universities such as Yale University, Peking University, but most of the contestants originally major in non-debate areas. There are fashion hosts, actors, college professors, politicians, students, writers, etc.

== Seasons and episodes ==
=== The first season ===
In this season, Ma Dong is the program host. Kevin Tsai, Xiaosong Gao are the instructors. In each episode, one famous female is invited to the show. They joke around and decide which debater is kept and which is knocked out at the end of the episode.

==== Results ====
- 1st place: Weiwei Ma
- 2nd place: Rujing Yan
- 3rd place: Xiao Xiao

==== Episodes and resolutions ====
The following table is a summary of the resolutions discussed and their corresponding show date of Season 1.

Episodes and Resolutions in Season 1
Release Date	Resolutions
11/29/2014	Should a beautiful woman work hard or look for a good partner?
11/30/2014	Should we check our partner's phone?
12/04/2014	Is appearance more important?
12/05/2014	Should we divorce if there is no love in our marriage anymore?
12/06/2014	Am I wrong to report dishonesty in projects?
12/07/2014	Should we get rid of the money as a wedding gift?
12/13/2014	If I fall in love with one of my friend's partner, should I pursue her?
12/14/2014	Do matching family background matter for marriage?
12/20/2014	Is urging one to get married love or craziness?
12/21/2014	Is “he/she is my best guy/girl friend” a lie?
12/27/2014	Should we split the bill on the first date.
12/28/2014	Is it reasonable to sacrifice Jia Ling to save everyone else?
01/02/2015	If the leader is wrong, should we tell him?
01/03/2015	Which one do you think is more disgusting? Having an emotional affair or a physical affair?
01/10/2015	Should we marry someone you love or someone loves you?
01/11/2015	Which do you prefer? A big city with high living cost or a small city with low living cost ?
01/17/2015	Can we maintain the friendship with our ex(es)?
01/18/2015	Should we pursue a stable job or pursue our dream(s) in/after our thirtieth?
01/24/2015	Encountering a b*tch at the workplace, should you fight back or ignore him?
01/25/2015	Should underaged dates be supported?
01/31/2015	To succeed, should we accept the hidden rules in the industries?
02/01/2015	Am I wrong if I don't want a kid in my marriage?
02/07/2015	Is being hypercritical a good thing?
02/15/2015	N/A
02/28/2015	N/A

=== The second season ===
Instructors: Kevin Tsai and Jin Xing

==== Results ====
- 1st place: Chen Qiu
- 2nd place: Xiao Xiao
- 3rd place: Ming Chen and Rujing Yan

==== Episodes and resolutions ====
The following table is a summary of the resolutions discussed and their corresponding show date of Season 2.

Episodes and Resolutions in Season 2
Release date	Resolutions
06/26/2015	If your good friend's partner cheats on him, should you tell him?
06/27/2015	If we encounter our true love outside our marriage, should we divorce our partner?
07/03/2015	Which type of dating partner should we look for? The one with more experience or the one with little experience?
07/04/2015	Is open marriage acceptable?
07/10/2015	If the end of the world was in one month, should the government announce it?
07/11/2015	Should we tell our parents if we are homosexual?
07/17/2015	If you are in bad economic circumstances, is having a baby a good idea?
07/18/2015	Should you have a “Plan B” when in a long-term dating?
07/24/2015	If kids were bullied, should they fight back or report it to the teacher?
07/25/2015	Is it okay to have sex with our good friends?
07/31/2015	Is my partner's money also mine?
08/01/2015	Should we tell our partner about our love history?
08/07/2015	Should we press our friends for the payment of a debt?
08/08/2015	Is immortality a good thing?
08/21/2015	Can plastic surgery help you be successful?
08/22/2015	Should we block our parents on WeChat Moments?
08/28/2015	If colleagues are not responsible, should I mind the business for them?
08/29/2015	Should we change to what our partner wants us to be like?
09/04/2015	Can girls pursue the boys?
09/05/2015	Does the main person of a scandal deserve to be scolded by the population for a long time?
09/11/2015	Should we be thrifty and save money?
09/12/2015	Is it a waste to be a housewife with a high education level?
09/18/2015	Is traveling on a budget worth being proud of?
09/19/2015	Which is better? Buy or not buy a house?

The Seventh Season

In the seventh season of I Can I BB, the show heritage the rules from previous season. The hoster Dong Ma invited four famous instructors who are expert from their area:

Kevin Tsai, a Taiwanese writer, television host. film director and screenwriter.

Dan Li, a Chinese stand-up comedian, scriptwriter, planner, and writer.

Zhaofeng Xue, an internet economics scholar and former co-director of Peking University's Law and Economics Research Center.

Qing Liu, professor of East China Normal University, director of the Center for World Politics at East China Normal University.

In this season, the show's criteria for selecting debate topics are more relevant to the present, with priority given to topics that "can only be discussed in 2020".

The final BBKing（Champion）: ShouEr Fu.

What's new?

There is a new competition for the comeback spots called “That's Nonsense” in which debaters have been asked some random nonsense sentences from online. Then debater needs to react quickly and argue back.

==== Episodes and resolutions ====
The following table is a summary of the resolutions discussed and their corresponding show date of Season 7.

Release date	Episode	Resolution
12/17/2020	EP00 Part 1	N/A(A Thousand people audition)
12/19/2020	EP00 Part 2	N/A(A Thousand people audition)
12/24/2000	EP01	N/A(second round audition)
12/26/2020	EP02	N/A(second round audition)
12/31/2020	EP03	N/A(second round audition)
01/02/2021	EP04	N/A(second round audition)
01/07/2021	EP05	"Mom is crazy to support male celebrities, completely absent from home, should I stop her?"
01/09/2021	EP06	"Qipa planet is going to launch 'Ex Review App', do you support it?"
01/14/2021	EP07	"Adult meltdowns, to hide or not to hide？"
01/16/2021	EP08	"Should I return a work message after work?"
01/21/2021	EP09	"Parents are touting teachers in the group chat, should I follow them?"
01/23/2021	EP10	"Should I receive a bride price if I am an independent woman?"
01/28/2021	EP11	"My wife earns a million dollars a year, should I quit my job and become a full-time father?"
01/30/2021	EP12	"The true love is very afraid of dogs, should I send my dog away?"
02/04/2021	EP13	"Should parents tell their children that the family is not rich?"
02/06/2021	EP14	"Qipa planet new technology, people can freely buy and sell life time, do you support it?"
02/11/2021	EP15	"People around my age are better off than me, should I work hard to catch up?"
02/13/2021	EP16	"Is it my problem to be cheated frequently?"
02/18/2021	EP17	"My best friend lost love to find me crying everyday, I'm tired of listening. Should I palter him/her?"
02/20/2021	EP18	"There is an overnight success opportunity, should I take it at age 20?"
02/25/2021	EP19	"As a newcomer in the workplace, my boss obviously doesn't like me, should I quit my job?"
02/27/2021	EP20	"Should parents teach older siblings to yield to younger siblings?"
03/04/2021	EP21	"Receiving the life advice from yourself in 30 years. Should I read it?"
03/06/2021	EP22	"In order to improve efficiency, Qipa planet invented the "no sleep drug", do you support it?"

== Platforms that I Can I BB is on shown ==
Type “奇葩说” into the search bar.

Platforms	Links
IQIYI	https://www.iqiyi.com/
TENCENT TV	https://v.qq.com/
