= Alilang Group =

Chinese pop group

Alilang Group (Chinese: 阿里郎组合) is a Chinese pop music group, made up of four Korean Chinese members: Jin Zenan (金泽男, Kim Taek-nam, leader, born 10 October 1979), Jin Runji (金润吉, Kim Yun-gil), Zhang Jinyou (张晋佑, Chang Jin-u) and Quan He (权赫, Kwon Hyok), all of Jilin Province, China. The group's name comes from "Arirang" (spelled "Alilang" in Chinese Pinyin), a Korean folk song, popular not only in Korea, but also in China and Japan.

Alilang Group started in 2002, and published their first CD, entitled "Alilang", in 2003. They are popular as a C-pop group among the Chinese young as well as among the Korean Chinese.

The group has appeared in "CCTV New Year's Gala" several times, a great honor to any Chinese musicians. They have toured in both South and North Korea. In 2003, they toured in South Korea and published their CD there. In 2009, when they appeared in North Korea, 100,000 people came to the Pyongyang arena.

== Discography ==
The following CDs have been published:

- Alilang Group: "Arirang" CD (2003)
- Alilang Group: "I'm Sorry! Coming of age" CD (2006)
- Alilang Group: "Four People in Different Moods (四人五色) CD (2008)

The songs that they sang and which became popular are:

- "Arirang" (阿里郎)
- "Doraji" (桔梗谣)
- "The Lovers' Bar" (情侶酒吧)
- "My Dearest" (最愛)

== See also ==
- C-pop
- Korean Chinese
- Arirang
