= Benny Sa =

Chinese journalist (born 23 March 1976)

Sǎ Bèiníng
- 撒贝宁
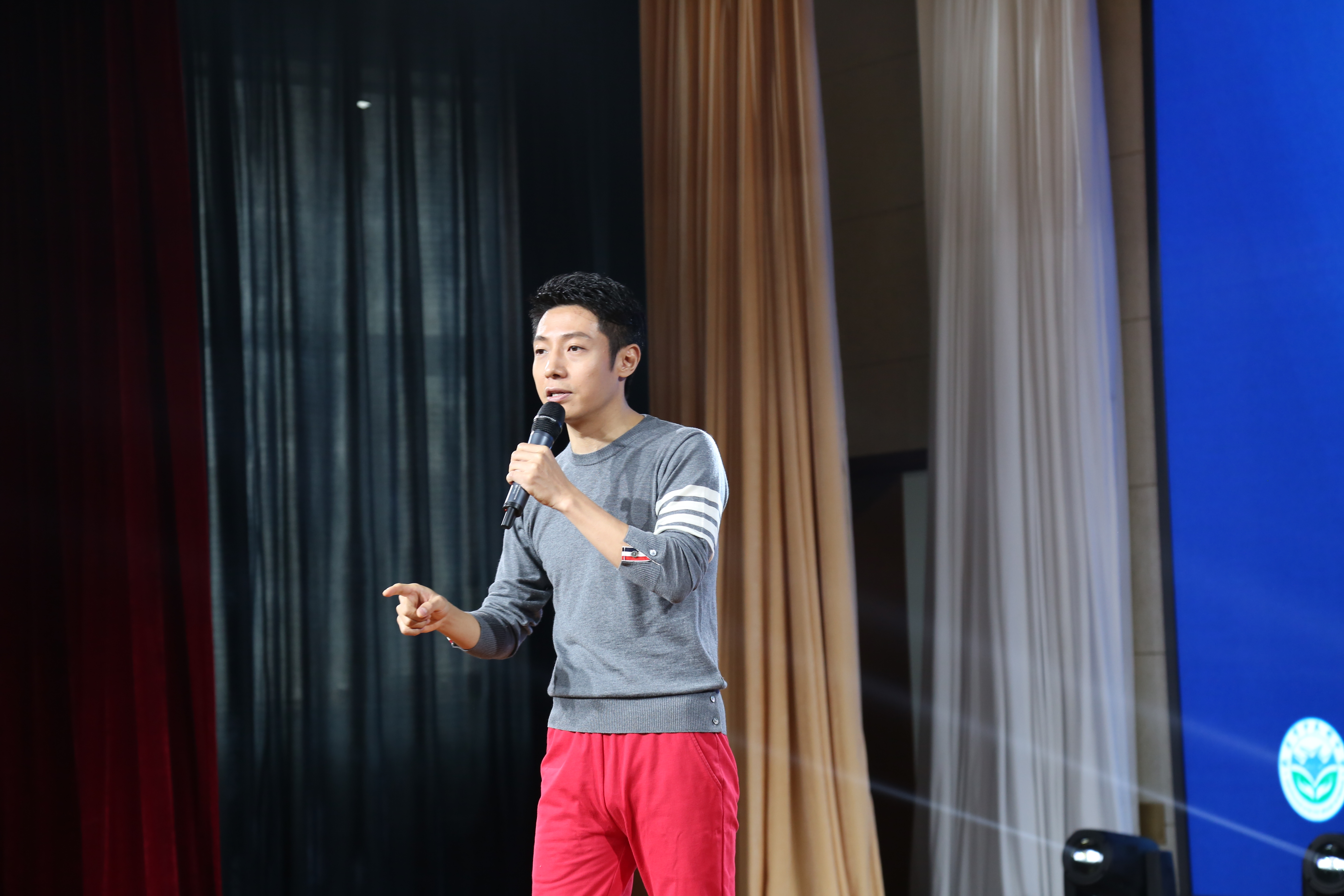
- Sa in 2017
- Born: March 23, 1976 (age 50); Zhanjiang, Guangdong, China
- Education: Peking University
- Occupations: Host, Journalist
- Years active: 1999-present
- Known for: Legal Report
- Television: China Central Television (CCTV)
- Spouse: Lisa Hoffman (李白) (m. 2016)
- Children: 2
- Parent(s): Father: Sǎ Shìguì; Mother: Dèng Yǎjuān
- Awards: Golden Mike Award; 2006; Golden Eagle Award for Best Programme Host; 2004

Benny Sa, also known as Sa Beining (simplified Chinese: 撒贝宁; traditional Chinese: 撒貝寧; pinyin: Sǎ Bèiníng; born 23 March 1976) is a Chinese television host known for his work for China Central Television (CCTV). He served as the one-time anchor of the documentary program Legal Report (今日说法).

== Biography ==
=== Early experience ===
Sa Beining was born into a military family in Zhanjiang, Guangdong in March 1976, the son of Dèng Yǎjuān (邓雅娟), a graduate of Shenyang Conservatory of Music, and Sǎ Shìguì (撒世贵), a Chinese actor in Wuhan Drama Theatre. He has a younger sister: Sǎ Bèinà (撒贝娜).

He started to perform on stage at the age of four, and by age eleven, he hosted a house-party with his sister at home.

=== Education experience ===
During high school, Sa expressed his desire to attend the Beijing Film Academy or Central Academy of Drama. In the winter holiday before the National College Entrance Examination, he was allowed to join in the winter camp held by Peking University for his abilities in literature and art. Shortly after that, he participated in the centralized exam held by Peking University for students who showed an exceptional performance in the exam, resulting in him gaining his letter of admission from Peking University. Because of this, Sa served as a teaching assistant to share his experiences with other students before graduation.

=== Professional experience ===
Sa was selected to host the TV program Legal Report due to the recommendations of his instructors at the Peking University Law School, as a result of his many extra-curriculum experiences and high score. The producers initially wanted a lawyer to host the show but chose to go in a different direction as a lawyer might be too busy to host the program and could lack the qualifications necessary for a host. Sa was aware that his hosting skills were weak, particularly during the early recording stage. He was worried that he would be eliminated due to poor performance and kept trying to determine how others viewed him. Sa practiced his hosting skills every day and was eventually selected as the official host of the program. In the second year after entering the China Central Television, he won the championship in the National TV Host Contest.

== Personal life ==
Sa was in a relationship with Tú Jīngwěi (涂经纬) in 2006. They split in 2009. Then Sa reportedly had a whirlwind romance with Cén Lílán (岑黎阑). Sa was involved in a relationship with actress Zhang Ziyi beginning in September 2011; they split in 2013. In 2015, Sa was seen dating Canadian singer Lisa Marie Hoffman (known by her Chinese name 李白, Lǐ Bái). They married on 28 March 2016.

== Hosting experience ==
Hosting Programme
Time of First Broadcast	English title	Chinese title	Notes
2021.02.12	China in Classics	典籍里的中国	Programs about traditional cultural works
2019.10.26 - 2020.02.02	China Central Radio and Television Station 2019 Host Competition	中央广播电视总台2019主持人大赛	A national presenter competition
2018-12-16	Everlasting Classics	经典咏流传	Poetry culture music program
2017-12-31	We Are Teenagers	放学别走	Adolescent's talk show
2017-11-19	Beyond The Edge Season 3	挑战不可能第三季	CCTV inspirational challenge program
2017-10-05	See China	绿水青山看中国	Ecological civilization theme program
2017-09-01	The First Lesson 2017	开学第一课2017	Theme: My Chinese pride
2017-07-16	Forward To The Future Season 2	加油！向未来第二季	CCTV's first scientific experiment program
2017-01-20	2017 Network Spring Festival Gala	2017网络春晚	Theme: Filial Piety
2016-10-30	Beyond The Edge Season 2	挑战不可能第二季	CCTV inspirational challenge program
2016-09-01	The First Lesson 2016	开学第一课2016	Theme: Pass the Long March Spirit
2016-07-03	Forward To The Future Season 1	加油！向未来	CCTV's first scientific experiment program
2016-02-07	2016 CCTV Spring Festival Gala	2016中央电视台春晚	Theme: Chinese Dream, Building a Well-off Society
2015-09-04	The First Lesson 2015	开学第一课2015	Theme: Heroic Immortal
2015-08-02	Beyond The Edge Season 1	挑战不可能	CCTV Inspirational Challenge Program
2015-07-02	Perhaps Love Season 2	如果爱第二季	Star love reality show
2015-03-01	Brilliant Chinese Season 2	出彩中国人第二季	CCTV large inspirational reality show
2015-02-18	2015 CCTV Spring Festival Gala	2015中央电视台春晚	Theme: Home Is Everything
2014-12-21	Dream Star Partner Season 2	梦想星搭档第二季	CCTV large TV public music program
2014-09-01	The First Lesson 2014	开学第一课2014	Theme: Parents Teach Me
2014-02-09	Brilliant Chinese Season 1	出彩中国人	CCTV large inspirational reality show
2013-10-25	Dream Star Partner Season 1	梦想星搭档	CCTV large TV public music program
2013-09-01	The First Lesson 2013	开学第一课2013	Theme: Take the Wings of Dreams
2013-03-31	Sa's Time	撒贝宁时间	Detective reasoning program
2013-02-24	Fight For You	为你而战	CCTV Public Welfare Program
2013-02-09	2013 CCTV Spring Festival Gala	2013中央电视台春晚	Theme: New Year of China
2012-11-30	Dream Choir Season 2	梦想合唱团第二季	CCTV large-scale social welfare TV activities
2012-09-02	The First Lesson 2012	开学第一课2012	Theme: Beauty Is By Your Side
2012-08-27	Voice	开讲啦	China's first youth TV open class
2012-01-22	2012 CCTV Spring Festival Gala	2012中央电视台春晚	Theme: Going Home for the New Year
2011-11-12	Dream Choir Season 1	梦想合唱团	CCTV large-scale social welfare TV activities
2011-09-01	The First Lesson 2011	开学第一课2011	Theme: Where Is the Happiness
2011-08-07	Shouxi Yehua	首席夜话	CCTV studio talk show
2010-09-01	Show Me First	我们有一套	CCTV variety emotional program
1999-01-02	Legal Report	今日说法	CCTV daily legal system program

== Awards ==
- 2000 The first prize of the China TV Legal System Host Competition
- 2000 China TV List Newcomer of the Year Award
- 2001 The Most Promising Host Award of the First National College Student TV Festival
- 2001 CCTV Top Ten Hosts Online Awards
- 2001 "Rongshida" TV host contest gold medal
- 2004 CCTV Annual Grade B Moderator
- 2005 The 5th Golden Eagle Festival Best National Host
- 2005 CCTV Annual Grade B Moderator
- 2006 The "Golden Microphone Award" TV broadcast host program award
- 2006 CCTV Annual Grade A Moderator
- 2007 CCTV Annual Grade A Moderator
- 2008 CCTV Annual Grade B Moderator
- 2009 CCTV Annual Grade A Moderator
- 2010 China University Students TV Festival's most popular male host
- 2011 Shanghai TV Festival "Top Ten New Chinese Language Style Hosting"
- 2012 CCTV Annual Grade A Moderator
- 2013 The "Golden Microphone Award" from the 2012 China Broadcasting Host
- 2016 Top Ten Excellent Announcer and Host Award of CCTV
