= Ren Luyu =

Chinese television host

Ren Luyu (Chinese: 任鲁豫, born 9 May 1978) is a Chinese television host.

== Early life ==
Ren was born in Xinxiang, Henan, China. Ren's first name, "Luyu" is a portmanteau of the abbreviations for Shandong and Henan provinces, the origin of his parents. Ren graduated from Henan University.

== Career ==
Ren worked for Henan Television. In 2002, he was hired into the Western department of China Central Television (CCTV). He hosted the show Want a Challenge?, then took on a series of roles in the music channel of CCTV.

Ren was a host on the CCTV New Year's Gala on two occasions, in 2010 and 2016.
