= The Galaxy on Earth =

- Directed by: Ning Haiqiang; Shen Dong
- Production companies: Zhong Gong Bei Jing Municipal Publicity Department; Beijing press and Publication Bureau; Bayi Film Studio; Beijing South-to-North Water Diversion Office
- Release date: November 15, 2014
- Running time: 98 minutes
- Country: China
- Language: Mandarin
- Box office: ¥5.40 million (China)

The Galaxy on Earth (Chinese: 天河) is a 2014 Chinese drama film directed by Ning Haiqiang and Shen Dong. It was released on November 15, 2014.

== Cast ==
- Li Youbin
- Faye Yu
- Duan Yihong
- Wang Ruoxin
- Zhao Youliang
- Huang Meiying
- Gao Ming
- Song Chunli
- Lin Miaoke
- Wu Jun
- Lin Yongjian
- Pu Cunxin
- Jiang Kun
- Xiao Xiangyu
- Chen Baoguo
- Hou Shijia
- Jiang Ping

== Reception ==
=== Box office ===
By November 21, 2014, the film had earned ¥5.40 million at the Chinese box office.
