= Ma Fanshu =

Chinese television host

- 马凡舒
- Born: 6 November 1993 (age 32); Harbin, Heilongjiang, China
- Education: Communication University of China
- Occupation: Television host
- Years active: 2014–present
- Agent: China Central Television

Chinese name
- Simplified Chinese: 马凡舒
- Traditional Chinese: 馬凡舒
Transcriptions
Standard Mandarin
- Hanyu Pinyin: Mǎ Fánshū

Ma Fanshu (Chinese: 马凡舒; born 6 November 1993) is a Chinese television host who shot to fame for hosting the CMG New Year's Gala.

== Biography ==
Ma was born in Harbin, Heilongjiang, on 6 November 1993. In 2012, she was accepted to the Communication University of China.

On 24 November 2014, she hosted World Football with Duan Xuan. On 16 July 2021, she was selected as a host for the China Central Television. She hosted the CMG New Year's Gala since 2022.

== Television ==
- World Football (since 2014)
- CMG New Year's Gala (since 2022)
- Yangshipin Young Summer (2024)
