= Xidan Girl =

Ren Yueli
- Born: April 13, 1988 (age 37); Zhuozhou, Hebei, China

Chinese name
- Traditional Chinese: 任月麗
- Simplified Chinese: 任月丽
Transcriptions
Standard Mandarin
- Hanyu Pinyin: Rén Yuèlì
- Musical career
- Also known as: "Xidan Girl" (西单女孩) "Xidan Angel" (西单天使)

Ren Yueli (born April 13, 1988), better known by her nickname Xidan Girl (西单女孩), is a Chinese Mandopop recording artist and a previous street musician-turned Internet celebrity.

== Biography ==
From a poor village in Zhuozhou, Hebei, she migrated to Beijing at the age of 16 looking for work. Struggling to get by, she was eventually forced to perform songs on a street. In December 2008, a video of her performing the song "Tianshi de Chibang" (天使的翅膀; "Angel's Wings") with a guitar in Xidan subway station, Beijing, recorded by a bystander, went viral online. As her name was unknown then, she was simply called "Xidan Girl" by Chinese netizens, many claiming to have been reduced to tears by her heartfelt performance.

TV stations and journalists soon located her and she began performing on TV. In April 2010, Ren Yueli signed with Beijing New Run Entertainment Co., Ltd. In 2011, she performed in CCTV New Year's Gala, China's top-watched annual television event.

Her life experiences were dramatized in a 2011 Chinese film Xidan Girl.

== Discography ==
- 2012 album: Xidan Girl (西单女孩)

== Publications ==
- Wo Shi Xidan Nühai 我是西单女孩 [I Am the Xidan Girl] (in Chinese). Modern Education Press. 2011. ISBN 978-7510604928.

== Filmography ==
- 2013 — Yang Guang Liu Shou (阳光留守)
