= Dong Qing =

Chinese television host

- 董卿
- Born: November 17, 1973 (age 52); Shanghai, China
- Education: Shanghai Theatre Academy; East China Normal University
- Occupation: Host
- Years active: 1993 - present
- Television: China Central Television (CCTV)
- Awards: Golden Mike Award; 2001; Golden Mike Award; 2006; Golden Eagle Award for Best Programme Host; 2006

Dong Qing (Chinese: 董卿; pinyin: Dǒng Qīng; born 17 November 1973) is a Chinese television host. From 2005 to 2017, she hosted the annual CCTV New Year's Gala.

She won the Golden Mike Award's for Television in 2001 and 2006, and received Golden Eagle Award for Best Programme Host in 2006.

== Biography ==
Dong was born in a highly educated family in Shanghai in 1973, both her father and mother were graduates of Fudan University.

Dong secondary studied at Jiaxing No.1 High School, she graduated from Shanghai Theatre Academy in 1993, where she majored in broadcast, then she studied at East China Normal University.

Dong worked in Zhejiang Television from 1993 to 1995 and OTV from 1995 to 2002.

From May 2002 to present, Dong worked in China Central Television.

Dong hosted the CCTV New Year's Gala from 2005 to 2017.

In 2016, she began her plan to produce a show about reading. The first episode of her show Readers went on air in February 2017 and became an instant hit.

== Awards ==
- 2001 Golden Mic Award's for Television
- 2006 Golden Mic Award's for Television
- 2006 Golden Eagle Award for Best Programme Host

== Personal life ==
Her first love was a Zhejiang University graduate student. She next had a relationship with a civil servant in Shanghai. She later married Chinese businessman Chunlei Mi.
