= Zhao Zhongxiang =

Chinese television presenter (1942–2020)

- 赵忠祥
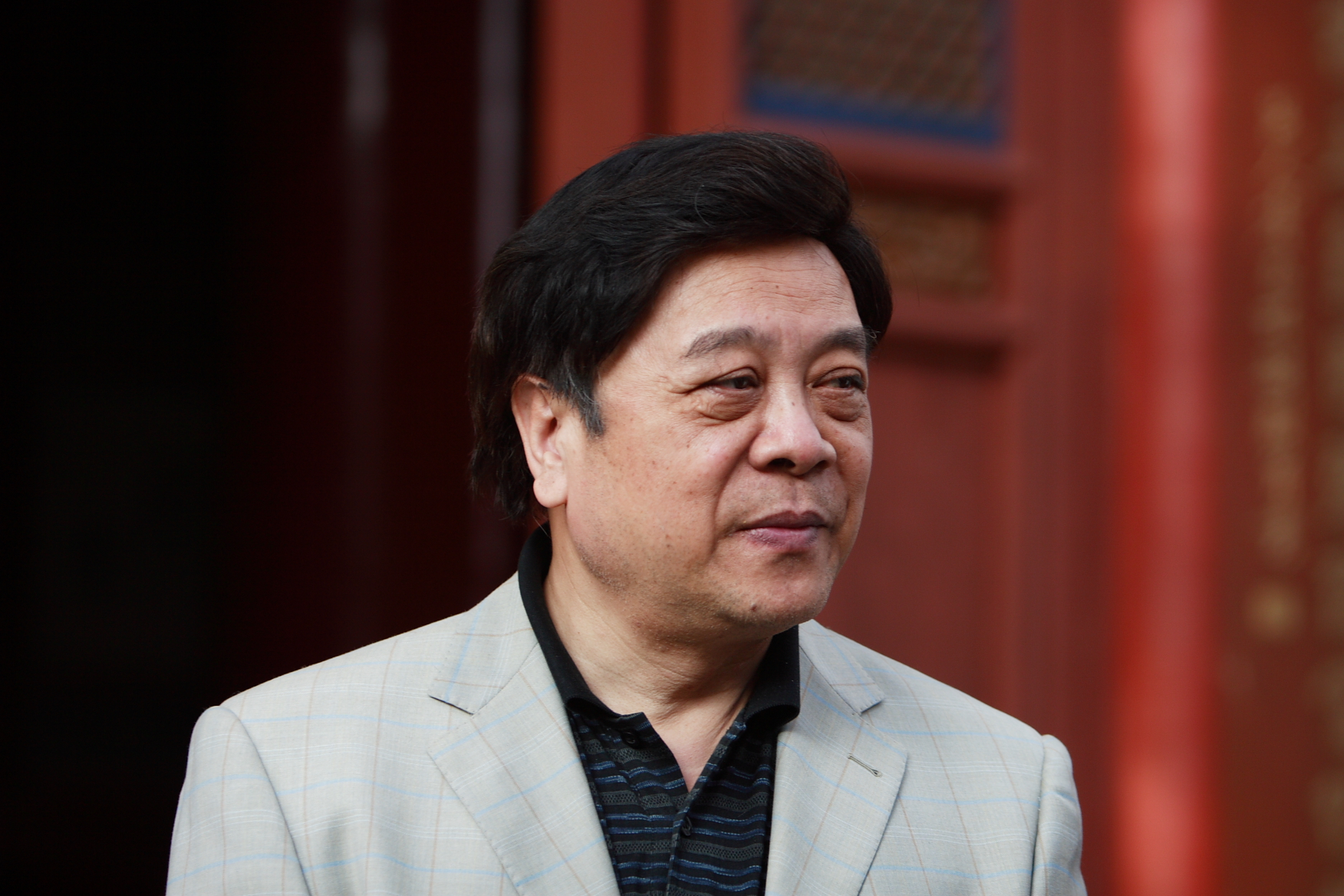
- Zhao Zhongxiang

Member of the Chinese People's Political Consultative Conference (8th, 9th, 10th)
- In office March 1993 – March 2008
- Chairman: Li Ruihuan; Jia Qinglin

Personal details
- Born: January 16, 1942 Ningjin County, Hebei, China
- Died: January 16, 2020 (aged 78) Haidian, Beijing, China

Chinese name
- Traditional Chinese: 趙忠祥
- Simplified Chinese: 赵忠祥
Transcriptions
Standard Mandarin
- Hanyu Pinyin: Zhào Zhōngxiáng

Zhao Zhongxiang (Chinese: 赵忠祥; 16 January 1942 – 16 January 2020) was a well-known Chinese news anchor on the national news program Xinwen Lianbo and television host. He joined China Central Television in 1959.

== Biography ==
Zhao was born in Ningjin County, Hebei in 1942. He was a host of the CCTV New Year's Gala. He presented programs like Animal World (动物世界 Dongwu shijie) and spoke out on environmental issues such as the protection of endangered tigers and the noise pollution caused by firecrackers.

In 2001 it was announced that he was to be one of 36 athletes and celebrities to be featured on stamps issued in support of Beijing's application for the 2008 Olympics. He also went through a sex scandal with CCTV doctor Rao Ying, with whom he allegedly had a seven-year relationship.

Zhao died in Beijing on 16 January 2020, his 78th birthday.

== Career ==
On July 12, 2010, after two years' of retirement, Zhao Zhongxiang returned to CCTV to broadcast his most famous programs Animal World (Chinese: 动物世界) and Human and Nature (Chinese: 人与自然). What's more, Zhao was also invited to dub for an Expo-related program called World Expo legendary (Chinese: 世博传奇).

== Personal life ==
Zhao Zhongxiang's wife was Zhang Meizhu. They had a son named Zhao Fang.
