= Cheung Ming-man =

Hong Kong singer (born 1956)

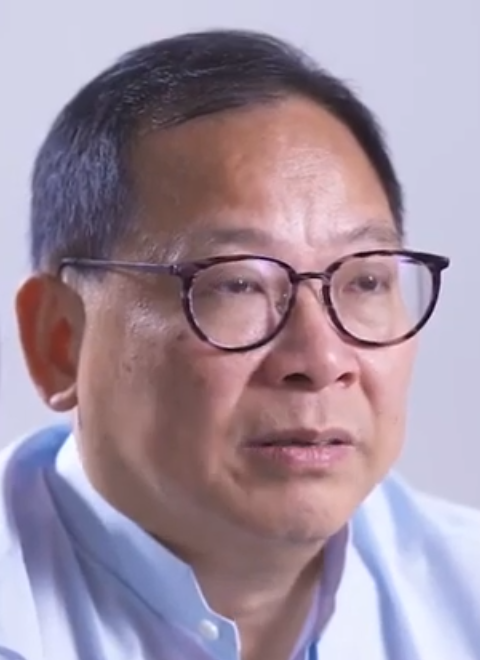
- Cheung in 2018
- Traditional Chinese: 張明敏
- Simplified Chinese: 张明敏
Transcriptions
Standard Mandarin
- Hanyu Pinyin: Zhāng Míngmǐn
Yue: Cantonese
- Jyutping: zoeng^{1} ming^{4}man^{5}

Cheung Ming-man (Chinese: 張明敏; born 2 September 1956) is a Hong Kong singer and occasional actor, best known for many patriotic songs he sang in the 1980s, all in Mandarin. He became the first Hong Kong singer to sing at the CCTV New Year's Gala, China's most-watched TV event, when he performed his song "My Chinese Heart" at the 1984 event. The song made him an instant superstar nationally.

== Filmography ==
- Danger Has Two Faces (1985) as Man
- The Swordsman (1990) as Luk Ta Yau
- Made in Heaven (1997)
