= Li Yong (television host) =

Chinese television host

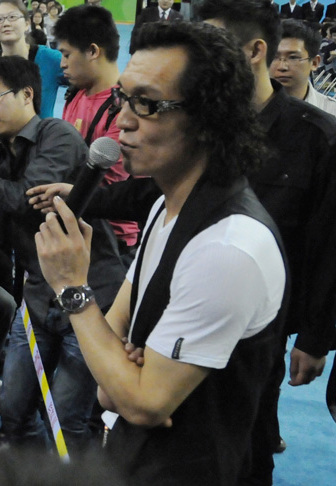
- University of Science and Technology Beijing Famous Forum "Yong Yuan has Li" - Li Yong Special Session, University of Science and Technology Beijing Gymnasium
- Born: 3 May 1968; Urumqi, Xinjiang, China
- Died: 25 October 2018 (aged 50); New York City, New York, United States
- Education: Beijing Broadcasting Institute
- Occupation: Television presenter
- Employer: CCTV
- Political party: Chinese Communist Party
- Spouse: Ha Wen (m. 1992)
- Children: Fatima Li (b. 2002)

Li Yong (Chinese: 李咏; pinyin: Lǐ Yǒng; 3 May 1968 – 25 October 2018) was a leading host on China Central Television (CCTV). He was known for hosting the programs Lucky 52 and Super 6+1, as well as various editions of the CCTV New Year's Gala. He was known for his unorthodox presentation skills and flamboyant outfits.

== Biography ==
Li's family originated from Shandong, but he was born and raised in Urumqi, Xinjiang, in the far-west part of China. As a child, he was interested in painting. He excelled in the National College Entrance Examination and planned to become an actor. From 1987 he studied radio at the then Beijing Broadcasting Institute, where he began dating Ha Wen. The two subsequently married; Ha has both produced Li's programmes for CCTV and been his publicist. Li was a member of the Chinese Communist Party. After graduating, he joined CCTV's in 1991 as a choreographer. While he also worked in news, he made his name in light entertainment. He lived in central Beijing and the couple had a daughter born in 2002.

Since 2001, he had been one of the six main hosts of the CCTV New Year's Gala, which had a regular audience estimated at several hundred million people each year. He was often used in on-screen and printed promotional material as the public face of CCTV.

Li was launched to fame by Lucky 52, a CCTV-2 gameshow with audience figures around 50 million. Based on a British gameshow format (possibly Who Wants to Be a Millionaire?). The show aired on Saturdays at 6:55 pm. The last air was 25 October 2008 and its repeats, as Li announced/CCTV announced that Lucky 52 would go off air.

He then added Super 6+1, another gameshow broadcast on CCTV-2 on weekend evenings after Xinwen Lianbo. A spin-off talent competition named Chinese Dream was aired during the October 2005 National Holiday, as CCTV attempted to respond to the success of rival Hunan TV's Super Girl. Despite the support of SARFT, which was alleged to have clamped down on rival programmes, the programme was considered a relatively failure and was folded back into Super 6+1.

The World Brand Laboratory has recognized Li as the top TV host in China since their ranking began in 2004. His worth to CCTV was estimated at ¥500 million (at 2007 rates, £33m or US$66m). The 2005 ranking described him as unconventional, "humorous and intelligent".

He was known for his flamboyant image and his looks, which were described as unconventional and even ugly. His on-screen dress was often formal men's attire with such modifications as sequins and brightly coloured linings. His hair was longer than was conventional for Chinese men of his age and status. The 2005 ranking noted his tendency to laugh in front of the camera, at his own jokes.

On 23 June 2016, it was announced that he would be the new presenter of The Voice of China, which would be entitled "Sing! China – 中国好声音".

On 29 October 2018, Li's wife Ha Wen revealed that he died in the United States on 25 October 2018 after a 17-month-battle with cancer. His funeral was held at the Frank E. Campbell Funeral Chapel in New York City.

== Controversies ==
In September 2006, Li appeared in an advertising campaign for Sunyard product of the Zhejiang Shiyou Timber Co. Ltd. The CCTV editorial committee omitted him from their "top ten" list for 2006, perhaps suggesting diminishing support within the organization's management. The original incident later prompted an investigation by CCTV's disciplinary inspection department, on the grounds that it breached SARFT guidelines. Ha denied that Li had endorsed the product, while admitting that he had attended a corporate publicity event for the produce.

On 12 January 2007, Li implied Shaanxi citizens were "lazy" on Lucky 52, prompting criticism on China's influential bulletin boards. He subsequently apologized on his blog. In the 2007 CCTV New Year's Gala, Li and other hosts made a series of mistakes just before midnight, giving rise to the infamous "Black Three Minutes".

The mounting pressure led to rumours in September 2007 that Li had resigned from CCTV. They were denied by Lucky 52. He did resign a year later, and the show went off air on 25 October 2008. After a two-year absence, Li returned to CCTV in 2011 to host the CCTV New Year's Gala. His wife Ha Wen was the director of the Gala in 2012, 2013, and 2015.
