= Xintianyou =

Chinese folk music genre

Xintianyou (Chinese: 信天游; pinyin: xìntiānyóu) is a folk music style from Shaanxi province. The name literally means "rambling in the sky." The style was originally sung and developed by porters carrying goods to far off regions. One of the most famous songs in this style is "Lan Huahua" (藍花花).
