= Qinghai Television =

Chinese television network

Qinghai Television (QHTV)
- Type: Broadcast
- Country: China
- Official website: http://www.qhtv.com/

Qinghai Television (QHTV) (Chinese: 青海卫视; pinyin: Qīnghǎi Wèishì) is a television network under Hunan Broadcasting System (HBS) in the Xining city and Qinghai province area. It was founded on January 1, 1971. QHTV currently broadcasts in Chinese, Mongolian, Tibetan and Salar.

== Programming ==
- Kunlun Fight (2014)
