= Lucky 52 =

1998 Chinese television series

- 幸运52
- Presented by: Li Yong
- Country of origin: China

Production
- Running time: about 50 minutes per episode (excl. commercials)

Original release
- Network: CCTV-2
- Release: November 1998 – October 25, 2008

Lucky 52 (Simplified Chinese: 幸运52) is a variety show on CCTV-2, hosted by Li Yong. It was premiered in November 1998 and used the format of GoBingo. Due to the reformation of the channel, the last episode of the show aired on October 25, 2008.

== Format changes ==
This show changed its format for several times, although the name of the show remained unchanged. The following are some of the formats used by the show.

=== Lucky Classroom (幸运课堂) ===
(June 1, 2007 - February 17, 2008)

Similar to Are You Smarter Than a 5th Grader?. The contestant had to answer 9 primary school level questions, 1,000 Renminbi would be awarded to the contestant for each question answered correctly. The contestant had up to 3 chances to get help from the primary school students by using the "cheats": 参考 (peek), 借用 (copy) and 双保险 (save), but if the contestant answers correctly by using the "cheats", no prize would be awarded for that question but they could continue playing. The contestant could give up during the game and take the money ("drop out"). If the contestant answered incorrectly, he/she couldn't continue playing and would win nothing ("flunk out"). The contestant could enter the "graduation exam" if they finished all 9 questions, 30,000 Renminbi would be awarded if they passed the "exam".

Since August 24, 2007, the values of each question were as the table below. Later, the number of questions before the "exam" increased to 10.

Question (earlier version)		1	2	3	4	5	6	7	8	9	"Graduation exam"
Question (later version)	1	2	3	4	5	6	7	8	9	10	"Graduation exam"
Prize (Renminbi)	¥500	¥800	¥1,500	¥3,000	¥4,500	¥6,000	¥8,000	¥10,000	¥12,000	¥15,000	¥30,000

From January 2008, the contestant's performance was calculated in marks instead of money amount in order to make the game more similar to the examinations in school. Each question worth 10 marks, the contestant could get the maximum of 100 marks if they answer all 10 questions correctly. They must get at least 6 questions right (i.e. to get at least 60 mark) to pass the "examination".

=== Lucky Cases (幸运箱) ===
(June 1 - August 17, 2007)

After playing "Lucky Classroom", the contestant could play this game despite he/she won or lost. There were 12 models, each carried a "lucky case" contained a gift worth between 1 and 500 Renminbi (between 1 and 300 Renminbi later). Then a number of cases would be eliminated, that number equals to number of correct answers of the contestant in "Lucky Classroom" (for example, the contestant who answered 4 questions correctly in "Lucky Classroom" could eliminates 4 lucky cases), but the cases contain the smallest and largest values would not be eliminated. The contestant would then choose one of the remaining cases, the gift in that case would be given to the audience in the studio. The sound effects from the American version of Deal or No Deal were used in this game.

=== Which Family is Smarter? (谁家更聪明) ===
(February 24 - October 25, 2008)

Similar to Family Feud. Two families would compete for several rounds in each episode, the winning family could enter the last round. Two members of the family would participate in the last round, one of them would answer 10 questions in 100 seconds, then the other one would answer the same 10 questions in the remaining time of the first player. If the second player gave the same answer as the first player on a question, 20,000 Renminbi (later increased to 50,000 but back to 20,000 in the last episode) would be donated to a charity. The maximum donation of each episode was originally 100,000 Renminbi, later increased to 200,000, then 500,000, but decreased to 200,000 in the last episode.
