= Dong Wenhua =

Chinese singer

- 董文华
- Born: June 29, 1962 (age 63); Shenyang, Liaoning Province, China
- Education: People's Liberation Army Academy of Arts, China Conservatory of Music
- Occupation: Singer
- Employer(s): Song and Dance Troupe of the Political Work Department of the Central Military Commission
- Political party: Chinese Communist Party

Dong Wenhua (born June 29, 1962) is a Chinese singer of the People's Liberation Army. "Moon of the Fifteenth", "Story of Spring", as well as many other songs of hers were popular to the youth generation of the 1980s and the early 1990s. In America, she has performed at both Lincoln Center and Carnegie Hall.
