= Ma Ji =

Chinese xiangsheng comedian

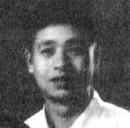
- Born: 2 August 1934; Tianjin, China
- Died: 20 December 2006 (aged 72); Beijing, China
- Occupation: Xiangsheng performer
- Children: Ma Dong (son)

Chinese name
- Traditional Chinese: 馬季
- Simplified Chinese: 马季
Transcriptions
Standard Mandarin
- Hanyu Pinyin: Mǎ Jì

Ma Ji (traditional Chinese: 馬季; simplified Chinese: 马季; pinyin: Mǎ Jì; 2 August 1934 – 20 December 2006), born Ma Shuhuai (simplified Chinese: 马树槐; traditional Chinese: 馬樹槐; pinyin: Mǎ Shùhuái), was a Chinese xiangsheng comedian. He was one of his generation's most popular and influential xiangsheng performers and was mentor to many younger performers, including Jiang Kun, Zhao Yan, Liu Wei, Feng Gong, Xiaolin, Wang Qianxiang, Li Zengrui, Han Lancheng, Liu Xiyao, Peng Ziyi, Yin Zhuolin, Yao Xinguang, Zhao Longjun, Xing Yingying, Liu Lixin, and Hou Guannan.

== Biography ==
Ma was born in Tianjin on 2 August 1934. After the Communists took over mainland China, Ma started to work in Xinhua bookstore. He joined the Central Broadcasting Recitation and Ballad Troupe as a professional xiangsheng performer in 1956. He studied under Hou Baolin and became a seventh-generation xiangsheng performer. He got his stage name Ma from the film Mattie the Goose-boy (1950 film), which is based on the poem of the same name by Mihály Fazekas.

As a notable xiangsheng master and performer, Ma created his own art style and made great contributions to China's Xiangsheng art.

In the mid to late 1980s, together with his disciple Zhao Yan, he frequently travelled to Singapore on performance tours and proved to be very popular there as well.

Ma was also a member of the 5th Chinese People's Political Consultative Conference.

Ma died of a heart attack on 20 December 2006 at Beijing, China.

== Famous works ==
1. "Ode to Mountain Climbers"
2. "The Portrait"
3. "Dispute of the Five Sense Organs"
4. Performed with many comedians together in “Five Officers Contend for Fame”

=== Dialogues ===
1. Ode to Friendship
2. Storm on the State
3. Multistory Restaurant

=== Monlogues ===
1. “The Universal Brand Cigarette” playing a cigarette salesman with a bad product and satirizing newly rich Chinese preoccupation with brand names.
