= Mi Na =

Mi Na may refer to:

- Mi Na (painter) (born 1980), Chinese painter
- Mi Na (athlete) (born 1986), Paralympian athlete from China

== See also ==
- Son Mi-Na (born 1964), South Korean handball player
- Mina (disambiguation)
- Na-mi
