= My Chinese Heart =

1982 Chinese patriotic song

"My Chinese Heart" (Chinese: 我的中国心) is a Chinese patriotic song. The lyrics were written by James Wong in 1982 in protest of the falsifying of information on the Second Sino-Japanese War in Japanese History books by the Japanese Ministry of Education, as well as to disseminate Chinese nationalism. Wang Fulin composed the song and Cheung Ming-man was brought to fame for being its first singer. The song discusses the nature of Chinese identity, as well as the struggles and necessity of maintaining Chinese culture among the diaspora. It is a particularly well known piece among the diaspora community, and is viewed alongside The Great Wall Ballad as the de facto anthem of the Chinese diaspora. The song, which was released during the reform and opening up, also served to remind the Chinese population of their own identity during a period of increasing foreign influence.
