= Feng Gong =

Chinese actor, xiangsheng performer, director, screenwriter and politician

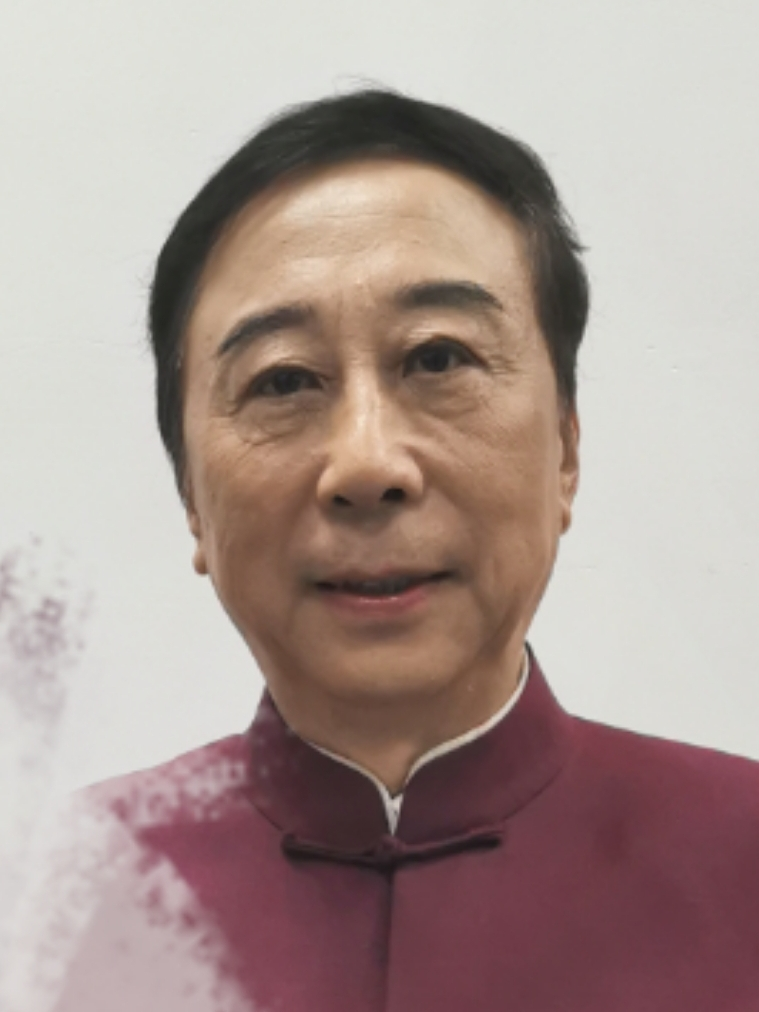
- Feng Gong in December 2019

Vice Chairman of the Revolutionary Committee of the Chinese Kuomintang
- Incumbent
- Assumed office December 2017
- Chairman: Wan Exiang; Zheng Jianbang

Member of the Chinese People's Political Consultative Conference (9th, 10th, 13th)
- Incumbent
- Assumed office March 2018
- Chairman: Wang Yang
- In office March 1998 – March 2008
- Chairman: Li Ruihuan; Jia Qinglin

Members of the Standing Committee of the CPPCC (11th, 12th)
- In office March 2008 – March 2018
- Chairman: Jia Qinglin; Yu Zhengsheng

Personal details
- Born: Feng Mingguang (冯明光); 6 December 1957 (age 68) Tianjin, China
- Party: Revolutionary Committee of the Chinese Kuomintang
- Spouse: Ai Hui (m. 1983)
- Children: Feng Kaicheng (son)
- Parent(s): Feng Haigang; Liu Yisu
- Relatives: Feng Guozhang (Great grandfather); Feng Jiayu (grandfather)
- Education: Central China Normal University
- Occupation: Xiangsheng performer, actor, film director, and screenwriter
- Years active: 1973–present
- Family: Feng Xingyun; Feng Xin; Feng Chuanshu

Chinese name
- Traditional Chinese: 馮鞏
- Simplified Chinese: 冯巩
Transcriptions
Standard Mandarin
- Hanyu Pinyin: Féng Gǒng

Feng Gong (simplified Chinese: 冯巩; traditional Chinese: 馮鞏; pinyin: Féng Gǒng; born 6 December 1957) is a Chinese actor, xiangsheng performer, director, screenwriter and politician. He is best known for his performances in the annual CCTV New Year's Gala, having made more appearances on the show than every other major performer.

== Biography ==
Feng Gong was born Feng Mingguang (冯明光) in Tianjin, China, on December 6, 1957, the son of Feng Haigang (冯海岗; 1920–1993), a local government official, and Liu Yisu (刘益素; born 1921), a daughter of an eminent family. His great-grandfather is Feng Guozhang, an early Republic-era warlord and the founder of the Zhili Clique, who once served as the President of the Republic of China between 1917 and 1918. He has an elder sister Feng Xingyun (冯幸耘; born 1947) and two elder brothers Feng Xin (冯信) and Feng Chuanshu (冯传书).

Feng graduated from Central China Normal University with a master's degree in Chinese Literature. In 1973, he performed a famous xiangsheng named Zunshi ai tudi (尊师爱徒弟) in Tianjin. Then he started to learn the arts of xiangsheng from the xiangsheng master Ma Ji. He also worked in a textiles machine factory. Feng was considered more talented than many other students of Ma Ji, and eventually emerged as a new star, performing progressively to bigger venues. Niu Qun (牛群) and Liu Wei (刘伟) were his partners when performing xiangsheng.

Feng appeared in the first CCTV New Year's Gala in 1986; he has appeared at almost every Chunwan performance for the next thirty years, variably in skits and xiangsheng. Feng is usually one of the first acts of the show; it is said he appears earlier in the program so that he can drive home to Tianjin to spend midnight on new year with his mother.

In 1988, he won the championship at the competition of xiangsheng performances in Dalian held by China Central Television.

== Political career ==
On December 24, 2017, Feng was elected as the vice chairman of the Revolutionary Committee of the Chinese Kuomintang. He was re-elected as the vice chairman on December 6, 2022.

On October 12, 2018, Feng was elected as the new chairman of the China Literary and Art Volunteers' Association (中国文艺志愿者协会; CLAVA) by its 2nd National Congress.

== Personal life ==
Feng is the great-grandson of Feng Guozhang (1859-1919), once the president of the Republic of China during the chaotic Warlord era. His grandfather, Feng Jiayu (冯家遇; 1888–1953), was a businessman. Feng himself is a leadership figure in the Revolutionary Committee of the Chinese Kuomintang, one of the eight legally recognized political parties in China, as well as a member of the Chinese People's Political Consultative Conference. He is often accosted by reporters during the annual Lianghui meetings in Beijing due to his celebrity status.

In 1983, Feng Gong married Ai Hui (艾慧) in Tianjin. The couple have a son, Feng Kaicheng (冯开诚), born in 1984.

== Filmography ==
=== Film ===
Year	English title	Chinese title	Role	Ref.
1987	Unprofessional Policeman	业余警察	He Dazhuang	
1987	Xiao Po Qing Wang	笑破情网		
1990	The Contract of the Divorce	离婚合同	Liu Liu	
1992	Stand On	站直啰！别趴下	Poet reader	
1994	Kiss Russia	狂吻俄罗斯	Da Jiang	
1997	Surveillance	埋伏	Ye Xinmin	
1998	A Tree in House	没事偷着乐	Zhang Damin	
2001	The Marriage Certificate	谁说我不在乎	Gu Ming	
2004	When Dreams Come True	梦想成真		
2005	Eat Hot Tofu Slowly	心急吃不了热豆腐	Liu Hao	
2005	No Thieves can be Caught in a Hurry	心急抓不了贼	He Dazhuang	Also as director
2007	A Big Potato	别拿自己不当干部	Wang Xi	Also as director
2007	Getting Home	谁是孩子他爹	Ding Dake	
2008	I'm a Guy, Who am I Afraid Of?	我是爷们我怕谁	Small retailer	
2010	The Founding of a Republic	建国大业	A delegate to the CPPCC	
2011	The Founding of a Party	建党伟业	Feng Guozhang	
2012	All for Love	三个未婚妈妈	A tourist	
2018	Happiness Is Coming	幸福马上来	Ma Shanglai	Also as director and writer

=== TV series ===
Year	English title	Chinese title	Role	Ref.
1990	The True Story of Ah O	阿O正传		Not Ah Q
1989	Na Wu	那五	Na Wu	
1996	Actually, Men are the most overworked	其实男人最辛苦	Ding Dake	
2012	Life Is Sweet	生活有点甜	Tang Xi	

== Film and TV Awards ==
Year	Nominated work	Award	Category	Result	Ref.
1993	Stand On	16th Hundred Flowers Award	Best Supporting Actor	Won	
1997	Ambush	17th China Golden Rooster Award	Best Actor	Nominated	
1998	A Tree in House	18th China Golden Rooster Award	Best Actor	Won	
1999	A Tree in House	9th Shanghai Film Critics Awards	Shanghai Film Critics Award for Best Actor	Won	

Cultural offices
Preceded by Jiang Kun	Chairman of the China Literary and Art Volunteers' Association; 2018	Incumbent
