= Jiang Kun (comedian) =

Chinese comedian (born 1950)

- 姜昆
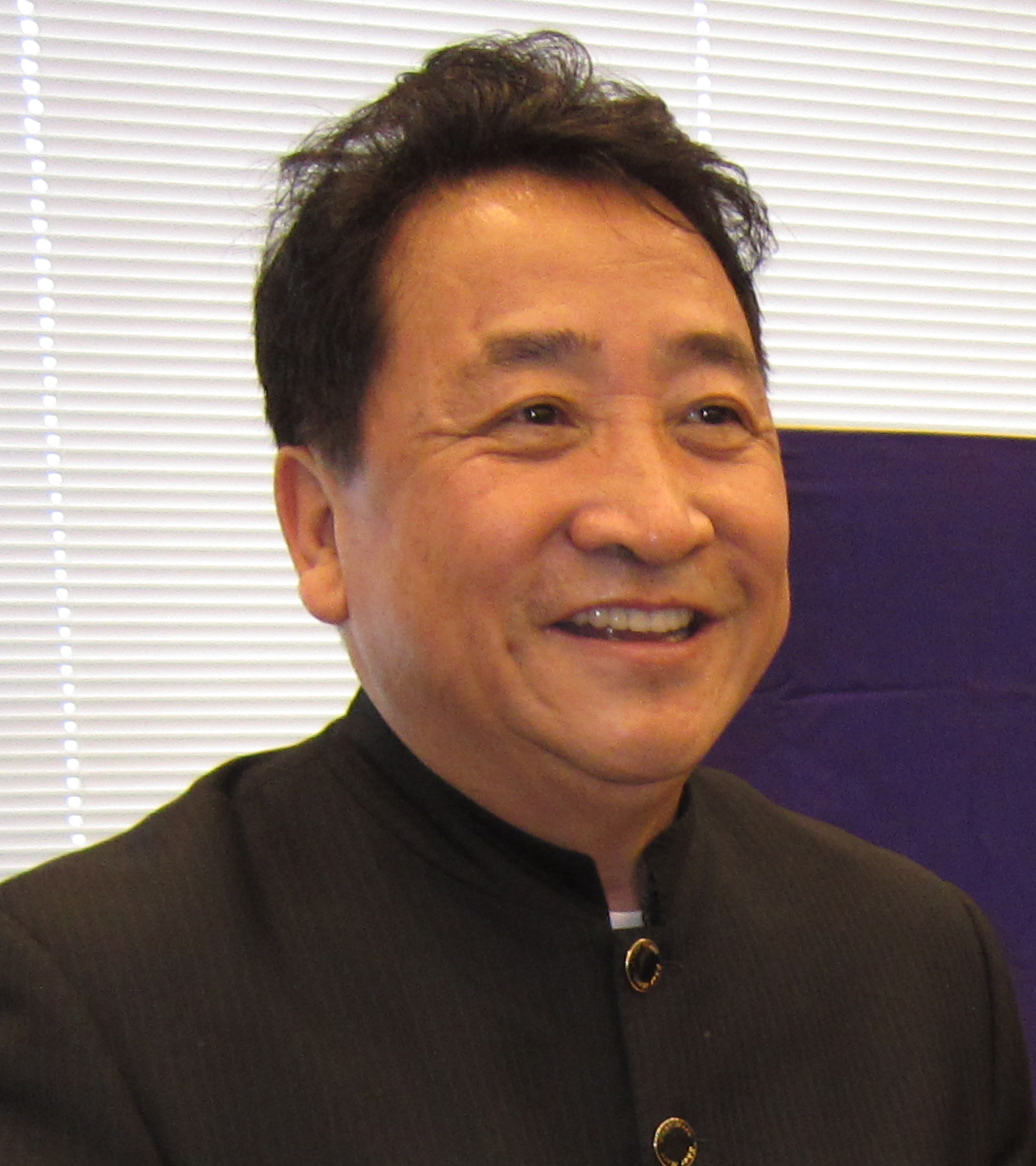
- Jiang in 2011
- Born: October 19, 1950 (age 76); Beijing, China
- Education: Open University of China
- Occupation: Xiangsheng performer
- Years active: 1976–present

Jiang Kun (Chinese: 姜昆; pinyin: Jiāng Kūn; born October 19, 1950) is a Chinese comedian, specializing in the xiangsheng trade. A native of Beijing, he was a disciple of another renowned comedian, Ma Ji. Jiang Kun currently acts as deputy chairman of the Association of Chinese Folk Art.

== Biography ==
Jiang was born in Beijing, on 19 October 1950. His grandfather Jiang Zongli (姜宗礼) was born in Yantai, Shandong. In order to escape famine, he came to Beijing and set up a steamed bread shop. Later he opened a restaurant called "Tong Fu Zhai" (同福斋). Jiang's father Jiang Zuyu (姜祖禹; 1924–1989) was a calligrapher, he studied calligraphy under Zhang Boying (张伯英) and Hua Shikui (华世奎). Jiang Kun has two uncles and one sister, Jiang Zuming (姜祖明), Jiang Zuyuan (姜祖元) and Jiang Shuzhen (姜淑珍).

In 1976, he was transferred to the Central Radio Broadcasting Backstage Rap Group, whilst studying under Ma Ji. In 1985, Jiang Kun was elected vice-chairman of the Chinese Ballad Singers Association. In the same year, he replaced his mentor Ma Ji, and took on the duties as the Head of the China Radio Broadcasting Rap Group, and was also elected a member of the Standing Committee of the China Youth Federation. In recent years, Kun has been a regular performer on prominent events such as the CCTV New Year's Gala, the largest annual television event in the world (by viewership).

== Personal life ==
Jiang married Li Jingmin (Chinese: 李静民), the couple has a daughter named Jiang Shan (Chinese: 姜珊; born 1979).

== Famous works ==
- "Drunken"
- "Injections"
- "Anxious"
- "Learning to sing"
- "Elevators Adventure"
- "Poetry and Love"
- "So Camera"
- "I am a little dizzy"
- "Big News"
- "Best Network"

== Awards ==
On February 11, 2007, Jiang Kun was awarded the World Outstanding Chinese Award.

== Filmography ==
He has starred in the 2008 Chinese documentary, "震撼世界的七日" (loosely translated as The World Shook in 7 Days).

- The Galaxy on Earth (2014)

Cultural offices
Previous: New position	Chairman of the China Literary and Art Volunteers' Association; 2013-2018	Next: Feng Gong
