= Jesse Appell =

American comedian and author

Jesse Appell (Ai Jiexi (艾杰西) is an American comedian who performs for Chinese and Chinese American audiences, combining traditional Xiangsheng and American-style standup.

== Early life and education ==
Originally from Boston, Massachusetts, Appell went to Brandeis University where he joined the Global China Connection (GCC) and regularly performed stand-up comedy.

== Career ==
In 2012, Appell started on his journey with Xiangsheng. He went to China in September 2012 to study Chinese at Tsinghua University as a Fulbright Scholar. There, he improved his Chinese and was awarded the Critical Language Enhancement Award (CLEA). As part of his Fulbright Scholarship, he studied Xiangsheng with a master of the craft, Ding Guangquan (丁广泉). Appell founded a comedy center, LaughBeijing, that hosted over 300 shows per year in Beijing from 2016 to 2020. His work helped bring aspects of Western-style stand-up comedy to China. He viewed himself as a cultural ambassador, combining his talents with the power of the Internet to help U.S.-China relations and bridge cultural gaps.

Appell's 2026 book This Was Funnier in China: An American Comedian's Cross-Cultural Journey described how he built his comedy career, reaching over a million followers on Douyin.
