= Lyrics =

Set of words that accompany an instrumental

Lyrics in sheet music. This is a homorhythmic (i.e., hymn-style) arrangement of a traditional piece entitled "Adeste Fideles" (the original Latin lyrics to "O Come, All Ye Faithful") in standard two-staff format for mixed voices.

Lyrics are words that make up a song, usually consisting of verses and choruses. The writer of lyrics is a lyricist. The words to an extended musical composition such as an opera are, however, usually known as a "libretto" and their writer, as a "librettist". Rap songs and grime contain rap lyrics (often with a variation of rhyming words) that are meant to be spoken rhythmically rather than sung. The meaning of lyrics can either be explicit or implicit. Some lyrics are abstract, almost unintelligible, and, in such cases, their explication emphasizes form, articulation, meter, and symmetry of expression.

== Etymology ==
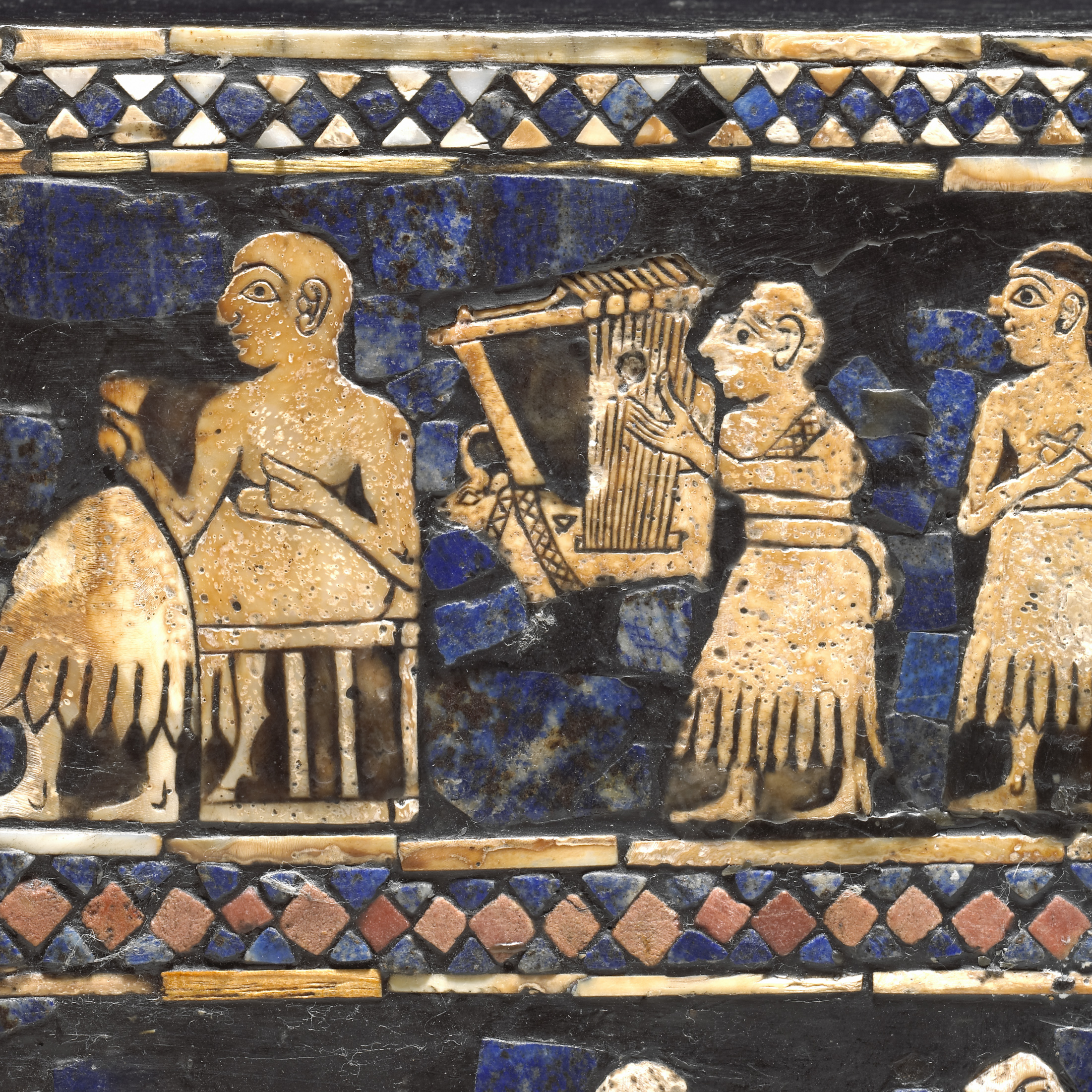
A lyrist on the Standard of Ur, c. 2500 BC

The word lyric derives via Latin lyricus from the Greek λυρικός (lurikós), the adjectival form of lyre. It first appeared in English in the mid-16th century in reference to the Earl of Surrey's translations of Petrarch and to his own sonnets. Greek lyric poetry had been defined by the manner in which it was sung accompanied by the lyre or cithara, as opposed to the chanted formal epics or the more passionate elegies accompanied by the flute. The personal nature of many of the verses of the Nine Lyric Poets led to the present sense of "lyric poetry" but the original Greek sense of "lyric poetry"—"poetry accompanied by the lyre" i.e. "words set to music"—eventually led to its use as "lyrics", first attested in Stainer and Barrett's 1876 Dictionary of Musical Terms. Stainer and Barrett used the word as a singular substantive: "Lyric, poetry or blank verse intended to be set to music and sung". By the 1930s, the present use of the plurale tantum "lyrics" had begun; it has been standard since the 1950s for many writers. The singular form "lyric" is still used to mean the complete words to a song by authorities such as Alec Wilder, Robert Gottlieb, and Stephen Sondheim. However, the singular form is also commonly used to refer to a specific line (or phrase) within a song's lyrics.

In Baroque music, melodies and their lyrics were prose. Rather than paired lines they consist of rhetorical sentences or paragraphs consisting of an opening gesture, an amplification (often featuring sequence), and a close (featuring a cadence); in German Vordersatz-Fortspinnung-Epilog. For example:

When I was a child,
I spoke as a child,
I understood as a child,
I thought as a child;
But when I became a man, I put away childish things.
— 1 Corinthians 13:11

Translation:

[opening gesture]
[amplification...]
[...]
[...]
[close]

== Shifter ==
In the lyrics of popular music, a "shifter" is a word, often a pronoun, "where reference varies according to who is speaking, when and where", such as "I", "you", "my", "our".

== Copyright and royalties ==
As of 2021, there are many websites featuring song lyrics. This offering, however, is controversial, since some sites include copyrighted lyrics offered without the holder's permission. The U.S. Music Publishers Association (MPA), which represents sheet music companies, launched a legal campaign against such websites in December 2005. The MPA's president, Lauren Keiser, said the free lyrics web sites are "completely illegal" and wanted some website operators jailed.

Lyrics licenses could be obtained worldwide through one of the two aggregators: LyricFind and Musixmatch. The first company to provide licensed lyrics was Yahoo!, quickly followed by MetroLyrics. Several lyric websites are providing licensed lyrics, such as SongMeanings and LyricWiki (defunct as of 2020).

Many competing lyrics web sites are still offering unlicensed content, causing challenges around the legality and accuracy of lyrics. In an attempt to crack down unlicensed lyrics web sites, a U.S. federal court has ordered LiveUniverse, a network of websites run by MySpace co-founder Brad Greenspan, to cease operating four sites offering unlicensed song lyrics.

== Academic study ==
Lyrics can be studied from an academic perspective. For example, some lyrics can be considered a form of social commentary. Lyrics often contain political, social, and economic themes—as well as aesthetic elements—and so can communicate culturally significant messages. These messages can be explicit, or implied through metaphor or symbolism. Lyrics can also be analyzed with respect to the sense of unity (or lack of unity) it has with its supporting music. Analysis based on tonality and contrast are particular examples. Former Oxford Professor of Poetry Christopher Ricks famously published Dylan's Visions of Sin, an in-depth and characteristically Ricksian analysis of the lyrics of Bob Dylan; Ricks gives the caveat that to have studied the poetry of the lyrics in tandem with the music would have made for a much more complicated critical feat.

A 2025 study, which analyzed over 20,000 lyrics of songs in the US Top 100 charts, found a "significant increase in stress-related language, alongside declines in positive sentiment and lyrical complexity over five decades."

== Search engines ==
=== Search risk ===
A 2009 report published by McAfee found that, in terms of potential exposure to malware, lyrics-related searches and searches containing the word "free" are the most likely to have risky results from search engines, both in terms of average risk of all results, and maximum risk of any result.

=== Google ===
Beginning in late 2014, Google changed its search results pages to include song lyrics. When users search for a name of a song, Google can now display the lyrics directly in the search results page. When users search for a specific song's lyrics, most results show the lyrics directly through a Google search by using Google Play.

== See also ==
- Lyricist, a writer of lyrics
- Libretto, the "little book" of an extended musical piece, written by a librettist
- "Singing in the Spirit", vocal improvisation in a spiritual context
- Scat singing & Vocalese, vocal improvisation in jazz
- bol, kouji, beatbox, forms of vocal mimicry or percussion
