= Mongolian beef =

Taiwanese beef dish

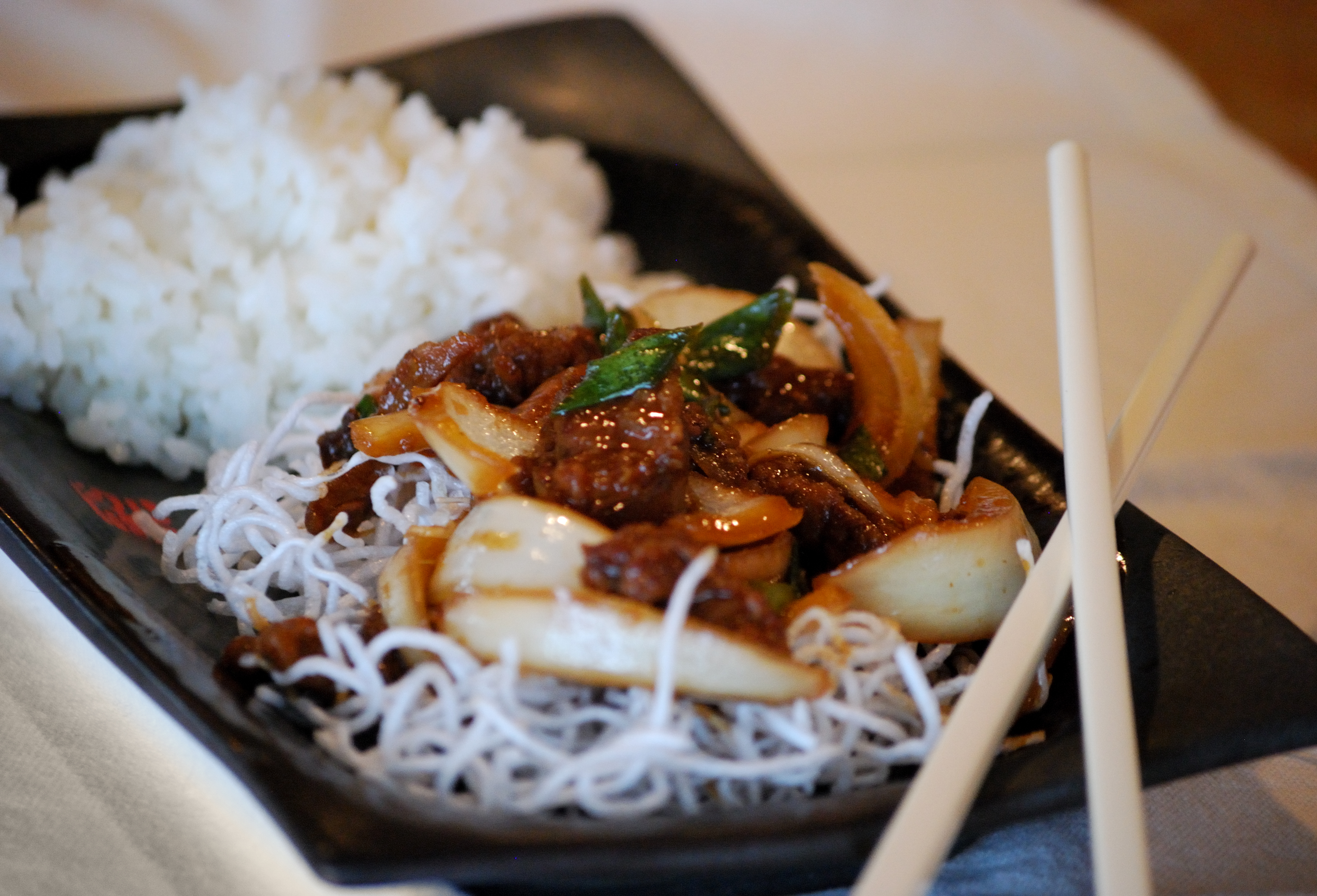
- A plate of Mongolian beef with noodles and rice
- Course: Main course
- Place of origin: Taiwan
- Region or state: East Asia, North America
- Serving temperature: Hot
- Main ingredients: Flank steak, brown sauce (hoisin, soy), vegetables (usually broccoli), rice or rice noodles

Mongolian beef
- Chinese: 蒙古牛肉
Transcriptions
Standard Mandarin
- Hanyu Pinyin: Měnggǔ niúròu
- Wade–Giles: Mêng²-ku³ niu²-jou⁴

Mongolian beef is a dish from Taiwan consisting of sliced beef, typically flank steak, usually made with onions. The beef is commonly paired with scallions or mixed vegetables and is often not spicy. The dish is often served over steamed rice, or in the US, over crispy fried cellophane noodles. It is a staple dish of American Chinese restaurants. Despite its name, the dish has nothing to do with Mongolian cuisine.

Mongolian beef is among the meat dishes developed in Taiwan where Mongolian barbecue restaurants first appeared. Thus, none of the ingredients or the preparation methods are drawn from traditional Mongolian cuisine but rather from Chinese cuisine. A variation is known as Mongolian lamb which substitutes lamb for the beef in the dish.

== History and origin ==
Mongolian beef originated in Taiwan during the 1950s, where it was invented at Mongolian barbecue restaurants. The concept of Mongolian barbecue was created by Wu Zhaonan, a Taiwanese comedian and restaurateur originally from Beijing. After fleeing to Taiwan during the Chinese Civil War, Wu opened a street food stall in Yingqiao, Taipei, in 1951. He initially wanted to name his cooking style "Beijing barbecue", but due to political sensitivities, he instead chose "Mongolian barbecue", despite having no connection to Mongolia. It is also believed to be chosen for marketing purposes to cultivate an exotic appeal around his establishment.

Mongolian barbecue restaurants allows diners to select raw meats, vegetables, and sauces, which were then stir-fried together on a large, flat-top grill. This style reflect Chinese-style beef stir-fries, which emphasize tender cuts and bold savory-sweet sauces, and also draws inspiration from Japanese teppanyaki. One of the most popular combinations was sliced beef stir-fried with soy sauce, garlic, ginger, and brown sugar, which eventually became known as "Mongolian beef". After being introduced to the United States, the dish became a staple of Chinese-American cuisine, typically served with steamed rice or crispy fried glass noodles.

Despite its name, Mongolian beef shares little with traditional Mongolian cuisine, which primarily features meat, dairy, and root vegetables. Traditional dishes like borts (dried meat), dumplings, and hearty stews rely on minimal seasonings and preservation methods suited to Mongolia's harsh climate. Unlike Mongolian beef, typical Mongolian cuisine does not use soy-based sauces or stir-frying methods over high temperatures, which are hallmarks of Chinese cooking.

== See also ==
- Mongolian barbecue
- Taiwanese cuisine
