= Liam Bates =

Swiss TV personality (born 1988)

- Born: 28 June 1988 (age 37); Switzerland
- Occupations: Entrepreneur, Presenter

Liam Bates (Chinese: 李牧; pinyin: lǐmù) is an entrepreneur, television host and adventurer from Switzerland, born 28 June 1988. Bates' first appearance on Chinese television was during the 2010 Chinese Bridge language contest, in which he received first prize and the eloquence prize. The show aired in front of a TV audience of almost 300 million. Bates has gone on to present TV shows for the Discovery Channel and has founded several companies in China. In 2017, Bates made the Forbes 30 under 30 list.

== Early life ==
Liam Bates was born in the canton of Vaud outside Geneva, Switzerland to an American mother and a British-Zimbabwean father. At school he spoke French. He later went on to study Chinese and film at the University of British Columbia in Canada.

== Television career ==
Following Bates' Chinese Bridge success, in September 2010 he joined The Travel Channel China as their newest host, where he began a regular travel series filmed throughout the Chinese countryside. His first shows focused on rural life in Hunan, Guizhou and other Chinese provinces. Each show had Bates spending a week living with farmers and learning about their local cultures.

In 2011 Bates and 'The Travel Channel China' team spent two weeks in his home country of Switzerland, filming several aspects of Swiss life: chocolate-making, Alpine cowherding and cheese production, Swiss military. The resulting television show broke numerous records in China, with the first 30-minute episode registering 1.5 million views on video-sharing website Youku alone. Bates became more widely known in China than in his home country.

In early 2012 Bates began a new series, A Love for Adventure (我爱大冒险) and the Last Tribe (最后的部落). In this show, he travelled around the world seeking out small tribes who have maintained their traditional lifestyles in order to learn their survival techniques. In 2016 Bates completed filming of a new series for the Discovery Channel, "Expedition X: Silk Road Rising".

== Entrepreneur ==
Bates started his first company in 2006 at 17 years old, Beijing-based Bridges to China. In 2014 Bates co-founded Kaiterra (formerly Origins Technology), a startup that develops IoT hardware and software products to measure global air quality and pollution levels. In April 2016, Kaiterra's consumer air quality monitor, the Laser Egg, entered the Apple Stores across China. In 2017, Bates and Kaiterra co-founder Jessica Lam were selected for the Forbes 30 under 30 list.

== Hangzhou Ambassador ==
In May 2013 Bates was officially appointed tourism ambassador to the Chinese city of Hangzhou. Bates was awarded a $55,000/year contract to regularly visit and explore Hangzhou, sharing his experiences on social media under the title of the 'Modern Marco Polo'. This made him the first foreigner ever to be appointed by China's government in such an official role.

== Xiangsheng ==
Bates was formally invited to begin the study of xiangsheng (a traditional form of "crosstalk" comedy) by famous Chinese comedian Ding Guangquan after his success in the Chinese Bridge contest. In February 2012, in a traditional ceremony at the Confucius Institute, University of Hawaii, he was formally accepted into the xiangsheng hierarchy when he took Ding Guangquan to be his Shifu. Today xiangsheng is still a large part of Bates' work, and he performs regularly on China Central Television.

== Other work ==
Bates became known publicly through Chinese Bridge and his travel shows, but he gradually expanded into other activities, including hosting live events and leading outdoors/survival courses. His popularity as a performer and foreign personality on Chinese television has grown steadily: his Chinese microblog has grown to tens of thousands of registered followers in just two years.
