= Trần Quang Đức =

Vietnamese author (born 1985)

- 陳光德
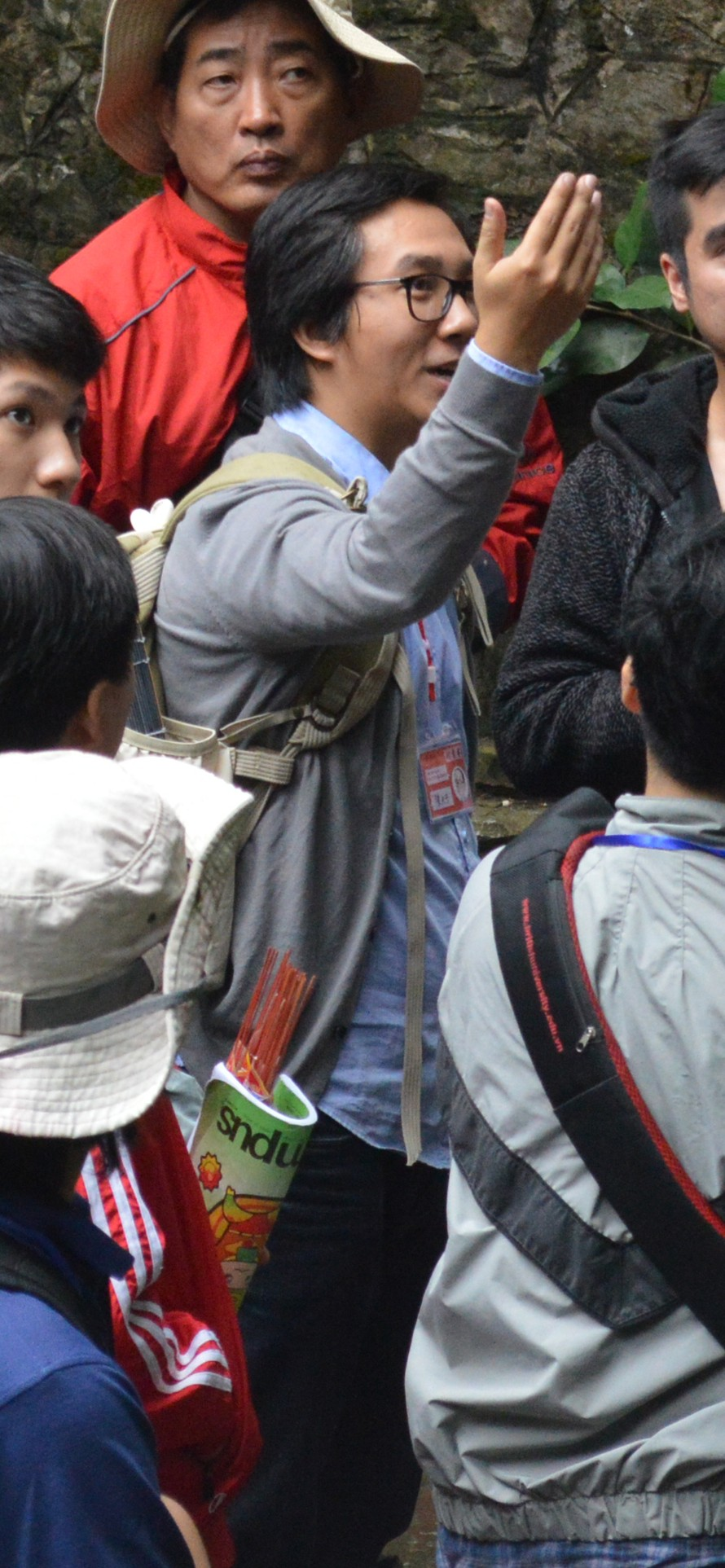
- Trần Quang Đức (centre, raising his hand) at the Thầy Temple (September 2014).
- Born: Trần Quang Đức; 16 May 1985 (age 41); Haiphong, Vietnam
- Education: Vietnam National University; Peking University
- Writing career
- Genre: Sinology
- Notable awards: First prize of Chinese Bridge Competition (2004)

Seal

Trần Quang Đức (Chữ Hán: 陳光德, born 16 May 1985) is a Vietnamese art historian, calligrapher, author, and translator. As an art historian his specialisation is the comparative study of Vietnamese cultural history within the Southeast Asian context.

His 2013 book Ngàn năm áo mũ (“One Thousand Years of Garments”) was awarded the prize "Worthy Book 2014 / New Discovery".

== Biography ==
Trần Quang Đức was born on 16 May 1985 in Haiphong city. He has courtesy names Nam Phong (南風), Tam Uyển (三碗), Thí Phổ' (施普), pen names Nam Quốc Nhân (南國人), An Biên Bachelor (安邊學士), suite names Cao Trai (高齋), Vân Trai (雲齋), literary name Vân Nang (雲囊) and Buddhist name An Biên Attendant (安邊居士).

According to the old narrative, in his mother's 9th-month of pregnancy, she dreamed about visiting the daisy garden and seeing the emerald clouds hovering in the sky with completely silent surroundings. On that occasion, his grandfather named him "Quang Đức". As a child, he learned Hán Nôm under his grandfather's mentorship.

- 2003: Graduate [[Thái Phiên High School, Haiphong|Thái Phiên High School]] in Haiphong; then passing into the University of Social Sciences and Humanities in Hanoi.
- 2004: Win the first prize of Chinese Bridge Competition, its reward was the study abroad at the Peking University. After the graduate, he went back to Hanoi and worked at the Institute of Literature.
- 2014: Leaving the Literature Institute to become an independent researcher. Then entered Nhã Nam Book House as an editor, at once instituted Hán Nômprimary classes.
- 2015: Trần Quang Đức was named #23 in the Vietnamese version of the Forbes 30 Under 30 list as a "Hán-Nôm researcher". The list features individuals renowned in their own industries thanks to their achievements.

== Works ==
=== Poetry ===
- Opine (述懷, 2010)
- Dữ chư văn sĩ hoan ẩm hậu ký (與諸文士歡飲後記, 2010)
- Tao dân phòng đảng xa sách phạm phí (遭民防挡车索犯规费, 2010)
- Ballad for the motorbike-taxi driver (車夫行, 2011)
- Bán dạ dự Vô Công Khuất Lão Nam Long hoan ẩm hậu cảm (半夜與無公屈老南龍歡飲後感, 2011)
- Recalling what you long know (長相憶, 2011)
- Recovering from illness (Khỏi ốm, 2011)
- Remembering Elderly Khuất (憶屈老, 2011)
- Giving Elderly Khuất (與屈老, 2011)
- Empty guqin (空琴, 2012)
- Như Hoằng Hóa hải than hữu cảm (如弘化海灘有感, 2012)
- Evening meeting Tử Hư at Giấy Street (暮會子虛於紙鋪, 2012)
- Tặng Tiếu Chi sơn phòng chủ nhân (贈笑之山房主人, 2012)
- Notitle for the autumn (無語之秋, 2012)
- Dream sea (夢海, 2014)
- Sensitization at the old citadel of Hồ dynasty (Cảm tác trước thành nhà Hồ, 2014)
- Diêu hạ Nguyễn Trách Am đản thần thi nhất thủ (遙賀阮窄庵誕辰詩一首, 2016)
- Travelling Linh Ứng Pagoda (游靈應寺, 2017)
- Điểm hoa trà chiến (點花茶戰, 2020)

=== Literature ===
- Talk about the upadana (破執論, 2010)
- Đại Việt quốc Lý gia Thái Tổ hoàng đế thiên đô kỷ sự bi (大越國李家太祖皇帝遷都紀事碑, 2010)
- Leisured records of Cao Trai (高齋閑錄, 2011)
- With Tử Hư to write Loushiming (同子虛寫《陋室銘》, 2012)
- Collection of Vân Trai (雲齋叢話, 2012)
- Small stories of Vân Nang (雲囊小史, 2013)
- Travelling Kim Sơn Cave (游金山洞記, 2017)

=== Disquisition ===
- Thousand years of caps and robes (千古衣冠, 2013) - Monograph
- Vân Trai vô đề tuyển lục (雲齋無題選錄, 2015) - Essay
- Collection of the dreamy cloud (夢雲集, 2018) - Poetry

=== Translation ===
- Classic of tea (茶經, 2008)
- Calligrapher (老徒兒, 2011)
- Love in a Fallen City (傾城之戀, 2011)
- Record of Cicada and Calliphoridae (荊楚歲時記, 2012)
- Chaos Changan (長安乱, 2012)
- Ballad of Tayson (西山行, 2013)
- Records of the grand historian - Basic annals (史記·本紀, 2014)
