= Chang Guitian =

Chinese xiangsheng comedian (1942–2018)

- 常贵田
- Born: 1942; Beijing, Japanese-occupied China
- Died: 30 November 2018 (aged 76); Beijing, China
- Occupation: Xiangsheng comedian
- Years active: 1958–2018
- Organization: Song and Dance Ensemble of the Political Department of People's Liberation Army Navy
- Political party: Chinese Communist Party
- Parent: Chang Baokun

Chinese name
- Traditional Chinese: 常貴田
- Simplified Chinese: 常贵田
Transcriptions
Standard Mandarin
- Hanyu Pinyin: Cháng Guìtián

Chang Guitian (Chinese: 常贵田; 1942 – 30 November 2018) was a Chinese xiangsheng comedian of Manchu ethnicity. He was a first-level national actor. He attained the rank of major general (shaojiang) on December 22, 2012. His disciples included Li Zhiyou (李志有), Zhu Haitang (朱海堂), Zhang Yong (张勇), and Zhang Lingqi (张令奇).

== Biography ==
Chang was born into a family of xiangsheng performers in 1942. His grandfather Chang Lian'an (Chinese: 常连安; 1899–1966) was a xiangsheng master in the first half of the 20th century. His father Chang Baokun (Chinese: 常宝堃; 1922–1951) was a xiangsheng performer who died in the Korean War. His uncle Chang Baohua (1930–2018) was one of the sixth generation of well-known xiangsheng performers.

In 1954 he began to learn xiangsheng under Zhao Peiru (Chinese: 赵佩茹; 1914–1973). Four years later, he joined the Song and Dance Ensemble of the Political Department of People's Liberation Army Navy. Chang was promoted to the rank of major general (shaojiang) on December 22, 2012.

On November 30, 2018, he died of illness in Beijing, aged 76.
