= Guo Qiru =

Chinese xiangsheng performer (1925-1969)

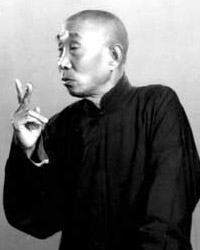
- Born: 12 April 1900; Beijing, Qing China
- Died: 24 April 1969 (aged 69); Beijing, China
- Occupation: Xiangsheng performer
- Years active: 1925–1969

Guo Qiru (simplified Chinese: 郭启儒; traditional Chinese: 郭啟儒; pinyin: Guō Qǐrú; 1900 – 1969) was a Chinese xiangsheng performer.

== Biography ==
On 12 April 1900, Guo was born in Beijing, to a poor family. He belonged to the Manchu ethnic group. He was educated in an old-style private school for about 6 years. In 1923, Guo joined Hongkuishe (鸿奎社). He started to learn the arts of traditional Chinese opera. In 1925, he studied under Liu Dezhi (刘德智) and became a fifth-generation xiangsheng performer. In 1940, he performed xiangsheng with Hou Baolin and became widely known. In 1951, Guo and Hou Baolin gave a gratitude performance at the front of the Korean War. In 1954, Guo and Hou Baolin gave a gratitude performance in Tibet.
