= Chang Baohua =

Chinese xiangsheng comedian (1930–2018)

- Born: December 1930; Tianjin, China
- Died: 7 September 2018 (aged 87); Beijing, China
- Spouse: Fu Tianzhen

Comedy career
- Genre: Xiangsheng

Chinese name
- Traditional Chinese: 常寶華
- Simplified Chinese: 常宝华
- Hanyu Pinyin: Cháng Bǎohuá

Chang Baohua (December 1930 – 7 September 2018) was a Chinese xiangsheng comedian of Manchu ethnicity. He was one of the sixth generation of well-known Chinese xiangsheng actors. He authored one hundred and seventy works. Chang was a member of the Chinese Communist Party and a first-level national actor.

== Early life and family ==
Chang was born to an impoverished family in Tianjin in December 1930. His brother's and father's xiangsheng performances supported the family. Initially, Chang could not attend school but the education of a wealthy neighbour's child engendered in him a desire to learn. When the family's fortunes changed for the better, Chang attended a private elementary school in Tianjin where he was a good student.

Chang married and had five children. His granddaughter Chang Si won a silver medal at the 2012 Summer Olympics in synchronised swimming.

== Training ==
Chang was taught by his father, Chang Lianan, and his brother, Chang Baofang. Chang debuted at nine years of age and later appeared at a xiangsheng convention at the Qi Ming Tea House, in the Xi Dan shopping mall, Beijing.

== Career ==
In 1942, Chang performed in Beautiful Song City (锦绣歌城) and Huatian Bacuo (花田八错). In 1951, when he was twenty-one, Chang acknowledged Ma Sanli as his artistic master. Chang joined the Tianjin Folk Artist Mission and received a "Third-class Labor Model" award from the Tianjin Literature and Art Union.

In 1951, during the Korean War, Chang entertained Chinese soldiers. His brother had been killed in the war. In 1953, Chang enlisted in the working group of China's People's Liberation Army Navy. He received the second military award twice and the third military award once.

In the Cultural Revolution, Chang was attacked and this experience became a source of his artistic material. In 1976, Chang and his nephew, Chang Guitian, collaborated to produce the xiangsheng Hats Factory.

Chang later became a judge and a teacher of xiangsheng at institutions such as Peking University and at the North Folk Art Forms School. He visited Hong Kong, America, and Singapore.

In August 2006, Chang received a Peony award for his contribution to the performing arts in China.

== Death ==
Chang died in Beijing on 7 September 2018.

== Works ==
Chang authored over 170 works in the genres of xiangsheng, short sketches and kuaiban (clappertalk). Fifty of these appeared in newspapers. Yesterday (昨天) was translated into English and published in foreign language newspapers. Hat Factory (帽子工厂) and short sketch Language Doctor (语言医生) were published in the Hong Kong Ta Kung Pao in an article called Selected Xiangsheng of Chang's Family (常氏相声选).
