= Daniel Newham =

British performer working in China

Daniel Newham, (Chinese: 牛汉生; pinyin: Niú Hànshēng, stage name: Chinese: 大牛; pinyin: Dà Niú, lit. "Big Bull") is a British performer working in China. He is famous for hosting the CCTV-4 programs Tongyue Wuzhou and Happy China.

== History ==
Daniel Newham, who is of British and German descent, is originally from Cheltenham, England.

In September 1999 Newham arrived in China in order to study Chinese at Renmin University. After one year he studied film for one year at the Nanjing Art Institute.

In 2004 Newham graduated from Renmin University and became the host of the CCTV program Tongyue Wuzhou. He hosted the program Happy China until 2006.

== Views on China ==
Newham recognizes that China has given him many opportunities and friends, and regards himself as a "Sinophiliac".

== Popularity ==
Newham is regarded in China as being highly talented, and his performances have been acclaimed by audiences both within and outside of China.

Along with Mark Rowswell (stage name: Dashan), Newham is one of the few foreign celebrities in China who speak Standard Chinese fluently.
