= Qingping =

Qingping may refer to:

== People ==
- Chen Qingping (1795–1868), Chinese martial artist
- Guo Qingping, representative of the Tianjin constituency in the 11th National People's Congress
- Li Qingping, chairman of China CITIC Bank
- Li Qingping (swimmer), Chinese finswimming medal winner in the 2001 World Games
- Zeng Qingping, Chinese medal winner in the 2009 Asian Wrestling Championships
- Fang Qingping, disciple of Chinese performer Li Jindou
- Kong Qingping, chairman of China State Construction International Holdings
- Su Qingping, a fictional character in the Chinese TV series The Great Dunhuang
- Zeng Qingping, a teacher whose life forms the basis of the 2014 Chinese film The Class of One

== Places in China ==
- Qingping, Chongqing (清平), a town in Hechuan District, Chongqing
- Qingping, Gansu (庆坪), a town in Weiyuan County, Gansu
- Qingping, Guangdong (青平), a town in Lianjiang, Guangdong
- Qingping, Hubei (清坪), a town in Xianfeng County, Hubei
- Qingping, Hunan (青坪), a town in Yongshun County, Hunan
- Qingping, Leshan (青平), a town in Leshan, Sichuan
- Qingping, Shandong, a town in Gaotang County, Shandong
- Qingping, Wusheng County (清平), a town in Wusheng County, Sichuan
- Qingping Subdistrict (清平街道), a subdistrict in Shunhe Hui District, Kaifeng, Henan
- Qingping Township, Guizhou (庆坪乡), a township in Ceheng County, Guizhou
- Qingping Township, Mianzhu (清平乡), a township in Mianzhu, Sichuan
- Qingping Township, Yunnan (清平乡), a township in Longchuan County, Yunnan
- Qingping Yi Ethnic Township (清平彝族乡), a township in Pingshan County, Sichuan
- Qingping, a township in the city of Mianzhu, Sichuan
- Qingping, a village in Fumin County, Yunnan
- Qingping Expressway, a provincial expressway in Guangdong
- Qingping Village (青坪村), an administrative division of Cha'ensi, Xiangtan, Hunan
- Qingping Village (清平村), a village in Xidu, Hunan
- Qingping Village, a village in Yueshan, Xiangxiang, Hunan

== See also ==
- Gaotang Qingping National Ecopark, a protected area in Shandong
