= Shi Shengjie =

- 师胜杰
- Born: 3 April 1953; Heping District, Tianjin, China
- Died: 28 September 2018 (aged 65); Harbin, Heilongjiang, China
- Spouse: Song Yan (m. 1981; died 2018)
- Children: 1
- Parent(s): Shi Shiyuan; Gao Xiuqin

Comedy career
- Years active: 1975–2017
- Genre: Xiangsheng

Chinese name
- Traditional Chinese: 師勝傑
- Simplified Chinese: 师胜杰
Transcriptions
Standard Mandarin
- Hanyu Pinyin: Shī Shèngjié

Shi Shengjie (3 April 1953 – 28 September 2018) was a Chinese xiangsheng comedian.

== Biography ==
Shi was born in Heping District of Tianjin, China, on 3 April 1953, to Shi Shiyuan (Chinese: 师世元) and Gao Xiuqin (Chinese: 高秀琴), both were well-known xiangsheng performers in Tianjin and Beijing. At the age of 6, Shi moved to Harbin, Heilongjiang to live with his father. He then studied xiangsheng under Zhu Xiangchen (Chinese: 朱相臣).

In late 1965, Shi's father committed suicide because of persecution at the early stage of the Cultural Revolution, and his elder brother was denounced as a "counterrevolutionary". In August 1969, Shi became a sent-down youth and worked at Heilongjiang Production and Construction Corps. In 1975, he began performing xiangsheng with Jiang Kun, a renowned xiangsheng comedian. In 1984, he became the last disciple of Hou Baolin, one of the most popular and influential xiangsheng performers in the PRC era. Shi had appeared in the CCTV New Year's Gala show since 1989.

On 28 September 2018, Shi died of liver cancer in Harbin, Heilongjiang.

== Personal life ==
In June 1981, Shi married Song Yan (Chinese: 宋艳). The couple had a daughter named Shi Yiwen (Chinese: 师艺文).
