= Zhu Shaowen =

Chinese storyteller and xiangsheng performer (1829–1903)

- Born: 1829; Beijing, China
- Died: 1903 (aged 73–74); Beijing
- Occupation: Xiangsheng performer

Chinese name
- Traditional Chinese: 朱紹文
- Simplified Chinese: 朱绍文
Transcriptions
Standard Mandarin
- Hanyu Pinyin: Zhū Shàowén

Zhu Shaowen (Chinese: 朱紹文; 1829–1903), better known by his stage name Fear No Poverty (穷不怕), was a Chinese storyteller and xiangsheng performer, widely regarded as one of the earliest performers of the art. Born in Beijing, China, Zhu was a protégé of late Qing dynasty entertainer Zhang Sanlu, and specialised in puns. Zhu was one of the "Eight Oddities of Tianqiao" (天桥八怪) and served as a mentor to later xiangsheng performers. Although he died in 1903, many of his works are still performed.

== Early life and career ==
Zhu was born in Beijing, China, in 1829. At a tender age he was enrolled in an opera school. Later in life he turned to street performing, and studied under Zhang Sanlu, together with Shen Chunhe and A Yantao (阿彦涛). His immediate juniors were Xu Zhangfu (徐长福), Feng Kunzhi (冯昆治), Fan Zhangli (范长利), Gui Zhen (桂祯), Chen Zhushan (沈竹善), and Chun Zhanlong (春长隆). Prior to performing xiangsheng, Zhu dabbled in storytelling and singing. Under the stage name of Fear No Poverty, he often performed at Tianqiao, where he would entertain the masses with his pun-filled solo monologues. His word plays were well received and his fame gradually grew. Before performing, Zhu was known for practising Chinese calligraphy; he would write two separate words on large pieces of paper and display them in public afterwards.

Zhu became part of the original "Eight Oddities of Tianqiao" (天桥八怪), alongside three other xiangsheng artistes, three martial arts practitioners, and a man who could produce melodies with his nose. Zhu popularised xiangsheng involving two people or more, as opposed to a one-man performance which was the norm then. He wrote many original scripts and those that have survived are still performed to this day. Zhu also used xiangsheng as a vehicle for criticising the corrupt ruling government, as seen in several of his works of his, including "Picture of Attaining Victory" (得胜图) and "Words" (字象).

== Later years and death ==
Zhu Shaowen's disciples included Pin Youben, Fu Guizhen, Xu Changfu, and Fan Changli. He assigned all of the first and second groups of his students stage names starting with you (有; to have) and de (德; virtue) respectively. Zhu died in his hometown in 1903.

== Legacy ==
Historically speaking, Zhu Shaowen's teacher Zhang Sanlu was the "absolute originator" of xiangsheng, whereas Zhu and his peers were considered second-generation performers. However, many credit him with redefining xiangsheng; accordingly, he has been dubbed various titles including "father of xiangsheng" and "(the) original xiangsheng artiste". As the Journal of Tsinghua University writes, "Never mind how many xiangsheng artistes preceded Zhu Shaowen, for he shall be considered the Father of Xiangsheng. Some of those before him may have been more talented, but they did not provide anything for posterity, nor did they have successors. Nobody before him left behind that great a legacy of eternal wisdom and inspiration."

== Notable works ==
- "New Year" (过新年)
- "Thousand Words Text" (千字文)
- "Three Myopia" (三近视)
- "Eighteen Black" (十八黑)
- "Long Dream" (睡梦长)
- "Five-column Eight Trigrams" (五行八卦)
