= Travel in Chinese =

Chinese television series

Travel in Chinese is a 15-minute segment on CCTV-9 that is hosted by Dashan. The segment is a Chinese lesson.

== Background ==
The Chinese lesson segments is broken down into:

- A 2- to 3-minute action scene using key Chinese phrases
- An analysis by Dashan on each of the phrases
- A word substitution exercise to utilize the key phrases described in the action scene
- A recap of the action scene
- A 2- to 3-minute segment providing in-depth information about the travel destination in the action scene

On occasion, the entire program is a review of past lessons with guests consisting of Chinese language students who will converse completely in Mandarin while Dashan responds in English. Typical students are usually not of Chinese origin.

The programme particularly focuses on aspects of the Standard Chinese language. Dashan usually points out many language points such as idioms that don't particularly translate to English and the use of the measure word.

Although anyone can start learning Chinese through this program, the program is geared for many levels from beginner to advanced.

== Communicate in Chinese ==
Travel in Chinese succeeded Communicate in Chinese, the previous title, but also with Dashan as the host.

Some key differences in strategies between Travel in Chinese and Communicate in Chinese are:

- Travel In Chinese focused more on conversational situations whereas Communicate in Chinese focused on sentence structures
- Travel In Chinese had more realistic scenarios than Communicate in Chinese did even though both series had non-Chinese performers speaking in Mandarin. Communicate in Chinese focused on situations that would more likely to occur outside of China, such as ordering beer, going to the bar, and talking about how one is learning Chinese with the teacher. Travel In Chinese focused more on how to order authentic Chinese dishes and on how to talk to police in an emergency (both scenarios are examples of scenarios that are likely to occur when in China).

== Sports Chinese ==
In January 2008, a new series replaced Travel in Chinese on CCTV-9. Still hosted by Dashan but now titled Sports Chinese, this series largely follows a format similar to Travel in Chinese and Communicate in Chinese, with new content focusing on the topic of sports as Beijing prepared to host the 2008 Summer Olympics.

== Easy Chinese ==
The 13-episode series, Easy Chinese, has been aired during the 2008 Beijing Olympic Games, helping foreigners visiting China during Olympic Games. Daily lessons with short Chinese phrases, more simple than Travel in Chinese and Sports Chinese. It's hosted by Aurora Carlson.

== Growing up with Chinese ==
Newly launched on CCTV-News, the 100-episode series Growing up with Chinese started on August 2, 2010. It is aimed at teenagers and hosted by Charlotte MacInnis, a television host known as Ai Hua in China.

== See also ==
- Chinese Studio, another Chinese language lesson program that broadcasts on China Radio International.
- Travel in Chinese in Russian on CCTV-Русский
- Travel in Chinese in Spanish on CCTV-E
