= Shulaibao =

Type of Chinese folk art performance

Shulaibao (Chinese: 数来宝; pinyin: shǔláibǎo), also known as doggerel, jingle or clever tongue, is a Chinese folk art form consisting of spoken word poetry. It is usually performed by one person or a pair of performers.

The actors achieve an artistic effect by rhythmically reciting or improvising a story with a tightly-controlled number of words in each sentence. Shulaibao verse is typically humorous but easily understood. It is said to be deployed by street beggars, among others, as means of earning donations. It may be used to deliver a light-hearted insult about audience members or rivals. In this way it is similar to the spoken word art forms, such as a rap battle.

In 2014, the Chinese State Council declared shulaibo to be part of the country's national "intangible cultural heritage".

== See also ==
- Xiangsheng
