= Hou Yaowen =

Chinese actor and comedian (1948–2007)

- Born: July 17, 1948; Beijing, China
- Died: June 23, 2007 (aged 58); Beijing, China
- Occupation: Xiangsheng actor

Hou Yaowen (Chinese: 侯耀文; pinyin: Hóu Yàowén; July 17, 1948 – June 23, 2007), or Hou Yuewen (Chinese: 侯跃文), was a Chinese xiangsheng actor originally from Beijing. Throughout his life, he was a member of the China Federation of Literary and Art Circles, vice chairman of the Chinese Quyi Artists Association, member of the Chinese Communist Party (CCP) Committee of the China Railway Art Troupe, deputy head (deputy bureau level) and head of the rap troupe, and a national first-class actor.

== Biography ==
Hou Yaowen was born in 1948, the third son of crosstalk master Hou Baolin. He became a xiangsheng actor in 1960 at the age of 12. His first performance was the crosstalk, "Drunk", that his father Hou Baolin once performed. His mother, Wang Yalan, a native of Tianjin, was a Peking Opera performer. After liberation, she organized a Peking Opera troupe in the street, teaching opera as compulsory obligation and training young actors. Hou's profound Peking Opera skills also benefited from his mother's teaching. His two older brothers were Hou Yaozhong and Hou Yaohua.

In 1985, he became one of the "Top Ten Comedians in China". In 1993, he was awarded the "International Art Achievement Certificate" by the American Huamei Art Society. In 1996, he was awarded the title of "Artist with Virtue and Art" by the Ministry of Culture along with many other honors.

In 1994, he was selected as one of the Chinese Top Ten Comedian Stars.

Hou died of a heart attack at his home on June 23, 2007, aged 59.

Guo Degang was Hou's disciple.

== Career Experience ==
In 1960, Hou Yaowen made his debut performance, "Drunk", which was previously performed by his father. Since then, because his father opposed his aspirations, Hou was referred to as "Little Adi" as his stage name for the first four years of his career.

In 1965, Hou graduated from junior high school and was admitted to the China Railway Art Troupe, where he partnered with Shi Fukuan.

In 1970, he went to the 38th Army in Baoding, Hebei Province with the Art Troupe. After working, he rehearsed with soldiers, creating and performing more than a dozen crosstalks, such as "Being Smart and Brave" and "Little Ball Pushing Big Ball".

In October 1976, after the Cultural Revolution, several works such as Money-obsessed Husbands, Being Brave, and Talking About Drama were released one after another. The names of Hou Yaowen and Shi Fukuan began to be known to the audience. On July 28, 1976, six days after the Tangshan earthquake, Hou went to the disaster area with the railway rescue team for rescue and condolences.

On October 30, 1979, he was elected as a delegate and participated in the 4th Congress of China Writers and Artists. His father, Hou Baolin, was also a representative of the conference, leading him to recognize Hou Yaowen's position in the practice. In the same year, he was elected as a member of the All-China Youth Federation. He also participated in the central condolence group and went to the front lines of the Sino-Vietnamese border in a self-defense counterattack. During this period, he wrote the cross talk "The Disillusionment of a Myth".

On February 12, 1983, he participated in the first CCTV Spring Festival party and performed the cross talk "Be Polite".

On June 26, 1984, he participated in the National Crosstalk Appraisal Meeting held in Qingdao. In this appraisal, Shen Yongnian and Hou Yaowen created the crosstalk "Sweet and Sour Live Fish" performed by Hou and Shi Fukuan, and were awarded two first-place prizes for creativity and performance. On December 11, he visited the United States with the China Quyi Rap Group led by Hou Baolin and made the first official performance of Quyi abroad, which was performed in five cities: New York, Washington, Los Angeles, San Francisco and Seattle. On December 29, he flew to Hong Kong and gave eight performances. In the same year, Hou Yaowen won the highest prize in the National Crosstalk Competition - the first "Hou Baolin Academy Award".

In 1985, in order to celebrate the 20th anniversary of the establishment of Tibet Autonomous Region, he climbed the Tanggula Mountain with the central condolence group and performed for the railway surveyors.

On February 16, 1988, CCTV Spring Festival Gala was broadcast with him as the host. On February 5, 1989, he participated in the recording of CCTV Spring Festival Gala and performed the sketch "A Day of Hero Mother" in cooperation with Zhao Lirong.

In 1993, he was awarded the "International Certificate of Artistic Achievement" by the American Huamei Art Society.

In September 2000, he joined the CCP. Following the 9/11 attacks in New York City, he went to the United States with the China Federation of Returned Overseas Chinese Art Troupe to express condolences to overseas Chinese and held charity performances in nine regions including Phoenix, Boston and Dallas.

On November 5, 2002, he went to Tianjin to participate in the "Academic Seminar to Commemorate the 104th Birthday of Zhang Shouchen" and performed the cross talk "Eight Fan Screens". On December 10, he became the vice chairman of Chinese Quyi Artists Association. In the same year, he served as the deputy head of China Railway Art Troupe, the head of art direction and rap troupe. He also served as the judge of CCTV National TV Crosstalk Competition.

On September 11, 2003, the "Global Conference of Overseas Chinese Promoting the Peaceful Reunification of China" was held in Moscow, and Hou Yaowen attended the Mid-Autumn Festival party for the delegates.

On the evening of September 23, 2006, the 4th China Quyi Peony Awards Gala was held in Wutaishan Gymnasium, Nanjing, as the awarding guest.

On February 13, 2007, "2007 China Xiaoxing (Jinan) Crosstalk Joy Club" was staged in Jinan. The China Railway Art Troupe, led by Hou, performed with Degang Guo, Yu Qian, Shi Fukuan, Yang Jinming, Shi Shengjie, Li Jiacun, Qizhi and Chen Hanbai. On the afternoon of June 21, he participated in the recording of the final scene of "the legendary swordsman" in Tianjin. The program scheduled to be broadcast in early July became Mr. Hou's final performance on the TV screen.

== Personal life ==
=== Family ===
Hou Yaowen was the third son of the late crosstalk performer Hou Baolin.

His mother was Wang Yalan, a Tianjin native and Peking Opera actress. After liberation, she organized a Peking Opera Troupe in the street to teach opera and train young actors. Hou Yaowen's knowledge of Peking Opera also benefited from his mother's teachings.

Hou Yaowen's second brother is crosstalk performer Hou Yaohua.

=== Marriage ===
In 1990, Hou Yaowen ended his marriage with Leo Liu, a dancer of the Railway Art Troupe and mother of his eldest daughter Hou Zan.

In 1993, Hou Yaowen married Yuan Yin, a student of Beijing Film Academy, and divorced in 2004. Yuan Yin is the mother of his youngest daughter Hou Yishan.

=== Apprentices ===
Hou Yaowen had twenty-eight disciples including Li Bocheng, Li Boliang, Zhao Guangwu, Jia Lun, Gao Yuqing, Li Bingjie, Dan Lianli, Chen Hanbai, Guo Qiulin, Liu Ji, Li Fusheng, Wang Wei, Ma Xiaoping, Wang Zhaolin, Yang Guang, Qi Zhi, Jiang Guicheng, Wang Yu, Liu Jie, Guo Xiaoxiao, Jing Linye, Guo Degang and Chang Kuan.

Guo Degang joined the art world in 1979. He first studied storytelling with Gao Qinghai, a storytelling elder, and then studied crosstalk with Chang Baofeng, a famous crosstalk artist. In 2004, he also studied Peking Opera, Pingju, Hebei Bangzi and other operas. Beijing Deyunshe was founded in 1996, formally Beijing Deyunshe Culture Communication Company Ltd., is a Chinese Xiangsheng organization and folk-art performance group based in Beijing. Since 2005, Guo Degang and its Deyunshe have sprung up, which made the public pay attention to the art category of crosstalk again and resulted in the second revival of cross talk.

After Hou Yaowen suddenly died, the reporter contacted Guo Degang and Qizhi, Hou Yaowen's disciples, who were deeply saddened by the death of their mentor. When the reporter called on the evening of June 23, Guo Degang was live broadcasting a TV program in Hefei. After hearing the news, Guo Degang and Yu Qian, who were preparing to record, burst into tears. They originally planned to return to Beijing immediately, and even checked off the playing list, but in the end Guo Degang and Yu Qian held back their grief and continued to record.

After the thirteenth anniversary of Hou Yaowen's death, Guo Degang still wrote poems and published articles to mourn his master.

=== Partner ===
Hou Yaowen and Shi Fukuan began their partnership in 1965, which lasted until Hou Yaowen's death.

== Death ==
On the morning of June 23, 2007, Hou reportedly started feeling uncomfortable and started to vomit after eating, but ignored his symptoms due to his otherwise good health overall. Later in the afternoon, Hou reportedly felt seriously unwell and called a neighbor to attend to him; his neighbor ended up dialing 999 but was reportedly too far from Hou's location. Emergency personnel received another call from Hou's family by 6:30 p.m. By the time paramedics arrived on scene, Hou displayed no vital signs, was not breathing, and his pupils were fixed and dilated. Hou was rushed to the Peking University Third Hospital, where he died 40 minutes later aged 58.

Guo Suqing, deputy director of the emergency center, stated the cause of Hou's sudden death was likely a cardiac disease. Although Hou had no history of cardiovascular and cerebrovascular diseases before his death, Guo stated that the summer and its hot weather could have led to sudden contraction of cardiovascular and cerebrovascular diseases. Guo expressed regret for Hou Yaowen's death. Guo also noted that Hou had a routine physical examination scheduled for June 19, four days before his death, but missed it due to "temporary work arrangements".

=== Burial ===
On March 23, 2011, four years after his death, Hou Yaowen was buried. Conflict between family members regarding the division of his possessions led to the delay of his burial.

== Representative works ==
Time	Name of the work	Partner
1983	《讲礼仪》	石富宽
1983	《山东二黄》	石富宽
1983	《歌曲研究》	石富宽
1984	《糖醋活鱼》	石富宽
1986	《戏迷》	石富宽
1987	《打岔》	石富宽
1990	《口吐莲花》	石富宽
1992	《小站联欢会》	石富宽
1993	《侯大明白》	石富宽
1997	《京九演义》	石富宽
2002	《马年赛马》	石富宽、师胜杰、王平、刘流
2004	《十二生肖大拜年》	石富宽、陈寒柏、王敏、李嘉存等
2005	《鸡年说鸡》	石富宽、郑健、李嘉存

Other works:

- 《财迷丈人》
- 《火红的心》
- 《乾隆再世》
- 《一部电视剧的诞生》
- 《侯大明白》
- 《戏曲漫谈》
- 《见义勇为》
- 《京九演义》
- 《侯氏发声法》
- 《你怎么不早说》
- 《小眼看世界》
- 《拿人手短》
- 《心累》
- 《打岔》
- 《英雄母亲的一天》
- 《打扑克》
