= Vocal mimicry =

Vocal mimicry may refer to the following:

- use of the human voice to mimic other sounds, including
  - kouji in Chinese performance
  - vocalized sound effects
  - bird calls such as duck calls
  - vocal percussion such as beatboxing
  - xenoglossia
  - impressionists imitating famous humans
- mimicry of the human voice by birds or other animals
