= Chinese comedy =

Chinese comedy dates back to the Zhou dynasty (1100 BC to 221 BC) when the aristocracy kept jesters in their homes. At that time people in higher society were profoundly influenced by the teachings of Confucius, and as a result comic shows were usually looked down upon in feudal China. During the late Qing dynasty (1644–1911) and Republic of China period, different styles of comedy flourished in big cities and the genre of xiangsheng comic drama began to emerge. Since the 1980s, the rapid development of media throughout the country has led to the formation of new forms of comedy, which have become popular among the general population. Today, the most consumed genres of Chinese comedy are Chinese skit and Xiangsheng.

== Xiangsheng ==
Xiangsheng (simplified Chinese: 相声; traditional Chinese: 相聲; pinyin: xiàngsheng; lit. 'face and voice'), also known as crosstalk, is a traditional Chinese comedic performance in different forms of dialogue. Xiangsheng is a language art combining four basic techniques: speaking, imitating, teasing, and singing. It can be conducted by one or two performers. It is one of the most popular forms of entertainment because its language is rich in puns and allusions. New developments have been applied to this traditional art in order to keep pace with the times. Xiangsheng is a very contemporary performance. Comedians place emphasis on creating new works and injecting new elements into traditional works making them more relevant to current affairs. It is performed in the form of a dialogue between two performers, or, much less often, a solo monologue or, even less frequently, a multi-person dialogue.

== Chinese skit ==
Chinese skit is a form of performance about small things in people's daily lives. Chinese skit is generally regarded as originating in 1980s. It has inherited qualities, and developed from other forms of comedy, such as stage play, xiangsheng, errenzhuan and comic drama. A skit revolves around just one topic, but with a lot of action and lively language. Through promotion by the Spring Festival Gala Evening over 2 years, Chinese skit became a very popular artistic form in China. The first skit in China was "eating noodles" (in 1984) which was performed by Chen Peisi.

== Shanghai style stand-up comedy ==
The typical form of Shanghai-style stand-up comedy is the style known as "Shanghai Qing Kou", which was created by Zhou Libo – a most famous stand-up comedian in China. "Shanghai Qing Kou" originated from different forms of local stand-up comedy in Shanghai, Beijing and Hong Kong. It is a style of comedy in which the performer speaks directly to the audience on socially popular topics. In the performances the performer will include his or her personal experiences.
