= Silicomedy =

Comedy club in the San Francisco, US

Silicomedy (Chinese: 硅谷脱口秀, abbreviated as GGTKX) is a comedy club located in Silicon Valley in the San Francisco Bay Area of California, United States. Silicomedy was founded in 2019., mainly featuring Chinese performers and Mandarin stand-up comedy shows. It is the largest and earliest established Chinese-language comedy club in North America. Silicomedy performers come from various industries in Silicon Valley and are amateur comedy enthusiasts. It has now expanded into a multicultural and diverse comedy club. Silicomedy's performance formats mainly include offline open mics, premium shows, variety shows, and special performances, supplemented by online video platforms and social media.

== Club History ==
In September 2019, the first offline open mic was held in Sunnyvale, California, with Zaolian as the sole performer and about 15 audience members. The founding staff included Daguo, Shuibuxing, and Xiao Jiang.

In February 2020, the last offline performance before the full onset of the COVID-19 pandemic in the United States was held in Fremont, California, with 10 performers and 94 audience members.

From February 2020 to June 2021, performances were conducted through live streaming on their official YouTube channel.

In June 2021, offline performances resumed in an outdoor park in Cupertino, California, with 6 performers and over 40 audience members for the first resumed show.

In September 2021, the official indoor venue in Cupertino was inaugurated.

In March 2022, Silicomedy collaborated with Xiaoguo Culture for their first overseas flight plan.

In September 2023, on the occasion of its 4th anniversary, Silicomedy held the Silicon Valley Comedy Carnival.

== Related Figures ==
Mark Rowswell (Chinese: 大山), collaborated with Silicomedy to host a fan meet-and-greet event called "Dashan's Comedy Friends Gathering".

Jesse Appell (Chinese: 艾杰西), has conducted training sessions and special performances such as "Jesse and Friends" and "A Northeastern American in China" at Silicomedy.

Zaolian, founder of Silicomedy, participated in the online recording of the third season of Rock & Roast in 2020.

Zhaoyang, a Silicomedy performer who first took the stage in 2019, created the special show "You Are a Horse" and participated in the recording of Tencent Video's "Stand-up Comedy and Its Friends"
