= Ding Guangquan =

Chinese comedian (1944–2018)

- Born: 14 October 1944
- Died: 18 January 2018 (aged 73); Beijing, China

Comedy career
- Genre: Xiangsheng

Chinese name
- Traditional Chinese: 丁廣泉
- Simplified Chinese: 丁广泉
- Hanyu Pinyin: Dīng Guǎngquán

Ding Guangquan (14 October 1944 – 18 January 2018) was a Chinese comedian. He mainly performed Xiangsheng (crosstalk), a form of traditional Chinese comedy. He was a senior actor in the China Coal-Mine Art Troupe and had accepted over 40 students in his years teaching.

Many of Ding's foreign students are now stars of comic dialogue on the Chinese or international stage today, such as Mark Rowswell (Dashan), Julien Guadfroy, Jesse Appell (艾杰西), Nick Angiers, and Liam Bates (Li Mu).

Ding's master was the famous Xiangsheng master, Hou Baolin, whom he studied under starting in 1973.
