= Wu Zhaonan =

Chinese xiangsheng comedian

- 吳兆南
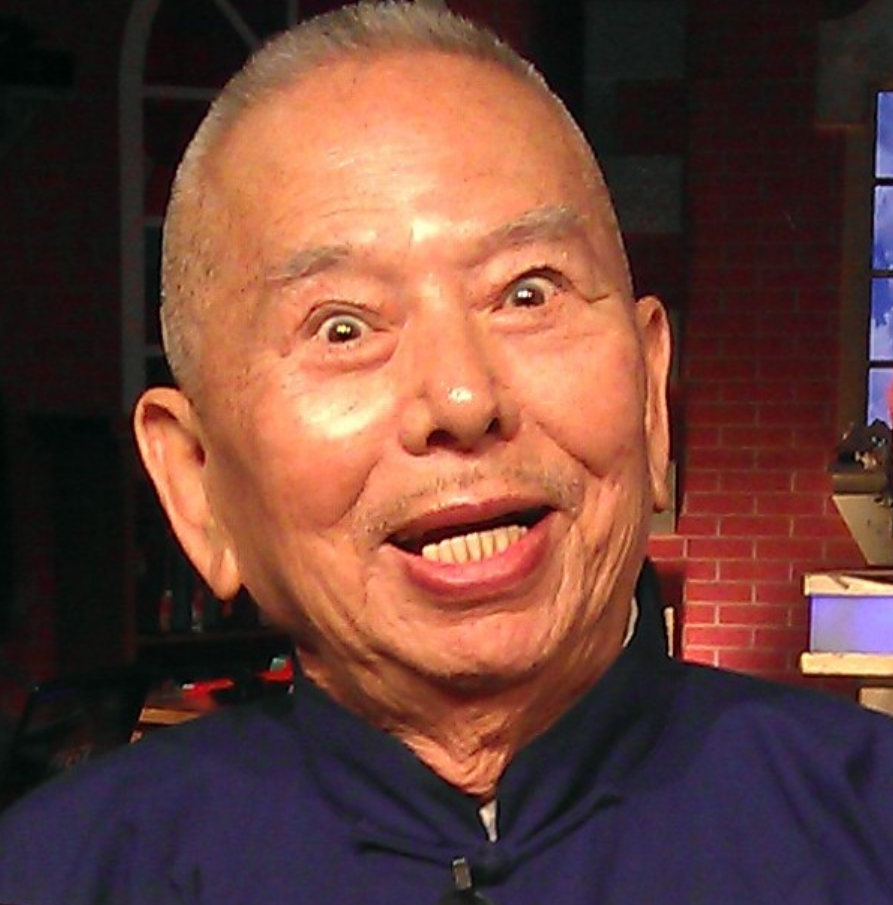
- Wu Zhaonan in 2012.
- Born: 14 January 1926; Peking, Republic of China
- Died: 14 October 2018 (aged 92); Los Angeles, California, U.S.
- Education: University of China
- Occupation: Xiangsheng comedian
- Years active: 1951–2018
- Children: 1
- Awards: Lifetime Achievement Award from the Lincoln Center; Golden Melody Award for Lifetime Contributions

Chinese name
- Traditional Chinese: 吳兆南
- Simplified Chinese: 吴兆南
Transcriptions
Standard Mandarin
- Hanyu Pinyin: Wú Zhàonán
- Wade–Giles: Wu² Chao⁴-nan²

Wu Zhaonan (Chinese: 吳兆南; Wade–Giles: Wu Chao-nan; 14 January 1926 – 14 October 2018) was a Chinese xiangsheng comedian based in Taiwan. He was officially recognized by the government of Taiwan as a "national treasure". He was the recipient of the Lifetime Achievement Award from the Lincoln Center and the Golden Melody Award for Lifetime Contributions. Before becoming a comedian, he ran a food stall in Taipei where he created and popularized the dish Mongolian barbecue.

== Creation of Mongolian barbecue ==
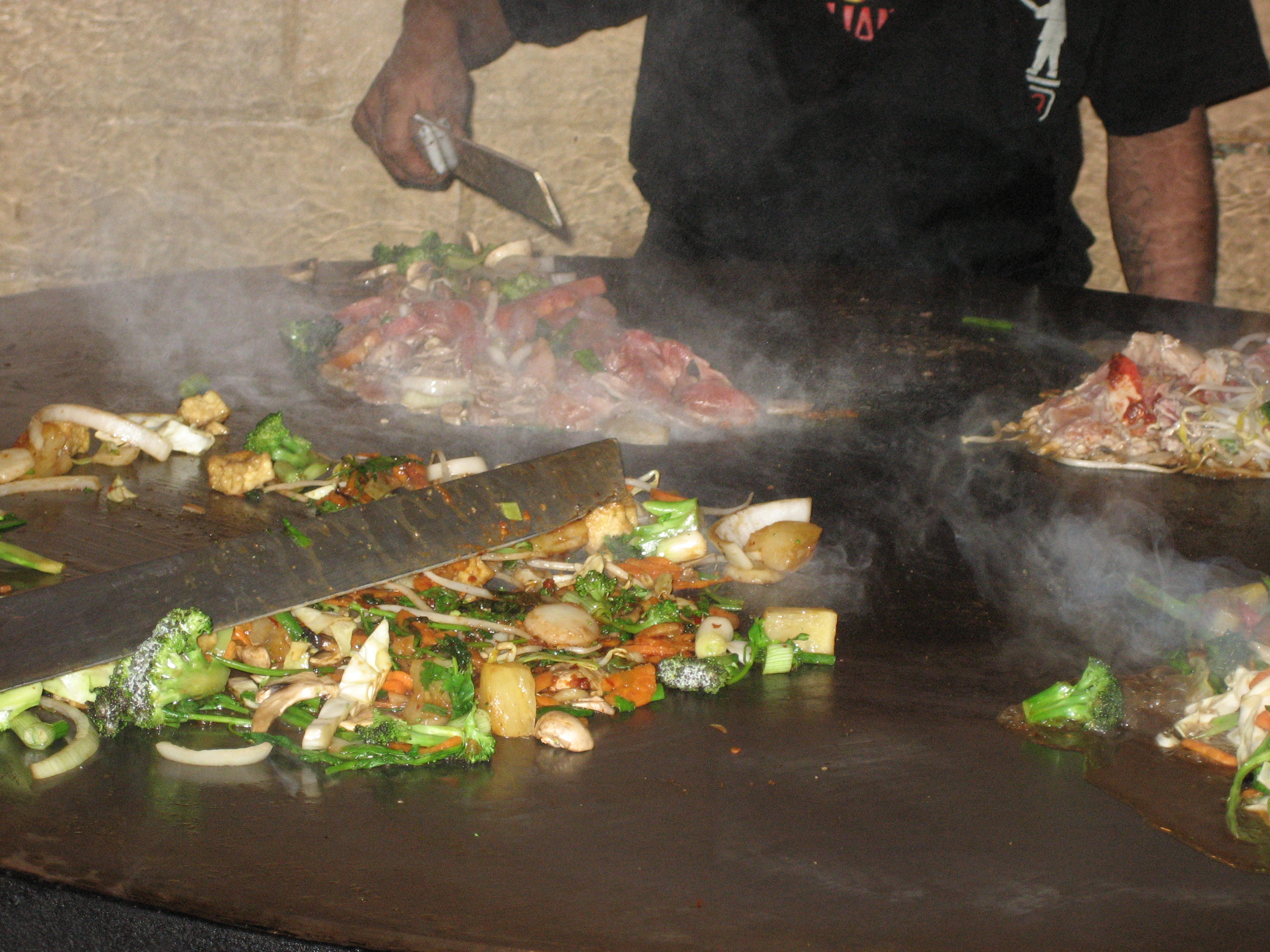
Wu created the popular dish Mongolian barbecue before he became a comedian.

Wu was born in Beijing, Republic of China, on 14 January 1926. He graduated from the University of China with a degree in economics.

He fled to Taiwan when the Communist Party took over mainland China in 1949, and opened a street food stall in Yingqiao, Taipei in 1951, where he created the popular dish Mongolian barbecue. He originally wanted to call the dish "Beijing barbecue", but because of political sensitivity surrounding that city, which had just recently been designated as the capital of Communist China, he settled on the term "Mongolian barbecue" instead, even though the dish had no direct connection with Mongolia.

Wu's food stall became very popular, and even attracted foreign diplomats and wealthy businesspeople as customers despite being a cheap eatery. However, it was later destroyed by flooding during a typhoon, in which Wu nearly drowned. When he exited the restaurant business to develop his xiangsheng career, numerous imitators emerged to capitalize on the popularity of the dish he created, which was later also introduced to the West.

== Xiangsheng career ==
Wu began performing xiangsheng in 1951 and later exited the restaurant business as his popularity grew. Performing on radio and on stage, he became one of the most famous xiangsheng actors in Taiwan. He frequently partnered with Wei Lung-hao, and their radio show became an iconic memory in Taiwan.

Wu moved to the United States in 1973, where he continued to perform xiangsheng as well as Peking opera. He also developed a brand of beef jerky. In 1983, the xiangsheng master Hou Baolin took him as a disciple, inducting him into the formal lineage of the art. Wu trained many students of his own, notably Hou Guanqun, Lang Tzu-yun, Liu Tseng-kai, Liu Erjin, and Fan Kuang-yao. Lang Tzu-yun founded the performing arts troupe Spring Sun, for which Wu has written.

Wu received many awards including the Lifetime Artistic Achievement Award from the Lincoln Center for the Performing Arts in New York City, the Xinchuan Award (薪傳獎) of Taiwan and the Outstanding Artist of Asia Award. In 2009, Wu was given the Golden Melody Award for lifetime contributions, which was followed by an honor bestowed at the first Taipei City Master of Traditional Arts Awards ceremony in 2010. The government of Taiwan formally named him a "living national treasure" in 2011.

== Personal life ==
He was married until his wife's death in 2009. They had one son, Wu Manyu.

On 14 October 2018, Wu Zhaonan died from multiple organ failure in Los Angeles, California, aged 92. A memorial service was held at the Chiang Kai-shek Memorial Hall in Taipei on 2 November, which was attended by many dignitaries including Ma Ying-jeou, Hung Hsiu-chu and Jason Hu, as well as Wu's disciples including Lang Tzu-yun and Liu Erjin.
