= Hou Baolin =

Chinese xiangsheng performer (1917-1993)

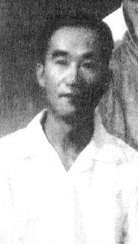
- Born: November 29, 1917; Tianjin, China
- Died: February 4, 1993 (aged 75); Beijing, China
- Occupation: Xiangsheng actor
- Spouse: Wang Yalan
- Children: Yaozhong, Yaoru, Yaohua, Yaowen, Zhen

Chinese name
- Traditional Chinese: 侯寶林
- Simplified Chinese: 侯宝林
Transcriptions
Standard Mandarin
- Hanyu Pinyin: Hóu Bǎolín

Hou Baolin (traditional Chinese: 侯寶林; simplified Chinese: 侯宝林; pinyin: Hóu Bǎolín; November 29, 1917 – February 4, 1993) was a Chinese xiangsheng performer. He was one of his generation's most popular and influential xiangsheng performers and was mentor to many later xiangsheng performers. His apprentices include Ma Ji, Ding Guangquan, Shi Shengjie, and Wu Zhaonan. He was the father of Hou Yaohua and Hou Yaowen.

== Biography ==
Hou Baolin was born in Tianjin, China on November 29, 1917. He joined the Peking Opera Troupe at the age of 12, before switching his profession to being a xiangsheng performer, in which he studied under Zhu Kuoquan. After the founding of new China, the social status of folk performers rose considerably.

Hou joined the Quyi Art Troupe of the Chinese Broadcasting Recitation and Ballad Troupe and made major contributions to China's xiangsheng art.

In the 1950s he performed for Mao Tse-tung and other party officials.

In a 1980 interview with Jan Wong of people magazine Hou Baolin recalled "when Chairman Mao laughed he tried to suppress it. Sometimes his face would turn deep red. But Mao kept his finger on the pulse of society by listening to my xiangsheng."

== Personal ==
Hou's third wife was Wang Yalan. Hou had three sons and two daughters, including Hou Yaohua and Hou Yaowen. Hou died on February 4, 1993, at the age of 76 of stomach cancer. He was buried at Babaoshan Revolutionary Cemetery, in Beijing, China.
