= Mongolian barbecue =

Stir-fried dish

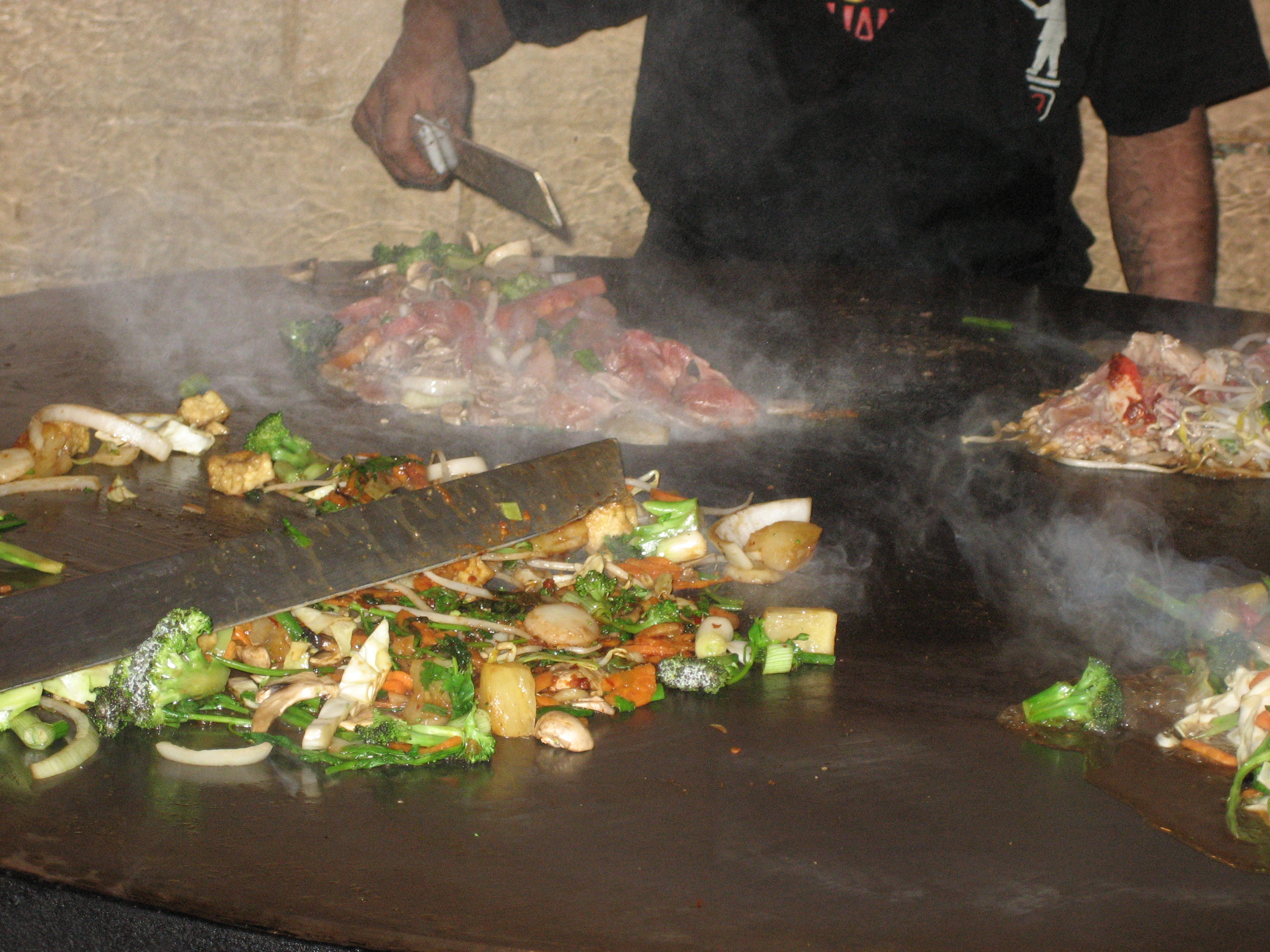
Food cooking on a Mongolian barbecue griddle

An open box with Mongolian barbecue with noodles

Mongolian barbecue (Chinese: 蒙古烤肉; pinyin: Měnggǔ kǎoròu; Wade–Giles: Mêng²-ku³ K'ao³-jou⁴) is a method of preparing stir-fried noodle dishes. Despite its name, the dish is not Mongolian, nor was it influenced by Mongolian cuisine. It was developed in Taiwan by a waishengren during the 1950s. Furthermore, it is also unrelated to actual barbecue traditions (such as American or Korean barbecue), since it is not cooked on a perforated grill above the smoke of an open flame, but rather a specialized flatiron grill. The kind of grill used to cook it is in the shape of a circle, and an upside-down wok was, in 1979, used to cook the dish in Taiwanese establishments. It has more in common with Teppanyaki.

== Origin ==
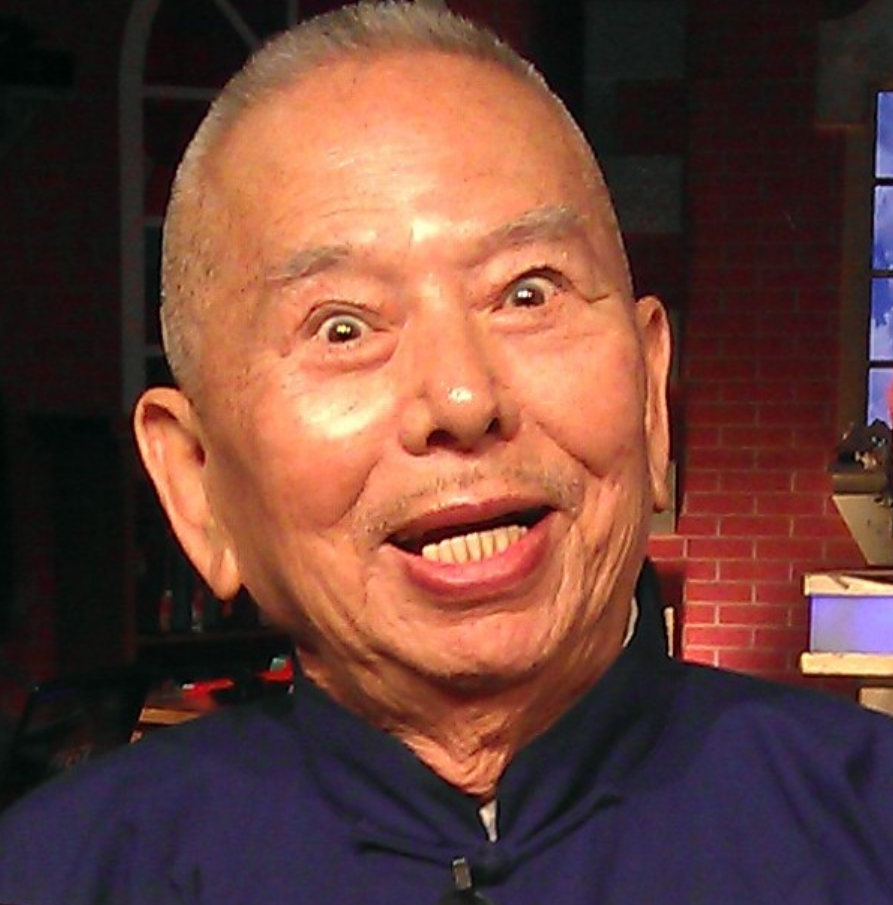
Wu Zhaonan, the creator of Mongolian barbecue, in 2012

Mongolian barbecue was created by Wu Zhaonan, a Taiwanese comedian and restaurateur originally from Beijing, who fled to Taiwan after the outbreak of the Chinese Civil War, and opened a street food stall in Yingqiao, Downtown Taipei in 1951. While he initially wished to name the dish "Peking barbecue" after his hometown, due to political sensitivity associated with the city which had been recently designated as the capital of the People's Republic of China, the name "Mongolian barbecue" was chosen instead.

Wu's food stall attracted a wide clientele including diplomats and wealthy businesspeople despite serving a relatively cheap and unsophisticated dish; however, it was later destroyed by flooding originating from a typhoon during which Wu almost drowned. He was later able to develop a highly successful career as a comedian and left the restaurant business. Numerous imitators emerged to capitalize on the popularity of the dish he created, including Genghis Khan, Tang Palace, Great Khan, and Heavenly Khan. The dish was later successfully introduced outside Taiwan.

== Preparation ==
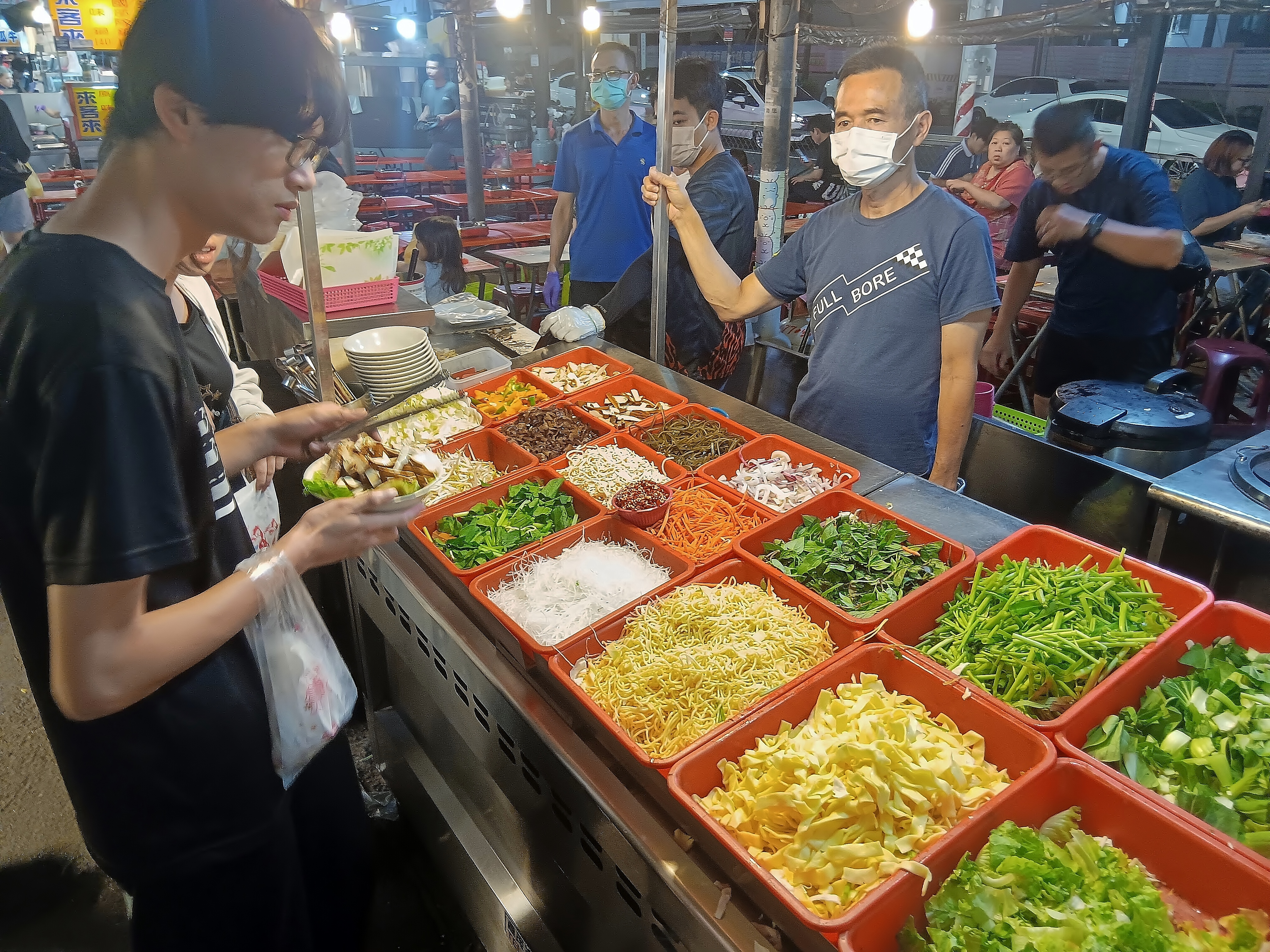
A Mongolian barbecue diner and stall at Ruifeng Night Market, Kaohsiung, Taiwan

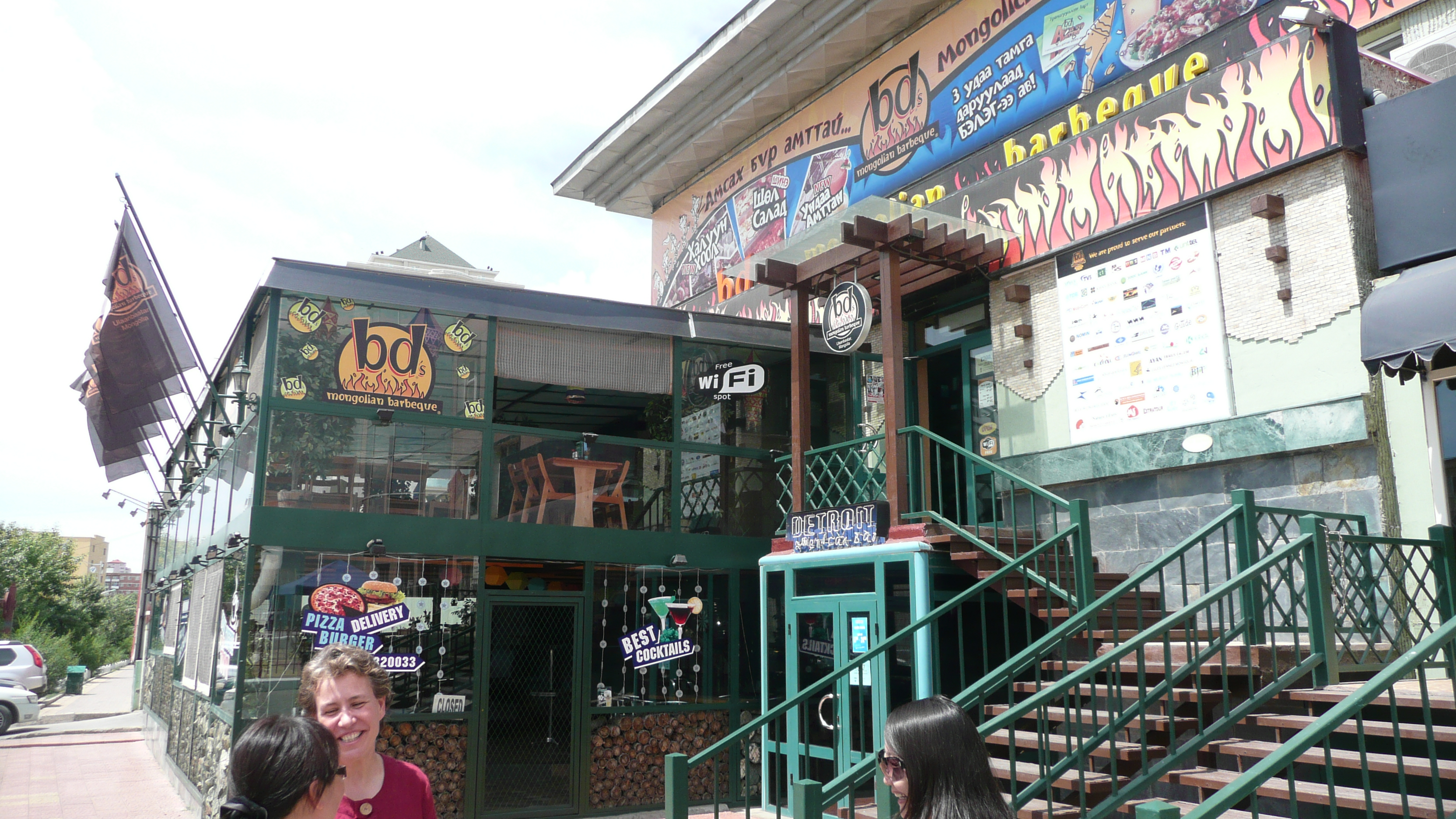
BD's Mongolian Grill in Detroit, Michigan

Typically, diners select a variety of raw ingredients from a display of sliced meat (such as beef, pork, lamb, turkey, chicken, and shrimp) and vegetables (such as cabbage, tofu, onion, broccoli, and mushrooms). The bowl of ingredients is handed to the chef who then adds the diner's choice of sauce and is transferred to a grill.

The circular shape of the grill allows two or more chefs to cook food simultaneously and the food is typically prepared as the grill is revolved around. Oil or water may be added while the ingredients are stir-fried continuously over the high heat with the food items remaining intact.

Some American chains place the food on different parts of the round grill separated by a special wedge shaper. Each dish is stirred in its turn, as the operator walks around the outside of the grill and turns each individual's food in succession.

When cooking is complete, each finished dish is scooped into a bowl and handed to the diner. Many Mongolian barbecue restaurants follow an all-you-can-eat buffet format, allowing multiple visits to the grill.

== See also ==
- Asado
- Bulgogi, a popular Korean stir-fried grill dish
- Jingisukan, a popular Japanese stir-fried grill dish
- Khorkhog, a Mongolian dish referred to as "Mongolian barbecue"
- Korean BBQ refers to a variety of grilled dishes in Korean cuisine
- List of Taiwanese inventions and discoveries
- Saj, a convex griddle used in central, south, and west Asia, eastern and Southern Europe and the Caribbean for cooking bread and meat
- Taiwanese cuisine
- Teppanyaki, a similar Japanese style of cooking
