= Xiangsheng =

Type of Chinese comedy

Crosstalk
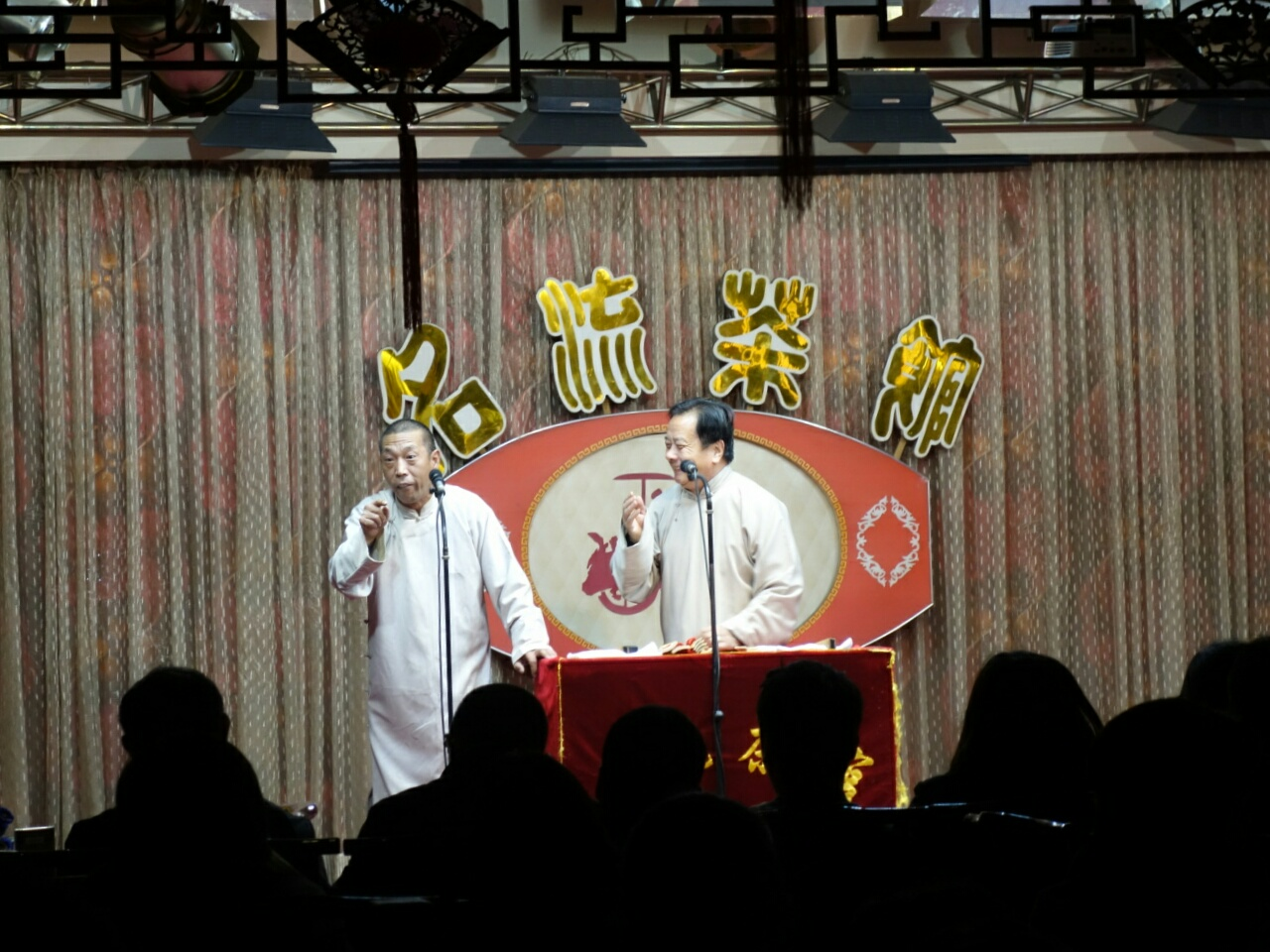
- Xiangsheng performers in a Tianjin theater.
- Medium: Sound
- Types: a traditional performing art in Chinese comedy
- Originating culture: Chinese culture
- Originating era: late Qing Dynasty

Xiangsheng
- Traditional Chinese: 相聲
- Simplified Chinese: 相声
- Literal meaning: face and voice
Transcriptions
Standard Mandarin
- Hanyu Pinyin: Xiàngsheng

Xiangsheng (traditional Chinese: 相聲; simplified Chinese: 相声; pinyin: Xiàngsheng; lit. 'face and voice'), also known as crosstalk or comic dialog, is a traditional performing art in Chinese comedy, and one of the most popular elements in Chinese culture. It is typically performed as a dialog between two performers, or rarely as a monologue by a solo performer (similar to most forms of stand-up comedy), or even less frequently, as a group act by multiple performers. The Xiangsheng language, rich in puns and allusions, is delivered in a rapid, bantering style, typically in the Tianjin dialect (or in Mandarin Chinese with a strong northern accent). The acts would sometimes include singing, Chinese rapping, and musical instruments.

Xiangsheng has connections with the vaudeville Double act that developed in approximately the same era. Some Westerners have studied the art of Xiangsheng. One Canadian student of Xiangsheng, Mark Rowswell, has said that the closest English equivalent is "Who's on First?", a sketch by Abbott and Costello. However, many acts in vaudeville and radio double acts, as well as the screen comedy dialog that evolved from them, are similar to Xiangsheng in their formula.

== Format ==
Modern Xiangsheng comprises four classic skills:

- Speaking (simplified Chinese: 说; traditional Chinese: 說; pinyin: shuō): to tell a story, which is the pragmatic mechanism of humor (i.e. making jokes or using tongue-twisters).
- Imitating (simplified Chinese: 学; traditional Chinese: 學; pinyin: xué): includes Kouji, accents, dialects, and other sounds, as well as imitating the "singing" and actions of specific characters in traditional Chinese operas such as Peking opera, Pingxi, and Bangzi.
- Teasing (Chinese: 逗; pinyin: dòu): to make a joke—tease is the soul of Xiangsheng.
- Singing (Chinese: 唱; pinyin: chàng): only Taiping lyrics can be considered as singing in Xiangsheng.

Xiangsheng is most commonly performed by two actors. The leading actor is called Dougen (simplified Chinese: 逗哏; traditional Chinese: 逗哏; pinyin: dòugén) and the supporting actor is called Penggen (simplified Chinese: 捧哏; traditional Chinese: 捧哏; pinyin: pěnggén).

== History ==
=== Origins ===
Xiangsheng is generally thought to have originated in the late Qing Dynasty, particularly during the rules of the Xianfeng Emperor and the Tongzhi Emperor in the mid-1800s, although its roots may extend as far back as the Ming Dynasty. It began as a form of street performance, incorporating joke-telling, comedic banter, imitations, or borrowing from other performance arts, such as Peking opera, all with the express purpose of making audiences laugh. By the early days of the Republic of China, Xiangsheng had evolved into a more modern format. It was performed in teahouses, theaters, and, eventually, on radio and television.

There are three major sources of Xiangsheng: Beijing Tianqiao, Tianjin Quanyechang, and the Nanjing Confucius Temple. The origins of certain modern-day Xiangsheng pieces can be traced back well over 100 years, though in many cases, the original author is unattributed. Many skits in "traditional Xiangsheng" have evolved through generations of performers successively revising material, retaining the general structure or "heart" of a piece while updating specific references with more modern material.

One of the earliest Xiangsheng pioneers is a person known by the name of Zhang Sanlu (simplified Chinese: 张三禄; traditional Chinese: 張三祿), who performed during the mid-19th century. Originally a performer of Ba Jiao Gu (drum-song) (Chinese: 八角鼓; pinyin: bā jiǎo gǔ), Zhang eventually switched to doing imitations and telling humorous stories. Later artists considered Zhang to have been one of the first Xiangsheng performers.

=== Xiangsheng in mainland China ===
After the establishment of the People's Republic of China in 1949, the popularity of Xiangsheng increased. Previously seen as relatively low-class street performing, Xiangsheng became regarded as a proletarian art form. Because it was performed in Mandarin Chinese, Xiangsheng became a useful tool for promoting the use of Mandarin Chinese throughout China.

In the 1950s, Hou Baolin led a group of Xiangsheng performers to reform Xiangsheng, removing language and content that was considered "vulgar" and generally making it more "politically correct". Hou later became widely regarded as a master of Xiangsheng. He is often regarded as "China's Charlie Chaplin".

As with many forms of performance art, Xiangsheng was banned during the Cultural Revolution. It experienced a huge resurgence in the mid-1970s, with many skits satirizing the Gang of Four and excesses of this period. With the popularization of television in the 1980s, Xiangsheng became a standard feature of the annual New Year's Gala of China Central Television (CCTV), as well as other popular performing arts shows in China.

Xiangsheng entered a period of decline in the 1990s, caused largely by increased official sensitivity towards political and social satire following the 1989 Tiananmen Square protests and massacre, as well as the lack of performance venues outside of sanitized state-run television programming. Many performers called for a return of performing Xiangsheng in teahouses and small theaters, which had traditionally been the main venues for Xiangsheng performances but were almost never used at the time. A new generation of Xiangsheng performers emerged from this movement, including Guo Degang. Guo has been credited with renewing interest among young millennial audiences, who found Xiangsheng to be boring and didactic. Guo's rise to fame, while representing a very traditionalist movement, pitted him against more mainstream, establishment performers, such as Jiang Kun.

In recent years, to appeal to younger audiences, animators have created animated versions of various skits using audio from past broadcasts. The animated versions often use humor in a literal sense, illustrating scenes or stories described by the performers. There are some variety shows for young Xiangsheng actors to promote themselves like "Xiangsheng Has New Talents" (Chinese: 相声有新人) and "Happy Comedian" (Chinese: 欢乐喜剧人), both hosted by Guo Degang.

=== Xiangsheng in Taiwan ===
In 1949, a group of Xiangsheng performers followed the Republic of China's retreat to Taiwan. The same year, Chen Yian (Chinese: 陳逸安), Wei Longhao (Chinese: 魏龍豪), and Wu Zhaonan met and hosted a Xiangsheng show on the Broadcasting Corporation of China and Taiwan Police Radio (Chinese: 警察廣播電台). After 1967, he began collecting data to produce "Xiangsheng Collections", "Xiangsheng Highlight", "Xiangsheng Anecdote", and "Rediscovery of Xiangsheng".

Initially, Xiangsheng's main audience was internal immigrants, mainly from military dependents' villages. In 1985, the performance workshop Biao Fang (Chinese: 表演工作坊) launched That Night, We Speak Xiangsheng (Chinese: 那一夜，我們說相聲), a play performed by Li Liqun (Chinese: 李立群) and Li Guoxiu (Chinese: 李國修), which caused a stir.

In 1989, Biao Fang launched the stage play Tonight, Who Speaks Xiangsheng? (Chinese: 這一夜，誰來說相聲), which was performed by Li Liqun (Chinese: 李立群), Jin Shijie (Chinese: 金士傑), and Chen Lihua (Chinese: 陳立華). Numerous other plays were produced, including:

- Taiwan Bizarre Talk (1991; performed by Li Liqun),
- That Night, We Speak Xiangsheng (Chinese: 那一夜，我們說相聲; 1993; performed by Li Liqun and Feng Yugang (Chinese: 馮翊綱)),
- Another Night, They Speak Xiangsheng (1997; performed by Feng Yugang, Zhao Ziqiang (Chinese: 赵自强), and Bu Xueliang (Chinese: 卜學亮), and
- Millennium Night, We Speak Xiangsheng (2000; performed by Zhao Ziqiang, Jin Shijie, and Ni Minjan).

In 2005, This Night, Women Speak Xiangsheng—performed by Fang Fang (Chinese: 方芳), Deng Chenghui (Chinese: 鄧程慧), and Xiao Ai (Chinese: 蕭艾)—was launched. Although all these plays were claimed to be Xiangsheng, they were actually theater performances.

In April 1988, Feng Yugang and Song Shaoqing (Chinese: 宋少卿) formed Comedians Workshop, which aimed to merge theater with Xiangsheng. Huang Shiwei (Chinese: 黄士伟) joined in 2001. On July 8, 2004, Comedians Workshop assisted Dream Theater to perform Give Me a Tape.

In 1993, Liu Zengqi (Chinese: 劉增鍇) and Lin Wenbin (Chinese: 林文彬) founded the Taipei Musical Art Troupe. In addition to Xiangsheng, they also introduced many Chinese traditional Quyi (a traditional form of Chinese art), such as Shuanghuang (Chinese: 双簧), Pingshu (Chinese: 评书), Shulaibao (Chinese: 数来宝), Kuaiban (Chinese: 快板书), Jingyun drum (Chinese: 京韵大鼓), Meihua drum (Chinese: 梅花大鼓), Xihe drum (Chinese: 西河大鼓), Danxian (Chinese: 单弦), and Taiping lyrics (Chinese: 太平歌詞), which have also promoted the exchange of performances between Taiwan and Mainland China.

On August 26, 1999, Wu Zhaonan announced the establishment of Wu Zhaonan's Xiangsheng Club. Only direct disciples of Wu Zhaonan could become official members. In addition to Xiangsheng, it also introduced Quyi, including Shuanghuang (Chinese: 双簧), Pingshu (Chinese: 评书), Shulaibao (Chinese: 数来宝), Kuaiban (Chinese: 快板书), Danxian (Chinese: 单弦), Taiping lyrics (Chinese: 太平歌詞), and Peking opera.

=== Xiangsheng in Hong Kong ===
Northern Xiangsheng has been popular in Hong Kong since the Zhongyuan period. As early as the Qing Dynasty, storytellers from China brought Xiangsheng to South Guangdong and Hong Kong.

After Hong Kong was ceded as a British colony, the development of Xiangsheng entered a unique period of localization. In the early years of the Republic of China, Hong Kong's Xiangsheng mainly performed in the street, and most Xiangsheng artists were jugglers, such as Pingshu and Kouji. Xiangsheng performers came from all walks of life. They were knowledgeable and enjoyed chatting, thus using Xiangsheng to make a living.

In the 1940s and 50s, Hong Kong cinema began to develop rapidly, and Xiangsheng began to integrate into emerging media. In old Hong Kong movies, Xiangsheng-inspired comedy began to integrate into early Hong Kong cinema, mostly in the form of monologs and characters teasing each other.

In 1957, the first Chinese-language TV media in the world was created; it was called Rediffusion Television Limited and was the predecessor of Asia Television. Xiangsheng became a fixed performance for variety shows. In 1967, Television Broadcasts Limited (TVB) was created, and the variety show Enjoy Yourself Tonight was launched. Xiangsheng began to appear in several variants in the variety show, such as the host's speech and the show to show lines.

=== Xiangsheng in Malaysia (Overseas Chinese) ===
After the Chinese Civil War, a number of performers from South China traveled to Malaysia for development (before Singapore's expulsion from Malaysia). Feng Xiang (Chinese: 冯翔), Bai Yan, and Lu Ding performed Xiangsheng in this region. In the multi-language environment of Malaysia, "Malaysian Xiangsheng" became different from Xiangsheng in mainland China and Taiwan. Since Mandarin Chinese is not a mainstream language in Malaysia, there are few professional performers in Malaysia.

=== Xiangsheng in North America ===
In 1984, 19-year-old Canadian comedian Mark Rowswell started learning Chinese at the University of Toronto. After graduating in 1988, he went on to study Xiangsheng at Peking University with a Chinese comedian and Xiangsheng master, Jiang Kun (姜昆). He started using the Chinese name 'Dashan' (大山), now a household name in China. Dashan has consistently improved his Chinese over thirty years, frequently appearing on national Chinese television. His career has consisted of a wide variety work, not just Xiangsheng, and in recent years he has gravitated more towards Western-style stand-up comedy in Chinese, with elements of Xiangsheng incorporated into the act. Dashan has served informally as a cultural ambassador, using his work to help bridge cultural gaps between Canada and China.

In 2012, American comedian Jesse Appell, known as Ai Jiexi (艾杰西) in China, started on his journey with Xiangsheng. Originally from Boston, Massachusetts, Appell went to Brandeis University where he joined the Global China Connection (GCC) and regularly performed stand-up comedy. He went to China in September 2012 to study Chinese at Tsinghua University as a Fulbright Scholar. There, he improved his Chinese and was awarded the Critical Language Enhancement Award (CLEA). As part of his Fulbright Scholarship, he studied Xiangsheng with a master of the craft, Ding Guangquan (丁广泉). Appell founded a comedy center, LaughBeijing, that hosted over 300 shows per year in Beijing from 2016 to 2020. Some of his work today also focuses on bringing the Western-style stand-up comedy to China. He sees himself as a cultural ambassador, combining his talents with the power of the Internet to help U.S.-China relations and bridge cultural gaps.

=== As social commentary ===
The small scale and popularity of Xiangsheng make it second only to word of mouth in reflecting popular concerns. Hou Baolin and others have said that Xiangsheng items are "works of comic nature which use satire and humor as their principal base. The cross talks use witty speech, bitter, ridiculous ridicule, in order to achieve the purpose of arrogant "big laugh" and entertaining people. Its earliest form was derived from the juggling of "Yuyou". In these jokes, artists often pinned their mockery and whipping against the rulers. Their satirical content strikes home at contemporary malpractices and also often includes political satire." The role of Xiangsheng in the social commentary was seen after the fall of the Gang of Four in 1976 when Xiangsheng performances provided the first open criticisms of the gang. After 1976, Xiangsheng has also satirized corrupt officials and members of the Chinese Communist Party, although criticism of the party as an entity remains off-limits.

== Xiangsheng classifications ==
=== By number of actors ===
- Dankou Xiangsheng: a monolog by a solo performer
- Duikou Xiangsheng: a dialog between two performers
- Qunkou Xiangsheng: a group act with at least three performers

=== By content ===
- Ironic Xiangsheng: performers criticize themselves, others, or concepts, such as Hou Baolin's Walking in the dark (Chinese:夜行记) (criticizes people who do not follow the traffic rules), Jiang Kun and Li Wenhua's Photograph (criticizes the social phenomenon during the Cultural Revolution).
- Complimentary Xiangsheng: performers praise themselves, others, or concepts, such as Ma Ji's The New Peach Garden (praises socialism), Hou Yuewen's Story of Beijing–Kowloon railway (praises the constructor of Beijing–Kowloon railway)
- Entertaining Xiangsheng: performers aim to entertain, such as Speaking in tongues

=== By chronology ===
- Tradition Xiangsheng: in the Late Qing Dynasty
- New Xiangsheng: after 1949
- Contemporary Xiangsheng: after 1980

=== By genre ===
- Ma Sect Xiangsheng: the representative personage Ma Sanli, Ma Zhiming (Chinese: 马志明)
- Chang Sect Xiangsheng: the representative personage Chang Lianan, Chang Baokun (Chinese: 常宝堃)
- Hou Sect Xiangsheng: the representative personage Hou Baolin
- Liu Sect Xiangsheng: the representative personage Liu Baorui (Chinese: 刘宝瑞)

== Notable performers ==
- Zhang Sanlu (simplified Chinese: 张三禄; traditional Chinese: 張三祿) is considered to have been one of the fathers of Xiangsheng. Zhang was born in Beijing in the late Qing Dynasty. His disciples include Zhu Shaowen, A Yantao, and Shen Chunhe.
- A Yantao (simplified Chinese: 阿彦涛; traditional Chinese: 阿彥濤) better known by his stage name A Er (阿二) or A Cier (阿刺二), was a Xiangsheng performer of Manchu descent. His disciples include En Xu, Gao Wenkui, Chun Changlong, and Shen Zhushan. A Yaotao was born in Beijing to a rich family of the Sumuru clan belonging to the Eight Banners. During his childhood years, he developed an interest in traditional Chinese opera and experimented with several different vocal techniques. Later, his family came down in the world. In order to support his family, he studied under Zhang Sanlu and became a second-generation Xiangsheng performer.
- Shen Chunhe, better known by his stage name Shen Er (沈二), told stories before performing Xiangsheng. He studied under Zhang Sanlu and became a second-generation Xiangsheng performer. His disciples include Wei Kunzhi, Wang Youdao, Li Changchun, Gao Wenyuan, Feng Kunzhi, and Yu Erfu.
- Zhu Shaowen (1829–1903), known by his stage name Qiongbupa (穷不怕), was one of the fathers of Xiangsheng. He was born in Beijing, and his ancestral home was Shaoxing, Zhejiang. Zhu was honored as one of the "Eight Oddities of Tianqiao" (天桥八怪). His disciples include Pinyouben, Fu Guizhen, Xu Changfu, and Fan Changli.
- Hou Baolin
- Ma Sanli
- Liu Baorui (Chinese: 刘宝瑞; pinyin: Liú Bǎoruì)
- Ma Ji
- Chang Baohua
- Ding Guangquan
- Jiang Kun
- Hou Yaowen
- Guo Qiru
- Dashan (Mark Rowswell)
- Feng Gong
- Guo Degang
- Yu Qian (Chinese: 于谦; pinyin: Yú Qiān)
- Yue Yunpeng
- Sun Yue (Chinese: 孙越; pinyin: Sūn Yuè)
- Feng Yi-kang (simplified Chinese: 冯翊纲; traditional Chinese: 馮翊綱)
- Sung Shao-ching (Chinese: 宋少卿)
- Lee Li-chun (Chinese: 李立群)
- Li Mu (Liam Bates) (Chinese: 李牧; pinyin: Lǐ Mù)
- Li Jindou
- Volker Stanislaw Learn Chinese with Xiangsheng
- Jesse Appell

== See also ==
- Manzai
- Rakugo
- Shuochang
- Kouji
- Shulaibao
- Double act
- Pingshu
