= Li Jindou =

- 李金斗
- Born: October 15, 1947 (age 77); Beijing, China
- Occupation: Xiangsheng performer
- Years active: 1979-present
- Parent: Li Huilan (李惠兰)

Li Jindou (simplified Chinese: 李金斗; traditional Chinese: 李金鬥; pinyin: Lǐ Jīndoǔ) is a Chinese comedian, sketch actor, xiangsheng performer, and professor of Chinese at Peking University. His disciples include Liu Ying, Ren Jun, Mao Wei, Han Bing, Liu Chang, Fu Qiang, Fang Qingping, Wang Zheng, Xu Qiang, Xu Mingzhe, Zhou Weixing, Xu Ming, Xue Xiaodong, Zhang Wei, Wang Qun, Shi Bufan, Yu Xuejun and Ma Qingjun.

== Biography ==
Li was born on 15 October 1947, in Beijing. He started to learn the arts of xiangsheng from master Zhao Zhenduo (赵振铎). At the age of 13, he became an eighth-generation xiangsheng performer. Li performed xiangsheng in many areas, such as America, Canada, Singapore, Hongkong and Taiwan.
