= Ma Sanli =

Chinese comedian

- Born: 1 October 1914; Beijing, China
- Died: 11 February 2003 (aged 88); Tianjin, China
- Occupation: Xiangsheng actor

Chinese name
- Traditional Chinese: 馬三立
- Simplified Chinese: 马三立
Transcriptions
Standard Mandarin
- Hanyu Pinyin: Mǎ Sānlì

Ma Sanli (Xiao'erjing: ﻣَﺎ صً لِ, simplified Chinese: 马三立; traditional Chinese: 馬三立; pinyin: Mǎ Sānlì; 1914 – 11 February 2003) was a Chinese comedian in the traditional Xiangsheng or "crosstalk" style.

== Biography ==
Ma was born in Beijing; he was of the Hui ethnic group, and the son and grandson of practitioners of Xiangsheng. He was apprenticed to Zhou Deshan in 1929. Ma was a Chinese Muslim.

He came to be noted for avoiding complication in a way that kept his performances accessible to a mass audience. He pursued his art in Tianjin.

He became a widower in 1984. In December 2001, Ma retired from the Xiangsheng profession.

On 11 February 2003, he died in Tianjin after a long battle with cancer.

== Works ==
- Nonsense
- Drunken old man
- Chasing
- Car horn
- Health check
- The charm of the comic
- Recipe
- Eat dumplings
- Sloppy
- Eighty-one floor
- Write Pair
- Meeting the fans
- Physiognomy
- Emotional and health
- Xijiangyue
- Boast Residential
- Remedies
- Pairs
- Three Character Classic
- Pull foreign films
- Buying Monkeys
- Meeting Fiend
- Yellow Crane Tower
