= Global China Connection =

- Founded: 2008; 18 years ago
- Type: Non-profit organization
- Location: Washington D.C.
- Region served: Worldwide
- Key people: Tim Zhang (President); Yihao Li (李一豪) (Chairman of Board of Trustees)
- Website: www.gccglobal.org

Global China Connection or GCC (Mandarin Chinese: 全球中国联接) is a student-run 501(c)3 nonprofit organization that aims to spread China's global influence by connecting students to China. GCC is present in more than 60 universities in North America, Asia, Europe, and Oceania. Global China Connection was founded in 2008 at Columbia University with a motto "Building relationships that will change the world".

== Events ==
GCC events connect companies, social organizations, and aspiring individuals through annual conferences as well as smaller-scale forums. The organization hosts two major conferences each year, generally in New York City (spring) and Beijing (summer). Conferences contain discussion on subjects such as politics, economics, international relations, business, journalism, and culture related to China. Smaller conferences and events are also hosted by chapters within GCC.

Previous speakers at GCC conferences include Liu Xiao Ling Tong.

== Delegations ==
GCC hosts and leads numerous student delegations in both the United States and China.
