= Chinese Bridge =

Chinese language contest

- Simplified Chinese: 汉语桥
- Traditional Chinese: 漢語橋
Transcriptions
Standard Mandarin
- Hanyu Pinyin: Hànyǔ Qiáo

Chinese Bridge logo

Chinese Bridge (Chinese: 汉语桥) is a contest for foreign students on their mastery of the Chinese language, promoted by the Chinese National Hanban and established as a plan to introduce Chinese to the world. Since it began in 2002, more than 600 contestants from over 147 countries throughout the world have participated in the annually-held Chinese language competitions.

There are three versions: one for university students outside of China, one for secondary school students outside of China, and one for non-Chinese students attending educational institutions in China. The first was established in 2002 and the second was established in 2008.

== History ==
Chinese Bridge	Starting time	Address	Topics	1st place winner
The First Contest	August 10, 2002 – August 18, 2002	Shandong Province	The Premiere	
The Second Contest	December 10, 2003 – December 22, 2003	Beijing	China in the 21st Century	
The Third Contest	August 7, 2004 – August 11, 2004	Beijing	China, a Country with a Splendid Culture	
The Fourth Contest	July 13, 2005 – July 15, 2005	Beijing	Experiencing the Beautiful China	Anna Kuzina
The Fifth Contest	July 18, 2006 – July 22, 2006	Beijing	An Ethnically Diverse China	
The Sixth Contest	August 3, 2007 – August 6, 2007	Jilin Province	China Welcomes the Olympics	
The Seventh Contest	July 8, 2008 – August 1, 2008	Hunan Province	Fervor with the Olympics, Fun with Chinese	Lillian Okoye
The Eighth Contest	July 16, 2009 – August 6, 2009	Hunan Province	Fun with Chinese, Hope of Success	Sophie Matthé
The Ninth Contest	July 15, 2010 – August 8, 2010	Hunan Province	Charming Chinese, Splendid EXPO	Stewart Johnson
The Tenth Contest	July 16, 2011 – August 8, 2011	Hunan Province	Bridge of Friendship, Resonance of Passion	
The Eleventh Contest	July 6, 2012 – July 26, 2012	Hunan Province	My Chinese Dream	Isaia Ratsizakaina
The Thirteenth Contest	July 6, 2014 – August 3, 2014	Hunan Province	My Chinese Dream	Monica Cunha
The Fourteenth Contest	July 6, 2015 – August 6, 2015	Hunan Province	Varied	
The Fifteenth Contest	July 6, 2016 – August 8, 2016	Hunan Province	Varied	
The Sixteenth Contest	July 6, 2017 – August 3, 2017	Hunan Province	Varied	Mohamed Elmoiz Mohamed
The 22nd Contest	August 15, 2023 - September 5, 2023	Guangxi Province	天下一家	
The 23rd Contest	August 15, 2024 - September 2, 2024	Fujian Province	天下一家	Benjamin Herman
The 24th Contest 18th (Secondary)	August 6, 2025 - August 24, 2025	Fujian Province	One World One Family (University) Fly High with Chinese (Secondary)	Eva-Anne Kirst

== Notable people ==
=== Participants ===
==== In business and media ====
- Daniela Anahí Bessia (安达): Celebrity, Singer, Actress and Chinese National Television host. (The Eighth Contest)
