= Kouji =

Kouji (Chinese: 口技), which can be translated literally as "mouth skill" or "skill of mouth" is a Chinese vocal mimicry performance art which utilizes the human speech organs to mimic the sounds of everyday life. When this vocal mimicry is combined with varying degrees of story telling, acting, and singing, it results in the basic structure for a Kouji performance. The sounds most commonly used in Kouji tend to be those of animals, such as birds or dogs, but with the advancement of technology, Kouji has also come to incorporate imitations of busses, planes, and modern weapons. It is also now common to use a microphone in the performance of Kouji. Often the Kouji of a highly skilled performer so accurately mimics real life sounds that if the audience were to close their eyes, they might not be able to tell that the sounds were being produced by a human. Although it is an art form in and of itself, it may often be performed in combination with other traditional Chinese art forms such as Cross-talk.

== Elements of Kouji performance ==
Mimicry – The principle and most difficult element of a Kouji performance is of course the vocal mimicry. It has neither a theoretical basis nor a concrete standard framework, and instead relies on the performer’s own talent and hard work in attempting to imitate the sounds of their environment.

Dialogue – It is often necessary to use an appropriate amount of dialogue to accompany vocal mimicry in a Kouji performance. The main aim of using dialogue is to strengthen the connection between the performer and the audience. Dialogue is used as an introduction and a guide throughout the performance. It may be carried out in the form of narration, poetry recitation, or Shuo-chang (Talk-sing) monologues which may be used to introduce a performance.

Humor – Use of comedy serves to enrich a Kouji performance by providing an entertaining context in which to use vocal mimicry. Through humor the audience is invited to follow their innate instinct and laugh at the comical noises coming from the mouth of the performer. Humor fills out and gives character to a performance.

Singing – Often singing is also used in Kouji in order to reference well known songs. In addition, some Kouji performers may also choose to imitate the singing voice of a particular recording artist to display the extent of their vocal mimicry skills.

== History ==
Although Kouji is believed by many to have origins in the animal calls used by hunters in tribal society, there are unfortunately no historical accounts of its transition from such a context into a performance art. The first historical account of Kouji ever recorded was over 2,300 years ago in Shandong province during the Warring States period. In the year 298 BC there was a Qin prime minister named Mengchang who was a student of Confucius, and accumulated over 3,000 followers. Mengchang found himself in a difficult situation when the Qin ruler began to believe that Mengchang could be spying on him for the neighboring state in which he was raised, and Mengchang was jailed. Mengchang tried to win his freedom by sending away for some very special garments to give the Qin ruler’s wife in an attempt to win her over, and thus gain his freedom. Complications arose however when the garments were seized by the guards and locked away. It was at this point that Mengchang used his followers' Kouji skills to steal back the clothes by luring the guards away by mimicking the barking of dogs. When the clothes were retrieved, they were successfully passed on to the ruler’s wife who was deeply touched and sent immediately for the release of Mengchang. By the time that the Qin ruler discovered what had happened, Mengchang and his followers had already begun to flee. When they had reached a nearby mountain pass which was their gateway to freedom, the Qin guards were hot on their trail. They needed to get through the mountains immediately, but it was still night time and the gatekeepers were not permitted to open the pass until the roosters' crows signaled that the morning had come. Yet again, one of Mengchang’s followers used his Kouji skills to mimic a rooster and trigger all of the local roosters to crow. This signaled that morning had come and allowed the gatekeepers to open the pass for Mengchang’s successful escape.

Although this historical record of Kouji from the Warring States period was the first ever to be documented, more documentation followed as time passed. In fact, another student of Confucius named Gongchang Zhi who actually married one of the great thinker’s daughters, was himself known to be a performer of Kouji noted for his bird call mimicry during the same period.

It was during the Tang and Song dynasties that Kouji's development as an art form began to experience slightly more attention from the Chinese state. During these dynasties Kouji was one of the most popular forms of entertainment amongst the common people. As is Chinese political tradition to offer support and resources as a method of incorporation into the state, the government realized the power and importance of Kouji for the Chinese people and began to aid the development of the art form. In order to promote Kouji and train those who practiced it, a society of vocal mimicry was set up by the government.

During this period of Kouji's history in the Song dynasty, truly legendary Kouji masters began to gain fame which has survived up until today. During the rule of Emperor Huizong there was a Kouji master who was nicknamed Liu Baiqin (Baiqin meaning hundreds of species of birds) because he was phenomenal at mimicking bird songs. His level of mastery was so high that his abilities were not limited only to performance; Liu was also able to communicate with birds in trees. The most famous female Kouji Master of all time Wen Banian, also made a name for herself during this same time period by performing her renowned mimicry of fruit peddlers’ cries. With government support and popular demand combined, Kouji found itself in a favorable position as far as nurturing new talents.

The following years were marked by the arrival of celebrated masters of Kouji who advanced the art form by building off of the work of their predecessors. During the Ming dynasty, the most famous Kouji Master was Fang Zhailang who is best known for his ability to imitate the dialects of different regions. Gou Maoer, who lived and performed during the early period of the Qing dynasty, made his name by creating and performing such pieces as "slaughtering pigs" and "pigs fighting for food". These are amongst the performances that have been passed down through the generations and can still be seen today. Later on in the Qing dynasty during the reign of the Guangxu Emperor there was a very eminent Kouji master who was famous for his mimicry of a song bird called the hwamei (melodious laughingthrush), and therefore was nicknamed Hwamei Yang. Amongst his great performances was “two birds fighting over food”, which is now on the verge of extinction.

It can be said that Kouji entered into a new phase of its history beginning in the 1930s when a Shanghai Kouji Master by the name of Yin Shilin implemented radical alterations in the way that Kouji was performed. Traditionally the Kouji master would sit at a big square table surrounded with a screen called an "Eight Immortals" table, which had a fan and a piece of wood on it. With the assistance of these tools, the performer would execute various vocal mimicry acts to entertain the audience who could only hear but not see their performance. The tools were important because they could make up for certain sounds that human speech organs are incapable of producing. Also, the screen allowed the performer to not think about facial expressions and gestures, and concentrate strictly on the sounds that they were making. After the 1930s when the screen and tools were taken away from the stage however, the audience could not only hear the vocal mimicry, but see the artists’ facial expressions and gestures as well. It was at this point in history that Kouji went from being called "drama behind a screen" to Kouji, meaning "vocal skill" or "skill of mouth" . Thus through a combination of imitation of sounds and stage performance, Kouji came to be what some might call a more engaging entertainment experience for the audience.

After the formation of the People’s Republic of China in 1949, Kouji began to reach new audiences around the globe. Kouji masters such as the above-mentioned Yin Shilin and his disciple Zhou Zhicheng (the creators of such performances as "the powerful army of one million crossing the Yangtze River" and "Coastal Front"), traveled abroad extensively to perform Kouji. Largely by touring with acrobat troupes, performers began to gain Kouji an international reputation as "an amazing oriental art". Kouji Master Sun Tai, while in Poland even won a gold medal at the Warsaw International Acrobatics Competition for his performances. Since the Internationalization of Kouji, its relationship with the global community has expanded beyond entertainment for common people into use for Chinese diplomacy. Kouji master Niu Yuliang who currently resides in Beijing, has traveled to over 30 countries and performed for the likes of the King of Cambodia and the former US President George Bush Sr.

== Current status ==
Kouji has been in constant development throughout the generations and ups and downs of history ever since the Tang dynasty. Today, Kouji finds itself facing a new set of generational challenges which threaten to change it forever. A lack of dedicated young disciples not only threatens to minimize Kouji’s presence in the fabric of Chinese culture, but it is also the cause for concern that many traditional performances might be lost forever. An increasing interest amongst the younger generation of China in new and foreign art forms suggests that to a great extent, traditional performance arts such as Kouji might lose some of their attractiveness to the future generations of Chinese. As an art form with a history of over 2,300 years that has traveled the world showcasing the artistic creativity and intelligence of the Chinese people, it has surprisingly still not received any direct support for preservation from the government. As the Chinese government becomes increasingly enthusiastic about preservation of their vast intangible cultural heritage, many hope that Kouji will come under the grace of their assistance as well.

== Mastery ==
To become a master of Chinese Kouji requires much more than may meet the eye. First and foremost a Kouji master must achieve an advanced level of excellence in vocal mimicry. This level of excellence, however, means little without the possession of natural stage presence and a passion for performance. In addition to being able to perform high level vocal mimicry skills with a contagious stage presence, a master of Kouji must also hold a profound dedication to their art. This means that when they perform they are fully aware that they are not only performing for themselves and their current audience, but for all past and future Kouji masters and audiences as well. Responsibilities intimately connected with this dedication are the learning of classic performances, and the commitment to passing them on to the coming generations. Beyond all aspects of Kouji mastery directly related to the performance and preservation of the art form, there is one additional characteristic that any true Kouji master must possess. This final characteristic is a profound understanding that everything which a Kouji master has, was given to him by the people and therefore truly belongs to them and not the master himself. Thus an intense commitment to the well-being of all people is also a precursor to achieving mastery in the Chinese art form of Kouji.

== Inheritance ==
A key element of Chinese Kouji is the manner in which it is passed on to successive generations. This may take the form of either family inheritance, or a combination of family and master-disciple inheritance. Perhaps partially as a result of its involvement in Chinese military code talking, Kouji disciples have been limited to citizens of the Chinese state. In fact, in 1956 Zhou En Lai refused an offer by the Soviet government to exchange their two best acrobat training programs for one Kouji training program. Although the two countries were on good terms at the time, Zhou stated that Kouji was a special cultural heritage that belonged to the Chinese, and should thus be protected.

== Videos ==
A clip of two performers

== See also ==
- Xiangsheng
- Shuochang
- Beatboxing
