= Dashan =

Canadian comedian and TV personality

Mark Henry Rowswell
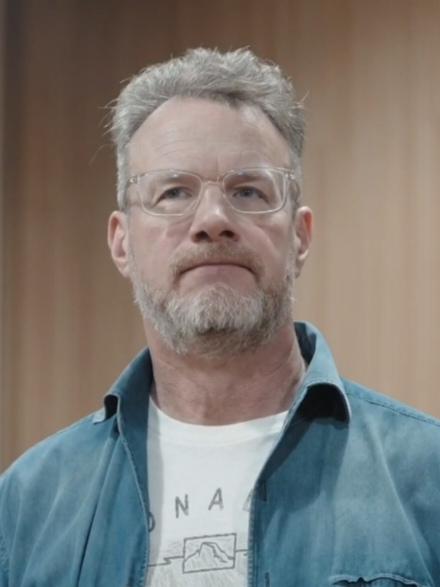
- Dashan in 2024
- Born: Mark Henry Rowswell; May 23, 1965 (age 61); Ottawa, Ontario, Canada
- Education: University of Toronto; Peking University
- Occupation: Presenter

Mark Henry Rowswell, CM (born May 23, 1965), known by his Chinese stage name Dashan (Chinese: 大山; pinyin: Dàshān; lit. 'Big Mountain'), is a Canadian performer and television personality who gained prominence in China. He became known in the late 1980s through regular appearances on China Central Television (CCTV), particularly in the traditional comedic art form xiangsheng. Although less publicly visible in Canada, he developed a significant presence in Chinese media as a non-Chinese national working in domestic programming. Since 2012, he has shifted his focus toward solo performances in live venues and has contributed to the development of the stand-up comedy scene in China.

== Early life and education ==
Rowswell was born in 1965 in Ottawa, Ontario, and attended Nepean High School. He started learning Chinese in 1979 from a refugee that he worked alongside in a camera store on Bank Street. After learning a few words, Rowswell bought books and cassettes teaching the language.

Rowswell enrolled at the University of Toronto with membership in University College, initially to study philosophy, because his parents preferred that he study abroad in China if he wanted to learn Chinese. However, Rowswell switched to formally studying Chinese early on as an undergraduate. His original Chinese name, as given by his Canadian Chinese-language teacher, was Lu Shiwei (Chinese: 路士玮) based on his surname Rowswell. Upon graduation from the University of Toronto with a Bachelor of Arts in Chinese studies in 1988, Rowswell was easily able to secure an exchange position with a full scholarship at Peking University to continue his Chinese studies.

== Early television appearances ==
Rowswell first appeared on Chinese television to co-host an international singing competition later in 1988. The producers wanted a foreigner with fluent Mandarin, and selected Rowswell from a field of candidates partly because of his Chinese studies degree from the University of Toronto. Afterwards, he was invited to perform a comedic skit on national television during the CCTV New Year's Gala, a variety program broadcast to an estimated audience of 550 million people by the state broadcaster. Rowswell portrayed a sassy peasant with a no-nonsense wife during the skit, which was called Ye gui (Chinese: 夜归). The name "Dashan" ("big mountain" in Chinese) was the name of his character in the skit, Xu Dashan (Chinese: 许大山). The skit propelled him to national stardom overnight because of his fluent Chinese and delivery.

After the 1989 Tiananmen Square protests and massacre, as many Westerners in China left as sanctions were applied, Dashan decided to stay in China and continue his career on state television. In a 2016 interview with The Globe and Mail, he called the decision "the original sin of Dashan", but also theorized that it defined him to his Chinese audience as a true friend in contrast to the fairweather friends who left.

Due to the abrupt nature of Dashan's rise to fame, he has been called an "accidental celebrity".

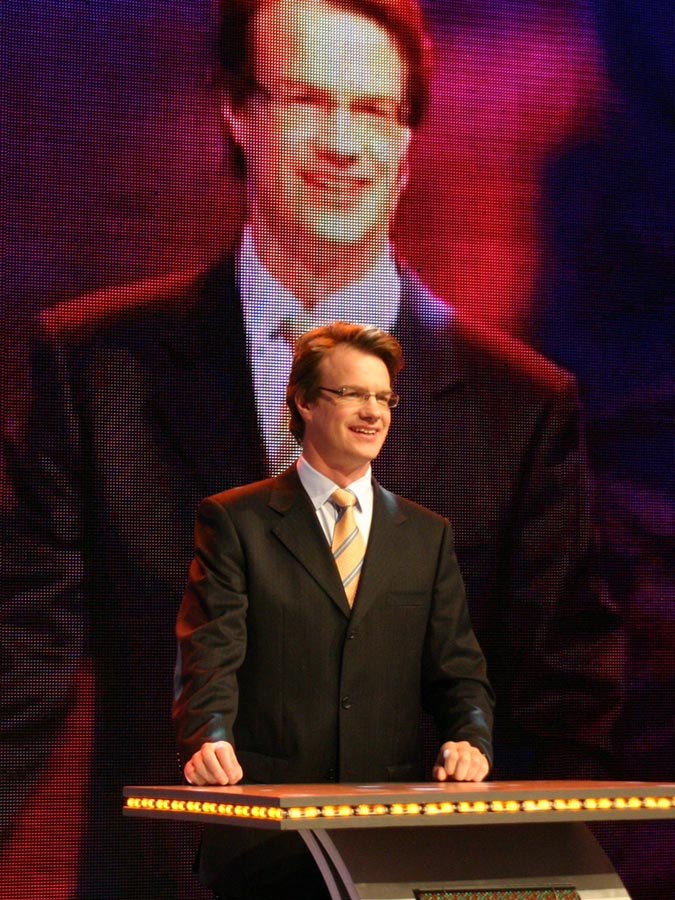
Rowswell hosting a live broadcast for China Central Television in 2006

=== Xiangsheng ===
Following Rowswell's first appearance as "Dashan", he began formal study of xiangsheng with his mentor, comedian Jiang Kun. In December 1989, Dashan became the first foreigner to be formally accepted into the strict xiangsheng hierarchy as a member of the "9th generation", a move that caused considerable controversy in Chinese performing arts circles at the time. Xiangsheng is often called "the art of comedic language", and as such is regarded in China as a highly skilled form of performing art beyond the reach of most native speakers, much less a foreigner.

=== 1990–2012 ===
==== CCTV New Year's Gala ====
Through the 1990s, Dashan appeared frequently on national and regional television programs across China to perform xiangsheng and comedic skits, including several appearances on CCTV's annual television program celebrating the Chinese New Year, CCTV New Year's Gala, in 1998 and 1999. This program is China's most watched annual television event, with an estimated audience of 900 million to 1 billion viewers. Appearances on this and other programs gained Dashan wide recognition throughout China.

Dashan's public xiangsheng performances decreased in the early 21st century. In a 2005 interview with the Chongqing Evening News, Dashan stated that he seldom performs xiangsheng due to the increased requirements that performers stick to a stipulated topic as well as exceeding audience expectations since his televised debut.

In early 2009 Dashan made a return to the CCTV New Year's Gala to perform a xiangsheng skit in which he appeared together with Ma Dong, son of the famous xiangsheng master Ma Ji. The skit received 2nd Prize in the audience choice awards announced at the end of the Chinese New Year holiday. With this performance, Dashan became (at the time) the only foreign national to have appeared on the CCTV New Year's Gala a total of three times.

Dashan made a fourth appearance on the CCTV New Year's Gala in 2011, in a skit introducing and performing with several foreign students studying Chinese at Confucius Institutes. The skit had no accompanied Chinese performers and was awarded second prize in the audience choice awards.

==== Television host ====
With the move away from xiangsheng, throughout the late 1990s and early 2000s Dashan increasingly worked in a non-comedic role as a freelance host or presenter of many varied television programs and live events, especially those with an international focus and requiring a bilingual (English/Chinese) emcee.

Dashan also hosted numerous educational programs. Most notable of these include the ESL series Dashan and Friends (Chinese: 随大山商访加拿大) and Dashan's Adventures (Chinese: 随大山万里行) and programs teaching Chinese as a foreign language for CCTV International, including Travel In Chinese (Chinese: 旅游汉语).

==== Dramatic acting ====
Dashan has occasionally delved into dramatic acting, often to portray other famous foreigners in Chinese history. In 2005, he played the lead role in a 24-part television series Palace Artist (Chinese: 宫廷画师郎世宁) broadcast by China Central Television, as the 18th-century Italian Jesuit painter Giuseppe Castiglione. In 2006 and 2007, Dashan performed the lead role in Red Star Over China (Chinese: 红星照耀中国), a stage play based on the life and work of the American reporter Edgar Snow. In 2007 and 2008 he starred in a Chinese stage adaptation of the French comedy Le Dîner de Cons (The Dinner Game in English, Chinese: 超级笨蛋), which toured across China and for which he was awarded the prestigious White Magnolia Award for best supporting actor.

==== Beijing Olympics ====
Dashan served as team attaché to the Canadian Olympic Committee for the 2008 Summer Olympics in Beijing.

==== Cultural ambassador ====
In many instances, Dashan has transcended the role of celebrity performer to become a cultural ambassador between China and the West, both in an informal as well as official capacity.

Dashan served as Commissioner General for Canada at the Shanghai 2010 World Expo.

During his official visit to China in February 2012, Canadian Prime Minister Stephen Harper announced: "For many years Mark Rowswell has used his extraordinary talents to build bridges of understanding between Canada and China. I am pleased to name this highly recognized and respected individual as Canada's Goodwill Ambassador to China."

== Current work ==
In recent years Dashan has largely turned away from television to focus on solo performances in live venues and on social media.

=== Dashan Live ===
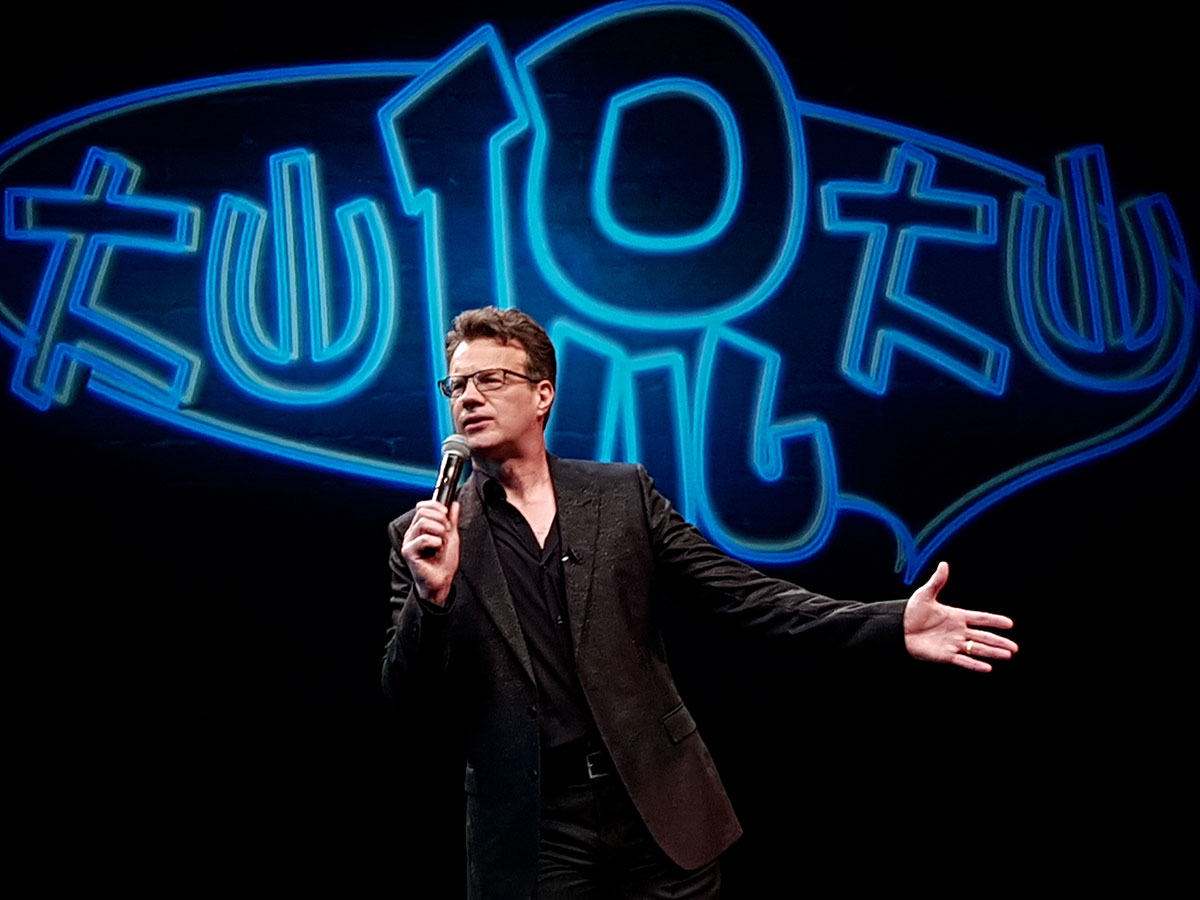
Dashan at the 2017 Melbourne International Comedy Festival

Since 2012 Dashan has been "on a mission to introduce stand-up comedy to China", performing in small clubs and at universities across China. In June 2014 he announced his plan to develop a travelling show, the Burned Out, Washed Up, Never Say Farewell tour.

This later became known as his solo comedy special Dashan Live (Chinese: 大山侃大山), which he has toured throughout China and to Chinese communities abroad.

In 2015, Dashan performed at the Flushing Comedy Club, a temporary Chinese comedy club in Flushing, Queens set up in a teahouse by Des Bishop. The club alternated all-Mandarin and all-English comedy nights; Dashan performed during the first all-Mandarin night.

In May 2016, after local officials in Suzhou shut down one of his shows, he considered leaving China for good. In 2017 Dashan was the only Mandarin performer at the 2017 Melbourne International Comedy Festival, the third-largest international comedy festival in the world.

Dashan considers his stand-up as a mix of Western stand-up and Chinese xiangsheng. In 2022, he launched another show titled Dashan’s Comedy Friends, a nearly two-hour program featuring a variety of Chinese-language comedic performances. Dashan’s Comedy Friends has been performed in Toronto, Canada; at the Silicomedy show in Silicon Valley, USA; and in a special performance in Vancouver, Canada. Local performers have also been invited to join him on stage and collaborate in the creation of the show.

=== Narration ===
Dashan's distinctive voice has been featured in many Mandarin language narration and spoken word performances, including the children's story Guess How Much I Love You as performed by Mermaid Theatre of Nova Scotia, Peter and the Wolf as performed by the New York Philharmonic in Shanghai, an original Mandarin version of The Carnival of the Animals, performed with the Toronto Symphony Orchestra and modern Chinese poetry for the popular WeChat channel "The Poem For You" (Chinese: 为你读诗).

On June 29, 2011, the National Gallery of Canada launched an audio tour that was recorded by Dashan. The tour features Dashan speaking in Mandarin about the gallery's Canadian art collection.

In 2024, Dashan returned to China to participate in the adaptation of Stephen King's The Shawshank Redemption directed by Zhang Guoli, playing the role of "Red", the narrator of the story. When asked about the play’s sensitive themes, he said, "Sure, it’s about a corrupt system that makes you think you’re trapped and you’ll never get out. But really, it’s mostly about hope. What’s wrong with that?"

=== Endorsements and cameo appearances ===
Dashan's name and image can often be seen in commercial endorsements for various Chinese and international companies, including Canadian Ford automobiles starting in 2007 and 2008. Dashan is also active as a spokesman for several charity organizations, primarily involved with cancer prevention as well as environmental protection.

=== University of Toronto Governing Council ===
On April 30, 2014, Dashan was appointed to a three-year term as a member of the Governing Council of the University of Toronto, and was renewed for another three-year term in 2017. He also serves on the university's Asia International Leadership Council.

== Personal life ==
Dashan married Gan Lin in 1993, and, as of January 2016, they have two children together. Since the late 1990s, Dashan has split his time between China and Canada, where his family has a farm near Newmarket, Ontario and a cottage near Algonquin Provincial Park.

== Awards ==
- In 1995, the National Film Board of Canada produced a documentary, directed by Guy Nantel, called Dashan, Ambassador to China's Funny Bone.
- In 1998, China's New Weekly Magazine chose Dashan as one of the "Outstanding People of the Past 20 Years".
- In 1999, Time magazine selected Dashan as one of the "Leaders for the 21st Century".
- In 2000, the University of Toronto selected Dashan as one of "100 Alumni Who Shaped the Century".
- In 2004, Dashan also received a rare "Special Recognition Award" from the Canadian Cancer Society for his work on a joint Canada-China cancer prevention program.
- In 2004, Dashan was chosen as one of "Ten Outstanding Young Adults of Beijing". This marked the first time a foreign national has received this award, one of the highest honours granted by the Beijing authorities.
- In 2006, Dashan was awarded the Key to the City of Ottawa, in recognition, as a native of Ottawa, of his contribution to furthering understanding between the peoples of China and Canada.
- In 2007, The Governor-General of Canada announced that Dashan had been appointed a member of the Order of Canada, Canada's highest civilian honour in recognition of a lifetime of outstanding achievement. The appointment had been in effect since October 5, 2006.
- In 2008, Dashan was awarded the White Magnolia Award for Best Supporting Actor for his role in The Dinner Game. This marks the first time a Westerner has received one of China's most prestigious awards for the performing arts.
- In 2009, Thompson Rivers University (Kamloops, BC, Canada) bestowed an Honorary Doctorate on Dashan recognizing his efforts to build global connections between cultures and economies through international education. The Honorary Doctorate was presented by TRU during its Convocation ceremony on June 26 at the Tianjin University of Technology, Tianjin, China.
- In 2018, Dashan was awarded an honorary degree by the University of Alberta.
