= Zhao Manqin =

Chinese musician and educator

Zhao Manqin (Chinese: 赵曼琴; born in 1953) is a Chinese musician and educator. He is a member of the Chinese Musician's Association, Director of the Chinese National Orchestra Society, Visiting professor at the China Conservatory of Music.

Zhao Manqin developed the kuaisu zhixu (Fast Finger Sequence Technique System) which drew on the playing techniques of piano, violin, and pipa.

== Biography ==
Zhao Manqin was born in 1953 in the Xinye County of Henan Province, China. He started writing and publishing music at the age of 16. Zhao Manqin attended the Xinye County Middle School in 1965 and continued his education at the Seaman School in Xinye County in 1962. He later attended the Xinye County Middle School. Due to his father's persecution during the Cultural Revolution, Zhao was sent to perform agricultural work in the countryside in 1966. Despite this, he continued his involvement in music and joined various performance groups, including the Xinye County Cultural Troupe in 1972.

In 1972, he developed the kuaisu zhixu (Fast Finger Sequence Technique System), which drew on the piano, violin, and pipa playing techniques. This system is widely used by the Guzheng industry in China.

In 1978, his fast-fingering composition, "The Sun is Shining Red on Jinggang Mountain", was included in the curriculum of the Central Conservatory of Music.

From 1980, he was invited lecturer at major music conservatories and academies in China and internationally, including the Central Conservatory of Music, Folk Music Department of the Central Conservatory of Music, Xi'an Conservatory of Music, Xinghai Conservatory of Music, Shanghai Conservatory of Music, Normal University Music College, Guangxi Arts College, Kunming Medical University, Eastman School of Music in the United States and the National Australian University in Australia.

In the mid-1980s, he began work on Guzheng education and established the Guzheng Art Institute. He subsequently conducted educational courses in Zhengzhou, Luoyang, Kaifeng, Xinzheng, Xingyang, Henan Youtian, Nanyang, and Haikou and provided training to professional and amateur Guzheng teachers across China.

In 1986 his work "Symmetry and Inertia" was presented at the First National Guzheng Academic Conference along with the performance of the Guzheng piece dahu shangshan (Fighting the tiger in the mountain) by his disciple Wang Zhongshan using the fast fingering he developed which led to the recognition of his technique.

Many of his students and master class students hold leading positions in various music performance groups and music institutions, including, Wang Zhongshan (Professor at China Conservatory of Music), Li Meng (Professor at the Central Conservatory of Music), Fan Yifeng (Professor at Xi'an Conservatory of Music), Wang Wei (Professor at Shanghai Conservatory of Music), Luo Xiaoci (Director of Shanghai National Orchestra), Gao Liang (Professor at Shenyang Conservatory of Music), Chen Weimin (Associate professor at Xinghai Conservatory of Music), Zhang Tong (Professor at Harbin Normal University), Sun Zhuo (Professor at Shaanxi Normal University), and Mao Ya (Lecturer at the University of Tokyo in Japan), and others.

== Guzheng performance techniques ==
In 1972, he developed the kuaisu zhixu (Fast Finger Sequence Technique System) which drew on the playing techniques of piano, violin, and pipa. This system is widely used by the Guzheng industry in China. This system solved the limitation of Guzheng in playing fast passages of heptatonic scale and facilitated the inclusion of the Guzheng to perform with the rest of the traditional instruments in an orchestra setting. This system changed three finger wearing plectra playing in octave symmetry to all eight fingers wearing plectra plucking approach. This change expanded the potential Guzheng fingering sequences, allowing playing fast passages of pentatonic scale, heptatonic scale, and chromatic scale.

In 1978, his fast-fingering composition, "The Sun is Shining Red on Jinggang Mountain", was included in the curriculum of the Central Conservatory of Music.

After the 1986 presentation of his work "Symmetry and Inertia" at the First National Guzheng Academic Conference, along with the performance of the Guzheng piece dahu shangshan (Fighting the tiger in the mountain) by his follower Wang Zhongshan using the fast fingering he developed, his technique gained recognition. This performance contributed to the nationwide spread of Zhao Manqin's fast finger sequence compositions such as "The Sun is Shining Red on Jinggang Mountain", "Climbing the Mountain to Beat the Tiger", "Ode of Shan Dan Flower", "Evening Party", and "Hora Dance". It also led to the nationwide implementation of the fast-fingering system into Guzheng practice and performance. Composers subsequently started to compose contemporary repertoires using the fast-fingering sequence techniques, including "Dance of Yi Tribe", "Spring in Xiangjiang River", "Eternal Lament of Li'an", "The Fantasia", "The Caprice of the Western Regions", "Ming Mountain" and "Forest Spring". Most of these pieces have been chosen as part of the grade 9 and grade 10 repertoire for the National Examination Board.

== Selected compositions ==
- "Fantasy of the Embroidered Gold Plaque" – First prize in the Henan Provincial Ethnic Instrumental Music Awards in 1983.
- "Moon Gazing" – First prize in the Henan Provincial Ethnic Instrumental Music Awards in 1983.
- "The Sun Shines Over Jinggang Mountain" – Second prize in the Henan Provincial Instrumental Music Awards in 1983.
- "Gazing at the Moon" – Award of Encouragement, "National Third Music Works Competition" held by the Ministry of Culture and China Musicians Association in 1984.
- "Springing from the Roaring Yellow River" (Collaboratively composed piece) – awarded the Second Prize in Vocal Composition by the Henan Musicians Association in 1985.
- "Soul of the Yellow River" – Gold Award at the second "Star Award" competition held by the Ministry of Culture, Ministry of Education, and Ministry of Broadcasting in 1991.
- "The Melody of Henan" – Gold Award at the 15th "Star Award" competition held by the Ministry of Culture in 2010.

== Publications ==
- "A Brief History of the Guzheng", published in "Music Research," (the most authoritative academic journal in China), issue 4,1981.
- "Symmetry and Inertia", published in the "Proceedings of the National Guzheng Academic Exchange Conference" and "Discussion on Guzheng Study", 1986.
- "On the Application of Percussion in Nanyang Opera" (co-authored), published in "Opera Art",1982.
- "Urgent Problems Affecting the Development of Guzheng Art", published by the Chinese National Symphony Orchestra in the "Guzheng Collection of Papers", 1999.
- "Problems in Guzheng Performance Mechanics- A Discussion with Mr. He Baoquan", published in the "Qin Zheng", Issue 1, 2006
- "The Artistic Crisis of Guzheng Under its Prosperous Appearance", presented at the Beijing International Guzheng Art Festival (Highest National level Forum), 2008
- "Questioning the Temperament of Chinese Folk Music", published in the "Journal of Henan Education College, Philosophy and Social Edition", 2010.
- "A Preliminary Exploration of the Pitch of Shaanxi Guzheng Performance", published in "Qinzheng", Issue 1 and 2, 2010 and issue 1, 2011.
- "New Theory of Temperament", published in the "Journal of Henan Education College", issue 2, 2019.

== Books ==
- "An Introduction to Guzheng Fast Finger Sequence Technique" (Volumes I and II), published by China Culture Publishing Company, 2002. ISBN 978-7-80105-941-3
- "Zhao Manqin's Guzheng Teaching Sheet Music", published by Tongxin Publishing House, 2004. ISBN 978-7-80593-936-0
- "The Way to Practice Basic Guzheng Skills" (Volumes I, II, and III, co-author Zhao Guanhua), published by Shanghai Music Publishing House, 2012.
- "The Way to Practice Guzheng Fast Finger Sequence" (Volumes I and II, co-author Zhao Guanhua), published by Shanghai Music Publishing House, 2012.
