= Fan Lei (clarinetist) =

Fàn Lei 范磊
- Born: January 27, 1965 (age 61); Qingdao, China
- Genres: Classical
- Occupations: Clarinetist, teacher, entrepreneur, author
- Instrument: Clarinet
- Years active: 1991–present
- Label: Mark Records
- Website: bmf.org.cn/en/yinyuejie14_yishujia_xiangxi_fanlei.html

Fàn Lei (Chinese: 范磊; born January 27, 1965) is a Chinese–American clarinetist, teacher, author, and entrepreneur. Fàn Lei has performed as a clarinet soloist and recitalist throughout the United States, Canada, Europe and Asia. He won first prize at the 1985 Chinese National Clarinet competition and was chosen to represent the People's Republic of China at the Toulon International Competition in France, where he also won honors. He has authored several books on clarinet technique and is currently a professor at the Central Conservatory of Music in Beijing, China and a visiting professor at Xi'an Conservatory of Music and Shenyang Conservatory of Music. He is the founder of the International Mozart Clarinet Competition and the International Wind and Percussion Music Festival.

== Early life ==
Fàn Lei was born in Qingdao, China in 1965. At the age of twelve, he left home to study in Beijing at the Central Conservatory of Music primary school. He would go on to study with some of the world's finest clarinetists including Tao Chunxiao, Elsa Ludewig-Verdehr, Lawrence McDonald, David Shifrin, Fred Ormand, and Kalmen Opperman. He was awarded top prize at the International Young Clarinetist Competition in Seattle, Washington, and was one of two finalists along with Todd Palmer in the 1991 Young Concert Artists International Auditions in New York City. He received his bachelor's degree from the Oberlin Conservatory of Music and graduate degrees from the Yale School of Music.

== Career ==
=== Performing ===
Fàn Lei's playing has been broadcast in the United States (WQXR-FM) and Canada (CBC/Radio-Canada) and he has appeared on Chinese, American and European television. He has collaborated with many of the world's leading musicians such as Patrick Gallois, Stephen Maxym, Edgar Meyer, Richard Killmer, David Shifrin, the Muir String Quartet among others. He was principal clarinet of the Green Bay Symphony Orchestra and is a founding member of the Norfolk Trio at the Norfolk Chamber Music Festival in Connecticut. He has been a visiting artist at the Banff Centre for the Arts and has made recordings of Francis Poulenc, Claude Debussy, Sergey Prokofiev, Béla Bartók and George Gershwin.

=== Notable performances ===
Fàn Lei gave Sextet (Penderecki) its North American premier and premiered James Cohen's Three Pieces for Clarinet. He has performed as a soloist for the United States Secretary of State and the Prime Ministers of Canada and the United Kingdom.

== Teaching ==
Fàn Lei is currently a professor at the Central Conservatory of Music in Beijing, China and a visiting professor at Xi'an Conservatory of Music and Shenyang Conservatory of Music. He was a professor of music and chair of the Wind, Brass and Percussion Department at Lawrence University from 1993 to 2006. He has given master classes at the Yale School of Music, Juilliard School, Manhattan School of Music, Oberlin Conservatory of Music, National Taiwan University of Arts, Interlochen Center for the Arts, the Banff Centre for the Arts and several academies in China including The China Army Music Academy.

His students have been awarded top prizes at the 2011 Ghent International Clarinet Competition in Belgium, 2014 and 2010 Mravinsky International Competition in St. Petersburg, 2013 and 2011 Mozart International Clarinet Competition in Beijing, 2014 Konrad Wolff-Ilse Bing Competitions in the United States, Golden Bell Awards, and numerous others throughout the world. Other students have gone on to join the faculties of various universities and professional ensembles.

=== Competition Adjudication ===
Fàn Lei served as a judge for the 2014 Markneukirchen clarinet competition in Germany, 2014 Chinese Music Golden Bell Awards, 2010 Ghent International Clarinet Competition in Belgium, the 2009 and 1998 International Clarinet Competition in China and the National Arts Club Clarinet Competition in New York City.

== Business career ==
Fàn Lei founded the International Mozart Clarinet Competition, a prestigious competition held annually in Beijing, China. He also established the International Wind and Percussion Music Festival which draws hundreds of top music students each year from around the world. He was also the Artistic Director for the 2002 and 2005 International Clarinet and Saxophone Festival in Xi’an, China.
