= Zu Hai =

Chinese singer (born 1976)

- 祖海
- Born: May 10, 1976 (age 50); Bengbu, Anhui, China
- Education: China Conservatory of Music
- Occupation: Singer
- Years active: 1999–present
- Musical career
- Genres: Mandopop, ethnic music, military song

Chinese name
- Chinese: 祖海
Transcriptions
Standard Mandarin
- Hanyu Pinyin: Zǔ Haǐ

Zu Hai (Chinese: 祖海; pinyin: Zǔ Haǐ, born May 10, 1976) is a Chinese singer.

== Biography ==
Zu was born in Bengbu, Anhui in 1976, her father is an electrician.

During her childhood years, Zu developed an interest in singing, dancing and experimented with several different vocal techniques after listening to the songs of popular female singers such as Li Guyi and Teresa Teng.

Zu attended Bengbu Fourth High School in 1991. She entered University in China Conservatory of Music in 1999 and she joined the Chinese People's Liberation Army Naval Song and Dance Troupe in 2003.
