= Chen Sisi (singer) =

Chinese singer

- 陈思思
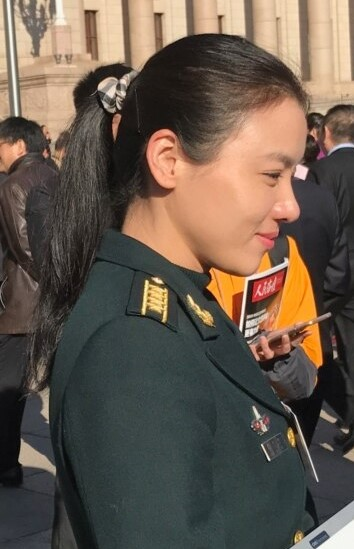
- Chen in 2021
- Born: December 28, 1976 (age 49); Changde, Hunan, China
- Education: Huaihua College; Hunan Normal University; People's Liberation Army Academy of Art
- Occupations: Singer, philanthropist, politician
- Years active: 2002-present
- Musical career
- Genres: Mandopop, Ethnic music, Military song

Chinese name
- Traditional Chinese: 陳思思
- Simplified Chinese: 陈思思
Transcriptions
Standard Mandarin
- Hanyu Pinyin: Chén Sīsī

Chen Sisi (Chinese: 陈思思; born 28 December 1976) is a Chinese singer, philanthropist, and politician. Chen is a member of Chinese Communist Party and vice-president of the People's Liberation Army Second Artillery Corps Song and Dance Troupe. She holds the rank of Senior Colonel in the People's Liberation Army, was a member of 10th National People's Congress, and a Standing Committee member of the All-China Youth Federation.

Chen is the first singer from mainland China to play a personal concert in Taiwan.

== Biography ==
Chen was born in Changde, Hunan in 1976, with her ancestral home in Nanjing, Jiangsu.

Chen graduated from the Hunan Provincial Changde City No. 7 Middle School. She studied at Huaihua College of Hunan in 1990 and graduated from the Music Department of Hunan Normal University in 1995. She entered the People's Liberation Army Academy of Art for master's studies in 1999, and successively studied under Chinese vocal music educators Professor Jin Tielin and Professor Li Shuangjiang.

Chen joined the People's Liberation Army Second Artillery Corps Song and Dance Troupe in 1999; as of 2012, she was the vice-president of the People's Liberation Army Second Artillery Corps Song and Dance Troupe.

In 2009, Chen played a personal concert in Taiwan.

== Works ==
=== Television ===
Year	English title	Chinese title	Role	Cast	Ref
2000	Qu Yuan	屈原	Du Ruozi	Jiang Kai, Tan Feiling, Wang Ji, Wu Liping	

=== Studio albums ===
- My Boyfriend is going to South China (Chinese: 情哥哥去南方)
- Chinese Girl (Chinese: 中国女孩)
- Liusanjie (Chinese: 刘三姐)
- You Really Touched Me (Chinese: 你让我感动)
- Have a Good Time Together (Chinese: 共度好时光)
- Nice Time (Chinese: 锦绣年代)

== Awards ==
- Golden Eagle Award (2005)
