= Guo Feng (musician) =

Chinese singer (born 1962)

- 郭峰
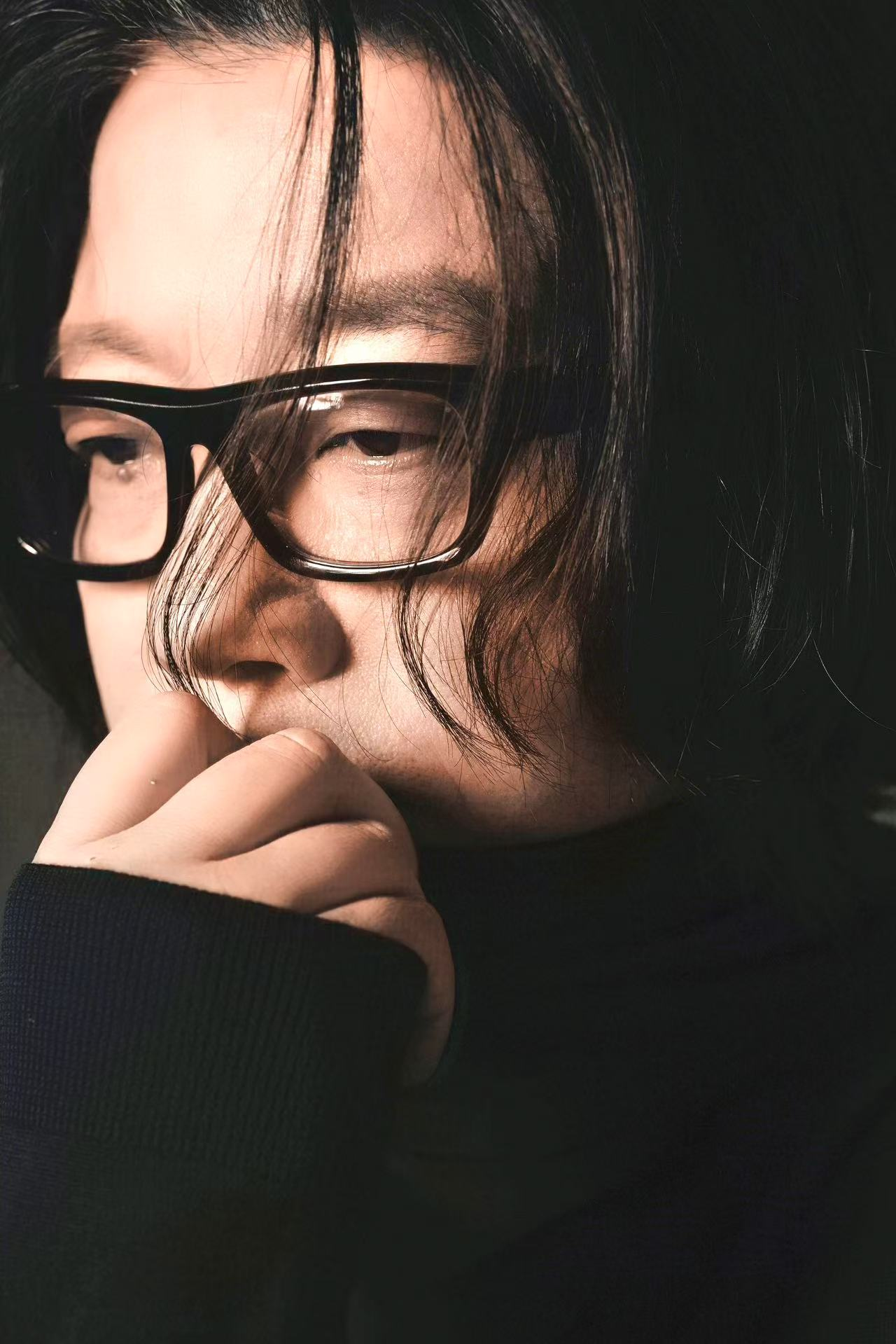
- Born: 14 September 1962; Chengdu, China
- Occupations: Songwriter; singer; painter
- Years active: 1984–present (as of 2026)
- Musical career
- Genres: Pop; electronic; Rock; crossover music
- Instruments: Vocals; keyboards

Guo Feng (born September 14, 1962) is a Chinese songwriter and singer. He is regarded as a pioneer of original Chinese pop music. During the 1980s, when pop music in mainland China was still in its early stages and most mainland singers primarily performed covers of songs from Hong Kong, Taiwan, and overseas, Guo composed a significant number of original songs that became popular.

In 1986, he organized a charity concert titled Let the World Be Filled with Love: The First Concert of 100 Stars, which has been described as a turning point for pop music in mainland China and as contributing to its further development. The theme song of the concert, "Let the World Be Filled with Love", has since been performed in numerous versions by singers, bands, and civic organizations.

Around 1990, Guo moved to Japan and later to Singapore, where he spent several years writing songs and arranging music for singers, as well as for film and television productions in Japan, Singapore, Hong Kong, and Taiwan. Since 1995, he has been active in mainland China, continuing his work as a songwriter while also performing as a singer.

== Overview ==
Guo Feng has composed hundreds of musical works across a wide range of themes and genres. His repertoire includes sentimental ballads, charity songs, and explorations of electronic music, rock music, Chinese folk, and Japanese Enka. He has also experimented with crossover compositions that combine elements of classical, folk, and pop music.

Guo's first widely recognized pop composition was the charity single "Let the World Be Filled with Love", released in 1986. In May that year, he initiated and organized the concert Let the World Be Filled with Love: The First Concert of 100 Stars—A Tribute to the International Year of Peace, commemorating the United Nations' International Year of Peace. The concert, held on 9 May at the Beijing Workers' Stadium, featured the theme song Let the World Be Filled with Love, which Guo composed, arranged, and produced, also performing as its keyboardist. The cassette sold more than three million copies and gained nationwide recognition. A total of 128 singers performed the song at the concert, breaking with the then-prevailing unofficial restriction that no more than two pop singers could share a stage in mainland China. The performance is considered an important milestone in the development of original Chinese pop music. Following its success, official media referred to Guo as "the first person to initiate original pop music in China" and "the first person of mainland Chinese pop music". The song has remained influential; it was included as part of the opening ceremony of the 2022 Beijing Winter Olympics. Some scholars argue that the piece introduced a new song form to Chinese pop music, effectively creating the first pop suite in mainland China. Guo was 24 years old when he composed it.

In addition to "Let the World Be Filled with Love", Guo has written a number of public welfare choral works, including "Children of the Earth" (1987, environmental theme), "With You, With Me" (1996, disability awareness theme), "Believe in Love" (2008, anti-epidemic theme), and "Wish" (2015, supporting Beijing's Winter Olympics bid). His repertoire also includes popular love ballads such as "Let Me See You Again" (1984, performed by Zhu Hua), "The Struggles of Love" (1985, performed by Tian Zhen), "Longing for Love" (1987, performed by Wei Wei), "The Heart Walks with Love" (1993, performed by Kit Chan), "Don't Say Leave If You Want to Leave" (1994, performed by Su Rui), and "Willingly" (1995, performed by Linda Wong).

Guo also explored electronic music. After moving to Japan in the late 1980s, he signed with Nippon Columbia Records and released the electronic music album Yellow in 1991. The album was co-produced with Mikie Yoshino of the Japanese band Godiego, with Guo writing all lyrics and music. The record received positive reviews for its experimental arrangements, which blended traditional Chinese instruments with Western electronic elements. Japanese magazine CD Journal praised its "unique mystical emotions" and its reworking of Chinese melodies and rhythms. In its 1994 annual publication CD Bible, Hong Kong's Hi-Fi Audio Magazine described the album as "a representation of the highest achievement of Japanese studio production", highlighting its sound dynamics and spatial qualities, particularly the track Dance (舞). In 2000, mainland China's Hi-Fi Audio magazine commended Yellow for combining "the unrestrained nature of modern pop with the elegance of traditional Chinese ethnic music", describing it as "a recording that can withstand the test of time".

Beyond pop and electronic music, Guo has also written Chinese folk songs, enka, and rock pieces. His folk works include "The Road" (1987, performed by Dong Wenhua) and "Our Country, Sweet Songs and Fragrant Flowers" (1983, performed by Yan Weiwen), both performed at China Central Television's Spring Festival Gala. He composed the enka song "Hana Zakari" (1995) for Japanese singer Umezawa Tomio and contributed to rock music with works such as "Monologue of the Heart" (1985, performed by Cui Jian) and "Star in the Heart" (1985, performed by Wei Wei). Some of his compositions also blended folk and rock elements, including "How Much I Want" (1985, performed by Cheng Fangyuan) and "Answer Myself" (1987, performed by Cai Guoqing). He also applied the classical suite format to pop music, producing works such as "Sincerity and Love" (1987) and "Ode to the Olympics" (2015).

== Life ==
=== Early years ===
Guo Feng was born in 1962 in Chengdu, Sichuan Province, China. Influenced by his father, who was also a composer, he began studying music at an early age. He started learning piano at the age of three and was admitted to the piano program of the Sichuan Art School (now the Sichuan Arts Vocational College) at 13. At 14, he published his first composition, a song titled "Moonlight".

=== 1980–1983 ===
In 1980, at the age of 18, Guo graduated from school and became a teacher. Around this time, he also became the youngest member of the Chinese Musicians' Association. He composed three popular folk songs during this period: "How Much I Want" (1981), "The Road" (1982), and "Our Country, Sweet Songs and Fragrant Flowers" (1983). All three were later performed at China Central Television's Spring Festival Gala—by Cheng Fangyuan (1986), Dong Wenhua (1988), and Yan Weiwen (1988)—and became signature works in each singer's career. "How Much I Want" was performed and recorded by numerous artists throughout the 1980s, including Wu Xiaoyun, Tian Zhen, Wu Jing, Li Lingyu, Su Hong, Hang Tianqi, Cai Guoqing, and Guo himself.

=== 1983–1988 ===
At the end of 1983, Guo moved to Beijing to pursue his career, joining Huaguoshan Band—the first pop band in China—as a keyboardist and composer.

In 1984, Guo recorded his first personal album, Heart Tide, considered the first album in mainland China where one individual was responsible for all lyrics, composition, arrangement, and vocals. It included songs such as "Let Me Look at You Again" (later covered by Wei Wei) and "Twists of Love" (later covered by Tian Zhen on her 1995 album Monica).

After the band disbanded in 1985, Guo joined the Oriental Song and Dance Troupe as a composer and keyboardist. He produced music for several films and television series, including The Superstar (1985), This Year Here (1986), and Operation Hurricane (1986). That year, he also released New Stars in the Music World, an album featuring twelve songs performed by twelve singers, including Tu Honggang, Zhu Hua, Cui Jian, and Wei Wei. Several tracks employed rock backbeats, an uncommon feature in Chinese pop music at the time. His composition "Answer Me" won the gold medal at the 1986 Peacock Cup National Youth Popular Song Competition. In the same year, Wei Wei won second prize at the National Young Singers TV Grand Prix with her performance of Let Me Look at You Again, launching her professional career.

On May 9, 1986, Guo organized the charity concert, Let the World Be Filled with Love: The First Concert of 100 Stars—A Tribute to the International Year of Peace. He served as composer, arranger, producer, conductor, and keyboardist for the theme song, "Let the World Be Filled with Love", and also provided "Heart Song" (sung by Zhao Li), "How Much I Want" (sung by Wu Xiaoyun), and "Light Flow" (also known as "Time Is Passing", sung by Wei Wei). The event is regarded as a milestone in Chinese pop music, and the cassette of the theme song sold over three million copies.

Guo subsequently represented China at international events, including the Hiroshima International Peace Music Festival (1986) and a tour with the Oriental Song and Dance Troupe in the United States, Mexico, Chile, Colombia, and Venezuela. Between 1987 and 1988, he composed several public service songs, such as "Children of the Earth" (1987, environmental theme), "Friend of Mankind" (1988, wildlife conservation theme), and "Sincerity and Love" (1988, reintegration of former prisoners). He also composed music for the films The Last Madness and Oh Sisterhood, and for the television series Frenzy.

During this period, Guo's work helped usher in a number of singers' career highs. On August 20, 1987, Wei Wei won the 24th Sopot International Song Festival for her performance of "Star in the Heart". In November 1988, Wei Wei won the Gold Prize in the Yugoslavia Mechem International Music Festival with her performance of "Love Search". In December 1988, Zhang Qiang won the Special Prize for Singing at the 25th Sopot International Song Festival for his performance of "The Same Ancestor". In addition, the cassette "Let the World Be Full of Love" won the 1986–1987 National Cassette Gold Medal in December 1987; the song "Answer Yourself" won an award of excellence in the Central People's Broadcasting Station's Teenage. "Answer Yourself" won an award of excellence in the China School Songwriting Grand Prix initiated by the Central People's Broadcasting Station on 14 October 1988, which was sponsored by the Central People's Broadcasting Station.

In 1988, a series of five concerts titled Love World: Young Composer Guo Feng's Works was held at the Beijing Exhibition Hall Theatre, featuring 23 of his works performed by leading singers of the time. A commemorative album was also released.

=== 1988–1995 ===
At the end of 1988, Guo Feng traveled to Japan and signed with Nippon Columbia. While writing and producing music albums in Japan, Guo Feng mastered computer music technology.

In 1990, he composed the theme music for the Japanese TBS television film Are You Asian?. In the same year, as a representative of China, he participated in various major international music events in Japan, such as the Hiroshima Peace Concert, Yokohama Expo, Pacific Expo, Asian Music Festival, etc.

In 1991, he published and released his solo music album, Yellow, in Japan. The arrangement of seven tracks was co-produced by Guo Feng and Mikie Yoshino, a member of Japan's Godiego, with Guo Feng writing the lyrics and music himself. The album was critically acclaimed in Japan, the United States, Hong Kong, and Taiwan. The album was highly praised for its avant-garde arrangements and exquisite production, which blended traditional Chinese multi-ethnic instruments with Western electronic music. The editors of the Japanese music magazine CD Journal praised the album for its unique mystical emotions, reconstructing China's distinctive melodies, rhythms, and sounds. In its 1994 annual publication, CD Bible, Hong Kong's Hi-Fi Audio Magazine commented: "After listening to this disc, you will be amazed, as Guo Feng, though living in the mainland, has a highly modern composition style. This album, Yellow, represents the highest achievement of Japanese studio production; its instrument positioning, dynamics, and bass impact are exceptionally rare. One track, 'Dance', has such a sense of space, instrument detail, and shocking bass that it will leave you astonished." In the same year, Guo Feng performed solo concerts in Yokohama, Fukuoka, Shibuya, and Ginza.

Since then, Guo Feng has traveled to Singapore to develop his career, signing with Ocean Butterflies as a full-time music producer. During his time in Singapore, Guo Feng worked as a music producer for a number of film and television productions, including the television series Three Faces of Eve (March 1991), The Day of Love in the Net of the Law (October 1991), and The Wonderful Ghosts of the House (March 1993), and he has composed a large number of songs for singers from Hong Kong, Taiwan, and Singapore (Nana Pao, Su Rui, Chen Jieyi, Ke Yimin, Wang Xinping, Gang Zebin, etc.). Some of them are widely sung, such as "The Heart Will Go with Love" (1993) for Chen Jieyi, "Don't Say Go" (1994) for Su Rui, and "Wishful Thinking" (1995) for Wang Xinping. These songs were later performed by Guo Feng himself and became representative of his identity as a singer.

In 1994, Guo Feng's solo album Sober, produced by Xu Huanliang, was released in Singapore, with Guo Feng himself writing, arranging, performing, and singing all the lyrics and music.

=== 1995–2000 ===
By 1995, the music market in mainland China had begun to take shape, and Guo Feng returned to China, debuting as a singer (previously, although the release of the album "Tides of the Heart" in 1985 and his stage performances during his time with the Oriental Song and Dance Troupe suggested that Guo Feng might be one of the earliest singer-songwriters in mainland China, his primary work was still behind the scenes, and the media had long defined his role as a "composer" or "musician" rather than a "singer"). In the same year he returned to China, Guo Feng, along with Mao Amin, received the "Special Honor Award" at the 2nd Oriental Music Awards.

Between 1995 and 2000, Guo Feng released the studio albums "With You and Me" (1995), "Transfer of Affection" (1996), "You've Taken My Whole Heart" (1997), "I Feel Like Crying Before You" (1999), and compilation albums "Guo Feng's Glory 1981-1996" (1996), "Guo Feng's Best of 97" (1997), "Willingly" (1999), and "Classic Guo Feng 1980-2000" (2000), as well as the MV collection "Guo Feng Forever OK" (1998), and took the lead in creating all the songs in these albums; he held the personal concert "Forever Guo Feng" (1998) and released the concert soundtrack "Forever Guo Feng - Music Concert" (1998). In 1999, Guo Feng also made his first appearance in a film, co-starring with Xu Qing, Pu Cunxin, and Tao Hong in the movie "Let's Not Break Up", and was responsible for the production and performance of the film's music.

While managing his entertainment career, Guo Feng once again created a large number of public welfare songs, following his works from the 1980s, such as "Let the World Be Filled with Love" and "Children of the Earth". These include "With You and Me" in 1996 to commemorate the 50th anniversary of the anti-fascist war, "Young Heart" in 1997 to support the national "National Fitness Campaign", "Embrace" in 1999 to welcome the return of Macau, and "Realizing the Dream" in 2000 to support Beijing's bid for the Olympic Games. In 2000, Guo Feng initiated the "Realizing the Dream" chorus event with a thousand people and launched the nationwide tour "I Sing for the Olympics".

=== 2001–present ===
After 2000, Guo Feng released studio albums "Guo Feng NEW11" (2001), "Burning" (2004), "HIGH TIME Passion Moments" (2005), and compilation albums "Guo Feng Embrace 1980-2004" (2004), as well as the MV collection + photo album "Guo Feng All". In 2015 and 2018, he held personal concerts, "Guo Feng LIVE Concert" and "In the Name of Classics" solo concert, and released the concert soundtracks "Guo Feng LIVE Concert" (2015) and "In the Name of Classics Modern Pop Piano Hits" (2018).

During this period, Guo Feng became more intensively involved in the creation of public welfare songs than ever before, with works focusing on themes such as supporting the development of sports, caring for vulnerable groups, and enhancing social cohesion. In 2001, he composed the theme song "We Are Friends" for the 21st Summer Universiade held in Beijing and the theme song "Fluttering Red Ribbon" for the National AIDS Prevention Conference. In 2003, he composed "Walking Together" to support the fight against the SARS epidemic. In 2005, he composed the suite "Ode to the Olympics" to promote the Beijing Olympics and organized a concert named "Ode to the Olympics Large-Scale Music Event" at the Imperial Ancestral Temple of the Beijing Working People's Cultural Palace. In 2008, he composed "Believe in Love" to support earthquake relief efforts in Wenchuan. In 2015, he composed "Life" to promote the International Day Against Drug Abuse and Illicit Trafficking and "Wish" to support Beijing's bid for the Winter Olympics. In 2017 and 2018, he composed the patriotic songs "China" and "We", respectively. In 2018, he composed the closing ceremony theme song "Come on, Friend" for the 15th Shanxi Provincial Games. In 2019, he was awarded the title of "Ambassador for Helping the Disabled" by the China Disabled Persons' Federation and composed the song "Sunshine of Love" to support disabled people, and in the same year, he composed the theme song "China, Watch Me" for the 2nd National Youth Games. In 2020, he composed a trilogy of songs, "Never Give Up", "Wait for Me to Come Home", and "Stubborn Flower", to support the fight against the COVID-19 pandemic. In 2021, he composed the theme song "Running for Love" for the 6th Chongqing Municipal Games for Persons with Disabilities. In 2024, he composed the theme songs "Asia" and "Today and Tomorrow" for the 19th Asian Games held in Hangzhou, China.

== Works ==
=== Personal albums ===
Albums composed by Guo Feng
Number	Release Year	Album Name	Album Type
1	1984	"Heart Tide"	Studio Album
	1985	"'Super Star' Movie Soundtrack"	Soundtrack
2	1985	"Shining New Stars"	Studio Album
3	1986	"Let the World Be Filled with Love"	Collaborative Studio Album
4	1986	Dream Journey"Dream Journey"	Soundtrack
5	1987	Dream Journey"Sincerity and Love"	Collaborative Studio Album featuring multiple artists
6	1988	Dream Journey"Friend of Humanity"	Collaborative Studio Album featuring multiple artists
7	1988	Dream Journey"World of Love"	Collaborative Concert Album featuring multiple artists
8	1991	Dream Journey"Yellow"	Studio Album
9	1994	Dream Journey"Awakening"	Studio Album
10	1995	Dream Journey"With You, With Me"	Studio Album
11	1996	Dream Journey"Fickle Love"	Studio Album
12	1996	Dream Journey"Brilliant Guo Feng 1981－1996"	Greatest Hits Collection
13	1997	"You Have Taken My Heart Completely"	Studio Album
14	1997	"97 Guo Feng's Selection"	Greatest Hits Collection
15	1998	"Guo Feng Forever OK"	Greatest Hits Collection
16	1998	"Forever Guo Feng—Music Concert"	Concert Album
17	1999	"Can't hold back my tears in front of you."	Studio Album
18	1999	"Willingly"	Greatest Hits Collection
19	2000	"Classic Guo Feng: 1980-2000"	Greatest Hits Collection
20	2001	"Guo Feng NEW11"	Studio Album
21	2003	"Guo Feng Piano Solo, Classic Works Personal Concert"	Concert Album
22	2004	"HIGH TIME"	Studio Album

=== Charity records ===
No.	Release Year	Song Title	Performer	Creative Motivation	Included in Album
1	1986	"Let the World Be Full of Love"	Group Performance	In commemoration of the International Year of Peace	"Let the World Be Full of Love"
2	1987	"Children of the Earth"	Group Performance	In commemoration of the International Year of Environmental Protection	"Brilliant Guo Feng 1981－1996"
3	1988	"Friends of Humanity"	Group Performance	In commemoration of the International Wildlife Protection Organization	"Brilliant Guo Feng 1981－1996"
4	1996	"With You and Me"	Group Performance	In commemoration of the 50th Anniversary of Anti-Fascism	
5	1997	"Young Hearts"	Group Performance	To promote the "National Fitness Campaign" initiated by the State Sports Commission	"Brilliant Guo Feng 1981－1996"
6	1999	"Embrace"	Group Performance	Welcoming the Return of Macau	
7	2000	"Realize Dreams"	Group Performance	Supporting the Olympic Bid	
8	2001	"We are Friends"	Guo Feng	Theme Song of the 21st Summer Universiade	
9	2001	"Floating Red Ribbons"	Zu Hai, Gu Juji	Theme Song of the National AIDS Prevention Conference	
10	2002	"Heart in Hand"	Guo Feng, Black Panther Band, Zero Band	Theme Song of the National Water Skiing Championship	
11	2003	"Walking Together"	Guo Feng	Supporting the Fight Against SARS	"Guo Feng Classics 1980 - 2000"
12	2004	"Burning"	Chou Chuan Hsiung, Li Keqin	Theme Song of the Athens Olympic Torch Relay in Beijing	
13	2005	"Ode to the Olympics"	"See suite information	Celebrating the Fourth Anniversary of Beijing's Successful Olympic Bid	
14	2006	"Sing China"	Guo Feng	Theme Song of the 12th National Youth Singer TV Grand Prix	
15	2010	"Outstanding Future"	Guo Feng	Theme Song of the Chinese Professional Basketball League (CBA)	
16	2015	"Life"	Group Performance	Dedicated to International Day Against Drug Abuse	
17	2015	"Wish"	Children's Choir	Supporting the Olympic Bid	
18	2017	"China"	Group Performance	"Chinese Dream" Theme Song (Fifth Batch)	
19	2018	"We"	Guo Feng	"Chinese Dream" Theme Song (Sixth Batch)	
20	2018	"Come On, Friends"	Guo Feng	Theme Song of the 15th Shanxi Provincial Games Closing Ceremony	
21	2019	"Sunshine of Love"	Group Performance	Song for the Disabled	
22	2019	"China, Watch Me"	Ju Hongchuan, Zhou Xuan, He Kexin, Qin Kai	Theme Song of the 2nd Youth Games	
23	2020	"Never Give Up"	Guo Feng	Supporting the Fight Against COVID-19	
24	2020	"Wait for Me to Come Home"	Guo Feng	Supporting the Fight Against COVID-19	
25	2020	"Stubborn Flower"	Guo Feng	Supporting the Fight Against COVID-19	
26	2021	"Running for Love"	Guo Feng	Theme song for the 6th Chongqing Disabled Games	

=== Film and television music ===
No.	Country/Region	Year	Film/TV Show	Type	Vocal Tracks
1	China	1985	Super Star	Film	Theme song "Theme Song of 'The Big Star'"; Insert songs "A Glance at You Again", "How Much I Wish", "Raindrops", "Only I Know", "Lunch Box Dance", "Why" (performed by Wu Xiaoyun, included in the soundtrack "Film Insert Songs of 'The Big Star'")
2	China	1986	This Year Here	TV Drama	Insert songs "Hang Li La", "Sister's Tune", "Sixteen This Year", "Hiding from the Moon", "Green Clouds", "Star Song" (performed by Nakano Ryoko, included in the soundtrack "Journey of Dreams")
3	China	1986	Hurricane Operation	Film	Unknown
4	China	1987	Let the World be Full of Love	Film	Theme song "Let the World be Full of Love" (performed by various artists)
5	China	1987	The Last Frenzy	Film	Insert song "Star in My Heart"; End song "Wind and Stars"
6	China	1988	Hi! Sisters	Film	Theme song "Hi! Sisters" (performed by Xiao Mei and Guo Feng)
7	China	1988	Tide	TV Drama	Unknown
8	China	1988	Gunless Robber	Film	Unknown
9	Singapore	1991	Three Faces of Eve	TV Drama	Theme song "Love Misplaced"; Insert songs "Love is Not Right or Wrong", "The Magic of Love" (performed by Bao Nana)
10	Singapore	1992	Under the Legal Net	TV Drama	Theme song "Sunny Life"; End song "Just Want to Hold Your Hand Again" (performed by Chen Zhikai)
11	Singapore	1993	The Arrival of the Ghost	TV Drama	Theme song "Bringing You My Love" (performed by Chen Zhikai)
12	China	1995	More Thoughtful Youth	TV Drama	Theme song "Youth" (performed by Wei Wei); End song "Forever" (performed by Guo Feng)
13	China	1995	Foreign Girl in Beijing	TV Drama	Theme song "FOREIGN GIRL IN BEIJING" (performed by Guo Feng); End song "Love You Forever" (performed by Guo Feng and Liang Yanling)
14	China	2000	Agree Not to Break Up	Film	Theme song "My LOVE TO YOU"; Insert song "Change of Heart" (performed by Guo Feng)

=== Compositions for others' albums ===
No.	Country/Region	Year	Performer	Album	Role	Composed Songs
1	Mainland China	1985	Wu Xiaoyun	"Hometown Road"	Composer, Arranger	"Suspended Golden Bell", "How Much I Wish"
2	Mainland China	1987	Wu Xiaoyun	"Songs Left in the Hometown"	Composer, Arranger	"Let the World be Full of Love", "How Much I Wish"
3	Mainland China	1986	Wei Wei	"Wei Wei Album: A Glance at You Again"	Composer, Arranger	"A Glance at You Again"
4	Mainland China	1989	Wei Wei	"Star in My Heart"	Composer, Arranger	"Star in My Heart", "Love Search"
5	Mainland China	1987	Tian Zhen	"Monica"	Composer, Arranger	"Love's Twists and Turns"
6	Mainland China	1999	Yan Weiwen	"Yan Weiwen Solo Album"	Composer	"Our Motherland's Song Sweet and Fragrant"
7	Mainland China	1999	Dong Wenhua	"Dong Wenhua Solo Album"	Composer	"Road"
8	Japan	1986	Nakano Ryoko	"Journey of Dreams"	Composer, Arranger, Producer, Performer	"Star Song" and fourteen others
9	Japan	1989	Umezawa Fumio	"One Person, Ten Colors" (いちにん十色)	Composer	"Blossoming" (華ざかり), "Dream Game" (夢遊戯)
10	Singapore	1992	Edmund Chen	"Sunny Life"	Composer, Arranger, Producer, Performer	"Sunny Life", "Just Want to Hold Your Hand Again"
11	Singapore	1993	Kit Chan	"Don't Hurt the Harmony"	Composer, Arranger	"Don't", "Heart Goes with Love", "Dinosaur Tribe"
12	Taiwan	1991	Bao Nana	"Journey of Life"	Arranger, Producer, Performer	-
13	Taiwan	1994	Su Rui	"Change of Heart"	Composer	"Don't Leave Just Because You Want to"

=== Film appearances ===
- Agree Not to Break Up (Released in 1992, directed by Fu Jingsheng / Fei Ming, starring Pu Cunxin / Xu Qing / Guo Feng / Tao Hong / Yu Hongzhi) – Played Zhang Ke – 1999

== Performances ==
=== Concerts, music events, and galas ===
No.	Year	Event Name	Event Type	Performed Pieces	Recorded Media
1	1986	"Let the World be Full of Love: First Hundred Stars Concert - In Honor of International Year of Peace"	Charity Concert	Composer: "Let the World be Full of Love", "Heart's Melody", "How Much I Wish", "Light Flow"	Album "Let the World be Full of Love"
2	1988	"1988 CCTV Spring Festival Gala"	Charity Gala	Performance: "Film and TV Song Medley", Composer: "Our Motherland's Song Sweet and Fragrant" (Composer), "Road"	Video Tape "1988 CCTV Spring Festival Gala"
3	1988	"World of Love: Guo Feng Works Concert"	Guo Feng Works Concert	All tracks composed, arranged, and performed	Album "World of Love"
4	1998	"Forever Guo Feng - Music Concert"	Solo Concert	All tracks composed, arranged, and performed	Album "Forever Guo Feng - Music Concert"
5	2003	"Guo Feng Piano Solo and Classic Works Solo Concert"	Solo Concert	All tracks composed, arranged, performed, and sung	Album "Guo Feng Piano Solo and Classic Works Solo Concert"
6	2004	"Olympic Ode Grand Music Gala"	Charity Concert	All tracks composed, arranged, and performed	CCTV Live Broadcast; "Chinese Olympic Champions Recording: Olympic Ode Grand Music Gala" (Beijing Zhongti Audiovisual Publishing Center, 2008)

"Olympic Ode Grand Music Gala"
No.	Movement	Piece	Performer	Lyricist	Composer
1	First Movement: Dream Olympics	Ignite the Sacred Fire	Guo Feng (Instrumental)	Guo Feng	Guo Feng
2	First Movement: Dream Olympics	My Homeland	Chen Ming, Lin Yilun	Song Xiaoming	Guo Feng
3	First Movement: Dream Olympics	Burning	Zhou Chuanxiong, Li Keqin	Gao Youhua	Guo Feng
4	Second Movement: Love for Olympics	Realizing Dreams	Huo Feng, Jiang Tao, Wang Zhengzheng	Guo Feng	Guo Feng
5	Second Movement: Love for Olympics	Heart in Motion	Zhu Hua, Zhang Xin Zhe	Guo Feng	Guo Feng
6	Second Movement: Love for Olympics	GO	Arirang Group	Guo Feng	Guo Feng
7	Second Movement: Love for Olympics	Wipe Away Tears	Han Lei, Guo Feng	Guo Feng	Guo Feng
8	Third Movement: Hand in Hand with Olympics	Heart and Hand Connected	various singers	Guo Feng	Guo Feng
9	Third Movement: Hand in Hand with Olympics	Every Day with You	Han Hong	Guo Feng	Guo Feng
10	Fourth Movement: One World, One Dream	Tonight Belongs to You	Di Li Bai Er, Mo Hualun	Qiao Fang	Guo Feng
11	Fourth Movement: One World, One Dream	Crazy for You	Nicholas Tse	Qiao Fang	Guo Feng
12	Fourth Movement: One World, One Dream	We Are Friends	various singers	Guo Feng	Guo Feng
" Recorded media: CCTV Live Broadcast; "Chinese Olympic Champions Recording: Olympic Ode Grand Music Gala" (Beijing Zhongti Audiovisual Publishing Center, 2008)

== Media ==
=== Television media interviews ===
- 20101028, "Tonight's Show", Tianjin TV, "Tonight's Show: Guo Feng: My Hairstyle Never Changes, My Music Sounds Great"
- 20111012, "A Date with Luyu", Phoenix TV, "Lu Yu Has an Appointment: Guo Feng Special"
- 20110321, "Happy Dictionary", CCTV-3, "Happy Dictionary Special Program: Happy Fans' Gathering - Guo Feng Special"
- 20111210, "Starry Night Story Show", Beijing TV Arts Channel, "Starry Night Story Show: Guo Feng Special"
- 20151008, "Art Life", CCTV-3, "Art Life: Guo Feng Album (Part 1)"
- 20151126, "Art Life", CCTV-3, "Art Life: Guo Feng Album (Part 2)"
- 20180724, "Music Life", CCTV-3, "Music Life: Guo Feng - The Number One in Mainland Chinese Pop Music"
- 20190824, "Who's Coming", Tianjin TV, "Who's Coming: Guo Feng Special"
- 20221008, "Who's Coming", Tianjin TV, "Who's Coming: Zhu Hua Special"

=== Singing competition judge ===
- 2000, 9th "Bubugao Cup" CCTV National Youth Singer TV Grand Prix, Judge
- 2006, 12th "Longliqi Cup" CCTV National Youth Singer TV Grand Prix, Judge
- 2013, China Central Television Opera and Music Channel "Striving for Excellence" - 2013 "Mongolian, Tibetan, Uyghur, Hui, and Yi" Champion Singer Contest Season 1 Final, Judge
- 2013, 2013 "Water Cube Cup" Overseas Chinese Youth Chinese Song Competition Final, Judge
- 2017, Global Chinese Pop Singer Competition "Sing Out the Star Path" Season 1 Final, Judge
- 2018, Global Chinese Pop Singer Competition "Sing Out the Star Path" Season 2 Final, Judge

=== Variety show guest ===
- "Brave More and More", China Central Television Variety Channel, Regular Guest
- "Global Chinese Music List", China Central Television CCTV Variety Channel, Regular Guest
  - 2016: Performed Songs "Is It?" (2016-06-25), "Forever" (2016-10-22), "We Are Friends" (2016-04-30), "Don't Wait Too Long" (2016-08-06)
  - 2017: Performed Songs "China" (2017-10-21, 2017-12-30), "Forever" (2017–12–3), "Strong" (2017-05-27)
  - 2018: Performed Songs "China" (2018-09-29), "Forever" (2018-09-15), "Willing" (2018-12-29), "Let the World be Full of Love" (2018-09-15), "My Friend" (2018-06-30), "Heart Goes with Love" (2018-09-15), "We" (2018-12-29)
  - 2019: Performed Song "Heart Goes with Love" (2019-12-28)
  - 2021: Performed Song "With Your Accompaniment" (2021-05-01)

== Awards ==
Awards received by Guo Feng and his works
Year	Recipient/Project	Awarding Body	Award	Result
1986	"Answer Me"	China Musicians Association	"Peacock Cup" National Youth First National Folk and Popular Song Competition Gold Award	Won
1987	"Let the World be Full of Love"	China Musicians Association	1986-1987 National Cassette Tape Gold Award	Won
1988	"Answer Yourself"	China Central People's Broadcasting Station "Youth Era" Program Group	First "China Campus Song Creation Competition" Excellence Award	Won
1990	"Let the World be Full of Love"	China Musicians Association, China Youth Development Foundation	Second "Songs Loved by Contemporary Youth" Second Prize	Won
1990	"A Glance at You Again"	China Musicians Association, China Youth Development Foundation	Second "Songs Loved by Contemporary Youth" Third Prize	Won
1995	Guo Feng	Second Oriental Wind and Cloud Billboard	Second Oriental Wind and Cloud Billboard "Special Honor Award"	Won
2008	"Let the World be Full of Love"	National Popular Music Gala and 30th Anniversary of Reform and Opening-up Popular Golden Song Award Ceremony	"30th Anniversary of Reform and Opening-up Popular Golden Song"	Won
2018	"China"	Global Chinese Music Billboard	Global Chinese Music Billboard 2018 "Best Chinese Song"	Won
2022	"Let the World be Full of Love"	China Arts Research Institute	List of One Hundred Art Works Under the "Speech" Spirit	Listed
