= Jin Tielin =

Chinese musician and artist (1940–2022)

- 金铁霖
- Born: 21 June 1940; Harbin, Binjiang Province, Manchukuo
- Died: 15 November 2022 (aged 82); Beijing, China
- Education: Central Conservatory of Music
- Occupations: Musician, artist
- Years active: 1981–2022
- Spouse(s): Li Guyi; Ma Qiuhua
- Children: 1
- Musical career
- Genres: Ethnic music, military song

Chinese name
- Traditional Chinese: 金鐵霖
- Simplified Chinese: 金铁霖
Transcriptions
Standard Mandarin
- Hanyu Pinyin: Jīn Tiělín

Jin Tielin (Chinese: 金铁霖; 21 June 1940 – 15 November 2022) was a Chinese vocal professor, musician and artist. His disciples include Peng Liyuan, Li Guyi, Dong Wenhua, Tang Can, Song Zuying, Zhang Ye, Li Danyang, Yan Weiwen, Liu Bin, Lü Jihong, Dai Yuqiang, Zhang Yan, Zu Hai, Wang Lida, Chen Lili, Chang Sisi, Zhu Zhiwen, Leon Lai, and Michelle Reis. In 2006, he started Jin Tielin Vocal Arts Center (金铁霖声乐艺术中心) in the China Conservatory of Music. Later, on 2 April 2013, Jin Tielin Vocal Arts Center was renamed and expanded to be Jin Tielin Chinese Vocal Education and Research Center (金铁霖中国声乐教研中心) in the China Conservatory of Music.

== Biography ==
On 21 June 1940, Jin was born in Harbin, Binjiang Province (now Heilongjiang), then under the jurisdiction of Manchukuo. He is of the Manchu ethnic group. His father was a hospital director.

Jin Tielin graduated from the Central Conservatory of Music in 1965. After graduating, he was assigned to the Central Philharmonic Orchestra as a singer.

From 1981, Jin has worked in the China Conservatory of Music. From 1996 to 2009, he acted as the president of China Conservatory of Music.

== Personal life and death ==
Li Guyi (李谷一) was Jin Tielin's first wife. She is a singer. Jin's second wife was Ma Qiuhua (马秋华), a professor at China Conservatory of Music. They had a son named Jin Shengquan (金圣权).

On 15 November 2022, he died in Beijing, at the age of 82.

== Sources ==
- 《中华好家风》金铁霖 马秋华：音乐之家, 中国河北卫视官方频道 China Hebei TV Official Channel, 2015-7-15
- 金铁霖 中国著名声乐教育家，博士生导师 中国音乐学院 China Conservatory of Music Official Website. Retrieved 30 July 2019
- 金铁霖中国声乐教研中心 中国音乐学院 China Conservatory of Music Official Website. Retrieved 30 July 2019
- 马秋华 著名声乐教育家 中国音乐学院 教授 博士生导师 中国音乐学院 China Conservatory of Music Official Website. Retrieved 30 July 2019
