= Yu Junjian =

Chinese singer (born 1956)

Yu Junjian 郁钧剑
- Born: April 16, 1956 (age 69); Guilin, Guangxi, China
- Genres: Military song
- Occupation: Singer
- Years active: 1971–present

Chinese name
- Traditional Chinese: 郁钧剑
- Simplified Chinese: 鬱鈞劍
Transcriptions
Standard Mandarin
- Hanyu Pinyin: Yù Jūnjiàn

Yu Junjian (Chinese: 郁钧剑, born April 16, 1956) is a Chinese singer.

== Biography ==
Yu was born in Guilin, Guangxi, in 1956. He entered Guilin Song and Dance Troupe in 1971 and he joined the Chinese People's Liberation Army Naval Song and Dance Troupe in 1979. Later, he was graduated from China Conservatory of Music and Peking University. In December 2002, he acted as chairman in China Federation of Literary and Art Circles.

Yu is actively involved in politics himself, and was a member of the 9th, 10th, 11th and 12th National Committee of the Chinese People's Political Consultative Conference.
