= Lü Jihong =

Chinese singer

- 吕继宏
- Born: June 27, 1960 (age 66); Tianshui, Gansu, China
- Education: Xi'an Conservatory of Music
- Occupation: Singer
- Years active: 1989-present
- Musical career
- Genres: Ethnic music, military song
- Label: Point Records (点时唱片)

Chinese name
- Traditional Chinese: 呂繼宏
- Simplified Chinese: 吕继宏
Transcriptions
Standard Mandarin
- Hanyu Pinyin: Lǚ Jìhóng

Lü Jihong (Chinese: 吕继宏; born June 27, 1960) is a Chinese singer.

== Biography ==
On 27 June 1960, Lü was born in Tianshui, Gansu Province. He graduated from Xi'an Conservatory of Music in 1982. His teacher was Tao Liling (陶立玲). After graduating, he worked in Lanzhou Normal School as a teacher.

In 1985, Lü transferred to Gansu Song and Dance Troupe and the Chinese People's Liberation Army Naval Song and Dance Troupe in 1989, where he started to learn the arts of music from Jin Tielin.

== Discography ==
- The flower Fragrance (花儿飘香)
- The Communist Party, I want to say to you (党啊，我想对你说)
- At This Very Moment (此时此刻)
- Port of The Sunset (军港的晚霞)
- Daban City's Nocturne (达板城的夜曲)
- In The Eyes of The World (在世界的眼睛里)
- The Country Is Prosperous And The People Are At Peace (国泰民安)
- The Common People (咱老百姓)
- Mother's Songs (妈妈的歌谣)
- You Love The Sun Forever (你爱太阳到永远)
- Northland of Love (北国之恋)
- My Chinese Heart, My Love of The Sea (中国心，大海情)
