= Chen Lili (singer) =

Chinese singer

- 陈笠笠
- Born: Chen Lili (陈莉莉); December 23, 1981 (age 44); Changsha, Hunan, China
- Education: China Conservatory of Music
- Occupation: Singer
- Years active: 2005–present
- Musical career
- Genres: Ethnic music, military song

Chinese name
- Traditional Chinese: 陳笠笠
- Simplified Chinese: 陈笠笠
Transcriptions
Standard Mandarin
- Hanyu Pinyin: Chén Lìlì

Chen Lili (Chinese: 陈笠笠; December 23, 1981) is a Chinese singer.

== Biography ==
At the age of 8, Chen studied music under Li Li (李莉) at Xiaodujuan Art Troupe (小杜鹃艺术团). She was educated in Hubei Art Vocational College from 1996 to 1999, her teacher was Xiao Shuyun (肖淑云) and Yu Hui (余辉). From 1999 to 2004, she was educated in China Conservatory of Music, her teacher was Jin Tielin.

In 2004, Chen worked in Beijing Song and Dance Troupe, she joined the Chinese People's Liberation Army Naval Song and Dance Troupe in 2007.

== Discography ==
- Ode To Red Flag (红旗颂)
- Bless You (祝福你)
- Chinese Seal (中国印)
