= Chang Sisi =

Chinese singer

- 常思思
- Born: May 6, 1987 (age 39); Jinan, Shandong, China
- Education: China Conservatory of Music
- Occupation: Singer
- Years active: 2008-present
- Musical career
- Genres: Ethnic music, military song, opera

Chang Sisi (Chinese: 常思思; pinyin: Cháng Sīsī; born May 6, 1987, in Jinan, Shandong) is a Chinese singer.

She was accepted into the China Conservatory of Music in 2005. She studied music under Jin Tielin and Liu Chang. In March 2008, she joined the Chinese People's Liberation Army Naval Song and Dance Troupe. In 2016, she performed in I Am A Singer 4.
