= Tang Can =

Chinese singer (born 1975)

- 汤灿
- Born: 12 June 1975 (age 51); Lichuan, Hubei, China
- Education: Wuhan Conservatory of Music
- Occupation: Singer
- Years active: 1995–2011
- Musical career
- Genres: Ethnic music, military song

Chinese name
- Traditional Chinese: 湯燦
- Simplified Chinese: 汤灿
Transcriptions
Standard Mandarin
- Hanyu Pinyin: Tāng Càn

Tang Can (Chinese: 汤灿; born 12 June 1975) is a Chinese singer.

== Biography ==
Tang was born in Lichuan, Hubei in 1975. Since childhood she developed an interest in singing and dancing. She is a graduate of Wuhan Conservatory of Music.

In 1996, she joined the Dongfang Song and Dance Troupe (东方歌舞团) and performed in 1998 in the CCTV New Year's Gala. In 1999, she started to learn the arts of music from Jin Tielin.

On 13 September 2010, Tang joined the Chinese People's Liberation Army Naval Song and Dance Troupe.

In 2011, Tang disappeared. Some news reports said she was involved in corruption cases. In June 2016 it was reported that she had been released from prison after having served a sentence for corruption.

In 2023, Tang has reappeared in several performances.
