= Meng Ge =

- 梦鸽
- Born: Liu Qingdi (刘清娣); 1966 (age 59–60); Shashi, Hubei, China
- Education: China Conservatory of Music; People's Liberation Army Arts College; Central Conservatory of Music
- Occupation: Singer
- Years active: 1990-present
- Spouse: Li Shuangjiang
- Children: Li Tianyi
- Musical career
- Genres: Pop, dance

Chinese name
- Traditional Chinese: 夢鴿
- Simplified Chinese: 梦鸽
Transcriptions
Standard Mandarin
- Hanyu Pinyin: Mèng Gē

Liu Qingdi
- Traditional Chinese: 劉清娣
- Simplified Chinese: 刘清娣
Transcriptions
Standard Mandarin
- Hanyu Pinyin: Liú Qīngdì

Meng Ge (Chinese: 梦鸽; born 1966) is the stage name of Liu Qingdi (刘清娣), is a Chinese military singer.

== Biography ==
Meng Ge was born in Shashi, Hubei province in 1966. At the age of eight, influenced by her mother, she performed her first stage show. She attended the China Conservatory of Music, the Chinese People's Liberation Army Arts College, and the Central Conservatory of Music. After graduating, she joined the Chinese People's Liberation Army Naval Song and Dance Troupe.

== Personal life ==
In 1990, at the age of twenty-four, she and her professor Li Shuangjiang, twenty-seven years her senior, married in Beijing. They have a son named Li Tianyi.
