= Ode to HIT =

"Ode to HIT 哈工大之歌"

Song
- Published: 7 June 2008
- Genre: Alma mater
- Composer(s): Liu Xijin
- Lyricist(s): Liu Zhongde

"Ode to HIT" (Chinese: 哈工大之歌; pinyin: Hāgōngdà zhī gē; lit. '(The) Song of HIT') is the alma mater of Harbin Institute of Technology. Liu Zhongde (Class of 1957) was the lyricist and Liu Xijin was the composer. The new official version was released in 2017, and was sung by the Chinese soloist Yan Weiwen and The Choir of HIT. The song is sung on significant occasions, including enrollment, ceremonies and graduation.
