= Song Zuying =

Chinese classical/folk singer

- 宋祖英
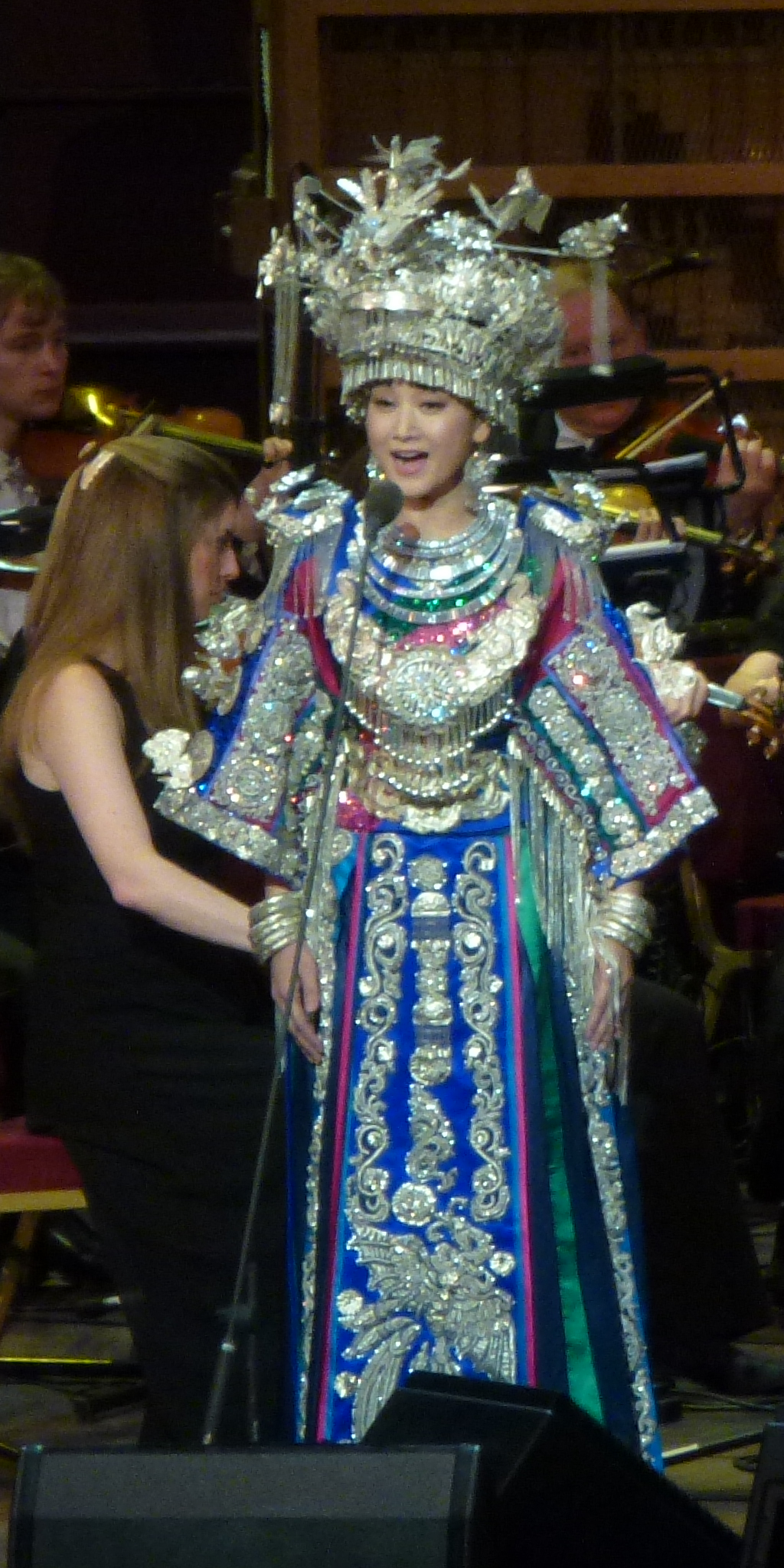
- Song Zuying singing Dragon Boat Melody (龙船调) in Miao costume at the East Meets West concert at the Royal Albert Hall, London in June 2012.
- Born: August 13, 1966 (age 60); Guzhang County, Hunan, China
- Education: China Conservatory of Music
- Occupation: Singer
- Years active: 1988-present
- Political party: Chinese Communist Party
- Spouse: Luo Hao
- Relatives: Song Jialing (sister)

Song Zuying (Chinese: 宋祖英; pinyin: Sòng Zǔyīng; born August 13, 1966) is a Chinese classical/folk singer. In 2006, she received a Grammy nomination for Best Classical Crossover Album for Song Zu Ying: The Diva Goes To The Movies at the 49th Annual Grammy Awards.

== Early life ==
Song Zuying was born in August 1966 into a farming family in Guzhang County, in the Xiangxi Tujia and Miao Autonomous Prefecture of Hunan. Her father died of a lung disease when she was 12. She is of Miao ethnicity. In 1981, without formal training, she joined the Guzhang County opera troupe, and in 1984, she moved to the Xiangxi Prefecture Song and Dance Troupe. In 1985, she entered the music and dance department of the Central University for Nationalities (now Minzu University of China), and after winning a national young singers' competition in 1988, she began studying with the vocal teacher Jin Tielin. She later took a master's degree at the China Conservatory of Music, and from 2009, she studied there under Jin for China's first doctorate in ethnic folk singing, which she completed in 2012.

== Career ==
=== National fame and the navy ===
Song first appeared on the CCTV Spring Festival Gala in 1990, singing "Little Back Basket", and she performed at the gala every year for 24 years, until 2013. Her other well-known gala songs include "Spicy Girl" and "Good Days", and in 2009, she and Jay Chou performed a duet of his song "Herbalist's Manual". In 1991, she joined the People's Liberation Army Navy Political Department Song and Dance Troupe as a soloist. She became its deputy head in 2005, and in August 2013, she was appointed its head, the first woman to hold the post. Her civilian cadre grade is equivalent to that of a major general.

=== International concerts and events ===
On 20 December 2002, Song gave a solo concert at the Sydney Opera House, the closing event of celebrations of the 30th anniversary of China–Australia relations, becoming the first Chinese or Asian singer to give a solo concert there. In November 2003, she gave a solo concert in the Golden Hall of the Musikverein in Vienna. After her concert at the Kennedy Center in Washington on 12 October 2006, Mayor Anthony A. Williams proclaimed the day "Song Zuying Day" in the District of Columbia, and in May 2007, the Kennedy Center's international committee awarded her its Gold Medal in the Arts.

Her 2005 album of Chinese film songs, Song Zu Ying: The Diva Goes to the Movies, was nominated for Best Classical Crossover Album at the 49th Annual Grammy Awards. At the closing ceremony of the 2008 Summer Olympics in Beijing, she sang the theme song "Flame of Love" with Plácido Domingo, and in 2010, she and Jackie Chan opened the opening ceremony of Expo 2010 in Shanghai. In February 2014, she performed at the New York Philharmonic's Lunar New Year concert at Lincoln Center, which kept her from that year's Spring Festival Gala. In 2016, Song performed for Chinese military personnel at Fiery Cross Reef in the Spratly Islands, a disputed territory in the South China Sea claimed by China and several other neighbouring countries. The performance, accompanied by approximately 50 naval entertainers, took place amid tensions over China's land reclamation and construction of military infrastructure on the reef.

== Public life ==
Song was a member of the 11th and 12th National Committees of the Chinese People's Political Consultative Conference. In 2006, she set up an education foundation in Hunan to support poor students in her home region.

== Personal life ==
Song met her husband, Luo Hao, a television director, at a singing competition in 1988, and they married in 1992. They have a son, born in 2005.

=== Investigation for corruption ===
In January 2018 it was reported that Song was under investigation for corruption as part of General Secretary Xi Jinping's anti-corruption campaign in connection to an alleged misuse of public funds in the financing of her personal musical concerts in 2002, 2003, and in 2006.

In February 2018 Song's name was removed from the list of attendees of the CPPCC.

== Discography ==
- Song Zuying & China Philharmonic Orchestra: Epics Of Love - An Anthology of Ancient Chinese Poetry (Stockfisch, 2015)

== Filmography ==
- Wan-chun (1990)
