= Zhang Ye (singer) =

Chinese singer (born 1968)

- 张也
- Born: May 28, 1968 (age 58); Changsha, Hunan, China
- Education: Hunan Vocational College of Art; China Conservatory of Music
- Occupation: Singer
- Years active: 2000–present
- Musical career
- Genres: Ethnic music, military song

Chinese name
- Traditional Chinese: 張也
- Simplified Chinese: 张也
Transcriptions
Standard Mandarin
- Hanyu Pinyin: Zhāng Yě

Zhang Ye (Chinese: 张也; born May 28, 1968) is a Chinese singer.

== Biography ==
Zhang was born in Changsha, Hunan province in 1968. Zhang entered Hunan Vocational College of Art to learn the art of Chinese opera when she was 14. Zhang was graduated from China Conservatory of Music in 1991, her teacher was Jin Tielin.

== Works ==
- Enter the New Age (走进新时代)
- Hello, Motherland (祖国你好)
- Everything Goes Well (万事如意)
- Enjoy a Happy Get-together (欢聚一堂)
- Extend Auspicious Wishes (吉祥颂)
