= We Are All Americans =

1918 song by Fanny Hodges Newman

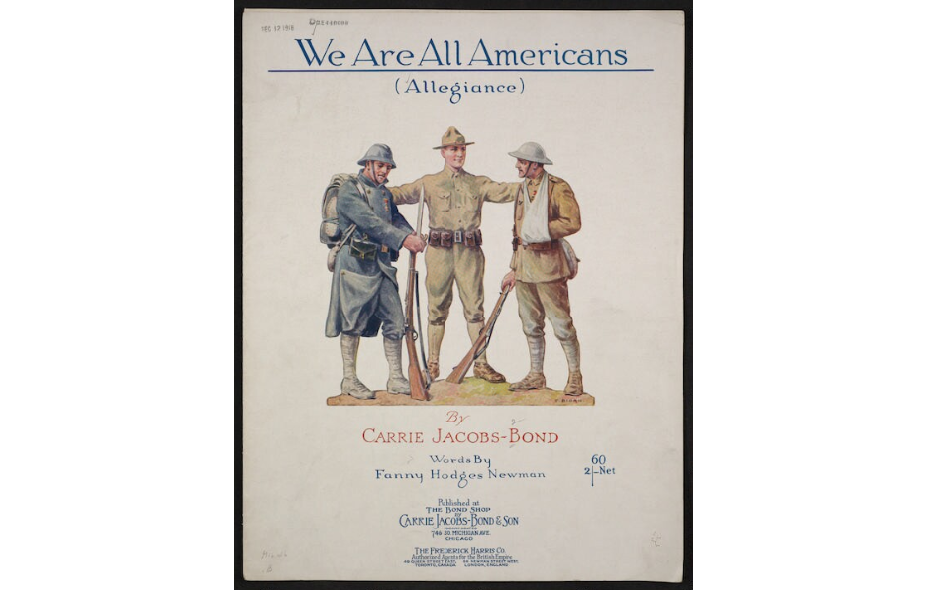

Song
- Composer: Carrie Jacobs-Bond
- Lyricist: Fanny Hodges Newman

"We Are all Americans (Allegiance)' is a song written during World War I with music composed by Carrie Jacobs-Bond and lyrics written by Fanny Hodges Newman. It is found in the Library of Congress record of notable music.

A similar song in feeling with the same title from 1914 by O. S. Grinnell was "dedicated to those unemployed as a result of the war."

Jacobs-Bond's song was one of more than 4,500 patriotic songs written in 1918 and the second song of that name composed in Chicago that year. "We Are All Americans (Allegiance)" is composed of three verses, was originally written for a voice and piano format, and is addressed to "Miss Margaret Woodrow Wilson".

== See also ==
- Carrie Jacobs-Bond
- Pritzker Military Museum & Library
- War song
