= Zhang Miao =

Zhang Miao may refer to:

- Zhang Miao (politician) (died 195), official in the late Eastern Han dynasty of China
- Zhang Miao (cyclist) (born 1988), Chinese cyclist
- Zhang Miao (table tennis) (born 1991), Chinese para table tennis player
- Zhang Miao (1984–2010), murder victim in the Yao Jiaxin murder case
