= Bomber Command (song) =

Song
- Published: 1943
- Genre: War-time song
- Composer(s): Paul Taubmanin
- Lyricist(s): Ellis O. Keller, Gene Marvey

"Bomber Command" is a song with lyrics by Ellis O. Keller and Gene Marvey and music by composed by Paul Taubmanin. The song was published in 1943 by Carl Fischer, Inc.

This song was dedicated to the United States Air Force Bombardment Unit and upon its release quickly became the plug tune for Carl Fischer, Inc.
