= Liu Min =

Liu Min may refer to:

- Liu Min (劉敏), official and calligrapher of the Shu Han state in the Three Kingdoms period of China
- Liu Chong (895–954), founder of the Northern Han dynasty of China, later changed his name to Liu Min (劉旻)
- Liu Min (dancer) (刘敏) (born 1958), Chinese military dancer
