= Guo Feng =

Guo Feng may refer to:

- National Customs, or Guo Feng, 1935 Chinese film
- Kwok Fung (born 1951), or Guo Feng, Hong Kong actor
- Guo Feng (politician) (郭峰; 1915–2005), Chinese politician
- Guo Feng (musician) (郭峰; born 1962), Chinese singer
