= Chen Sisi =

Chen Sisi or Sisi Chen is the name of:

- Chen Sisi (actress), Chinese actress
- Chen Sisi (singer), Chinese singer

== See also ==
- Sisy Chen, Taiwanese politician
