= Pang Long =

Chinese singer

Pang Long 庞龙
- Born: May 2, 1971 (age 55); Fuxin, Liaoning, China
- Genres: Mandopop
- Occupation: Singer
- Instrument: Guitar
- Years active: 2005–present
- Labels: Beijing Niaoren Art Promotion co, ltd. (北京鸟人艺术推广有限公司)

Pang Long
- Traditional Chinese: 龐龍
- Simplified Chinese: 庞龙
Transcriptions
Standard Mandarin
- Hanyu Pinyin: Páng Lóng

Pang Long (Chinese: 庞龙; born May 2, 1971) is a Chinese singer. Two Butterflies and You are My Rose are his representative works.

== Biography ==
Pang was born in Fuxin, Liaoning, China in 1971, his father is a miner, he has 3 older sisters.

After graduating from vocational high school, he worked as a worker. Pang studied music under Zhang Mu (张牧) in 1994. Pang entered Shenyang Conservatory of Music in 1997.

Pang joined the Chinese People's Liberation Army Naval Song and Dance Troupe.
