= Yang Hongji =

Chinese actor and baritone (born 1941)

- 杨洪基
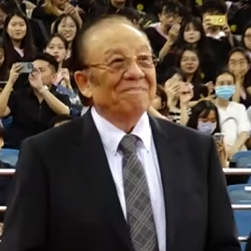
- Yang Hongji in 2023
- Born: February 8, 1941 (age 85); Dalian, Fengtian province, Manchukuo
- Education: People's Liberation Army Academy of Art
- Occupation: Singer
- Years active: 1959–present
- Political party: Chinese Communist Party
- Spouse: Liu Wenmei (m. 1972)
- Children: 1
- Musical career
- Genre: Military song

Chinese name
- Traditional Chinese: 楊洪基
- Simplified Chinese: 杨洪基
Transcriptions
Standard Mandarin
- Hanyu Pinyin: Yáng Hóngjī

Yang Hongji (Chinese: 杨洪基; born 8 February 1941) is a Chinese national-level actor and one of China's most celebrated baritones. He is also a professor at the People's Liberation Army Academy of Art. He holds the rank of Major General (Shaojiang).

== Early life and education ==
Yang was born in Dalian, Fengtian province (now Liaoning), Manchukuo, on February 8, 1941, while his ancestral home in Rongcheng, Shandong. After the founding of the People's Republic of China in 1959, he was accepted to the Opera House of Dalian Song and Dance Troupe. In 1962, he entered the Central Military Commission Political Work Department Song and Dance Troupe, where he studied under Li Mengxiong, Yang Huatang and Shen Xiang. He joined the Chinese Communist Party in June 1979.

== Career ==
In 1994, he sang the theme song of the 1994 historical television series Romance of the Three Kingdoms, adapted from Luo Guanzhong's classical novel of the same title.

In 1995, he sang a song titled "Sleepless Tonight" at the CCTV New Year's Gala.

He provided one of the two vocals for the song "Where Lies the Path Ahead?" (敢问路在何方) in the 2024 video game Black Myth: Wukong.
