= Zhang Ye =

Zhang Ye may refer to:

- Zhang Ye (Later Shu) (died 948), Later Shu official and general
- Zhang Ye (singer) (born 1968), Chinese singer
- Zhang Ye (footballer, born 1987), Chinese football midfielder

== See also ==
- Zhangye, a prefecture-level city in Gansu, China
