= Central Military Commission Political Work Department Song and Dance Troupe =

Chinese military art troupe

- 中央军委政治工作部歌舞团
- Formation: 1953; 73 years ago
- Founded at: Beijing, China
- Type: State-run
- Headquarters: Haidian District, Beijing, China
- Official language: Mandarin Chinese
- Owner: Central Military Commission
- Chairman: Li Yuning (李玉宁)
- Key people: Peng Liyuan, Yan Weiwen, Yu Junjian, Mao Amin, Dong Wenhua, Tan Jing, Kareem, Yang Hongji, Dai Yuqiang, Huang Hong
- Formerly called: Chinese People's Liberation Army General Political Department Song and Dance Troupe

The Central Military Commission Political Work Department Song and Dance Troupe (simplified Chinese: 中央军委政治工作部歌舞团; traditional Chinese: 中央軍事委員會政治工作部歌舞團; pinyin: Zhōngyāngjūnweǐ Zhèngzhì Gōngzuóbù Gēwǔtuán), formerly known as Chinese People's Liberation Army General Political Department Song and Dance Troupe (simplified Chinese: 中国人民解放军总政治部歌舞团; traditional Chinese: 中國人民解放軍總政治部歌舞團; pinyin: Zhōngguó Rénmín Jiěfàngjūn Zǒngzhèngzhìbù Gēwǔtuán), is the official army choir of the Central Military Commission. Founded during the Chinese Civil War, the troupe consists of a song and dance ensemble, an opera troupe, and a repertory theatre.

The Central Military Commission Political Department Song and Dance Troupe has entertained audiences both in China and throughout the world, performing a range of music including military songs, guoyue, popular music, stage play, traditional Chinese opera, xiangsheng, and sketch comedy. It is a directly reporting unit of the Political Work Department of the CMC, and is organized into:

- Symphony Orchestra, including specialized sections and instrumental ensembles
- Mixed Chorus
- Men's and Women's Choirs, including specialized sections
- Traditional Chinese symphony orchestra, occasionally combined with the symphonic orchestra
- Opera ensembles (Traditional Chinese opera and Western)
- Pop and Rock band
- Repertory Theater of the PLA

In 2016, as part of the Xi Jinping's restructuring of the PLA, many of the performance troupes under the PWD-CMC were also restructured or simply disbanded altogether.

== Composition ==
These past and present artists and musicians worked as part of the central SDT:

- Playwrights: Dong Xiaowu, Hu Guogang, Zhu Donglin, Zhang Wenming, Jiang Huaxun, Liu Ying, Yu Zengxiang, Sun Jiabao, Zuo Qing, Zhang Jigang, Sun Yupeng, and Ma Yongmu
- Songwriters: Wei Feng, Chen Kezheng, Li Yourong, Gao Jun, Qu Cong, He Dongjiu, and Zhao Daming.
- Composers: Shi Lemeng, Meng Guibin, Yan Ke, Lu Zulong, Fu Gengchen, Xu Xiyi, Zhang Naicheng, Shi Xin, Meng Xianbin, Ding Xiaoli, Zhang Zhuoya, Wang Zujie, Guo Hongjun, Yin Qing, and Liu Qing
- Conductors: Hu Defeng, Xu Xin, Liu Yunhou, and Zheng Jian.
- Singers: Peng Liyuan, Phoenix Legend, Li Shuangjiang, Yan Weiwen, Dong Wenhua, Yu Junjian, Mao Amin, Cai Guoqing, Bai Xue, Ma Ziyu, Xu Youguang, Kou Jialun, Su Shenglan, Ke Limu, Cheng Zhi, Wang Xiufen, Xiong Qingcai, Tan Jing, Wang Hongwei, Liu Xiaona, Zhong Liyan, Zu Hai, Wang Lida, Lei Jia, Wu Na, Wang Qingshuang, Alu Azhuo, Zhao Xin, Jin Tingting, Tang Zixing, Meng Ge, Yang Hongji, Dai Yuqiang, Feng Ruili, Suolang Wangmu, Ding Xiaohong, Pang Long, Ji Minjia, Lü Jihong, Chen Hong, Sha Yi, Chen Lili, Chang Sisi, Bai Zhiyao, and Chen Sisi
- Dancers: Zhou Guixin, Shen Peiyi, Li Qingming, Liu Min, Huang Qicheng, and Qiu Hui
- Xiangsheng performer: Huang Hong, Pan Changjiang, Pan Yang, Guo Da, Liu Yajing, Niu Li, Chang Baohua, and Chang Guitian
