= You Hongfei =

Chinese soprano singer

You Hongfei (Chinese: 尤泓斐) is a soprano at the China National Opera and a National A-class Performer of China (国家一级演员).

You was born in Hulan District in Harbin, the capital of Heilongjiang province. She graduated from the Department of Opera of China Conservatory of Music in 1996 and joined China National Opera as an opera singer. She is a member of the council of Chinese Musicians' Association and a member of Ministry of Culture of the People's Republic of China Youth Federation. Awarded 'Honorable artist' by the Peking University Hall and named one of China's Top 10 Sopranos by CCTV China Central Television Music Channel. A visiting professor at Harbin Conservatory of Music.

== Opera career ==
Opera name	Composer/producer	Role	Note
La Traviata	Giuseppe Verdi	Violetta Valery	
Il Trovatore	Giuseppe Verdi	Leonora	
Candide	Leonard Bernstein	Cunégonde	
La bohème	Giacomo Puccini	Musetta	
Arshin Mal Alan (operetta)	Uzeyir Hajibeyov	Gulchohre	
Yu Niang(羽娘)	ShenYang Military Region Marching Song and Dance Troupe	Yu Niang	
The Banquet	Guo Wenjing	Hong Zhu	Was invited to premiere at Paris Autumn International Art Festival
A Madman's Diary	Guo Wenjing	Cun Gu	
Du Shiniang	China National Opera House	Du Shiniang	First original opera composed and produced by China National Opera House in 10 years
The Legend of Wood Carving	Minzu University of China	Na La	
Wang Fu Yun	Zheng Lücheng	A Xin	
Second Farewell to Cambridge(再别康桥)		Lin Huiyin	
The White Haired Girl(白毛女)	Yan Jinxuan	Xi Er	
Searching(一路寻找)	Armed Police Art Troupe	Zhao Yin	
Sorrowful Dawn(悲怆的黎明)	Chen Gang	Lin Hai	
The Chronicles of Xinghai(辛亥风云)	Wang Huquan	A Lian	
My Mother is Taihang(我的母亲叫太行)	Wang Huquan	Shi Chunlan	
Hero Lanhui(北川兰辉)	Li Dandan	Lanhui's Wife	

During the pursuit of her career, You gave special attention to the performance of original Chinese operas.

== Concerts and other performances ==
Year	Concert
2006	'Let me be near you' Beijing Solo Concert
2007	'Let me be near you' Shenzhen Solo Concert
2008	'Wan Zhuang in Blue' Beijing Music Gathering
2012	'From The White Haired Girl to La Traviata' Harbin Solo Concert
2017	'Foreign Classic Songs and Operas' Harbin Solo Concert

You co-performed concerts with China National Symphony Orchestra, China Philharmonic Orchestra, Beijing Symphony Orchestra, Shanghai Philharmonic Orchestra, China National Opera House Symphony Orchestra, China National Opera & Dance Theater Symphony Orchestra, Beijing Film Philharmonic and German Modern Orchestra, etc.

You Hongfei was a featured guest singer at José Carreras 's Beijing Solo concert. She was the leading soprano inSymphony No. 9 (Beethoven) and Requiem (Mozart) in the concert with China National Symphony Orchestra. She performed with Jean-Michel Jarre inside the Forbidden City and attended the opening ceremony of Les Années Chine-France, which was broadcast to over 2.5 billion viewers worldwide. She has performed in countries and regions around the world including France, Germany, Australia, North Korea, Laos, Macau, Hong Kong and Taiwan, etc. She also made appearances in domestic galas held by Chinese government and organizations, among which include the CCTV New Year's Gala.

== Awards ==
Year	Award	Event
1999	Individual Singing Award	Pyongyang International Art Festival
2000	Second Prize	China National Art Song Competition
2004	Individual Singing Award	Pyongyang International Art Festival
2005	First prize	Ministry of Culture of the People's Republic of China Youth Performers Assessment
2008	Best Female Bel Canto Award	China Golden Album
2011	Outstanding Performing Award	Outstanding Piece Performance
