= Wang Yuewen =

Chinese author

Wang Yuewen (Chinese: 王跃文; pinyin: Wáng Yuèwén; born 1962) is a contemporary Chinese writer known for his popular novels in the anti-corruption genre. His 1999 novel, National Portrait (國畫), about municipal-level corruption in China became a sensation, spawning a craze in the genre. The novel received critical acclaim, despite being effectively banned by the government and only printing 105,000 copies. In 2013, he won the Lu Xun Literary Prize for his novella Spreading Water (漫水).

A native of Huaihua, Hunan, Wang grew up in the countryside and attended Huaihua University when he was nineteen. Before becoming a full-time writer, Wang was a municipal and country-level civil servant in west Hunan, serving in the Xupu country government from 1984 to 1992. He transferred to Changsha around 1994 and later worked in the Hunan provincial government when he began writing in earnest in the late 1990s. His other popular works include Premier of the Qing Dynasty (大清相国), an anti-corruption themed novel focusing on the life of Qing dynasty politician, Chen Tingjing. The novel was endorsed by Wang Qishan, Vice President of the People's Republic of China, and adapted into a play in 2017. A TV adaptation of the novel written by Wang and directed by Zheng Xiaolong is currently in production.

== Works in translation ==
- Home Village

== See also ==
- Zhou Meisen
