= Chen Lin (singer) =

Chinese Mandopop singer

- Born: 31 January 1970; Fengjie County, Chongqing, China
- Died: 31 October 2009 (aged 39); Beijing, China
- Occupation: Singer
- Years active: 1993–2009

Chinese name
- Traditional Chinese: 陳琳
- Simplified Chinese: 陈琳
Transcriptions
Standard Mandarin
- Hanyu Pinyin: Chén Lín
- Musical career
- Genres: Mandopop

Chen Lin (31 January 1970 – 31 October 2009) was a Chinese Mandopop singer. She died by suicide at the age of 39.

== Career ==
She rose to stardom with her 1993 album entitled I Can Never Understand Your Love (in Mandarin 你的柔情我永远不懂). It reached the top of the Chinese album charts, selling 1.5 million copies. She ended up releasing 7 albums.

== Personal life ==
In 1995, she married the singer Shen Yongge, founder of Zhu Shu Entertainment Ltd., a record company. He helped her with releasing three albums that defined the peak of her career in 2000. Shen and Chen were a popular celebrity couple until divorcing in 2007. Her second marriage was to singer and producer Zhang Chaofeng in July 2009, and soon after in August 2009 Chen Lin released her last EP. Friends said she was plagued with emotional problems leading up to her suicide in October 2009.

== Death ==
Three months after her second marriage, she died by suicide on 31 October 2009 by jumping from an apartment building in the Olympic Garden community in Chaoyang District, in Beijing. It was reported that some of Chen's friends said the singer was traumatized about the failure of her first marriage to Shen Yongge and picked his birthday to die by suicide.

== Discography ==
=== Albums ===
(approximate translations of titles in parentheses)

- 你的柔情我永远不懂 (I can never understand your love) (1993)
- 害怕爱上你 (Afraid of falling in Love with you) (1996)
- 女人 (Woman) (1997)
- 陈琳 (Chen Lin) (2000)
- 爱就爱了 Love is Love (2001)
- 不想骗自己 (Don't want to lie to myself) (2003)
- 13131 (2005)

=== Singles ===
(Selective list. Approximate translations of titles in parentheses)

- 你的柔情我永远不懂 ("I can never understand your love")
- 害怕爱上你 ("Afraid to Fall in Love with You")
- 两个人的世界 ("The World of Two People")
- 雨夜 ("Rainy Night")
- 十二种颜色 ("Twelve Colors")
- 不想骗自己 ("Don't want to lie to myself")
- 爱就爱了 ("Love Is Love")
- 抱紧我别走 ("Hold Me Close and Don't Go")
- 天使的选择 ("Angel's Choice")
- 当爱已错时 ("When Love Is Wrong")

Awards and achievements
Top Chinese Music Chart Awards
Preceded by Tian Zhen	Best Female Artist, mainland China; 2002	Succeeded by Na Ying
