= Xi Nanhua =

Chinese mathematician

- 席南华
- Born: March 1963 (age 63); Yingde, Guangdong, China
- Education: Huaihua University (BS); East China Normal University (MS, PhD)
- Scientific career
- Fields: Mathematics
- Institutions: Institute of Mathematics and Systems Sciences, Chinese Academy of Sciences; University of Chinese Academy of Sciences

Chinese name
- Traditional Chinese: 席南華
- Simplified Chinese: 席南华
Transcriptions
Standard Mandarin
- Hanyu Pinyin: Xí Nánhuá

Xi Nanhua (Chinese: 席南华; born March 1963) is a Chinese mathematician currently serving as President of the Institute of Mathematics and Systems Sciences, Chinese Academy of Sciences and Dean of the College of Mathematics, University of Chinese Academy of Sciences.

== Biography ==
Xi was born in Yingde, Guangdong in March 1963, while his ancestral home is in Qidong County, Hunan. After the resumption of college entrance examination, he graduated from Huaihua University. In 1982 he entered East China Normal University, where he earned his master's degree and Ph.D. in mathematics. He conducted post-doctoral research at the Institute of Mathematics, Chinese Academy of Sciences (CAS). He was elected an academician of the CAS in 2009. He was vice president of the University of Chinese Academy of Sciences between 2014 and 2017. He is now President of the CAS Institute of Mathematics and Systems Sciences and Dean of the College of Mathematics, University of the Chinese Academy of Sciences.

== Awards ==
- 2001, Morningside Medal (Silver)
- 2005, 10th Chen Xingshen Mathematics Award
- 2007, Second Prize of the State Natural Science Award
