= Murder of Zhang Miao =

2010 intentional homicide case in China

On 20 October 2010, 26-year-old Zhang Miao (Chinese: 张妙) was murdered by 21-year-old Yao Jiaxin (药家鑫) in Xi'an, Shaanxi Province, China. Yao fatally stabbed Zhang after injuring her in a traffic collision, out of fear that Zhang might seek financial compensation for the initial accident. Yao injured another two people in a hit and run while fleeing the scene.

Yao was tried for Zhang's murder on 23 March 2011, sentenced to death on 22 April 2011, and executed on 7 June 2011. The case was compared to the earlier Li Gang incident, which occurred four days earlier, causing outrage over alleged preferential treatment of fuerdai in the legal system. Later coverage discussed whether the death penalty was appropriate and the effect negative social media reports had on Yao's trial.

== Summary ==
On the night of 20 October 2010, cafe waitress Zhang Miao was riding her bicycle when she was struck by the car of Yao Jiaxin, a pianist studying at Xi'an Conservatory of Music. Zhang sustained minor injuries. When Yao got out of the car, he found Zhang trying to memorize his licence plate number. As he was afraid that Zhang would get him in trouble or ask for compensation over this accident, he took out a knife and stabbed her eight times in the chest and stomach, killing her. When he was trying to escape, he hit two other people on the road and was eventually apprehended. However, the police released him because of lack of evidence. The police did not manage to properly connect the two accidents and charge him with murder until 22 October. Yao confessed on 23 October, saying that he thought Zhang, whom he called a "peasant woman", would have likely not been dissuaded from seeking legal action against him.

Yao was put on trial on 23 March 2011, at the Xi’an Intermediate People's Court. Since he had shown remorse for the murder, it was quite likely that he would escape the death penalty. However, after this case was exposed by the media and discussed heatedly on the internet, most netizens demanded Yao receive the death penalty. A background check into Yao's background by participants of the human flesh search engine revealed that Yao's father was a well-placed military representative in Xi’an, which added to popular resentment of him.

On the other hand, a crime psychologist, Li Meijin, made controversial comments on the case in an interview on China Central Television, which were also maligned by netizens. She posited that Yao's behavior in stabbing the woman eight times was related to his miserable experience of playing piano during his childhood. ‘His behavior of stabbing the victim eight times could have been a mechanical repetition of him hitting the piano keys’, said Li. However, she was seen as an unabashed apologist for Yao. Netizens called her the 'defender of a murderer' and also launched a human flesh search engine to discredit her. Many people also thought that the state media coverage of the case was biased, as it covered only the murderer without any empathy for the victim.

== Discussion ==
=== The education system ===
During the trial, Yao's lawyer pleaded for leniency by saying Yao was a 'model student', with many awards for academic excellence.

This was very ironic and led to heated discussion over the Chinese education system. While most parents only care about children's grades, they care less about their character and moral compass. Such a rigid education deprives children of their natural development and makes them indifferent about life.

=== Abolition of death penalty ===
There was a heated debate on the internet by many public figures about whether capital punishment in China should be abolished. The debate was triggered by the murder case of Yao. According to an online Yahoo survey about whether Yao should get the death penalty, 96.5% (10,710 out of 11,100) of the respondents said that he should. One of the reasons for the widespread public outrage towards Yao is that they were afraid that China would be controlled by jungle law.

== Result of trial and responses ==
Yao was found guilty by the Xi'an Intermediate People's Court, and sentenced to death on 22 April 2011. He appealed the court's decision to the Shaanxi Provincial Higher People's Court, which rejected his appeal on 20 May. The Supreme People's Court reviewed the case and upheld the death sentence, concluded that the first and second trials were without error. 'The motive was extremely despicable, the measures extremely cruel and the consequences extremely serious,' said the SPC. Yao was executed on 7 June 2011. Authorities in China rarely specify the method of execution used; Yao was probably executed by lethal injection.

Public reaction towards the execution varied on the internet. Some claimed that it was a victory for public action over the privileged class, while others considered Yao a victim of cyberstalking/online mobs.
