= Fanny Hodges Newman =

American poet and lyricist (1862–1946)

Fanny Hodges Newman (1862 – 1946) was an American poet and lyricist. Originally from Michigan, she married the gynecologist Henry P. Newman in Chicago in 1882 and had two children with him. In 1906, the family moved to California. Fanny published three volumes of verse: Adventures (1910), Out of Bondage (1913), and Hearts Allied (1917). She also wrote the lyrics to "We Are All Americans" (1918).
