= The Hearse Song =

Children's song popularized during WWI

"The Hearse Song" is a song about burial and human decomposition, of unknown origin. It was popular as a World War I song, and was popular in the 20th century as an American and British children's song, continuing to the present. It has many variant titles, lyrics, and melodies, but generally features the line "The worms crawl in, the worms crawl out," and thus is also known as "The Worms Crawl In." Generally, the song recounts the viewing of a hearse, prompting the thought of death. The listener's body is buried in a casket and assaulted by worms, then decomposes; some versions continue by stating the dead listener will be forced to eat their moldering remains.

== History ==
The earliest version of the verse is found in a poem by the English writer Matthew Lewis, incorporated in his popular 1796 Gothic novel The Monk, which includes the lines, "The worms they crept in, and the worms they crept out and sported his eyes and his temples about." While there are reports of the song dating back to British soldiers in the Crimean War (1853–1856), it certainly dates to at least World War I (1914–1918), when it was sung by American and British soldiers, and was collected in various World War I songbooks of the 1920s.

The key line, "The worms crawl in, the worms crawl out" appears in some versions of the otherwise unrelated song, There Was a Lady All Skin and Bone, and may date to 1810 or earlier.

== Example lyrics ==
"The Hearse Song" is a piece of folklore with an unusually large number of variants, created over several generations. Carl Sandburg, in his 1927 book American Songbag, printed two early variations, the first being:

The Old Grey Hearse goes rolling by,
You don't know whether to laugh or cry;
For you know some day it'll get you too,
And the hearse's next load may consist of—you.

They'll take you out and they'll lower you down,
While men with shovels stand all a-round;
They'll throw in dirt and they'll throw in rocks,
And they won't give a dam-m-n if they break the box.

The worms crawl in and the worms crawl out,
They crawl all over your chin and mouth.
They invite their friends and their friends' friends too,
And you look like hell when they're—through—with you.

== Sources ==
- Abernethy, Francis Edward, ed. (1976). What's Going On? (In Modern Texas Folklore). Publications of the Texas Folklore Society. Vol. 40. University of North Texas Press. ISBN 978-1-57441-058-7. Archived from the original on 2023-06-05.
- Doyle, Charles Clay (1976). "'As the Hearse Goes By': The Modern Child's Memento Mori". What's Going On? (In Modern Texas Folklore). pp. 175–190.
- Pankake, Marcia; Pankake, Jon (1988). A Prairie Home Companion Folk Song Book: More Than 300 Fresh, Funny, and Irreverent American Folk Songs. Viking Adult. p. 124. ISBN 978-0-670-82159-4.
- Waltz, Robert B.; Engle, David G. (2023). "Worms Crawl In, The". balladindex.org.
