= Huaihua University =

Public college in Huaihua, Hunan, China

- 怀化学院
- Motto: 厚德博学，唯实求新
- Type: Public college
- Established: 1958; 68 years ago
- President: Song Kehui (宋克慧)
- Academic staff: 867 (2019)
- Students: 18,057 (2019)
- Location: Huaihua, Hunan, China; 27°34′34″N 110°01′23″E
- Campus: 164.736921 acres (0.66666667 km^{2})
- Website: www.hhtc.edu.cn

Chinese name
- Simplified Chinese: 怀化学院
- Traditional Chinese: 懷化學院
Transcriptions
Standard Mandarin
- Hanyu Pinyin: Huáihuà Xuéyuàn

Huaihua University (Chinese: 怀化学院; lit. 'Huaihua College') is a provincial public college in Huaihua, Hunan, China.

As of fall 2019, the university has 2 campuses, a combined student body of 18,057 students, 867 faculty members. The university consists of 21 departments, with 49 specialties for undergraduates. At present, the university has 6 research institutions and research centres.

== History ==
Huaihua University was formed in 1958, it was initially called "Qianyang Normal College". It was renamed "Huaihua Normal College" in 1983. In 1986, Huaihua Continuing Education College merged into the university.

== Academics ==
- Department of Politics and Law
- Department of Economics
- Department of Education Science
- Department of Physical
- Department of Chinese Language and Literature
- Department of Foreign Languages and Literature
- Department of Foreign Travel
- Department of Mathematics and Applied Mathematics
- Department of Life Science
- Department of Music
- Department of Art
- Department of Artistic Designing
- Department of Computer Science and Technology
- Department of Business
- Department of English
- Department of Physical Science and Information Engineering

== Library collections ==
Huaihua University's total collection amounts to more than 1.48 million items.

== Culture ==
- Motto: Honest, Erudite, Realistic, Innovative (厚德博学、唯实求新)
- College newspaper: Huaihua University Newspaper (怀化学院报)

== People ==
=== Notable alumni ===
- Xi Nanhua, member of the Chinese Academy of Sciences (CAS).
- Wang Yuewen, writer.
- Tayo Elvis Nkengafeh, Former Teacher.
- Chen Sisi, singer.
- Jia Zongchao, professor at Queen's University.
- Mo Wenxiu, Secretary of All-China Women's Federation.
- Wang Zhuojuan, musician.
- Chen Zhiqiang, Mayor of Huaihua.
