= Li Tianyi =

Chinese criminal

- 李天一
- Born: April 25, 1996 (age 28); Beijing, China
- Education: High School Affiliated to Renmin University of China; Shattuck-Saint Mary's
- Parent(s): Li Shuangjiang; Meng Ge

Chinese name
- Chinese: 李天一
Transcriptions
Standard Mandarin
- Hanyu Pinyin: Lǐ Tiānyī

Li Guanfeng
- Traditional Chinese: 李冠豐
- Simplified Chinese: 李冠丰
Transcriptions
Standard Mandarin
- Hanyu Pinyin: Lǐ Guànfēng

Li Tianyi (Chinese: 李天一; pinyin: Lǐ Tiānyī; born April 1996) is the son of Chinese singers Li Shuangjiang and Meng Ge. He became famous after he was accused (and later convicted) of leading a gang rape in 2013, and was watched closely in China as an example of the treatment accorded to members of the elite.

== Personal life ==
Li Tianyi was born in Beijing in 1996. His father Li Shuangjiang and mother Meng Ge are both famous singers.

Li attended Zhongguancun Third Primary School and the High School Affiliated to Renmin University of China. Later, he went to the United States and attended Shattuck-Saint Mary's in Faribault, Minnesota.

Li studied piano under Han Jianming (韩剑明), a professor at the Central Conservatory of Music, beginning when he was four years old. Li began to learn calligraphy under Fang Zhiwen (方志文), a professor at Tsinghua University, when he was eight years old. In 2006, he joined the Chinese youth ice hockey team.

== Convictions ==
In 2011, Li Tianyi assaulted a middle-aged couple over a traffic dispute and threatened witnesses. He was driving a BMW with no license plates at the time. As a result, he was sentenced to a year in detention, and his father issued a public apology.

In July 2013, Li, then aged 17, was arrested on charges of taking part in a gang-rape of a woman in a Beijing hotel together with four others. The trial of the five defendants began in late August 2013. Li denied having sex with the woman, who he said was a prostitute. On 26 September 2013, a Chinese court convicted Li and sentenced him to 10 years in prison. The court characterized the sentence as lenient because he was a juvenile offender, even though he was the ringleader of the gang.
