= Li Shuangjiang =

Chinese military singer

Professor Li Shuangjiang
- 李双江
- Born: March 10, 1939 (age 87); Harbin, Heilongjiang, Manchukuo
- Citizenship: Chinese
- Education: Central Conservatory of Music
- Years active: 1963–present
- Political party: Chinese Communist Party
- Spouse(s): Ding Ying (former wife); Meng Ge (current wife)
- Children: Li Tianyi

Chinese name
- Traditional Chinese: 李雙江
- Simplified Chinese: 李双江
Transcriptions
Standard Mandarin
- Hanyu Pinyin: Lǐ Shuāngjiāng

Li Shuangjiang (Chinese: 李双江; born 10 March 1939) is a Chinese military singer, and is considered one of the best tenors in China.

== Biography ==
Li Shuangjiang was born in Harbin, Heilongjiang, Manchukuo in 1939. Li attended the Central Conservatory of Music when he was twenty years old. After graduating from university he was assigned to work in the army song and dance ensemble. At the age of thirty, he joined the Chinese People's Liberation Army Naval Song and Dance Troupe. He made a record that sold three million copies by the age of thirty-two. He is now a professor at Central Conservatory of Music.

== Personal life and family ==
Ding Ying (丁英) was Li's first wife. She was a dancer. They have a son named Li He (李贺).

In 1990, at age fifty-one, Li and Meng Ge, who was more than twenty-seven years his junior, married in Beijing. Meng Ge was his student at Central Conservatory of Music. They have a son named Li Tianyi. Meng Ge is also a well-known military singer.

In 2013, Li was embroiled in controversy as his son Li Tianyi was sentenced to ten years in jail for rape.
