= Tian Zhen =

Chinese rock singer from Beijing (born 1966)

- Born: 2 May 1966 (age 60); Beijing, China
- Education: The Affiliated High School of Peking University
- Occupation: singer-songwriter
- Years active: 1984–present
- Spouse: Zhang Weining
- Musical career
- Genres: Pop, rock, folk

Chinese name
- Chinese: 田震
Transcriptions
Standard Mandarin
- Hanyu Pinyin: Tián Zhèn

Tian Zhen (born 2 May 1966) is a Chinese rock singer from Beijing.

== Early life ==
On May 2, 1966, Tian Zhen was born in Beijing to Dai Li and Tian Zhenhua. Both of her parents were members of the army — her father as a soldier, and her mother as a solo singer. Tian is the youngest of four children, with three elder brothers.

Tian is an alum of The Affiliated High School of Peking University.

== Career ==
She has described Tina Turner as her favorite singer. Unlike her female Chinese vocalist predecessors, she writes and composes her own songs.

Tian is regarded as one of the three greatest female singers of her generation, along with Mao Amin and Na Ying. Tian's hits include Perseverance (执着), Cheers, Mate (干杯，朋友), What a big tree (好大一棵树), The girl from Ali Mountain (阿里山的姑娘), Night Stand (水姻缘), and Roses in the storms and rainbows (风雨彩虹铿锵玫瑰).

== Personal life ==
Tian married her manager Zhang Weining. They have no children.

Tian suffered from thrombocytopenia, a serious blood disease around 2006.

== Discography ==
- 1984 Beautiful Bay (美丽的海湾; Měilì de Hǎiwān)
- 1984 Nameless Little Flower (无名的小花; Wúmíng de Xiǎohuā)
- 1984 Monica (莫尼卡; Mòníkǎ)
- 1995 Perseverance (执着; Zhízhuó)
- 1996 Self-titled Tian Zhen (田震;Tián Zhèn)
- 1997 Let it Be (顺其自然; Shùn qí Zìrán)
- 1998 Cheers, Mate (干杯，朋友; GānBēi PéngYǒu)
- 2000 Shock (震撼; Zhènhàn)
- 2001 Night Stand (水姻缘; Shuǐ yīnyuán)
- 2005 38.5 °C
- 2006 Thanks Tian (干杯，田震; Gānbēi, tiánzhèn)

== Related artists/bands ==
- Cui Jian
- Dou Wei
- Tang Dynasty (band)

Awards and achievements
Top Chinese Music Chart Awards
Preceded by First Year Awarded	Best Female Artist, mainland China; 2001	Succeeded by Chen Lin
