= Liu Min (dancer) =

Chinese military dancer and professor

- 刘敏
- Born: February 1958 (age 68); Hefei, Anhui, China
- Alma mater: Anhui Art School
- Military career
- Allegiance: People's Republic of China
- Branch: People's Liberation Army Ground Force
- Rank: Major general

Chinese name
- Simplified Chinese: 刘敏
- Traditional Chinese: 劉敏
Transcriptions
Standard Mandarin
- Hanyu Pinyin: Liú Mǐn

Liu Min (Chinese: 刘敏; born February 1958), is a Chinese military dancer and professor. She is a member of the People's Liberation Army.

== Biography ==
In February 1958, Liu was born in Hefei, Anhui. After graduating from primary school, she entered Anhui Art School (安徽省艺术学校) and she joined the Chinese People's Liberation Army Naval Song and Dance Troupe. In 1994, Liu went to the United States to study with her husband. In September 1999, Liu was transferred to People's Liberation Army Academy of Art to teach dance.

Liu was a member of the 8th, 9th, 10th National Committees of the Chinese People's Political Consultative Conference.
