= Li Guyi =

Chinese singer and dancer (born 1944)

- 李谷一
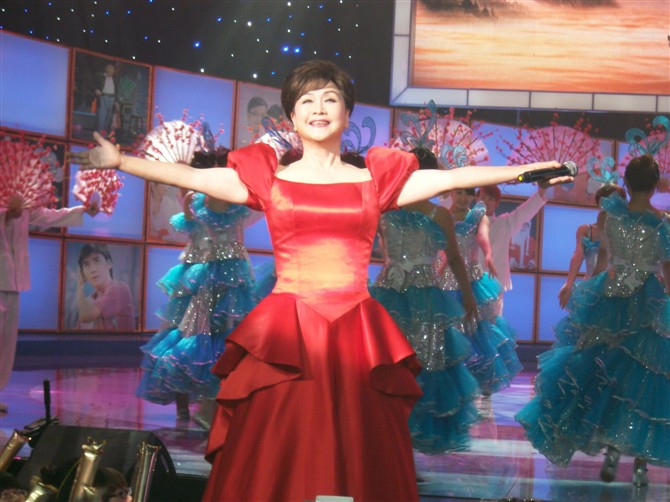
- Li Guyi in May 2012
- Born: 4 November 1944 (age 81); Kunming, Yunnan, China
- Education: Hunan Normal University
- Occupations: Singer, dancer
- Years active: 1970-present
- Spouse(s): Jin Tielin (divorced); Xiao Zhuoneng
- Children: 1
- Musical career
- Genres: Mandopop; Ethnic music

Chinese name
- Traditional Chinese: 李穀一
- Simplified Chinese: 李谷一
Transcriptions
Standard Mandarin
- Hanyu Pinyin: Lǐ Gǔyī

Li Guyi (Chinese: 李谷一; born 4 November 1944) is a Chinese singer and dancer. Li rose to fame after singing Homeland Love (乡恋), a mellow love ballad written by Ma Jinghua and Zhang Peiji, in 1980 shortly after China began its "Reform and Opening".

== Biography ==
Li was born in 1944 in Kunming, Yunnan, at Huidian Hospital (惠滇医院), she graduated from Hunan Art College (now part of Hunan Normal University) in 1961. From 1961 to 1974, Li worked in Hunan Opera Theatre.

In 1970, Li performed Tinker a Pan (补锅). Chinese officials thought she was a revisionist black talent. Officials searched her house, confiscated her property, and she was sentenced to hard labor.

From 1974 to 1984, Li was transferred to Central Philharmonic Orchestra as a solo. Then she has toured with the Central Philharmonic Orchestra to perform in China and abroad, including in France, Japan and the United States.

In 1980, the Chinese officials criticized Li as "mainland China's Teresa Teng" for singing Homeland Love (乡恋), considered the first pop song in mainland China. The song was prohibited for several years.

In 1986, Li worked in Chinese Light Music Group as the head.

In 1996, Li transferred to Central Oriental Song and Dance Troupe as the CPC Party Secretary.

Li is actively involved in politics, and was a member of the 6th, 7th, 8th, and 9th National Committee of the Chinese People's Political Consultative Conference.

On January 6, 2020, she was hired as a member of the Hunan Literature and History Institute.

== Family ==
Li was twice married. Originally wed to musician Jin Tielin. After a turbulent divorce, she remarried in 1976. Xiao Zhuoneng (肖卓能), her second husband, the son of Xiao Jinguang, who was one of the ten senior generals of the People's Liberation Army. The couple has a daughter, Xiao Yi (肖一). Xiao Zhuoneng died on May 29, 2020.
