= Chou Chuan-huing =

Steve Chou
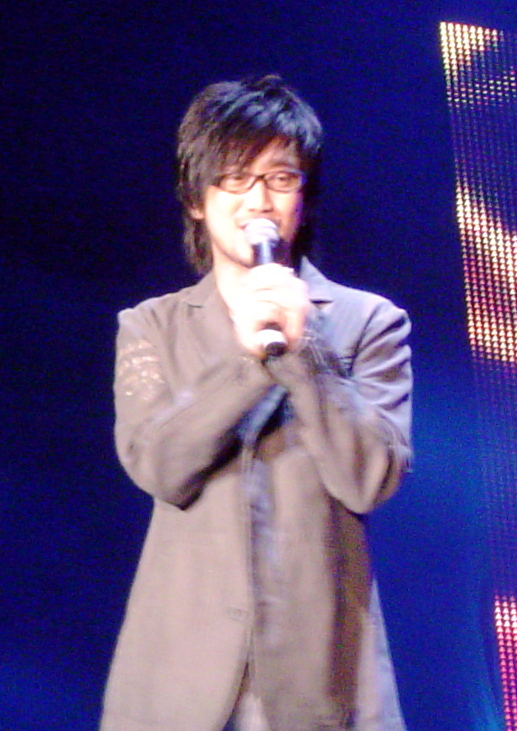
- Chou in 2006
- Born: 7 June 1969 (age 57); Taichung, Taiwan
- Occupation: Singer
- Years active: 1989–present

Chinese name
- Traditional Chinese: 周傳雄
- Simplified Chinese: 周传雄
Transcriptions
Standard Mandarin
- Hanyu Pinyin: Zhōu Chuánxióng
Southern Min
- Hokkien POJ: Chiu Thoân-hiông
- Musical career
- Also known as: 小剛/小刚(Sió-kong) / 情歌教父(Godfather of Love Songs; Pe̍h-ōe-jī: Chêng-koa Kàu-hū)
- Origin: Republic of China (Taiwan)
- Genres: Mandopop
- Instrument: Vocals

Steve Chou (Chinese: 周傳雄; pinyin: Zhōu Chuánxióng; Pe̍h-ōe-jī: Chiu Thoân-hiông) is a Taiwanese composer and singer. He is the youngest of three children, including an older sister and older brother. Their parents abandoned them at an early age, and they were forced to make a living instead of going to school.

Also known as Xiao Gang (he later decided to use his real name when he became a full-time composer), Steve Chou started singing and composing in 1989, and has written a variety of well-known Chinese songs performed by famous singers and himself.

In 2000, his album "Transfer" contained the hit "黃昏"(Dusk), which was his breakthrough song. In 2003, he released another album, "Dubbing 我在身邊" (By Your Side), which included many famous songs he had previously written, as well as new material. His 2004 album "Mixing 男人海洋" (Man. Ocean) wasn't less warmly received. His next album, "星空下的傳說" (The Legend Underneath the Starry Sky), came out in 2005 and contained the song "寂寞沙洲冷"(Cold and Lonely Desert), which won many music awards.

In 2010, a new digital single "苦情歌" (Sad Song) already charted as of early November.

Chou Chuan-huing [Timeless] 2016 World Tour in Shanghai was held at Mercedes-Benz Arena (Shanghai Expo Culture Center) on June 11, 2016.

He appeared as a contestant on the Chinese singing show, Masked Singer in 2017. He announced his return to the music industry following a stomach infection and dramatic weight loss.

In 2021, Chou took part in the second season of The Treasured Voice and was one of the show's main music partners. He sang a song that he composed, that was performed by the Taiwanese group 5566 for the drama "My MVP Valentine" (2002). There was an uproar online regarding a much younger mentor who was going to be his "judge".

== Released albums ==
- 1989.12 -「無名小卒」
- 1990 -「雙子星的對話」
- 1990.12 -「終於學會」
- 1991.08 -「捨不得你走」
- 1992.04 -「小剛的花花世界」
- 1993.03 -「陪著我一直到世界的盡頭」
- 1994.03 -「發覺」
- 1995.04 -「二分之一的愛情」
- 1996.01 -「心出發」
- 1997.01 -「我的心太亂」
- 2000.12.28 -「Transfer」
- 2001.01 -「周傳雄音樂記事本」
- 2003.10.07 -「Dubbing – 我在身邊」
- 2004.01 -「給你的歌」
- 2004.09 -「我在身邊」
- 2004.11.12 -「MIXING – 男人·海洋」
- 2005.06.29 -「星空下的傳說」
- 2006.06.16 -「快樂練習曲」
- 2006.12 -「七夕演唱會 – 愛,無所不在」
- 2007.10.25 -「藍色土耳其」
- 2009.04.07 -「戀人創世紀」
- 2011.04.23 -「微涼的記憶 Peu De Mémoire」
- 2012.10.12 -「打擾愛情」
- 2014.11.11 -「時不知歸」
- 2022.9.14 -「念念不忘」
- 2024.12.15 -「情人該有的慈悲」
