= Stephen Maxym =

American musician (1915–2002)

Stephen Maxym (July 17, 1915 – October 12, 2002) was an American bassoonist and music educator.

Born in New York City, United States, Maxym attended Stuyvesant High School and later studied at the Juilliard School of Music. At the age of 21, he began his professional orchestral career as solo bassoonist with the Pittsburgh Symphony Orchestra. In 1940, he joined the Metropolitan Opera Orchestra, where he served as solo bassoonist until his retirement in 1976.

During his tenure at the Metropolitan Opera, Maxym performed under many prominent conductors of the 20th century, including Herbert von Karajan, Leonard Bernstein, and Erich Leinsdorf. In addition to his orchestral career, he was active as a recording artist, making recordings for RCA Victor and Columbia Records.

Maxym was also widely recognized as a teacher of bassoon and chamber music. He served on the faculties of the Juilliard School, the Manhattan School of Music, the Yale School of Music, the New England Conservatory, the Hartt School of Music, and the University of Southern California, and taught at the Banff Centre for Arts and Creativity. His influence extended internationally through masterclasses and pedagogy, and his teaching formed the basis of later academic work on bassoon performance practice.

In 2001, Maxym was honored by the International Double Reed Society for his lifetime contributions to bassoon performance and education. He died on October 12, 2002, in Laguna Woods, California.
