= Richmond Is a Hard Road to Travel =

American Civil War song

"Richmond Is a Hard Road to Travel" is a well-known Confederate song of the American Civil War, based on the song "Jordan is a Hard Road to Travel" by Daniel Decatur Emmett. It was popular with the Confederate troops in the East, as it made fun of Union commanders in the first two years of the war. The song was penned by the editor of the Southern Literary Messenger, John Reuben Thompson, in 1863.

Each stanza mentions a separate campaign, starting with First Battle of Bull Run, the Valley Campaign, the Battle of Drewry's Bluff, the Peninsula Campaign, the Battle of Cedar Mountain, the Second Battle of Bull Run, and the Battle of Fredericksburg.

== Lyrics ==
Would you like to hear my song? I'm afraid it's rather long
Of the famous "On to Richmond" double trouble,
Of the half-a-dozen trips and half-a-dozen slips
And the very latest bursting of the bubble.
'Tis pretty hard to sing and like a round, round ring
'Tis a dreadful knotty puzzle to unravel;
Though all the papers swore, when we touched Virginia's shore
That Richmond was a hard road to travel.

Then pull off your coat and roll up your sleeve,
Richmond is a hard road to travel
Then pull off your coat and roll up your sleeve
Richmond is a hard road to travel, I believe.

First, McDowell, bold and gay, set forth the shortest way,
By Manassas in the pleasant summer weather,
But unfortunately ran on a Stonewall, foolish man,
And had a "rocky journey" altogether;
And he found it rather hard to ride o'er Beauregard,
And Johnston proved a deuce of a bother,
And 'twas clear beyond a doubt that he didn't like the route,
And a second time would have to try another.

Then pull off your coat and roll up your sleeve,
For Manassas is a hard road to travel;
Manassas gave us fits, and Bull Run made us grieve,
For Richmond is a hard road to travel, I believe!

Next came the Wooly-Horse, with an overwhelming force,
To march down to Richmond by the Valley,
But he couldn't find the road, and his "onward movement" showed
His campaigning was a mere shilly-shally.
Then Commissary Banks, with his motley foreign ranks,
Kicking up a great noise, fuss, and flurry,
Lost the whole of his supplies, and with tears in his eyes,
From the Stonewall ran away in a hurry

Then pull off your coat and roll up your sleeve,
For the Valley is a hard road to travel;
The Valley wouldn't do and we all had to leave,
For Richmond is a hard road to travel, I believe!

Then the great Galena came, with her portholes all aflame,
And the Monitor, that famous naval wonder,
But the guns at Drewry's Bluff gave them speedily enough,
The loudest sort of reg'lar Rebel thunder.
The Galena was astonished and the Monitor admonished,
Our patent shot and shell were mocked at,
While the dreadful Naugatuck, by the hardest kind of luck,
Was knocked into an ugly cocked hat.

Then pull off your coat and roll up your sleeve,
For James River is a hard road to travel;
The gun-boats gave it up in terror and despair,
For Richmond is a hard road to travel, I declare!

Then McClellan followed soon, both with spade and balloon,
To try the Peninsular approaches,
But one and all agreed that his best rate of speed
Was no faster than the slowest of "slow coaches."
Instead of easy ground, at Williamsburg, he found,
A Longstreet indeed, and nothing shorter,
And it put him in the dumps, that spades wasn't trumps,
And the Hills he couldn't level as ordered.

Then pull off your coat and roll up your sleeve
For Longstreet is a hard road to travel -
Lay down the shovel, and throw away the spade
For Richmond is a hard road to travel, I'm afraid!

Then said Lincoln unto Pope,
"You can make the trip, I hope,
I will save the Universal Yankee nation,
To make sure of no defeat, I'll leave no lines of retreat,
And issue a famous proclamation."
But that same dreaded Jackson, this fellow laid his whacks,
And made him, by compulsion, a seceder
And Pope took rapid flight from Manassas' second fight,
'Twas his very last appearance as a leader.

Then pull off your coat and roll up your sleeve,
For Stonewall is a hard road to travel;
Pope did his very best, but was evidently sold,
For Richmond is a hard road to travel, I am told!

Last of all the brave Burnside, with his pontoon bridges, tried
A road no one had thought of before him,
With two hundred thousand men for the Rebel slaughter pen,
And the blessed Union flag waving o'er him;
But he met a fire like hell, of canister and shell,
That mowed his men down with great slaughter,
'Twas a shocking sight to view, that second Waterloo,
And the river ran with more blood than water.

Then pull off your coat and roll up your sleeve,
Rappahannock is a hard road to travel
Burnside got in a trap, which caused him for to grieve
For Richmond is a hard road to travel, I believe!

We are very much perplexed to know who is the next
To command the new Richmond expedition,
For the Capital must blaze, and that in ninety days,
And Jeff and his men be sent to perdition.
We'll take the cursed town, and then we'll burn it down,
And plunder and hang up each cursed Rebel;
Yet the contraband was right when he told us they would fight
"Oh, yes, massa, they fight like the devil!"

Then pull off your coat and roll up your sleeve,
For Richmond is a hard road to travel;
Then pull off your coat and roll up your sleeve,
For Richmond is a hard road to travel, I believe!
