= Yan Weiwen =

- 阎维文
- Born: August 1957 (age 67); Pingyao County, Shanxi, China
- Occupation: Singer
- Years active: 1980–present
- Musical career
- Genres: Ethnic music, military song

Chinese name
- Traditional Chinese: 閻維文
- Simplified Chinese: 阎维文
Transcriptions
Standard Mandarin
- Hanyu Pinyin: Yán Weíwén

Yan Weiwen (Chinese: 阎维文; born August 1957) is a contemporary Chinese opera singer with origins in the People's Liberation Army. He rose to fame through this involvement in the performing arts troupe of the PLA's General Political Department.

Yan has four signature works: The Little Poplar Tree (小白杨), Mother (母亲), Words From My Heart (说句心里话), and The 1-2-3-4 Song (一二三四歌). Yan has performed all four songs on the annual CCTV New Year's Gala, to critical acclaim.

== Biography ==
Yan was born in Pingyao County, Shanxi in 1957 (some sources say he was born in Taiyuan). Yan entered Shanxi Song and Dance Troupe when he was 13. At age 15, he joined the Chinese People's Liberation Army. He studied music under Zhang Xiao, Wei Jinrong, Jin Tielin and Cheng Zhi.

== Personal life ==
Yan has a daughter named Yan Jingjing (阎晶晶).

== Filmography ==
Year	English title	Original title	Role	Notes
2017	Feng Menglong's Legend	馮夢龍傳奇	Feng Menglong	
2018	My Kitchen Lover	泡菜爱上小龙虾		Producer
2018	Ancient City Community Police	古城片警		
TBA	Rishengchang	風雨日昇昌	Li Daquan	
