= Shenyang Conservatory of Music =

Music school in Shenyang, China

- 沈阳音乐学院
- Former name: Luxun Academy of Arts
- Established: 1938
- Students: 8,000
- Location: Shenyang, Liaoning, China
- Website: www.sycm.com.cn

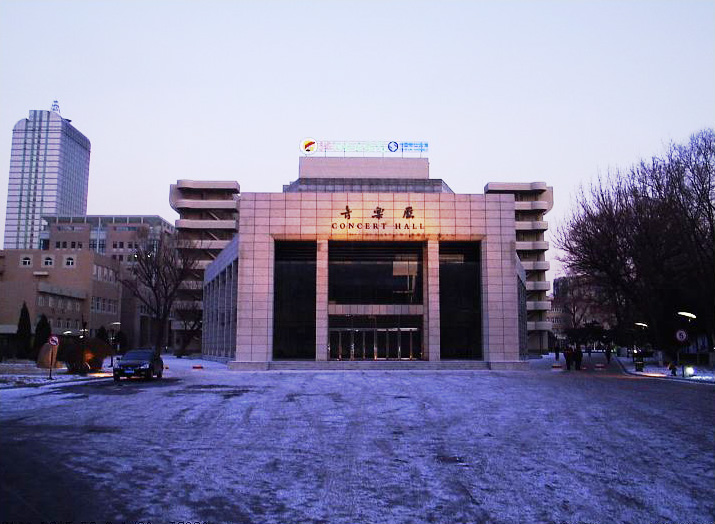

Shenyang Conservatory of Music (Chinese: 沈阳音乐学院) is a music college in Shenyang, capital of Liaoning Province, China. It is one of nine major conservatories in China. Established in 1938, the school serves approximately 8,000 students in undergraduate, graduate, and professional studies.

== History ==
The school was founded in 1938 as Luxun Academy of Arts (鲁迅艺术文学院) by Chinese Communist Party leaders, including Mao Zedong and Zhou Enlai, Lin Boch, Xu Teli, Cheng Fangwu, Ai Siqi, Zhou Yang and other older generations of proletarian revolutionaries in the town of Yan'an, Shaanxi province. The school moved to Shenyang and was renamed the Northeast Lu Xun College of Literature and Art at the end of 1948. In 1953, the Musical Technical School of the Northeast was founded on the base of the Academy's music department and was renamed the Shenyang Conservatory of Music. Shenyang Conservatory of Music is one of the best famous conservatory in China. In 2008, the Conservatory celebrated its 70th anniversary. In 2016, the college was identified as the key construction university of the first-class university in Liaoning Province by the government of Liaoning Province.

== Campus ==
The Shenyang Conservatory of Music has four campuses—Sanhao Campus (major campus), Chanqing Campus, Taoxian Campus and Dalian Campus. The school also has an attached secondary music school and an attached secondary dance school.

== Academics ==
=== Research center and department ===
As of January 2020, Shenyang Conservatory of Music has established academic research institutions such as the Music and Dance Research Institute, the Northeast Asian Music and Dance Research Center, Liaoning Humanities and Social Sciences Research Center, Chinese National Vocal Music Teaching Practice Innovation Center, LuYi Music Culture Research Institute, Northeast China Music Innovation Lab, Theatre and Film Research Center, and the Humanities and Arts Institute.

Shenyang Conservatory of Music has twelve departments: composition, musicology, Western vocal, Chinese vocal, orchestration, Chinese instruments, keyboards, music education, popular music, Electone, instrument making and repairing and dance.

There are 17 undergraduate majors such as art theory, music and dance, drama and film, and design in the arts. Music performance and composition and composition technology theory have been approved as national first-class undergraduate major construction sites. The college has two authorized master's degrees in art theory, music and dance, which are awarded by the Academic Degrees Committee of the State Council. In 2017, "Music and Dance" was approved as a first-class construction discipline in Liaoning Province. In 2019, Shenyang Conservatory of Music was identified by the provincial government as one of the 13 key support universities for the "double first-class" discipline construction of Liaoning colleges and universities. The Academic Degrees Committee of the State Council award authorized master's degrees in art theory, music, and dance.

=== Admissions ===
Graduate students: those who have achieved a higher level in their major and have strong research ability can apply for the admission of graduate students. If accepted, they can study SYCM's graduate program (3 years). After completing the study plan, passing the examination and completing the graduate thesis, the master's degree will be awarded.

Undergraduate: those who have reached the level of Chinese high school students can apply for admission. After enrollment, students can follow the undergraduate (composition, musicology 4-year, 5-year) teaching system and teaching plan. They are in the same class as Chinese students for the necessary core subjects, except for the major subjects. International students can add or subtract some courses according to their different situation. After passing the examination and thesis defense, the bachelor's degree will be awarded.

Ordinary further study: SYCM is open to secondary school leavers from all ethnic groups up to the age of 16. After enrollment, students can learn the major and required core courses according to their requirements and actual conditions. They may add other courses as well. There is no time limit. After passing the examination, a certificate of advanced study will be issued.

Chinese language learners: Students who want to master Chinese quickly and in a short time can apply for this program. There is no time limit. Apart from learning Chinese (in small classes), students can also apply for elective courses such as instrumental performance, singing and drama according to their interests.

Short-term professional training: Students who want to improve their professional level in a short time can apply. There is no time limit.

Short-term tourist class: students interested in Chinese history, local customs and traditional culture can apply. The tour includes visiting China's historical sites and scenic spots, as well as learning about traditional customs and folk music. The course lasts 15 days.

Chinese culture experience class: students who are interested in Chinese traditional culture can sign up for it. The course includes an introduction to traditional Chinese culture, a variety of traditional Musical Instruments, and an experience in a Chinese home. A one-week course.

== Ranking ==
The country rank of the conservatory is 162 and the world rank is 1637.
