= Xi'an Conservatory of Music =

Music school in Xi'an, China

- 西安音乐学院
- Motto: 明德教化 乐音至善
- Type: Public University
- Established: 1949
- Location: Xi'an, Shaanxi, China; 34.23057704°N 108.93769872°E
- Website: www.xacom.edu.cn

The Xi'an Conservatory of Music (Chinese: 西安音乐学院; pinyin: Xī'ān Yīnyuè Xuéyuàn) is a music school located at Xi'an, Shaanxi, China. It is the only institution of higher music in the northwest of China.

== History ==
The college was founded in 1949, formerly known as the "Northwest Military and Political University College of Art". The school changed its name to the "Northwest College of Art Department of Music" in 1950. The school combined its music department and fine art department into the Northwest Technical School of Art in 1953, and the Xi'an Technical School of Music was founded in 1956 at the site of the school's music department. The school changed its name to the Xi'an Conservatory of Music in 1960.

Xi'an Conservatory of Music has four undergraduate majors in Musicology, Composition and Compositional Technology Theory, Music Performance, and Dance Choreography, and ten undergraduate teaching units in Vocal, Orchestral, Folk Music, Composition, Musicology, Music Education, Piano, Dance Choreography, and Sight Singing, Ear Training, and Basic Department. There are more than 4,000 undergraduate students and 200 graduate students. Its attached pre-college school (grades 7–12) currently has over 4000 students. The conservatory's president is Zhao Jiping.

Xi'an Conservatory of Music has several academic journals, among which Symphony, founded in 1982, is the most influential, is a comprehensive music academic quarterly openly distributed in China as well as internationally, and is included in the Chinese Core Journals (Selection) Database.

== Notable alumni ==
- Zhao Jiping: Chinese composer
