= China Conservatory of Music =

Public music college in Beijing, China

- 中国音乐学院
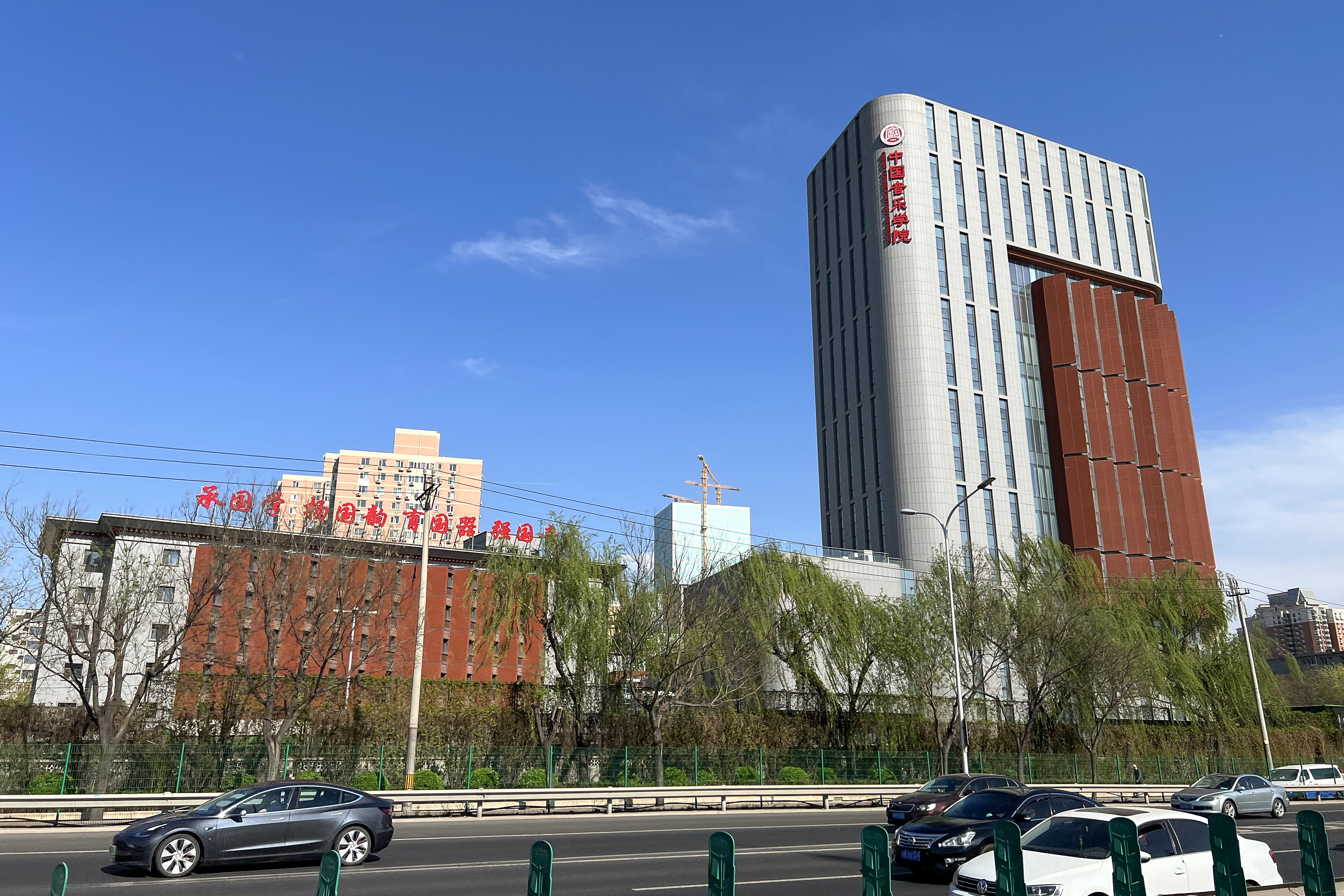
- Type: Public
- Established: September 21, 1964; 62 years ago
- President: Li Xincao (李心草)
- Party Secretary: Wang Xudong (王旭东)
- Faculty: 300
- Location: Chaoyang, Beijing, China
- Campus: Urban
- Website: www.ccmusic.edu.cn

China Conservatory of Music
- Chinese: 中国音乐学院
- Simplified Chinese: 中国音乐学院
- Traditional Chinese: 中國音樂學院
Transcriptions
Standard Mandarin
- Hanyu Pinyin: ZhōngGuó YīnYuè XuéYuàn
- Yale Romanization: ZhūngGwó YīnYwè SywéYwàn

The China Conservatory of Music (CCMusic; Chinese: 中国音乐学院; pinyin: Zhōngguó Yīnyuè Xuéyuàn) is a municipal music academy in Chaoyang, Beijing, China. The school is affiliated with the City of Beijing, and co-funded by the Beijing Municipal People's Government and the Ministry of Culture and Tourism. The school is a higher music education institution that aims at Chinese ethnic music education, research, performance, and creation. It was established in 1964 and is part of the Double First-Class Construction.

== History ==
The China Conservatory of Music was initially established in 1956 by the merger of the art and music departments of Beijing Normal University, East China Normal University and Northeast Normal University. In 1964, at the suggestion of Zhou Enlai, Premier of the State Council of the People's Republic of China, the Department of Music of the Beijing Academy of Fine Arts, the Ethnic Music Program of the Central Conservatory of Music and the China Music Research Institute were merged to form the China Conservatory of Music. In 1969, the whole school was decentralized during the Cultural Revolution, while the original establishment was restored in 1980. At present, the vast majority of China's famous singers in folk singing and folk instrumentalists are almost all graduates of the China Conservatory of Music.

== Rankings and reputation ==
The China Conservatory is generally regarded as one of the leading institutions for the study of traditional Chinese music and traditional Chinese musical instruments, and it also has strong programs in music education research and other fields. Along with the Central Conservatory of Music (also located in Beijing) and Shanghai Conservatory of Music, it is one of the three most well-known higher education music institutions in China.

== Notable alumni ==
- Dadon
- Gong Linna
- Peng Liyuan
- Wu Fei
- You Hongfei
