= Era (radio station) =

- Kuala Lumpur; Malaysia
- Broadcast area: Nationwide; Singapore (Era Johor); Batam City/Batam Island (Era Johor); Brunei (Era Sarawak); Thailand (Era Kedah)
- Frequencies: Era in Peninsular Malaysia: 103.3 MHz - 102.8 MHz; Era Sarawak: 96.1 MHz - 101.3 MHz; Era Sabah: 102.4 MHz - 103.4 MHz
- RDS: ERA

Programming
- Language: Malay
- Format: Top 40 (CHR)
- Affiliations: Astro Audio

Ownership
- Owner: Astro Malaysia Holdings Berhad
- Sister stations: List: Sinar; Zayan; THR Gegar; Raaga; My; Melody; GoXuan; Hitz; Mix; Lite

History
- First air date: 1996; 30 years ago (Astro-only audio channel); 1998; 28 years ago (FM broadcasting)
- Former names: Era FM (1998–2017)

Links
- Webcast: Syok; TuneIn (Klang Valley and Kelantan)
- Website: ERA

Era (stylized ERA on radio, formerly Era FM until 2017) is a Malaysian Malay-language radio station operated by Astro Audio. The radio station broadcasts 24 hours a day, 7 days a week, from Astro Radio's Bukit Jalil headquarters in Kuala Lumpur.

Era began in 1996 as an exclusive audio channel for Astro satellite users, before migrating to the FM band on 1 August 1998. Since its launch, it has played a wider mixture of music from the 1980s to present, and covers Malaysian and international pop genres. It also operates part-time opt-outs from Kuala Lumpur for audiences in Sabah and Sarawak, which downsized its respective local operations since 2023.

In 2015, as according to Nielsen RAM Survey Wave #1, Era FM maintained its position as Malaysia's leading Malay-language station with over 4.8 million listeners.

== History ==
Era's flagship frequency slot, which is 103.3 FM in Klang Valley, was originally known as Classic Rock, one of the five radio stations first introduced by AMP Radio Networks along with Hitz FM, Mix FM, Light & Easy and TalkRadio (whose frequencies were taken over by My FM on 1 August that year). It launched on the Malaysian FM airwaves in January 1997 after being one of Astro's audio-only channels since the launch of the satellite network in October the year before. Over the one-year period, demand grew for radio content in Bahasa Malaysia, as listeners who were exposed to AMP's English brands wanted the same formats but in other major local languages. This compelled AMP to make changes to its line-up, swapping Classic Rock to Era FM, leaving Classic Rock as an Astro-only radio station.

On 1 August 1998, Era FM went on air as the first private radio station to be broadcast completely in the Malay language, with "Hijau" by Zainal Abidin, which is a trademark for the radio station, being the first song to be played on the radio station, ending the monopoly of Malay-language radio stations run by state-run Radio RTM.

Era FM was once the leader in Malay-language FM radio stations, but has lost its popularity to its sister station, Sinar FM. In 2012, Era FM regained the top spot as the most popular radio station in Malaysia with close to 5 million listeners. Era FM is the first radio station in Malaysia to hold three records in the Malaysia Book Of Records since 1998.

On 2 January 2018, Era FM was rebranded to ERA in a move by Astro Radio to integrate multiple platforms beyond traditional radio. At the same time, a new logo was also unveiled with the rebranding. Era announcer Haniff left the station on 31 July 2024; he last presented Petang Era until his resignation.

=== Era in East Malaysia ===
Prior to 2000, like its main sister stations, Era FM did not have any stations in Sabah and Sarawak.

In 2010, Era FM began opt-out programming for Sabah and Sarawak in East Malaysia, with their own studio and on-the-ground team in Kota Kinabalu and Kuching, respectively; as well as local announcers and DJs conversing in Malay and different East Malaysian languages.

Between 2017 and 2018, Sabah and Sarawak opt-outs were upgraded to full-fledged local outlets, with all content originating from their respective capital cities 24 hours a day, and ending reliance with its Kuala Lumpur flagship during off-peak hours. Era FM Sabah became fully-local on 24 April 2017; Era Sarawak followed suit on 22 January 2018.

==== Downsizing of ERA Sabah and ERA Sarawak ====
On 30 September 2023, layoffs were imposed to local staffing in Sabah and Sarawak, which led to the end of five to six years of ERA's state-based feeds from Kota Kinabalu and Kuching, respectively. The following day, all transmitters in East Malaysia carrying ERA were downgraded back into direct relays from Kuala Lumpur.

On 8 January 2024, ERA Sarawak and ERA Sabah partially reintroduced local programming, albeit with presenters originating from Astro's HQ in Bukit Jalil.

== Frequencies and availability ==
ERA Frequencies

Frequencies	Area	Transmitter
103.3 MHz	Klang Valley	Gunung Ulu Kali
103.3 MHz	Kota Bahru, Kelantan	Bukit Panau
103.6 MHz	Perlis, Alor Setar, Kedah and Penang	Mount Jerai
103.6 MHz	Seremban, Negeri Sembilan	Mount Telapak Buruk
90.7 MHz	Langkawi, Kedah	Gunung Raya
95.2 MHz	Taiping, Perak	Bukit Larut
103.7 MHz	Ipoh, Perak	Gunung Kledang
90.3 MHz	Malacca	Mount Ledang
104.5 MHz	Johor Bahru, Johor and Singapore	Mount Pulai
98.0 MHz	Kuantan, Pahang	Bukit Pelindung
102.8 MHz	Kuala Terengganu, Terengganu	Bukit Jerung

ERA Sarawak & ERA Sabah Frequencies

Frequencies	Area	Transmitter
96.1 MHz	Kuching, Sarawak	Bukit Djin
96.3 MHz	Sibu, Sarawak	Bukit Lima
101.3 MHz	Miri, Sarawak and Belait District, Brunei	Bukit Lambir
102.4 MHz	Kota Kinabalu, Sabah	Bukit Karatong
103.0 MHz	Sandakan, Sabah	Bukit Trig

=== Television ===
Platform TV	Channel
Astro/Astro NJOI	856

== Adhan ==
On rebranding on 1 January 2018, this station had no Adhan (except Subuh for Ramadan and Maghrib), but in January 2022, this channel brought back Azan for all obligatory prayer time due to the new tagline "Muzik Hit Terkini" replacing "Muzik Hit Terbaik".

== In popular culture ==
Era was parodised as Erron in Afdlin Shauki's 2004 film, Buli.

== Controversies ==
=== Religion mocking incident ===
On 4 March 2025, ERA FM uploaded a video clip showing one of the morning presenters mocking a religious ritual, which is a sacred Hindu kavadi dance ritual usually performed during Thaipusam. The video clip which were uploaded in social media have sparked outrage from the Malaysian Indian community. The video clip were since taken down and the presenters have apologized for their mistakes and acknowledging the insensitivity of their actions. This incident caused all three morning presenters to be suspended from being on-air hosts and being investigated by the Malaysian Communications and Multimedia Commission (MCMC) and the police including 3 staff members.

== Similar radios ==
- Trax FM/I-Radio in Indonesia
