= Raaga (radio station) =

Kuala Lumpur; Malaysia
- Broadcast area: Malaysia (Peninsular Malaysia); Singapore and Indonesia (Raaga Johor only)
- RDS: RAAGA

Programming
- Language: Tamil
- Format: Contemporary hit radio
- Affiliations: Astro Radio

Ownership
- Owner: Astro Malaysia Holdings Berhad
- Sister stations: List: Era; Era Sabah; Era Sarawak; Sinar; Zayan; THR Gegar; My; Melody; GoXuan; Hitz; Mix; Lite

History
- First air date: 1 January 2005; 21 years ago
- Former names: THR Raaga (01.01.2005 - 31.12.2017)

Links
- Webcast: audio1.syok.my/raaga
- Website: raaga.syok.my

Raaga (formerly THR Raaga, stylised as raaga) is a Malaysian Tamil-language radio station operated by Astro Radio. In 2015, as according to Nielsen RAM Survey Wave #1, THR Raaga maintained its position as Malaysia's leading Tamil-language station with over two million listeners. It also emerged as South East Asia's No.1 Tamil radio station by beating state-owned Minnal FM and Singapore-based Oli 96.8FM.

The station is well known for its breakfast show, Kalakkal Kaalai, which began broadcasting on 1 August 2006. The Hindi Power is also carried on the station since early 2010, which was previously broadcast on Gegar.

THR Raaga became a 24-hour radio station on all FM frequencies for the first time in July 2018, removing the entire Gegar broadcasts during 02:00 to 06:00. Previously, Raaga's broadcasts during these hours was only available via online and Channel 859 Astro.

== History ==
The radio station began broadcasting on 9 September 1994, after having started test transmission nine days before (31 August). It was known as TIME Highway Radio until 2005 and includes segments in Malay (Gegar), English and for a short period, in Mandarin (Mun Toh Tak), with Tamil-language segment (Raaga) being introduced later, as well as Hindi Power, a segment that focused mainly on Bollywood music. By March 2002, Tamil programs on THR accounted for 40 percent of THR's daily broadcasting time. AMP Radio Networks acquires the radio station in 2005 to relaunch a brand new radio channel to broadcast in Tamil.

From 2 January 2018, with the reformulation of radio stations owned by Astro, the "THR Raaga" name was simplified to Raaga, ending the usage of THR name after 23 years. The change also happens to THR Gegar, which is now known as Gegar. As with other radio stations within Astro Radio group, the "FM" suffix is no longer used and a new logo was given to each of the radio stations.

== Frequency ==
Frequencies	Area	Transmitter
99.3 MHz	Klang Valley	Gunung Ulu Kali
102.4 MHz	Perlis, Alor Setar, Kedah and Penang	Mount Jerai
101.9 MHz	Langkawi, Kedah	Gunung Raya
102.1 MHz	Taiping, Perak	Bukit Larut
97.9 MHz	Ipoh, Perak	Gunung Kledang
101.5 MHz	Seremban, Negeri Sembilan	Mount Telapak Buruk
99.7 MHz	Malacca	Mount Ledang
103.7 MHz	Johor Bahru, Johor and Singapore	Mount Pulai

(Via satellite TV)

- Astro: Channel 859

Note: Raaga can be received in Pahang via existing frequencies below:

- 99.3 MHz in Bentong, Karak, Raub, Lurah Bilut, Lanchang, Temerloh, Mentakab, Benta, Padang Tengku, Kuala Lipis, Sungai Ruan, Chenor, Maran, Jengka, Pekan, Gambang and part of Kuantan. (from Gunung Ulu Kali)

- 101.5 MHz in Bandar Bera (from Gunung Telapak Buruk)

- 99.7 MHz in Kemayan, Teriang, Jerantut, Raub, Mengkarak, Kota Shahbandar, Bandar Muadzam Shah, and Bandar Tun Abdul Razak (Keratong) (from Gunung Ledang)

- 97.9 MHz in Cameron Highlands (from Gunung Kledang)

== Awards ==
- Kancil Festival 2007 - Silver Award

== Gallery ==
Previous logo.
