= Sinar (radio station) =

- Kuala Lumpur; Malaysia
- Broadcast area: Malaysia; Singapore and Indonesia (Sinar Johor only); Brunei (Sinar Sarawak only); Thailand (Sinar Kedah and Sinar Kelantan only)
- RDS: SINAR

Programming
- Language: Malay
- Format: Classic hits, Adult contemporary
- Affiliations: Astro Radio

Ownership
- Owner: Astro Malaysia Holdings Berhad
- Sister stations: List: Era; Era Sabah; Era Sarawak; Zayan; THR Gegar; Raaga; My; Melody; GoXuan; Hitz; Mix; Lite

History
- First air date: 1 March 2004; 22 years ago
- Former names: Sinar FM (01.03.2004 - 31.12.2017)

Technical information
- Licensing authority: MCMC

Links
- Webcast: Syok; TuneIn (Klang Valley)
- Website: sinar.syok.my

Sinar (formerly Sinar FM, stylised as sinar on radio) is a Malaysian Malay-language radio station operated by Astro Radio. The radio station began broadcasting on 1 March 2004. The radio station focused on mature listeners and plays classic music from both local and foreign artists, compared to its sister stations, (Era, Gegar, and Zayan), which target younger and East Coast listeners, respectively. In 2015, as according to Nielsen RAM Survey Wave #1, Sinar maintained its position as Malaysia's second leading Malay-language station with over 3.7 million listeners.

Since the station launched at 1 March 2004, Sinar mostly plays retro hits for targeting listeners between the age of 25 to 39

== Frequency ==
Frequencies	Area	Transmitter
96.7 MHz	Klang Valley	Gunung Ulu Kali
97.1 MHz	Perlis, Alor Setar, Kedah and Penang	Mount Jerai
100.9 MHz	Langkawi, Kedah	Gunung Raya
96.4 MHz	Taiping, Perak	Bukit Larut
96.9 MHz	Ipoh, Perak	Gunung Kledang
96.9 MHz	Seremban, Negeri Sembilan	Mount Telapak Buruk
96.0 MHz	Malacca	Mount Ledang
87.8 MHz	Johor Bahru, Johor and Singapore	Mount Pulai
97.2 MHz	Kuantan, Pahang	Bukit Pelindung
97.5 MHz	Kuala Terengganu, Terengganu	Bukit Jerung
93.8 MHz	Kota Bharu, Kelantan	Bukit Panau
102.1 MHz	Kuching, Sarawak	Bukit Djin
96.6 MHz	Miri, Sarawak	Bukit Lambir
96.6 MHz	Kuala Belait, Brunei	Bukit Lambir
104.9 MHz	Kota Kinabalu, Sabah	Bukit Karatong
106.9 MHz	Sandakan, Sabah	Bukit Trig

=== Television satellite ===
- Astro: Channel 857

== Gallery ==
Previous logo (2015-17)
