= Melody (radio station) =

- Kuala Lumpur; Malaysia
- Broadcast area: Malaysia and Singapore
- RDS: MELODY

Programming
- Language: Chinese (Mandarin & Cantonese)
- Format: Contemporary hits and Talk
- Affiliations: Astro Radio

Ownership
- Owner: Astro Malaysia Holdings Berhad
- Sister stations: List: Era; Era Sabah; Era Sarawak; Sinar; Zayan; THR Gegar; Raaga; My; GoXuan; Hitz; Mix; Lite

History
- First air date: 15 August 2012; 13 years ago
- Former names: Melody FM (15.08.2012–31.12.2017)

Links
- Webcast: audio1.syok.my/amp-melody
- Website: melody.syok.my

Melody (formerly Melody FM, stylised as MELODY on radio) is a Malaysian Chinese-language radio station. It is managed by Astro Radio, a subsidiary of Astro Malaysia Holdings Berhad. Melody FM was launched since 15 August 2012. Its frequencies were formerly used by radio station XFM (Xfresh). It was the second Astro Chinese radio station in Malaysia after My FM. In addition, Melody FM was the fifth Chinese radio station in Malaysia. The radio plays the Chinese hits from the 90's to 2000's music. Its music selections and content target mature audience which ages between 25–49 years old. In 2015, as according to Nielsen RAM Survey Wave #1, Melody FM had reach 398k listeners.

== Frequency ==
| Frequencies | Area | Transmitter |
|---|---|---|
| 103.0 MHz | Klang Valley | Gunung Ulu Kali |
| 106.5 MHz | Perlis, Alor Setar, Kedah and Penang | Mount Jerai |
| 104.9 MHz | Taiping, Perak | Bukit Larut |
| 98.5 MHz | Ipoh, Perak | Gunung Kledang |
| 97.9 MHz | Seremban, Negeri Sembilan | Gunung Telapak Buruk |
| 107.3 MHz | Malacca | Mount Ledang |
| 98.4 MHz | Johor Bahru, Johor and Singapore | Mount Pulai |
| 103.3 MHz | Johor Bahru, Johor and Singapore | Johor Bahru Metropolis Tower |
| 100.0 MHz | Kuantan, Pahang | Bukit Pelindung |
| 104.0 MHz | Kuala Terengganu, Terengganu | Bukit Jerung |
| 99.8 MHz | Kota Bharu, Kelantan | Bukit Panau |
| 103.7 MHz | Kuching, Sarawak | Bukit Djin |
| 98.6 MHz | Kota Kinabalu, Sabah | Bukit Karatong |

=== Television satellite ===
- Astro: Channel 858

== Gallery ==
Previous logo.
