= My (radio station) =

My FM
- Kuala Lumpur; Malaysia
- Broadcast area: Malaysia; Singapore and Indonesia (MY Johor only); Thailand (MY Kedah only)
- RDS: MY

Programming
- Languages: Mandarin & Cantonese (main)
- Format: Top 40 (CHR)
- Affiliations: Astro Radio

Ownership
- Owner: Astro Malaysia Holdings
- Sister stations: List: Era; Era Sabah; Era Sarawak; Sinar; Zayan; THR Gegar; Raaga; Melody; GoXuan; Hitz; Mix; Lite

History
- First air date: 1 August 1998; 28 years ago
- Last air date: 1 October 2023; 3 years ago (My Sabah & Sarawak)

Links
- Webcast: Syok; TuneIn (Peninsular Malaysia only)
- Website: my.syok.my

My (stylized as My FM on radio) is a Malaysian-Chinese language radio station managed by Astro Radio, a subsidiary of Astro Malaysia Holdings Berhad. In 2015, as according to Nielsen RAM Survey Wave #1, My FM maintained its position as Malaysia's leading Chinese-language station with over 2.0 million listeners, it was challenged by 988 which is currently the leading Chinese radio station there.

== History ==
My FM went on air on 1 August 1998, after previously broadcast as an Astro-only radio channel since the launch of the satellite network in October 1996 under the name Chuan Zhen Xin Qu Tai (Chinese name: 傳真心曲台, literally "Fax heart song"). Prior to this, the frequencies of MY FM was used by TalkRadio, along with Hitz FM, Mix FM, Light & Easy and Classic Rock (still available on Astro and online, frequency taken over by Era FM, which also began broadcasting on 1 August of that year) was among the earliest privately owned English language radio stations to be broadcast in Malaysia, having launched into the airwaves in 1997. It was the second private Chinese radio station in Malaysia after REDI-FM 98.8 (now 988), which had begun broadcasting two years earlier as a trilingual station, but Chinese content represents 50 percent of its programming before it was relaunched as full-fledged Chinese radio station in December 1997. The country had only one Chinese-language radio station before this, which was the government-owned Radio Malaysia Channel 5.

Originally, the radio station mainly focused on Chinese songs for all ages. However, with the launch of Melody FM in August 2012, which replaced XFM on Astro and FM frequencies (continued as an online station but is now defunct), some older songs and announcers were moved from MY FM to that new radio station.

On 30 September 2023, Astro Radio stopped its operations in Sabah and Sarawak and returned to Bukit Jalil.

== Frequency ==
Frequencies	Area	Transmitter
101.8 MHz	Klang Valley	Gunung Ulu Kali
99.7 MHz	Perlis, Alor Setar, Kedah and Penang	Mount Jerai
100.1 MHz	Langkawi, Kedah	Gunung Raya
100.2 MHz	Taiping, Perak	Bukit Larut
100.6 MHz	Ipoh, Perak	Gunung Kledang
100.6 MHz	Seremban, Negeri Sembilan	Mount Telapak Buruk
100.6 MHz	Sandakan, Sabah	Bukit Trig
106.4 MHz	Malacca	Mount Ledang
95.4 MHz	Johor Bahru, Johor and Singapore	Mount Pulai
101.1 MHz	Kuantan, Pahang	Bukit Pelindung
101.2 MHz	Kuala Terengganu, Terengganu	Bukit Jerung
102.3 MHz	Kota Bharu, Kelantan	Bukit Panau
96.9 MHz	Kuching, Sarawak	Bukit Djin
103.2 MHz	Miri, Sarawak	Bukit Lambir
104.0 MHz	Kota Kinabalu, Sabah	Bukit Karatong

=== Television satellite ===
- Astro: Channel 853

== Gallery ==
Previous logo.(2008-2018)
