= Lite (radio station) =

Malaysian national radio station

Coordinates: 3.0519°N 101.7011°E

LITE
- Kuala Lumpur; Malaysia
- Broadcast area: Malaysia; Singapore and Indonesia (Lite Johor only)
- RDS: LITE

Programming
- Language: English
- Format: Classic hits (since 2006); Oldies (1996–2006); Easy listening (2006–2022); Adult contemporary (2006–2022)
- Network: Astro Radio

Ownership
- Owner: Astro Malaysia Holdings Berhad
- Sister stations: List: Era; Era Sabah; Era Sarawak; Sinar; Zayan; THR Gegar; Raaga; My; Melody; GoXuan; Hitz; Mix

History
- First air date: January 1997; 29 years ago
- Former names: Light & Easy (01.1997- 19.11.2006); Lite FM (20.11.2006 - 31.12.2017)

Technical information
- Licensing authority: MCMC

Links
- Webcast: Syok
- Website: lite.syok.my

Lite (formerly known as Lite FM on radio) is one of Malaysia's English-language radio stations managed by Astro Radio, a subsidiary of Astro Malaysia Holdings Berhad. The station mostly plays Classic hits from the 1960s, 1970s, 1980s and 1990s which targeting listeners between the age of 35 to 49. Unlike any other stations by Astro Radio, Lite have the lowest weekly listeners based on GfK Radio Audience Measurement (RAM), Wave 1 in June 2019, Lite dropped by 0.24% to 831k weekly listeners.

== History ==
LiteFM was launched into Malaysian FM airwaves in January 1997 after being one of Astro's audio-only channels since the launch of the satellite network in October the year before. It was formerly known as Light & Easy and was renamed "Lite FM" on 20 November 2006. Lite FM began in 1997 as an oldies format focusing on songs mainly from the 1950s to the 1970s, targeting an older audience above 45 years old.

On 1 January 2018, the station (along with 10 other sister radio stations) dropped the suffix "FM" from its brand name as part of Astro Radio's major rebranding project to focus on the digital platform. A new logo was also unveiled.

Beginning August 2021, Lite changed its radio jingles/sweepers on the radio to "Lite FM" (along with its sister stations, Hitz and Mix). Therefore, hinting that the radio station itself might go through another rebranding in the near future.

1950s music are occasionally heard again on the station due to strong demand from listeners wanting more golden tracks.

Lite adopts the classic hits radio format with the majority of the playlist consisting of classic hits music from the 1960s, 1970s, 1980s and 1990s.

On 19 August 2022, Lite FM changed its slogan to All-Time Favourites in conjunction with the 25th anniversary or the silver jubilee anniversary celebrations of the station since it was officially launched in 1997. The station's music playlist has since changed to play classic hits from the 1960s, 1970s, 1980s and 1990s.

== Frequency ==
Frequencies	Area	Transmitter
105.7 MHz	Klang Valley	Gunung Ulu Kali
104.4 MHz	Perlis, Alor Setar, Kedah and Penang	Mount Jerai
89.3 MHz	Taiping, Perak	Bukit Larut
101.5 MHz	Ipoh, Perak	Gunung Kledang
104.6 MHz	Seremban, Negeri Sembilan	Mount Telapak Buruk
92.2 MHz	Malacca	Mount Ledang
94.6 MHz	Johor Bahru, Johor and Singapore	Mount Pulai
104.7 MHz	Kuantan, Pahang	Bukit Pelindung
105.9 MHz	Kuala Terengganu, Terengganu	Bukit Jerung
104.3 MHz	Kota Bharu, Kelantan	Bukit Panau
100.1 MHz	Kuching, Sarawak	Bukit Djin
103.2 MHz	Kota Kinabalu, Sabah	Bukit Karatong

=== Television satellite ===
- Astro (television): Channel 854

== Gallery ==
Former LiteFM logo (Before 2018).

== Similar radios ==
- Most Radio and Brava Radio in Jakarta, Indonesia
