= Zayan (radio station) =

- Kuala Lumpur; Malaysia
- Broadcast area: Peninsular Malaysia and Singapore
- RDS: ZAYAN

Programming
- Language: Malay
- Format: Contemporary hits, talk
- Affiliations: Astro Radio

Ownership
- Owner: Astro Malaysia Holdings Berhad
- Sister stations: List: Era; Era Sabah; Era Sarawak; Sinar; THR Gegar; Raaga; My; Melody; GoXuan; Hitz; Mix; Lite

History
- First air date: 2 October 2017; 8 years ago

Links
- Webcast: audio1.syok.my/zayan
- Website: zayan.my

Zayan (formerly Zayan FM, stylised as zayan on radio) is a Malaysian Malay language radio station operated by Astro Radio. The radio station went on air on 2 October 2017. Its frequencies were formerly used by The Star's former radio station, Red FM. The radio station targets Muslim listeners aged 18–35 and plays music from local and international artists, as well as mainly Islamic-related content. It is the first Islamic radio station operated by Astro Radio.

== Frequency ==
Frequencies	Area	Transmitter	Note
104.9 MHz	Klang Valley	Gunung Ulu Kali	This frequency was formerly used by Red FM
98.1 MHz	Perlis, Alor Setar, Kedah and Penang	Mount Jerai	This frequency was formerly used by Red FM
106.4 MHz	Ipoh, Perak	Gunung Kledang	This frequency was formerly used by Red FM
98.9 MHz	Malacca	Mount Ledang	This frequency was formerly used by Red FM
92.8 MHz	Johor Bahru, Johor and Singapore	Mount Pulai	This frequency was formerly used by Red FM
91.6 MHz	Kuantan, Pahang	Bukit Pelindung	This frequency was formerly used by Red FM

(Via satellite TV)

- Astro: Channel 876
