= Mix (Malaysian radio station) =

Kuala Lumpur; Malaysia
- Broadcast area: Malaysia and Singapore
- RDS: MIX

Programming
- Language: English
- Format: Talk, Adult contemporary
- Affiliations: Astro Radio

Ownership
- Owner: Astro Malaysia Holdings Berhad
- Sister stations: List: Era; Era Sabah; Era Sarawak; Sinar; Zayan; THR Gegar; Raaga; My; Melody; GoXuan; Hitz; Lite

History
- First air date: January 1997; 29 years ago
- Former names: Mix FM (01.01.1997 - 31.12.2017)

Links
- Webcast: Syok; TuneIn (Klang Valley)
- Website: mix.syok.my

Mix (formerly Mix FM, stylised as mix on radio) is a Malaysian national radio station managed by Astro Radio, a subsidiary of Astro Malaysia Holdings Berhad. The station plays adult contemporary music from the 90s and now, targeting listeners between the ages of 25 to 39. In 2015, as according to Nielsen RAM Survey Wave #2, Mix FM recorded an average weekly audience of 245,000.

== History ==
Mix, alongside sister channels Hitz and Lite, was among the first privately owned English language radio stations to be broadcast in Malaysia, having launched into the airwaves in January 1997 after being one of Astro's audio-only channels since the launch of the satellite network in October the year before. The country had only one English language radio station before this, which was the government-owned Radio Malaysia Channel 4.

Originally, the radio station mainly focused on 1980s music in its fare.

On January 1, 2018, the station (along with 10 other radio stations) dropped the suffix "FM" from its brand name as part of the Astro Radio’s major rebranding project to focus on digital platform. A new logo was also unveiled.

Beginning August 2021, MIX changed its radio jingles/sweepers on the radio to "Mix FM" (along with its sister stations, Hitz and Lite).

== Frequency ==
Frequencies	Area	Transmitter
94.5 MHz	Klang Valley	Gunung Ulu Kali
91.0 MHz	Perlis, Alor Setar, Kedah and Penang^	Mount Jerai
91.3 MHz	Taiping, Perak	Bukit Larut
94.3 MHz	Ipoh, Perak	Gunung Kledang
94.2 MHz	Seremban, Negeri Sembilan	Mount Telapak Buruk
91.1 MHz	Malacca	Mount Ledang
99.1 MHz	Johor Bahru, Johor and Singapore	Mount Pulai
94.1 MHz	Kuantan, Pahang	Bukit Pelindung
98.3 MHz	Kuala Terengganu, Terengganu	Bukit Besar
94.6 MHz	Kota Bharu, Kelantan	Bukit Panau
97.7 MHz	Kuching, Sarawak	Bukit Djin
101.6 MHz	Kota Kinabalu, Sabah	Bukit Karatong

The station is also available on the Astro satellite TV service through channel 855.

^ Mix FM 91.0 MHz was unavailable in Balik Pulau and Teluk Kumbar due to adjacent channel interference from RTM Mutiara FM 90.9 MHz Bukit Genting which covers the locations, but Mix can be tuned via FM 91.3 MHz from Bukit Larut in Balik Pulau and Teluk Kumbar alternatively.

== Gallery ==
Previous logo.
