= Paperplane Pursuit =

Malaysian pop band

- Origin: Kuala Lumpur, Malaysia
- Genres: Pop
- Years active: 2009–2019
- Label: Breaking Music Sdn. Bhd.
- Members: John O (Vocals); Dru Yap (Drums); Isaac Ravi (Guitars); The Chief (Bass)
- Past members: Irwan Haadi (Guitars); Wern-Jhien (Keyboards); Hiang Liang (Bass Guitar)
- Website: www.paperplanepursuit.com

Paperplane Pursuit is a Malaysian pop band based in Kuala Lumpur. The band currently consists of John O (lead vocalist), Dru Yap (drummer), Isaac Ravi (guitarist) and The Chief (bassist). Past members include Irwan Haadi, Wern-Jhien and Hiang Liang. The group released their self-made debut album Malaysia 2.0 in 2011, and follow-up album Higher in 2014. Paperplane Pursuit's sound is upbeat, pop music for mainstream radio.

The band has independently and wholly created and produced their own music, accompanying music videos as well as their own studio spearheaded by lead vocalist John O.

Since their debut, the band has enjoyed success on mainstream Malaysian radio stations Hitz Fm, Fly Fm, Mix Fm, Red Fm and several other stations. The singles released from their album Higher including "What If", "Beat of Your Love", "Feel Good" and their latest single "Who's Gonna Stop Me?" have all peaked at number one on the Hitz Fm's Met 10 based on popular vote by their fans, Paperazzi, as they have been affectionately named by the band.

Their single, "Feel Good", reach the Billboard charts in the United States.

== History ==
=== 2009–2010 ===
The band formed in 2009 from Silent Scream. Paperplane Pursuit and first gained recognition in 2010 with their single 'Goodbye', released off their debut EP, Malaysia 2.0. The track enjoyed chart success in Malaysia and the accompanying music video made waves on MTV Asia, airing daily at the end of 2010.

=== 2011–2013 ===
In support of Malaysia 2.0, Paperplane Pursuit spent 2011 and 2012 performing live, and making radio and TV appearances.

In November 2012, they released 'Everybody Wants Somebody', the first single off their second EP, ‘Higher’. The single gained regular airplay on local radio stations. The band followed up in February 2013 with the release of their next single 'Higher (Ah Song)', which continued to receive attention on Malaysian radio. In September 2013, the band released their third single,'What If'.

In November 2013 Paperplane Pursuit was invited to perform 'What If' for The SHOUT! Awards 2013.

=== 2014 ===
The band’s breakthrough single ‘Beat Of Your Love’, featuring fellow Malaysian artist Darren Ashley, was released in January 2014. The single, "Feel Good", was first released in Malaysia in July 2014 and continued to be played daily on Malaysian radio well into February 2015, making the band one of the most played acts on Malaysian radio. The band headlined the H-artistry event in Malaysia. Paperplane Pursuit was a featured artist for the Amplified : Music Made of More series by Guinness which also included international artists such as Howie Day and MAGIC!. Paperplane Pursuit was also presented with 5th annual August Man Malaysia Men of The Year Awards 2014 for their music.

=== 2015 ===
The band is currently working on a full-length album, which will be released in early 2016. The album’s first single, titled ‘Who’s Gonna Stop Me?!’, is to be released in Malaysia in August 2016. The music video features Malaysian artistic gymnast and gold medalist Farah Ann Binti Abdul Hadi and was released worldwide on YouTube in September.

=== 2016 ===
Paperplane Pursuit supported 5 Seconds of Summer at the KL Convention Centre in Kuala Lumpur on 2 March 2016 during the Sounds Live Feels Live World Tour.

== Discography ==
=== Albums ===
- Malaysia 2.0 (2011)
- Higher (2014)
- Second Date (2017)

=== Singles ===
- "Everybody Wants Somebody" (2012)
- "What If" (2013)
- "Beat Of Your Love" (2014)
- "Feel Good" (2014)
- "Who's Gonna Stop Me?!"(2015)

== Awards ==
2008 MACP Awards

- Best Lyrics (Revolution)
- Best Vocals
- Best Performance
