= Hitz (radio station) =

Malaysian national radio station

Kuala Lumpur; Malaysia
- Broadcast area: Malaysia, Thailand, Indonesia, Singapore and Brunei
- RDS: HITZ

Programming
- Language: English
- Format: Top 40 (CHR), US Top 40
- Affiliations: Astro Radio

Ownership
- Owner: Astro Malaysia Holdings Berhad
- Sister stations: List: Era; Era Sabah; Era Sarawak; Sinar; Zayan; THR Gegar; Raaga; My; Melody; GoXuan; Mix; Lite

History
- First air date: 1 June 1996; 29 years ago
- Last air date: 1 October 2023; 2 years ago (Hitz Sabah & Sarawak)
- Former names: Hitz.FM (2001 - 2014); Hitz FM (2014 - 2017)

Links
- Webcast: Syok; TuneIn (Klang Valley)
- Website: hitz.syok.my

Hitz (formerly Hitz FM, stylised as hitz on radio) is a Malaysian national radio station managed by Astro Radio, a subsidiary of Astro Malaysia Holdings Berhad. The radio station name was changed from Hitz.FM to Hitz FM in 2014. In 2015, as according to Nielsen RAM Survey Wave #1, Hitz FM maintained its position as Malaysia's leading English-language station with over 1.2 million listeners. Hitz has a weekly audience of more than 2.2M listeners on radio. It targets listeners between the age of 10 to 29, according to Astro Radio. The radio station's slogan is "Malaysia's #1 Hit Music Station."

== History ==
January 1997: HITZ was launched into Malaysian FM airwaves in January 1997 after being one of Astro's audio-only channels since the launch of the satellite network in October the year before.

2000: the Malaysian Top 10 (later renamed Malaysian English Top 10) was introduced, airing every Sundays at 4pm to bring the limelight into local Malaysian music which would suit the tastes of Hitz FM's listeners, especially indie acts.

April 2001: HITZ undergoes rebranding as Hitz.FM (with a dot), introduces new online features like webcasts of their on-air announcers in action and radio streaming.

In August 2003, a rift between Li'l Kev and the management of AMP (Airtime Management and Programming) over the contract between them caused him and FlyGuy to leave Hitz.FM abruptly. Jason Lo and Rudy Sufian were called up to fill in their places and eventually became the new Morning Crew. (Later, Lo switched time slots with JJ Fernandez for the drive-home slot.) Later in the same year, HITZ.TV (Astro Hitz) was launched as a complement to the radio channel until it ceased broadcasting on 16 May 2016.

2005: The introduction of the Hitz FM Malaysian English Top 10 Awards to "honour the best of Malaysian English-singing musical talent and compositions".

2008: Rudy announced his decision to give up his morning show, confessing to having problems getting up in the mornings and needed to change his work pattern. Ean (real name Tengku Mohd Ean Nasrun) takes his place alongside JJ following the resignation until 2016.

September 2010: Hitz.FM was launched alongside its respective Malay and Chinese counterparts Era FM and My FM in East Malaysia - the three channels began broadcasting in Kuching on 25 October of that year followed by Kota Kinabalu on 1 December.

2014: Hitz.FM was rebranded again, this time it changed the name to Hitz FM.

On 1 January 2018, the station reverted to its original name as part of the Astro Radio's major rebranding project to focus on digital platforms. A new logo for Hitz was also unveiled during the rebranding.

On 19 October 2020, Hitz ended their "Gotcha" calls after more than a decade. It was a popular prank call segment on the Hitz Morning Crew show hosted by Ean and Arnold.

On 19 February 2021, Yusuf Shukri (widely known as Yusuf), an announcer from HITZ Sarawak received backlash and condemnation when he uploaded a video on his personal TikTok account that belittled the English intonation of a Science teacher, Rafidah Rahmat about human reproduction in the newly launched DidikTV channel by the Ministry of Education. Following the incident, Yusuf was suspended from his duties by Hitz and Astro Radio's management board while they investigate the matter. He then apologized for the outrageous action caused by him through a video posted on his Instagram. Three days later, Hitz accepted his resignation and have confirmed that Yusuf has resigned from his role as an announcer, the station did not elaborate on findings from an internal inquiry it launched after that deleted TikTok video of Yusuf.

Beginning 18 June 2021, HITZ started streaming their radio webcast through YouTube live on its channel round the clock non-stop.

On 1 October 2023, Astro Radio ended its operations in Sabah and Sarawak. Hitz Sabah and Hitz Sarawak has since moved to Kuala Lumpur.

Longtime announcer Ean left Hitz on 31 July 2024 after presenting the Hitz Morning Crew for more than 10 years.

== Frequency ==
Frequencies	Area	Transmitter
92.9 MHz	Klang Valley	Gunung Ulu Kali
92.8 MHz	Perlis, Alor Setar, Kedah and Penang	Mount Jerai
92.8 MHz	Kota Bharu, Kelantan	Bukit Panau
92.4 MHz	Langkawi, Kedah	Gunung Raya
93.6 MHz	Taiping, Perak	Bukit Larut
92.7 MHz	Ipoh, Perak	Gunung Kledang
95.0 MHz	Seremban, Negeri Sembilan	Mount Telapak Buruk
93.0 MHz	Malacca	Mount Ledang
97.6 MHz	Johor Bahru, Johor Singapore	Mount Pulai
93.2 MHz	Kuantan, Pahang	Bukit Pelindung
94.8 MHz	Kuala Terengganu, Terengganu	Bukit Jerung
95.3 MHz	Kuching, Sarawak	Bukit Djin
105.8 MHz	Miri, Sarawak	Bukit Lambir
100.8 MHz	Kota Kinabalu, Sabah	Bukit Karatong
99.8 MHz	Sandakan, Sabah	Bukit Trig
105.1 MHz	Sibu, Sarawak	Bukit Lima

=== Television satellite ===
- Astro: Channel 852

== Similar radios ==
- Prambors in Indonesia
- 987FM in Singapore, which covers some southern parts of Johor
