= 103.2 FM =

FM radio frequency

The following radio stations broadcast on FM frequency 103.2 MHz:

== Australia ==
- 2CBA at Sydney, NSW

== China ==
- CNR Music Radio in Hangzhou
- CNR The Voice of China in Changsha (during 05:00-23:00), Xiangtan, Yiyang, Yueyang, Yulin, and Zhuzhou

== Indonesia ==
- Radio Juan FM in Batam and Singapore

== Malaysia ==
- My in Miri, Sarawak and Bukit Lambir
- Lite in Kota Kinabalu, Sabah

== United Kingdom ==
- Capital South in Hampshire
- Capital South Wales in Cardiff
- Heart North West in Kendal
- Hits Radio North East in Hexham
- Insanity Radio
- Mansfield 103.2
- Nation Radio North East in Darlington
