= THR Gegar =

- Kuala Lumpur; Malaysia
- Broadcast area: Kelantan; Pahang; Terengganu
- RDS: GEGAR

Programming
- Language: Malay
- Format: Contemporary hits, Talk
- Affiliations: Astro Radio

Ownership
- Owner: Astro Malaysia Holdings Berhad
- Sister stations: List: Era; Era Sabah; Era Sarawak; Sinar; Zayan; Raaga; My; Melody; GoXuan; Hitz; Mix; Lite

History
- First air date: 1 January 2005; 21 years ago
- Former names: THR Gegar (01.01.2005 - 31.12.2017); Gegar (01.01.2018 - 13.02.2025)

Links
- Webcast: Syok; TuneIn
- Website: gegar.my

THR Gegar (formerly known as Gegar from 2018 until 13 February 2025) is a Malaysian Malay language radio station operated by Astro Radio.

== About ==
The radio station targets East Coast Peninsular listeners and plays music from local artists, as well as some Islamic-related content. In late 2017, the former THR Gegar was rated as the No. 1 radio brand on the East Coast, with 2.8 million weekly listeners by the GfK's Wave 2 Radio Audience Measurement (RAM).

The rebranding on 1 January 2018 removed the "THR" name from Gegar, and the change also happened to Raaga. However, the "THR" name was reverted from August 2024 onwards, with the new logo used from 13 February 2025.

Since July 2018, THR Gegar has broadcast from 02:00 to 06:00 on Raaga's FM frequencies was discontinued, and the latter became 24 hours. Previously, 24 hour broadcasts of Raaga were only available online and through Astro channel 859.

THR Gegar's frequencies are only broadcast in the East Coast of Peninsular Malaysia and not in other states.

== Frequency ==
Frequencies	Area	Transmitter
88.1 MHz	Kota Bharu, Kelantan	Bukit Panau
106.8 MHz	Kuala Terengganu, Terengganu	Bukit Jerung
88.8 MHz	Kuantan, Pahang	Bukit Pelindung

=== Television satellite ===
- Astro: Channel 863
