= THR.fm =

Programming
- Language: English
- Format: Contemporary hit radio
- Affiliations: Radio Lebuhraya Sdn. Bhd.

Ownership
- Owner: TIME Engineering Berhad

History
- First air date: 9 September 1994
- Last air date: 1 January 2005

Links
- Website: https://web.archive.org/web/20050616002017/http://www.thr.fm/

THR (short for "TIME Highway Radio") was a Malaysian radio station. It was the first private commercial radio station in the country, having based in the capital of Kuala Lumpur.

The station was originally the initiative and for some time the flagship station of the conglomerate TIME Engineering Berhad, and as the name suggests the station was targeted at road and highway users with traffic reports and entertainment. It heralded a new era in the Malaysian broadcasting scene as it was the first station to provide an alternative to government-owned Radio Televisyen Malaysia radio stations and it marked the beginning of a stiff competition for the Malaysian English-speaking audience, in turn affecting its own listenership as a whole.

== History ==
Plans to launch the radio station – then simply known as Radio Highway – began in April 1993. Radio Highway was a project of Radio Televisyen Malaysia and local private company TIME Engineering Berhad which was owned by Datuk Haji Mohd. Khalil Dato' Haji Mohd. Noor. The government also proposed to merge the station with yet-to-launch Langkawi-based Radio Tourism. Along with the latter, both stations would be carried through optic cables installed along the North-South Expressway and microwaves outside the expressway using the latest digital system.

The government gave the operating licence to the station in August 1994.

THR began its test transmission on the night of 31 August 1994 on FM 99.3 MHz from the Gunung Ulu Kali transmitter site covering the state of Selangor, Kuala Lumpur, and western Pahang. It operated out of a studio rented from Radio Televisyen Malaysia at the Angkasapuri building in Kuala Lumpur. On 9 September, at precisely 3:00 pm local time, symbolically in line with its '99.3' frequency THR officially came into being, operating in both Malay and English for 24 hours a day on the 80:20 formula - 80% broadcast time was in English, 20% in Malay; it was the second station in Malaysia to go round-the-clock after Klasik Nasional FM (then known as Radio 1) in 1971, and did so right out on the first day of its transmission.

The Malaysian Ministry of Information owns 30% stake on THR.

THR featured some of the best deejays in the local broadcasting industry such as flyguy, Richard La Faber, Gina, Andy Hakim, Daphne Nasir, Suzana, Deanna Nassem Rahman, Nasa, Rezz, Albert Ng, Sheela Haran, Kassandra Kassim, Glen Salay, and Simon D' Cruz. Most of the personnel would later continue working with other stations, shaping a legacy in Malaysian English radio broadcasting.

A year later in 1995, THR expanded its broadcast coverage area to Negeri Sembilan, Melaka and Johor; its broadcast could also be heard in Singapore - at one point THR proved so popular in Singapore, stations there felt threatened by the alarming rate at which listeners changed to the station. Johor Bahru-based Best 104 also began to feel the heat of the competition and decided to 'counterattack' by expanding its broadcast into Kuala Lumpur. between 1995 and 1998 competition for the English speaking audience was stiff between these two stations and Radio Televisyen Malaysia's own counterpart Radio 4.

Mohamed Nor Mohamed Amin, also known as Noramin, was the general manager of Time Highway Radio in 1995.

In 1996, THR moved into its own studio on Level 10 of Wisma TIME (building now owned by Johor Corporation as of November 2011) in Jalan Tun Razak, right in the heart of Kuala Lumpur's city centre. The same year saw broadcast coverage extended to the Northern states of Perak, Penang, Kedah and Perlis.

== Stiff competition and decline ==
The extension of Best 104's broadcast into THR's Klang Valley listener hinterland in 1996 presented a challenge of sorts to THR, with at least one deejay 'leaping' from THR to Best 104. However, it was the start of AMP Radio Network's HITZ FM broadcast in January 1997 that really hurt the popularity of THR, as it did Best 104.

Introduction of further English stations by AMP Radio Networks eroded the English listenership of both stations (THR and Best 104), upon which advertising revenues of both were largely dependent. AMP's stations provided the Malaysian radio audience with specialised genre playlist - with each station concentrating on one of the following - top hits, adult contemporary, and easy listening. Best 104 and THR themes were based on a combination of these genres, and the introduction of specialised station for each genre swayed listenership of the two stations away. Best 104 gradually decreased the time slot for English broadcast, from 10 hours a day to two, before finally ceasing the broadcasts in 2001. Following the number of Singaporeans who listens English broadcasts every day, the English broadcasts revived at the end of 2001 with the launch of a separate broadcast between 5:00 PM to 6:00 PM thus making it one hour.

THR briefly went from bilingual to trilingual, introducing Chinese time slots. It then dropped both the English and Chinese broadcast slots, retaining Malay slots and introducing Tamil broadcasts.

In 2002, THR expanded coverage to Kuantan, Kuala Terengganu and Kota Bharu, and Gegar was launched 24 hours as Malay East Coast radio station to compete against Manis FM.

In May 2004, THR entered a strategic partnership with Channel 9 following Medanmas' acquisition of THR's owner and operator, Anaza Sdn. Bhd.

== Current status ==
The station was eventually acquired by AMP Radio Networks (now Astro Radio) in 2005 and split into 2 different channels; the Tamil language section became THR Raaga and the Malay language section became THR Gegar, which broadcasts primarily on the East Coast region of Peninsular Malaysia.
