= Astro hitz =

Malaysian music video channel, 2003–2016

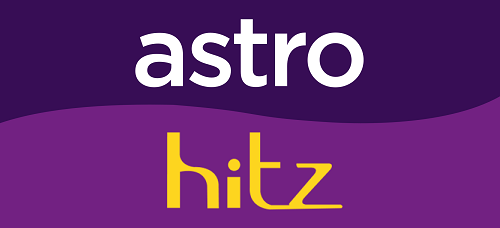
- Country: Malaysia
- Broadcast area: Malaysia

Programming
- Languages: English; Malay
- Picture format: 4:3 (SDTV)

Ownership
- Owner: Astro
- Sister channels: Astro Ria; Astro Prima; Astro Oasis; Astro Awani; Astro Bella; Astro Ceria; Astro Citra; Astro Warna; Astro Maya HD; Astro Mustika HD

History
- Launched: 20 October 2003; 22 years ago
- Closed: 16 May 2016; 10 years ago

Astro hitz, formerly known as HITZ.TV was a Malaysian music video channel provided by Astro. It made its debut on 20 October 2003 and served as a visual entertainment complement of hitz.fm, which was under Astro's radio management arm, AMP Radio Networks (now Astro Radio). Before the channel renumbering on 1 October 2007, the channel broadcast on channel 16, while broadcasting on channel 705 when the channel renumbering took effect.

The channel relaunched with its new name in March 2009.

In 2012, MeleTOP was selected on Astro Ria and Astro Maya HD also aired on Astro hitz for repeat on Wednesday.

Due to declining popularity of the channel and after 13 years of broadcasting, Astro hitz ceased broadcasting on 16 May 2016. The final video played on the channel was "People Like Us" by Kelly Clarkson.

== Video jockeys ==
- Adam Carruthers
- Serena Choong (2003–2009)
- Natalie Kniese
- Tengku Ean Mohd Nasrun
- Isabelle Zhen
- Alexis Sue-Ann
