= GoXuan (radio station) =

Kuala Lumpur; Malaysia
- Broadcast area: Klang Valley and Penang
- RDS: GOXUAN

Programming
- Language: Chinese
- Format: Talk, adult contemporary
- Affiliations: Astro Radio

Ownership
- Owner: Astro Malaysia Holdings Berhad; (Astro Media Solutions Sdn Bhd)
- Sister stations: List: Era; Era Sabah; Era Sarawak; Sinar; Zayan; THR Gegar; Raaga; My; Melody; Hitz; Mix; Lite

History
- First air date: 2 October 2017; 8 years ago

Technical information
- Licensing authority: MCMC

Links
- Webcast: audio1.syok.my/goxuan
- Website: goxuan.syok.my

GoXuan (formerly GoXuan FM, stylised as goxuan on radio) is a Malaysian Chinese language radio station operated by Astro Radio. The radio station went on air on 2 October 2017 and targets Chinese Generation Z listeners.

== Frequency ==
| Frequencies | Area | Transmitter |
|---|---|---|
| 88.9 MHz | Klang Valley | Gunung Ulu Kali |
| 107.6 MHz | Penang | Bukit Penara |

=== Television satellite ===
- Astro (television): Channel 877
