= Best FM (Malaysia) =

Coordinates: 1.48705°N 103.78151°E

- Johor Bahru; Malaysia
- Broadcast area: Johor Bahru; Singapore; Malacca
- Frequency: See list

Programming
- Language: Malay
- Format: Contemporary hit radio

Ownership
- Owner: Suara Johor Sdn Bhd

History
- First air date: 14 July 1989

Links
- Webcast: Best FM Webcast
- Website: bestfm.com.my/dengar

Best FM is both Malaysia's first private radio station (not the first commercial station, Time Highway Radio is the first), and the first to be based outside of Kuala Lumpur, in Johor Bahru, Johor, Malaysia. Its studios are located in the royal town of Pasir Pelangi. Targeting listeners aged between 25 and 45, the station plays modern keroncong, traditional Malay music and popular music from the 1990s to the present day.

== History ==
Best FM began transmission as Best 104 in 1989, primarily as a music-oriented station and acts as an alternative to its competitors – Batam's Zoo FM and Singapore's Perfect 10. The owner of the station at launch was Syarikat Mados, a local company specialising in timber and aviation business closely connected to the royal family of Johor. The launch was set for September.

It used to broadcast in both English and Malay, but fierce competition with other private stations broadcasting in English forced it to focus on the Malay speaking audience.

Azmil Mustapha, an actor, became the station manager in April 1991. The station had a staff of 17 people in 1992.

Also known as Suara Johor, it was regarded as "the best FM broadcast in the country".

Best FM was suffering from losses in 1993 as it was unable to sustain the operating costs.

Best FM began broadcasting 24 hours a day on 1 January 1996.

On 9 March 1996, Best FM became a commercial station, with the launch officiated by the then-Crown Prince Ibrahim.

Its commercialisation began when it extended its broadcast area to outside its native Johor state and the commencement of round-the-clock broadcast in 1996. Best 104 was at one time one of the more popular bilingual stations with listeners in Singapore and the national capital Kuala Lumpur; stiff competition for the English speaking audience caused the station to stop its English broadcast in 2001.

DJ Burhan Mohtaruddin, also known as BBD, held the world record of the longest on-air announcer after conducting the radio station non-stop for 104 hours, from midnight of 2 October 2000 until 8.00 a.m., 6 October 2000.

Julie Diana Omar Shariff, a deejay with Best FM, was almost kidnapped and killed by eleven men in October 2012.

In February 2014, Best 104 changed its name to Best FM.

In 2015, Best FM planned to open a studio at Berjaya Times Square in Kuala Lumpur.

As of 2019, Best FM was the second most listened Malay radio station in terms of listenership.

== Frequencies ==
Frequencies	Area	Transmitter
104.1 MHz	Johor Bahru, Johor and Singapore	Mount Pulai
94.8 MHz	Malacca and Northern Johor	Mount Ledang
102.5 MHz	Mersing, Johor	Bukit Tinggi
