= 94.2 FM =

FM radio frequency

The following radio stations broadcast on FM frequency 94.2 MHz:

== Indonesia ==
- Gema Surya FM in Ponorogo Regency

== China ==
- SZMG Shenzhen Life Radio in Shenzhen

== Malaysia ==
- Mix in Seremban and Negeri Sembilan
- Perak FM in Lenggong

== Nepal ==
- Radio Karnali Aawaj in Simikot

== New Zealand ==
- The Edge in Auckland

== Singapore ==
- Warna 94.2FM
