= Kalakkal Kaalai =

THR Raaga #OHHSOME Kalakkal Kalai with Hotlink
- Genre: Talk; Music
- Running time: Weekdays 6.00am - 10.00am
- Country of origin: Malaysia
- Language: Tamil
- Home station: THR Raaga
- Hosted by: Aanantha; Uthaya
- Recording studio: Bukit Jalil, Kuala Lumpur
- Original release: August 2006 - present
- Audio format: FM and Digital radio

Kalakkal Kalai, currently known as THR Raaga #OHHSOME Kalakkal Kalai with Hotlink due to sponsorship, is a Malaysian Tamil language breakfast radio show that airs on THR Raaga. The show were hosted by Aanantha and Uthaya with nearly 700,000 listener every day.

== The shows ==
- Guys-sa Girls-sa (English: Guys or Girl?) - Battle of the sexes – "it's war" between guys & girls! To win this battle just answer the questions correctly. The winning team get points added. Winner will walk away with some attractive prizes.
- Raagavil Yaar Ivar? (English: Who is him?) - A snippet of a tweaked voice of an artist will be played and all you have to do is to tell us who the artist is and you walk away with RM100 cash! Failing which the money will snowball.
- Ithu Eppadi Irukku (English: How is it?) - Prank call show
- Ulta Paatu - Aanantha and Uthaya will spoof a hot upbeat Tamil song. The song will be associated with current issues.
- Raagavil isshhhkk issshhhkk - Two mosquitos will humorously reenact on current issues.
- Konjem Yosingge Boss - Listener can win prize by answering the riddles and puzzle.
