= Red FM (Malaysia) =

Petaling Jaya; Malaysia
- Broadcast area: West Malaysia and Singapore
- Frequency: Varies depending on its region

Programming
- Language: English
- Format: Talk, contemporary hit radio

Ownership
- Owner: Star Media Group Berhad
- Sister stations: Capital FM 88.9; 988 FM; Suria FM

History
- First air date: 1 September 2001
- Last air date: 31 December 2015 (14 years, 121 days)

Links
- Website: www.red.fm (defunct)

Red FM was a Malaysian English language private radio station that used to broadcast across Peninsular Malaysia and Singapore. It was managed by Star Media Radio Group, a wholly owned subsidiary of Star Publications (M) Bhd. Red FM began broadcasting on 1 September 2001 and was one of Malaysia's top five English radio stations.

The station was targeted at urban and suburban listeners, playing selected music from the 1980s and 1990s as well as current favorites. The station, as of 2003, played pop and rock songs with a focus on R&B. In a 2015 listener survey done by GfK, Red FM had about 325,000 listeners per week, which shows expansion by 70%.

On 9 September 2016, satellite TV company Astro announced plans to acquire both Red FM and Capital FM from Star Radio for a price of RM42 million. Astro intended to rebrand and broadcast these two radio stations via on-air and online platforms after acquisition. The acquisition was completed on 30 December 2016 and these stations are now owned by Astro Radio and no longer branded as such. From 1 February 2017 until 2 October 2017, these stations broadcast test transmissions for the then-upcoming rebrand and the official website also stopped working. Red FM's frequencies are now used by Astro Radio's newest Muslim-oriented radio station, Zayan FM, starting 2 October 2017.

== History ==
The radio station originates back to 1949 as Rediffusion Malaysia by the first commercial cable-transmitted radio stations. In 1989, Arab-Malaysian Group acquired a 49% stake in Rediffusion. It changed its name to Rediffusion Cable Network in 1991. In 1996, FM transmission was launched as a trilingual service. In December 1997, REDI-FM 98.8 was relaunched as a full-fledged Chinese radio station, ending the monopoly of the government-owned Radio 5 (now Ai FM) as the only Chinese radio station in Malaysia. The frequency of Rediffusion was changed to 91.5 FM immediately, and it became a bilingual radio service. By the end of the year, cable transmission ceased. In 1999, the frequency was changed to 104.9 FM, but 91.5 FM was not taken over by any radio station, until 2001, when IKIM.FM (Malaysia's Islamic radio station) took over the previous FM slot and began broadcasting. In 2003, RED FM was acquired by Star Media Group Berhad. The current reincarnation was in 2008, when it dropped the 104.9 in the name RED 104.9 FM, to become RED FM only.

Starting from 2016, the radio station would remain active, albeit with the lack of radio shows and the public service announcements. News and traffic reports are unaffected. All of these have since stopped after the acquisition of this station by Astro Radio.

== Frequencies ==
=== Active ===
All frequencies are now taken over by Astro Radio's Zayan starting 2 October 2017.

- 104.9 MHz - Klang Valley
- 98.1 MHz - Perlis, Alor Setar, Kedah and Penang
- 106.4 MHz - Ipoh, Perak
- 98.9 MHz - Malacca
- 92.8 MHz - Johor Bahru, Johor and Singapore
- 91.6 MHz - Kuantan, Pahang

=== Defunct ===
- 98.2 MHz - Taiping, Perak, inactive since May 2009, then replaced by high TX 98.1 MHz from Gunung Jerai, Kedah.
- 106.0 MHz - Negeri Sembilan, inactive since June 2009, then replaced by high transmission power frequency from Gunung Ulu Kali, 104.9 MHz. FM 106.0 MHz is used by City Plus FM since November 2016.
- 103.3 MHz - Langkawi, Kedah, inactive since Feb 2001.
- 101.2 MHz Tapah, inactive since July 2000.
- 107.6 MHz - Penang, ceased transmission since 16 March 2014, then frequency slot was taken over by Capital FM on 17 March 2014 and FM 107.6 MHz is used by Go Xuan since 2 October 2017.

== See also ==
Other Rediffusion stations:

- Rediffusion
- Associated-Rediffusion
- Rediffusion Television (Hong Kong, now known as Asia Television)
- Starcom Network - formerly Radio Distribution (Barbados) Limited
- Rediffusion Singapore
