= TIME dotCom =

Malaysian telecommunications company

TIME dotCom Berhad
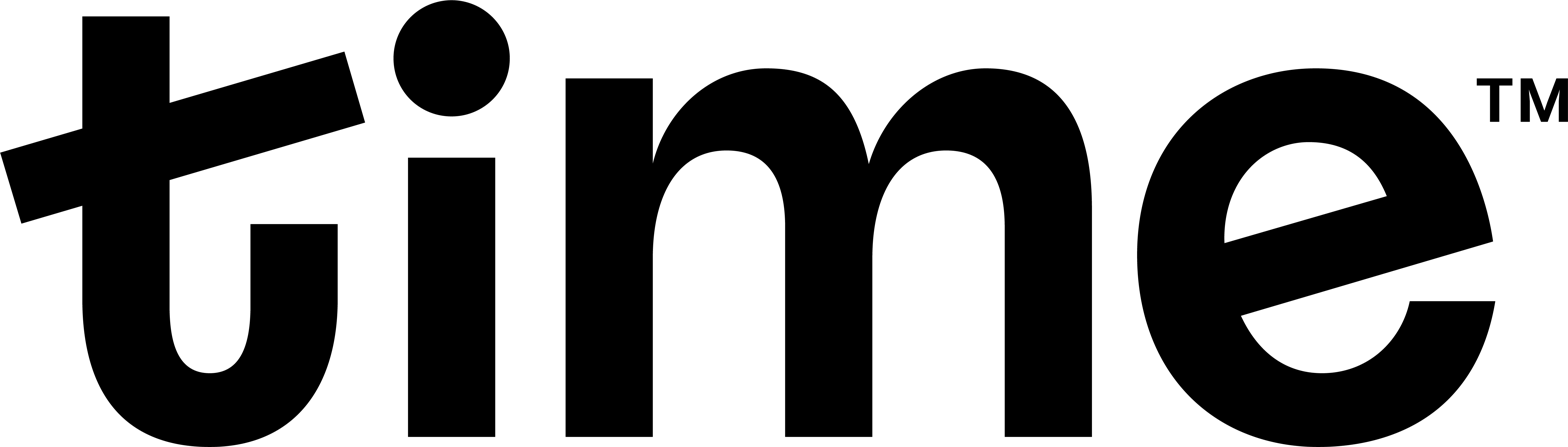
- Formerly: TIME Telecommunications Holdings Berhad (1996–2000)
- Type: Public
- Industry: Telecommunications; Technology; Multimedia
- Founded: October 25, 1996; 29 years ago
- Founder: Dato' Zaidan Hj. Othman
- Headquarters: Shah Alam, Selangor, Malaysia
- Area served: Nationwide
- Key people: Afzal Abdul Rahim (CEO)
- Brands: Emit Solar; Time Charge N Go
- Revenue: ▲RM373.59 million (2022)
- Net income: ▲RM118.28 million (2022)
- Owner: Khazanah Nasional
- Number of employees: 1290 (2023)
- Website: www.time.com.my

TIME dotCom Berhad (traded as TIME) is a Malaysian telecommunications company based in Shah Alam, Selangor. It specialises in domestic and international connectivity, cloud services, managed services and data centres. The company operates across ASEAN, in retail, enterprise, and wholesale markets.

The company's businesses are its fibre optic network assets that span Malaysia, Singapore, Thailand, Vietnam and Cambodia – countries in which it has an established operational presence. In 2024, the company moved into the renewable energy sector, launching Emit Solar for home solar solutions and acquiring Charge N Go, later renamed Time Charge N Go, to provide EV charging infrastructure.

== History ==
Established 25 October 1996 as TIME Telecommunications Holdings Berhad, the company was renamed TIME dotCom Berhad on 17 January 2000.

Through its many innovations and strategic acquisitions, the company has evolved into a regional telecommunications leader. In 2000, Khazanah Nasional acquired a 30% equity stake in the company. Time was listed on Bursa Malaysia a year later.

In 2006, Time secured one of two 3G licences from the Malaysian Communications and Multimedia Commission (MCMC). Their 3G licence was later sold to DiGi.

In the early 2000s, the company was a key player in boosting rural connectivity in Malaysia through its rollout of the National Universal Service Provision (USP) Project in 2006, in collaboration with the MCMC.

Afzal Abdul Rahim joined Time in 2008 as Chief Executive Officer. Appointed by Khazanah, he led the company’s recovery strategy starting with the sale of Time’s public telephone business to the prepaid fixed-line telephone company Paycomm for RM8.3 million. Within 1 year and for the first time in 6 years, Time was finally in the black.

On 31 March 2010, Time posted a profit run for the fourth consecutive quarter with a Profit After Tax (PAT) of RM18.8 million. Profit from operations improved to RM3.0 million against a loss in operations of RM2.8 million in the preceding year’s corresponding quarter.

The company went on to introduce the country’s first high-speed broadband, Time Fibre Broadband, in 2012, achieving speeds of up to 100Mbps. Malaysian financial newspaper The Edge reported that its 100% fibre optic network covered approximately 100,000 homes in the Klang Valley and Penang. This was achieved through fibre-to-the-home (FTTH), a broadband technology that employs optical fibres to supply high-speed internet and other digital services directly to individual buildings. Current speed plan offerings include 200Mbps, 600Mbps, 1Gbps and 2Gbps packages.

Time expanded its regional footprint in 2011, after the company’s minority shareholders approved a proposal to acquire four regional telecommunications companies valued at over RM322 million. Among others, it acquired stakes in companies such as Global Transit companies, which invests in submarine cables, and AIMS Group, which owns data centres. Time’s regional presence was further boosted through strategic investments in Vietnam's CMC and Thailand's Symphony, both telecommunications leaders in their respective markets.

In 2022, Time sold a 49% stake in AIMS Data Centre Business to US-based DigitalBridge Group to accelerate their data centre expansion plans across Asia.

== Networks ==
Time is the first telecommunications provider in Malaysia and only one of two providers in the world to achieve three of Metro Ethernet Forum's (MEF) headlining certifications for their network. These include MEF 3.0 certification in 2019, MEF 3.0 LSO Sonata certification in 2021 and MEF 3.0 SD-WAN certification in 2022, meeting rigorous standards in network performance, assurance and interoperability.

The company also operates a fully fiberised network, supported by the Cross Peninsular Cable System (CPCS) and investments in international submarine cables such as the Asia Pacific Gateway (APG), UNITY, FASTER, and Asia-Africa-Europe-1 (AAE-1). The latter is part of its wholesale segment which focuses on integrated solutions and regional connectivity services. These subsea and terrestrial cable networks provide connectivity across ASEAN and to the world.

Time worked with Google and four other Asian telecommunications companies including China Mobile International, China Telecom Global, KDDI and SingTel as partners in FASTER which went live in June 2016. The cable system has a total length of approximately 11,629 km and a capacity of 60Tb/s. Its network connects Los Angeles, Portland, San Francisco, Oregon and Seattle to Chikura and Shima in Japan.

Time also funded and owns a portion of the domestic submarine cable system Sistem Kabel Rakyat 1 Malaysia (SKR1M) in 2015. The initiative was part of the Malaysian government’s drive to boost the country’s high-speed broadband capacity. The 3700km optical fibre submarine cable system links up Cherating, Kota Kinabalu, Miri, Bintulu, Kuching and Mersing, connecting Peninsular Malaysia, Sabah and Sarawak. This technology was brought in to replace the ageing Malaysian Domestic Submarine Cable System (MDSCS) that had been operating since 1995.

== Business segments ==
The company provides a range of products and services for various market segments. Its retail segment offers high-speed broadband services for home connectivity needs, while its business SME division delivers solutions such as SME Internet, secure broadband, and backup-as-a-service to support small and medium enterprises.

In its enterprise segment, Time’s current range of services include connectivity, cloud solutions, data centres, cybersecurity, and other collaboration tools. Time acquired a majority stake in AVM Cloud Sdn Bhd in January 2021 to facilitate their expansion into cloud computing.

Expanding beyond telecommunications, Time entered the renewable energy sector through its subsidiaries Emit Solar, which focuses on solar energy solutions for landed residential properties, and Charge N Go, which provides EV charging infrastructure for businesses. Following its acquisition in 2024, the latter was renamed Time Charge N Go.
