= Astro Audio =

Malaysian radio network company

- Formerly: Airtime Management and Programming (1996–2002); AMP Radio Networks (2002–2012); Astro Radio Sdn Bhd (2012–2025)
- Type: Subsidiary
- Industry: Radio network; Broadcasting
- Founded: 16 September 1996; 29 years ago
- Founder: Ananda Krishnan
- Headquarters: All Asia Broadcast Centre, Technology Park Malaysia, Bukit Jalil, 57000 Kuala Lumpur, Malaysia
- Area served: Nationwide
- Owner: MEASAT Broadcast Network Systems
- Parent: Astro Malaysia Holdings
- Subsidiaries: DVR Player.Com
- Website: astroradio.com.my

Astro Audio Sdn Bhd (also called Astro Radio) (Formerly known as Airtime Management and Programming or simply AMP Radio Networks) is a Malaysian radio network company which operates radio broadcasting services and more since 1996. It is a wholly owned subsidiary of Astro Malaysia Holdings Berhad. Astro Radio owns and manages 13 private radio stations which are transmitted through the FM (frequency modulation) radio spectrum.

As of November 2024, Astro Audio still remains the number one and largest radio network company in Malaysia, with 72% of Peninsular Malaysians and 14.9 million listeners tuning in to its stations weekly, together with its Media Prima counterpart, Media Prima Audio (Kool FM, Fly FM, Eight FM, Hot FM and Molek FM), according to the GfK Radio Audience Measurement (RAM) Wave 2 in November 2024. Era being at top of the list with the most audience reach estimated at 4.8 million listeners, followed by Sinar and current ever-growing MY.

== History ==
Astro Radio began in 1996 as Airtime Management and Programming Sdn. Bhd.

Airtime Management and Programming Sdn. Bhd. (now AMP Radio Networks) operates eight terrestrial FM networks: Era FM, MY FM, Hitz FM, Mix FM, LiteFM, Sinar FM, Melody FM & THR.fm (now THR Raaga and THR Gegar). AMP broadcasts in four languages with 11.5 million Malaysians tuning in weekly.

AMP is the sole provider of 19 satellite radio services (which include the nine FM services and are available to all Astro subscribers in Malaysia and Brunei), and is the first South-East Asian broadcaster to utilize LIU (local insertion units) for local or regional advertisers and utilizes Dynamic RDS (Radio Data System) as a commercial tool. Internationally, AMP also had involvement in the growth of radio industries in India, Indonesia and China.

In 2012, as part of the expansion of its operations, Airtime Management and Programming Sdn. Bhd. became Astro Radio.

In October 2017, Astro Radio announced the launch of two new radio brands - goXuan FM and Zayan FM, intended for a new generation of listeners in the digital and social media space. Zayan is the first Malaysian radio brand for modern Muslims, and goXuan follows Gen Z trends. Astro Radio streams live entertainment content via its digital platforms all day. goXuan is visually led.

On 1 January 2018, Astro Radio dropped the suffix "FM" as part of the rebranding for all its 11 radio stations, to focus on digital platform and "drive talk ability and social engagement".

=== East Malaysia downsizing ===
Between October 2023 and January 2024, Astro Radio imposed cuts to local staffing in Sabah and Sarawak. Previously, transmitters carrying ERA, HITZ and MY were converted between 2010 and 2017 to full state-based operations, with local presenters and programming originating round-the-clock from Kuching and Kota Kinabalu.

Dedicated state feeds of HITZ and MY were closed permanently that October, and all of its transmitters reverted as relays from Bukit Jalil. The previous day, meanwhile, ERA Sabah and ERA Sarawak discontinued local continuity, however several local shows were transferred to Astro's Bukit Jalil headquarters in January 2024.

== Other brands ==
=== Raku ===
Astro Radio launched a radio and music streaming service platform known as Raku and then DVR Player in April 2015 through mobile and web. Raku is a short-form for Radio Aku (‘My Radio’ in Malay). Through Raku, Malaysians can stream millions of songs, videos and playlists curated by top local artistes including Yuna, Paper Plane Pursuit, Dasha Logan and many more. Users can also listen to more than 20 live radio stations through the free and premium versions of Raku. The application also provides local community updates such as articles, news, traffic, and sports. Raku is available in English, Malay, Mandarin and Tamil. However, Raku services were rebranded into the new Syok platform in 2019.

=== Syok ===
Astro Radio launched a multilingual entertainment and lifestyle platform known as Syok, stylized as SYOK in July 2019. The platform can allow users to listen to 26 Astro Radio brands (including the Direct-To-Home/DTH stations that are available on Astro TV) via live online streaming, listen to podcasts of all live radio and exclusive content, watch original short-form videos, read current articles, news and traffic updates and participate in contests.

== Stations ==
Station	Explanation	Language	Year of Launch	Astro Channel
Hitz	The latest English songs, focused on younger listeners. Rebranded, with a dot, in 2001. One of the first radio channels by AMP to be launched in 1996.	English	1996	852
Lite	The oldest and latest songs for mature listeners. It was previously known as Light & Easy. One of the first radio channels by AMP to be launched in 1996.	English	1996	854→
Mix	The station plays adult contemporary music from the 90s and now, targeting listeners between the ages of 25 and 39.	English	1996 (as an Astro-only audio channel), 1997 (as an FM radio station)	855
Era	The latest songs from domestic and international repertoire, focused on younger listeners. This radio station is the first private radio station, to be broadcast completely in Malay, after being dominated by government-owned radio station for years.	Malay	1996 (as an Astro-only audio channel), 1998 (as an FM radio station)	856
My	Chinese songs for all ages. Formerly known as Chuan Zhen Xin Qu Tai (傳真心曲台) during the early years of broadcast.	Chinese	1996 (as an Astro-only audio channel), 1998 (as an FM radio station)	853
Sinar	The oldest and latest songs from domestic and international repertoire, focused on mature listeners. Formerly known as Wirama Melayu during the early years of broadcast.	Malay	1998 (as an Astro-only audio channel) , 2004 (as an FM radio station)	857
THR Gegar	A Malay-language radio station targeting the East Coast area.	Malay	1994 (original, as THR), 2005 (acquisition)	863
Raaga	Astro Radio's only Tamil-language radio station, targeting the West Coast area.	Tamil	1994 (original, as THR), 2005 (acquisition)	859
Melody	The oldest and latest songs, focused on mature listeners.	Chinese	1998 (as an Astro-only audio channel), 2012 (as an FM radio station)	858
Go Xuan	The latest songs and digital-first Chinese entertainment, focused on young listeners.	Chinese	2017	877
Zayan	The latest songs from domestic and international repertoire, focused on modern and contemporary Muslim listeners.	Malay	2017	876

== Defunct radio stations ==
AMP changed its line-up, swapping two of its English FM brands, namely Classic Rock and TalkRadio, for ERA FM (Bahasa Malaysia) and MY FM (Chinese), respectively. Melody FM was launched on 15 August 2012 to replace XFM on FM and Astro.

Station	Explanation	Language	Year of Launch
Classic Rock	The oldest and latest songs from rock music. However, it continues to be broadcast on Astro and via online only.	English	1997
TalkRadio	News and talk radio show; ceased broadcasting in 1998	English	1997
XFM	Songs from Malaysian artists only, focused on younger listeners. However, it continues to be broadcast as an online station before ceased broadcasting in 2017	Malay	2004
Hitz Sabah	This radio station was discontinued on 1 October 2023 and its frequency was taken over by Hitz.	English	2010
Hitz Sarawak	This radio station was discontinued on 1 October 2023 and its frequency was taken over by Hitz.	English	2010
My Sabah	This radio station was discontinued on 1 October 2023 and its frequency was taken over by My.	Mandarin	2010
My Sarawak	This radio station was discontinued on 1 October 2023 and its frequency was taken over by My.	Mandarin	2010

== See also ==
- List of radio stations in Malaysia
- Media Prima Audio
