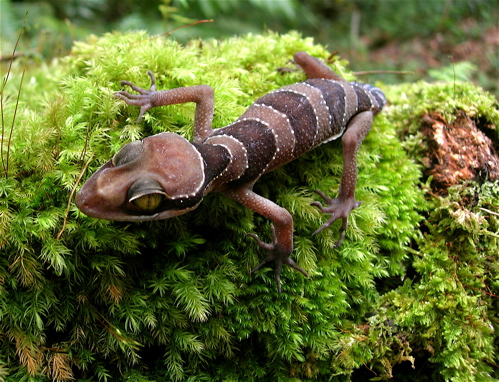

Scientific classification
- Kingdom: Animalia
- Phylum: Chordata
- Order: Squamata
- Suborder: Gekkota
- Family: Gekkonidae
- Genus: Cyrtodactylus
- Species: C. pulchellus

Binomial name
- Cyrtodactylus pulchellus Gray, 1827

Synonyms
- Cyrtodactylus abrae; Cyrtodactylus pulchella; Gymnodactylus pulchellus

= Malayan forest gecko =

Species of lizard

The Malayan forest gecko or banded bent-toed gecko (Cyrtodactylus pulchellus) is a species of gecko found in Southeast Asia.

== Description ==
Head large, much depressed, oviform; snout longer than the orbit, the diameter of which equals its distance from the ear-opening; forehead and loreal region concave; ear opening suboval, vertical, slightly oblique, one third to two fifths the diameter of the eye. Body and limbs rather elongate. Digits strong, slightly depressed at the base, strongly compressed in the remaining portion; the basal phalanx with well-developed transverse plates beneath. Head granular, with small round tubercles on the occipital and temporal regions, the granules enlarged on the snout, except in the frontal and loreal concavities. Rostral subquadrangular, nearly twice as broad as deep, with median cleft above, and entering the nostril to a considerable extent; the latter directed backward, pierced between the rostral, the first labial, and three or four nasals; 10 to 13 upper and 10 to 12 lower labials; mental triangular; two or three pairs of chin-shields, median largest and in contact behind the point of the mental; throat minutely granulate. Body and limbs above with small flat granules intermixed with small roundish, keeled, subtrihedral tubercles; a series of keeled tubercles from axilla to groin, limiting the abdominal region; ventral scales cycloid, imbricate, moderately large. Males with a longitudinal groove on the pubic region containing two parallel series of preanal pores, forming a right angle with a long series of femoral pores; altogether 18 to 20 pores on each side, 4 or 5 of which are in the groove. Tail cylindrical, tapering, above with small flat scales and annuli of feebly keeled tubercles, beneath with a series of large transverse plates. Light brown above, with broad chestnut-brown, light-edged cross bands, which are narrower than the interspaces between them; the anterior horseshoe-shaped, from eye to eye over the nape; the second crescent-shaped, on scapular region; three others on the body; tail with chestnut-brown complete annuli; lower surfaces dirty white. From snout to vent 4 inches; tail 5.

== Distribution ==
NE India (Bengal), Burma, Singapore, Thailand (Phatthalung, Trang, Nakhon Si Thammarat, Satun), Malay Peninsula, Penang, Pulau Langkawi & Perak. Cyrtodactylus abrae, found on the Cape York Peninsula and northern Queensland in Australia, is now considered a synonym.
