= Dendrobium erosum =

Scientific classification
- Kingdom: Plantae
- Clade: Tracheophytes
- Clade: Angiosperms
- Clade: Monocots
- Order: Asparagales
- Family: Orchidaceae
- Subfamily: Epidendroideae
- Genus: Dendrobium
- Species: D. erosum

Binomial name
- Dendrobium erosum Lindl., 1830

Synonyms
- Pedilonum erosum Blume; Callista erosa (Lindl.) Kuntze; Chromatotriccum aemulans (Schltr.) M.A.Clem. & D.L.Jones; Chromatotriccum erosum (Blume) D.L.Jones & M.A.Clem.; Dendrobium aegle Ridl.; Dendrobium aemulans Schltr. in K.M.Schumann & C.A.G.Lauterbach; Dendrobium amblyogenium Schltr.; Dendrobium inopinatum J.J.Sm.; Pedilonum aegle (Ridl.) Rauschert; Pedilonum aemulans (Schltr.) Rauschert; Pedilonum amblyogenium (Schltr.) Rauschert; Pedilonum inopinatum (J.J.Sm.) Rauschert; Chromatotriccum amblyogenium (Schltr.) M.A.Clem. & D.L.Jones

Species of orchid

Dendrobium erosum is a species of orchid of the genus Dendrobium. It is found in Southern Thailand, Malaysia, Sumatra, Java, Sulawesi, Papua and New Guinea, Vanuatu, and the Solomon Islands. It grows to a maximum size of 2.5 mm.
