= Astro cảm xúc =

Vietnamese satellite channel

Astro Cam Xúc was a Vietnamese satellite channel run as a joint venture with Ho Chi Minh City Television (HTV). The channel was launched in 2008 and first appeared on VCTV for six months. In 2013, media production company BHD stopped distributing Astro Cảm Xúc.
