= Bukit Larut =

Hill station in Larut, Matang and Selama, Perak, Malaysia

Bukit Larut Maxwell Hill
- Hill station
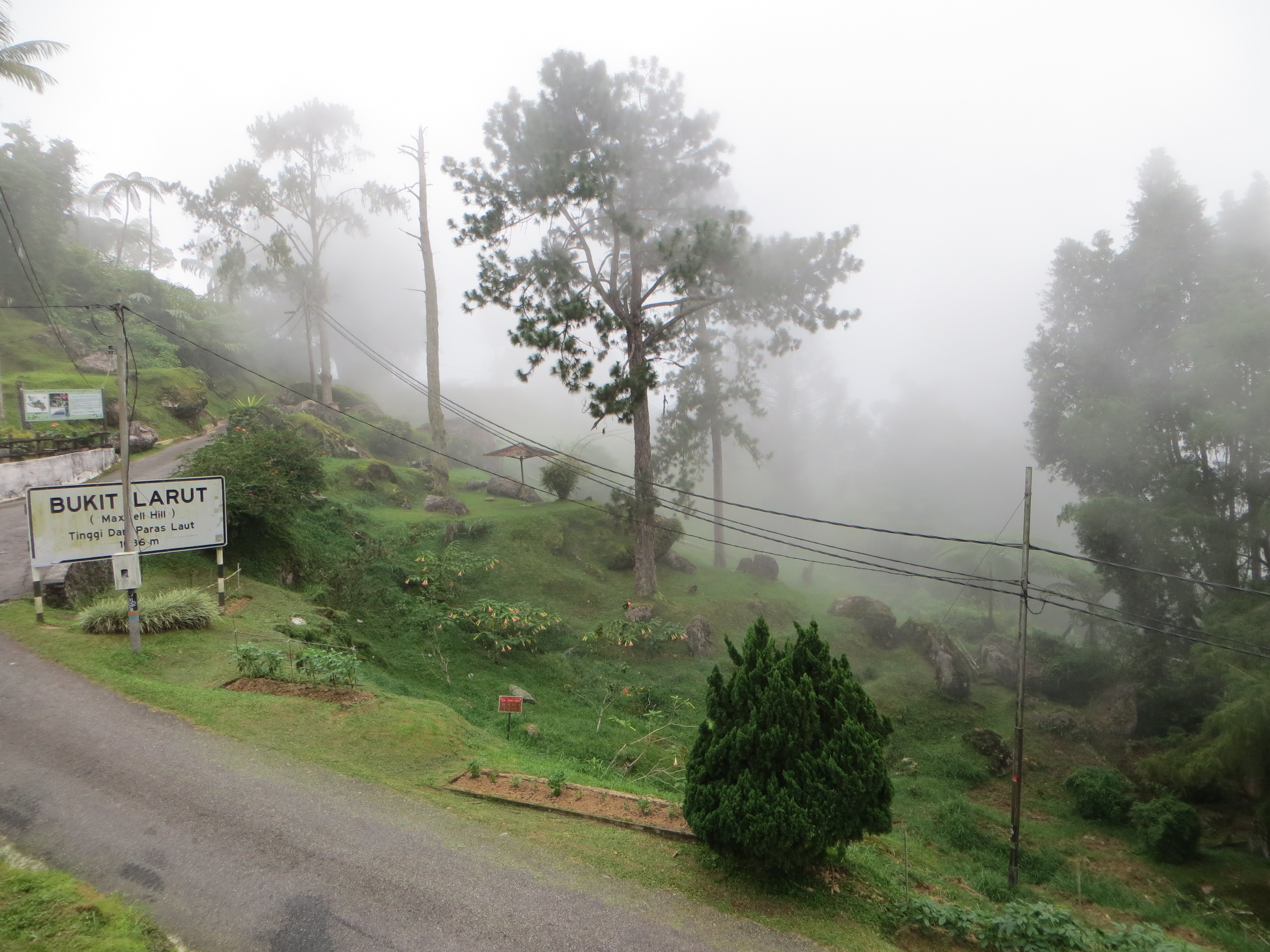
- Mist at Bukit Larut
- Etymology: "George Maxwell," a British Malaya administrator
- Location within Malaysia Location within Perak
- Coordinates: 4°51′44.28″N 100°47′34.8″E
- Country: Malaysia
- State: Perak
- District: Larut, Matang and Selama District
- Founded: 1884
- Renamed to Bukit Larut: 1979
- Elevation: 1,250 m (4,100 ft)

Population (2000)
  - Total: 2
- Time zone: UTC+08:00 (MST)
- Postcode: 34020
- Telephone area code: +6-05

Bukit Larut is a hill resort in Malaysia located in the state of Perak, Malaysia, 10 kilometres southwest from Taiping. It was established under the direction of British colonists in 1884 as a place of observation for tin mining activity and as a retreat for the English people who were based in nearby Larut and Taiping. The area was initially named Maxwell Hill after the British Malaya administrator George Maxwell, and was renamed as Bukit Larut in 1979.

Bukit Larut is rich in biodiversity. Bukit Larut is home to 621 highland plant species which accounts for 20.4% of the overall highland plant species found in Peninsular Malaysia, as well as 27 mammal, 227 bird, 9 reptile, and 56 amphibian species. The area receives the highest rainfall in Malaysia with precipitation reaching up to 5,800 millimetres (230 in) annually.

After a 1997 proposal to redevelop Bukit Larut with additional tourism facilities was opposed by the public, the government of Perak chose instead to renovate the old colonial-era bungalows and rest houses. Access to Bukit Larut's only road is restricted to four-wheel drive vehicle and foot travel due to the steep and narrow nature of the road. Damage to the road in a 2019 landslide blocked vehicle access until at least 2023, with repairs estimated at RM8 million. Bukit Larut is the location for the annual North Face Malaysia Mountain Trail Festival, which is a qualifier event for the Ultra-Trail du Mont-Blanc (UTMB).

== History ==
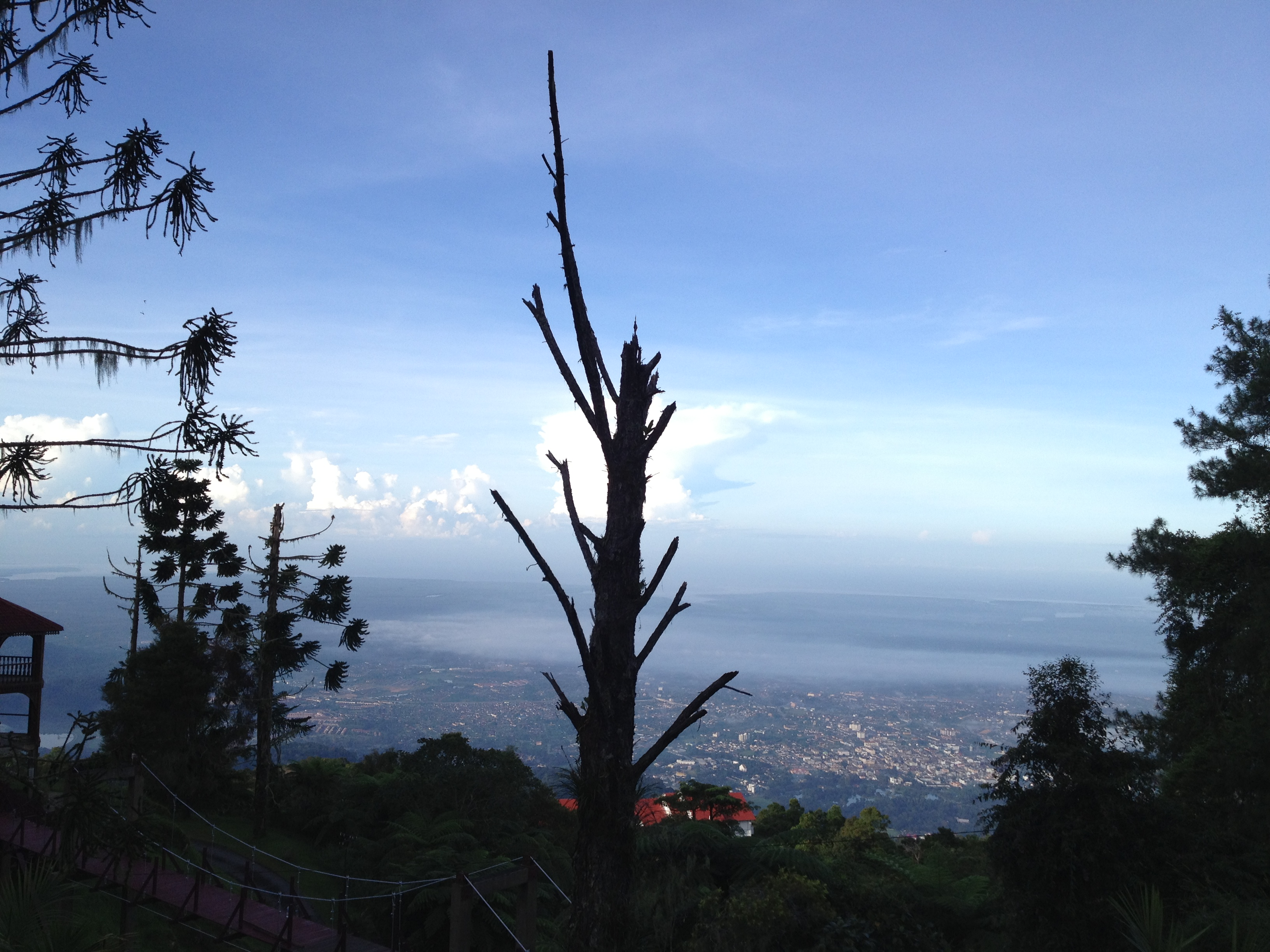
View of Taiping from Bukit Larut

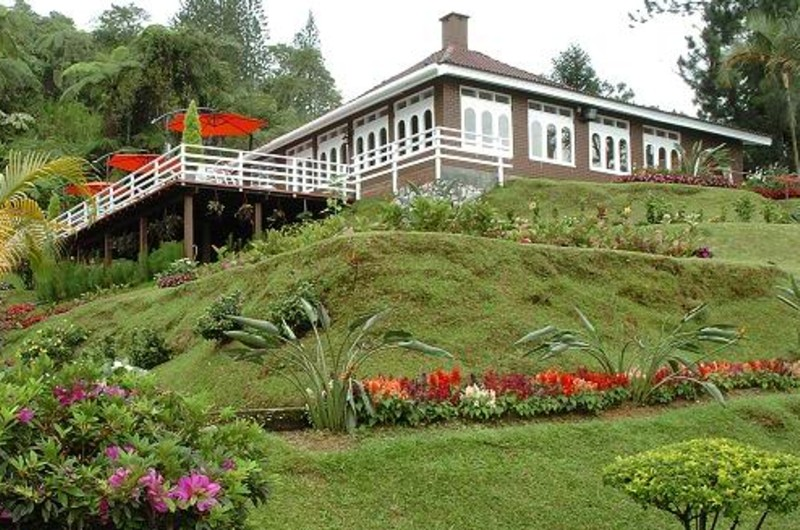
Cendana Bungalow (formerly The Hut) was built in 1889

Construction of the hill station took place in 1884 and the hill was named after George Maxwell, a British Malaya administrator. The first retreat bungalow, "The Cottage", was set up in 1884 for the Resident-General of Perak. The development was followed by the construction of Tempinis Bungalow (formerly Treacher Bungalow) and Cendana Bungalow (formerly The Hut), in 1880 and 1889, to accommodate visitors of Maxwell Hill. The Tea Garden constructed in 1887 used to be part of a tea plantation estate for Assam Tea prior to its end at an unspecified date. Maxwell Hill was renamed to Bukit Larut in 1979.

South Indian laborers and their descendants played a vital role in building and maintaining Bukit Larut (originally known as Maxwell Hill) in Taiping, Perak, since its establishment in 1884 till 1980's. Early generations worked on colonial infrastructure, transport, and tea estates, establishing deep generational roots on the mountain.

Sri Maha Kaaliamman Temple, Established in 1890 (also referred to as the Sri Kaliamman Hindu Temple) stands on the slopes. It is recognized as one of the highest and oldest estate temples in the region.

== Geography ==
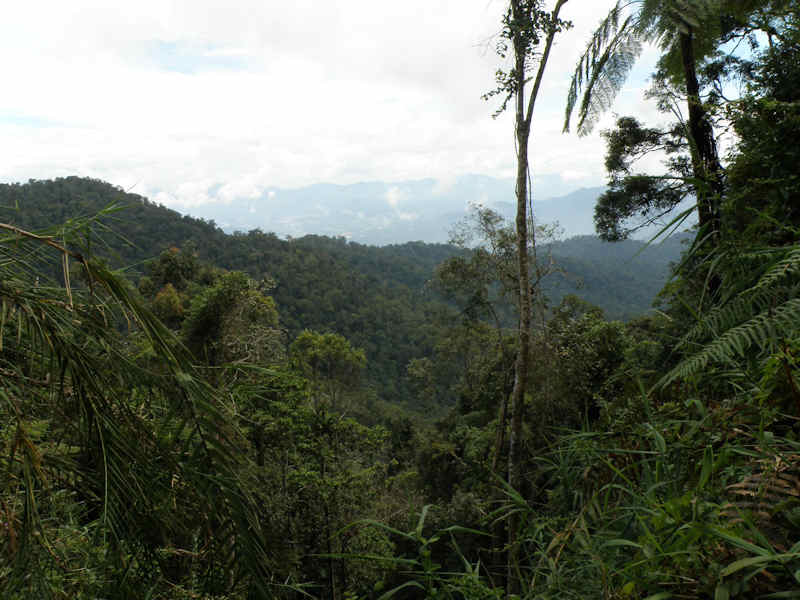
Bukit Larut forest

Bukit Larut is located on the Bintang Range in the northwestern section of Peninsular Malaysia. The area is mountainous where it consists of three peaks, with the highest peak being Gunung Hijau at 1,448 metres (4,751 ft), followed by Gunung Biong at 1,218 metres (3,996 ft) and Wray's Hill at 1,020 metres (3,350 ft). Due to the area being steep, it is not suitable for agricultural activities. The agricultural activities that were done in the past, such as tea and coffee planting, are now discontinued. The soil itself consists of granite, alluvium and organic deposits, with a high risk of erosion. Bukit Larut is an important water catchment area. Water quality from the area is generally good and contributes to the water supply in Larut, Matang and Selama District. Water from Bukit Larut mainly flows to three major rivers in the district: Sungai Jana, Sungai Ranting, and Sungai Air Terjun.

=== Climate ===
The temperature at Bukit Larut falls between 15 °C and 25 °C during the daytime, and at night can reach 10 °C. The location receives the highest rainfall in Malaysia, as the precipitation can reach up to 5,800 millimetres (230 in) annually.

Climate data for Bukit Larut (Maxwell Hill), elevation 1,037 m (3,402 ft)
Month	Jan	Feb	Mar	Apr	May	Jun	Jul	Aug	Sep	Oct	Nov	Dec	Year
Record high °C (°F)	28.6 (83.5)	29.3 (84.7)	31.3 (88.3)	28.4 (83.1)	30.1 (86.2)	29.8 (85.6)	28.6 (83.5)	29.0 (84.2)	28.6 (83.5)	28.6 (83.5)	29.5 (85.1)	28.2 (82.8)	31.3 (88.3)
Mean daily maximum °C (°F)	23.9 (75.0)	24.2 (75.6)	24.6 (76.3)	24.4 (75.9)	24.2 (75.6)	23.9 (75.0)	24.6 (76.3)	24.2 (75.6)	24.2 (75.6)	24.6 (76.3)	24.4 (75.9)	24.1 (75.4)	24.3 (75.7)
Mean daily minimum °C (°F)	17.3 (63.1)	17.6 (63.7)	17.7 (63.9)	17.8 (64.0)	18.1 (64.6)	18.0 (64.4)	17.8 (64.0)	18.2 (64.8)	18.2 (64.8)	18.4 (65.1)	18.3 (64.9)	17.7 (63.9)	17.9 (64.3)
Record low °C (°F)	12.4 (54.3)	11.2 (52.2)	12.3 (54.1)	13.2 (55.8)	12.2 (54.0)	12.7 (54.9)	12.6 (54.7)	13.0 (55.4)	14.0 (57.2)	14.0 (57.2)	14.0 (57.2)	13.1 (55.6)	11.2 (52.2)
Average precipitation mm (inches)	200.7 (7.90)	234.4 (9.23)	346.0 (13.62)	452.9 (17.83)	465.0 (18.31)	350.7 (13.81)	378.1 (14.89)	427.3 (16.82)	513.1 (20.20)	606.6 (23.88)	531.6 (20.93)	299.2 (11.78)	4,805.6 (189.2)
Average precipitation days	13	14	17	21	21	15	15	18	21	25	23	17	220
Average relative humidity (%) (at 14:00 MST)	82	83	84	87	87	85	83	82	85	86	87	84	85
Source 1: Malaysian Meteorological Department
Source 2: FAO

=== Biodiversity ===
Bukit Larut is known as a biodiversity hotspot in Peninsular Malaysia. As of 2000, 621 highland plant species that have been discovered in Bukit Larut, which account for 20.4% of the total highland plant species found in Peninsular Malaysia. Among the most popular plant groups found in Bukit Larut are Dicotyledons (410), Monocotyledons (192), ferns (14) and Gymnosperms (5). As of 1997, the IUCN Red List classified two plants, Dendrobium aegle and Liparis furcate, as vulnerable due to over-exploitation that could lead to potential extinction in the future. In addition, 12 tree species listed in WCMC World List of Threatened Trees are classified as threatened. Various lichens are also found to growing in Bukit Larut, with 22 different lichens have been identified.

Based on 2000 data, Bukit Larut houses 27 mammal, 227 bird and 9 reptile species, with one mammal species, the Indochinese tiger (Panthera tigris corbetti) classified as endangered by IUCN Red List. This accounts for 12.7% of mammals, 35% of birds and 4.2% of reptiles in Peninsular Malaysia. One study found 43 species of amphibians from 24 genera and seven families in Bukit Larut, which account for 40% of overall 107 amphibian species known to exist in Peninsular Malaysia.

The most common amphibian species families in Bukit Larut are true frogs (23.3%), fork-tongued frogs (18.6%), narrow-mouthed frogs (16.3%), shrub frogs (16.3%), goose frogs (11.6%), true toad (9.3%) and fish caecilians (4.7%). The number of amphibian species also increased from 36 in 2009 to 56 in 2011. Willemsella, a grasshopper under Acrididae and Hemiacridinae family which was not found in Peninsular Malaysia for many decades after 1934 has been observed in Bukit Larut since 2012 and suggests the widespread availability of this species following its rediscovery from Fraser's Hill. Some of the flower-visiting orthoptera such as Phaneroptera brevis and Youngia japonica were also discovered in Bukit Larut.

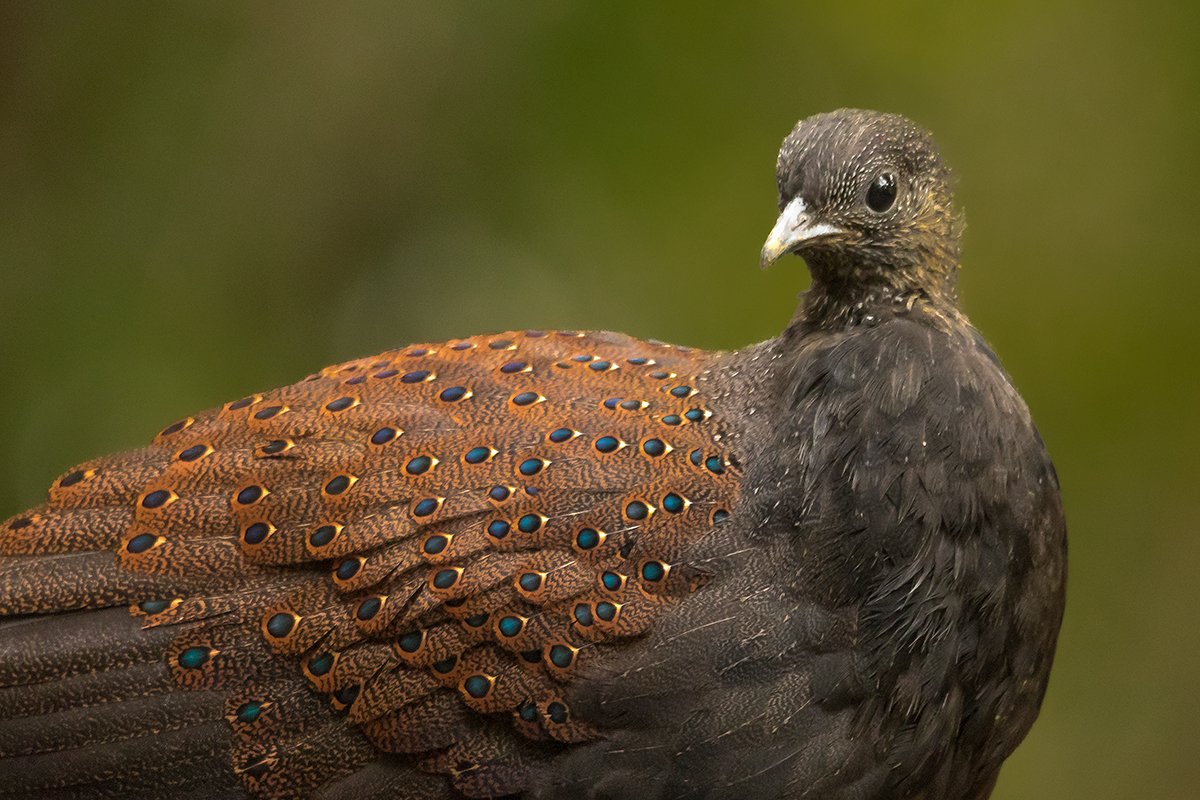
Mountain peacock-pheasant

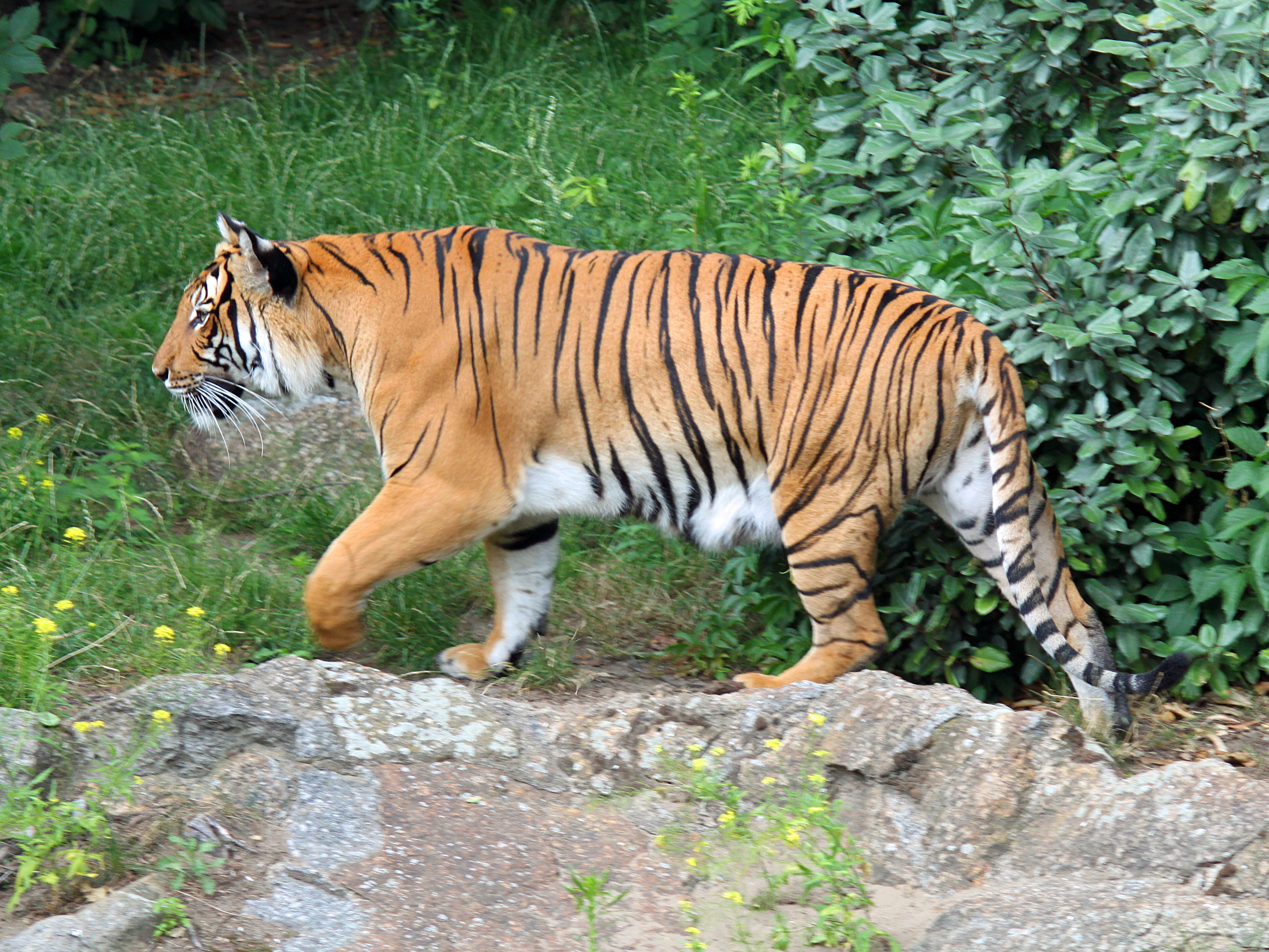
Indochinese tiger

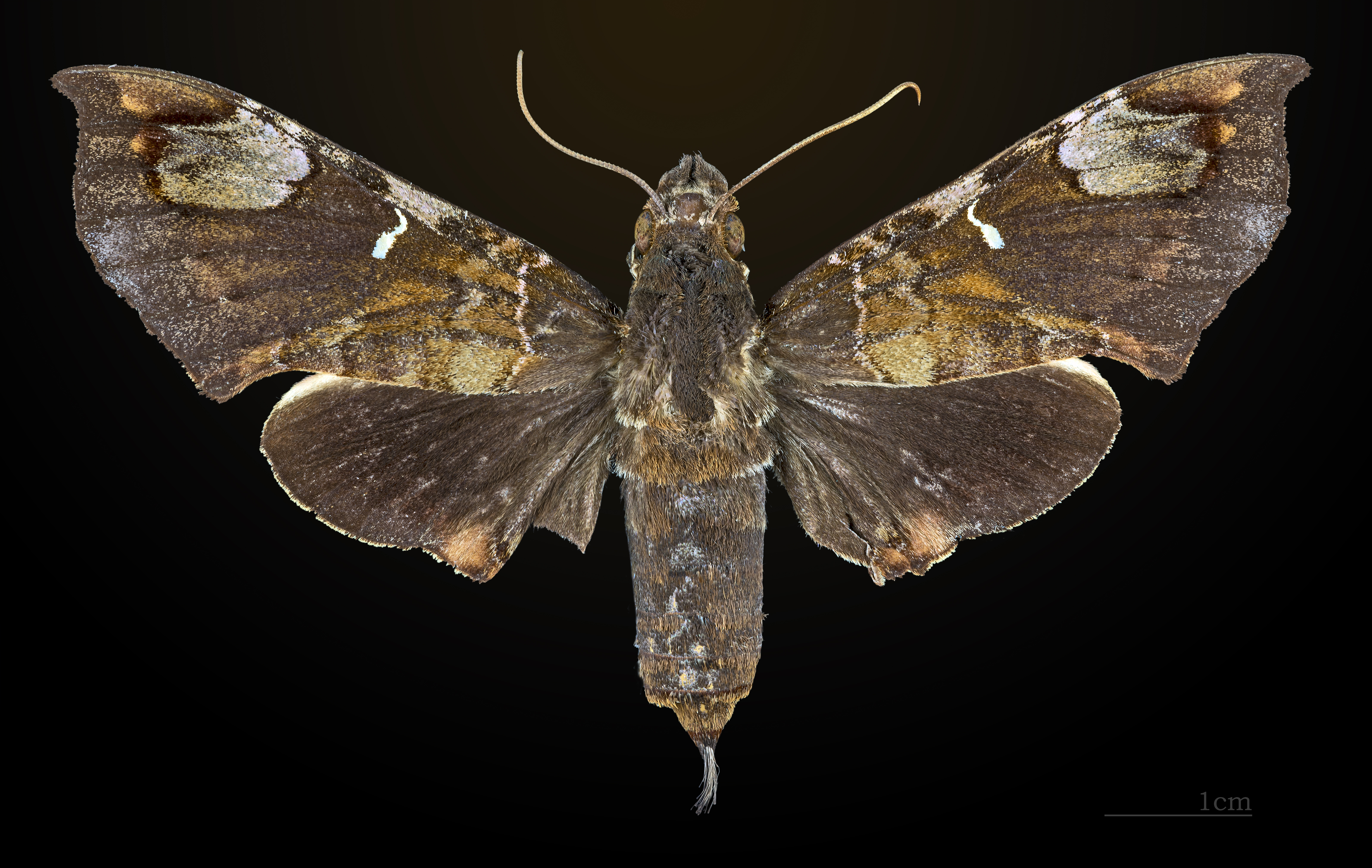
Giganteopalpus mirabilis

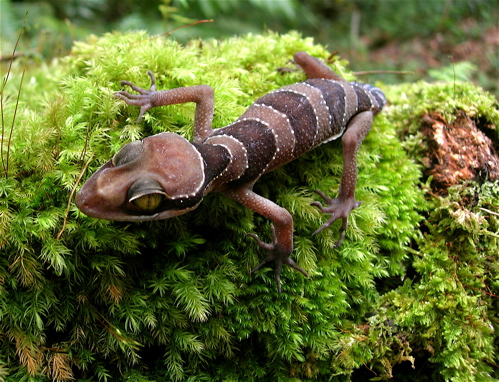
Cyrtodactylus pulchellus

== Transportation ==
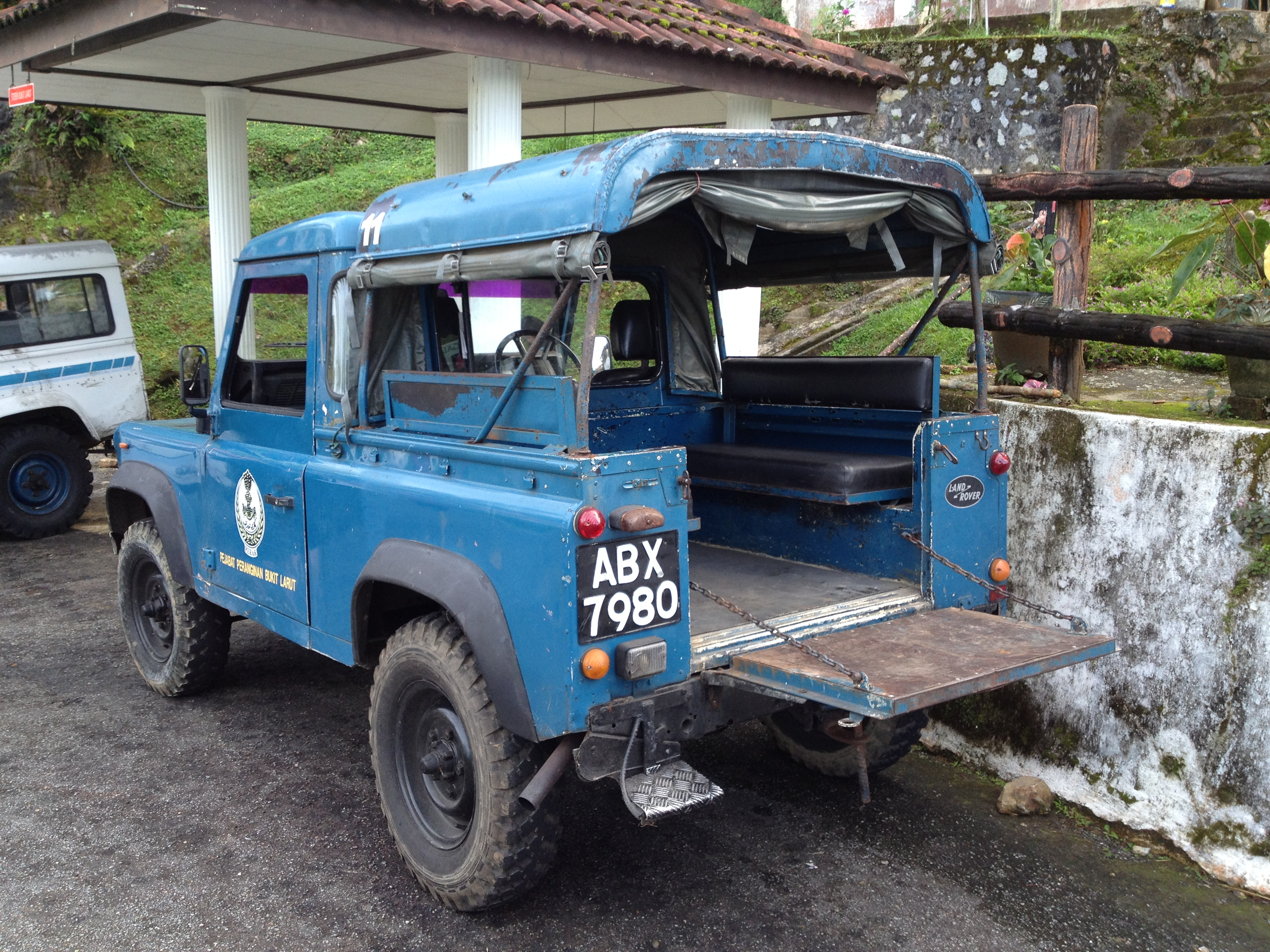
Land Rover four-wheel drive is the only vehicle allowed on its only access road

The summit is accessible only by a single-lane 13 km road that links Taiping and Bukit Larut. Due to the steep and narrow nature of the road, access is restricted to four-wheel drive vehicles and foot travel. The Larut, Matang and Selama District office provides passengers access to Bukit Larut with their Land Rover vehicles from 9 AM until 5 PM daily. The road is currently well-maintained by the Malaysian Public Works Department.

== Economy ==
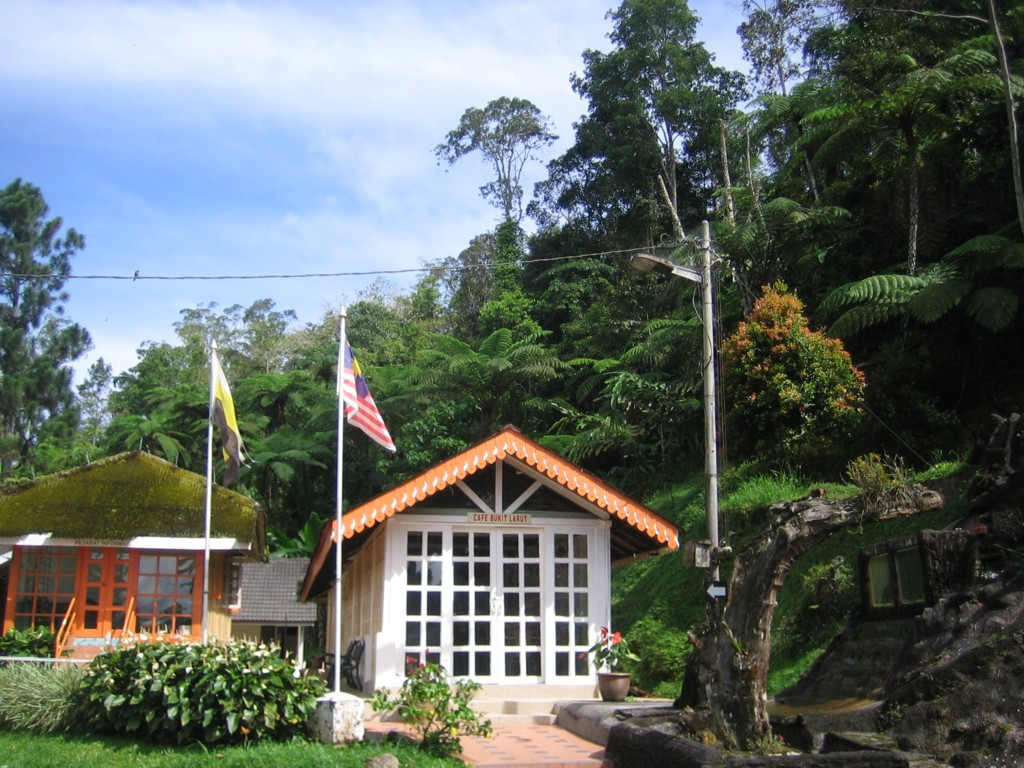
Restaurant in Bukit Larut

The economy of Bukit Larut is limited to tourism and hospitality, with accommodation services providing the main source of income. Accommodations for visitors mostly consist of colonial rest houses and bungalows. No high-rise hotels are available in the area. There are several workers who work in the public sector in Bukit Larut such as gardeners and drivers for district officers. Bukit Larut also has several food stalls, but the hawkers who operate in the area are not residents of Bukit Larut. Hawkers do not sell souvenirs or handicrafts. There is one restaurant operating on the hill which is located near the rest house.

Historically, Bukit Larut had coffee and tea plantations on an experimental basis, but these operation were discontinued due to the inflexibility of the transportation system. However, the Tea Garden House, which was previously part of the tea plantation area, continues to operate.

== Telecommunications ==
A radio transmitter belonging to Radio Televisyen Malaysia is located on Bukit Larut. It transmits radio and television signals to audiences in Perak for various channels, including Radio Televisyen Malaysia. Its coverage North Perak, Padang Rengas, Kuala Kangsar, parts of South Penang, parts of South Kedah (Kulim and Bandar Baharu) Central Perak, parts of South Perak, parts of Hilir Perak and parts of North Selangor.

== Sports ==
Bukit Larut is the site for an annual international trail running event, The North Face Malaysia Mountain Trail Festival. It is usually held in December and attracts more than 2,100 runners from 35 countries. The trail running event is certified by the International Trail Running Association (ITRA) and is listed as one of the qualifying races for the Ultra-Trail du Mont-Blanc (UTMB). A portion of the registration fees is channelled to the Bukit Larut tourism department for maintenance of Bukit Larut.
