= Mount Telapak Buruk =

Mountain in Negeri Sembilan, Malaysia

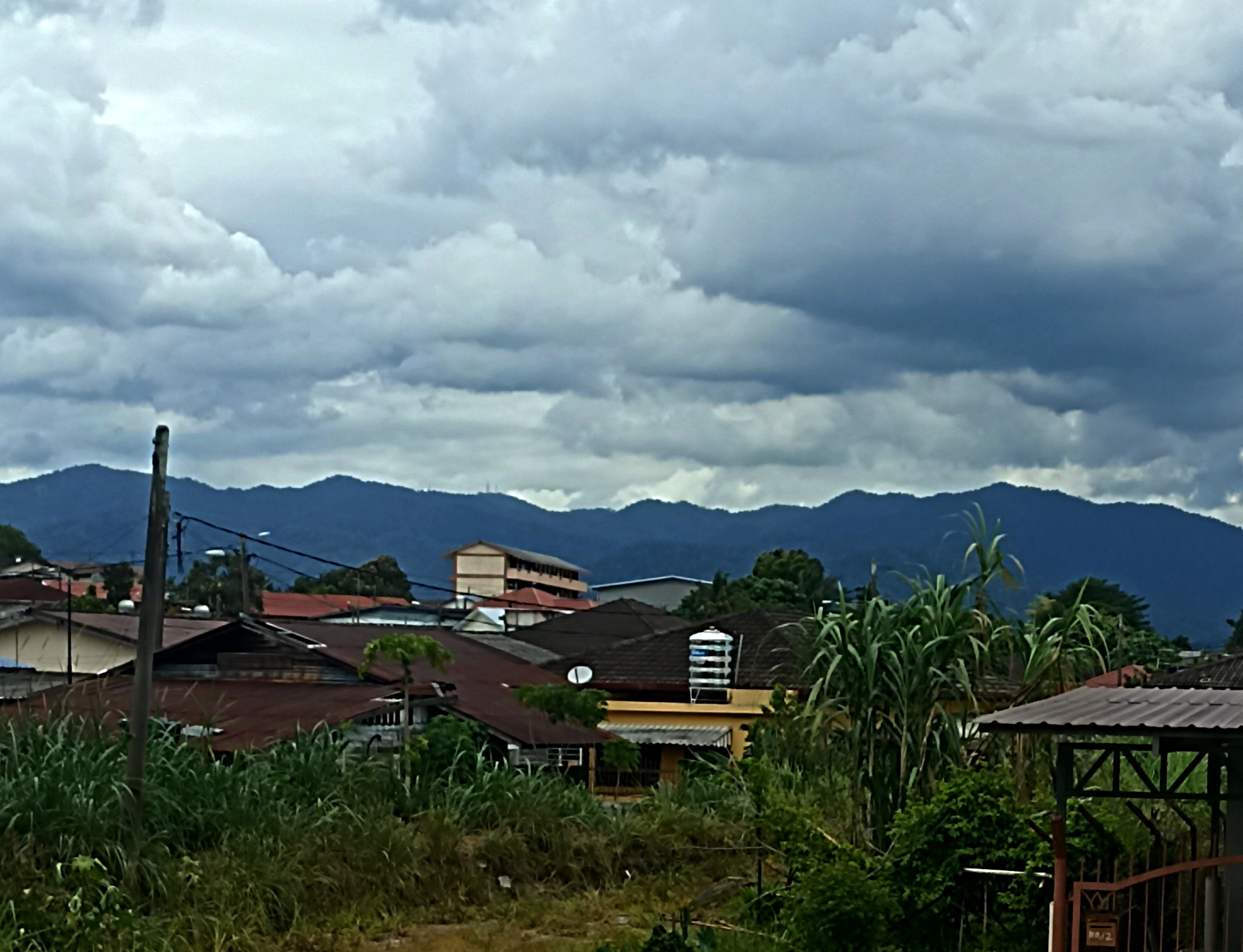
- The Telapak Buruk-Berembun massif as seen from Sikamat. Telapak Buruk is identifiable as a peak in the middle left, adorned with telecommunication towers complex.

Highest point
- Elevation: 1,193 m (3,914 ft)
- Listing: Ribu
- Coordinates: 2°50′27″N 102°04′10″E

Naming
- Native name: Gunung Telapak Buruk (Malay)

Geography
- Location within Malaysia
- Location: Jelebu and Seremban Districts, Negeri Sembilan
- Parent range: Titiwangsa Mountains

Climbing
- Easiest route: Hiking via Bukit Tangga off Federal Route FT 86

Mount Telapak Buruk (Malay: Gunung Telapak Buruk, Negeri Sembilan Malay: Gunung Tolapak Bughok; alternatively spelled as Telapak Burok or Telapa Buruk) is a mountain situated on the boundary between Jelebu and Seremban Districts in the Malaysian state of Negeri Sembilan. At an altitude of 1,193 metres above sea level, it is the third tallest mountain in Negeri Sembilan and the tallest mountain entirely within the state.

== Description ==
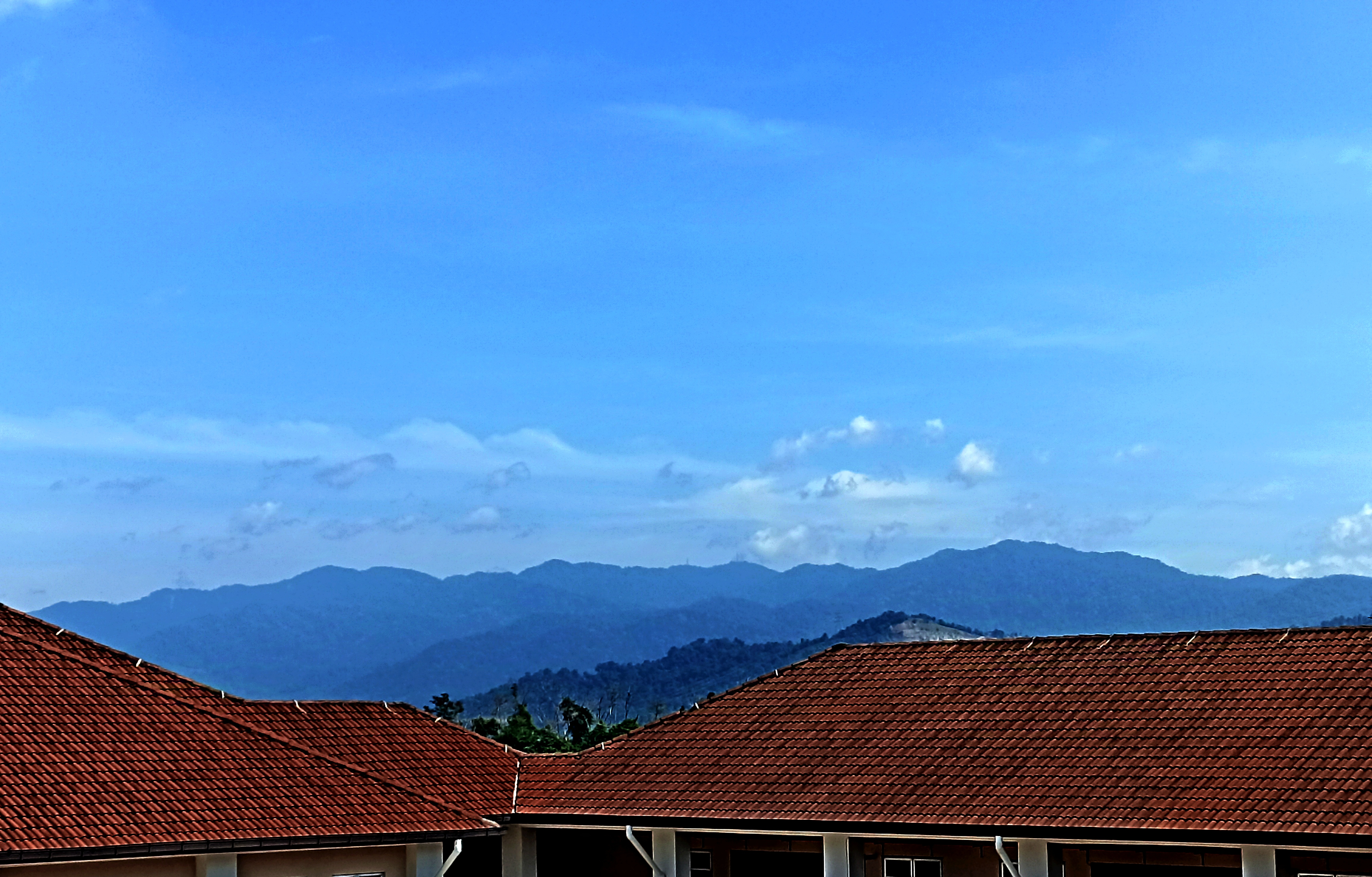
The Telapak Buruk-Berembun massif viewed from the suburban area of Forest Heights.

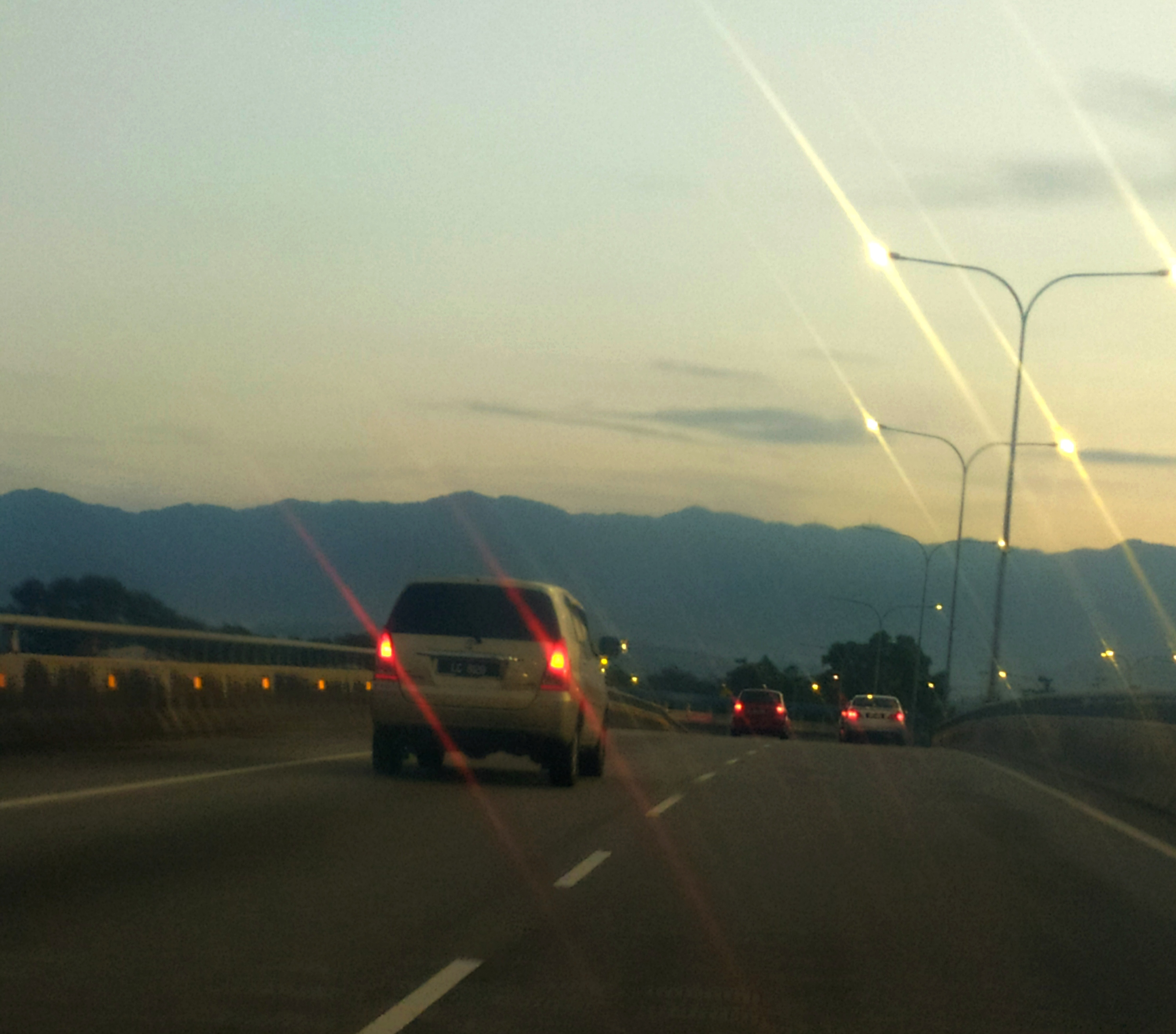
The massif as seen from the Seremban Inner Ring Road in Rahang.

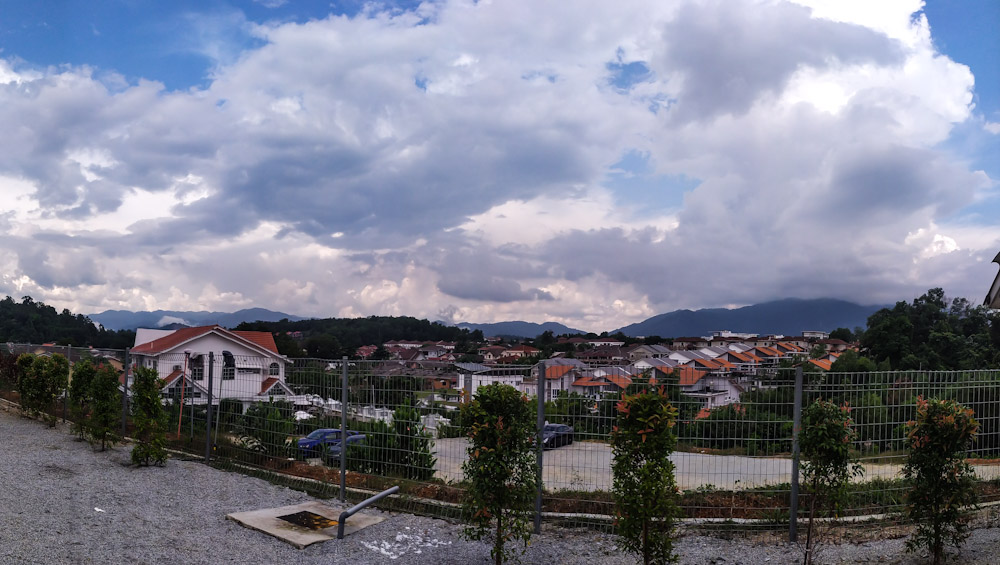
The Negri Titiwangsa seen from Senawang, with the massif situated towards the far left. Mount Angsi stands to the right of the image.

Mount Telapak Buruk is one of the many peaks that constitute a massif along the Negri Titiwangsa, the 92 km (57.1 mi) long southern tail of the Titiwangsa Mountains that runs from Kenaboi in the state's north to Tampin in the south, effectively separating Negeri Sembilan into eastern and western halves. Compared to the northern and central sections of the mountain range, mountains along the Negri Titiwangsa gradually reduces in elevation, ranging from its highest on Mount Besar Hantu at 1,462 metres (4,797 ft) in the north to 500–800 metres above sea level along the stretch from Genting Peras, a mountain pass on the border with Selangor, to Lenggeng. The massif indicates a sharp increase in elevation, with peaks averaging altitudes between 800 and 1000 metres and above, with Telapak Buruk being the highest point at 1,193 metres (3,914 ft). Mountains south of the massif regularly maintain a constant elevation between 700 and 900 metres above sea level, which include the peaks of Angsi, Datuk and Tampin. Two of Negeri Sembilan's major rivers, the Linggi and the Muar, have their sources within the massif.

Several peaks away to the south lies Mount Berembun, the state's fourth tallest, at 1,014 m (3,327 ft) on the border between Seremban and Kuala Pilah Districts.

== RAF B-24 Liberator crash site ==
The Telapak Buruk–Berembun massif is notable for its historical importance, being the final resting place of a British Royal Air Force (RAF) B-24 Liberator. Registered as KL654/R and nicknamed Snake, the bomber carrying an eight-man crew was reportedly crashed into the rainforests in the vicinity of both mountains on 23 August 1945, weeks before the end of the Second World War after taking off from its base on the Cocos Islands in a resupplying mission for the Force 136, killing all crew members.

Part of the wreckage of the ill-fated plane was found in 1996 by an Orang Asli before the 'official search' was carried out on 22 December 2006. On 29 August 2009, excavation works on the site uncovered 80 pieces of the crew's bones and their identification tags.

The site was officially commemorated in 2012. The remains of the fallen crew were handed to Capt. Kenneth Taylor of the British Armed Forces, and were laid to rest with full military honours in the Cheras War Cemetery, Kuala Lumpur on 18 October.

== Infrastructures ==
At the peak of the mountain stands a complex of telecommunication towers operated by TM, Maxis and CelcomDigi. Broadcasting areas cover the entirety of Seremban and Port Dickson Districts and northern Rembau District in Negeri Sembilan, Bera District in western Pahang and parts of southern Selangor such as Hulu Langat and Sepang Districts.

== See also ==
- List of mountains in Malaysia
