= Astro Malaysia Holdings =

Malaysian media company

Astro Malaysia Holdings Berhad
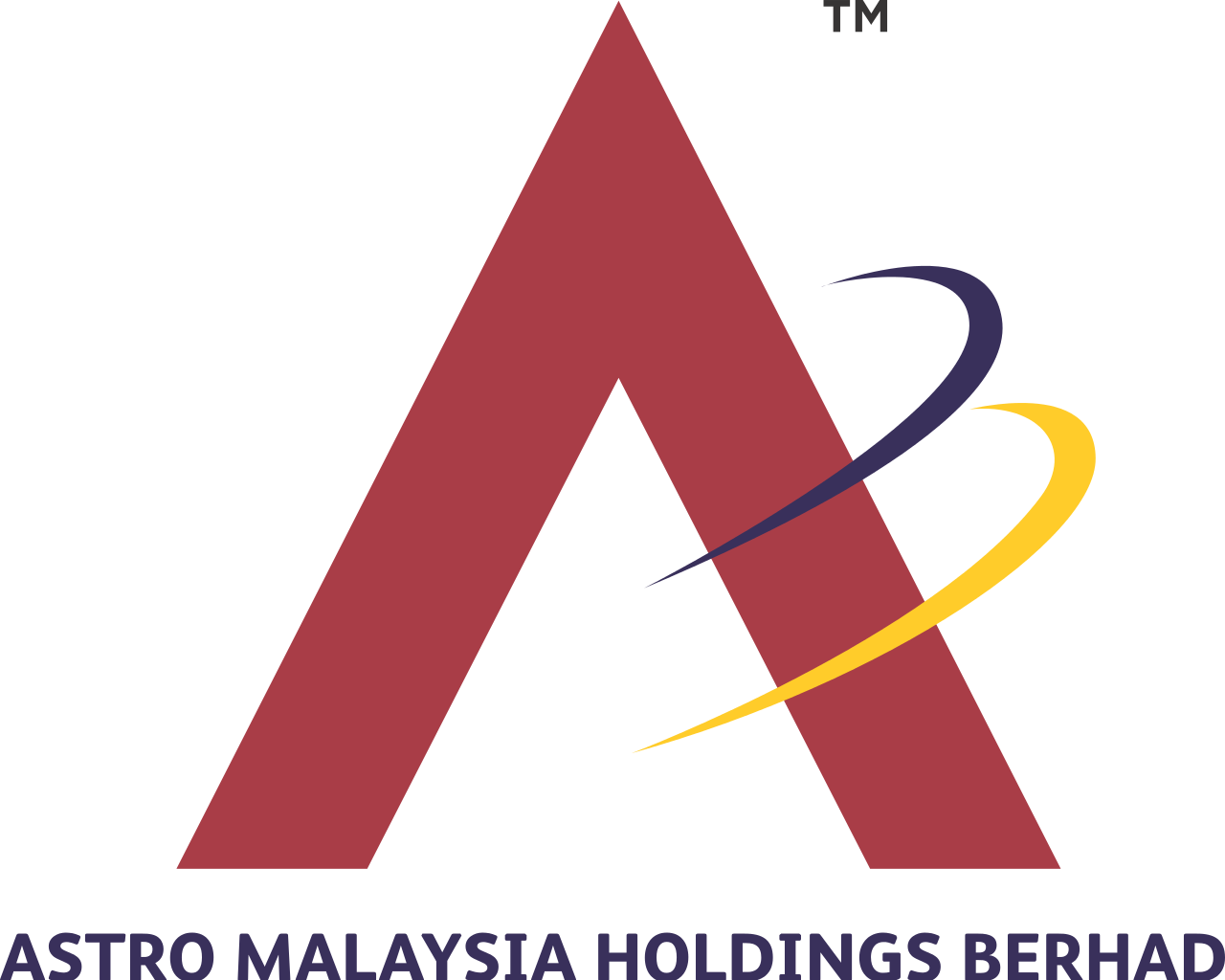
- Type: Public
- Traded as: MYX: 6399
- ISIN: MYL6399OO009
- Industry: Mass media
- Founded: 16 September 2003; 23 years ago
- Headquarters: All Asia Broadcast Centre (AABC), Taman Teknologi Malaysia, Bukit Jalil, 57000 Kuala Lumpur, Malaysia
- Area served: Worldwide
- Key people: Tunku Ali Redhauddin, Chairman; Euan Smith, CEO
- Products: Pay television Broadcasting; Publishing
- Revenue: ▼RM 2.79 billion (FY2026); ▼RM 3.8 billion (FY2023)
- Operating income: ▼RM 5.49 billion(2023); RM5.59 billion(2022)
- Total assets: ▲RM 5.7 billion(2023); RM 5.33 billion(2022)
- Total equity: ▼RM 1.07 billion(2023); RM 1.135 billion(2022)
- Number of employees: 2,887(2023)
- Subsidiaries: MEASAT Broadcast Network System; Astro Facilities; Astro Productions Services; Astro Retail Ventures; Astro Digital; Astro Entertainment; Astro Shaw; Astro Group Services; Astro GTS
- Website: corporate.astro.com.my

Astro Malaysia Holdings Berhad is a Malaysian media and entertainment holding company that began as a paid digital satellite radio and television service, Astro. The company is owned by Usaha Tegas Sdn. Bhd., which also owns Astro Overseas Limited. It serves 5.7 million homes or 72% of Malaysian TV households, 7,500 enterprises, 17.2 million weekly radio listeners (FM and digital), 14.7 million digital monthly unique visitors and 3.1 million shoppers across its TV, radio, digital and commerce platforms.

== History ==
On 1 June 1996, Astro Malaysia Holdings which was headquartered at Bukit Jalil, launched its own satellite subscription service. At the same time, the MEASAT satellite network began with the launch of MEASAT 1. The new pay-television service named Astro launched and started broadcasting with 22 television channels and 8 music channels. The launch of more MEASAT satellites from 1998 onward allowed Astro to begin expanding its services.

The company achieved the Multimedia Super Corridor status in year 1997. In 2003, it acquired Celestial Pictures. After two years, Astro bought an Indian radio station in Malaysia by the name of THR.fm. It also launched its first IPTV subscription service based on content licensed from Goal TV. It also bought Yes Television (Hong Kong) Limited and Goal TV Asia Limited to distribute broadband and television content in the region.

In 2006, Rohana Rozhan, CFO of AAAN, was elected as CEO of Astro Malaysia. On that same year, Astro launched Astro MAX, its first PVR service. In 2007, it launched its first VOD service, adding Hong Kong TVB dramas to the platform.

On 28 April 2008, Astro cảm xúc was launched in Vietnam as a joint venture with HTV. It was also picked up by Vietnam Cable Television to be carried nationally. On 14 June 2010, AAAN was delisted from the Main Market of Bursa Malaysia Securities following a successful takeover offer by Usaha Tegas Sdn Bhd. Thus, its company name was changed to Astro Holdings Sdn Bhd. In 2012, the company was listed again on Malaysia's stock market.

== Recent developments ==
For the financial year ended 31 January 2026 (FY2026), Astro reported a 51.1% decline in net profit to RM65.13 million, as revenue fell 9.1% to RM2.79 billion, weighed by weaker subscription and advertising income. Pay-TV residential average revenue per user declined to RM94.30 from RM98.50 in the prior financial year. The radio segment also underperformed, with revenue falling 17.7% to RM142 million and weekly listeners declining to 16.2 million from 17.1 million.

The group identified content piracy as its biggest ongoing threat and noted it continues to operate under a dual cost structure, balancing legacy pay-TV expenses with investment in digital and streaming platforms. Chief executive officer Euan Smith described Astro's evolution over the past decade from a satellite television operator into an integrated content and digital entertainment platform.

== Subsidiaries ==
- Measat Broadcast Network Systems Sdn. Bhd. (Astro Malaysia)
  - NJOI
  - Sooka
- Astro Overseas Limited
  - Celestial Pictures
- Astro Audio
  - Syok
- Astro Shaw
  - Tayangan Unggul
- Fetch TV
- Rocketfuel Entertainment
- Astro Studios
