= Mount Pulai =

Inselberg in Johor, Malaysia

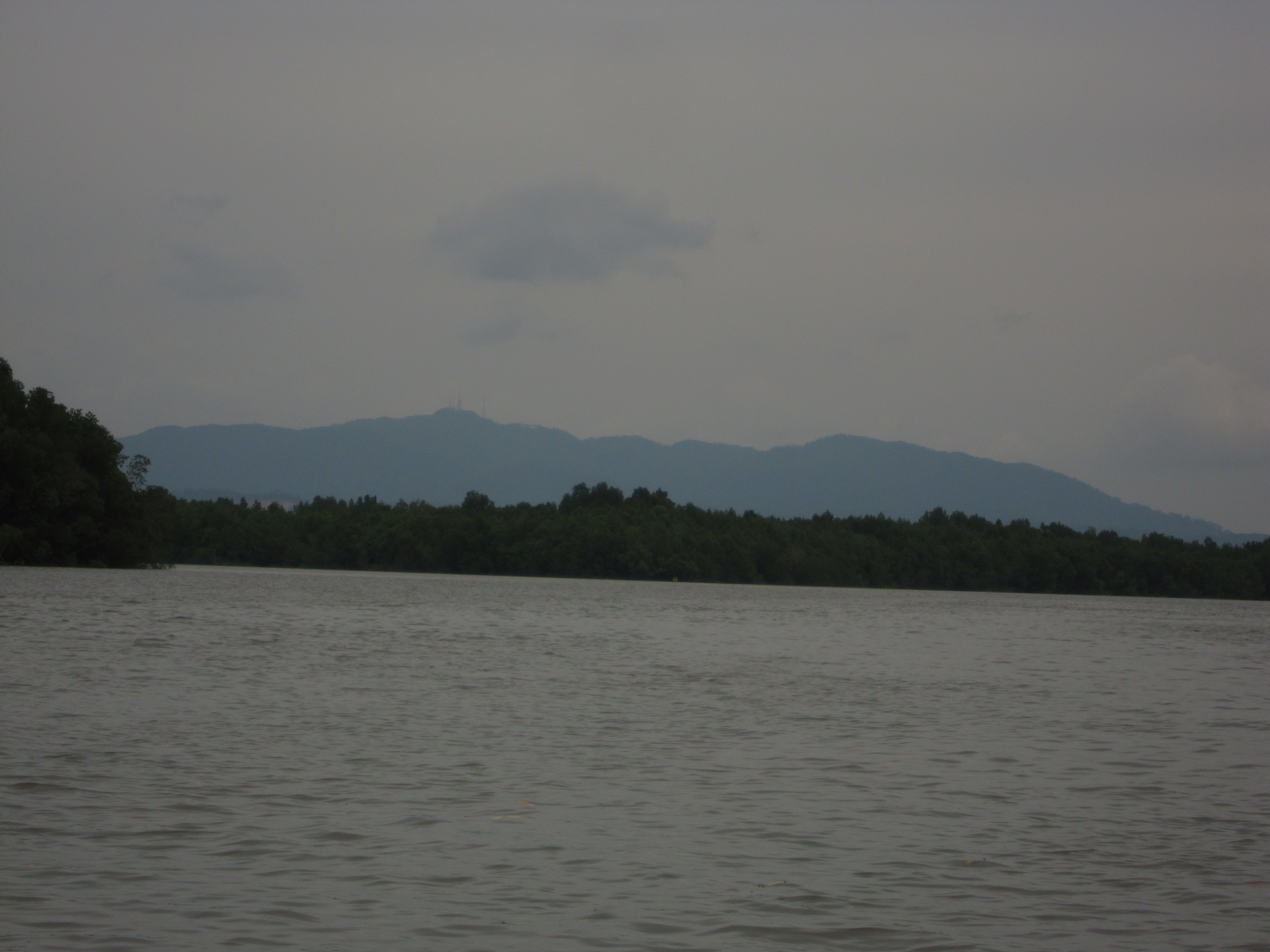
- Mount Pulai from the Pulai River

Highest point
- Elevation: 654 m (2,146 ft)
- Coordinates: 01°36′10″N 103°32′45″E

Naming
- Native name: Gunung Pulai

Geography
- Location: Kulai District, Johor

Geology
- Mountain type: Inselberg

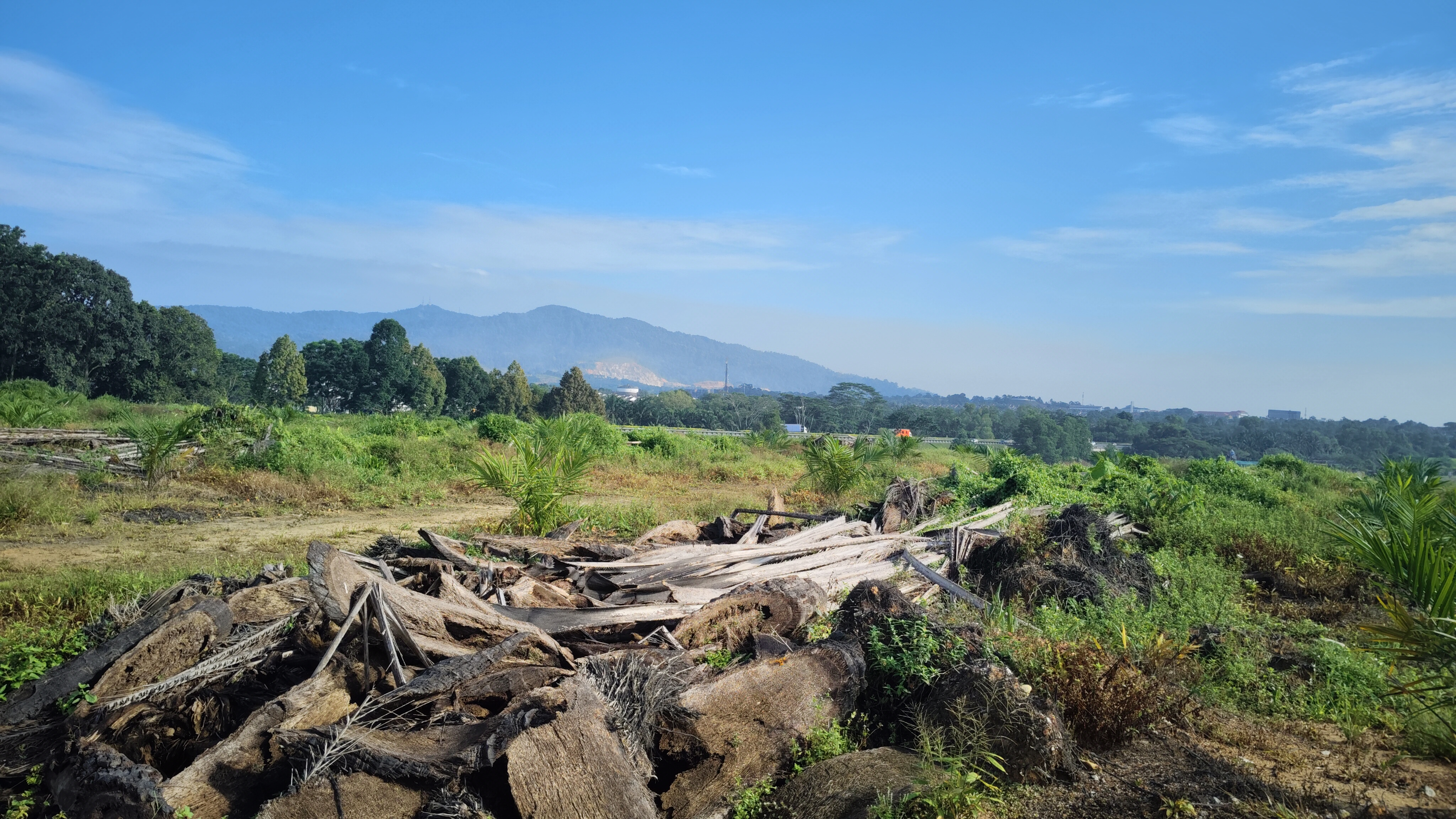
As seen from Kangkar Pulai

Mount Pulai (Malay: Gunung Pulai) is located in the district of Kulai, Johor, Malaysia.

== History ==
=== World War II ===
During World War II, Mount Pulai served as the British Commonwealth armies stronghold against the invading Japanese Imperial Army. There are still remnants of a fortress, rails, tunnels, an aircraft landing site and wells deep in the forest. There are initiatives by non-governmental organizations to reintroduce Mount Pulai as a jungle war memorial to educate people on the story of the mount during World War II.

=== Closure of Gunung Pulai ===
Mount Pulai is the source of the Pulai River which flows through the districts of Kulai, Johor Bahru and Pontian. Excessive mining activities on the foot of the mountain by a Chinese mineral mining company has destroyed the natural landscape of the area. Local villagers in the vicinity of the mountain reported up to 75 floods between 1986 and 2021. The most notable mud flood occurred on 26 December 2001 which resulted in 5 fatalities and the destruction of 4 houses. Consequently, the mountain had been closed for visitors between 2001 and 2015, when the Mount Pulai Recreational Forest 1 reopened.

== Attractions ==
The mountain features the Pulai Waterfall and 2 trails within the Mount Pulai Recreational Forest.

== Infrastructure ==
The mountain houses three telecommunication towers. Two are located at the peak of the mountain and another one is located slightly lower from the peak. The mountain is highly visible from buildings in Singapore, particularly in the northern and western parts of the country. It is the closest "true" mountain to Singapore at roughly 25 kilometres (16 miles) to 35 kilometres (22 miles) away, excluding Bukit Timah Hill, which is located within Singaporean territory.

== See also ==
- Geography of Malaysia
  - List of mountains in Malaysia
  - Protected areas of Johor
