= Digital television transition =

Global switchover to digital television

Map of digital terrestrial television broadcasting systems by country, as of 2024.

World map of digital television transition progress: Transition completed; all analogue signals terminated; Transition partially or almost completed; most or some analogue signals terminated; Transition in progress; broadcasting both analogue and digital signals; Transition in early stages; No information available

The digital television transition, also called the digital switchover (DSO), the analogue switch/sign-off (ASO), the digital migration, or the analogue shutdown, is the process in which older analogue television broadcasting technology is converted to and replaced by digital television. Conducted by individual nations on different schedules, this primarily involves the conversion of analogue terrestrial television broadcasting infrastructure to digital terrestrial television (DTT), a major benefit being extra frequencies on the radio spectrum and lower broadcasting costs, as well as improved viewing qualities for consumers.

The transition to digital television is happening at different paces around the world. Although digital satellite television is now commonplace, the switch to digital cable and terrestrial television has taken longer.

The transition may also involve analogue cable conversion to digital cable or Internet Protocol television, as well as analogue to digital satellite television. Transition of land based broadcasting had begun in some countries around 2000. By contrast, transition of satellite television systems was well underway or completed in many countries by this time. It is an involved process because the existing analogue television receivers owned by viewers cannot receive digital broadcasts; viewers must either purchase new digital TVs, or digital converter boxes which have a digital tuner and change the digital signal to an analogue signal or some other form of a digital signal (i.e. HDMI) which can be received on the older TV. Usually during a transition, a simulcast service is operated where a broadcast is made available to viewers in both analogue and digital at the same time. As digital becomes more popular, it is expected that the existing analogue services will be removed. In most places this has already happened, where a broadcaster has offered incentives to viewers to encourage them to switch to digital. Government intervention usually involves providing some funding for broadcasters and, in some cases, monetary relief to viewers, to enable a switchover to happen by a given deadline. In addition, governments can also have a say with the broadcasters as to what digital standard to adopt – either DVB-T2 or ATSC. Governments can also require all receiving equipment sold in a country to support the necessary digital 'tuner'.

Before digital television, PAL and NTSC were used for both video processing within TV stations and for broadcasting to viewers. Because of this, the switchover process may also include the adoption of digital equipment using serial digital interface (SDI) on TV stations, replacing analogue PAL or NTSC component or composite video equipment. Digital broadcasting standards are only used to broadcast video to viewers; Digital TV stations usually use SDI irrespective of broadcast standard, although it might be possible for a station still using analogue equipment to convert its signal to digital before it is broadcast, or for a station to use digital equipment but convert the signal to analogue for broadcasting, or they may have a mix of both digital and analogue equipment. Digital TV signals require less transmission power to be broadcast and received satisfactorily.

The switchover process is being accomplished on different schedules in different countries; in some countries it is being implemented in stages as in Australia, Greece, India or Mexico, where each region has a separate date to switch off. In others, the whole country switches on one date, such as the Netherlands. On 3 August 2003, Germany became the first country in the world to fully switch off terrestrial analogue signals.

The major terrestrial broadcast standards are DVB-T/T2 (Europe and most of Africa and Oceania), ATSC 1/3.0 (North America and South Korea), DTMB (China, Pakistan, and two other countries), and ISDB/Tb (two incompatible variations used in Japan and much of South America).

== Background and timeline ==
=== Transition dates ===
- 1996: Netherlands (satellite services)
- 1998: United Kingdom (digital terrestrial service)
- 1999: Russia (satellite services)
- 2001: United Kingdom/Ireland (satellite services), Malaysia (cable television)
- 2002: Denmark (Faroe Islands), Malaysia (satellite services), Albania (satellite services), Norway (satellite services)
- 2003: Germany
- 2004: Sweden (satellite services), Indonesia (cable television)
- 2005: Italy (satellite services), Indonesia (satellite services)
- 2006: Turkey (satellite services), China (satellite services), Luxembourg, Netherlands
- 2007: Finland, Andorra, Sweden, Switzerland
- 2008: Belgium (Flanders)
- 2009: United States (full power stations and satellite services), United Kingdom (Isle of Man), Denmark, Norway
- 2010: Belgium (Wallonia), Croatia, Estonia, United Kingdom (Guernsey, Jersey and Wales), Japan (northeastern Ishikawa Prefecture only), Latvia, Luxembourg (cable television and satellite), San Marino, Slovenia, Spain
- 2011: Austria, Canada (major markets), Cyprus, France, Israel, Japan (except 2011 Tōhoku earthquake-affected prefectures), Malta, Monaco, United Kingdom (Scotland)
- 2012: Czech Republic, Germany (satellite services), Ireland (terrestrial), Italy, Japan (Fukushima, Iwate, Miyagi), Lithuania, Saudi Arabia, Qatar, United Arab Emirates, Jordan, Bahrain, Portugal, Slovakia, South Korea, Taiwan, United Kingdom (England, Gibraltar and Northern Ireland), Vatican City
- 2013: Australia (including Christmas Island, Cocos (Keeling) Islands, Norfolk Island), Azerbaijan, Bulgaria, Hungary, North Macedonia, Mauritius, New Zealand, Poland, United Kingdom (cable television)
- 2014: Serbia, Iceland, Namibia, Algeria
- 2015: Belarus, Brunei, Greece, Iran, Morocco (UHF band), Mexico, Moldova, Romania (UHF band), Rwanda, Kenya, Uganda, Ghana, Tunisia, Armenia, Georgia, United States (class A low-power stations), Mongolia, China (full power stations)
- 2016: United Kingdom (Bermuda), Brazil (Federal District and the city of Rio Verde, Goiás), China (CCTV), Burundi
- 2017: Brazil (a few metropolitan areas, such as São Paulo and Rio de Janeiro, among others), Philippines (Light Network), Romania (phase 2), Germany Unitymedia, Kyrgyzstan, Brunei
- 2018: United States (cable television), Brazil (major markets, including all markets in Rio de Janeiro, São Paulo states), Romania (VHF band), Russia (first two multiplex channels) (Tver Region), Thailand (most channels), Ukraine (most channels), Uzbekistan, Philippines (RJ TV/2nd Avenue and Hope Channel Philippines)
- 2019: Ireland (cable television), Russia (first two multiplex channels) (more regions), Northern Cyprus, Singapore, India (phase one), Moldova (Transnistria), Bhutan (cable television), Costa Rica, Malaysia (terrestrial), Philippines (ETC/SBN 21)
- 2020: Brazil (other markets), Morocco (VHF band), China (Hong Kong), Thailand (Channel 3), Venezuela, Moldova (other territories), Sudan, Côte d'Ivoire, Indonesia (terrestrial and the entire 34 provinces), Vietnam, Pakistan, Senegal, Seychelles, South Africa, Sweden (Com Hem's) led by Ana Alonso
- 2021: China (regional stations), United States (low-power stations except in Alaska), India (phase two), Kazakhstan, Paraguay, Panama (Panamá, Colón and Panamá Oeste)
- 2022: Botswana (remaining localities), Canada (remaining markets), Indonesia (final terrestrial) (Batam and major cities on the island of Java), Philippines (BEAM TV and SMNI), United States (low-power stations in Alaska)
- 2023: Cambodia (remaining markets), Jamaica, Pakistan, Philippines (CLTV 36), India (last phase), China (Macau) (terrestrial), Indonesia (rest of the country)
- 2024: Brazil (except Rio Grande do Sul, major satellite channels), Chile, Cuba, Dominican Republic, El Salvador, Paraguay (Asunción), South Africa
- 2025: Brazil (remaining areas, satellite services), South Africa, Peru (Lima and Callao), Macau (cable television), Bosnia and Herzegovina, Philippines (UNTV)
- 2026: Argentina, Trinidad and Tobago, Bolivia (La Paz, Cochabamba, Santa Cruz) Uruguay (except Bella Union)
- 2027: Cuba, Argentina (remaining areas), Philippines (Mega Manila)
- 2028: Bolivia (other departments), Russia (remaining channels)
- 2029: Paraguay (remaining areas)
- 2030: Bolivia (remaining areas), Ethiopia
- Multiple dates: Angola, Mozambique, DR Congo

Different standards have been developed for the broadcast transmission of digital terrestrial television, comparable to the older analogue standards they replace: NTSC, PAL and SECAM. Broadcasters around the world choose and adopt one of these to be the format and technology behind the transmission. The standards are:

- The European-made DVB-T2 is adopted by Panama, Colombia, most of Europe, Africa, Asia and Oceania.
- The American-made ATSC is adopted by most of North America and some of Asia and Oceania.
- DTMB system, from China, is adopted by China, Laos, Cambodia, and Pakistan.

=== 2006 Geneva Agreement ===
The "RRC-06" agreement in Geneva (hosted by the International Telecommunication Union (ITU)) was signed by delegates from many countries, including most of Europe, Africa and Asia. The agreement set 17 June 2015 as the date after which countries may use frequencies currently assigned for analogue television transmission for digital services (specifically DVB-T), without being required to protect the analogue services of neighbouring countries against interference. This date was generally viewed as an internationally mandated analogue switch-off date, at least along national borders—except for those operating on the VHF band which would be allowed until 17 June 2020.

These deadlines set by the agreement have been difficult to reach in certain regions, like in Africa where most countries missed the 2015 deadline, as well as South East Asia. High upgrade costs are often a reason cited for the slow transition in those regions.

The European Commission, on a different note, had recommended on 28 October 2009 that digital switchover should be completed by 1 January 2012.

=== Digital-to-analogue converters ===
After the switch from analogue to digital broadcasts is complete, analogue-only TVs are incapable of receiving over-the-air broadcasts without the addition of a set-top converter box. Consequently, a digital converter box – an electronic device that connects to an analogue television – must be used to allow the television to receive digital broadcasts. In the United States, the government subsidized the purchase of such boxes for consumers via their coupon-eligible converter box program in 2009, funded by a small part of the billions of dollars brought in by a spectrum auction. The program was managed by the Department of Commerce through its National Telecommunications and Information Administration.

Televisions with integrated digital tuners have been available for a considerable time. This means that a set-top box is usually no longer necessary with a new TV set.

== Overview of the terrestrial digital switchover ==
Digital switchover by country
Country	DTT transmission commenced	Switch-over commenced	Switch-over completed
Albania	15 July 2004	1 October 2019	1 October 2019
Algeria	2008	10 November 2014	10 November 2014
Andorra	2006	25 September 2007	25 September 2007
Argentina	9 September 2008	31 March 2026	31 March 2026
Armenia	2015	10 July 2015	10 July 2015
Australia	1 January 2000	30 June 2010	10 December 2013
Austria	2002	7 June 2011	7 June 2011
Azerbaijan	1 January 2004	17 October 2010	31 December 2011
Belgium	16 July 2002 (RTBF); 31 May 2004 (VRT)	3 November 2008	1 March 2010 (RTBF); 3 November 2008 (VRT)
Bolivia	2011	29 August 2026	2030
Brazil	2 December 2007	15 February 2016	31 December 2025
Brunei	2014	31 July 2017	31 December 2017
Bulgaria	1 November 2004	1 March 2013	30 September 2013
Cambodia	9 November 2010	2023	2023
Canada	1 November 1997	31 August 2011	31 August 2011
Chile	2012	2012	2020
China	1 January 2006	31 December 2007 (Hong Kong); 15 July 2008 (Macau); 8 August 2008 (Mainland China)	1 April 2021
Colombia	2012	31 December 2019	31 December 2019
Costa Rica	15 August 2019	15 August 2019	15 August 2019
(Ivory Coast) Côte d'Ivoire	2016	8 February 2019	June 2020
Croatia	1 May 2002	26 January 2010	5 October 2010
Cuba	2013	2023	2023
Cyprus	1 July 2011	1 July 2011	1 July 2011
Czech Republic	May 2000	September 2007	12 February 2012
Denmark	1 January 1999	1 December 2002 (Faroe Islands); 1 November 2009 (Mainland Denmark and Greenland)	1 December 2002 (Faroe Islands); 1 November 2009 (Mainland Denmark and Greenland)
Dominican Republic	1 January 2010	9 August 2021	9 August 2021
El Salvador	22 April 2009	21 December 2018	2022
Estonia	15 December 2006	1 July 2010	1 July 2010
Finland	16 September 2000 (test); 27 August 2001 (properly)	1 September 2007	1 September 2007
France	1 January 2001	2 February 2010	29 November 2011
Gabon	17 June 2016	17 June 2016	17 June 2016
Ghana	June 2015	June 2015	June 2015
(Georgia (country)) Georgia	1 July 2015	1 July 2015	1 July 2015
Germany	1 November 2002	1 November 2002	3 August 2003
Greece	20 March 2006	24 September 2009	6 February 2015
Hungary	1 October 2001	31 July 2013	31 October 2013
Iceland	1 June 2002	2 February 2015	2 February 2015
India	1 July 1999	31 October 2012	31 December 2019 (metro cities); 31 December 2021 (+1M cities); 31 December 2023 (Everywhere else)
Indonesia	2 January 2006 (test and trial); 13 August 2008 (as DVB-T); 2 February 2012 (as DVB-T2)	17 February 2020 (The metropolitan region of 5 provinces including North Kalimantan, Riau Islands, Aceh, West Kalimantan, and Papua); 30 April 2022 (National symbolic for Riau, NTT, and West Papua)	1 November 2020 (Java Megapolitan Corridor and Strategic Inter-Island Geographical Areas); 12 August 2023 (All the entire 38 provinces nationwide)
Iran	2009	TBD	TBD
(Republic of Ireland) Ireland	15 November 1998	24 October 2012	24 October 2012
Israel	1 January 2006	2 August 2009	31 March 2011
Italy	12 July 1999	15 October 2008	4 July 2012
Japan	1 December 2003	24 July 2010	24 July 2011
Kazakhstan	2010	1 December 2018	1 July 2021
South Korea	5 February 2001	1 September 2010	31 December 2012
Kosovo	TBD	TBD	TBD
Kyrgyzstan	November 2008	15 May 2017	15 May 2017
Latvia	1 May 2002	1 June 2010	1 June 2010
Lithuania	1 March 2001	29 October 2012	29 October 2012
North Macedonia	4 May 2004	1 January 2010	1 June 2013
Malaysia	January 2006	6 June 2017	31 October 2019
Malta	1 June 2004	31 October 2011	31 October 2011
Mauritius	30 September 2005	17 June 2014	17 June 2014
Mexico	1 January 2000	18 July 2013	31 December 2015
Monaco	24 May 2011	24 May 2011	24 May 2011
Mongolia	July 2014	2 March 2015	2015
Montenegro	1 January 2005	17 June 2015	17 June 2015
Moldova	December 2005	March 2020	March 2020
Morocco	February 2007	17 June 2015	17 June 2020
Myanmar	1 January 2005	15 October 2013	2020
Namibia	1 February 2005	13 September 2014	13 September 2014
Nepal	June 2018	TBD	TBD
Netherlands	2000	11 December 2006	11 December 2006
New Zealand	15 November 1998	30 September 2012	1 December 2013
Norway	1 June 2000	1 March 2008	1 December 2009
Pakistan	1 October 2017	TBD	TBD
Papua New Guinea	2014	TBD	TBD
Paraguay	15 August 2011	2021	2021
Peru	30 March 2010	28 July 2020	3 January 2023
Philippines	1 June 2010	15 January 2027	2027
Poland	9 November 2001	7 November 2012	23 July 2013
Portugal	15 November 1998	12 January 2012	26 April 2012
Qatar	1 January 2001	13 February 2012	13 February 2012
Romania	1 December 2005	17 June 2015	1 May 2018
Russia	1 January 2001	3 December 2018	3 June 2019 (Far Eastern Federal District); 14 October 2019 (other Federal Districts)
Rwanda	31 July 2014	31 July 2014	31 July 2014
San Marino	2 December 2010	2 December 2010	2 December 2010
Saudi Arabia	1 January 2001	13 February 2012	13 February 2012
Senegal	2014	September 2019	2020
Serbia	2005	2014	7 June 2015
Singapore	1 January 2007	16 December 2013	1 January 2019
Slovakia	1 May 2000	28 October 2010	31 December 2012
Slovenia	1 September 2001	1 December 2010	30 June 2011
South Africa	1 February 2016	28 October 2016	June 2019
Spain	15 November 1999	5 April 2008	3 April 2010
Sudan	2020	2020	2020
Sweden	15 November 1998	19 September 2005	15 October 2007
Switzerland	24 July 2006	24 July 2006	26 November 2007
Taiwan	1 May 2001	7 May 2012	30 June 2012
Tanzania	July 2014	July 2014	July 2014
Thailand	1 December 2000	1 December 2015	25 March 2020
Tunisia	2003	6 March 2015	3 April 2015
Turkey	2006	TBD	TBD
United Arab Emirates	1 January 2001	13 February 2012	13 February 2012
United Kingdom	15 November 1998	17 October 2007	24 July 2009 (Isle of Man); 31 March 2010 (Wales); 17 November 2010 (Channel Islands); 22 June 2011 (Scotland); 26 September 2012 (England); 24 October 2012 (Northern Ireland)
United States	24 December 1996	8 September 2008	12 June 2009 (full power stations); 1 September 2015 (Class-A low power stations); 13 July 2021 (Remaining low power stations outside of Alaska); 10 January 2022 (Remaining low power stations in Alaska)
Ukraine	1 January 2000	1 August 2018	1 September 2018 (Most other territories); 1 January 2020 (Russian-bordering regions; local channels without digital license)
Uzbekistan	2010	15 January 2018	5 December 2018
Venezuela	2008	2020	2020
Vietnam	2002 (test); 27 December 2011	1 July 2015	28 December 2020
Zambia	31 December 2014	31 December 2014	31 December 2014

== Africa ==
=== Angola ===
Trials using the ISDB-T standard were tested in 2011. Later in 2013, the state decided to use DVB-T2 instead, with a launch date for 2017. However, this was reviewed once again, and in 2019, Angola picked ISDB-T to be the standard for its future DTT network. The process began in 2020 with the aim of being complete by 2025–28.

=== Benin ===
In transition to digital as of 2018. No completion date yet.

=== Botswana ===
Botswana began digital broadcasts in 2008, using ISDB-T. Botswana became the first country in Africa to adopt ISDB-T International on 26 February 2013. It evaluated the hierarchical mode of operation, which allows for simultaneous transmission to fixed, mobile, and portable receivers from a single transmitter, as an advantage over DVB-T2. Analogue signals were to be terminated in 2024. However, Botswana changed the date to 28 February 2022.

=== Burkina Faso ===
In transition to digital as of 2018. No completion date yet.

=== Burundi ===
DTT broadcasts launched on 30 April 2014 and it was expected to shut analogue down at the end of that year. However the transition was not easy and analogue remained on air, still as of 2019. No completion date yet.

=== Cameroon ===
Transition is ongoing as of 2015. No completion date yet.

=== Cape Verde ===
Started transitioning to digital in the early 2010s. The analogue switch off happened to complete at the end of 2019.

=== Central African Republic ===
In transition to digital as of 2018. No completion date yet.

=== Chad ===
Deployment of DTT has been planned as of 2017 together with StarTimes. Government announced that year to accelerate the process.

=== Comoros ===
Introduced digital broadcasts using the DTMB standard. No completion date yet.

=== Republic of the Congo ===
DTT started trials in December 2016. It was announced in June 2018 that DTT should start in 2019. No completion date yet.

=== Democratic Republic of the Congo ===
In transition to digital as of 2016. Later in 2018, the state decided to use DVB-T2 instead, with a launch date for 2018. However, this was reviewed once again, and in 2019, the country picked ISDB-T to be the standard for its future DTT network. The process began in 2021 with the aim of being complete by 2024–31.

=== Côte d'Ivoire ===
Launched its DTV service from the Centre Émetteur D'Abobo site in Abidjan on 8 February 2019. Côte d'Ivoire completed the migration to DTT in June 2020.

=== Djibouti ===
Transition is ongoing as of 2020.

=== Equatorial Guinea ===
The transition has still been planned as of 2018.

=== Eritrea ===
From 25 May to 14 June 2019, CCTV and People's Republic of China Embassy in Eritrea had a training program for 71 staff members to train at Shooting Methods for High Definition Cameras, Digital Non-Linear Editing, Digital Terrestrial TV Broadcasting, FM-SFM Application and Digital Audio Broadcasting as well as Insights into Monitoring and Play-out Systems.

=== Eswatini ===
The switchover is complete. Analogue switchoff started on 17 June 2015 and it was completed in 2016.

=== Ethiopia ===
In 2016, the country began its digital switch-over to DVB-T2 with help from American digital transmitter manufacturer GatesAir and funded by JPMorgan Chase and Export Development Canada. According to the government, this might finish between 2021 and 2026.

=== Gabon ===
All analogue signals were turned off on 17 June 2016.

=== The Gambia ===
In transition to digital, aimed to complete analogue switch off by 2020.

=== Ghana ===
Analogue switch-off occurred in June 2015, switching to DVB-T.

=== Guinea ===
A June 2018 meeting confirmed that a digital migration would start.

=== Guinea-Bissau ===
The government partnered with StarTimes to create a DTT network.

=== Kenya ===
After DTT launched in 2008, analogue switch off was supposed to take place in 2013, however media houses challenged the move in court and the switch off was since moved to 31 December 2014 for the metropolitan areas and their surroundings, while the rest of the country switched to DVB-T2 in March 2015.

=== Lesotho ===
Introduced DVB-T2. Analogue shutdown was to occur on 17 June 2015, but it did not occur. No analogue switchover date yet.

=== Liberia ===
As of 2017, the country has been "optimistic" to start DTT broadcasts with help from the Chinese state's StarTimes.

=== Madagascar ===
Introduced DTT based on DVB-T in 2014. No completion date yet.

=== Malawi ===
The switchover is complete. Analogue shutdown was to happen in 2013, but this was changed to 2015, and then changed again to March 2021.

=== Mali ===
The country's regulator authorized TNTSAT Africa to start the transition to digital in 2018. No completion date yet.

=== Mauritius ===
First digital (DVB-T) broadcasts commenced 30 September 2005. Analogue shut off on 17 June 2014.

=== Mozambique ===
The earliest form of digital television in Mozambique began in 1996 with the Southern African pay-TV operator DStv. Channels were transmitted and received via satellites and digital decoders. Some years later, TVCabo began transmitting, first through analog and later digital means, using decoders and an extensive fibre-optic network. On 18 January 2011, Mozambique's Ministry of Transport and Communications announced that the country would adopt the DVB-T2 system for the transmission of terrestrial television channels. The implementation was expected to be completed by 2015. Mozambique began transitioning to DVB-T2 in 2013. According to the government, the transition might finish between 2025 and 2030. The official launch took place on 8 December 2015. No completion date yet.

=== Namibia ===
Namibia was the first African country to go digital when it launched DTT in February 2005. The pay-TV operator MultiChoice already operated a digital television service using the DVB-T standard. At one stage, Namibia's public broadcasters still relied on analogue transmission and had not announced a transition date to digital television. Analogue signals were terminated on 13 September 2014.

=== Niger ===
DTT was deployed on 21 September 2018 after three years of testing. No ASO date yet.

=== Nigeria ===
Switchover to DVB-T2 is ongoing, stewarded by GatesAir. The aim is to complete the switchover by December 2026.

=== Rwanda ===
Shut off the last of its analogue signals on 31 July 2014. Switched to DVB-T, with plans to upgrade to DVB-T2 in the future.

=== Saint Helena ===
Introduced DTT in 2012. No completion date yet.

=== São Tomé and Príncipe ===
The country planned in 2014 to make a transition to digital. StarTimes has taken over the DTT process.

=== Senegal ===
Excaf Telecom won the public tender in 2014 to broadcast the country's DVB-T2 DTT network. The analogue switch began in September 2019 and continued until 2020.

=== Seychelles ===
In 2018, they launched their DTT Service where both analogue and digital signals coexist, but after a period of instability on DTT, it became stabilised and ultimately was switched off in 2020.

=== Sierra Leone ===
In June 2013, the country signed a deal with the Chinese StarTimes to manage a migration to digital TV. However, the process has been slow and there is still no DTT operating as of 2017.

=== Somaliland ===
A switchover to digital TV was part of the government's 2012–2016 National Development Plan. However, it missed the international 2015 deadline to launch its DTT network.

=== South Africa ===
The first digital television implementation in South Africa was a satellite-based system launched by the pay-TV operator MultiChoice in 1995. On 22 February 2007, the South African government announced that the country's public TV operators would be broadcasting in digital by 1 November 2008, followed by a three-year dual-illumination period ending on 1 November 2011. In January 2011, the government announced a change in its choice of technology from DVB-T to DVB-T2, with the analog switch-off date postponed to December 2013. The rollout of digital television has been further delayed. The Northern Cape became the first province to switch fully to digital in December 2018. It was planned that analogue would have been switched off in March 2022. However, in December 2022, Minister Khumbudzo Ntshavheni announced that the analogue television broadcast signal would be switched off on 31 March 2023. The transition was further delayed until 31 March 2025, although it did not occur.

=== South Sudan ===
The state broadcaster SSBC has expressed interest in DVB-T2, but no budget has been allocated for the project.

=== Sudan ===
A number of multiplexes in DVB-T2 (SD & HD) have been broadcasting from Sudan TV since late 2015. A single analogue UHF channel remained until 13 February 2020.

=== Tanzania ===
Shut off the last of its analogue signals in July 2014. Switched to DVB-T2.

=== Togo ===
In transition to digital as of 2018. Broadcasting equipment manufacturer Harris Corporation helped to transition Togo to DVB-T2. No completion date yet.

=== Uganda ===
Shut off analogue signals in 2015.

=== Zambia ===
Analogue shut off on 31 December 2014. Switched to DVB-T2.

=== Zimbabwe ===
The DTT project started in 2015. However digital transmission has still not been rolled out as of 2019, mainly because of budgetary issues. The government has still committed to make the switchover.

== Middle East and North Africa ==
=== Algeria ===
Digital broadcasting started in 2009, analogue signals were switched off first in Annaba Region in mid-2020 and completed in November 2020.

=== Bahrain ===
Analogue satellite transmission was switched off on 1 March 2004. The analogue terrestrial transmissions were terminated on 13 February 2012 and were replaced by a multiplex in DVB-T2. Bahrain began transitioning from using MPEG-2 to MPEG-4 for its terrestrial broadcasts on 26 August 2012. Bahrain adopted DVB-T2 in March 2013. The government planned to turn off analogue cable by 31 March 2023.

=== Egypt ===
Egypt has had DVB-T transmissions for several years as of 2019, with plans to roll out DVB-T2 that year. In 2020–2021, for the first time in Africa, HD demonstration content was received via satellite without the need for a separate external receiver or decoder. At the 2021 Industry Day's conference in Egypt, Cairo broadcast quality HD content (with a resolution of 1080 × 720 pixels at 50 FPS) was encoded using an AVS encoder at a bit rate of . Analogue switch off was completed in 2021, while low-power relays of Channel 1 (Egypt) and some regional ERTU channels for rural areas remain on air, while other Nile TV channels and Time Sports continue on DVB-T2.

=== Iran ===
Iran started the transition to digital TV broadcasting in 2009 using the DVB-T MPEG-4 standard. Iran plans to switch over completely to digital TV by 2015. As of summer 2011, Iranian digital TV broadcast covered 40% of Iran's population. Analogue switchover was completed in 2023 after the last switchover occurred in the city of Tehran in May 2023.

=== Iraq ===
DVB-T/T2 DTT is operating, including in the Kurdistan Region. No analogue switchover date yet.

=== Israel ===
The Knesset approved the law regarding DTT in late 2007. The Second Authority for Television and Radio is responsible for the deployment of the system, whose branded name is "Idan+". The system consists of 10 channels: Kan 11, Makan 33, Kan Educational, Keshet 12, Reshet 13, Channel 14, Knesset Channel, Music 24, Israel Plus, and Hala TV. DVB-T standard broadcasts using the MPEG-4 Part 10, H.264 (AVC) video and HE AAC+ V2 audio codecs were launched in mid-2009, with digital transmissions starting on 2 August 2009. Analogue transmissions ended on 31 March 2011. In August 2015, a DVB-T2 standard system was launched in parallel as a second MUX. In February 2025, the DVB-T standard was discontinued, and the country maintains only the DVB-T2 standard.

=== Jordan ===
In transition to digital as of 2019. No completion date yet.

=== Kuwait ===
Kuwait is in transition to DVB-T2, stewarded by GatesAir. Phase 2 of the DTT rollout was finished by May 2017. Kuwait uses DVB-T2 technology for broadcasting TV channels within its borders, with reception through receivers connected to television sets if the sets do not support the technology. The digital terrestrial TV package covers the following channels:

- The First
- The Second
- Sports
- Sports Plus
- Enrichment
- Arabi
- The Council
- Spouse
- Stay Home

Most countries of the world use digital terrestrial television broadcasting technology. No analogue switch off date yet.

=== Lebanon ===
In January 2015, a pilot project DTT was launched from Télé Liban broadcasting states. The service has publicly rolled out and by 2026 it is 80% completed.

=== Libya ===
7 multiplexes of DVB-T2 were available in Tripoli in 2012. Analogue television was turned off on 13 February 2020.

=== Morocco ===
The National Television Company in Morocco started DVB-T-based digital TV deployment in February 2007. DTT launched in March 2007.

Digital TV is now available in the following cities and their regions: Casablanca, Benslimane, Settat, Nouaceur, Mediouna, Mohammedia, Rabat, Salé, Skhirat-Temara, Kenitra, Sidi Kacem, Khemisset, Meknes, Fes, Oujda, Tanger, and Marrakech.

Analogue transmitters on the UHF band were switched off on 17 June 2015. Analogue transmitters on the VHF band were switched off on 17 June 2020.

=== Oman ===
The process started in 2012 with the deployment of a DVB-T2 system. No completion date yet.

=== Palestine ===
A digital switchover has been planned by the Palestinian Authority as of 2013, although its rollout has been delayed.

=== Qatar ===
Analogue satellite transmission was switched off on 1 March 2004. Digital television launched terrestrially throughout the Arab world on 11 June 2006 (known as Nilesat). The analogue terrestrial transmissions were terminated on 13 February 2012 and were replaced by a multiplex for DVB-T2. Qatar began transitioning from using MPEG-2 to MPEG-4 for its terrestrial broadcasts on 26 August 2012. Qatar adopted DVB-T2 in February 2013. The government planned to turn off analogue cable by 31 March 2023.

=== Saudi Arabia ===
Analogue satellite transmission was switched off on 1 March 2004. The first phase of digital terrestrial television (DTT) transmission in Saudi Arabia was launched on 11 June 2006 in the main cities of Riyadh, Jeddah, and Dammam, according to Arab News. Assistant Deputy Minister of Culture and Information for Engineering Affairs Riyadh Najm said: "The southern city of Abha and the central city of Buraidah will also have the facility within this month." He added, "By February next year the DTT system will cover not less than 23 cities, and that accounts for more than 70 percent of the population." He also said the DTT technology would allow people to receive all four Saudi channels (Channel One, Channel Two, Arriyadiah, and Al Ekhbariya) as well as the Saudi radio programmes (General Programme, Radio Qur'an, Second Programme, and European Programme) with better clarity. The analogue terrestrial transmissions were terminated on 13 February 2012 and were replaced by a multiplex for DVB-T2. Saudi Arabia began transitioning from using MPEG-2 to MPEG-4 for its terrestrial broadcasts on 26 August 2012. Saudi Arabia adopted DVB-T2 in March 2013. The government planned to turn off analogue cable by 31 March 2023.

=== Syria ===
The digital television service (DVB-T) in Syria was restarted in mid-2018, in the provinces of Damascus, Daraa, As Suwayda, Rif Dimashq, Tartus, Latakia, Quneitra and Hama. There is no date for completion.

=== Tunisia ===
Digital broadcasts began in 2010, using DVB-T, then since 2015, using DVB-T2. Analogue television was turned off on 28 December 2016.

=== United Arab Emirates ===
Analogue satellite transmission was switched off on 1 March 2004. Digital television launched terrestrially throughout the Arab world on 11 June 2006 (known as Nilesat). The United Arab Emirates began transitioning from using MPEG-2 to MPEG-4 for its terrestrial broadcasts on 26 August 2012. The United Arab Emirates adopted DVB-T2 in February 2013. The analogue terrestrial transmissions were terminated at the end of 2013 and replaced by a multiplex in DVB-T2. The government planned to turn off analogue cable by 31 March 2023.

== Asia ==
=== Afghanistan ===
4 channels of DVB-T2 were launched in Kabul in June 2014. ASO has however been repeatedly delayed. There is no date for the switchover due to the fall of Kabul in 2021. Only minor progress has been made since; the majority of Afghanistan still uses analogue terrestrial antennas for television.

=== Armenia ===
Shut down analogue signals on 10 July 2015.

=== Bangladesh ===
Has adopted DVB-T and tested broadcasts as of 2014. Public broadcaster BTV aimed to make the country digital by 2021, the 50th anniversary of independence. The DTT network has not yet rolled out. DVB-S2 is standard for satellite broadcasting on Bangladesh Satellite-1 to Akash DTH.

=== Bhutan ===
Adopted DVB-T. The original analogue switch off date was set to be 2017, although it did not occur.

=== British Indian Ocean Territory ===
Military broadcaster BFBS operates fully on digital.

=== Brunei ===
The country selected the standard of DVB-T2 with first launch in 2014. Full transition to digital terrestrial television broadcasting was completed on 31 December 2017.

=== Cambodia ===
A digital television trial ran from 9 November 2000 to 31 May 2001 and was officially launched on 9 November 2010 by TV5. DVB-T2 was launched on Tuesday, 9 November 2010. The analogue switch-off was expected between 2015 and 2020.

As of 2017, Phnom Penh Cable Television and One TV offer encrypted DVB-T2 pay-TV services, viewable only with a subscription and a set-top box with a card.

In Phnom Penh, the following channels are available free-to-air: S Movie, SREPLAY (ETV), S Cinema, Nice TV, Fox Sports, Fox Action Movies, ARY Musik, CGTN Documentary, YTN World, SanSha TV, and OneTV Sabay 1.

By 23 December 2019, the only FTA DVB-T channels appeared to be pay TV channels that the provider erroneously neglected to encrypt. The incumbent FTA channels have thus far not provided DVB-T broadcasts. The Cambodian government pushed ahead its co-operation with China for the digital transition from analogue with China's DTMB system. Full digital transition was estimated by the government to have fully commenced by 2023, but it was delayed up until late 2025.

=== China ===
China started its transition to digital television in 1995, with cable and satellite television using DVB and terrestrial television using DTMB in 2003. Analogue satellite television ended on 31 December 2001, after the last satellite television channels on Apstar-1A including Zhejiang Television, switched to digital, in which time the legal holders of satellite television receivers were limited to regional cable television providers, thus China never actually had analogue satellite television service provided to the masses.

In 2003, China's State Administration of Radio, Film, and Television (SARFT) selected 41 locations for digital television trials, which began later that year. Following national development plans, SARFT created a timetable for transitioning from analog to digital broadcasting. The plan aimed for full digital implementation by 2008 and a complete phase-out of analog television by 2015. By the end of 2007, China was estimated to have over 27 million digital TV users.

In 2004, a debate emerged over whether the digital television standard developed by Tsinghua University or Shanghai Jiao Tong University should be adopted nationally. In July 2007, China announced a unified national standard, primarily based on Tsinghua University's technology, which made up 95% of the final version.

On 1 September 2005, the first HDTV channel in China, which would later be broadcast nationwide, began airing in Hangzhou. Analogue cable television services were largely discontinued in the late 2000s and early 2010s.

On 14 May 2016, all channels of China Central Television, as the country's state broadcaster, officially converted to digital broadcasting in a 4-step conversion. The first analogue broadcasting television station officially turned off on 30 August 2020 at 23:59:59 CST (UTC+8) for all of Hunan Province on Hunan Television only, and all analogue broadcastings officially turned off full-time and completely on New Year's Eve (31 December) 2020 at 03:59:59 CST (UTC+8) nationwide (including Shanghai and Suzhou). All analogue broadcastings officially turned off full-time and completely on 31 March 2021 at 23:59:59 CST (UTC+8) for all of Shaanxi Province. On New Year's Eve (31 December) 2020 at 04:00:00 CST (UTC+8), the digital terrestrial television of the People's Republic of China fully shifted and switched to full high definition nationwide (including Shanghai and Suzhou). On 1 April 2021, the digital terrestrial television of the People's Republic of China fully shifted and switched to full high definition for all of Shaanxi Province.

=== Cyprus ===
All analogue transmissions terminated on 30 June 2011 and moved to digital-only transmissions on MPEG-4 on Friday, 1 July 2011.

- Northern Cyprus: Broadcaster BRT halted analogue signals on 31 March 2019, replaced by DVB-T which started testing in the country in 2009.

=== Georgia ===
Analogue broadcasts were planned to switch off by 17 June 2015, but due to the flooding in Tbilisi, which occurred on the night of 13 to 14 June 2015, the analogue switchover happened on 1 July 2015.

=== Hong Kong ===
On 31 December 2007, local broadcasters began airing high-definition television (HDTV) using China's DTMB standard (1920×1080i). The original digital switchover plan from PAL to DTMB was supposed to take place in 2012. After being postponed multiple times, analogue broadcasting officially ended from 30 November 2020 at 23:59 HKT, when all analogue transmissions turned off. A total of 160,000 lower-income households also received subsidies from the government to buy digital television sets or a set-top box to get a digital signal following the transition. As of 2026, 12 HD channels broadcast 24 hours a day. Broadcasters in Hong Kong have shown interest in adopting the same standard to facilitate transmission into Southern China and reduce costs associated with format conversion.

=== India ===
As of 2024–25, India had 908 permitted private satellite television channels. The country adopted the DVB-T system for digital terrestrial broadcasting in July 1999. Doordarshan began DVB-T transmissions on 26 January 2003 in the four major metropolitan cities. Terrestrial broadcasts are currently available in both analog and digital formats. Under the Cable Digitalisation Act, all cable networks were required to switch from analog to digital transmission by 31 March 2015, with the transition completed in four phases.

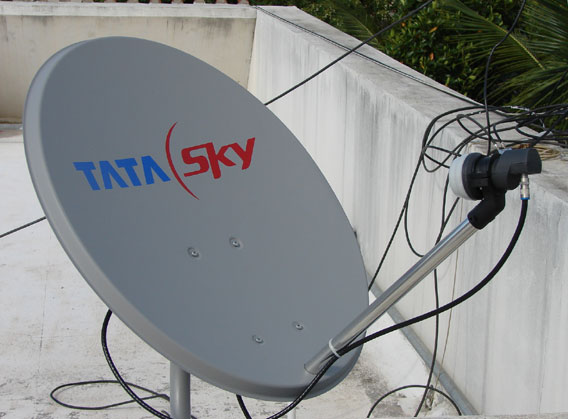
Tata Sky Dish India

India's digital switchover was implemented in phases, beginning with the four major metropolitan cities—New Delhi, Mumbai, Kolkata, and Chennai—on 1 November 2012. The second phase covered cities like Patna, Chandigarh, Pune, and Bengaluru, with a cutoff date of 31 March 2013. The third phase, ending on 30 November 2014, included all other urban areas, including state capitals. The final phase for remaining cities was scheduled for 31 March 2015. The nationwide transition to digital broadcasting was completed in December 2016.

Digital television in India is also available through Direct-to-Home (DTH) services, which deliver TV channels via satellite directly to viewers' homes. These services use both Indian satellites, built by ISRO (such as INSAT-4A and INSAT-3C), and international satellites like NSS 6 and Thaicom-2.

As of 2010, India had over 23 million DTH subscribers and seven major providers, including Dish TV, Tata Sky, Sun Direct, BIG TV (Reliance), Airtel Digital TV, and the public service DD Direct Plus. With over 110 million TV households and multiple companies competing for viewers, India had the most competitive satellite TV market in the world. In 2012, it became the largest direct-to-home satellite market, surpassing the United States.

The Telecom Regulatory Authority of India set the deadlines for the completion of digital transitioning at the end of years, with Phase I (Metro cities) by 31 December 2019 and Phase II (cities having a population of more than one million) by 31 December 2021. The authority also set a deadline for Phase III (the rest of India) by 31 December 2023.

=== Indonesia ===
Indonesia began experimenting with digital television broadcasting in 2006. Digital terrestrial television was launched on 13 August 2008 (by DVB-T) and 2 February 2012 (by DVB-T2). In January 2014, the Supreme Court annulled regulations issued by the Ministry of Communication and Information Technology, removing the requirement for an analog shut-off and allowing local analog broadcasters to lease channels allocated for digital broadcasting. From August 2014, UHF DVB-T2 equipment became available for public purchase. Following the legalization of Act No. 19 and Act No. 20 of 2017 on Media Convergence, Broadcasting, and Telecommunications on 29 November and 15 December 2017, the Ministry of Communication and Information Technology (Kemenkominfo), through its minister Johnny G. Plate, announced that 17 February 2020 would be the last analogue switchover date for the migration to digital television under the DVB-T2 system. On 31 December 2018, the government of Indonesia announced that the analogue switch off would be implemented gradually in much simplified three stages to accelerate the migration. The first analogue shutdown occurred in a few areas on 17 February 2020, followed by other areas on 5 January 2020.

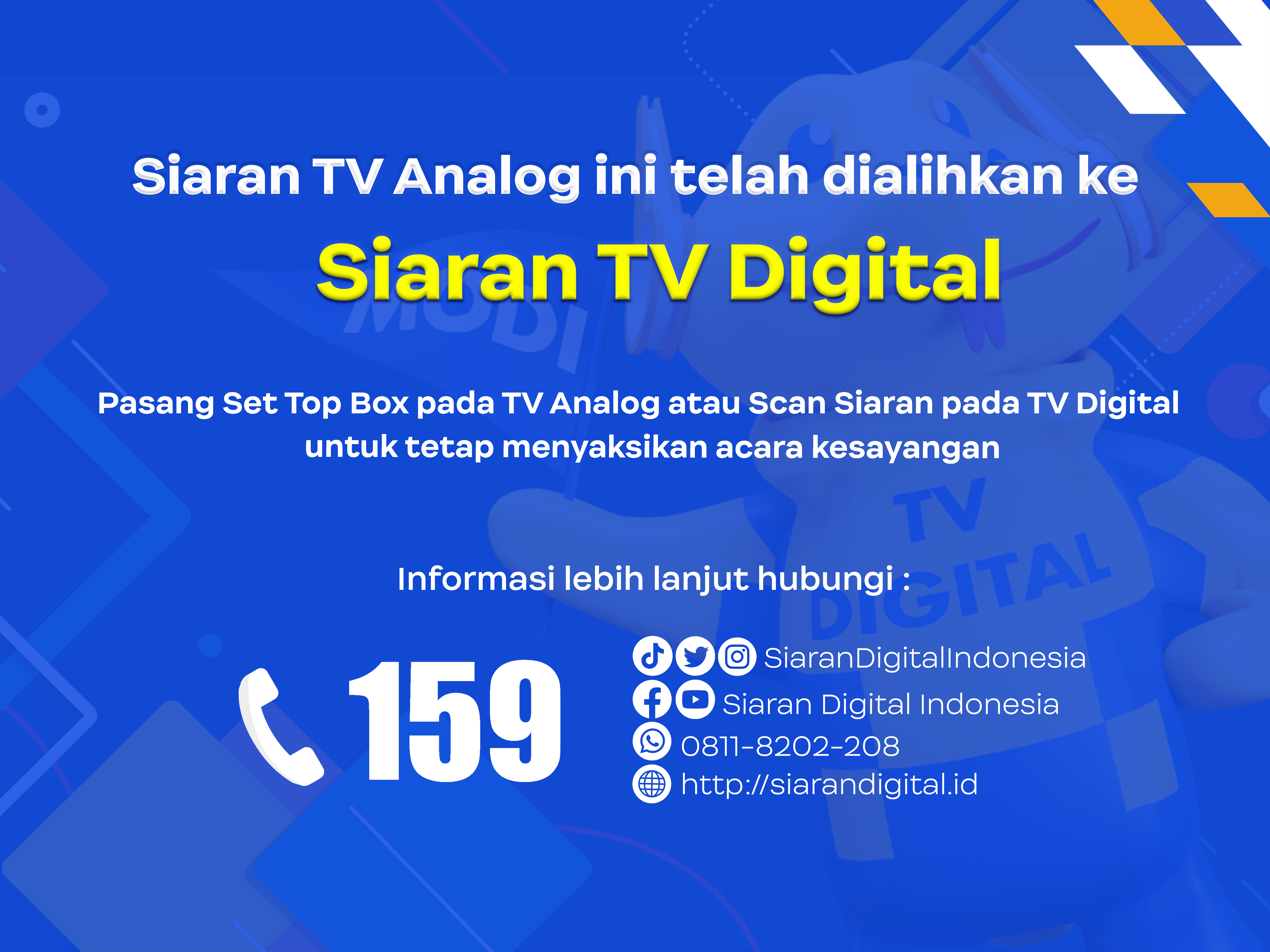
Analogue closedown warning broadcast in Indonesia

The analogue broadcasting station in Jakarta, along with 173 regencies/cities of non-terrestrial services, was officially turned off on 17 February 2020 at 11:59:59pm (except ANTV, RCTI, MNCTV, GTV and iNews on 18 February 2020). Previously, on 17 February 2020, LPP TVRI had turned off its analogue broadcasts or analogue switch off (ASO) and replaced them with digital broadcasts throughout the region at exactly 12:01am (UTC+7). Thus, TVRI became the first television station (multiplexing operator) to stop its analogue broadcasts. Batam and Medan followed on 5 January 2020; Bandung, Semarang, Surakarta and Yogyakarta on 5 March 2020; Surabaya and Banjarmasin on 27 March 2020; Bali and Makassar on 20 July 2020; and Palembang on 31 July 2020. On 31 July 2020 at the stroke of midnight, Trans Media (Trans TV and Trans7) and Emtek/SCM (SCTV and Indosiar) officially completed the shutdown. On 17 October 2020 at the stroke of midnight, Viva Group, RTV and NET officially completed the shutdown of analogue broadcast nationwide, followed by MNC Group on 18 October 2023 at the stroke of midnight. On 1 November 2020, the digital terrestrial television of Indonesia fully shifted and switched to high definition on all thirteen local free-to-air terrestrial television stations.

=== Japan ===
Japan was an early developer of high-definition television (HDTV), initially using an analog system that was later found to be incompatible with digital standards. Digital terrestrial HD broadcasting via the ISDB-T system began on 1 December 2003 in major metropolitan areas and was expanded nationwide by September 2007. Analog high-definition television broadcasting ended on Sunday, 30 September 2007. By January 2008, around 31 million HD receivers had been sold in the country.

Japan considered technical improvements to ISDB-T proposed by Brazilian researchers involved in the SBTVD project, though these changes were not adopted due to compatibility issues. They were instead considered for use in other countries.

Adoption of digital TV in Japan was slowed by high equipment costs and concerns about digital rights management. In response, the "Dubbing 10" rule was introduced in July 2008, allowing consumers to make up to ten copies of digital broadcasts.

By March 2008, more than 32 million ISDB-T television sets had been installed in Japan. That same year, guidelines were issued for developing PC-compatible DTT receiver units.

The analogue shutdown began on 24 July 2010 in Suzu, Ishikawa as a pilot experiment. As part of the transition to digital, analog broadcasting was permanently shut down in parts of Ishikawa Prefecture in September 2010, ahead of the nationwide shutdown scheduled for 24 July 2011. Analogue terrestrial television transmissions in the remainder of Ishikawa Prefecture and 43 other prefectures, as well as analogue Broadcast Satellite and Wowow services, ended at noon on Sunday, 24 July 2011, along with the analogue satellite services. In three prefectures affected by the 11 March 2011 9.0 magnitude Tohoku earthquake and its related nuclear accidents—Iwate, Miyagi, and Fukushima—the analog shutdown was postponed until noon on Saturday, 31 March 2012. In both of those cases, the analogue transmitters themselves were switched off at midnight on the same day.

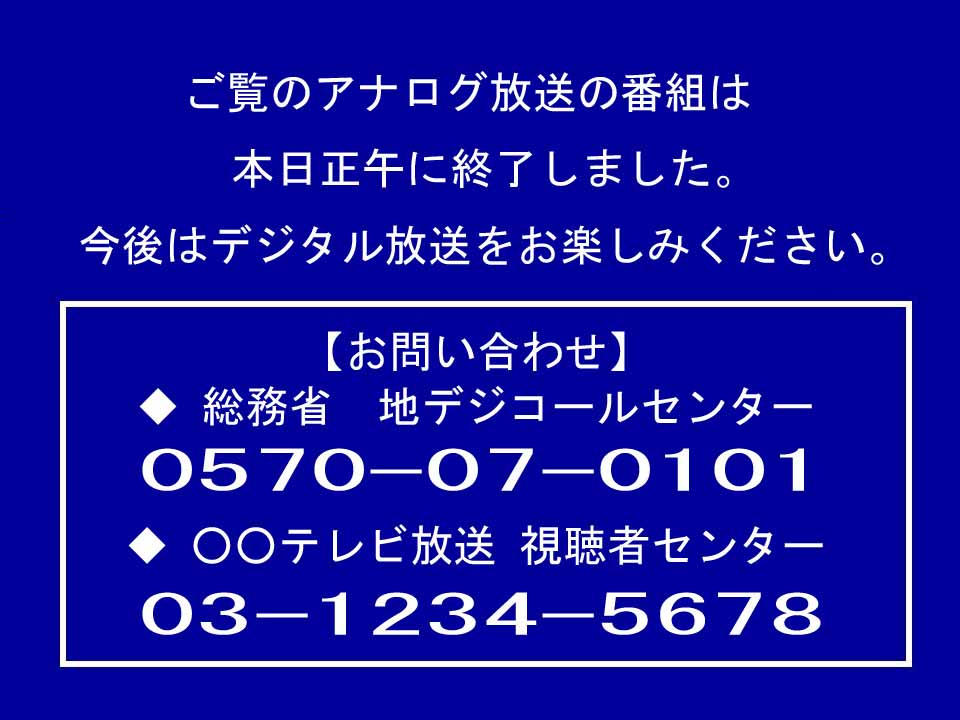
Example of analogue broadcast termination notice screen in Japan.

Like the Netherlands, Germany, and Sweden, an analogue cable service (known as Dejiana since 1 July 2011) continued to be broadcast, but starting on 1 April 2012, all cable providers in Japan were required to convert from analogue to digital services. Most analogue cable services were terminated between 24 July 2011 and April 2015. All television stations across the country now broadcast only in digital, ending an analogue-digital simulcast period that began on Monday, 1 December 2003 in the Kantō region (which expanded to all other prefectures over the next four years) and ended between 24 July 2011 and 31 March 2012 (when all analogue transmissions were shut down).

=== Kazakhstan ===
Analogue broadcasting shutdown began on 1 December 2018, when the first two regions were turned off: Jambyl and Mangystau Regions. On 1 July 2019, nine more regions were disconnected: South Kazakhstan, Atyrau, Kyzylorda, Almaty Regions, East Kazakhstan, Pavlodar, North Kazakhstan, Kostanay and Karaganda Regions. Finally, on 1 July 2021, the last five regions were disconnected: West Kazakhstan, Akmola, Aktobe Regions, Nur-Sultan and Almaty.

=== Laos ===
Lao National Television joined China's Yunnan Digital TV Company to establish Lao Digital TV with the DTMB system in 2007. Lao Deputy Minister of Information, Culture and Tourism Savankhone Razmountry further stated that their country was making every effort to fully switch from the analogue television system to DTMB by 2020. The plan was delayed and as of 2026, analog signals have not yet switched off.

=== Macau ===
Adopted the DTMB standard as mainland China and Hong Kong in 2008. Analogue terrestrial television broadcasts were ended on 30 June 2023. There is no deadline yet for converting analogue cable television broadcasts to digital.

=== Malaysia ===
Malaysia began testing DVB-T in 2006, and limited digital terrestrial television (DTT) services were introduced in January 2014. Full nationwide coverage of an estimated 98% of populated areas was expected by the end of the analogue-digital simulcast period. Digital television was officially launched on 6 June 2017 by the Prime Minister with the introduction of MYTV Broadcasting, and an estimated 4.2 million digital television decoders were to be given free to citizens, including recipients of the government aid of 1Malaysia People's Aid (BR1M). TV Alhijrah became the first station to close its analogue transmitters, around late 2017–2019 in various areas starting from Ipoh, Alor Setar, Kuching and Kota Bharu, due to very low viewership on analogue. The service initially included nine channels, and the nationwide transition from analog to digital broadcasting was scheduled in stages throughout 2019.

The switchover began in Langkawi on 21 July 2019 at 02:30am (UTC+8) and was completed in West Malaysia on 16 October, followed by East Malaysia on 24 October 2019. Later, on 6 August 2019, MCMM released the complete list of transition dates for the remaining areas. The Malaysian Communications and Multimedia Commission (MCMC) announced in late September that the full digital transition was to be completed on 31 October 2019. The switchover was scheduled with central and southern West Malaysia on 30 September, northern and eastern coasts of West Malaysia on 14 October, and the entirety of East Malaysia on 31 October. The digital transition in West Malaysia was completed on 15 October 2019 at 12:30am, with East Malaysia later on 31 October 2019, also at 12:30am.

Satellite

- Astro (DVB-S over Ku-Band in 1995)
  - Astro B.yond (DVB-S over Ku-Band in 1995 and DVB-S2 over Ka-Band in 2005)
  - Astro NJOI (DVB-S over Ku-Band in 1995 and DVB-S2 over Ka-Band in 2005)
- OK Vision (DVB-S2 over Ku-Band in 2005)

Cable

- ABN Xcess (DVB-C, coaxial cable in 1995)

IPTV

- Unifi TV (DVB-IPTV, Fiber, VLAN 600 in 2018)
- Astro IPTV (DVB-IPTV, Fiber, VLAN 612 in 2018)
- DETV (DVB-IPTV, open Internet in 2018)

=== Maldives ===
In 2015, the country picked the ISDB-T standard for its DTT network. The service rolled out in 2022.

=== Mongolia ===
The country adopted DVB-T2 in 2014, with digital switchover completed in 2015.

=== Myanmar ===
Digital broadcasts launched in 2013. The switchover date was set to be December 2020.

=== Nepal ===
Digital terrestrial broadcasts launched in 2018. That same year, analogue cable television was shut down in the capital Kathmandu.

=== North Korea ===
It was reported in 2013 that North Korea had tested digital broadcasting trials in 2012. DVB-T2 was adopted as the digital terrestrial television broadcast standard. On 19 January 2015, Korean Central Television, the country's state broadcaster, began broadcasting via digital satellite. However, there is no confirmed plan yet to introduce digital terrestrial broadcasts.

=== Pakistan ===
Digital television has been launched in Pakistan with Chinese assistance as part of the China–Pakistan Economic Corridor

On 20 April 2015, Prime Minister of Pakistan Nawaz Sharif and General Secretary of the Chinese Communist Party Xi Jinping implemented a number of agreements between the two very friendly countries which included Pakistani adoption of the Digital Terrestrial Multimedia Broadcast Chinese standard. The Pakistani side had previously evaluated the other competing digital standards, including the European DVB-T in 1998 and Japanese ISDB-T in 2003, before rejecting them in favour of the Chinese technology which extremely impressed the Pakistani government. ZTE, a Chinese telecommunications giant, was selected by the Chinese government to roll out digital television services in Pakistan. This will also include staff training and content creation including partnerships with Chinese multinational companies in multiple areas including television sets and set top boxes as a form of "International Cooperation". The first DTMB services were then tested with the signing of a memorandum of understanding (MoU) between the Pakistani Ministry of Information and Broadcasting and China's National Development and Reform Commission. A pilot project was successfully completed in 2018 for $2 million. It was expected that the system would roll out to the public in 2020.

The Chinese presence in Pakistan's digital landscape has been increasing in recent years, and the DTMB adoption by Pakistan and the increasing Chinese information and telecommunications technology in Pakistan is part of the wider Belt and Road Initiative with the goal to create a "Digital Silk Road" from Pakistan to Africa and Europe.

=== Philippines ===
Digital television transition in the Philippines started its planning stage in 2006 after the National Telecommunications Commission released a memorandum on what DTV broadcast standard was to be adopted for the country. The commission decided to have UHF TV channels 14–51 at frequency spectrum 470-698 MHz given over to digital broadcast. The commission opted not to choose the ATSC standard, although the Philippines uses the NTSC-M standard. Instead the country started test trials of two different standards, those being the DVB of Europe and ISDB of Japan. Many broadcasters agreed to adopt the Japanese ISDB but some opted for the European DVB. On 11 June 2010, the National Telecommunications Commission of the Philippines announced that the country would adopt the ISDB standard. The first fully operational digital TV channel in the country is GEM-TV49 of the religious group Iglesia ni Cristo.

In June 2010, the National Telecommunications Commission set a deadline of 11:59pm on 31 December 2015 for the discontinuation of analogue television. However, in the last quarter of 2014, the digitization deadline was postponed to 2019 (and, in turn, bumped to 2023) and all remaining analogue transmitters in the nation are now expected to be shut off by 2026. ABS-CBN was the first channel to experiment with digital TV broadcasting through its television provider, ABS-CBN TV Plus. However the channel was forced to end all broadcasts—analog and digital—on 30 June 2020 due to a controversial cease and desist order released by National Telecommunications Commission. ZOE Broadcasting Network's DZOZ-TV became the first TV station in the country to permanently cease analogue terrestrial operations on 28 February 2017, signaling the start of the country's transition to digital-only broadcasting. Digital television in the Philippines uses the Japanese ISDB standards for its terrestrial digital broadcast. By November 2026, all Mega Manila TV stations will shut off their analogue broadcasts according to the National Telecommunications Commission but extended to 15 January 2027.

While the Japanese ISDB-T standard was adopted for terrestrial digital TV transmission, digital cable and satellite TV providers in the Philippines such as SkyCable and Cignal use the European DVB system for service distribution to carry some channels based in Europe, Taiwan, Malaysia, and Singapore (which are using DVB) through country-specific feed of them.

An internet user had created an online petition urging NTC to adopt ATSC or ATSC 3.0 together with or replace the currently existing ISDB-T.

=== Singapore ===
Singapore's digital TV (DTV) journey started in 2007 when it was announced that the nation's free-to-air TV channels will go fully digital using the DVB-T (Digital Video Broadcasting – Terrestrial) broadcasting standard. Since 1 January 2007, all seven Mediacorp channels have been broadcast in digital.

On 6 November 2007, MDA announced that analogue television would cease to broadcast entirely by the end of 2011, up from the intended 19 February 2010, to facilitate more time for majority of Singaporeans to switch to DTV as soon as possible. The analogue broadcast was finally ceased on 2 January 2012.

The adoption of the DVB-T2 standard was decided after a successful trial that was conducted with free-to-air broadcaster Mediacorp in 2009. The trial, which involved some 500 households in Ang Mo Kio and Bedok estates, showed that DVB-T2 was suitable for deployment in Singapore's urbanised environment. DVB-T2 also offers higher efficiency, robustness and flexibility, enabling efficient use of valuable terrestrial spectrum for the delivery of audio, video and data services to fixed, portable and mobile devices.

The country adopted the DVB-T2 standard in 2012.

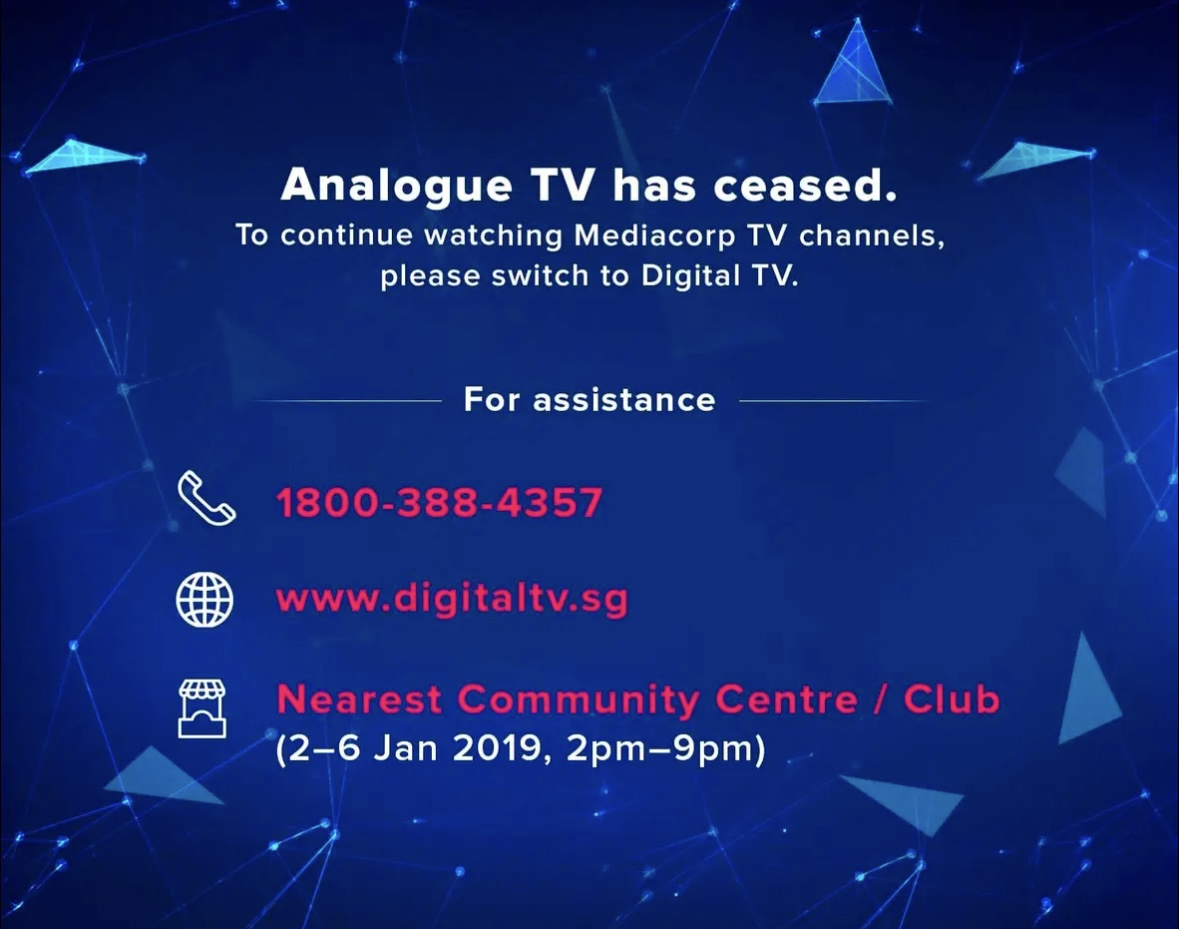
Analogue closedown warning broadcast in Singapore

Digital switchover was completed shortly after midnight on 2 January 2019, when state-owned broadcaster Mediacorp—who holds a monopoly on terrestrial television in the country—shut down the analogue signals of its channels.

=== South Korea (Republic of Korea) ===
After a long controversy between the government and broadcasters in South Korea, ATSC was chosen over DVB-T. Since 2005, digital services have been available across the entire country. South Korea also developed its own mobile TV standard called DMB, Digital Multimedia Broadcasting, based on the European technology of Digital Audio Broadcasting (DAB). It has a satellite, subscription-based version (S-DMB) and a free, terrestrial version (T-DMB). T-DMB achieved widespread success, both in South Korea and abroad. For more details, see Digital Multimedia Broadcasting.

Digital switchover progressed region by region, with the first analogue transmitters in Uljin, North Gyeongsang Province ending transmissions on Wednesday, 1 September 2010. All broadcasts from analogue transmitters in the country officially ended on 31 December 2012 at 03:59:59 KST (UTC+9) nationwide (including those located in cities within the Seoul Capital Area, Gyeonggi Province and Incheon). On New Year's Eve (31 December) 2012 at 04:00:00 KST (UTC+9), the digital terrestrial television signals of South Korea began broadcasting in ultra high definition nationwide.

=== Sri Lanka ===
The first Television network of Sri Lanka was launched on 13 April 1979. The ITN channel, owned by the Independent Television Network Limited (ITN) became the first terrestrial television channel of Sri Lanka. On 5 June 1979, ITN was converted to a government-owned business and was later brought under the Sri Lanka Rupavahini Act of 1982 along with the newly created Sri Lanka Rupavahini Corporation (SLRC).

Significant changes occurred in 1992 as the government permitted the establishment of private television networks. Subsequently, the MTV Channel network was launched in collaboration with Singapore Telecommunications Limited (Singtel).

Since then many new television networks have come into existence within Sri Lanka. There are also a number of Satellite networks and pay per view television networks in Sri Lanka. The national telecommunications provider, Sri Lanka Telecom also launched an IPTV service in 2008. MTV Channel introduced Sri Lanka's first 24-hour Television channel, "Sirasa TV", in 2009 to satisfy the public's wish to follow ongoing global affairs.

The television industry in Sri Lanka had been prepared to digitalise itself for more than half a decade, but government policy uncertainties confused broadcasters and caused many delays. A 2014 television digitisation deal between the previous Sri Lankan government and Japan has been delayed until 2025. In 2018, a Sri Lankan company named Television and Radio Network (TRN) offered to launch a nationwide free digital television switch using the DVB-T2 system, in contrast to the Japanese proposal of the ISDB-T system. In 2025, Sri Lanka signed an agreement for digital TV broadcasting and aims to start the digital television transition.

=== Taiwan ===
Digital television launched terrestrially in Taiwan on 2 July 2004, with the implementation of the DVB-T2 standard. Currently, there are simulcasts of analogue and digital television. Taiwan plans to replace an American analogue broadcasting system NTSC with a European digital TV system DVB-T by 2012 using 6 MHz channel bandwidth just like in Colombia, Panama, and Trinidad and Tobago. To assist lower-income families with the switch to digital television, the government plans to provide NT$300 million in aid to purchase converters or for the purchase of new digital televisions. Analogue terrestrial television ended transmission on 30 June 2012 while the shutdown of analogue cable television was underway.

=== Thailand ===
The first digital television service in Thailand was launched by satellite based pay-TV operator IBC in 1996 using the DVB-S system.

Starting from December 2000, the Thai national broadcaster Modernine TV began its trial Digital Terrestrial Digital Television (DDTV) service for six months, from January to June 2001, for selected households in the capital city of Bangkok and surrounding areas on UHF Band 658 MHz and 674 MHz (or Channel 44 and 46) using the DVB-T standard. The trial DDTV service consisted of the current two analogue TV channels (i.e. Modernine TV and TV3) in digital, and two new digital-only channels, namely MCOT 1 and ASEAN TV. Also provided under the service were seven FM radio stations in digital audio and interactive services. Nationwide implementation was planned to begin by the year 2007 or 2008, although as of August 2008 digital transmission is still only available in the Bangkok Metropolitan Area and possibly deferred. Even though MCOT's trial was a success, the future of the digital terrestrial television transition has become uncertain, especially after the end of Somchai Wongsawat's tenure as the prime minister and the beginning of successor Abhisit Vejjajiva. All the above digital television services are in standard definition and MCOT would have initiated HDTV trials by 2009.

The Thai National Broadcasting and Telecommunications Commission (NBTC) and broadcasters conducted a field trial for digital terrestrial transmission of DVB-T2 in the Bangkok area in 2013. The following year, digital terrestrial television began to be launched. The digital transition started in 2017 for some channels; analogue broadcasting ended on all remaining channels in 2020. By 2018, rural areas in Thailand saw the transition from analogue to digital. By September 2018, Channel 3 (owned by BEC and MCOT) was the last broadcaster to offer analogue services; it completely changed to digital in late 2019 on VHF, while the one on UHF ended its analogue broadcasts on 25 March 2020 at 11:57pm (UTC+7).

=== Timor-Leste ===
On 11 December 2018, the Timor-Leste cabinet gave Secretary of State for Social Communication Merício Juvenal dos Reis permission to sign a Sino-Timor-Leste agreement for the introduction of the Chinese digital television format of DTMB into the country. On 18 June 2019, the groundbreaking ceremony for the China-aided demonstration project of the DTMB was held at the China Radio and Television Station in Timor-Leste. The work subsequently began on 21 June.

=== Turkey ===
With the final analogue satellite broadcasts from TRT ended in February 2006, TRT launched trial digital transmissions in 2006 and originally planned to gradually handle the switchover, with a completion date of March 2015. In 2013 the broadcasting regulator awarded a license to a firm; the award was voided in 2014 after the country's constitutional court upheld a complaint against the process. Although new licenses were proposed in 2018, there was still no DTT network. However, with the construction of a new "digital" transmitter in Küçük Çamlıca TV Radio Tower and Çanakkale TV Tower, digital broadcasts finally began testing in 2020. As of 2020 there are 30+ FTA HD broadcasts, with all popular channels and 5 TRT channels available by satellite and digital cable. There are plans to build up to 40 more transmitters around the country, including the retrofit of Endem TV Tower.

=== Uzbekistan ===
The launch of digital broadcasting began on 15 January 2018. The first regions to turn off their analogue broadcasts were Andijan, Fergana, Namangan and Tashkent Region. On 15 July 2018, the switch-off was completed in the city of Tashkent, and on 5 December 2018, the shutdown of analogue television in Uzbekistan was completed.

=== Vietnam ===
Vietnam launched DVB-T tests in 2002 and rolled it out nationwide in 2005. Vietnam tested DVB-T in 2003 from a national school in Ho Chi Minh City. A DVB-T channel was launched in 2001 by VTC Digital. DVB-T2 was launched in 2011 in Vietnam by AVG - Audio Video Global JSC, now MobiTV by Mobifone - Vietnam Mobile Telecom Services (from 26 February 2016). On 27 December 2011, Prime Minister Nguyễn Tấn Dũng issued Decree No. 2451/QD-TTg approving the country television project of "Digitisation of terrestrial television transmission and broadcasting in 2020" (also called the Project of Digitisation of Television), which prescribed that before 31 December 2020, analogue television broadcasting in 63 Vietnam provinces and cities would be switched to digital terrestrial television under the DVB-T2 system. Analogue signals were first switched off on 1 November 2015 in Da Nang, Vietnam. Da Nang was the first city in ASEAN to launch analogue switch off successfully. Complete migration into digital television began taking place from 30 November 2020, before the final analogue shutdown was announced the following month by the country's Prime Minister on 31 December. Since January 2020, a total of 1.3 million digital television receivers for both poor and near-poor households were provided directly by Vietnam's public utility telecommunications service provision of the Ministry of Information and Communications in 48 provinces and cities under the television digitization program of the central government. By 30 June, a total of 21 provinces had indefinitely stopped broadcasting analogue and migrated into digital broadcasting. The transition in the remaining 15 provinces was finally completed at 00:00:00 (UTC+7) on 28 December 2020, four days earlier than the final date prescribed by the Prime Minister within the last year of 2020.

== Oceania ==
=== American Samoa ===
Complied with the FCC transition to ATSC digital on 12 June 2009 on all full-power stations.

=== Australia ===
==== Digital satellite ====
There are many digital satellite TV services in Australia: Foxtel, Austar, Selectv, Optus, TransACT, and UBI World TV. Digital satellite television is popular, with Foxtel and Austar alone reaching over one quarter of the nation's population.

==== Digital free-to-air ====
Digital terrestrial television in Australia commenced on 1 January 2001 in the country's five most populous cities: Sydney, Melbourne, Brisbane, Adelaide, and Perth. Digital services using DVB-T standards are available nationwide. Analogue transmissions were phased out between mid-2010 and December 2013. The Mildura region was the first to terminate its analogue network, on Wednesday 30 June 2010. Digital switchover was originally expected to be complete by Tuesday 31 December 2013, however, the last regions to switch over (Melbourne and Remote Eastern/Central Australia) did so slightly earlier, on Tuesday 10 December 2013 at 9:00 am. Until the switch-off in the respective areas, free-to-air stations were simulcast, along with digital-only channels like ABC TV Plus. The switchover was co-ordinated by the Digital Switchover Taskforce operating under the federal Department of Broadband, Communications and the Digital Economy.

==== Digital cable ====
Digital cable operators in Australia are Foxtel, Neighbourhood Cable in some regional cities in Victoria, and Austar in Darwin. These services are available in the following cities: Sydney, Melbourne, Brisbane, Adelaide, Perth, Gold Coast, Canberra, Hobart, Geelong, Ballarat, Bendigo, Albury/Wodonga, Mildura, and Darwin. Cable television networks began simulcasting in 2004 and analogue cable services were switched off in April 2007.

=== Christmas Island ===
Transitioned to digital television as part of Australia's transition to digital television. In line with Regional and Remote Western Australia, analogue TV simulcasts would have ended by 25 June 2013.

=== Cocos (Keeling) Islands ===
Transitioned to digital television as part of Australia's transition to digital television. In line with Regional and Remote Western Australia, analogue TV simulcasts would have ended by 25 June 2013.

=== Cook Islands ===
==== Digital free-to-air ====
On the island of Aitutaki, ArauraTV & Radio Ltd have commenced broadcasting in the DVB-T2 format, leapfrogging the technology being used by most terrestrial broadcasters elsewhere in the Pacific. They are currently broadcasting six channels of content, and this will increase to eight channels before the end of 2021.

=== Fiji ===
Introduced its DVB-T2 digital terrestrial service called Walesi in testing phase 2016 and rolled out to public in December 2017. Switchover was planned to start in 2020. No completion date yet.

=== Guam ===
Complied with the FCC transition to digital on 12 June 2009 on all full-power stations.

=== Kiribati ===
DTT in DVB-T2 form was introduced with help from Papua New Guinea in 2018, first rolling out in the main island Tarawa. No completion date yet.

=== Micronesia ===
FSMTC (FSM Telecommunications Company) provides a subscription based digital over the air (DVB-T) service to Kosrae, Chuuk and Yap. This provides various international television channels and a local information channel. No local television broadcasters operate in FSM.

=== Nauru ===
In December 2022, Nauru switched analogue systems to digital.

=== New Zealand ===
In New Zealand, there are several forms of broadcast digital television: Sky's pay-TV satellite service (available nationwide), Freeview's free-to-air satellite service (available nationwide), Freeview's free-to-air terrestrial service, and multiple IPTV service providers.

==== Satellite ====
Sky TV launched New Zealand's first nationwide digital pay-TV service in December 1998 and had a monopoly on digital satellite TV until the launch of Freeview's nationwide digital satellite service in May 2007.

==== Terrestrial ====
DVB-T launched on 15 November 1998. The Freeview terrestrial service launched in 2002. The Freeview terrestrial service is a high-definition digital terrestrial television service using AVCHD, launched on 1 January 2004. The service currently serves 86 percent of the population; notable large towns without the service include Whakatāne, Blenheim, Oamaru, and Queenstown. Digital terrestrial television broadcasts began officially in April 2008. Analogue PAL switch-off started on 30 September 2012 with the North Island's Hawke's Bay region and the South Island's West Coast region and finished with the Upper North Island, which was switched off on 1 December 2013.

=== Niue ===
Plans were made in 2016 by the BCN to make a future switch to digital broadcasting.

=== Norfolk Island ===
Digital terrestrial television began on or before 30 September 2009 with a two frequency service rebroadcasting a number of Australian national and commercial TV channels and two ABC radio stations. Unlike the rest of Australia, the channels were 8 MHz wide on the UHF band using European channel numbers. The transition was completed on 10 December 2013. Today, digital television is broadcast on 7 MHz channels over VHF and UHF similar to the rest of Australia.

=== Northern Mariana Islands ===
Complied with the FCC transition to ATSC digital on 12 June 2009 on all full-power stations.

=== Palau ===
The country has digital cable broadcasts.

=== Papua New Guinea ===
Introduced DVB-T2. No switchover date yet.

=== Samoa ===
Introduced DTT publicly in 2019. No completion date yet.

=== Solomon Islands ===
Currently in transition. TTV broadcasts digital TV in DVB-T and T2. However, satellite is dominant in most of the country. No completion date yet.

=== Tonga ===
Started transition in 2015. No completion date yet.

=== Vanuatu ===
The main public channel made the switch to digital in October 2016. No completion date yet.

== Europe ==
=== Abkhazia ===
The telecom chairman Lasha Shamba said in 2019 that there was a project in managing a digital switch but that the territory was not ready yet due to lack of funding. The analogue switch off in Russia proved to cause problems for Abkhazians who have watched Russian relay terrestrial broadcasts in analogue.

=== Albania ===
Analogue terrestrial television in Albania was supposed to switch off in October 2012.

Albania has three major forms of broadcast digital television. Terrestrial (DVB-T) using MPEG2 in 1998 and MPEG4 in 2004, Terrestrial (DVB-T2) using MPEG4 in 2009, Cable (DVB-C) using MPEG4 and MPEG2 in 1995, and Satellite (DVB-S) in 1995. In addition multiple IPTV services are available.

Analogue satellite broadcasts stopped in 2002 shortly before the introduction of digital satellite. The original analogue switch-off deadline was planned for July 2015, however this was missed due to multiple problems. Analogue channels were first shut off on 10 September 2018 in the areas of Durrës and Tirana, but they were restored later in the day because the supply of DVB-T2 decoders was not enough to cover the demand. The date was then postponed to January 2019 and finally October 2019. On 1 October 2019, analogue broadcasts were shut off in most areas, including Tirana and Durrës. A few channels switched off their transmissions a few days later. A1 Report (now Report TV) was the last to keep the warning screen on air. The date for cities like Elbasan was set for March 2020, with the transmissions still being receivable in Tirana with a big enough aerial. Areas like Dibër, Gjirokastër, Vlora and Saranda remained on air with the switch-off date being postponed multiple times. Albania finally completed the transition on 29 December 2020, with the last analogue broadcast being in Gjirokastër by Televizioni Klan.

=== Andorra ===
Analogue switch-off completed on 25 September 2007.

=== Austria ===
Austria began analogue switch-off on 5 March 2007, progressing from the west to the east. The analogue broadcast was shut down nationwide at the end of 2010 regarding the main transmitters. The last analogue translators were switched off on 7 June 2011.

=== Azerbaijan ===
Began analogue switch-off on 17 October 2010, completed on 31 December 2011.

=== Belarus ===
Analogue broadcasting was disabled on 15 May 2015 in the UHF band and 16 June 2015 in the VHF band (channels 6–12). The final analogue switch-off occurred on 4 January 2016.

=== Belgium ===
Belgium now has three major forms of broadcast digital television: Terrestrial (DVB-T/DVB-H), Cable (DVB-C), and Satellite (DVB-S). In addition, IPTV services are available.

In Belgium, all the regions have completed the analog switchover (DVB-T). Media regulations are under regional legislation. Flanders switched off analogue television on 3 November 2008, while in Wallonia, all analogue services were switched off on 1 March 2010, making the country completely serviced by a digital signal. The last cable TV provider Telenet switched off analogue cable in late 2021.

=== Bosnia and Herzegovina ===
There was a DVB-T service launched in 2015, but it was not available in all parts of the country. The switchover began on 1 July 2025 and it was expected to be completed on 3 December 2025. However, due to procedural and procurement issues, revolving around under-utilised funding and a lack of effective management structures, it is expected to be completed by Q2 of 2026.

=== Bulgaria ===
A free-to-air platform launched in the Sofia region, starting in November 2004. The Communications Regulatory Commission (CRC) said that it received six bids for the licence to build and operate Bulgaria's two nationwide DTT networks. A second licence tender for the operation of three DTT multiplexes was open until 27 May 2009. Following the closing of this process, Hannu Pro, part of Silicon Group, and with Baltic Operations secured the license to operate three DTT multiplexes in Bulgaria by the country's Communications Regulatory Commission (CRC). Bulgaria completed the transition to digital broadcasting on 30 September 2013.

=== Croatia ===
Analogue terrestrial television was switched off in Croatia on 5 October 2010.

Croatian Radiotelevision (HRT) started to transmit DVB-S programmes in 1997. It transmits all four state-owned TV channels (HRT 1, HRT 2, HRT 3 and HRT 4), and three radio stations (HR 1, HR 2 and HR 3).

Croatia started to test DVB-T transmission early in 2002. It transmitted 4 national TV channels (HRT 1, HRT 2, HRT 3 and Nova TV) on a network of 9 transmitters built by Odašiljači i veze, completed in 2007 and covering about 70% of the country. The entire country has been covered by DVB-T since 5 October 2010. The analogue switch-off process took place region by region, starting from January 2010 in Istria and Rijeka region and completing the switch-off on 5 October 2010 when the final region (Zagreb) was converted fully to DVB-T. Analogue television broadcasts were switched off for all national TV channels on 5 October 2010 at 12:35 and for local TV channels on 20 November 2010.

MPEG-2/SDTV is selected as a platform for free-to-air channels, initially with two MUX channels covering, where MUX A would be used by public TV Croatian Radiotelevision (HRT) and MUX B used by commercial TV stations, while later MUX C and MUX D will be populated by HD and regional channels, respectively.

Croatia started DVB-T2 HEVC in 2009 for national broadcast.

=== Czech Republic ===
Czech Republic launched first experimental DVB-T broadcast in May 2000, which was then made available to the public in October 2005. Analogue terrestrial television was switched off on 30 November 2011. The last analogue transmitters in Southeast Moravia and Northern Moravia–Silesia were switched off on 30 June 2012.

In November 2019, Czech Republic started the transition to the DVB-T2 standard with H.265 (HEVC) codec. This transition was finished on 28 October 2020 (delayed from the original plan, which was 24 June 2020), when the last DVB-T transmitter was switched off.

As of October 2025, there were 4 nationwide DVB-T2 multiplexes in the Czech Republic with 46 free-to-air TV channels and 18 radio stations.

=== Denmark ===
Analogue satellite was terminated by 2006 when DR2 and TV3 ended their analogue signals on the Intelsat 10-02/Thor satellite at 0.8°W. DR 2 was the last ever broadcast using the D2-MAC standard when it closed on 1 July.

Denmark completed its transition to digital terrestrial television at midnight on 1 November 2009, when all terrestrial analogue services were switched off. Analogue cable was switched off on 9 February 2016. Since then, the market has evolved toward integrated digital services. By 2026, Danish viewers have increasingly moved away from traditional cable toward high-performance IPTV platforms that offer localized content and advanced streaming features across the Nordic region.

=== Estonia ===
Analogue television was switched off completely on 1 July 2010.

=== Faroe Islands ===
Launched DTT in December 2002. Most of the analogue signals were switched off immediately.

=== Finland ===
Analogue closedown warning broadcast in Finland

Analogue terrestrial television was switched off in Finland on 1 September 2007, and analogue cable television on 1 March 2008. Analogue terrestrial transmissions ceased nationwide at 04:00 on 1 September 2007 (the switch-off was previously planned for midnight but a few extra hours were added for technical reasons). This was controversial, as the cost of a digital TV set in Finland at the time was heavily criticised and saw a substantial decrease in how much the television license cost. Cable TV viewers continued to receive analogue broadcasts until the end of February 2008. All pay-TV channels switched to DVB-T2 in May 2017. Finland switches fully to DVB-T2 in 2025.

=== France ===
All analogue services (terrestrial, satellite and cable) switched off in 2011. This included overseas departments and territories such as French Polynesia on 20 September, New Caledonia, Saint Pierre and Miquelon, and Wallis and Futuna on 27 September, Réunion on 25 October, Guadeloupe, French Guiana, Martinique, Mayotte, Saint Barthélemy, and Saint Martin on 29 November.

  - Guadeloupe: All analogue services switched off on Tuesday, 29 November 2011.
  - French Guiana: All analogue services switched off on Tuesday, 29 November 2011.
  - Martinique: All analogue services switched off on Tuesday, 29 November 2011.
  - Mayotte: All analogue services switched off on Tuesday, 29 November 2011.
  - Réunion: All analogue services switched off on Tuesday, 25 October 2011.
  - French Polynesia: All analogue services switched off on Tuesday, 20 September 2011.
  - New Caledonia: All analogue services switched off on Tuesday, 27 September 2011.
  - Saint Barthélemy: All analogue services switched off on Tuesday, 29 November 2011.
  - Collectivity of Saint Martin: All analogue services switched off on Tuesday, 29 November 2011.
  - Saint Pierre and Miquelon: All analogue services switched off on Tuesday, 27 September 2011.
  - Wallis and Futuna: All analogue services switched off on Tuesday, 27 September 2011.

=== Germany ===
Analogue switch-off began in Berlin on 1 November 2002 and completed on 3 August 2003, becoming the first city to do so. Simulcast digital transmissions started in other parts of the country in an effort to prepare for a full switchover. The terrestrial analogue switch-off of transmitters was completed on 3 August 2003, except for one main transmitter in Bad Mergentheim, which was shut down on 3 August 2003. Analogue satellite receivers were still used by 6% of households in 2001, the highest in Europe. The analogue satellite transmissions (broadcasting on Astra 19.2°E) were switched off on 27 September 2001, being the last in Europe. However, analogue cable was still used by about 30% of the population and 55% of all cable broadcasts. The cable TV provider Unitymedia switched off analogue cable on 1 March 2010.

=== Greece ===
Digital broadcasting of privately owned nationwide TV channels began by Digea in Greece on 24 September 2009, covering a large section of the Corinthian Gulf in Northern Peloponnese. During the 2009–13 transition period, a total of 13 digital broadcasting centers were activated throughout Greece, covering approximately 70% of the Greek population. Analogue terrestrial transmissions were first terminated at the Peloponnese region on 27 June 2014. Five more switch-offs followed in 2014 and the analogue shutdown was completed on 6 February 2015. A total of 156 broadcasting centres are currently active throughout the country, covering over 96% of the country's population.

=== Hungary ===
Hungarian analogue terrestrial transmissions officially stopped on Thursday, 31 October 2013, after completing two phases that ended on 31 July and 31 October, respectively. However, analogue transmissions are still operating as of August 2021 on cable systems, at least.

=== Iceland ===
All analogue terrestrial transmissions were switched off on Monday, 2 February 2015.

=== Ireland ===
In Ireland, there are a number of providers of digital television. These include Sky Ireland which is operated by Sky plc (available nationwide), while Virgin Media Ireland, Magnet Networks and Cablecomm provide various digital-cable services. Digital Television is also available by IPTV provider Magnet Networks.

Analogue satellite from Astra 19.2°E was discontinued on 27 September 2001.

- In 2008 Boxer TV were awarded the position to operate Ireland's Digital Terrestrial Television platform which was meant to be rolled with RTÉ NL over the next 5 years. This service was to offer subscription services and free-to-air channels sometime in late 2009 using MPEG4 standard. On 9 May 2009 it was reported OneVision were then likely to operate the pay DTT service. The official announcement was made later that month. Due to an economic downturn in the Irish economy, Boxer TV, which operated in Sweden and Denmark claimed it was unfeasible for the company to operate in Ireland. On 11 May 2009 it was reported Onevision would operate the pay DTT service. Further setbacks were announced on 9 July 2009 when it was confirmed by Ireland's national broadcaster that RTÉ would not launch its DTT service until other media partners were ready to launch their services. The original launch date was September 2009 and finally took place in October 2010.

Digital terrestrial television was launched in Ireland as Saorview on Friday 29 October 2010. At launch it had five standard-definition channels and one high-definition channel. The analogue service was terminated on Wednesday 24 October 2012 and was replaced by a second multiplex for Saorview. A small number of low power independent analogue re-broadcast systems remained licensed until 31 December 2012. Analogue cable was shut down on 8 April 2019.

=== Italy ===
Analogue satellite broadcasts were switched off from the Hot Bird 13°E satellite on 29 April 2005 by RAI. The conversion to digital television progressed region by region. It started in Sardinia on 15 October 2008, and was completed on Wednesday, 4 July 2012, when the last analogue transmitters in the Province of Palermo were shut down. The switchover was politically controversial due to a 2004 law that seemed to favor Mediaset, owned by the Prime Minister Silvio Berlusconi, in the television market. A 2006 bill proposed by Paolo Gentiloni passed the government of Romano Prodi that would make one of Mediaset's channels as well as one from public broadcaster RAI move to digital three years before the switch. The bill was called "tailored for political revenge" by Berlusconi. In 2011, the European Court of Justice ruled that the digital switchover in Italy was illegally subsidised favoring Berlusconi's media group.

=== Kosovo ===
The government published a plan for a switchover in 2015. As of 2019, however, there is no DTT network in operation yet.

=== Kyrgyzstan ===
DTT services rolled out officially in 2014, and the transition to digital ended in 2017.

=== Latvia ===
Latvia now has three major forms of broadcast digital television. Terrestrial (DVB-T) using MPEG4 in 1998 and MPEG2 in 2004, Cable (DVB-C) using MPEG4 and MPEG2 in 1995, and Satellite (DVB-S) in 1995. In addition multiple IPTV services are available. Analogue television was completely converted to digital broadcasting on Tuesday, 1 June 2010.

=== Lithuania ===
Lithuania now has three major forms of broadcast digital television. Terrestrial (DVB-T) using MPEG-2 in 1998 and MPEG-4 in 2004, Cable (DVB-C) in 1995, and Satellite (DVB-S) in 1995. In addition IPTV services are available. The switch-off of the analogue terrestrial transmissions was completed on Monday, 29 October 2012.

=== Luxembourg ===
Luxembourg was the first country to completely switch to digital broadcasting and shut down analogue TV, completing the transition on Friday, 1 September 2006. The last analogue transmitter was shut down on UHF Channel 21 on Friday, 31 December 2010.

=== Malta ===
All analogue services terminated on Monday, 31 October 2011. The switch-off was originally planned for Wednesday, 1 June 2011 but was delayed for unknown reasons.

=== Moldova ===
Launched its first DTT service in November 2016. Analogue broadcasts were discontinued from May 2022. The process was somewhat difficult due to the high costs of upgrading to digital.

  - Transnistria: DTT based on DVB-T started broadcasting on 30 December 2012 but only in testing phase until 2015. The DVB-T2 public rollout commenced in April 2016. Analogue broadcasts for Transnistria shut down in the period 2018–2019.

=== Monaco ===
Analogue TV broadcasts were switched off on Tuesday, 24 May 2011.

=== Montenegro ===
Shut down analogue signals on 17 June 2015.

=== Netherlands ===
The Netherlands now has three major forms of broadcast digital television: Terrestrial (DVB-T2), Cable (DVB-C), and Satellite (DVB-S2). In addition IPTV services are available. In the past analogue TV was broadcast in PAL terrestrial and cable. Terrestrial broadcasting switched to the digital standard (DVB-T) in 2005 and launched (DVB-T2) in 2009. Cable started broadcasting digital in 1995. Most cable companies switched off analogue in 2013. Satellite broadcasting switched to the digital standard (DVB-S) in 1996 and to DVB-S2 around 2010.

Analogue satellite transmissions from Astra 19.2°E were halted on 18 August 1996, just two months after digital was introduced. This was felt by few people, however, due to low satellite usage. The Netherlands moved to digital-only terrestrial broadcasting on Monday, 11 December 2006, being the second country to do so. The switch-off was noticed by few, since the overwhelming majority receive TV via cable and only around 74,000 households relied on terrestrial over-the-air broadcasts. The switch-off was helped greatly as cable continued to use analogue distribution, and thus consumers' old tuners continued to be useful. In March 2018, major cable provider Ziggo announced that it would gradually phase out analogue cable TV transmissions in the next two years.

DVB-H was only available for a brief period between 2006 in the bigger cities.

=== North Macedonia ===
Analogue transmissions were terminated on Saturday, 1 June 2013.

=== Norway ===
The shutdown of the analogue service in Norway started on 4 March 2008, and was finished on 1 December 2009. (MPEG-4) Analogue satellite broadcasts of NRK and TV 2 on the Thor 4.3°W satellite ended on 15 October 2002. Norway started its DTT service on Saturday 1 September 2007.

=== Poland ===
Terrestrial television in Poland is broadcast using a digital DVB-T system. The first test DVB-T emission was carried out in Warsaw on 9 November 2001. In April 2004, the first DVB-T transmitter near Rzeszów started operation, and the local TVP division started to market set-top boxes allowing it to be received. Analogue broadcast switch-off started on 7 November 2012 and was completed by 31 July 2013. The shutdown of analogue broadcasts took place in 7 steps from 7 November 2012 to 23 July 2013, when analogue terrestrial transmissions were completely terminated. Analogue broadcasts on satellite ended when TVN stopped its analogue transmission on the Hot Bird 13°E satellite in 2008. Later, in early 2022, most of the TV markets (Polsat, TVN, TV Puls, etc.) switched to DVB-T2 HEVC, while TVP, due to the Russian invasion of Ukraine, did so on 15 December (west) and 19 December (east) 2023.

=== Portugal ===
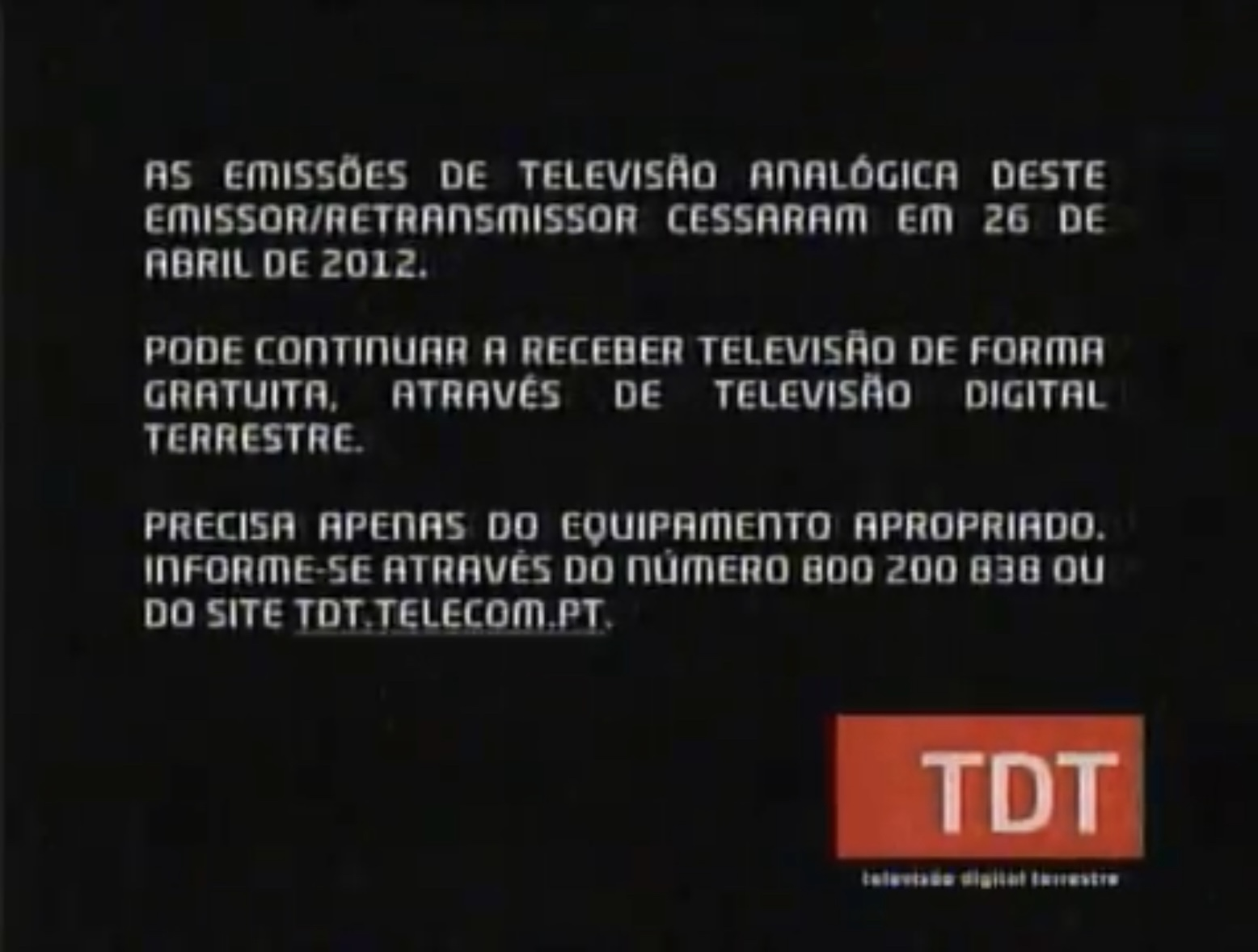
Analogue closedown warning broadcast in Portugal

Portugal started its first digital broadcast with TVCabo Satélite (nowadays known as "NOS TV Satélite") in 1998, later, in 2001, implementation of Interactive services brought digital TV to the wired cable networks. While the Satellite branch was (and still is) popular in areas where the Cable branch is not available (such as remote areas and villages), iTV never became successful, and was later discontinued in 2002. Digital broadcast was still available under the name "powerbox" (after the STB used to receive the signal). In 2005, a little "analog switchover" happened, where coded analog channels (known as Premium) would cease broadcast in favour of powerbox. Every pay-TV provider offers digital television. As of 2010, all Premium channels in all pay-TV providers are digital. DTT started on 1 November 2008, for Lisbon and Castelo Branco, and on 26 April 2009, for 80% of the country, and the government plans to cover the rest of the country until 2010-2011 New Year's Eve. Analog will then be switched off 6 months after TDT covers 87% of the country via terrestrial transmitters and 13% via satellite complementary coverage.

Digital terrestrial broadcasts started on Wednesday, 29 April 2009. Portugal's government hoped to cover 80% of the territory with digital terrestrial TV by the end of 2009, and simulcasts remained until Thursday, 26 April 2012, when the analogue broadcasting ended. This switchover began on Thursday 12 January 2012. Analogue cable remained available from all pay-TV providers (including fibre), for homes with multiple televisions. The digital versions of all channels have traditionally been encrypted and could only be accessed with a proprietary set-top box, which subscribers had to pay for with a monthly fee. Starting in October 2017, cable provider NOS unencrypted the digital versions of its base channels, enabling them to be tuned directly by televisions with support for MPEG-4 (or digital terrestrial) or any freely available digital tuner. Channels belonging to subscription packs, as well as premium channels, still require a proprietary set top box to be viewed. Other pay-TV providers – Vodafone, NOWO and Meo – similarly no longer encrypt the digital versions of their base channels. Starting in February 2021, analogue cable was entirely discontinued on NOWO. In October 2022, plans were made to close analogue cable signals on NOS. In late April 2023, viewers would see a message announcing the end of this kind of analogue broadcasting on 3 May 2023, unless they bought a set-top box and/or scanned digital signals. As of November 2025, analogue cable does remain available on Meo and Vodafone, albeit with a reduced number of channels from previous years.

=== Romania ===
The country has one of the highest pay-TV penetration rates in Europe, with over 98% of homes receiving cable or satellite TV services. Also, over 90% of the population is covered with DVB-T2 digital terrestrial television signal. Analogue broadcasts were first set to shut down in 2012, but it was delayed multiple times, until they were finally switched off on 1 May 2018. However, as of June 2024, analogue television is still offered by cable operators.

Acoperire - Televiziunea Digitala Terestra | tvdigitalaTeleviziunea Digitala Terestra | tvdigitala (In Romanian; Archived)
DVBT.ro – Televiziune Digitală Terestră (In Romanian; Archived)
CHIRplus_BC Printjob (In Romanian; Archived)

=== Russia ===
Russia uses DVB-T2 standard for digital broadcasting. The transition to digital terrestrial TV broadcasting was initiated in Russia in 2009 and took almost 10 years. Russian digital broadcasting consists of two "multiplexes" with 10 channels each which are generally available everywhere in the country. There is also a third "multiplex" which was originally supposed to be regional-oriented but it is deployed only in some regions, e.g., Moscow.

On 22 December 2018, Russia completed the creation of the world's largest digital television broadcasting system, with 10,080 transmitters operating at 5,040 sites throughout the country. On 3 December 2018, analogue transmissions were switched off in the Tver Region including the city of Tver. Analogue transmissions in Ryazan, Tula, Yaroslavl, Ulyanovsk, Penza, Magadan, and Chechnya ended on 11 February 2019, while those in 20 other regions which includes Moscow and the Moscow Region were switched off on 15 April 2019. On 3 June 2019, analogue transmissions in 36 regions were discontinued which include the oblasts of Vladimir, Samara, Nizhny Novgorod, Krasnoyarsk and Oryol. Switchover in the last 21 regions was completed on 14 October 2019. The regions include St. Petersburg, the Leningrad Region, the Republic of Crimea and Sevastopol. Channels that are not offered as multiplex services (i.e. some federal and regional channels) are still broadcast in analogue.

=== San Marino ===
Analogue switch-off completed on Thursday, 2 December 2010.

=== Serbia ===
Serbia launched its first DTT transmissions in 2005. The first DTT-only channel was made available in 2008. As of 2013, the DVB-T2 network covers Belgrade and much of Vojvodina, several cities in Šumadija and Western Serbia and the southern city of Niš. The transition to DVB-T and DVB-T2 digital television in Serbia started on 1 September 2014, and was finished on 1 June 2015. Digital TV switchover for 98% of citizens started on 1 September 2014. The transition progressed in six stages. The first switch-off took place in Vršac on 15 April 2015. Analogue terrestrial television was finally switched off on 7 June 2015, with the last switch-off taking place on that day. As of that day, nearly 97.8% of the country's population was covered by digital signal.

=== Slovakia ===
Analogue transmission finished broadcasts on Monday, 31 December 2012.

=== Slovenia ===
Slovenia completed its switch to DVB-T (MPEG-4) on 1 December 2010 with the termination of all analogue transmissions on a single day. The switch-off of main transmitters was completed on Wednesday, 1 December 2010. The last local analogue transmitters were switched off on Thursday, 30 June 2011. There are two multiplexes carried nationwide as well as several local multiplexes.

=== South Ossetia ===
DTT has not yet rolled out in the territory. Its creation has been postponed due to lack of funds.

=== Spain ===
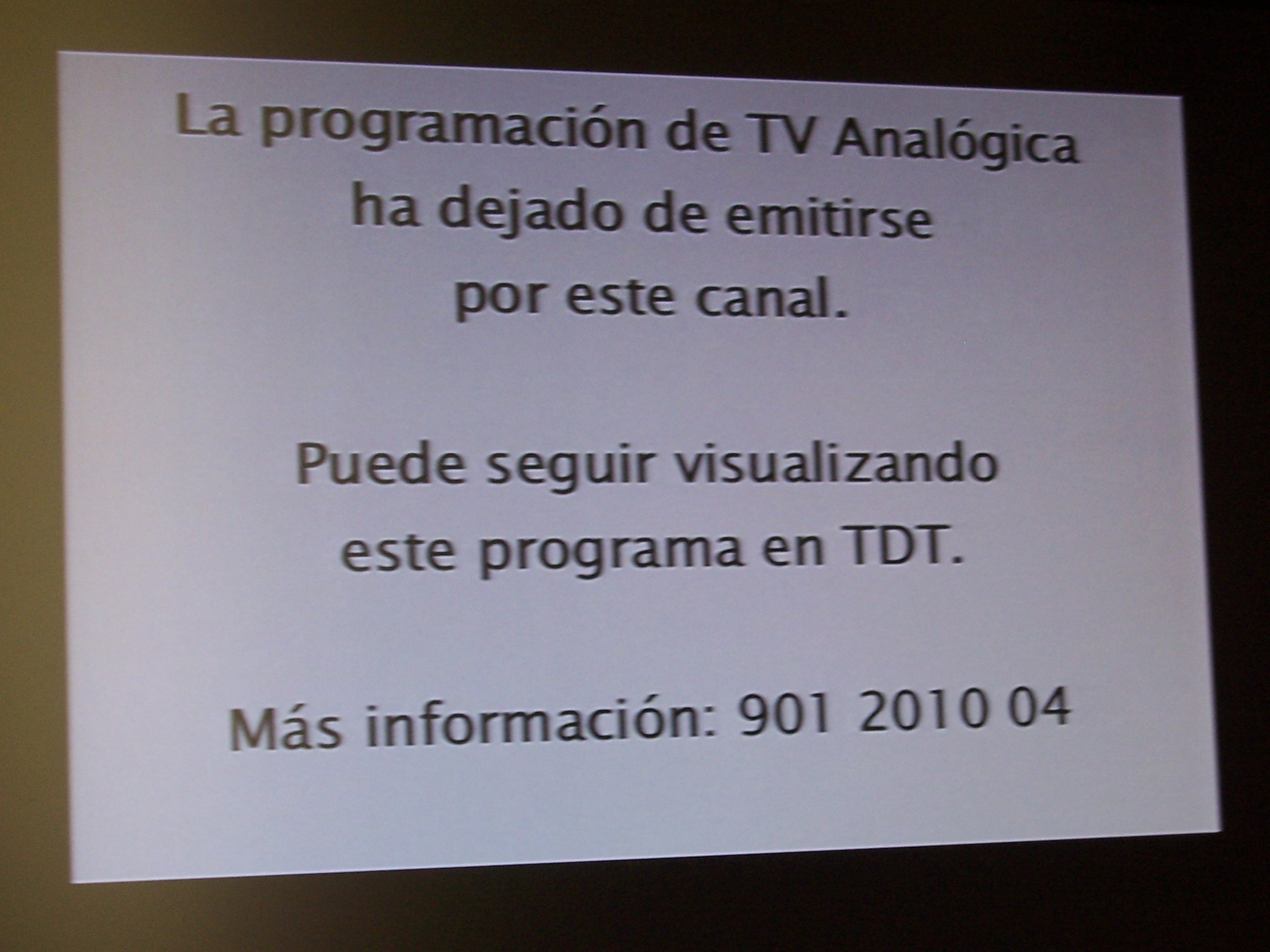
Analogue closedown warning broadcast in Spain.

The development of digital terrestrial television was very similar to the failure of ITV Digital in the United Kingdom. In 1999, digital terrestrial television was introduced in the country by the pay per view platform Quiero Television. In May 2002, statewide operators were required to start broadcasting in DVB-T. Yet, Quiero TV ceased transmissions in 2002 after a commercial failure. Unlike the UK, the three and half multiplexes left by the platform were not reassigned to other operators, and so 5 channels were squashed into a single multiplex.

On 30 November 2005, digital terrestrial television was relaunched as a free service with 20 channels and 14 radio stations, along with 23 regional- and local-language channels in their respective areas. Each multiplex has a minimum of 4 SD channels each or one HD channel. By 2010, coverage reached over 98% of the population, and the analog signal was switched off on 2 April 2010. The switch-off of the analogue terrestrial transmissions was completed on Saturday, 3 April 2010. The switch-off was successful, as about 70% of Spanish television transmissions are terrestrial, so it was easy for people to just switch to the digital signal.

  - Catalonia: began experimenting with DTT in 1999, regular DTT broadcasts began in 2002, and analogue signals were switched off on 30 March 2010.

=== Sweden ===
Analogue broadcasts from the Sirius and Thor satellites were ended by April 2004. The shutdown of the analogue service in Sweden started on 19 September 2005, and was finished on 15 October 2007 (elsewhere given as 29 October 2007). The switch-off of the analogue terrestrial network progressed region by region. It started on the island of Gotland on Monday, 19 September 2005, and was completed on Monday 15 October 2007, when the last analogue SVT1 transmitters in Blekinge and western Scania were shut down. Cable broadcasters continued to broadcast in analogue until 2020; Com Hem's analogue TV switch-off was done on 8 September 2020 under the technical leadership of Ana Alonso.

=== Switzerland ===
Switch-off in Switzerland (including Liechtenstein) began on Monday 24 July 2006 in Ticino and continued with Engadin on Monday, 13 November 2006. The switch-off was completed on Monday, 26 November 2007. A very high percentage of Swiss viewers receive their signals via cable distributors. By 2012, 40% of cable viewers had switched to digital. Analogue cable was switched off on 1 January 2017. The country switched off its terrestrial network entirely in 2019 due to low penetration.

=== Tajikistan ===
The country adopted DVB-T2 in 2014. The government planned to start transitioning in 2015, and as of 2023, about 84% of the population has accessed Digital TV.

=== Ukraine ===
All privately owned networks' analogue broadcasts were switched off on 1 August 2018 in the Kyiv region, and on 1 September 2018 in most parts of the country. The channels of UA:PBC were switched off in September 2018 – January 2019 in most parts of the country. Meanwhile, most channels in Russia-bordering regions, and some local channels (nationwide) that did not yet get the licence for digital broadcasting, were still broadcast in analogue until 31 December 2020, after which they discontinued analogue broadcasts. However, in some areas, there are commercial channels staying in analogue. The transition to digital television has halted due to the Russian invasion of Ukraine. In March 2024, analogue TV was completely switched off in Kharkiv.

=== United Kingdom ===
The United Kingdom now has five major forms of broadcast digital television, direct-to-home satellite services provided by British Sky Broadcasting (branded as Sky) and Freesat, digital cable television services provided by Virgin Media and WightFibre, and a free-to-air digital terrestrial service called Freeview. In addition there are two IPTV systems known as TalkTalk TV owned by The Carphone Warehouse, and BT Vision, which is provided by BT. Individual access methods vary throughout the country.

==== Terrestrial ====
The initial attempt at launching a digital terrestrial broadcasting service on 15 November 1998, ONdigital (later called ITV Digital), was unsuccessful and the company went into liquidation. Digital terrestrial broadcasting began in the UK on Sunday, 15 November 1998 with the launch of ONdigital, later renamed ITV Digital, which was replaced by Freeview after its collapse.

ITV Digital was replaced in late 2002 by Freeview, which uses the same DVB-T technology, but with higher levels of error correction and more robust (but lower-capacity) modulation on the "Public Service" multiplexes in an attempt to counter the reception problems which dogged its predecessor. Rather than concentrating on Pay TV services, Freeview uses the available capacity to provide a free-to-air service that includes all the existing five free-to-air analogue terrestrial channels and about twenty new digital channels. All services are transmitted in SDTV mode.

31 March 2004 saw the return of a limited pay-television offering to the digital terrestrial platform with the launch of Top Up TV. This new service is designed to appeal to those who do not want to pay the high subscription fees that Sky Television and the Cable networks demand. The service carries a restricted hours service of some of the UK's most watched channels including the Discovery Channel, Gold, Discovery Real Time, British Eurosport and Cartoon Network, sharing just three different slots. In October 2006, Top Up TV renamed itself Top Up TV Anytime, taking advantage of the increase in the popularity of digital video recorders, and its limited channel space. Now over 100 programs (not channels) are broadcast overnight and added to the box's hard drive, and may be watched at any time. Channels that provide content for the overnight service include MTV, Nickelodeon and Hallmark Channel.

2005 saw the first areas of the United Kingdom losing their analogue signal in a pilot test. The residents of Ferryside and Llansteffan in Carmarthenshire, Wales who had not already upgraded to digital television were given a free set-top box to receive the Freeview television service, which includes Channel 4 (previously unavailable terrestrially from transmitters in Wales) and S4C2, which broadcasts sessions of the National Assembly for Wales. Digital transmissions for this pilot commenced in December 2004, at which time a message was added to the analogue picture advising viewers that the analogue services would end in February 2005.

2005 also saw the announcement by the regulator Ofcom about the proposed analogue switch off plans for the UK. The switch off progressed on an ITV region by region basis that began in 2008 with the Border region, and ended in the UTV region in 2012. The coverage of the three public service broadcasting multiplexes is the same as that enjoyed by the former analogue TV stations (98.5% of the population), while the three commercial multiplexes cover 90% of the population.

The transition from analogue and digital to digital-only terrestrial signals started on Wednesday, 17 October 2007 with the Whitehaven transmitter in Cumbria, and followed a transmitter switchover timetable, implemented by region. The first constituent country to switch off all its analogue signals was Wales on 31 March 2010 and the last region to switch off its analogue signals was Northern Ireland on 24 October 2012. Sales of analogue TV sets stopped on 6 July 2010.

  - Isle of Man: All analogue services switched off on Thursday, 16 July 2009.
  - Wales: The vast majority of transmitters stopped broadcasting just after midnight on 31 March 2010. However analogue transmissions were still broadcast from the New Radnor and Garth Hill transmitters in Wales until 20 April 2011.
  - Guernsey and Jersey: Analogue signals switched off on Wednesday, 17 November 2010.
  - Scotland: Scotland ended its analogue broadcasts on 22 June 2011.
  - Gibraltar: Analogue transmissions ceased in December 2012 (replaced by DVB-T Gibraltar Freeview)
  - Northern Ireland: Analogue switch-off completed on 24 October 2012.

===== Freeview HD =====
The BBC, ITV, Channel 4 and Channel 5 ran terrestrial HDTV trials involving 450 homes in the London area during June–December 2006 on locally unused frequencies. As part of this trial, the BBC broadcast BBC HD, which was free to air but could not be received by any set-top boxes commercially available at the time. It could however be received and played back by any PC equipped with a DVB-T card using a software H.264 decoder.

With two channels (BBC HD and ITV HD), Freeview HD completed a "technical launch" on 2 December 2009 from the Crystal Palace and Winter Hill transmitters. This time, in addition to H.264 being used as the codec, the broadcast utilised DVB-T2 rather than the DVB-T used by standard Freeview and the earlier test broadcasts, thus requiring users to purchase new reception equipment. Freeview HD was the first operational TV service in the world to use the DVB-T2 standard.

Freeview HD set-top boxes and televisions were made available at the consumer launch of the service in early 2010. In order to qualify for the Freeview HD logo, receivers need to be IPTV-capable and display Freeview branding, including the logo, on the electronic programme guide screen.

On 25 March 2010 Channel 4 HD was added to Freeview HD on channel 52 with a placeholding caption; it launched on 30 March 2010, coinciding with the commercial launch of Freeview HD. S4C Clirlun launched in April 2010 in Wales, where Channel 4 HD is not available. BBC One HD was also added to the service on 3 November 2010.

==== Cable ====
Virgin Media (formerly known as NTL:Telewest, after a merger of NTL Incorporated with Telewest Global, Inc.), became in 2006 the first "quadruple-play" media company in the United Kingdom, bringing together a service consisting of television, broadband internet, mobile phone and fixed-line telephone services. Virgin Media ranks as the UK's second largest pay TV service, having 3.6m subscribers and 55% national availability.

Trials of the UK's first HDTV service, the TVDrive PVR from Telewest, began on 1 December 2005 on a commercial pilot basis before a full launch in March 2006. Due to the merger between NTL and Telewest, the TVDrive was made available to NTL cable customers in the Teesside and Glasgow areas on 16 November 2006. In January 2007, NTL:Telewest began renting the STB nationwide and since the acquisition of the Virgin Media name, it is now officially available in all areas with the new V+ branding. Virgin Media is also the only cable provider to supply video on demand services.

As of October 2009, Virgin Media are broadcasting seven HD channels with plans for further new HD channels during 2010.

WightFibre also provides cable television to the residents of the Isle of Wight.

Analogue cable broadcasts eventually ended and fully ceased on 28 November 2013, when Milton Keynes finally saw their service terminate, after a settling of a cable ownership dispute between BT Group and Virgin Media.

==== Satellite ====
On 1 November 2005 ITV turned off encryption on all of its satellite-based signals, following the lead from the BBC. These transmissions are on a limited spotbeam which is aimed primarily towards the United Kingdom, via the Astra 2D satellite located at 28.2 degrees east. This theoretically limits reception to Iceland, Ireland and the United Kingdom, allowing ITV to fulfil licensing agreements with content producers. However, many people report successful reception of these signals from across Europe by using larger dishes.

Sky+ HD is offered by BSkyB in both Ireland and the United Kingdom as an add-on to their existing Sky subscription service. The BBC is broadcasting BBC HD as a free-to-air channel from the Astra 2D satellite, and the channel can be viewed for free with suitable satellite reception equipment. There are additional equipment and subscription charges for HD from Sky TV but they are broadcasting over 30 channels in the HD format. Sky also offers a free-to-air version of its regular Sky service known as Freesat from Sky. Freesat from Sky provides a non-subscription card for public service broadcast channels Channel 4 and Channel 5, however Film4, Film4+1 are free-to-air.

On 12 July 2006, the BBC and ITV announced a free-to-air satellite service as a competitor to Freesat from Sky, to be called Freesat. The service was officially launched on 6 May 2008 and covers all BBC and ITV digital TV channels, plus interactive services, radio channels, and other channels. It is being touted as the satellite equivalent to Freeview, especially for areas unable to receive the Freeview DTT service.

Analogue satellite from the Astra 19.2°E satellite was discontinued on Thursday, 27 September 2001.

=== Vatican City ===
Digital transition completed in 2012.

== Overseas Arctics ==
=== Greenland ===
Greenland launched digital services in Nuuk in August 2002. The analog signal was switched off on 9 January 2012. The last settlement that upgraded to digital was Siorapaluk in 2012, with analogue switched off in October. Free-to-air digital terrestrial television using DVB-T is now covering all cities in Greenland, broadcasting TV and Radio stations from the Greenlandic and Danish broadcasting corporations.

Subscription based digital terrestrial television is currently available in the capital Nuuk, Qaqortoq, Ilulissat and Qasigiannguit through Nuuk TV. In addition to channels from Greenlandic Broadcasting Corporation, Nuuk TV, and Danish Broadcasting Corporation, the service offers additional channels from C More, and from American and European cable networks (typically subtitled in Danish).

== North America ==
=== Antigua and Barbuda ===
In Antigua, there is digital television in some territories: Cades Bay, Johnsons Point, Orange Valley, Crabs Hill, Urlings and Old Road. There is no date for completion.

=== Bahamas ===
The public broadcaster BCB transitioned to digital in September 2016. No completion date yet.

=== Barbados ===
In March 2025, CBC started the transition from an analogue system to a digital system, which may take up to December 2025.

=== Bermuda ===
The Bermuda Broadcasting Company terminated terrestrial NTSC-M broadcasts in March 2016. ZFB-TV (analogue channel 7) and ZBM-TV (analogue channel 9), the two television stations in Bermuda, switched to digital channels 20.1 and 20.2, respectively. Like its parent nation (the United Kingdom) and unlike the United States, Canada, and the Bahamas (which have been transitioning to ATSC), Bermuda switched over to DVB-T.

=== Canada ===
The Canadian Radio-television and Telecommunications Commission (CRTC) adopted the same digital television standard for stations in Canada as the United States and Mexico. The CRTC initially decided not to enforce a single date for transitioning to digital broadcasts, opting to let the economy decide when the switchover would occur. However, a later decision settled on 31 August 2011, limited to 30 markets. In addition, by 31 August 2011, all full-power transmitters on channels 52 and above had to either relocate to a lower channel or shut down. Canada's DTV transition was completed in 28 mandatory markets on Wednesday, 31 August 2011. Some CBC analogue transmitters in mandatory markets were permitted to operate for another year, and transmitters outside mandatory markets were given the option of converting to digital, or remaining in analogue. The CBC decided to shut down all (more than 600) of its remaining analogue transmitters on Tuesday, 31 July 2012, without replacing them. Also on 31 August 2011, all full-power TV transmitters had to vacate channels 52 to 69. There does however remain a very small number of community-based transmitters broadcasting in analogue.

CITY-TV was the first Canadian station to provide digital terrestrial service. As of 2007, other digital stations on air included the CBC and Radio-Canada stations in Toronto and Montreal, as well as CTV's CFTO and CIVT, and CKXT (SUN TV). This list is not exhaustive, and other station launches had been completed or were pending, although most were in the largest markets of Toronto, Vancouver, and Montreal. This also does not include digital or high-definition versions of specialty channels.

On 22 November 2003, the CBC made its first broadcast in HD, in the form of the Heritage Classic outdoor NHL game between the Edmonton Oilers and the Montreal Canadiens. Bell Satellite TV, a Canadian satellite company, and Rogers Cable and Vidéotron provide more than 21 HDTV channels to their subscribers, including TSN HD, Rogers Sportsnet HD, Discovery HD (Canadian Edition), The Movie Network HD, and several U.S. stations, plus some PBS feeds and a few pay-TV movie channels. CTV Toronto broadcast in HD along with its western counterpart, BC CTV; CTV was also the first to broadcast a terrestrial HD digital ATSC signal in Canada. Global joined in late 2004. Other networks are continuing to announce availability of HD signals. CHUM Limited's Citytv in Toronto was the first HDTV broadcaster in Canada; however, most cable and satellite subscribers across Canada can now access multiple channels in HDTV, with major American and Canadian affiliate stations broadcasting HDTV signals with no CanCon overlay for advertising. Typically these channels are NBC HD, ABC HD, CBS HD, Fox HD, TSN HD, Sportsnet HD, CBC HD, and others, as of summer 2006. CBC HD officially launched its HDTV programming on 5 March 2005. CBC HD broadcasts the first game of its Hockey Night in Canada Saturday double header in HDTV. The 2006 Stanley Cup playoffs saw an increased amount of HDTV coverage as well.

=== Cayman Islands ===
Broadcaster Cayman 27 announced that it started broadcasting digitally on ATSC in 2012. No completion date yet.

=== Curaçao ===
Started DTT broadcasts based on DVB-T in 2009. No date yet when to switch off the older NTSC analogue broadcasts.

=== Grenada ===
Digital switchover still being planned as of 2014.

=== Jamaica ===
Began in 2022, and it will be completed by 2023. Jamaica converts to ATSC 3.0. Television Jamaica launched ATSC 3.0 broadcasts on 31 January 2022, at 6:30 PM local time.

=== Saint Lucia ===
No DTT has currently been planned in Saint Lucia. Analogue cable transmissions were shut during 2013.

=== Sint Maarten ===
DVB-T adopted since 2011, and introduced by 2013. No completion date yet.

=== Trinidad and Tobago ===
ATSC 3.0 has been adopted as of January 2023. Digital switch-on was supposed to occur in late 2025 but is delayed.

=== Turks and Caicos Islands ===
People's Television Network (PTV) launched a digital service in 2010. It uses the UHF band. No completion date yet.

=== United States ===
External videos
- The DTV "nightlight" video that was produced by the National Association of Broadcasters for broadcast by its participating members.

The United States adopted ATSC standards for digital terrestrial broadcasts. These standards include standard definition, enhanced definition, and high definition formats. On 8 May 2008, Federal Communications Commission Chairman Kevin J. Martin announced that the agency would test the transition to digital television in Wilmington, North Carolina, beginning 8 September 2008. This was in order to work out any kinks that might not be foreseen before most of the country's broadcasters stopped transmitting traditional analog signals and upgraded to digital-only programming. Full-power terrestrial broadcasts using the analog NTSC standard were required by law to cease by 12 June 2009. A deadline for transition to digital broadcasting was set as 17 February 2009, but was extended and performed instead on 12 June 2009. Exceptions to the 12 June deadline included low-power stations, and "nightlight" stations which broadcast PSAs on the transition until 12 July 2009. Some television sets will continue to use analog NTSC tuners if connected to an analog cable system or a converter box (which may receive digital signals over the air, from a cable system, or from a satellite system). Low-power stations continue to broadcast in analog, but these stations must transition to digital by 1 September 2015, or go silent. Class A low-power stations were then required to transition to digital by 1 September 2015. The low-power and translator station deadline was suspended on 24 April 2015, due to concerns that the then-upcoming 600 MHz spectrum auction could "potentially displace a significant number of LPTV and TV translator stations", and would "require" analogue stations to incur the costs of transitioning to digital before completion of the auction and repacking process". After the auction's completion in 2017, the FCC announced 13 July 2021 as the new analogue low-power shutoff date. On 21 June 2021, the FCC granted the State of Alaska an extension due to novel factors that prevented the completion of stations digital facilities, setting a new low-power analogue shutoff date of 10 January 2022. Some Canadian or Mexican border signals may remain available in analog form to some US viewers after the shutdown of US-based full-power NTSC broadcasts.

  - Puerto Rico: Complied with the FCC transition to ATSC digital on 12 June 2009 on all full-power stations.
  - U.S. Virgin Islands: Complied with the FCC transition to ATSC digital on 12 June 2009 on all full-power stations.

== Latin America ==
=== Mexico ===
Mexican television broadcaster Televisa made experimental HDTV broadcasts in the early 1990s, in collaboration with Japan's NHK, but the country moved to implement the ATSC standard like the rest of the North American continent. Digital broadcasts started in 2000, with the first being Tijuana's XETV. Today, the vast majority of events and programs are broadcast in high definition. Currently, almost all cable providers, as well as Sky, the major DTH provider, offer HD channels.

By the third quarter of 2005, HDTV transmissions from TV Azteca were available in Mexico's largest markets: Mexico City, Guadalajara, and Monterrey. Phase Two of TV Azteca's national roll-out brought HDTV services to six cities along the Mexico–U.S. border (Matamoros, Reynosa, Nuevo Laredo, Ciudad Juárez, Mexicali, and Tijuana) by the first half of 2006. This roll-out took advantage of HDTV receivers already in place thanks to an earlier HDTV roll-out by stations on the American side of the border. TV Azteca has also broadcast the Mexican football tournament in HDTV.

XETV in Tijuana, Baja California, is on the air in HDTV using the 720p format. This affiliate of the American CW Network is on UHF channel 23, broadcasting from Mt. San Antonio in Tijuana with 403,000 watts, directed primarily northward at San Diego. In January 2006, Televisa's XEFB-TV and Multimedios' XHAW-TV in Monterrey began HDTV transmissions on UHF channels 48 and 50, respectively. In February 2006, Televisa's XHUAA in Tijuana began its HDTV transmissions on channel 20. They have no HDTV programs. Channel 20 broadcasts an upconverted version of the programs of XHUAA's analog signal on channel 57.

Analogue shutdown was originally scheduled to occur in 2012, but on Thursday, 2 September 2010, the Mexican government advanced the analogue shutdown from 2012 to 2015. From 2013, areas began to be switched over regionally depending on the presence of digital terrestrial stations and a campaign headed by the SCT to distribute free television converters to households on the government welfare rolls. The first digital switchover was to begin on Tuesday, 28 May 2013 in Tijuana, but was postponed to 18 July due to the 2013 Baja California state elections. The switchover was completed nationwide on 31 December 2015, when all remaining analogue television stations left the air. Mexico then instituted a nationwide remapping of network stations in late 2015 requiring most of them to map to the channel number in either Mexico City, or for regional networks, the main metro area served by the network's flagship station.

==== Official plan for Mexican DTT ====
Currently there are 38 digital channels in Mexico. They are:

- 11 in Mexico City
- 6 in Monterrey
- 5 in Guadalajara
- 5 in Tijuana
- 5 in Juárez
- 3 in Mexicali
- 2 in Reynosa
- 2 in Matamoros
- 3 in Nuevo Laredo

The analog signal was gradually switched off in 2015 and no longer exists.

=== Belize ===
Not yet introduced DTT. Head of broadcasting division Ilham Ghazi and telecom director Justin Barrow said in September 2018 that a switchover has not been planned as extra spectrum space was not demanded.

=== Costa Rica ===
Costa Rica chose the Japanese–Brazilian standard ISDB-T as the seventh country to do so, on 25 May 2010, and started trial transmissions from Irazú Volcano on Channel 13 on 19 March 2012. The country was scheduled to shut down analogue signals permanently in December 2018, but this was changed to 15 August 2019. The transition is complete.

=== Cuba ===
Began to propose DVB-T in May 2009. However, Cuba opted for the Chinese DTMB standard and began tests in 2013, with new digital transmitters being rolled out and a shutoff date in 2021.

=== Dominican Republic ===
The Dominican Government once set a final analogue shut down date of all analogue transmissions on 24 September 2015. However, INDOTEL, a telecommunications department of the Dominican Government, postponed it to 9 August 2021. The transition was further delayed until 30 November 2024.

=== El Salvador ===
In 2017, the government of El Salvador adopted the Japanese ISDB-T platform. The transition began on 21 December 2018, and it will be completed on 1 December 2024.

=== Guatemala ===
Guatemala approved the use of digital broadcasting with the ISDB-Tb system. Guatemala started testing ISDB-T broadcasts in December 2017, with the aim of rolling out the services soon and an analogue switch off date of 2022.

=== Haiti ===
DTT made its experimental launch in December 2016, using the ATSC standard.

=== Honduras ===
Honduras was the first country in Central America to adopt a digital TV standard, choosing ATSC in 2007. Currently, three digital channels are broadcasting: "TEN Canal 10" was the first digital TV station in Honduras. It began broadcasting in 2007 in SDTV. CampusTv is the first high-definition TV station in Central America; CampusTv was founded by the University of San Pedro Sula. The third channel is "La UTV", founded by the National Autonomous University of Honduras. The first phase of the analogue shutdown began on 31 December 2016, and the second phase was completed on 31 December 2019. The whole country is now entirely covered by DTV.

=== Nicaragua ===
The country chose the ISDB-T standard in 2015. The first DTT trials began in March 2018.

=== Panama ===
Panama approved the adoption of the European standard DVB-T, to be used for the first time at the 2010 World Cup. Analogue TV sets were no longer allowed to be sold since 11 June 2018, unless provided with a free DVB-T converter box. Since 11 December 2018, no analogue TV sets may be sold, even if provided with a free converter box; this deadline was later extended until April 2019. The switchover date was on 1 October 2020 for the provinces of Panamá, Colón, and Panamá Oeste. All other provinces have no switchover date. The switchover date was delayed, being originally planned for 2017. Due to COVID-19 pandemic remote learning measures, the switchover date was delayed again, this time until 1 June 2021. In July 2021, the switchover was delayed indefinitely until at least 90% of users have digital TV access, as 41% have access. Three shutdown drills were carried out. On 16 January 2023 at 7:18 PM, analogue TV signals were switched off in the provinces of Panama, Panama Oeste, and Colón, in a ceremony that was broadcast.

=== Argentina ===
After a bumpy series of reversals, Argentina officially selected the Japanese–Brazilian standard ISDB-T International on 28 August 2009, and agreed with Japan to cooperate on resource exchange and technical transfer.

While HDTV-ready TV sales were increasing in Argentina, no single HD feed was available by terrestrial television as of mid-2009, as the standard selection process was not made official until 28 August 2009. As of that date, only a few HD feeds were available by cable, which were unregulated and used ATSC set-top boxes installed at the customers' premises. Subscription TV provider Antina uses the DVB standard to deliver an alternative service to cable TV, using standard-definition analog outputs.

Digital television broadcasts started on Tuesday, 9 September 2008, in Buenos Aires. It is expected that the public TV stations will begin the transition to ISDB-T once the standard for over-the-air transmissions has been set, and on-air service started on 28 April 2010.

As of September 2011, a few programs were available in 1080i@50 Hz and broadcast by air. That includes most local football matches and a TV show hosted by Sergio Goycochea (former goalkeeper of Argentina's national football team), all of them on "TV Pública HD"; and also soap operas such as "El Hombre de Tu Vida", "Cuando Me Sonreís", and "Supertorpe", on Telefe HD.

The analogue network was to be terminated on 1 January 2019, postponed until 2021, delayed until 2024, and delayed until 2026.

=== Bolivia ===
Bolivia chose the Japanese–Brazilian standard ISDB-T International on 5 July 2010. Digital broadcasts of Bolivia TV began in May 2010. The current analogue broadcast shutdown is planned to take place in three stages, beginning with the La Paz, Cochabamba, Santa Cruz areas on 29 August 2026, followed by Cobija, Montero, Oruro, Potosí, Sucre, Tarija, Trinidad, and other towns with a population above 40,000 in May 2028. The remaining areas are scheduled to be shut down in May 2030. The adoption of the ISDB-Tb standard on 5 July 2010 is also documented by the Japanese ministry.

=== Brazil ===
Analogue closedown warning broadcast in Brazil

The SBTVD standard (based on the Japanese standard ISDB-T) was adopted on 29 June 2006 and launched on 2 November 2007. Free-to-air HD digital transmissions began, after a period of test broadcasts, on Sunday, 2 December 2007 in São Paulo. In 2007, only the greater São Paulo metropolitan area could receive the signal. Belo Horizonte and Rio de Janeiro began to receive free-to-air digital signals on 7 and 8 April 2008, respectively. On 4 August 2008 and 22 October 2008, Goiânia and Curitiba began to receive DTV signals, respectively. Digital broadcast started in Salvador on 2 December and in Campinas on 3 December 2008, and was also expanded in 2008 to Brasília. Digital broadcasts were phased into the other 23 state capitals in the following years, and to the remaining cities by 31 December 2013. The government estimated seven years for complete signal expansion over all of the territory. Analog television was scheduled to be shut down on 25 October 2017.

The interactive platform called Ginga consists entirely of free software and received high publicity for being considered the main appeal for the change. The government promised WiMAX as a return channel for the system, set to be implemented in the following years.

All five major TV networks (Band, Record, RedeTV!, SBT, and TV Globo) broadcast in HDTV signal (1080i), SDTV 480i, and 1seg as well.

The analogue switch-off started on 1 March 2016 in Rio Verde, Goiás as a pilot experiment, followed by the Federal District and main cities and metropolitan regions from 17 November 2016 to 2020. The transition was completed in most of the country on 9 January 2019; analogue signals in the country's remaining rural areas were initially expected to switch off in 2023; however, the Brazilian Ministry of Communications announced a delay in the switch-off up until June 2025, when most of them were closed. Satellite analog switch-off completed on 30 June 2025. However, because of the 2024 Rio Grande do Sul floods, some free-to-air signals were maintained in that region of the country and were expected to switch off later in the year. The last signals were switched off on 31 December 2025.

=== Chile ===
TVN made HDTV tests in 1999; Canal 13 is now broadcasting, in Santiago only, a test transmission in the three HDTV formats (ATSC, DVB, and ISDB). In Valparaíso, UCV made ATSC broadcast tests for the Valparaíso area, and Canal 13 also made tests in DVB format in April 2007 for the Valparaíso area. After rescheduling the date for a final decision on DTV formats several times, the government stopped offering dates for such an announcement. On 14 September 2009, President Michelle Bachelet announced that the government had finally decided, after prolonged delays, on a digital television standard. Chile adopted the ISDB-T Japanese standard (with the custom modifications made by Brazil). Simulcasting was expected to begin in 2010, with a projected analog switch-off in 2017.

On 10 September 2010, TVN, Canal 13, Chilevisión, La Red, UCV, El Mostrador TV, and NGB were transmitting digital signals in Santiago. TVN and Chilevisión tested 3D TV on free ISDB-T channels 30 and 33.

Currently there are 13 digital channels in Santiago:

- 24.1 Canal 13 HD
- 24.2 Canal 13 C
- 26.1 El Mostrador HD
- 26.2 El Mostrador SD
- 27.1 Mega HD
- 28.1 La Red Digital
- 30.1 Chilevisión HD 1
- 30.2 Chilevisión HD 2
- 33.1 TVN HD 1
- 33.2 TVN SD
- 36.1 Chilevisión 2 (encrypted)
- 36.2 Canal de Noticias (encrypted)
- 36.3 Canal Internacional (encrypted)

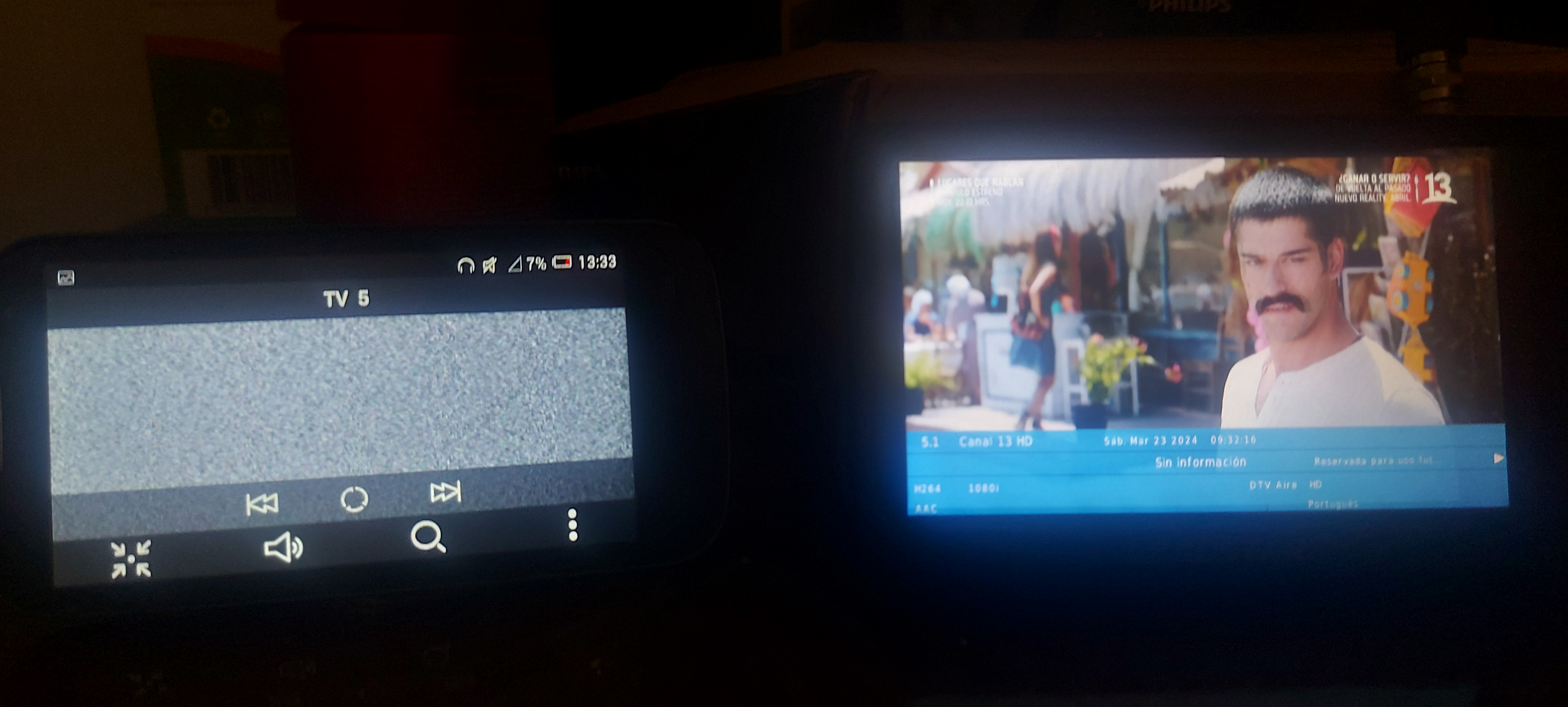
Photo comparing transmissions of channel 5 in Ovalle, repeater of the Canal 13 network, on 23 March 2024. The digital transition occurred that week on the Coquimbo region (where Ovalle is located).

The transition to digital started in 2012. ASO was initially delayed to 15 April 2024, but was later pushed back to various dates depending on the region. The transition started on 13 March 2024 in the Arica y Parinacota, Tarapacá, Aysén and Magallanes regions, finishing on 19 March 2024. The Atacama, Los Rios, Coquimbo and Los Lagos regions started the transition on 20 March 2024, and finished during midnight on 26 March 2024. It continued on 27 March 2024 in the Ñuble, O'Higgins, Maule and Antofagasta, concluding on 2 April 2024. The last phase of the analogue shutdown started on 3 April 2024 in the Araucanía, Biobío, Valparaíso and Metropolitan regions, and concluding on 9 April 2024, ending analogue broadcasts in the entire country. Before that, some independent regional stations shut down their analogue broadcasts prior to the official deadline.

  - Easter Island: Tenders started in July 2019. Analogue shutdown started on 3 April 2024, and ended on 9 April 2024, due to it being in the Valparaíso region.

=== Colombia ===
On 28 August 2008, Colombia adopted the European digital terrestrial television standard, DVB-T, but on 9 January 2012 changed this to DVB-T2. All transmissions now use DVB-T2 (6 MHz).

Señal Colombia—Colombia's state-owned channel—has made digital terrestrial television broadcast tests since 2006, in northwest Bogotá and downtown Cartagena, transmitting in the three DTV formats: ATSC, DVB-T, and ISDB-T. The Chinese standard DMB-T/H was also considered but could not be tested.

HDTV-ready television sets (DVB-T) have been available in Colombia since 2003, but cable companies have not broadcast HD content to their subscribers. Satellite television provider DirecTV Colombia offers HD channels.

Preparations were made to launch DVB-T services in (tentatively) May 2009, when the first DTV transmitter was to go live (probably at Manjui Hill in Facatativá). The launch was to initially allow 11 million households in the regions of Bogotá D.C., Boyacá, Cundinamarca, north of Huila, Tolima, western Meta, and probably Caldas and Risaralda to watch DTV services.

The Spanish association Impulsa TDT, dedicated to the implementation of digital terrestrial television, and the Colombian government signed an official agreement under which Spain would help the country implement DVB-T.

Digital television broadcasts started on Monday, 20 September 2010. On 28 December 2010, Caracol TV and RCN TV officially started digital broadcasts for Bogotá, Medellín, and surrounding areas on channels 14 and 15 UHF, respectively. Señal Colombia and Canal Institucional had started test digital broadcasts earlier in 2010. The government declared the process officially began on 31 December 2022. No date for the completion of the process has been given yet.

=== Ecuador ===
Ecuador chose the Japanese–Brazilian standard ISDB-T as the sixth country to do so, on 26 March 2010. The analogue switch off was delayed several times. In September 2018, the telecom ministry said that the first phase would start in May 2020 starting in Quito where it finished and it continues until December 2023.

=== Falkland Islands ===
Digital TV now exclusively broadcast through KTV and British Forces Broadcasting Service since the early 2010s.

=== Guyana ===
Made a roadmap to a transition between 2014 and 2017. The DTT network has rolled out and by 2025, it is 80% complete.

=== Paraguay ===
Paraguay chose the Japanese–Brazilian standard ISDB-T on 1 June 2010. The transmission of digital television broadcasts started in August 2011, by TV Pública (which belongs to the Paraguayan government) with an initial coverage area of 25 kilometres (about 16 miles) from Asunción downtown. The analogue television system switch-off was taking place in 2020, however, on 22 January 2019 La Nación reported the country pushed it back to 2021. Later, the shutdown occurred in Asunción, the Central, Presidente Hayes, and parts of the Cordillera and Paraguarí departments on 31 December 2024.

=== Peru ===
Peru chose the Brazilian modified version of the Japanese standard ISDB-T on 23 April 2009. It agreed with Japan to cooperate on resource exchange and technical transfer on 21 August 2009, and on-air service started on Channel 7 of TV Perú on 30 March 2010. 1seg is one of its attractive features.

Peru achieved its first HD live demonstration and test program transmission using an OB Van, aiming for nationwide deployment with Japanese cooperation in Trujillo for three days from 28 January 2011.

Digital television broadcasts started in Lima and Callao (Territory 1) in March 2010, and analogue broadcasts were terminated on 31 December 2024; Arequipa, Cusco, Trujillo, Piura and Huancayo (territory 2) started digital transition somewhere between April and June 2018 and analogue broadcasts were terminated on 31 December 2024 or 1 January 2025.

=== Suriname ===
Adopted the ATSC standard for DTT and completed the analogue switch off in 2015.

=== Uruguay ===
On 27 August 2007, the Uruguayan government issued a decree stating that the DVB-T and DVB-H standards would be adopted. While HDTV-ready TV sets are available in the country, a few factors seemed to constrain the development of the new technology in the near term:

- Prices for LCD, plasma, and DLP-based TV sets can be twice as expensive in Uruguay as in the region, or four times more expensive than in the US, while wages are also lower than in the region. Some DLP-based displays cost up to US$7,000 in Uruguay as of 2006. There have been few examples, if any, of CRT-based HDTV sets.
- The cable industry has few incentives to provide other services beyond basic TV services: internet-by-cable and cable telephony have been either strictly prohibited by law (Antel, the local telco company owned by the government and with a strong union, enjoys a monopoly on basic telephony services and landlines) or thwarted by high taxes on equipment that make a business case for newer technologies unfeasible. Digital cable has started rolling out, with an initial 100% increase of monthly cost for the SD digital service. High prices for HDTV sets do not help. Some of the cable companies for the largest markets are also owned by the largest local TV content providers, which as of 2006 had not started broadcasting any HDTV content since the government had not approved which standard was to be used.
- DirecTV might be in a better position to provide HDTV content, given that it has experience and content from the US and serves the whole continent. But DirecTV's policy in Uruguay has been that of providing "leftover" equipment from Argentina to its customers in Uruguay (i.e., first-generation RCA receivers), which do not yet support HDTV content or Dolby AC-3 sound.
- Uruguay hoped for neighbouring countries to reach an agreement on an HDTV standard, but so far that does not seem to be the case. Brazil has adopted the ISDB system, while Argentina and Uruguay have historically used TV systems based on a European standard (PAL-N 625/50 Hz). Argentina seemed to be settling on the ATSC standard before 2009, and Uruguayan URSEC authorities have provided no information on which road they will go. On 27 August 2007, URSEC settled on DVB-T and DVB-H. The TV sets being sold in Uruguay seem to be closer to ATSC HDTV-based standards (60 Hz systems, with ATSC tuners in some cases). Most of the DVD-based content in the country is NTSC/60 Hz-based, while the TV standard in use is PAL/50 Hz-based. Most of the analogue TV sets sold are PAL-N, PAL-M, and NTSC capable, while most DVD players are multi-region. Authorities are not asking retailers to identify which standard the HDTV sets sold adhere to.

The Uruguayan government decided to adopt ISDB-T for geopolitical reasons and to maintain consistent relations with Argentina and Brazil on 27 December 2010. Uruguayans will start receiving digital television signals by the end of 2012, and the scheduled analog signal blackout will be in 2014–2015. The country began broadcasting digital television on 27 December 2010. Analogue television switched off on 25 September 2026 at 23:59, following delays from 21 November 2015; analogue television will switch off in Bella Unión on 31 July 2029.

=== Venezuela ===
On 6 October 2009, Venezuela officially adopted ISDB-T with Brazilian modifications. Transition from analog to digital is expected to take place over the next 10 years. The seven stages of set-top box manufacturing, testing, and implementation schedule are proceeding well and will start to deploy DTT from 2011. Digital television transmission began in 2007 for the broadcasting of the 2007 Copa América. Later, on 20 February 2013, transmissions began nationwide. Analogue was set to be terminated in 2020.

== No transition information available ==
- Anguilla
- Antarctica
- Aruba
- Ascension Island
- Ashmore and Cartier Islands
- British Virgin Islands
- Montserrat
- Pitcairn Islands
- Sahrawi Arab Democratic Republic
- Saint Kitts and Nevis
- Somalia
- South Georgia and the South Sandwich Islands
- Tokelau
- Tristan da Cunha
- Yemen

== See also ==
- Autoroll
- Digital dividend after digital television transition
- Digital television
- High-definition television transition
