= Quiero Televisión =

Spanish pay digital TV service

Quiero Televisión SA
- Industry: Digital Terrestrial Television services
- Founded: 2000; 26 years ago
- Defunct: April 2002
- Fate: Bankruptcy
- Headquarters: Spain

Quiero Televisión SA, commonly known as Quiero TV (Spanish for "I-Want TV"), was a pay television service over digital terrestrial television (TDT) in Spain in the early years of the digital television transition. It launched in 2000,

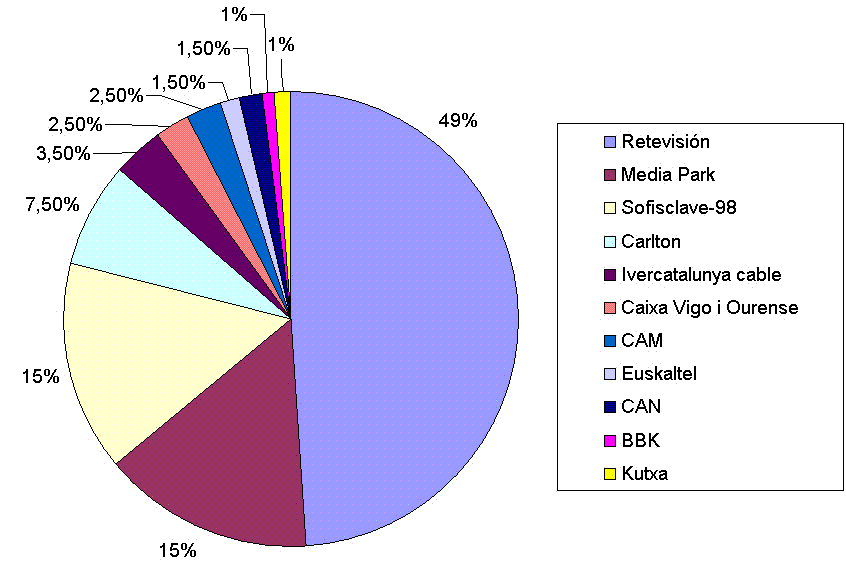
Ownership stakes in Quiero TV

Quiero TV received its digital television license in 1999, and operated from 2000 to 2002, with 14 channels, at a time when the only other digital terrestrial channels were TVE 1 and La 2, the two main channels of Spain's public broadcaster. Quiero TV was 49% owned by Auna/Retevisión; other investors included Planeta of Spain, Carlton Communications of the UK, and the MediaPark investment firm of Catalonia.

Having to compete aggressively with satellite and cable for the pay TV market, Quiero TV provided set-top boxes and antenna servicing to subscribers. Expenses ended up being far higher than planned. By early 2001, Quiero had 200,000 subscribers, but afterwards, customer counts decreased. Losing €24 million a month, and failing to find anyone to buy the company, it shut down in April 2002, having lost around 600 million euros total. Another Carlton pay television service, ITV Digital in the United Kingdom, also shut down a month later.
