= Regional Radiocommunication Conference =

A Regional Radiocommunication Conference (RRC) is a meeting held between members of the International Telecommunication Union from one or more ITU Regions, but from the whole world. Such a meeting is normally used to put in place an agreement on use of frequencies for services such as broadcasting.

== Examples ==
=== RRC ST61 ===
An important conference was held in Stockholm from 26 May to 22 June 1961, 38 countries were part of that meeting.

- Final acts of the conference

=== RRC GE75 ===
- Final acts of the conference

=== RRC GE89 ===
- Final acts of the conference

=== RRC-04/06 ===
The snappily-named "RRC-04/06" was a Regional Radiocommunication Conference held in two sessions between 2004 and 2006. It put in place a new agreement and frequency plan for digital broadcasting (DVB-T and T-DAB) in Bands III, and IV & V for the whole of Region 1 and Iran from Region 3.

The first session of the Conference took place from 10 May to 31 May 2004 in Geneva, Switzerland; the second session took place from 15 May to 16 June 2006, also in Geneva.

It is intended that the resulting Plan and Agreement will replace those drawn up in Stockholm in 1961, and Geneva in 1989. The achieved agreement is known as GE-06

- Summary of the first session
- Summary of the second session
- RRC-06 Allocations Database (58 MB)
- RRC-06 Allocations Display Software (211 MB)
- Final acts of the Conference

== See also ==
- Geneva plan 1975
