= Yvette King =

Korean-Australian entertainment journalist

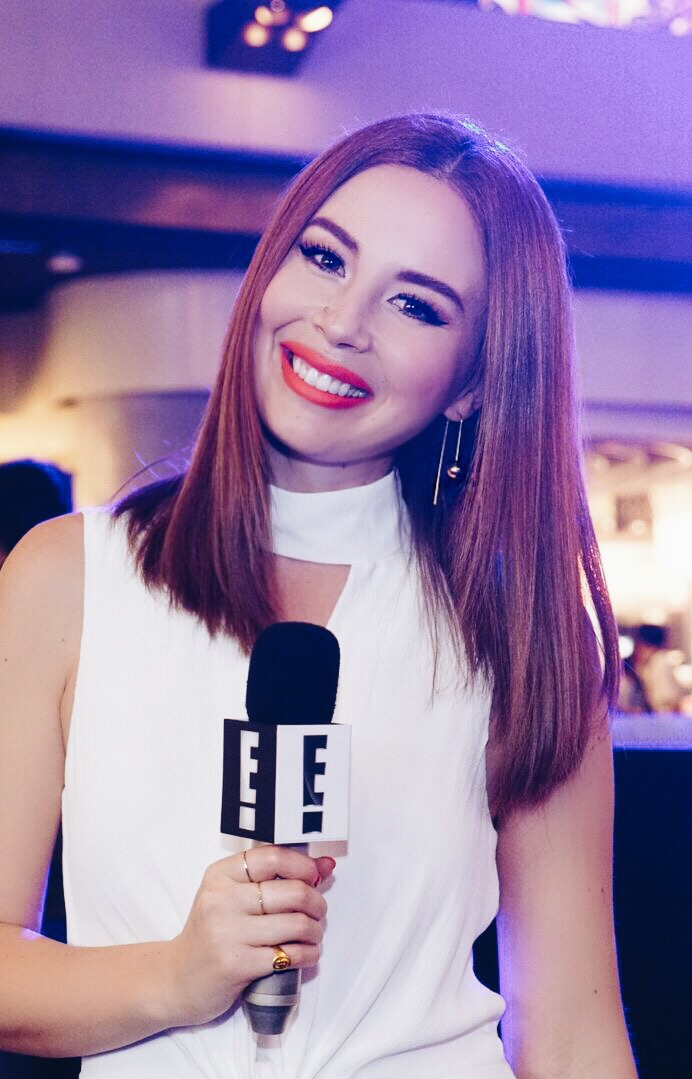
- King in 2016 at Marina Bay Sands, Singapore
- Born: 23 October 1983 (age 41); Sydney, New South Wales, Australia
- Occupation: Television host

Yvette King (born 23 October 1983) is a Korean-Australian entertainment journalist who is best known as host of E! News Asia and anchor of Fox Sports News (Asia).

== Early life ==
After graduating from The University of Sydney with a degree in journalism, King got her first reporter role as a video journalist for The Daily Telegraph.

== Career ==
=== Television ===
In 2013, King joined Fox International Channels, hosting Football Crazy and anchoring Fox Sports Central Asia and Fox Sports News.

In 2015, King joined E! News Asia.

Interviewees include David Beckham, Victoria Beckham, Eva Longoria, Chris Hemsworth, Charlize Theron, Jessica Chastain, Patricia Field, Kevin Hart and Naomi Campbell.
