= 2019 The Nationals =

Esports league season

2019 The Nationals season
- League: The Nationals
- Sport: Electronic sports
- Teams: 6
- TV partner(s): eGG Network; 5 Plus

Seasons
- ← Road to The Nationals 2020 →

The 2019 The Nationals was the inaugural season of The Nationals, an electronic sports (Esports) league in the Philippines. The season featured three titles, Dota 2, Mobile Legends: Bang Bang, and Tekken 7 with two conferences each.

== Teams ==
Team	Company
Bren EPro	BrenPro Inc.
Cignal Ultra Warriors	Cignal TV Inc.
Happy Feet Emperors	HappyFeet Esports
Omega	PLDT Inc. / Smart Communications
STI eOlympians	STI Education Systems Holdings, Inc.
Suha-XCTN Punishers	–

== The Road to The Nationals ==
The Nationals was officially launched on July 24, 2018, in a press conference. In the same event, the "Road to The Nationals" a series of qualification tournament to determine the players of the six franchise teams to compete in The Nationals' inaugural season was announced. Three qualifiers for each of The Nationals three video game titles were held. These tournaments ran from August to October 2018 with the qualifying eight teams from each of the three titles competing in the final qualification tournament at the Electronic Sports and Gaming Summit 2018 held on October 27 to 28 at the SMX Convention Center in Pasay.

The winning teams and individuals (for competitors in single-player titles) were given millions of pesos in prize money and a chance to get drafted in one of the six franchise teams of The Nationals.

=== Players ===
The players of the inaugural 2019 The Nationals season were drafted among the winners of the Road to The Nationals qualification tournaments held in the latter half of 2018. The Nationals mean to make electronic sports a professional career with players to be given monthly salaries ranging from ₱40,000 to ₱50,000 among other benefits such as team housing, physicians, healthcare, etc. Minors are eligible to compete if they have waivers from their parents consenting their participation.

=== Sponsorship ===
The first financial firm to become a sponsor of the league's qualification tournament, The Road to The Nationals, was the Rizal Commercial Banking Corporation (RCBC) which announced its sponsorship deal with the league in October 2018 to specifically promote its MyWallet Virtual Card service.

== Conferences ==
=== Dota 2 ===
==== First Conference ====
After playing a total of 40 games in the group phase, the Cignal Ultra Warriors secured a bye to the best-of-five grand finals while PLDT-Smart Omega and Suha-XCTN Punishers played against each other in the best-of-three playoffs. Suha Execretion eliminated Omega in the playoffs to advance to the grand final where they were defeated by Cignal. Cignal clinched the first conference Dota 2 title with a 3–2 win in the grand final.

The Best Player of the final series is Fernando Mendoza (Nando) of Cignal who averaged 9.4 kills, 6 assists, and 650 GPM per game.

Group stage standing

Team	W	L	Qualification
Cignal Ultra Warriors	13	3	Grand Finals
Omega	11	5	Playoffs
Suha-XCTN Punishers	8	8	Playoffs
Happy Feet Emperors	5	11	
Bren EPro	3	13	

Final round

Playoffs
Omega	L
Suha-XCTN Punishers	W

Grand Finals
Cignal Ultra Warriors	3
Suha-XCTN Punishers	2

==== Second Conference ====
The second conference began on May 1, 2019.

=== Mobile Legends: Bang Bang ===
==== First Conference ====
The Mobile Legends First Conference marked the league debut of the STI eOlympians in The Nationals. After playing 31 games in the group stage (including tiebreaker), PLDT-Smart Omega became the top seed with the Cignal Ultra Warriors becoming second. PLDT-Smart Omega became the first ever The Nationals MLBB Champion after sweeping Cignal Ultra Warriors in the best-of-five finals series, 3 games to none.

Group stages (Standings)

Team	W	L	Qualification
PLDT-Smart Omega	16	6	Playoffs
SUHA Execration Punishers	16	6	Playoffs
Cignal Ultra Warriors	14	8	Playoffs
Bren EPro	12	12	Playoffs
STI eOlympians	7	15	
Happy Feet Emperors	3	19	

Final round

Semifinals (Best-of-3)
(#2) SUHA-XCTN Punishers	0
(#3) Cignal Ultra Warriors	2
(#1) PLDT-Smart Omega	2
(#4) Bren EPro	0

Grand Finals (Best-of-5)
(#3) Cignal Ultra Warriors	0
(#1) PLDT-Smart Omega	3
Battle-for-Third (Best-of-3)
(#2) SUHA-XCTN Punishers	0
(#4) Bren EPro	2

==== Second Conference ====
A second conference was held for Mobile Legends: Bang Bang.

=== Tekken 7 ===
Two conferences was held for Tekken 7.
