= Road to The Nationals =

- League: The Nationals
- Sport: Electronic sports
- Duration: Eliminations; August – October 2018; Grand final October 26 – 27, 2018
- Teams: Grand final (ESGS 2018); 8 (Dota 2) and eight solo players for Tekken 7
- TV partner: ESPN 5
- Finals champions: Dota 2 Sterling Global Dragons; Tekken 7 Andreij Albar (PBE|Doujin)
- Runners-up: Dota 2 Station 751; Tekken 7 Alexandre Lavarez (PBE|AK)

Seasons
- 2019 →

The Road to The Nationals is a series of tournaments which serves as the prelude to the inaugural 2019 season of the eSports league in the Philippines known as "The Nationals". The winners will be part of a pool of players which the six pioneering teams of the league will draw players from.

== Background ==
=== Launch and format ===
The Nationals eSports league was officially launched on July 24, 2018, in a press conference. In the same event, the "Road to The Nationals" a series of qualification tournament to determine the players of the six franchise teams to compete in The Nationals' inaugural season was announced. Three qualifiers for each of The Nationals three video game titles will be held. These tournaments will run from August to October 2018 with the qualifying eight teams from each of the three titles competing in the final qualification tournament at the Electronic Sports and Gaming Summit 2018 to be held from October 27 to 28 at the SMX Convention Center in Pasay.

The winning teams will be given millions of pesos in prize money and a chance to get drafted in one of the six franchise teams of The Nationals.

=== Video game titles ===
Three titles, belonging to three categories: PC gaming, mobile gaming, console gaming, are contested in The Nationals. On July 24, 2018, two titles for The Nationals were confirmed: Dota 2 for PC Gaming and Mobile Legends: Bang Bang for Mobile gaming. As of that date, two titles were being considered for the console gaming category: NBA 2K19 and Tekken 7. NBA 2K19 was confirmed as the third title by August 2018. but this decision was retracted and Tekken 7 was made the third title in September 2018. The Road to The Nationals featured these three titles.

Road to The Nationals Video Game Titles:
Title	Category
Dota 2	PC Gaming
Mobile Legends: Bang Bang	Mobile Gaming
~~NBA 2K19~~; Tekken 7	Console Gaming

== Qualification tournaments ==
=== Dota 2 ===
Elimination tournaments for Dota 2 were held from August 4 to October 13, 2018.

Date	Host		Qualified teams
Date	Venue	Locality	Qualified teams
August 4, 2018	TNC Morayta	Manila	Quid Pro Quo; ~~Sterling Global Dragons~~ (Note: The Sterling Global Dragons originally qualified through the tournament held in Manila. However due to a roster change they had to forfeit their qualification spot to So Lucky and qualified again for the final competition through the Cavite qualifier.); So Lucky
August 11, 2018	Mineski Portal Cebu	Cebu City	~~Polar Ace~~ (Note: The TaskUs Titans originally qualified for the Road to The Nationals Finals through the Cebu qualifier as Polar Ace back when the team has yet to enter in a sponsorship deal with TaskUs. The team change its roster but had to qualify again due to rules prohibiting a team to add or change members of its roster in the middle of the series. They were replaced by Station 751.); Station 751
August 25, 2018	iPlay CyberSquare	Cagayan de Oro	Davao's Pride
September 22, 2018	TNC Bacolod	Bacolod	Voyager
September 29, 2018	Localhost Café	Iloilo City	TaskUs Titans
October 13, 2018	UGZ	Imus, Cavite	Sterling Global Dragons

=== Mobile Legends: Bang Bang ===
The Road to The Nationals integrated the Mobile Legends: Bang Bang Professional League Season 2 tournament for the elimination phase of Mobile Legends: Bang Bang.

=== Tekken 7 ===
Elimination tournaments for Tekken 7 were scheduled be held from August 4 to October 13, 2018. Originally the schedule was meant for elimination tournaments for NBA 2K19 before the basketball video game title was replaced by the arcade fighting game.

Date	Host		Qualified players
Date	Venue	Locality	Qualified players
September 22, 2018	First 5 Lounge	Cebu City	Francis Cabahug (UFTC|Gogoy)
September 29, 2018	Game Patch	Davao City	Jade Jaynine (ArkAngel.Jaynine)
September 30, 2018	Captain Poi's Gamehouse	Cagayan de Oro	Raymund Sarte (LimitBreak)
October 6, 2018	PlayBook Makati	Makati	AK); Andreij Albar (PBE|Doujin)
October 13, 2018	Secret Base Gaming Lounge and Boardgame Cafe	Marikina	Juliano Lozano (Elite.Jules)
October 14, 2018	PlayBook Makati	Makati	Ryan Cocharo (SMAP|Tomahawk); Jeffrey Gonzales (Coffee_Prinz!)

== Final tournament ==
The final tournament will be held in conjunction with the Electronic Sports and Gaming Summit 2018 from October 27 to 28 at the SMX Convention Center in Pasay. Matches will be broadcast live on AksyonTV.

=== Dota 2 ===
Eight teams qualified for the final tournament. The final best-of-five series was contested between the Sterling Global Dragons and the Station 751. The former team won 3–1 over the latter.

=== Tekken 7 ===
Eight players qualified for the final tournament. Alexandre Lavarez (PBE|AK) and Andreij Albar (PBE|Doujin) contested in the final match with the latter winning over the former.
