= Edward Russell (television presenter) =

English television presenter (born 1989)

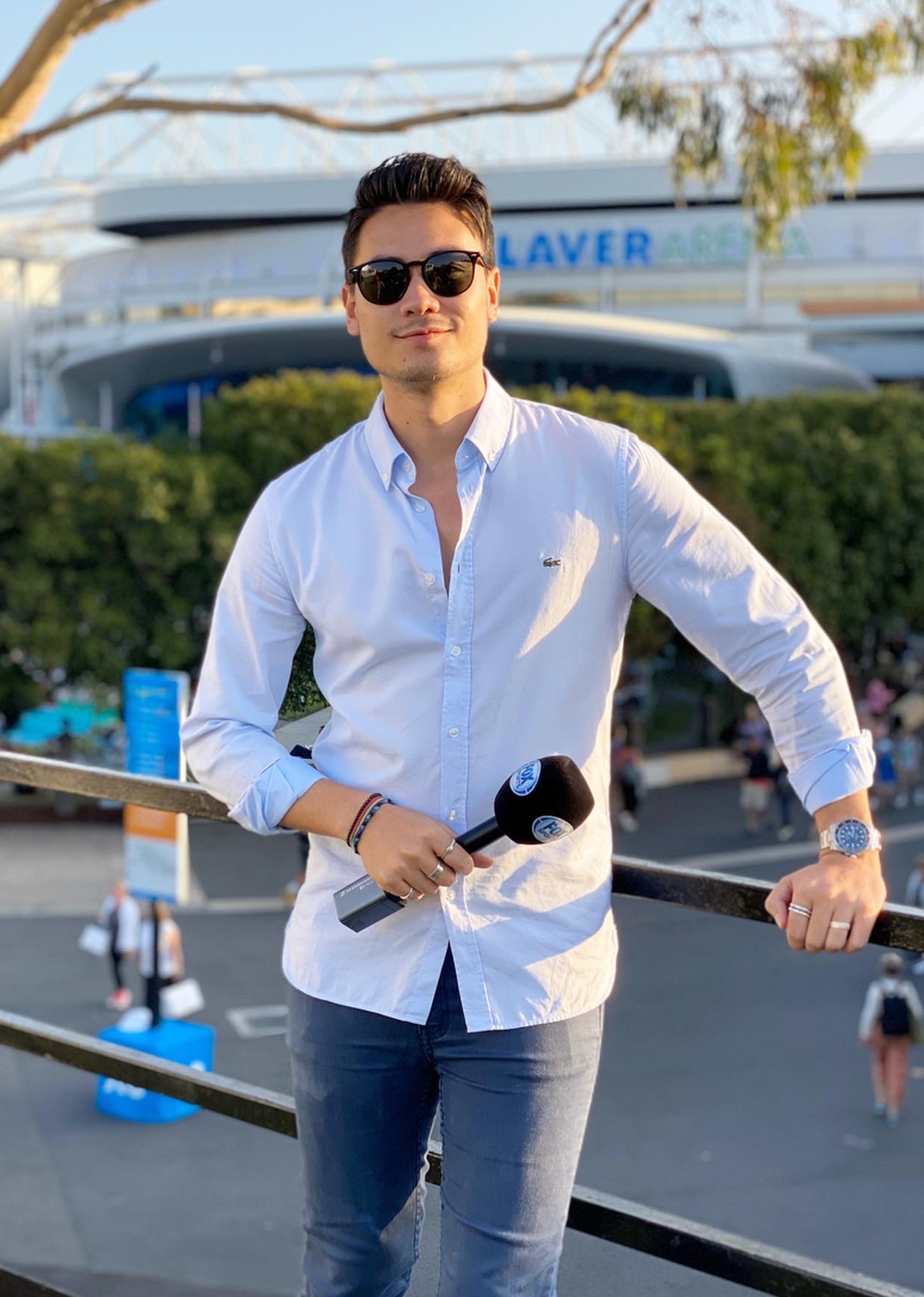
- Russell presenting for Fox Sports Asia at the Australian Open
- Born: 7 September 1989 (age 37); London, England
- Education: University of Western Australia
- Occupation: Television presenter
- Height: 1.84 m (6 ft 0 in)
- Website: edwardrussell.net

Edward Russell (born 7 September 1989) is an English television presenter, host, and actor based in Singapore. He is a presenter on Fox Sports Asia, anchoring Fox Sports Central Asia, and helming their coverage of the MotoGP world championship, Tennis Grand Slams, Formula 1, and Friday Night Football.

He also presents programming for broadcasters including Mediacorp and beIN Sports.

Russell has hosted coverage of international sporting events including The Olympics, The FIFA World Cup 2026, The Commonwealth Games and The Southeast Asian Games. In these roles, he has interviewed sporting figures including Roger Federer, Rafael Nadal, Lewis Hamilton, Valentino Rossi and Son Heung-min

He also co-hosts the weekday radio programme Cartunes on Mediacorp's Class 95 with Jean Danker.

== Early life ==
After attending The Perse School in Cambridge, Russell completed his secondary studies at Hale School and then attended the University of Western Australia, where he graduated with a Bachelor of Arts, a Bachelor of Commerce, and a postgraduate English degree with First-Class Honours.

== Career ==
After completing his degree, Russell moved to Singapore in 2012 and began working as a model before transitioning into television presenting.

=== Television ===
Russell is a presenter on Fox Sports Asia, where he helms their live coverage of the MotoGP World Championship, alongside pundit Matteo Guerinoni.

He also anchors the channel's flagship show Fox Sports Central Asia, presents Friday Night Football and reports onsite from various sporting events including Formula 1, AFF Championship, Australian Open and French Open.

For beIN Sports, Russell hosts their Formula 1 show Off The Grid.. He also hosts their Grand Slam Tennis show Off The Court.

Russell also presents sports coverage for Mediacorp, including broadcasts of the Olympic Games, the FIFA World Cup, the Commonwealth Games, the Asian Games, and the Southeast Asian Games.

In addition to sports broadcasting, he has presented travel programming and has hosted live events for sporting organisations and competitions, including Tour de France, Tottenham Hotspur, Arsenal, and the Premier League.

== Personal life ==
Russell has been selected as one of Cleo magazine's "Bachelors of the Year". and Nüyou magazine's "Men We Love".
