= 2020 The Nationals =

Esports league season

2020 The Nationals season
- League: The Nationals
- Sport: Electronic sports
- TV partner(s): One Sports, GG Network
- Tekken 7 champions: AK (Laus Playbook)
- Tekken 7 runners-up: Maru (Bren)

Seasons
- ← 2019 2021 →

The 2020 The Nationals is the second season of The Nationals, an electronic sports (Esports) league in the Philippines. The season features three titles, Dota 2, Mobile Legends: Bang Bang, and Tekken 7. The season will run from September 5 to sometime around December 2020.

== Impact of the COVID-19 pandemic ==
The start of the season was delayed due to the COVID-19 pandemic. The schedule of the league was condensed due to the delay a single tournament or conference to be held for each of the three titles unlike the previous season which featured two conferences per title.

Competitors will play from their own respective locations instead of gathering in a specific venue with a studio setting as precaution against COVID-19.

== Teams ==
The following six teams will compete in the 2020 season.

- Bren Epro
- Happy Feet Emperors
- STI eOlympians
- PLDT–Smart Omega
- Cignal Ultra Warriors
- Laus Auto Group Playbook Esports Eagles

== Conferences ==
=== Tekken 7 ===
The Tekken 7 tournament was the first tournament to be played for the 2020 season. It was decided that Tekken 7 was to be held first due to the involvement of less players compared to team-oriented titles such as Dota 2 and Mobile Legends.

Laus Playbook's AK (Alexandre Laverez) and Bren Esports' Maru (Maru Sy) contested the best of five finals with AK clinching the Tekken 7 conference title. AK won 3–1 against Maru.

=== Dota 2 ===
The Dota 2 tournament will be the second tournament to be played for the 2020 season.

=== Mobile Legends: Bang Bang ===
The Mobile Legends: Bang Bang tournament will be the last tournament to be played for the 2020 season.
