= 2K19 =

2K19 may refer to:

- the year 2019
- NBA 2K19, video game
- WWE 2K19, video game
