= The Nationals (esports) =

ESports league in the Philippines

- Current season, competition or edition: 2022 The Nationals
- Sport: Esports
- Founded: 2018
- First season: 2019
- Folded: 2022
- President: Kevin Chung
- Commissioner: Ren Vitug
- No. of teams: 6
- Country: Philippines
- Broadcasters: eGG Network; 5 Plus
- Level on pyramid: 1
- Relegation to: None
- Related competitions: Challenger Series; Academy Series
- Website: Official Website, archived from the original on June 1, 2021

The Nationals is an electronic sports (Esports) league in the Philippines which had its inaugural season in 2019. It is the first franchise-based electronic sports in the Philippines. The tournaments are sanctioned by the Esports National Association of the Philippines (ESNAP).

== History ==
=== Establishment ===
The Nationals was first announced in June 2018 with its inaugural season which began in the first quarter of 2019. The league was announced to feature four titles. The Nationals was envisioned to act as the main pool for national Esports athletes who could compete for the Philippines in international tournaments such as the Asian Games.

The league had six founding corporations:

- TheNet.Com
- HappyFeet Esports
- BrenPro Inc.
- Cignal TV Inc.
- PLDT Inc.
- STI Education Systems Holdings, Inc.
- Gambit Esports

=== The Nationals (2019–2022) ===
The inaugural 2019 season commenced on March 24, 2019, featuring three video game titles. Two conferences were held for each title. Both double round-robin group stage and single-elimination playoffs were adopted as the competition format with the top players in each title and conference playing against each other in the season finale. Six teams entered for the inaugural season, with STI joining mid-season after the Dota2 competition.

For the 2021 season, two divisions were introduced opening The Nationals to non-professionals; These divisions are: The Challenger Series which was open to amateurs and the Academy Series which was for players who are enrolled in schools at the time of their participation. The Nationals Draft Series will be introduced with the top players of the Challenger and Academy series eligible to enter.

The Nationals would introduce a new title, Call of Duty: Mobile for the 2022 season. It would join the three titles present in its lineup since its inaugural season.

== Teams ==
The six founding corporate partners of The Nationals fielded teams for the inaugural season of the Esports tournament. As of August 2018, two more franchise slots are still open which if filled would see eight teams participating in The Nationals. The six participating franchise teams including a new team, Suha, were confirmed by Gariath Concepts in February 2019. A team of one of the founding corporate founders.

Team	Company	First season
Bren EPro	BrenPro Inc.	2019
Cignal Ultra Warriors	Cignal TV Inc.	2019
Happy Feet Emperors	HappyFeet Esports	2019
Smart Omega	Smart Communications	2019
STI eOlympians	STI Education Systems Holdings, Inc.	2019
Laus Auto Group Playbook Esports Eagles	Laus Auto Group / PlayBook Esports	2020

Team	Company	Last Season
Suha-XCTN Punishers	–	2019

== Organization ==
=== Format ===
The league follows a franchise model, the first Esports league in the Philippines to adopt this format. Other franchised based leagues in the country are the Philippine Basketball Association, the Philippine Super Liga, Premier Volleyball League, and the Philippine Football League. The Nationals is recognized by the Esports National Association of the Philippines

=== Video game titles ===
Three titles, belonging to three categories: PC gaming, Mobile gaming, Console gaming, are the main Esports titles played in The Nationals. Gariath Concepts will handle the operations and logistics of the league.

Three titles were featured in The Nationals upon the launch of its inaugural season in 2019: Dota 2 for PC Gaming and Mobile Legends for Mobile gaming and Tekken 7 for the Console gaming category. NBA 2K19 was also proposed to be played in The Nationals. A fourth title, Call of Duty: Mobile was introduced in the 2022 season.

The Nationals video game titles
Title	Category
Call of Duty: Mobile	Mobile Gaming
Dota 2	PC Gaming
Mobile Legends: Bang Bang	Mobile Gaming
Tekken 7	Console Gaming

== Record ==
Season	Year	Dota 2	Mobile Legends: Bang Bang	Tekken 7	Call of Duty: Mobile
1	2019	Cignal Ultra Warriors	Cignal Ultra Warriors	Alexandre "AK" Laverez	—N/a
1	2019	Suha-Execration Punishers	Bren Epro	Alexandre "AK" Laverez	—N/a
2	2020	Cignal Ultra Warriors	Bren Epro	AK (Laus Playbook)	—N/a
3	2021	—N/a	Cignal Ultra Warriors	AK (Laus Playbook)	—N/a
4	2022	—N/a	—N/a	—N/a	Smart Omega

== Broadcasting rights ==
The Nationals has been broadcast at 5 Plus on ESPN 5 in the Philippines. League matches were also aired at the One Sports through Cignal TV and Cablelink for Philippine-based viewers as well as eGG Network for the viewers across Southeast Asia and Australia. Matches of Road of The Nationals were aired live in the country on ESPN 5.
