= Colette Wong =

Singaporean sports journalist

- Born: Colette Wong; 21 May 1974 (age 52); Singapore
- Education: University College Dublin
- Occupations: Reporter, Sportscaster, TV Host
- Years active: 1996–present
- Television: SportsCenter Asia Co-anchor (2004–2013); Fox Sports Central Asia Anchor (2013–2021); Nokia Football Crazy Host (2005–2008)
- Spouse: Luigi Ferrandi

Colette Wong (born 21 May 1974) is a Singaporean sports reporter, TV host, and sports anchor for Fox Sports Asia and Fox Sports News Asia. She was formerly anchor for Fox Sports Central Asia and a news correspondent for CNBC Asia.

== Life and career ==
Wong was born in Singapore on 21 May 1974. Colette graduated from Catholic Junior College in 1992 and University College Dublin, where she finished Bachelor of Arts (Hons), Politics and Economics in 1996.

Wong got her first job in December 1996, as a sports reporter, producer and presenter for Television Corporation of Singapore's Singapore Television Twelve, from 1996 to 2000. Colette later became the news correspondent for CNBC Asia from 2001 to 2003.

ESPN Star Sports later hired Wong in March 2004, as the anchorwoman for SportsCenter Asia with Jason Dasey, then she became the host of Nokia Football Crazy from 2005 to 2008. Wong later became one of the lead anchors of Fox Sports Central Asia when ESPN became Fox Sports Asia in 2013. She was the winner of the ‘Best Sports Presenter/Commentator’ award at the 21st Asian TV Awards in 2016 and 'highly commended' in the 'Best sports presenter/commentator' section of the 18th Asian Television Awards 2013.

== Personal life ==
Wong is married to sales manager Luigi Ferrandi. They have two children.

== Filmography ==
- SportsCenter Asia (2004–2013) ESPN Asia
- Nokia Football Crazy (2005–2008) ESPN Asia
- Fox Sports Central Asia (2013–2021) Fox Sports Asia

== See also ==
- Fox Sports Asia
