= Korean Australians =

Ethnic group

Korean Australians 한국계 호주인

Total population
- 102,092 (by birth in South Korea, 2021); 81 (by birth in North Korea, 2021); 102,745 (by ancestry, 2021)

Regions with significant populations
- Sydney, Melbourne, Brisbane, Perth, Adelaide

Languages
- Korean, Australian English

Religion
- 40.4% No religion 25.1% Protestant; 16.8% Catholic

Related ethnic groups
- Korean diaspora
- Includes Presbyterian (18.7%) and Uniting Church (6.4%)

- Korean Australians
- Hangul: 한국계 호주인
- Hanja: 韓國系 濠洲人
- Revised Romanization: Hanguk-gye Hojeu-in
- McCune–Reischauer: Han'guk-kye Hoju-in
- IPA: [ha̠nɡu̠k̚.k͈je̞ ɦo̞.d͡ʑu.in]

People with Korean ancestry as a percentage of the population in Sydney divided geographically by postal area, as of the 2011 census

Korean Australians (Korean: 한국계 호주인, romanized: Hanguk-gye Hojeu-in) are Australian citizens who trace their Korean ancestry and identify themselves as an immigrant to or a descendant born in Australia.

Korean Australians are a major Asian Australian community. According to the 2021 Australian census, 102,745 people claimed Korean ancestry, with 102,905 people reporting being born in South Korea alongside 81 people claiming to be North Korean defectors.

== History ==
There is some evidence of the presence of a small number of Koreans in Australia as early as 1920. While it is unclear what prompted their arrival they may have been the children of Australian Protestant missionaries who began work in Korea around 1885. A few also came to Australia between 1921 and 1941 for education. Additionally, scant evidence of individual Koreans living in areas of Australia like Broome in the years prior to the Second World War has also been recorded. Three Korean speakers in the 2021 Australian census listed 1945 as their year of arrival in Australia, which could be further evidence of early Korean immigration to Australia.

During World War II (1941–1945), an unknown number of Koreans who had been arrested in Allied countries across the Asia–Pacific Region were transported to Australia and interned alongside Japanese and Formosans for the duration of the war. Most Korean internees carried Japanese names, and were thus difficult to identify.

When the Korean War ended, in between 1951 and 1960, 20 Koreans came to Australia. The relaxation of immigration restrictions in the late 1960s provided the first opportunity for larger numbers of Koreans to enter Australia. In 1969, the first Korean immigrants arrived in Sydney under the Skilled Migration Program. However, there were only 468 Korean born people recorded as living in Australia at the time of the 1971 Census.

In the early 1970s, about 1000 Koreans arrived each year for short-term stays (mostly as students) and around 100 arrived for permanent residence. Some of these new arrivals subsequently sponsored family members for migration. Between 1976 and 1985, around 500 Korea-born immigrants arrived each year resulting in the number of Korea-born living in Australia increasing more than sixfold between the 1976 Census (1460) and the 1986 Census (9290).

From 1986 to 1991, there was a further increase in settler arrivals, with an average of about 1400 each year, many coming under the Skilled and Business migration categories. More than half of the Korea-born in Australia have arrived in the last ten years, including as students.

== Demographics ==
As of the 2021 census, 102,789 persons resident in Australia identified themselves as being of Korean ancestry. 102,096 persons resident in Australia had been born in South Korea. 49.6% declared holding Australian citizenship. 14.2% of them came to Australia in the 1990s, 36.4% in the 2000s, 17.6% in the 2011-2015, and 16.7% in 2016-2021s. They make up 1.4% of the 7.5 million of the residents from overseas, and 0.4% out of the entire 25.7 million population.

The majority reside in New South Wales. Few ethnic groups are as concentrated in one state as Koreans are in New South Wales, where 33% of Australia's population live.

In 2021, 41,316 (40.5%) Korean-born Australian residents self-identified as "No Religion," 19,400 (18.7%) as Presbyterian or Reformed, 17,156 (16.8%) as Catholic, 6,506 (6.4%) as Uniting Church, and 4,244 (4.2%) as "Christianity, not further defined." Koreans have often created their own religious organizations in Australia, due to language and cultural barriers, and not always being welcomed by the mainstream population. The first Korean Buddhist temple was established in 1986. The first Korean Christian church was established in 1974 and by 2009, 151 exist in Sydney and about the same elsewhere in Australia.

== Notable people ==
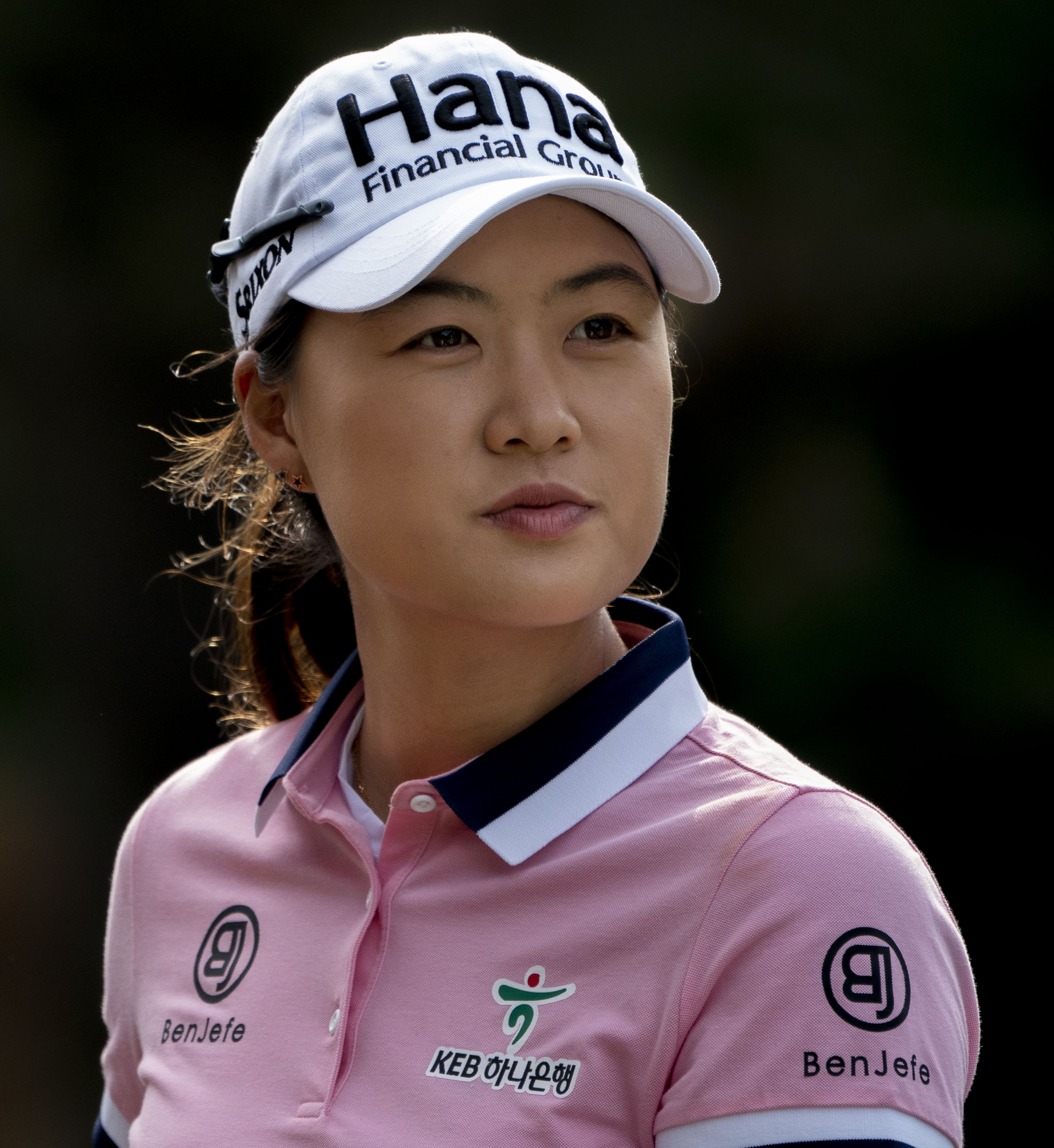
Minjee Lee

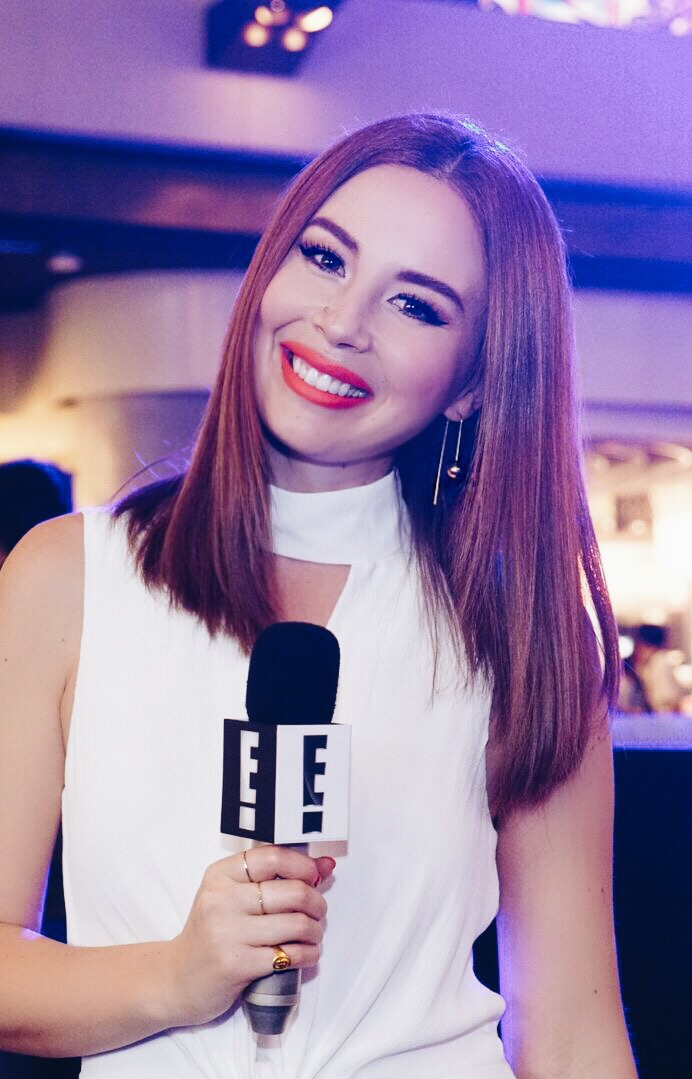
Yvette King

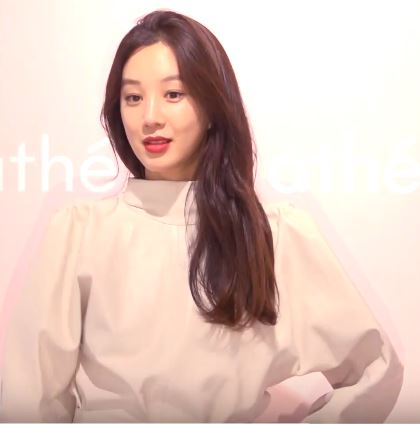
Jung Ryeo-won

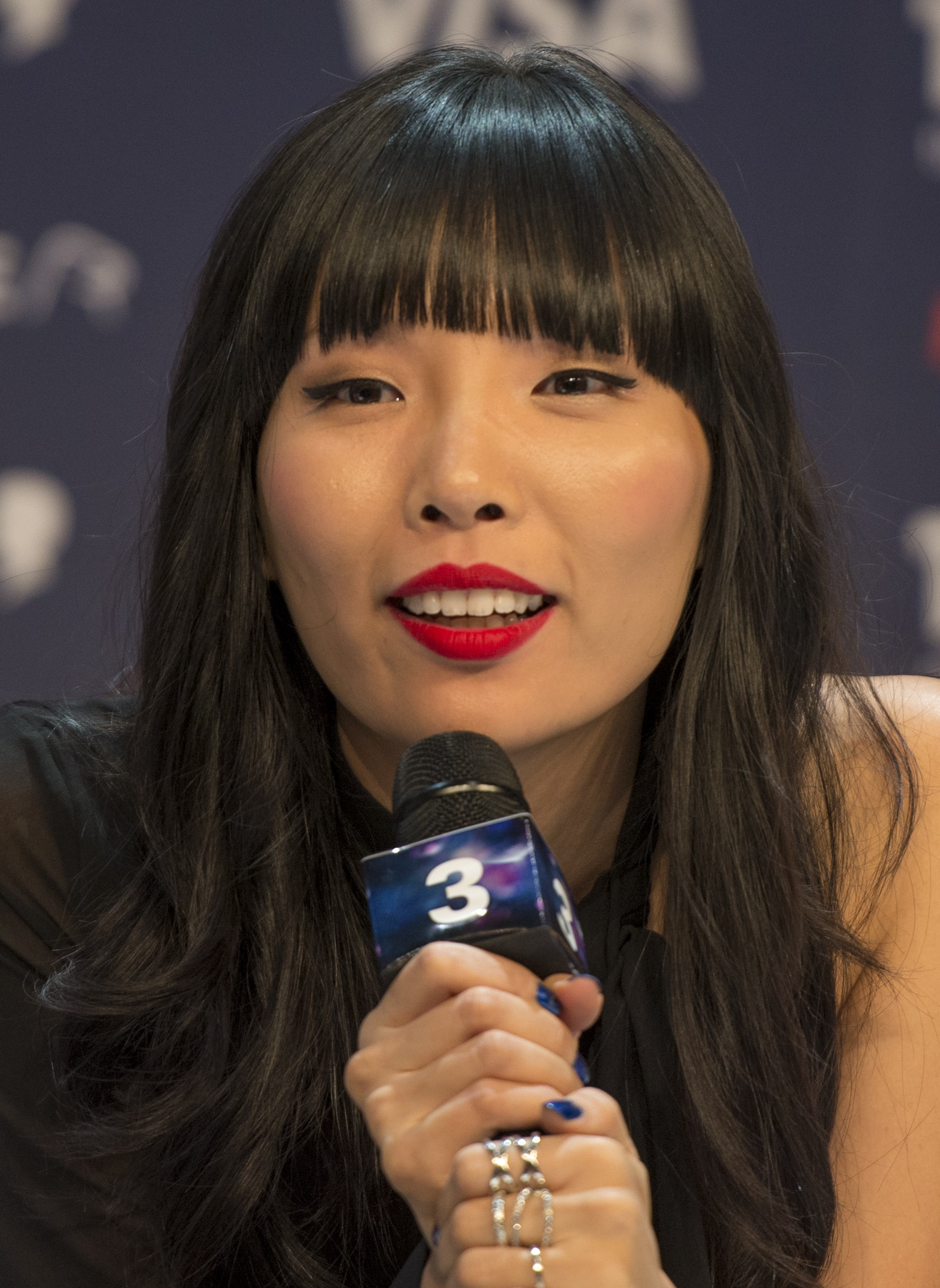
Dami Im

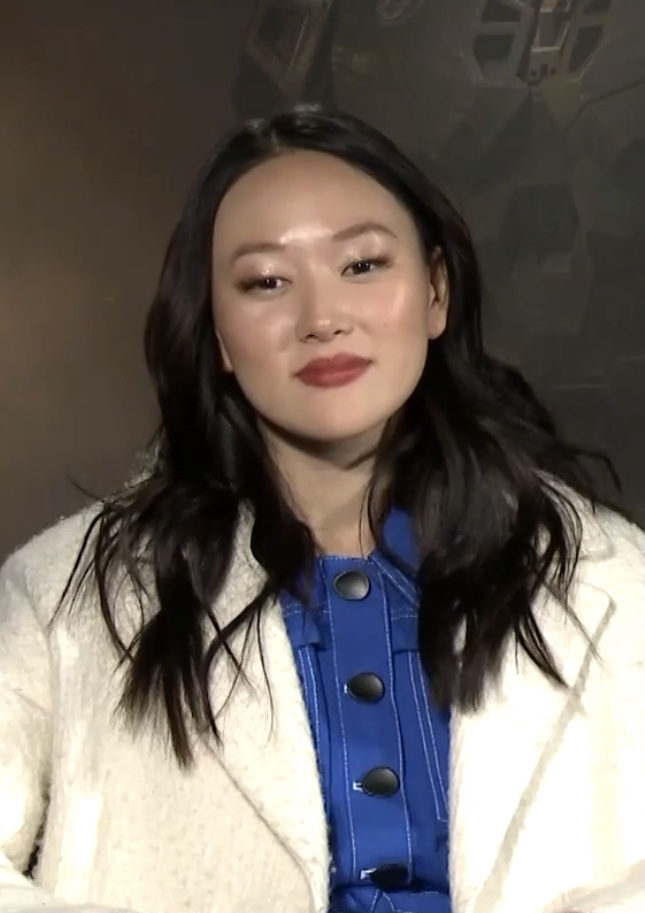
Yerin Ha

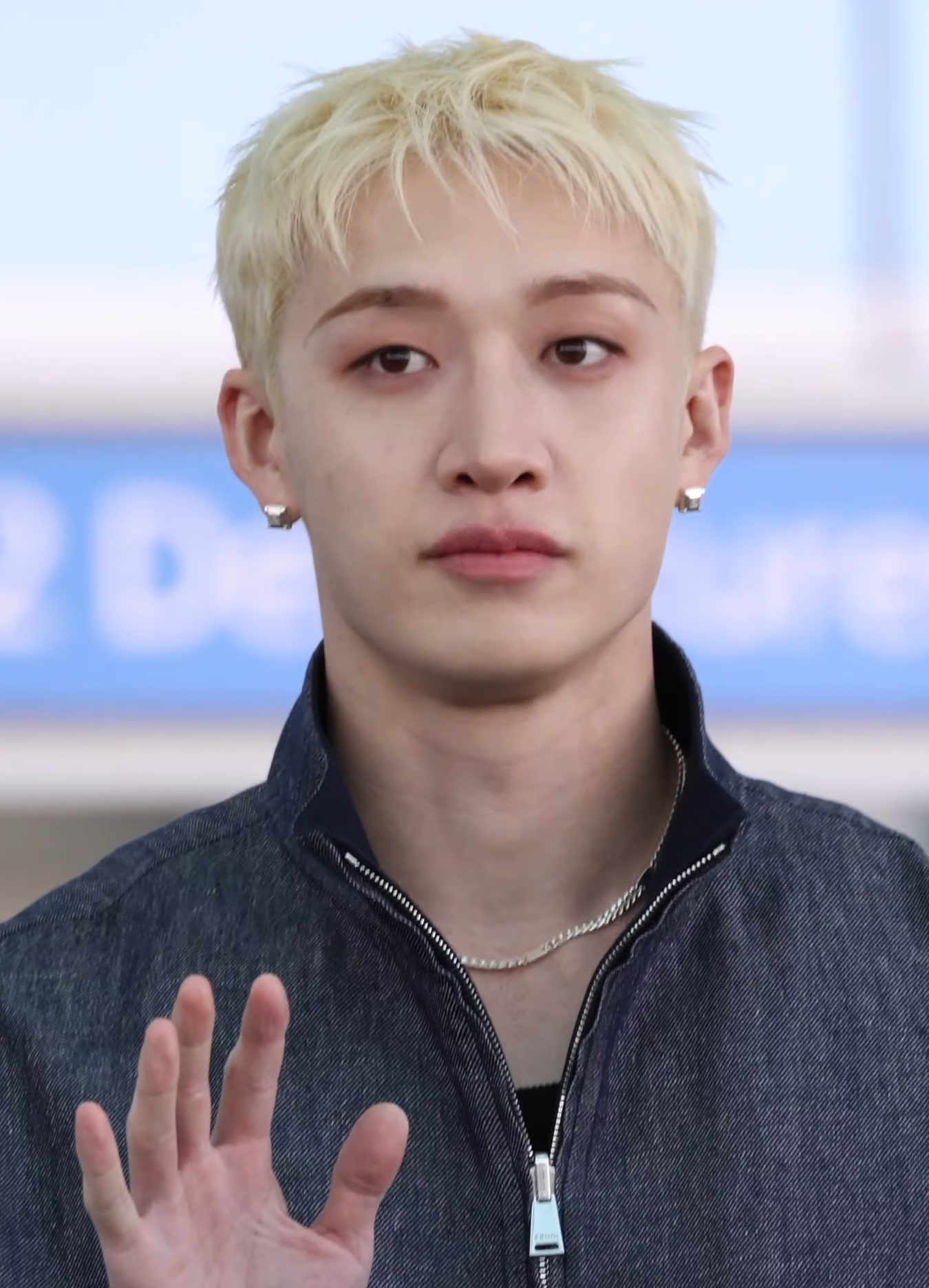
Bang Chan

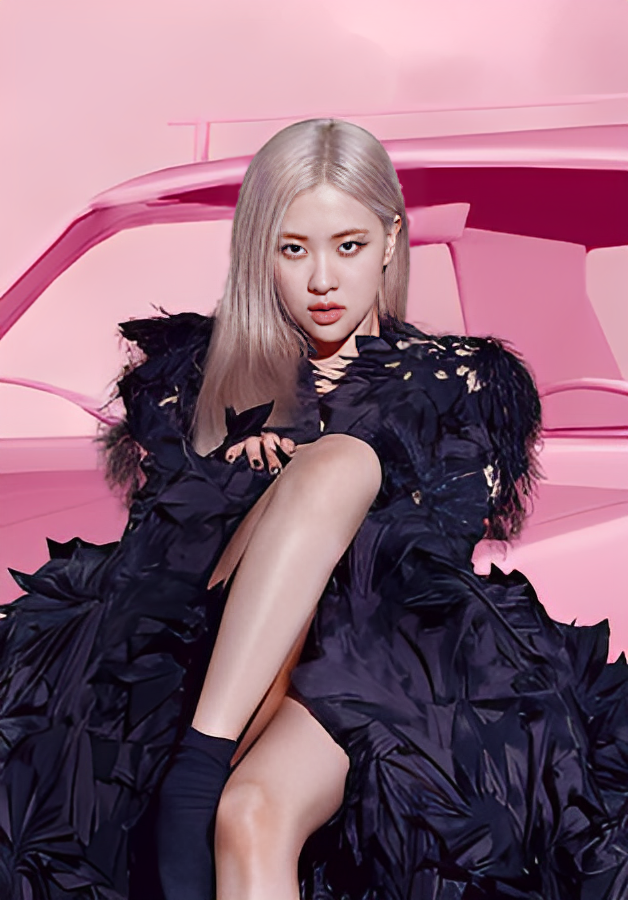
Rosé

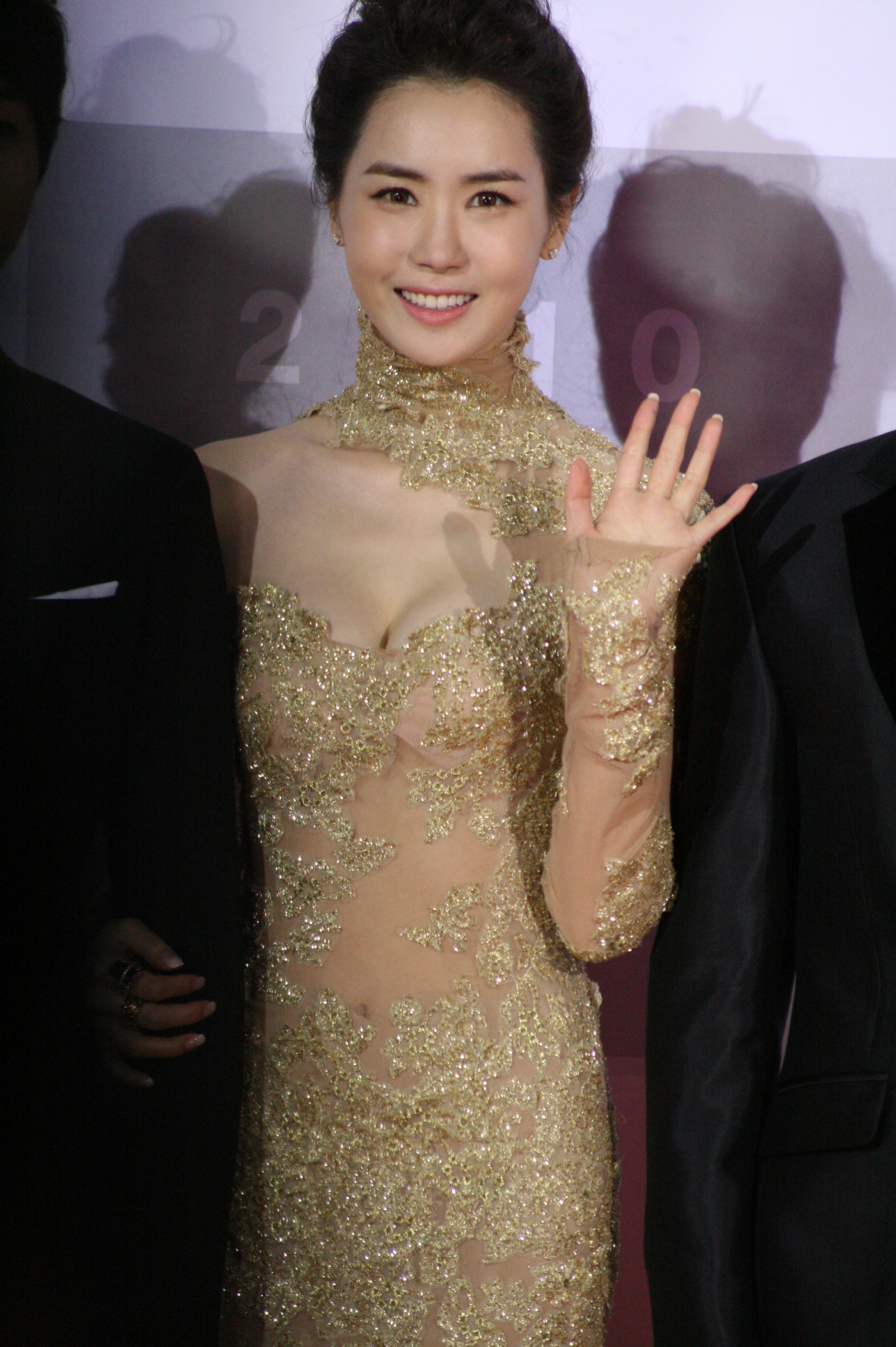
Lee Da-hae

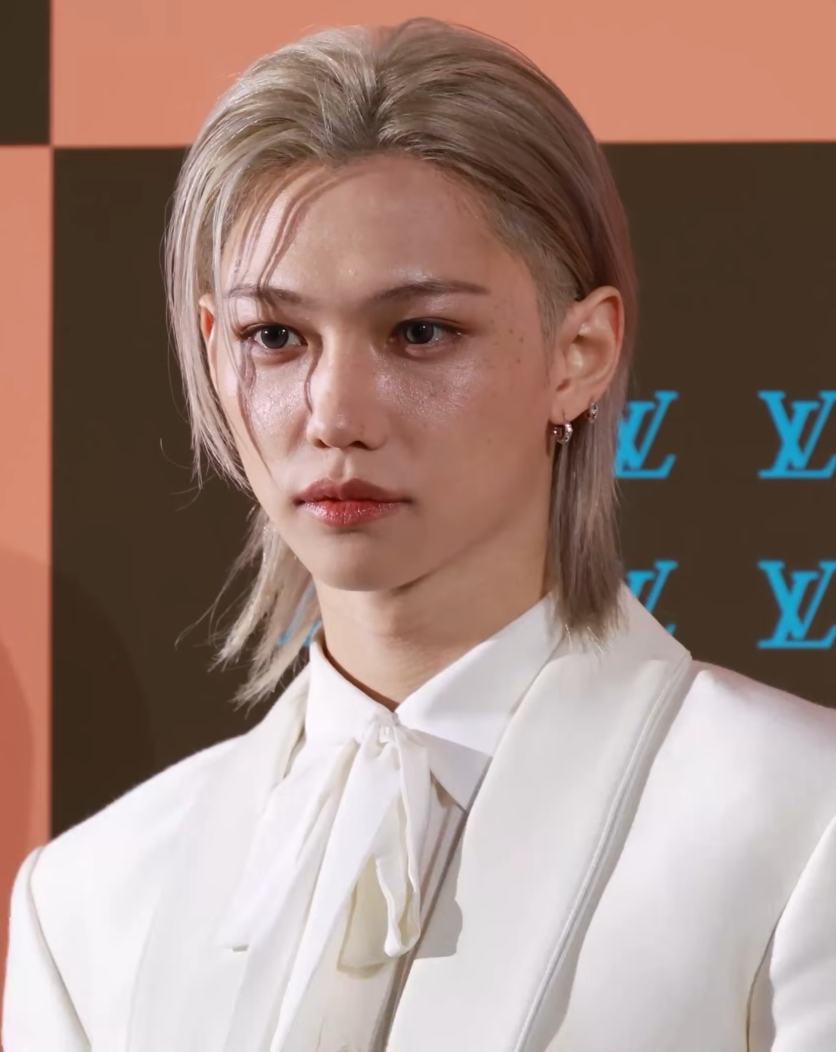
Felix Lee

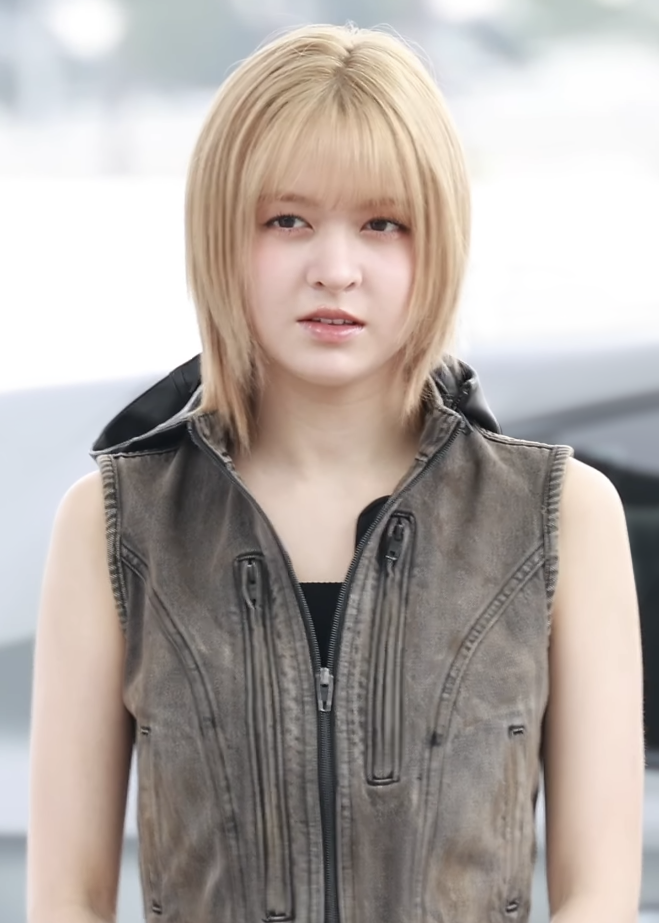
Lily

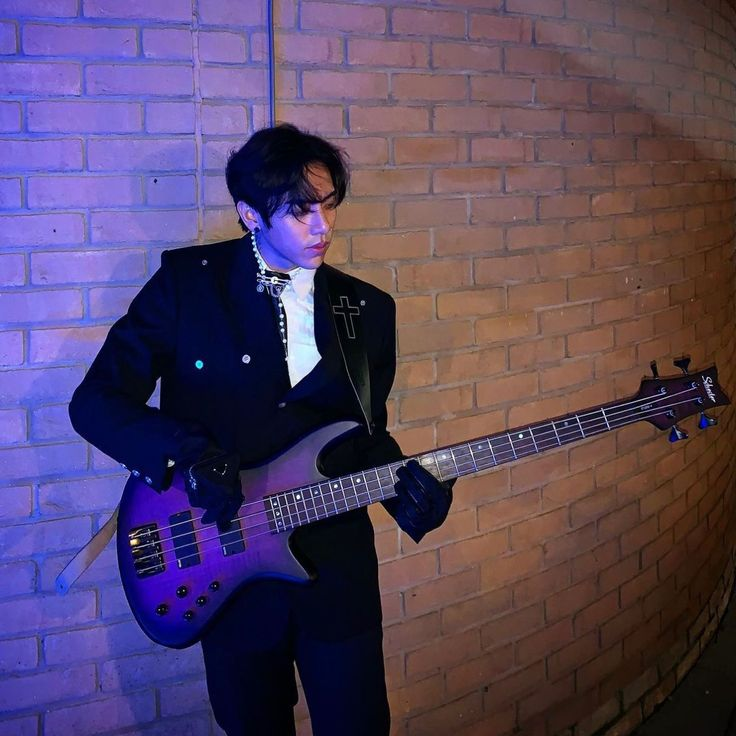
DPR Ian

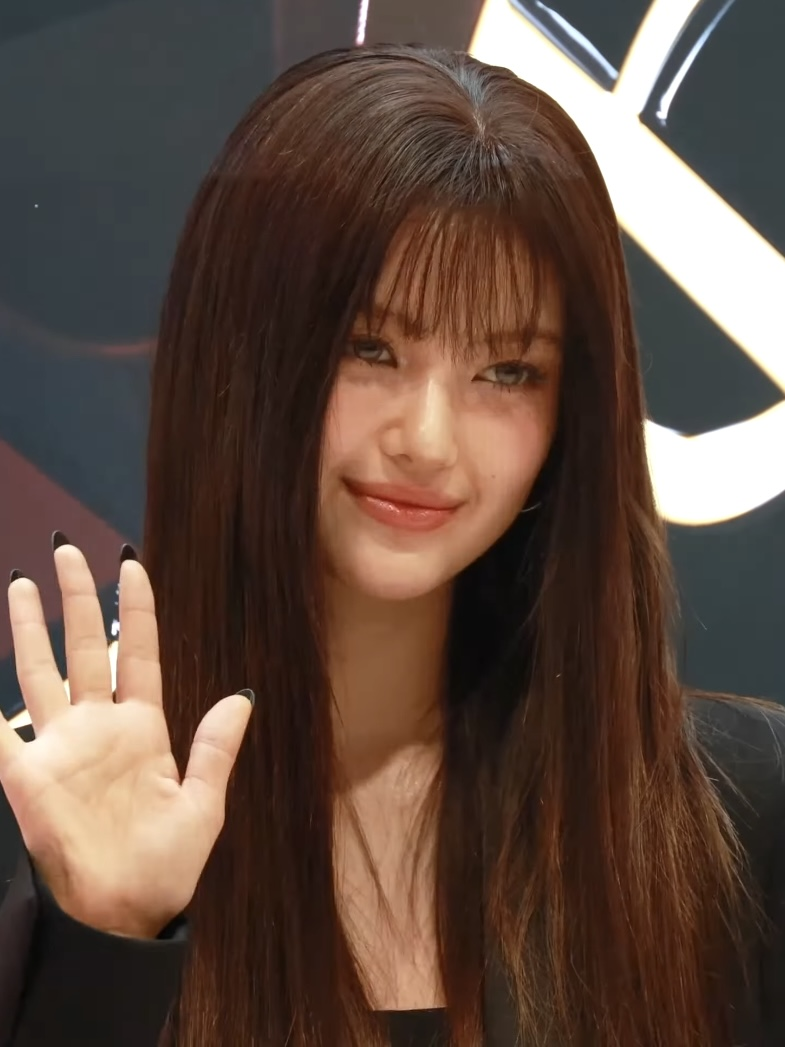
Danielle Marsh

- Peter Bell, former Australian rules football player who played for Fremantle and the North Melbourne.
- Bang Chan (Christopher Bang), leader of South Korean boy group Stray Kids.
- Yerin Ha, actress
- Alicia Hannah-Kim, actress
- Yang Hi Choe-Wall, Koreanist and professor of Korean studies.
- Dami Im, winner of the 2013 Australian X Factor and runner-up of the 2016 Eurovision Song Contest.
- Elizabeth Lee, A member of the Australian Capital Territory Legislative Assembly. Currently serving as the Leader of the Opposition in her capacity as Leader of the Canberra Liberals.
- David Kang, barrister who feigned an attack on Prince Charles with a starting pistol in 1994.
- Sky Kim, Olympic archer
- Yvette King, television presenter and entertainment journalist
- Felix Lee, member of South Korean boy group Stray Kids.
- Lee Da-hae, actress
- Minjee Lee, professional golfer
- Min Woo Lee, professional golfer
- Leonardo Nam, Korean Argentine actor who emigrated to Australia; born in Buenos Aires.
- Rosé (Roseanne Park), New Zealand born member of the South Korean girl group Blackpink
- Sun Park, former Hi-5 member.
- Jung Ryeo-won, actress and singer active in South Korea. Born in Seoul and raised in Brisbane.
- Dayen Zheng, former Hi-5 member.
- Jang Hanbyul, former member of South Korean boy group Ledapple.
- Hayana (Kristine Yoon), former member of South Korean girl group EvoL.
- DPR Ian, singer and director.
- Kevin Kim, former member of South Korean boy group ZE:A.
- Cho Jun Young (Young Sky), member of South Korean R&B/hip hop group One Way.
- Peter Hyun, member of South Korean R&B/hip hop group One Way.
- Hany Lee, actress (Neighbours).
- Ray Ahn, member of Australian rock bands Hard-Ons and Nunchukka Superfly
- Jake Sim, member of South Korean boy group ENHYPEN. Born in Seoul and raised in Brisbane.
- Danielle Marsh, member of South Korean girl group NewJeans.
- Lily Morrow, member of South Korean girl group NMIXX.
- Mackiah Mercer, member of South Korean boy group Ampers&One.
- Woo Kyungjun, former member of South Korean boy group TNX.
- Steven Kim, member of South Korean boy group AHOF and former member of Luminous.

== See also ==
- Korean New Zealanders
- Strathfield
- Australia–North Korea relations
- Australia–South Korea relations
