= Fox Sports Asia =

Defunct Southeast Asian pay television network

- Country: China; Malaysia; Singapore
- Broadcast area: Southeast Asia; Hong Kong; Taiwan
- Network: Fox Sports International

Programming
- Languages: English; Chinese; Malay; Indonesian; Thai; Vietnamese
- Picture format: 1080i (HDTV)

Ownership
- Owner: Fox Networks Group Asia Pacific (Disney International Operations)
- Sister channels: List: Star Chinese Movies (closed); Fox Life (closed); Fox Crime (closed); FX (closed); Fox (closed); Channel V (closed); National Geographic; Nat Geo Wild; Nat Geo People (closed); Fox Movies (closed); Fox Action Movies (closed); Fox Family Movies (closed)

History
- Launched: 21 August 1991; 35 years ago (Star Sports, Fox Sports 2); 1 June 1992; 34 years ago (ESPN, Fox Sports)
- Closed: 31 December 2020; 5 years ago (Taiwan); 1 October 2021; 5 years ago (Southeast Asia Hong Kong) and (Malaysia)
- Replaced by: Astro SuperSport 5 (Astro, Malaysia); Eurosport (Asia); Premier Sports (Philippines); SPOTV (Southeast Asia); ESPN Asia (digital service via social networking sites, YouTube); Disney+ (via ESPN hub)
- Former names: Fox Sports: ESPN Asia (1992–2013); Fox Sports 2: Prime Sports (1991–1996); Star Sports (1996–2014); Fox Sports 3: ESPN HD (until 2013); Fox Sports Plus HD (2013–2014); Fox Sports News (2013–2017); ESPN News (1996–2013)

Links
- Website: global.espn.com

Fox Sports Asia (formerly ESPN Star Sports) was a pan-Asian pay television network operated by Fox Networks Group Asia Pacific, a subsidiary of The Walt Disney Company (Southeast Asia) Pte. Ltd. It also oversaw a version of Star Sports available in mainland China and South Korea.

The network was originally launched in 1991 as Star Sports (previously Prime Sports) and ESPN by Satellite Television Asian Region (Star TV) and ESPN International. The two companies combined their Asian operations in October 1996. News Corporation assumed full control of the venture in 2012 and relaunched the channels in two phases, in January 2013 and August 2014.

== History ==
=== Early years ===
==== Star Sports ====
In March 1991, HutchVision announced it would jointly operate a sports channel with Denver-based Prime Network International, to be distributed in more than 30 Asian countries, reaching an audience of nearly three billion.

Star Sports was first launched on 21 August 1991 as Prime Sports (體育台), and its first broadcast was the US Open tennis tournament. Operated by Hong Kong–based company Star TV, the channel was a 24-hour multi-sport television channel broadcasting in English and Chinese. It was carried on AsiaSat 1 and could be reached from the Far East to the Middle East. Star TV later regionalized the service to better serve its audience.

On 1 February 1996, the channel changed its logo from the original 1991 design to a box-type Star symbol featuring a frame, a star, and a square.

On 1 April 1999, the channel introduced its first major logo redesign, changing from a vertical to a horizontal layout, consistent with other Star TV channels.

During this time, the feed was used in both Southeast Asia and the Chinese region (Taiwan and China) until it was split into two dedicated channels on 31 March 2001.

==== ESPN ====
ESPN was part of the "Gang of Five", a consortium formed with CNN International, HBO, TVB (with TVB Superchannel), and the Australian Broadcasting Corporation (with Australia Television International), to compete against Star TV in the region. The group's channels were initially transmitted via the Palapa satellite, and later also via the Apstar satellite.

ESPN opened its production facility at New Tech Park in Lorong Chuan, Singapore, in May 1995.

=== Operations combined as ESPN Star Sports ===
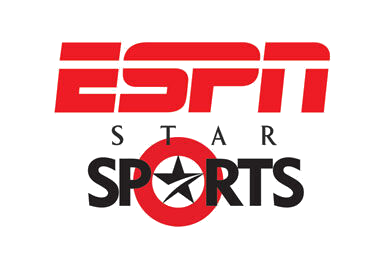
Logo of ESPN & Star Sports (2009–2013)

ESPN and Star Sports were competing with each other across Asia, but their businesses were operating at a loss. In October 1996, both channels agreed to combine their operations in the region. The resulting joint venture, later named ESPN Star Sports, was headquartered in Singapore (where ESPN's operations in Asia were based).

On 16 January 1998, a version of Fox Sports launched in the Middle East, carried by Star Select. This replaced ESPN Star Sports in the region, but the pan-Asian version was available via the AsiaSat and Palapa satellites.

=== Relaunch as Fox Sports ===
On 6 June 2012, News Corporation announced it would buy ESPN International's share in ESPN Star Sports. Later, Star India took over ESPN Star Sports' businesses in India and relaunched its sports channels under the Star Sports brand on 6 November 2013.

In October 2012, Fox Football Channel was launched in Malaysia. The channel ceased transmission in 2015.

On 28 January 2013, ESPN and ESPN HD were relaunched as Fox Sports and Fox Sports Plus HD in Hong Kong, Taiwan, and Southeast Asia. The regional version of ESPNews was relaunched as Fox Sports News, and SportsCenter Asia was relaunched as Fox Sports Central.

On 15 August 2014, Star Sports was rebranded as Fox Sports 2, and Fox Sports Plus HD was renamed Fox Sports 3 (or Fox Sports HD in Vietnam). The corresponding HD and SD versions of all three channels were also launched. This rebranding did not affect much of East Asia: a version of Star Sports continued to broadcast to mainland China and South Korea, and the ESPN feed for Mainland China was renamed as Star Sports 2 on 10 January 2014.

ESPN International has since refocused on its digital business by developing online properties for football (ESPNFC), cricket (CricInfo), Formula One (ESPNF1), and Australian rugby union (ESPNscrum), and established a partnership with Multi Screen Media in India (Sony ESPN TV channel until 31 March 2020), TV5 Network in the Philippines (ESPN5 programming division until 13 October 2021), Tencent in mainland China (a dedicated ESPN section at qq.com), and Mediacorp in Singapore (local ad sales only for the ESPN website through its Partner Network division).

On 31 March 2020, the website of Fox Sports Asia merged with the global ESPN website. Fox Sports Asia's social media accounts remained unaffected.

On 8 March 2021, Fox Sports partnered with Emtek's OTT media service, Vidio, to make the networks available for Indonesian viewers.

=== Closure ===
On 18 September 2020, Disney announced that it would shut down Fox Sports operations in Taiwan at the end of 2020. It was later revealed that operations in Taiwan would end on 1 January 2021, following years of financial losses in the region.

On 27 April 2021, Disney announced that the Fox Sports network, along with the rest of the Fox channels, would permanently cease operations on 1 October after 30 years of broadcasting. This move folded the former Prime Sports/Star Sports Asia and ESPN Asia channel spaces as Disney shifted focus to its streaming platform, Disney+ (or Disney+ Hotstar in Indonesia, Malaysia, and Thailand; the launch in Vietnam had not yet been announced). The last events covered by the channel were the 2021 Russian Grand Prix (Formula One), the 2021 Superbike World Championship at Circuito de Jerez, and UFC 266: Volkanovski vs. Ortega.

Prior to the shutdown, Korean sports network SPOTV acquired the rights to broadcast the remainder of the 2021 MotoGP World Championship, taking over the Fox Sports network's place once its transmission went offline; this ensured the remaining MotoGP races were broadcast. They also carried the Superbike World Championship. Vietnam had no TV broadcaster for MotoGP until SPOTV officially launched on 24 December 2023.

Hong Kong pay TV provider Now TV picked up coverage of the 2021 US Open, the remaining races of the 2021 Formula One World Championship, and future UFC fights prior to the closure of the Fox Sports network.

The remaining coverage of both Formula One and UFC was aired on Astro in Malaysia on Astro SuperSport 5 (launched post-closure); Premier Sports from the TAP Sports network in the Philippines, which replaced Fox Sports and also secured most of the other rights formerly held by ABS-CBN's sports division whose had sharing several rights with Fox Sports until its winddown following the expiration and subsequent cancellation of legislative broadcast network franchise in 2020; StarHub TV and Singtel TV in Singapore (on Hub Sports and Mio Sports); and TrueVisions' True Sport in Thailand. Mola streamed the remaining UFC fights in Indonesia while also sub-licensing to both Singapore and Malaysia for future live fights, including Dana White's Contender Series; these had not been aired previously when Fox Sports focused on UFC main events. Meanwhile, the Emtek group aired the remaining Formula One races on Champions TV, O Channel (now Moji) and their OTT media service Vidio, which previously carried the Fox Sports network.

As reported exclusively by SportBusiness, Formula One coverage in Hong Kong and Southeast Asia (excluding Vietnam, where K+ owned the rights following the channel's closure) transferred to beIN Sports starting in 2023. beIN Sports also held rights for both the Australian Open and French Open (except in Vietnam, where rights were owned by K+ and VTVcab, respectively), while SPOTV, which was already available across Southeast Asia (excluding Vietnam until 24 December 2023), broadcast Wimbledon and the US Open. The extension for UFC coverage in Southeast Asia had yet to be finalized.

The John Dykes Show was announced to resume on Disney+ Hotstar in Malaysia, Indonesia, and Thailand, and was yet to be announced for other Disney+ territories, including Singapore and Hong Kong, as Star Originals.

A few days after the closure, Disney relaunched the ESPN brand in Asia as a digital media portal through its official YouTube channel and social media pages.

Prior to the announcement of the launch of ESPN hub, Disney has made several deals with regional and international sporting leagues to be made available on Disney+. In November 2025, it was announced that the NBA games would be available to stream on Disney+ in the Philippines. The 2025 edition of the KeSPA Cup League of Legends tournament was exclusive to Disney+, initially in just select Asia-Pacific regions.

In 2026, Disney has announced the launch of the ESPN content hub on the international version of the streaming service Disney+. From September to October 2026, ESPN is set to appear on Disney+ in key Southeast Asian countries following the migration to the global version from Hotstar-derived version. So far, only Singapore and the Philippines have the ESPN hub on the updated version of Disney+.

== Channels ==
- Fox Sports (formerly ESPN)
- Fox Sports 2 (formerly Prime Sports and Star Sports)
- Fox Sports 3 (formerly ESPN HD and Fox Sports Plus HD)
- Fox Sports News (formerly ESPNews): The channel was first launched as ESPNews in November 2009 in Singapore on Singtel's Mio TV, and later expanded to other areas, including Hong Kong, where it launched in August 2011 on PCCW's Now TV. It was renamed Fox Sports News on 28 January 2013. The channel was gradually discontinued in 2017: it ceased broadcasting on 1 April 2017 in most areas, but continued until 24 April in Hong Kong, 3 May in Malaysia, and 31 May in Taiwan.
- Fox Football Channel: The channel launched in October 2012 in Malaysia. Its programming consisted mainly of association football matches and shows. It ceased broadcasting in 2015.

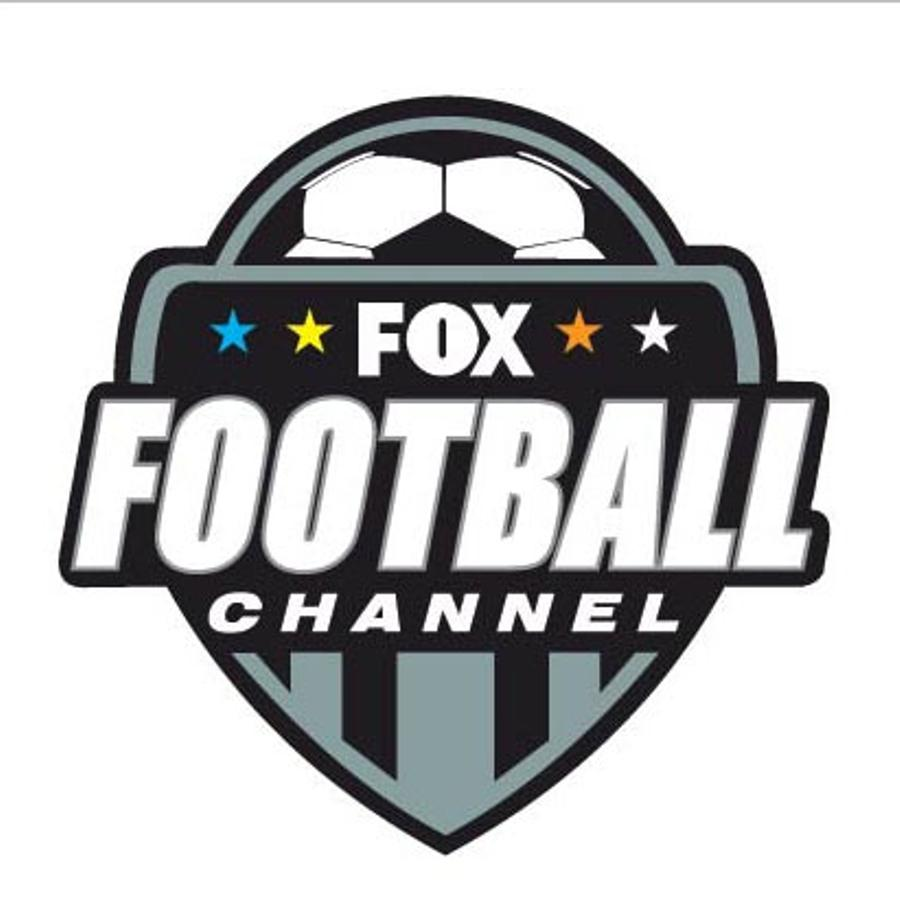
Fox Football Channel logo.

=== Regions ===
The individual regional feeds of Fox Sports channels included:

- Hong Kong: A schedule variant offered to Hong Kong Cable Television customers due to broadcasting rights issues. This variant was transmitted by Fox Networks Group Hong Kong and produced from studios in Hong Kong. The headquarters closed on 1 October 2021.
- Indonesia: This variant was transmitted by Fox Networks Group Indonesia and produced from studios in Indonesia. The headquarters closed on 12 November 2021.
- Malaysia and Brunei: This feed did not provide coverage of field hockey events. This variant was transmitted by Fox Networks Group Malaysia and produced from studios in Malaysia. The headquarters closed on 12 November 2021.
- Philippines: This variant was transmitted by Fox Networks Group Philippines and produced from studios in the Philippines. The headquarters closed on 1 October 2021.
- Singapore: This variant was transmitted by Fox Networks Group Singapore and produced from studios in Singapore. The headquarters closed on 12 November 2021.
- Vietnam: This variant was transmitted by Fox Networks Group Vietnam and produced from studios in Vietnam. The headquarters closed on 1 October 2021 in Hanoi, and 12 November 2021 in Hồ Chí Minh City.
- Taiwan: This variant was transmitted by Fox Networks Group Taiwan and produced from studios in Taipei. The headquarters closed on 1 January 2024.

It also oversaw a version of Star Sports broadcast to mainland China and South Korea, and Star Sports 2 (formerly known as ESPN until 31 December 2014) broadcast to mainland China.

In South Korea, Fox Sports partnered with JTBC until 11 March 2020, which operated JTBC3 Fox Sports (now known as JTBC Golf&Sports). As ESPN Star Sports, it had previously partnered with MBC (MBC ESPN, now known as MBC Sports+) from 2001 until July 2010, and SBS (SBS ESPN, now known as SBS Sports) from late 2010 until 2014.

== Final programming ==
Broadcast rights for various sports properties contain territorial limitations and in many instances, the rights indicated below may not pertain to all Asian territories in which Fox Sports operated.

=== Australian rules football ===
- Australian Football League (except Philippines)

=== Boxing ===
- World Boxing Matches

=== Cricket ===
- ICC
  - Cricket World Cup (all matches available on official website and Fox+, highlights on television)
  - Under-19 Cricket World Cup (all matches available on Fox+, highlights and live coverage of final on television)
  - Women's Cricket World Cup (all matches only available on Fox+, highlights on television)
- Anthony de Mello Trophy
- Border–Gavaskar Trophy
- Sri Lanka T20 matches

=== Football ===
- AFC (only for Brunei, Malaysia, and Singapore through 2024)
- AFF Suzuki Cup (only for Brunei, Indonesia, and Malaysia; Indonesian broadcast was later moved to RCTI, iNews, MNC Sports, and Soccer Channel)
- Danish Super League (one match per week, 2019–2021; originally from June 2020 with the remaining matches in 2019–20)
  - FC Copenhagen (first week of the month)
  - Brøndby IF (second week of the month)
  - FC Midtjylland (third week of the month)
  - Aarhus GF (fourth week of the month)
- DBU Pokalen
- A-League (only for Guam, Mongolia, Northern Marianas, and Palau)

=== Field hockey ===
- Men's FIH Pro League (except Brunei, Malaysia, and Singapore)
- Women's FIH Pro League (except Brunei, Malaysia, and Singapore)

=== Golf ===
- The Masters Tournament
- U.S. Open Championship
- The Open Championship
- PGA Championship
- ANA Inspiration
- United States Women's Open Championship (golf)
- Women's PGA Championship
- Ricoh Women's British Open
- The Evian Championship

=== Kickboxing ===
- Kunlun Fight

=== Mixed martial arts ===
- Ultimate Fighting Championship (The remainder of the 2021 championship was aired on Mola along with other broadcasters, including antv and tvOne in Indonesia)

=== Motorsports ===
- Formula One (The remainder of the 2021 through 2022 championships were aired on other broadcasters, including Champions TV/O Channel/Moji in Indonesia, Astro SuperSport in Malaysia, and StarHub TV/Singtel TV in Singapore)
- FIA Formula 2 Championship
- FIA Formula 3 Championship
- MotoGP (The remainder of the 2021 championships were aired on SPOTV along with other broadcasters, including Trans7 in Indonesia)
- Moto2
- Moto3
- MotoE
- IndyCar Series (general broadcast on CANAL+ Vietnam)
- Superbike World Championship
- WeatherTech SportsCar Championship
- Extreme E
- FIM Motocross World Championship
- Supercars Championship
- Australian Superbike Championship
- Australian Motocross Championship
- World Touring Car Cup (highlights only)
- FIA World Endurance Championship (highlights only)
- MotoAmerica (2020–2021)

=== Rugby ===
==== Union ====
- Global Rapid Rugby

==== League ====
- National Rugby League (only for Brunei, Malaysia, and Singapore)

=== Tennis ===
- Australian Open (Broadcast rights moved to other broadcasters)
- French Open (Broadcast rights moved to other broadcasters)
- Wimbledon (Broadcast rights moved to other broadcasters)
- U.S. Open (Broadcast rights moved to other broadcasters)
- ATP Cup
- Fed Cup (final only)
- Laver Cup

=== News ===
- SportsCenter Asia
- ESPN FC

=== Other ===
- The G.O.A.T. (only for the Philippines)
- Full Throttle (only for the Philippines)
- 76 Rider (only for Indonesia)
- Special Force 2 Pro League
- Fox Sports Live (pre/post-match/game/race shows)
- 2 Wheels
- Chequered Flag
- The John Dykes Show
- Sport Confidential
- International Motorsports News
- Gillette World of Sports
- Football Asia

== Personalities ==
- John Dykes
- Colette Wong
- Paula Malai Ali
- Yvette King
- Jason de la Peña
- Steve Dawson
- Ben Ibrahim
- Edward Russell
- Alex Yoong
- Matteo Guerinoni
- Matthew Marsh
- Jazeman Jaafar
- Marlon Stöckinger

== See also ==
- Fox Sports (United States)
- Star Sports (Indian TV network)
