= STL Premier =

Malaysian professional sports league

- Sport: Sepak takraw
- Founded: 15 June 2016; 10 years ago
- No. of teams: 12 (2025)
- Country: Malaysia
- Most recent champion: Kuala Lumpur Thunder (2nd title) (2024)
- Most titles: Penang Black Panthers (3 titles)
- Level on pyramid: 1
- Relegation to: STL Division 1
- 2025 STL Premier

The STL Premier or Sepak Takraw League Premier, is the top level of the Sepak Takraw League, the Malaysian men's professional league for sepak takraw, a sport native to Southeast Asia. Contested by 10 clubs, it operates on a system of promotion and relegation with the Sepak Takraw League. Originally founded in 2014 as a single league season, the league system underwent another major revamp by introducing a promotion and relegation system after 2015 season. The new format was well-received, with the viewership of STL hitting a new record of 5.6 million viewers in the 2016 season, improving from 4.8 million viewers a year earlier. All competitions under the league use the official International Sepaktakraw Federation (ISTAF) rules and regulation.

== History ==
=== Origins ===
Malaysian sepak takraw was on the decline due to a talent pool shortage in the 2010s, with only 29 players available for national team selection at one point. A professional sepak takraw league was mooted in 2013 after Astro and UFA Sports Asia launched Singapore-based Asia Sports Ventures to undertake the development and global commercialisation of sepak takraw. Numerous discussions were held involving stakeholders to form a league similar to the Takraw Thailand League (TTL), which has been running since 2002. STL was officially launched by then Malaysian Minister of Youth and Sports Khairy Jamaluddin and STAM president Ahmad Ismail in Putrajaya on 7 November 2014.

=== Foundation year ===
In its first season, 128 teams from seven zones in Peninsular Malaysia such as Perak participated in preliminary rounds to qualify for the main competition. The best 16 teams were drawn into four groups, with the top two teams of each group progressing to the knockout stage. Hanelang A were the inaugural STL champions after beating PDRM D in the Grand Final on 18 January 2015 and took home a grand prize of RM20,000.

=== Professional era ===
The competition immediately entered its professional era the following season as teams were consolidated and narrowed down to eight teams. After the 2015 season, in which ATM became its first professional-era champions, it underwent another major revamp by introducing a promotion and relegation system. The new format was well-received, with the viewership of STL hitting a new record of 5.6 million viewers in the 2016 season, improving from 4.8 million viewers a year earlier. STL Champions Cup was created the following year to promote the league outside Malaysia.

In 2018, STL played a huge role in helping Malaysia win a gold medal in sepak takraw at the Asian Games for the first time in 24 years, as the five players involved were from the league: Farhan Adam, Zulkifli Abdul Razak, Syahir Rosdi, Azlan Alias and Norhafizi Abdul Razak.

In 2019, the league was officially broadcast outside of Malaysia for the first time when Indonesian broadcaster TVRI covered STL Champions Cup.

=== Effects of the COVID-19 pandemic ===
Due to the 2020 movement control order, the league was affected and three teams based in East Malaysia, namely Sabah Mountaineers, Sarawak Hunter and Labuan Drillers, did not participate in the 2020 season. Plans to hold the league around the country were also shelved with all STL Premier and STL Division 1 matches taking place at Titiwangsa Stadium, Kuala Lumpur, with no crowd in attendance. The season began in September 2020 but was halted indefinitely a month later, first due to players and team officials coming into close contact with a person tested positive for COVID-19 and then due to a new movement control order imposed in Selangor, Kuala Lumpur and Putrajaya. The season resumed again in December and concluded with the Kuala Lumpur Thunder winning their maiden STL Premier title. The Kuala Lumpur side then became only the second team to do a double by winning the STL Champions Cup.

== Competition format ==
=== Regular season ===
There are currently 10 clubs in STL Premier. During the course of a season, the clubs play each other twice (a double round-robin system) for 18 games. The teams receive two points for a win and zero points for a loss. Teams are ranked by total points, then set difference and then point difference. As of the 2020 season, the top six teams qualify for STL Champions Cup. The two lowest placed teams are relegated to STL Division 1, and the top two teams from STL Division 1 are promoted in their place.

== Clubs ==
=== Champions ===
==== STL (Amateur Era) ====
Season	Champions	Runners-up
2014	Hanelang A	PDRM D

==== STL Premier ====
Season	Champions	Runners-up
2015	ATM Guardians	Penang Black Panthers
2016	Penang Black Panthers	Kuala Lumpur Thunder
2017	Penang Black Panthers	Kuala Lumpur Thunder
2018	Penang Black Panthers	ATM Guardians
2019	Perak Bison	ATM Guardians
2020	Kuala Lumpur Thunder	ATM Guardians
2021/22	ATM Guardians	Kuala Lumpur Thunder
2023	Perak Bison	Kuala Lumpur Thunder
2024	Kuala Lumpur Thunder	Perak Bison

Grand Prix Format 2024 onwards

GP	Selangor	Terengganu	Perak	Penang	Johor	Kuala Lumpur	Negeri Sembilan
2024; Details	KL Thunder	KL Thunder	KL Thunder	KL Thunder	KL Thunder	-	-
2025; Details		Melaka Titans	Perak Bison			Melaka Titans	Negeri Sembilan Antlers

=== 2023 season ===
Ten clubs compete in the 2023 season.

2023 Club	2021/22 Position	First season in STL Premier	Seasons in STL Premier	Top division titles	Best result in STL Premier
ATM Guardians	1st	2015	7	2	Champions (2015, 2021/22)
Johor Tigris	6th	2015	7	-	3rd (2019, 2020)
Kuala Lumpur Thunder	2nd	2015	7	1	Champions (2020)
Penang Black Panthers	4th	2015	7	3	Champions (2016, 2017, 2018)
Sabah Mountaineers	-	2016	3	-	10th (2019)
Perak Bison	8th	2017	5	2	Champions (2019, 2023)
Negeri Sembilan Antlers	3rd	2019	3	-	3rd (2021/22)
Bomba Fighters	9th	2021/2022	2	-	9th (2021/22)
KPT-Masum Knights	2nd (D1)	2023	1	-	-
Melaka Titans	1st (D1)	2023	1	-	-

*As of the 2023 season

== Sponsorship ==
Season	Official Sponsor/Partner
2015	
2016	Budi Group, Dashing, Ekspres Perdana, iBookCourt, Marathon, Minamax Construction, National Education Savings Scheme, Sinar, Sports Arena Sentosa, Spritzer, Subang Jaya City Council
2017	Cactus, FBT, Innate Energy, iSooka, Sinar
2018	Era, FBT, Gegar, Sinar, Twitter
2019	Gegar, Gem In Mall, Jazz Hotel, Li-Ning, M Roof Hotel & Residences, Nokia, Sinar Harian, Syok, Zayan
2020	Idemitsu, Li-Ning, Sinar Harian
2021/ 2022 2023	Kedai Emas Anuar (title sponsor); Utusan Malaysia, BP Healthcare, Li-Ning, Idemitsu

== Media coverage ==
Broadcaster	Year	Note
Astro Arena (Malaysia)	2014-current	
ELEVENSPORTS.com	2022	Available in Singapore, Thailand, Indonesia, Philippines and Hong Kong.
