= Sepak Takraw League =

Malaysian professional sports league

- Sport: Sepak takraw
- Founded: 7 November 2014; 12 years ago
- No. of teams: 22 (2024)
- Country: Malaysia
- Most recent champion: Perak Bison (2025)
- Most titles: Penang Black Panthers & Perak Bison (3)

Notes
- updated as of the 2026 season

The Sepak Takraw League, often referred as STL, is a Malaysian men's professional league for sepak takraw, a sport native to Southeast Asia. The competition was established in 2014 by the Sepak Takraw Association of Malaysia (PSM) and Astro Group's subsidiary, Asia Sports Ventures, to develop the sport and groom players for the Malaysia men's national team. Since 2016, it operates on a system of promotion and relegation between a top division called STL Premier and a second division called STL Division 1. A cup competition called STL Champions Cup was introduced in 2017, featuring the top teams from STL Premier and STL Division 1 as well as invitational sides from around Asia. All competitions under the league use the official International Sepaktakraw Federation (ISTAF) rules and regulation.

Since 2018, it has been administered by PSM and Astro Group under a different subsidiary, Astro Arena.

== History ==
=== Origins ===
Malaysian sepak takraw was on the decline due to a talent pool shortage in the 2010s, with only 29 players available for national team selection at one point. A professional sepak takraw league was mooted in 2013 after Astro and UFA Sports Asia launched Singapore-based Asia Sports Ventures to undertake the development and global commercialisation of sepak takraw. Numerous discussions were held involving stakeholders to form a league similar to the Takraw Thailand League (TTL), which has been running since 2002. STL was officially launched by then Malaysian Minister of Youth and Sports Khairy Jamaluddin and PSM president Ahmad Ismail in Putrajaya on 7 November 2014.

=== Foundation year ===
In its first season, 128 teams participated to qualify for the main competition. The best 16 teams were drawn into four groups, with the top two teams of each group progressing to the knockout stage. Hanelang A were the inaugural STL champions after beating PDRM D in the Grand Final on 18 January 2015, and took home a grand prize of RM20,000.

=== Professional era ===
The competition entered its professional era the following season as teams were consolidated and the league was narrowed down to eight teams. The league underwent another major revamp by introducing promotion and relegation system. The new format was well-received, with the viewership of STL hitting a new record of 5.6 million viewers in the 2016 season, improving from 4.8 million viewers a year earlier. STL Champions Cup was created the following year to promote the league outside Malaysia.

In 2018, STL played a huge role in helping Malaysia win a gold medal in sepak takraw at the Asian Games for the first time in 24 years. as the five players involved were from the league - Farhan Adam, Zulkifli Abdul Razak, Syahir Rosdi, Azlan Alias and Norhafizi Abdul Razak. In 2019, the league was officially broadcast outside of Malaysia for the first time, when Indonesian broadcaster TVRI covered STL Champions Cup.

=== Effects of the COVID-19 pandemic ===
Due to the 2020 movement control order, the league was affected and three teams (Sabah Mountaineers, Sarawak Hunter and Labuan Driller) did not participate. Plans to hold the league around the country were also shelved with all STL Premier and Division 1 matches taking place at Titiwangsa Stadium, with no crowd in attendance. The season began in September but was halted indefinitely a month later. The season resumed again in December and concluded with Kuala Lumpur Thunder winning their maiden STL Premier title. The Kuala Lumpur side became only the second team to do a double by lifting the STL Champions Cup.

=== 10 year anniversary ===
In 2024, the Grand Prix format was implemented in STL Premier. 10 teams from the previous season plus 2 promoted teams from STL Division 1 competed in a league and championship format in each GP accumulating points in an overall table that determined the winner of STL Premier 2024. KL Thunder created history by sweeping all 5 GP wins to emerge as the overall champion, suffering only 2 losses across a total of 25 games.

== Competition format ==
=== Regular season ===
There are currently 12 clubs in STL Premier. During the course of a season, the clubs play each other twice (a double round-robin system) for 18 games. The teams receive two points for a win and zero points for a loss. Teams are ranked by total points, then set difference and then point difference. As of the 2020 season, the top six teams qualify for STL Champions Cup. The two lowest placed teams are relegated to STL Division 1, and the top two teams from STL Division 1 are promoted in their place.

The GP format was maintained in 2025 with an additional venue in Arena 9, Nilai, Negeri Sembilan. However, qualification from the group stage of each GP was updated, with the group winners progressing to the semi finals, while runners-up played in a 5th to 8th classification round. Melaka Titans created history by emerging as champion of the first GP in 2025, held in Terengganu.

For STL Division 1, there are currently 10 clubs, playing each other once. Starting with the 2020 season, teams are divided into two groups, with the top two of each group progress to a promotion playoff stage. Teams that reach the promotion playoff final are promoted to STL Premier and qualify for STL Champions Cup.

=== STL Champions Cup ===
Since its inception in 2017, the top teams from STL Premier and STL Division 1, as well as several foreign teams, compete in the post-season tournament. 2024 saw the return of foreign teams to the competition, pitted against the top 4 teams from STL Premier. The 8 teams were divided into 2 groups, with the top 2 moving on to the semi finals. In the 2025 season, the number of teams was expanded to the top 5 STL Premier teams and 5 foreign teams.

=== Piala Sumbangsih ===
For the 2026/27 season, the Piala Sumbangsih was brought back as the season opener, pitting the STL Premier champs Perak Bison against the Champions Cup winners Negeri Sembilan Antlers. Prior to this, the Piala Sumbangsih was held in 2019 and the 2021/22 seasons. Penang Black Panthers beat Negeri Sembilan Antlers to emerging as inaugural winners, while KL Thunder beat Bomba Fighters in the second edition. In 2026, Negeri Sembilan Antlers added one more silverware to their collection after defeating Perak.

== Sponsorship ==
The logo of the league featuring its first title sponsor, Emas Anuar.

| Season | Title sponsor | Official sponsors/partners |
|---|---|---|
| 2016 | | Budi Group, Dashing, Ekspres Perdana, iBookCourt, Marathon, Minamax Construction, National Education Savings Scheme, Sinar, Sports Arena Sentosa, Spritzer, Subang Jaya City Council |
| 2017 | | Cactus, FBT, Innate Energy, iSooka, Sinar |
| 2018 | | Era, FBT, Gegar, Sinar FM, Twitter |
| 2019 | | Gegar, Gem In Mall, Jazz Hotel, Li-Ning, M Roof Hotel & Residences, Nokia, Sinar Harian, Syok, Zayan |
| 2020 | | Idemitsu, Li-Ning, Sinar Harian |
| 2021/ 2022 | Kedai Emas Anuar | Utusan Malaysia, BP Healthcare, Li-Ning, Idemitsu, Zayan, Sinar FM |
| 2022/ 2023 | Kedai Emas Anuar | Li-Ning, Idemitsu, Zayan, Sinar FM |
| 2024 | Kedai Emas Anuar | Li-Ning, Flash Sukan, Zayan, Sinar FM, Gegar |
| 2025 | CelcomDigi | Vida, Gajahmas, FBT-UFL, POS Malaysia, First Pride, Tickethotline, Zayan, Sinar FM, Gegar |
| 2026/27 | CelcomDigi | Vida, Gajahmas, Kotaqu, MS Events, ShekinahPR, Tickethotline |

== Champions ==
=== STL (amateur era) ===
| Season | Champions | Runners-up |
|---|---|---|
| 2014 | Hanelang A | PDRM D |

=== STL Premier ===
| Season | Champions | Runners-up |
|---|---|---|
| 2015 | ATM Guardians | Penang Black Panthers |
| 2016 | Penang Black Panthers | Kuala Lumpur Thunder |
| 2017 | Penang Black Panthers | Kuala Lumpur Thunder |
| 2018 | Penang Black Panthers | ATM Guardians |
| 2019 | Perak Bison | ATM Guardians |
| 2020 | Kuala Lumpur Thunder | ATM Guardians |
| 2021/22 | ATM Guardians | Kuala Lumpur Thunder |
| 2022/23 | Perak Bison | Kuala Lumpur Thunder |
| 2024 | Kuala Lumpur Thunder | Perak Bison |
| 2025 | Perak Bison | Kuala Lumpur Thunder |

Grand Prix Format

| GP | Selangor | Terengganu | Perak | Penang | Johor | Kuala Lumpur | Negeri Sembilan | Melaka |
|---|---|---|---|---|---|---|---|---|
| 2024 | KL Thunder | KL Thunder | KL Thunder | KL Thunder | KL Thunder | - | - | - |
| 2025 | - | Melaka Titans | Perak Bison | Melaka Titans | Negeri Sembilan Antlers | Melaka Titans | Negeri Sembilan Antlers | - |
| 2026 | | | PDRM Defenders | Perak Bison | | Perak Bison | | Melaka Titans |

=== STL Division 1 ===
| Season | Champions | Runners-up |
|---|---|---|
| 2016 | Perak Bison | PSM Mavericks* |
| 2017 | Melaka Titans | PDRM Defenders |
| 2018 | Negeri Sembilan Antlers | Sabah Mountaineers |
| 2019 | Selangor Pistons | Pahang Mammoth |
| 2020 | Bomba Fighters | Putrajaya Cyborg |
| 2021/22 | Melaka Titans | KPT-Masum Knights |
| 2022/23 | PDRM Defenders | Terengganu Turtles |
| 2024 | Kelantan Warriors | Selangor Pistons |
| 2025 | Melaka Titans | Bomba Fighters |
| 2026/27 | Kedah Eagles | Bomba Fighters |

*Selangor Pistons were promoted instead of PSM Mavericks (then known as PSM A)

=== STL Champions Cup ===
| Season | Champions | Runners-up |
|---|---|---|
| 2017 | Penang Black Panthers | Perak Bison |
| 2018 | Penang Black Panthers | ATM Guardians |
| 2019 | Johor Tigris | Penang Black Panthers |
| 2020 | Kuala Lumpur Thunder | Penang Black Panthers |
| 2021/22 | Kuala Lumpur Thunder | Johor Tigris |
| 2022/23 | Negeri Sembilan Antlers | Perak Bison |
| 2024 | Negeri Sembilan Antlers | Kuala Lumpur Thunder |
| 2025 | Negeri Sembilan Antlers | Kuala Lumpur Thunder |

== Clubs ==
=== Current ===
| Club | Current division in 2026 | First season in STL Premier | Best result in STL Premier | STL Champions Cup appearances |
|---|---|---|---|---|
| ATM Guardians | Premier | 2015 | Champions (2015, 2021/22) | 4 (2018, 2019, 2020 2021/22) |
| Bomba Fighters | Premier | 2021 | - | 1 (2020) |
| Johor Tigris | Premier | 2015 | 3rd (2019, 2020) | 4 (2018, 2019, 2020, 2025) |
| Kedah Eagles | Premier | 2015 | 7th (2016) | - |
| Kelantan Warriors | Premier | 2015 | 4th (2015, 2017) | 4 (2017, 2018, 2019, 2020) |
| Malaysian University Knights | Division 1 | - | - | - |
| Kuala Lumpur Thunder | Premier | 2015 | Champions (2020, 2024) | 7 (2017, 2018, 2020, 2021/22,2022/23, 2024, 2025) |
| Labuan Drillers | Division 1 | - | - | - |
| Melaka Titans | Premier | 2015 | 3rd (2025) | 2 (2017, 2025) |
| Negeri Sembilan Antlers | Premier | 2019 | 4th (2020, 2025) | 5 (2018, 2019, 2020, 2024, 2025) |
| Pahang Mammoth | Division 1 | 2020 | 9th (2020) | - |
| PDRM Defenders | Premier | 2018 | 7th (2018) | 1 (2017) |
| Penang Black Panthers | Premier | 2015 | Champions (2016, 2017, 2018) | 4 (2017, 2018, 2019, 2020) |
| Penjara Enforcers | Division 1 | - | - | - |
| Perak Bison | Premier | 2017 | Champions (2019, 2023, 2025) | 5 (2017, 2018, 2019, 2024, 2025) |
| Perlis Vipers | Division 1 | - | - | - |
| PSM-SSM Mavericks | Division 1 | - | - | - |
| Putrajaya Cyborg | Division 1 | 2021 | - | 1 (2020) |
| Sabah Mountaineers | Division 1 | - | - | - |
| Sarawak Hunter | Division 1 | - | - | - |
| Selangor Pistons | Premier | 2017 | 6th (2025) | 1 (2024) |
| Terengganu Turtles | Division 1 | 2015 | 2nd (2016) | - |

*updated as of the 2026 season

=== Former ===
| Club | First season | Final season | Note |
|---|---|---|---|
| PSM Drillers | 2016 | 2019 | Did not compete in the 2018 season. |
| Labuan Drillers | 2016 | 2018 | Did not compete in the 2019 season. Pulled out of the 2020 season due to COVID-19. |

=== Name changes ===
| Club | Former name |
|---|---|
| ATM Guardians | ATM |
| Johor Tigris | Southern Tigris |
| Kedah Eagles | Northern Rangers |
| Kelantan Warriors | Gomo Warriors |
| Malaysian University Knights | KPT MASUM |
| Kuala Lumpur Thunder | City Flyers |
| Melaka Titans | Green Titans |
| Penang Black Panthers | Black Panthers |
| Perak Bison | Perak The Bos Gaurus |
| PDRM Defenders | PDRM |
| PSM Mavericks | PSM A |
| PSM Drillers | PSM B |
| PSM-SSM Mavericks | PSM Mavericks |
| Terengganu Turtles | East Coast Surfers |

=== International clubs ===
| Club | Country | Season | Best performance in STL Champions Cup |
|---|---|---|---|
| Manang City Voyagers | Thailand | 2017 | 3rd |
| Andalas Islanders | Indonesia | 2017 | Group stage |
| Korea Haechi | South Korea | 2019 | 4th |
| China Great Wall | China | 2019 | Group stage |
| Indonesia Garuda | Indonesia | 2019 | Group stage |
| Singapore Lions | Singapore | 2019 | Group stage |
| MGPC Singapore | Singapore | 2024 | Group stage |
| Garuda Sepaktakraw | Indonesia | 2024 | Group stage |
| Royal Thai Air Force Sepaktakraw Club | Thailand | 2024 | Group stage |
| STFI India Fighters | India | 2024, 2025 | Group stage |
| Ratchaburi Takraw Club | Thailand | 2025 | 4th |
| Goyang City Hall | South Korea | 2025 | Group Stage |
| Japan Sepak Takraw | Japan | 2025 | Group Stage |

== Awards ==
=== STL Premier ===
| Season | Most Valuable Player | Best Tekong | Best Striker | Best Feeder | Best Foreign Player | Best Coach | Best Manager | Best Referee | Fair Play Award |
|---|---|---|---|---|---|---|---|---|---|
| 2015 | - | Tunku Noor Azwari Tunku Ishak (ATM) | Wan Anas Muhaimi Wan Asri (Penang) | Farhan Adam (Kelantan) | - | - | - | - | - |
| 2016 | Syahir Rosdi (Penang) | Syahir Rosdi (Penang) | Afifuddin Razali (ATM) | Amirul Zazwan Amir (KL) | - | - | - | - | ATM |
| 2017 | Syahir Rosdi (Penang) | Syahir Rosdi (Penang) | Ahmad Fadzil Mustafa (Perak) | Aidil Aiman Azwawi (Kelantan) | - | Sufian Napiah (Penang) | - | - | - |
| 2018 | Azlan Alias (Penang) | Hairul Hazizi (ATM) | Azlan Alias (Penang) | Farhan Adam (Selangor) | - | Aswadi Abdullah (ATM) | DSP Zakaria (PDRM) | - | Terengganu |
| 2019 | Azlan Alias (Penang) | Ahmad Aizat Nor Azmi (KL) | Azlan Alias (Penang) | Aidil Aiman Azwawi (Kelantan) | Apirak Promanee (Kelantan) | Aswadi Abdullah (ATM) | Major Tajul Hisyam Mamat (ATM) | Ariffin Ahmad Rahim | Negeri Sembilan |
| 2020 | Amirul Zazwan Amir (KL) | Syahir Rosdi (KL) | Hafizul Hayazi Adnan (NS) | Amirul Zazwan Amir (KL) | - | Ahmad Supian Napiah (Penang) | Zambri Abdul Rahman (KL) | Dr. Che Aziz Yaacob | ATM |
| 2021/22 | Muhd Afiffudin Razali (ATM) | Meor Zulfikar (Perak) | Muhd Afiffudin Razali (ATM) | Amirul Zazwan Amir (KL) | - | Aswadi Abdullah (ATM) | Mohd Azlee Hj Ahmad Mahiudin (Penang) | Bahtiar Junaidi | Negeri Sembilan |
| 2022/23 | Muhd Zaim Razali (Penang) | Rattadech Noijareon (Johor) | Noraizat Nordin (Perak) | Syahmi Syazwan Aziz (Johor) | - | Suhairi Abd Aziz (Perak) | Zambri Abdul Rahman (KL) | Baharuddin Bahar | ATM |
| 2024 | Syahir Rosdi (KL) | - | - | - | - | Rosli Abd Rahman (KL) | Mohd Jaffrey Mohd Zainol (Perak) | Aminunajjah Mohd Yunus | - |
| 2025 | Syahir Rosdi (KL) | - | - | - | - | Mohd Dzafril Mohd Anuar (Perak) | Nor Hasimi Mohd Nor (Melaka) | Zaharuddin Zainal Abidin | - |

From 2024 onwards, individual player awards were given out after each Grand Prix and a new Fans Choice category was added:

| Season | GP | Best Tekong | Best Striker | Best Feeder | Fans Choice |
|---|---|---|---|---|---|
| 2024 | Selangor | Haziq Nizam (NS) | Azlan Alias (KL) | Amirul Zazwan (KL) | Meor Zulfikar (Perak) |
| 2024 | Terengganu | Syahmi Husin (PDRM) | Azlan Alias (KL) | Zaim Razali (Penang) | Zaim Razali (Penang) |
| 2024 | Perak | Zuhri Zin (Selangor) | Ariff Daniel (Selangor) | Amirul Zazwan (KL) | Noraizat Nordin (Perak) |
| 2024 | Penang | Haziq Nizam (NS) | Noraizat Nordin (Perak) | Amirul Zazwan (KL) | Kritsada Sunvung (Perak) |
| 2024 | Johor | Haziq Nizam (NS) | Hafizul Hayazi (NS) | Zulefendi Sumari (NS) | Noraizat Nordin (Perak) |
| 2025 | Terengganu | Syahir Rosdi (Melaka) | Azlan Alias (Melaka) | Zaim Razali (Penang) | Azlan Alias (Melaka) |
| 2025 | N Sembilan | Haziq Nizam (NS) | Shahalril Aiman (PDRM) | Farhan Adam (Johor) | Haziq Nizam (NS) |
| 2025 | K Lumpur | Syahir Rosdi (Melaka) | Hafizul Hayazi (NS) | Zaim Razali (Melaka) | Aidil Aiman (Perak) |
| 2025 | Johor | Haziq Nizam (NS) | Hafizul Hayazi (NS) | Zulefendi Sumari (NS) | Hafizul Hayazi (NS) |
| 2025 | Perak | Kritsada Sungvung (Perak) | Noraizat Nordin (Perak) | Aidil Aiman (Perak) | Aidil Aiman (Perak) |
| 2025 | Penang | Syahir Rosdi (Melaka) | Azlan Alias (Melaka) | Zaim Razali (Penang) | Kritsada Sungvung (Perak) |
| 2026 | Perak | Chutchanan Suwannarat (KL) | Shahalril Aiman (PDRM) | Kamarul Ezzad (KL) | Zuhri Zin (Johor) |
| 2026 | Penang | Pornthep Tinbangbon (Perak) | Hafizul Hayazi (NS) | Amirul Zazwan (Perak) | Hapeesorn Hnahno (Kedah) |
| 2026 | Melaka | Anuphat Chaipen (Selangor) | Nazrein Daniel (Perak) | Zaim Razali (Melaka) | Amirul Zazwan (Perak) |
| 2026 | K Lumpur | Pornthep Tinbangbon (Perak) | Madlee Anda (Kelantan) | Shahalril Aimin (PDRM) | Pornthep Tinbangbon (Perak) |

=== STL Division 1 ===
| Season | Best Tekong | Best Striker | Best Feeder | Best Coach | Best Manager | Fair Play Award |
|---|---|---|---|---|---|---|
| 2016 | Meor Ahmad (Perak) | Fadzil Mustafa (Perak) | Safarudin Abu Bakar (PSM A) | - | - | Perak |
| 2017 | Sahidan Ali (Melaka) | Hafiz Izudin Wahab (PDRM) | Adli Abu Bakar (Pahang) | Khairul Anuar Ibrahim (Melaka) | - | - |
| 2018 | Izwan Zukri (Sabah) | Khairol Zaman (NS) | Fakhrul Razi Ismail (Pahang) | Isa Sidek (NS) | Azam Yaakob (Pahang) | - |
| 2019 | Adam Aiman Zainol (Putrajaya) | Muslim Mohammad (Putrajaya) | Farhan Adam (Selangor) | Khairul Bahrin (Putrajaya) | Yusof Mohamed (Pahang) | - |
| 2020 | Irsyad Faiz Aziz (Bomba) | Fadzil Baharudin (Putrajaya) | Amir Aizad (MASUM-UPM) | Ahmad Zain (Bomba) | Ridzuan Ahmad (Melaka) | - |
| 2024 | Puraced Yodsaen (Kelantan) | Nonthanan Sombatlay (Selangor) | Adli Abu Bakar (Kelantan) | Noor Azman Abd Hamid (Selangor) | Mahizi Mahmood (Kelantan) | - |
| 2025 | Syahir Rosdi (Melaka) | Khairul Hafizi (Malaysian University) | Zaim Zamri (Bomba) | Khairul Anuar Ibrahim (Melaka) | Muhd Ismail Famin (Bomba) | |
| 2026/27 | Amar Roslan (Kedah) | Syarul Ishaqqin Md Desa (Bomba) | Zulhusni Basri (Kedah) | Ahmad Mohd Zin (Bomba) | Mohd Rani Din (Kedah) | |

=== STL Champions Cup ===
| Season | Most Valuable Player | Best Tekong | Best Striker | Best Feeder |
|---|---|---|---|---|
| 2017 | Syahir Rosdi (Penang) | Syahir Rosdi (Penang) | Fadzil Mustafa (Perak) | Farhan Adam (Penang) |
| 2018 | Syahir Rosdi (Penang) | Syahir Rosdi (Penang) | Hafizul Hayazi (NS) | Aidil Aiman (Kelantan) |
| 2019 | Noraizat Nordin (Johor) | Lim Tae-gyun (Korea) | Noraizat Nordin (Johor) | Farhan Adam (Penang) |
| 2020 | Amirul Zazwan Amir (KL) | Hairul Hazizi (ATM) | Shahalril Aiman (Penang) | Amirul Zazwan (KL) |
| 2024 | Haziq Nizam (NS) | Syahir Rosdi (KL) | Noraizat Nordin (Perak) | Zulefendi Sumari (NS) |
| 2025 | Haziq Nizam (NS) | Haziq Nizam (NS) | Hafizul Hayazi (NS) | Amirul Zazwan (KL) |

== World feed coverage ==
| Broadcaster | Year | Note |
|---|---|---|
| Astro Arena (Malaysia) | 2014-current | |
| TVRI (Indonesia) | 2019 & 2023 | STL Champions Cup only in 2019 |
| ALL SPORTS (USA) | 2021 | |
| ELEVENSPORTS.com | 2022 | Available in Singapore, Thailand, Indonesia, Philippines and Hong Kong. |
| Fiji Broadcasting Centre, Ariana Radio & Television Network (Afghanistan), Mauritius Broadcasting Corporation | 2024 | Broadcast began from Perak GP |
| SPOTV | 2026 | |
