= STL Division 1 =

Malaysian professional sports league

- Sport: Sepak takraw
- Founded: 15 June 2016; 10 years ago
- No. of teams: 10 (2023/24)
- Country: Malaysia
- Most recent champion: Terengganu Turtles (1st title) (2023)
- Level on pyramid: 2
- Promotion to: STL Premier

The STL Division 1 or Sepak Takraw League Division 1, is the second tier level of the Sepak Takraw League, the Malaysian men's professional league for sepak takraw, a sport native to Southeast Asia. Contested by 10 clubs, it operates on a system of promotion and relegation with the Sepak Takraw League. Originally founded in 2014 as a single league season, the league system underwent another major revamp by introducing a promotion and relegation system after 2015 season. The new format was well-received, with the viewership of STL hitting a new record of 5.6 million viewers in the 2016 season, improving from 4.8 million viewers a year earlier. All competitions under the league use the official International Sepaktakraw Federation (ISTAF) rules and regulation.
