= Astro SuperSport =

Malaysian sports TV channel

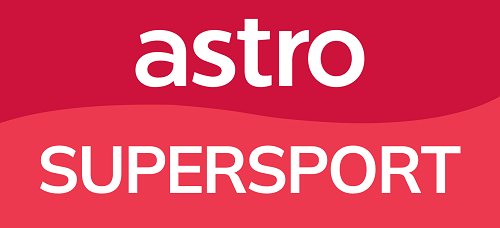
- Country: Malaysia
- Broadcast area: International
- Headquarters: Kuala Lumpur, Malaysia

Programming
- Language: English
- Picture format: 16:9 (HDTV)

Ownership
- Owner: Astro
- Sister channels: Astro Arena; Astro Arena Bola; Astro Box Office Sport; Astro Cricket

History
- Launched: 3 August 1997; 29 years ago 2000 (Astro Box Office Sport); 18 November 2009; 16 years ago (Astro SuperSport 2); 11 December 2009; 16 years ago (HD); 12 August 2010; 16 years ago (Astro SuperSport 3); 8 August 2011; 15 years ago (Astro SuperSport 2 HD); 23 April 2013; 13 years ago (Astro SuperSport 3 HD, Astro SuperSport 4); 1 September 2016; 10 years ago (Astro SuperSport 4 HD); 1 October 2021; 5 years ago (Astro SuperSport 5 HD)
- Founder: Ananda Krishnan
- Closed: 1 August 2016 (HyppTV); 30 November 2020 (SD); 15 July 2023 (Astro Supersport 5 HD); 17 October 2024 (Astro SuperSport brand)
- Replaced by: W-Sport HD (Channel 826); Astro Grandstand HD (Channel 810); Astro Premier League HD (Channel 811); Astro Premier League 2 HD (Channel 812); Astro Football HD (Channel 814); Astro Badminton HD (Channel 815); Astro Sports Plus HD (Channel 817)
- Former names: Astro Showcase/Season Pass (for Astro Box Office Sport)

Astro SuperSport is an English language in-house subscription satellite television network in Malaysia dedicated to broadcasting sports-related content 24 hours a day. Astro SuperSport 1 to 4 are available on the Astro via channels 811 to 814 (HD) to subscribers of the sports pack.

Launched in 1996 as one of Astro's original channels, Astro SuperSport offers a variety of international sporting events such as football, badminton, motorsport, rugby, volleyball, golf and WWE shows. Astro SuperSport broadcasts in HD. The network has been broadcasting studio shows of the major international competitions, including the Premier League and FIFA World Cup since 2010 and magazine shows like FourFourTwo since 2011. From 17 October 2024, the Astro SuperSport brand was discontinued and replaced with revamped Astro Sports channels.

== Channels ==
=== Former channels ===
==== eGG Network ====
eGG (every Good Game) is the first 24/7 gaming entertainment network in Southeast Asia. Launched on 13 August 2015 as the Astro SuperSport Plus, previously only available in Malaysia as the special sister channel of Astro SuperSport. Due to high enthusiasm of eSports fans, from 7 June 2016 the channel changed its name and was launched officially as eGG. After the eGG Network launched in 2016, the channel is also available for the viewers in Australia, Indonesia, Myanmar, Philippines, Singapore, and Thailand. This channel focuses on e-sports, and broadcasts electronic games tournaments live around the world. The first tournament broadcast through this channel was The International 2015. The channel ceased broadcast on 23 January 2023, with its programming moved to Astro Arena and Astro Arena 2.

==== Astro SuperSport Plus ====
Astro SuperSport Plus was the extra channel of Astro SuperSport. It was broadcast on Astro in HD. The channel was ceased on 17 October 2024; its channel slot was taken by Astro Sports Plus.

==== Astro SuperSport 2 ====
Astro SuperSport 2 was the second channel of Astro SuperSport. Launched on 18 November 2009, it is broadcast on Astro via Channel 812. Sporting events aired on the network include the BWF Super Series, the ATP World Tour Finals, the J-League, the Bundesliga, the Ligue 1 as well as American competitions like NFL and NHL and Mexican competitions like Copa MX. The channel was ceased on 17 October 2024; its channel slot was taken by Astro Premier League 2.

==== Astro SuperSport 3 ====
Astro SuperSport 3 was the third channel of Astro SuperSport. Launched on 12 August 2010, it was broadcast on Astro via Channel 813. It simulcasted games such as Premier League, K League 1, ASEAN Championship, and CONCACAF Gold Cup. The channel was ceased on 17 October 2024; its channel slot was taken by Astro Grandstand.

==== Astro SuperSport 4 ====
Astro SuperSport 4 was the fourth channel of Astro SuperSport. Launched on 23 April 2013, it was broadcast on Astro via Channel 814. It simulcasted games such as FA Cup, NBA Games, WNBA, Badminton Premier, Superseries and Grand Prix Gold, WTA Tour, WWE Raw, WWE SmackDown, WWE NXT, WWE This Week and WWE Bottomline. The channel was ceased on 17 October 2024; its channel slot was taken by Astro Football.

==== Astro SuperSport 5 ====
Astro SuperSport 5 was the fifth channel of Astro SuperSport. Launched on 1 October 2021, it was broadcast on Astro via channel 815. It aired world-class sporting events that were on FOX Sports such as UFC, Bundesliga, Formula 1, BWF, AFC and ATP. Astro SuperSport 5 also aired some SPOTV 2 programming. The channel was ceased on 15 July 2023; its channel slot was taken by W-Sport.

== Coverage ==
=== Current ===
==== Football ====
- AFC
- Premier League

==== Badminton ====
- BWF

==== Motorsport ====
- MotoGP

=== Former ===
==== Futsal and Beach Soccer ====
- FIFA (until 2022)
  - National teams
    - Men's :
      - FIFA World Cup
      - FIFA U-20 World Cup
      - FIFA Beach Soccer World Cup
      - FIFA Futsal World Cup
  - FIFA Confederations Cup (until 2017, now the tournament abolished)
  - FIFA Club World Cup (until 2021)
  - FIFA Arab Cup
    - Women's :
      - FIFA Women's World Cup (until 2019)
      - FIFA U-20 Women's World Cup
      - FIFA U-17 Women's World Cup
- UEFA
  - National teams
    - UEFA European Under-21 Championship (until 2017)
    - UEFA Futsal Championship (until 2016)
  - UEFA European Championship (until 2021)
  - Clubs (until 2018–19)
    - UEFA Champions League
    - UEFA Europa League
    - UEFA Super Cup (until 2017)
- EFL (until 2015–16, except for EFL Cup until 2018–19)
  - Cup
  - Championship
  - League One
  - EFL League Two
- La Liga
- International Champions Cup (until 2019)
- RFEF (until 2016 Supercopa)
  - Copa del Rey
  - Supercopa
- Lega Serie A (until 2012–13, except for Serie A until 2014–15)
  - Serie A
  - Coppa Italia
  - Supercoppa Italiana
- DFL
  - Bundesliga (until 2022–23)
  - Super Cup
- Primeira Liga
- Saudi Professional League (until 2023)

==== Badminton ====
- Badminton Asia (until 2025)

==== Motorsport ====
- Formula One (until 2022)
- Formula 2 (until 2022)
- Formula 3 (until 2022)
- W Series (until 2022)

== See also ==
- Astro
- Astro Arena
- Astro UHD
- Astro SuperSport UHD
- Astro Sports UHD
