= SportsCenter Asia =

Sports newscast on Fox Sports in Hong Kong

- Also known as: SportCenter Asia (ESPN Star Sports, until 25 January 2013); Fox Sports Central (until 31 December 2020)
- Country of origin: Singapore

Production
- Running time: 30 min

Original release
- Network: Fox Sports
- Release: 27 May 2002 – 30 September 2021

SportsCenter Asia (formerly Fox Sports Central) was the flagship sports newscast broadcast on Fox Sports in Hong Kong and Southeast Asia. It was cancelled in 2021 consistent with the shutdown of the Fox Sports channels.

As ESPN Star Sports SportsCenter, there have been Malaysian and Indian editions of the programme.

== History ==
A flagship sports newscast on ESPN, SportsCenter Asia was based on the American counterpart, broadcast every weeknight at 7:30 p.m. for 30 minutes, with repeats at 10 p.m. and 12:30 a.m. Hong Kong-time in Southeast Asia, (except in the Philippines where it was broadcast at 9:00 p.m. and 11:30 p.m on delay) and at 8:30 p.m. and 10.30 p.m. across India, SportsCenter drew on the worldwide resources of ESPN. SportsCenter Asia covered mostly football, but it also showed highlights of the NBA, tennis, baseball, Formula One, and golf.

Jason Dasey spearheaded the official launch of SportsCenter Asia on 27 May 2002. The 2003 Asian Television Awards recognized it as the region's number one show of its kind by winning the 'Best Sports Program' category, and the 2005 Asian Television Awards commended it for 'Best News Program.' Other past anchors of the program include Uday Joshi, Bethan Evans, Cheryl Liew, David Basheer, and Arnold Gay. Colette Wong, a former CNBC Asia correspondent, joined as a co-anchor in March 2004, while Steve Dawson joined as an assistant producer in late 2004. Dez Corkhill was the original executive producer and sometimes appeared on the show as a football pundit. ESPN International football commentator Dave Roberts returned to Singapore in late 2011 to take over as Senior Executive Producer for SportsCenter and other news and production programs before leaving in early 2015.

Following News Corporation's take over of ESPN Star Sports (which jointly operated ESPN and Star Sports in the region) in 2012, ESPN aired the last edition of first incarnation of SportsCenter Asia on 25 January 2013, and returned with the first edition as Fox Sports Central on 28 January, the day ESPN was relaunched as Fox Sports. Fox Sports in Taiwan used to produce a local edition in Mandarin Chinese from the studios in Taipei.

On 18 September 2020, it was reported that programme would end after Disney announced that it would shut down Fox Sports operations in Taiwan at end of 2020. It was later revealed that operations in Taiwan would end on 1 January 2021 following years on losing money in the region.

The revamped version and second incarnation of SportsCenter Asia, launched on 26 January 2021, broadcast every day on Disney's Fox Sports Asia networks until September 30, 2021.

== Editions ==
=== Taiwan ===
The Taiwanese edition of Fox Sports Central (Chinese: 世界體育中心; lit. 'World Sports Centre'; a title kept from SportsCenter days) focused on local sports news and events in Taiwan, and the updates of athletes from Taiwan. Also, the program presented daily highlights of games which Fox Sports Taiwan had broadcasting rights.

=== Malaysia ===
A Malaysian version of SportsCenter was launched on 30 April 2007. Initially presented in English, SportsCenter Malaysia aired immediately before SportsCenter Asia, from 7pm local time. It promised to focus more on local sports in Malaysia but instead repeated most of the same content seen on SportsCenter Asia with only a brief domestic sports section to keep costs down. For a short time, SportsCenter Malaysia used to be featured on all Southeast Asian versions of ESPN, before being limited to only be shown on ESPN in Malaysia.

SportsCenter Malaysia had a Bahasa Malaysia version, which also repeated much of the same content shown on SportsCenter Asia. The Bahasa Malaysia program began on 30 November 2009 ahead of the launch of a Bahasa Malaysia competitor, Astro Arena, in March 2010. Former SportsCenter personalities Rashid Salleh and Edleen Ismail soon departed from ESPN to join Astro, along with many technical and production staff. On 9 December 2010, the Malaysia office was informed that the operation would be soon closing down because of a lack of funding. Senior managers Huw Bevan and Sharon Van Zwieten, visiting from Singapore, read off a prepared script to dismiss each staff member, one-by-one. The final broadcast was eight days later on 17 December 2010.

=== India ===
Originally a Hindi-language show, Sportscenter India first aired in English on 6 October 2003. It switched back to Hindi on 18 July 2005, before being relaunched in English on 28 April 2007.

Sportscenter India featured local Indian sporting news, such as the results of cricket matches and local football (I-League). Sportscenter India also covered league matches from European football and also some new from NBA. Other sports like Auto Racing, Multi-sporting events and all where India participated were covered in this news. Much of the content from SportsCenter Asia was also repeated in SportsCenter India. The Indian edition was discontinued.

== See also ==
- SportsCenter Philippines
