= EGG Network =

Malaysian esports TV channel

eGG Network
- Country: Malaysia
- Broadcast area: Malaysia; Southeast Asia
- Headquarters: Kuala Lumpur, Malaysia

Programming
- Languages: English, Malay
- Picture format: 1080i HDTV

Ownership
- Owner: Astro, Measat Broadcast Network Systems (Rocketfuel Entertainment Sdn Bhd.)
- Sister channels: Astro Arena; Astro Arena 2 Astro SuperSport; Astro Cricket

History
- Launched: 13 August 2015 as Astro SuperSport Plus; 7 June 2016 as Every Good Game
- Closed: 30 June 2018 (digital Free TV via BEAM TV in Philippines) 1 April 2022 (in Brunei) 31 December 2022 (in Indonesia, Philippines (pay TV), Singapore and Australia); 23 January 2023; 3 years ago (in Malaysia)
- Replaced by: Astro Arena; Astro Arena 2

eGG Network (formerly known as Every Good Game) was a Malaysian pay television channel that was launched on 7 June 2016. It was a joint venture of Rocketfuel Entertainment Sdn Bhd. This channel focused on esports and broadcast electronic gaming tournaments live around the world. Its first tournament broadcast was the International Dota 2 Championships 2015.

This channel ceased transmission on 23 January 2023, with some of local and international esports moved to Astro Arena and Astro Arena 2 in Bahasa Malaysia.

== Final programming ==
=== Tournaments ===
- Counter-Strike: Global Offensive
  - ELeague
  - PGL Krakòw Major 2017 Asian Minor
  - PGL Krakòw Major 2017 CIS Minor
  - PGL Krakòw Major 2017 Americas Minor
  - PGL Krakòw Major 2017 European Minor
  - PGL Krakòw Major 2017
  - PGL CS:GO Major 2021
- FIFA
  - FIFA Interactive World Cup
- Dota 2
  - Boston Major
  - The International
  - Frankfurt Major
  - Shanghai Major
  - Manila Major
  - Dota 2 Asia Championships
  - Kiev Major
  - ESL One Genting 2018
  - NESO Galaxy Battles
- League of Legends
  - World Championship
  - League of Legends Champions Korea
  - Garena Premier League
  - Wild Rift SEA Cup
- Hearthstone
  - World Championship
- Heroes of the Storm
  - World Championship
- Street Fighter V
  - ELEAGUE Street Fighter V Invitational
- Mobile Legends: Bang Bang
  - MLBB Southeast Asia Cup
  - MLBB M2 World Championship
  - MPL MY/SG Season 8
  - MLBB All-Stars
  - M4 World Championship 2022
  - MPL MY Season 10
- PUBG Mobile
  - PUBG Mobile World League East (PMWL 2020)
  - PUBG Mobile Global Championship (PMGC 2020)
  - PUBG Telur Mata Cup 2021
  - PMPL League 2021
  - PMPL Fall MY/SG/PH 2022

=== Original production ===
- 360
- eGG Scramble
- Generasi Gamerz
- Jalur 14
- 360: Stay Home
- Arena eSport
- Dari Hati 2022
- Dongibab
- Gemilang Bersama eGG (Merdeka National Day Special 2022)
