= Astro Arena (TV channel) =

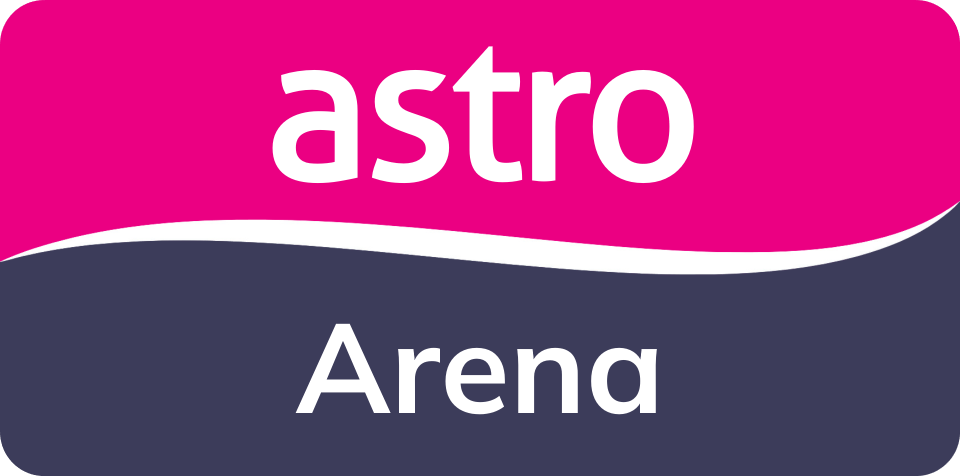
- Logo used since October 2024
- Country: Malaysia
- Headquarters: All Asia Broadcast Centre (AABC), Technology Park Malaysia, Bukit Jalil, 57000 Kuala Lumpur

Programming
- Languages: Malay; English
- Picture format: 1080i HDTV

Ownership
- Owner: Astro Malaysia Holdings
- Parent: Measat Broadcast Network Systems Sdn. Bhd. (Astro)
- Sister channels: Astro Stadium; Astro Arena Bola; Astro Sports UHD; Astro Grandstand; Astro Premier League; Astro Football; Astro Badminton; Astro Sports Plus; Astro Tennis; Astro Golf

History
- Launched: 26 March 2010; 16 years ago (SD); 1 September 2016; 9 years ago (HD); 18 August 2018; 8 years ago (Astro Arena Radio); 1 October 2021; 4 years ago (Astro Arena 2) (HD)
- Founder: Ananda Krishnan
- Replaced: eGG Network
- Closed: 12 April 2021; 5 years ago (SD) (Astro only); 1 October 2021; 4 years ago (Astro Arena Radio); 17 October 2024; 22 months ago (SD) (NJOI only)

Links
- Website: stadiumastro.com

Availability

Streaming media
- Astro: Astro GO / On Demand / Sooka

Astro Arena (stylized in all-caps as Astro ARENA until October 2024) is a Malaysian Malay-language sports television network owned and operated by the satellite television provider Astro. Launched on March 26, 2010, it is the first 24-hour Malay-language sports channel in Malaysia.

== History ==
The establishment of the channel was a collaborative initiative among Astro, the Olympic Council of Malaysia, and the former Malaysian Minister of Youth and Sports, YB Dato' Sri Ahmad Shabery Cheek, aimed at promoting and developing domestic sports.

During its early years of operation, Astro Arena broadcast primarily in standard definition. Selected live events and high-profile tournaments were simulcast in high definition (HD) through temporary programming blocks on sister networks, including Astro SuperSport HD, Mustika HD, and Maya HD. The network was later assigned a permanent HD feed on channel 801. It is distributed through Astro's entry-level package (formerly the Family Pack, later rebranded as the Astro One: Entertainment Pack) as well as the NJOI prepaid platform.

On January 23, 2023, following the restructuring and closure of Astro's dedicated e-sports network, eGG Network, all local electronic sports content and in-house studio productions were integrated into the programming schedules of Astro Arena and its secondary feed, Astro Arena 2 (channel 802).

On October 17, 2024, the channel underwent its first major visual rebranding. As part of a network-wide consolidation of Astro's sports portfolio, the network retired its original 2010 visual assets and all-caps stylization in favor of a unified corporate identity designed by Bonsey Design.

== Programming ==
Astro Arena's programming is organized around live domestic sports coverage, a daily sports news rotation, sports magazines, and interactive viewer talk shows. The channel broadcasts approximately 700 hours of live local sports annually, supplemented by 2,000 hours of event replays.

In addition to domestic leagues, the network provides up to 56 hours of weekly coverage dedicated to international sporting events featuring Malaysian athletes, alongside global sports properties tailored for the local audience. Key programs include coverage of the Malaysia Cup, Malaysia Super League, and regional multi-sport events such as the Southeast Asian Games.

== Channels ==
=== Astro Arena 2 ===
Astro Arena 2 was a Malaysian high-definition sports network operated by Astro, broadcasting on channel 802. Launched on October 1, 2021, to assume former programming blocks, the channel specialized in localized coverage of international sporting events, sports news updates, and regional e-sports tournaments. The specialized secondary wordmark was retired on August 13, 2026, when the channel was fully absorbed and rebranded under the centralized Stadium Astro corporate banner.

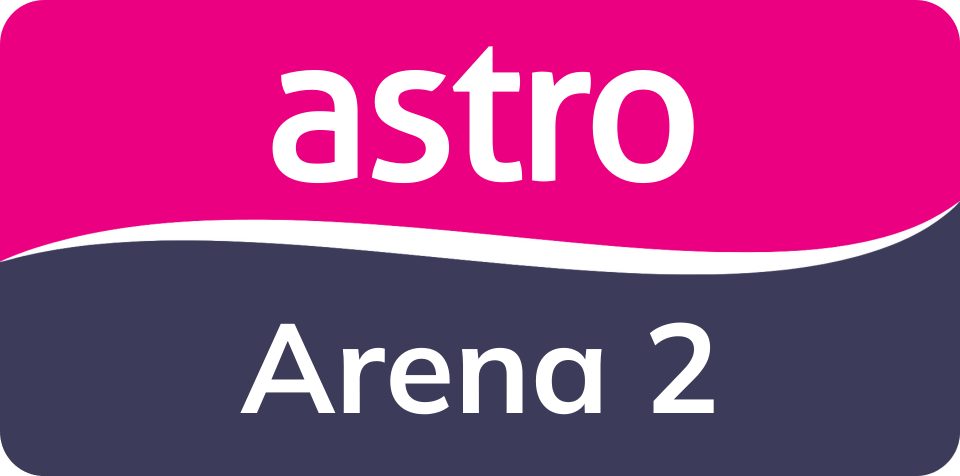

=== Astro Arena Bola ===
Launched on February 24, 2023, Astro Arena Bola was introduced as the first official sister channel to the primary Astro Arena network. Broadcasting on channel 803 in high-definition format, the network was established as a dedicated 24-hour broadcast feed explicitly tracking Malaysian football, including live tournaments and local league coverage. The expansion marked the first major variation of the Astro Arena visual identity system to feature a dedicated sub-genre suffix.

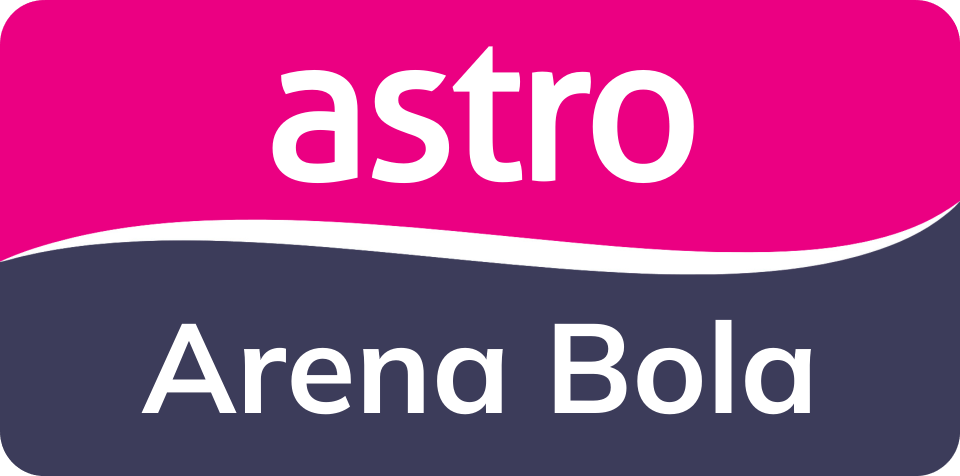

=== Astro Arena Bola 2 ===
Launched on February 24, 2023, Astro Arena Bola 2 was introduced as the second sister channel to the primary Astro Arena network. Broadcasting concurrently with its sister feed on channel 804 in high-definition format, the channel operates as a dedicated 24-hour broadcast network focusing entirely on Malaysian football coverage. This expansion expanded the Astro Arena visual identity system by combining both a genre sub-brand suffix and a numerical modifier.

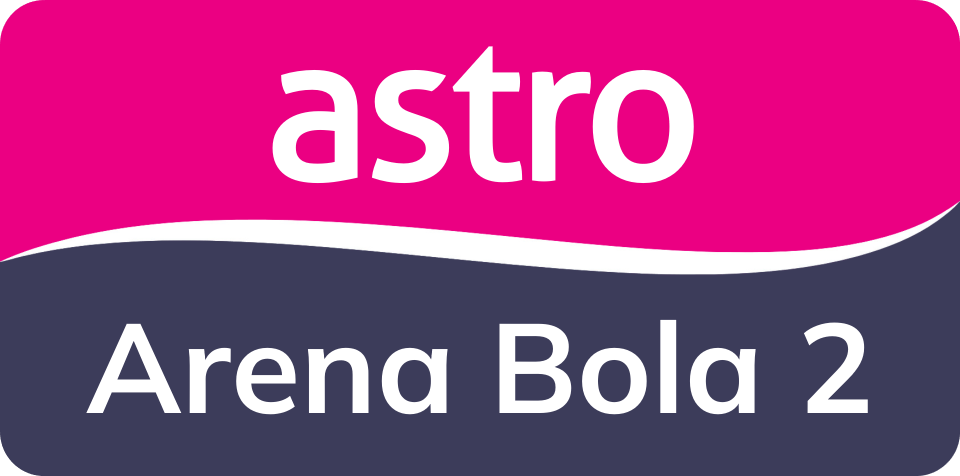

== Broadcasting rights ==
=== Basketball ===
- National Basketball Association

=== Football/futsal ===
  - National teams
    - Men's:
  - International friendlies
- FAM
  - Malaysia national football team
  - Malaysia national under-23 football team
  - Malaysia women's national football team
  - Malaysia FA Cup
  - Malaysia Premier Futsal League
- MFL
  - Malaysia Super League
  - Malaysia A1 Semi-Pro League
  - Malaysia A2 Amateur League
  - Malaysian Charity Shield
  - Malaysia Cup
  - MFL Challenge Cup
  - MFL Cup
  - Malaysia Premier Futsal League (Women)
- AFF
  - ASEAN Club Championship
  - ASEAN Women's Championship
- AFC
  - AFC Asian Cup
  - AFC Champions League Elite
  - AFC Champions League Two
  - AFC U-17 Asian Cup
  - AFC U-23 Asian Cup
- King's Cup
- Merdeka Tournament

=== Badminton ===
- BWF
  - BWF World Tour
  - World Championships
    - Teams
      - Thomas Cup (men's championship)
      - Uber Cup (women's championship)
      - Sudirman Cup (mixed team championship)
    - Individuals
- Badminton Asia Championships (national teams (men's, women's, and mixed) and Individuals)
- Malaysia Purple League

=== Hockey ===
- FIH
  - Men :
    - Men's FIH Hockey World Cup World Cups (including qualifiers for senior teams)
    - Men's FIH Pro League
    - FIH Junior World Cup
  - Women's :
    - Women's FIH Hockey World Cup
    - Women's FIH Junior World Cup World Cups (including qualifiers for senior teams)
  - Women's FIH Pro League
- Asia Hockey
  - Men :
    - Men's Hockey Asia Cup
  - Women :
    - Women's Hockey Asia Cup
- MHC
  - Sultan Azlan Shah Cup
  - Malaysia Hockey League

=== Netball ===
- Asian Netball Championships
- Netball World Cup
- Netball Super League

=== Sepak takraw ===
- ISTAF
- Sepak Takraw League (including Champions Cup tournament)

=== Motorsport ===
- Asia Road Racing Championship
- Malaysia Superbike Championship
- Malaysia Championship Series

=== e-Sports ===
- Mobile Legends: Bang Bang
  - MPL MY :
    - MPL MY Season 11 (2023)
    - MPL MY Season 12 (2023)
    - MPL MY Season 13 (2024)
    - MPL MY Season 14 (2024)
    - MPL MY Jaguh All Star (2024)
    - MPL MY Season 15 (2025)
  - Mid-Season Cup :
    - Mid-Season Cup (MSC 2024)
  - M Series :
    - M5 Wild Card (2023)
    - M5 World Championship (2023)
    - M6 Wild Card (2024)
    - M6 World Championship (2024)
- PUBG Mobile
  - PUBG Mobile Pro League S7 (PMPL MY 2023)
  - PUBG Mobile Super League 2023 (PMSL 2023)
  - PUBG Mobile PMSL SEA Fall 2023
  - PUBG Mobile Conquer Series (PMCS MY 2024)
  - PUBG Mobile World Cup - PMWC Riyadh eWC (2024)
  - PUBG Mobile Super League SEA Fall (PMSL SEA Fall 2024)
  - PUBG Mobile National Championship (PMNC 2024)
- Free Fire
  - Free Fire World Series Sea Spring (2024)
  - Free Fire World Series MY Fall (2024)
  - Free Fire World Series Global Finals (2024)
  - Free Fire Malaysia Championship Spring (2025)
  - Free Fire World Series SEA (Pre-Season) (2025)
- Dota 2
  - Dota 2 Riyadh Masters (2024)
- Honor of Kings
  - HOK Invitational S2 Grand Finals MY (2024)
- Valorant
  - Valorant Challengers (2024)

=== Multi-sport events ===
- Commonwealth Games
- Summer Olympic Games
- Winter Olympic Games
- Asian Games
- SEA Games

=== Former ===
- AFF
  - ASEAN Championship (until 2025)
- FIFA
  - FIFA World Cup (until 2022)

==== Football ====
===== Soccer =====
- UEFA
  - UEFA European Championship (until 2021)
  - UEFA Nations League (until 2022)
- MFL
  - Malaysia Premier League (until 2014)
- DFL
  - Bundesliga (until 2022–23)
- Eredivisie (until 2022–23)

==== Hockey ====
- Sultan of Johor Cup (until 2014)

==== Motorsport ====
- Malaysia Speed Festival (until 2019)

== Shows ==
- Formasi
- Formasi Ekstra
- Forum
- Grandstand Ahad
- Kafe Sukan
- Masa Tambahan
- Nadi Arena
- Raket
- Bola@Mamak
- Arena Sukan
- Sehari Bersama
- Flik
- Dengan Izin
- Sorakan 12
- Masa Tambahan – Arena Bola
- Masa Tambahan – Antarabangsa
- Arena Bola
- Deskripsi Nadi Arena – DNA
- Jalur 14 (Exclusive programme from previous eGG Network's show)
- FYP (Exclusive programme from previous eGG Network's show)

== See also ==
- Astro SuperSport
- Astro
