= Datastream Digital =

Brunei Telecommunications Company

Datastream Digital Sdn Bhd
- Trade name: DST
- Formerly: DataStream Technology Sdn Bhd (1995–2020)
- Company type: Private (Government-linked)
- Industry: Telecommunications
- Founded: 1995; 31 years ago in Bandar Seri Begawan, Brunei
- Founder: Government of Brunei
- Headquarters: DST Group Building, Bandar Seri Begawan, Brunei
- Number of locations: 9
- Area served: Brunei
- Key people: Haji Sofian bin Haji Mohammad Jani (Chairman); Radin Sufri bin Radin Basiuni (CEO); Boon Ho Andy Lai (CIO); Melina Jaini (Associate VP of People Ops)
- Products: Mobile phone; Fixed line; Internet services; Broadband; 5G services; Digital payment solutions
- Brands: Easi; Prima; Infinity; Mobi; Freedom
- Services: Mobile telecommunications; Fixed broadband; Enterprise solutions; Digital transformation consulting; IoT services; Cloud services
- Owner: Darussalam Assets
- Number of employees: 700 (2014) (2014)
- Subsidiaries: DST Communications Sdn Bhd; Integrated Communications Sdn Bhd; DST Technical Services Sdn Bhd; DST Payphone Sdn Bhd; DST Multimedia Sdn Bhd; Kristal KRU Sdn Bhd; Kristal Merchandising Sdn Bhd; Kristal Media Sdn Bhd; DST Solutions Sdn Bhd; Former: DST Network Sdn Bhd (discontinued); Kristal-Astro Sdn Bhd (discontinued March 2022)
- 5G Launch: June 22, 2023
- Market Position: Market leader in Brunei
- Notable Partnerships: MultiSys (Philippines), Huawei, Samsung
- CSR Focus: Education, special needs support, digital inclusion
- Website: dst.com.bn

Datastream Digital Sendirian Berhad, (doing business as DST, formerly known as DataStream Technology Sendirian Berhad), is a Brunei-based government-linked conglomerate headquartered in the DST Group Building in Bandar Seri Begawan, Brunei. It was established in 1995 and as of December 2021 has at least 420,000 subscribers.

== History ==
Integrated Communication Sendirian Berhad (DSTINCOMM), a local distributor of telecommunication products, was incorporated in July 1994, DataStream Technology Sendirian Berhad (DST) the main holding company was incorporated in April 1994 alongside DST Communication Sendirian Berhad (DSTCom), it was created in an attempt to end the monopoly held by BruNet where it was the first operator to introduce 2G (GSM 900) services to Brunei.

Kristal-Astro was incorporated in September 1999 as a joint venture between the Malaysian company MEASAT. It launched its satellite television services on 24 January 2000 and held a monopoly on pay tv in the country. The services were terminated on March 31, 2022.

In May 2008 DST introduced 3G services in Brunei. They launch of 3G was however beaten by b-mobile. Prior to this they held a monopoly on 2G and was in an ogliopoly with JTB for PSTN services.

In November 2013 DST partnered with Ericsson to launch 4G services in the sultanate. The main concern was not speed but network congestion with frequent complaints in populous areas of the country. Until 2020 DST held a monopoly on 4G services in the country.

In 2016 it was reported by the CEO, Suhaimi Hussain, that he believed that the launch of the 4G LTE network, in collaboration with Huawei was a success. He also stated that the company had also decided to invest in the Singaporean telecommunications company MyRepublic and was looking at further opportunities at expansion outside of Brunei.

On 10 July 2019, DST signed an agreement with SACOFA to help with improving the infrastructure in the Malaysian state of Sarawak.

Throughout January 2020, DST underwent a major rebranding. They received a new company name, a new logo, and spun off several subsidiaries like Kristal-Astro, Kristal FM, DSTFascom and DSTINCOMM.

On 22 January, DST, along with the other 2 telcos: Progresif and imagine, announced that they would be rolling out new service offerings on the 24th. This came after a restructuring in the handling of the national infrastructure in which it all got consolidated into a separate company called Unified National Networks, where the goals of the asset takeover was to increase competition and increase choice. The new plans were announced by DST's CEO and DST's chairman, second Ministry of Finance Dato Seri Setia Dr Awang Haji Mohd Amin Liew bin Abdullah, at The Empire. This led to a renaming of their postpaid services from "Prima" to "Mobi" and "GO!broadband" to "Freedom", while also simplifying their existing plans, another change that was unveiled was the release of some new bundle packs for their "Eas!" prepaid mobile phone services. DST also announced their first forray into the Fibre to the Home segment of broadband internet with the launch of their fixed line packages.

On 6 August, DST's CEO, Radin Sufri Radin Basiuni, signed an agreement with MultiSys to improve DST's systems to improve efficiency and provide additional services to DST subscribers. This collaboration came to fruition with the release of the MyDST app and website to DST subscribers in May 2021.

On 15 September, it was announced that DST had collaborated with the Ministry of Health (Brunei) to revamp the call centre for emergency services in the country. The upgrade now allows for 30 concurrent phone calls from all districts in the country, an increase from 15 that only worked for three of the four districts.

5G services was launched and made available on 22 June 2023. Previous 5G trials were conducted in April 2021 utilising new and existing radio frequency spectrum to provide high-capacity bandwidth in all high internet traffic areas, and according to AITI, the internet speed on the 5G network is expected to reach between 300 Mbit/s and one Gbps.

== Services ==
Since at least 2013 DST in conjunction with Progresif and MachTel offer the option of having O level, IGCSE, A level or PSR results SMSed to students on results day. On 19 February 2016 DST now offered the same SMS results service for SSSRU examinations.

=== Charity ===
In 2011 DST raised $22,780 through its SMS Brunei Prihatin service in donations in response to the February 2011 Christchurch earthquake and various floods in Australia. In 2015 DST raised $103,725 for the National Orphans' Fund through the same service.
