= Astro (company) =

Malaysian direct broadcast satellite pay TV service

Measat Broadcast Network Systems Sdn. Bhd.
- Current logo, a third iteration of the 2003 logo, used since 2024.

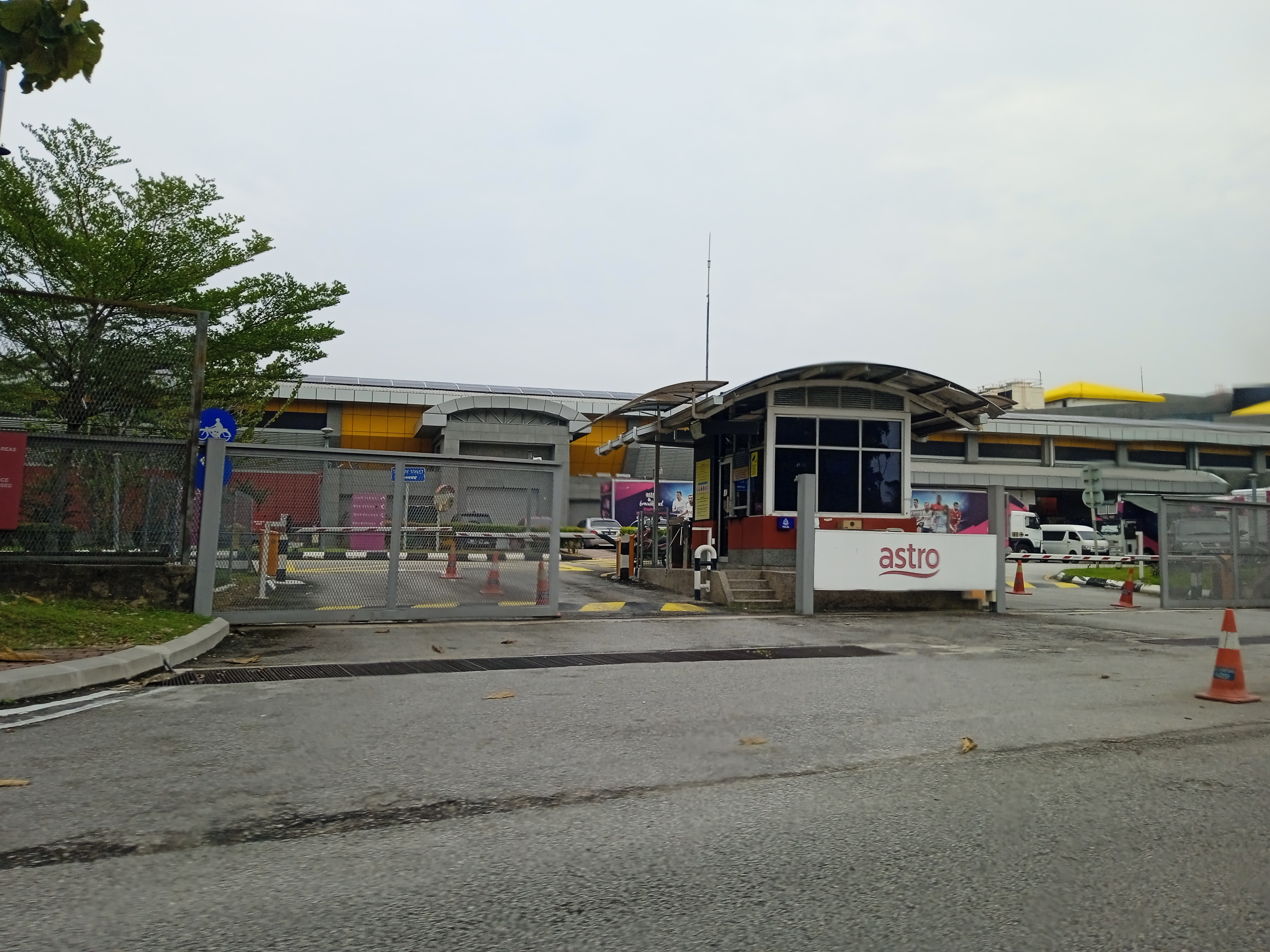
- Astro headquarters in Technology Park Malaysia
- Type: Subsidiary
- Industry: Mass media; Digital media; Entertainment
- Founded: 1 June 1996; 30 years ago
- Founder: Ananda Krishnan
- Headquarters: All Asia Broadcast Centre (AABC), Technology Park Malaysia, Bukit Jalil, 57000 Kuala Lumpur, Malaysia
- Area served: Nationwide
- Key people: Tunku Ali Redhauddin (Chairman); Henry Tan (Interim CEO)
- Products: OTT Streaming; Direct broadcast satellite Internet service provider
- Revenue: ▼RM695.6 million (Q4 2025)
- Net income: ▼RM9.19 million (2025)
- Parent: Astro Malaysia Holdings Berhad
- Website: www.astro.com.my

All-Asian Satellite Television and Radio Operators, doing business as Astro (stylized in lowercase title), is a Malaysian pay satellite television, streaming television and IPTV provider. It is a wholly owned subsidiary of the Astro Malaysia Holdings Berhad and is operated by the communication satellite operator MEASAT Broadcast Network Systems Sdn. Bhd. It operates from the All Asia Broadcast Centre (AABC) in Kuala Lumpur and the MEASAT in Cyberjaya.

It forms part of the mass media duopoly in the country alongside the Media Prima. Astro launched the high-definition platform Astro B.yond in 2009 and the IPTV platform Astro IPTV in 2011, with the latter targeted at consumers who were unable to receive the company's satellite services. The ultra high-definition (UHD) platform Astro Ultra was launched at the end of 2019 while the full high-definition (FHD) platform (replacement of Astro B.yond) called Astro Ulti was introduced in the mid of 2021. Astro operated in Indonesia from 2006 to 2008, under the Astro Nusantara and also in Brunei from 2000 to 2022, under the Kristal-Astro brand. Indonesian operations were led by the PT Direct Vision, while Bruneian were led by Kristal Sdn. Bhd. In 2016, the company was recorded as achieving 71% household penetration in Malaysia.

== History ==
=== Formation and early years ===
Astro first logo, used until 2003.

The licence to operate Astro, then unnamed, was given in June 1994 and was planned to have 20 channels through the Measat satellite. It was originally planned to launch in 1995, but postponed to 1996 with the launching initially took place in October and would be known as the All-Asia Satellite Television and Radio Operator, abbreviated as ASTRO and to be operated under its operating company, Measat Broadcasting Networks Systems. The upcoming satellite TV provider will offer 22 television channels and 8 radio stations in its platform.

Ahead of its launch, Astro's operator, Measat Broadcast Networks Systems expected that its satellite TV and radio services will gain profit within two-and-a-half to three years with a total of 700,000 subscriber base.

Astro was launched on 25 September 1996, three months after its establishment. Upon its launch, the company planned to offer the internet speed facility to its customers by early 1997.

Astro signed an agreement with Maybank which allows its subscribers to settle their monthly fees via the autophone and autodebit services as well as via automatic bill settlement facility provided by the bank through Visa and Mastercard.

Astro planned to open four out of seven showrooms nationwide by the first quarter of 1997. The company also planned to reach the target of 400 installations as early as January 1997. Astro also submitted its proposal to began broadcasting overseas. Two months later, the company entered a joint-venture with film production companies to produce program varieties.

On 1 April 1997, Astro appointed MOCCIS Trading, a trading arm of MOCCIS Berhad, to market and promote its service to its members via a monthly payment scheme.

Astro planned to establish its own private telecommunications network as part of its preparation to launch a range of multimedia interactive services as well as to increase its business reach. The company also spent RM25 million to enhance its services for domestic and global market.

Astro became the first client of the Canadian telecommunication equipment company, Nortel's Global Account programme for the ASEAN region. In July 1997, the company signed a Memorandum of Understanding (MoU) with Faber Group Berhad in which Astro will provide its satellite television services to seven of Faber-owned Sheraton hotels.

From 27 September to 16 November 1997, Astro offers installation fees for its Direct-to-U system installation. It also targets at least 20,000 hotels for its pay-television operations by the year-end.

In December 1997, Astro partnered with Oracle Corporation in which the latter would help developing its web-based corporate database for its business strategy. It also allocates RM100 million to provide a Direct-to-U price subsidy to its customers.

In 1998, Astro plans to expand its operations in the Philippines and Taiwan with RM200 million of allocation. The plan was later abandoned for unknown reasons.

=== Expansion of operations ===
Between 2000 and 2006, Astro shared time with TV Pendidikan, Malaysian public educational TV channel, where it shared time with Animal Planet on Channel 28 from 2000 to 2001 and with now-defunct TechTV on Channel 13 from 2002 to 2006. The move received much criticism from many parties, demanding that the network should remain aired on public broadcaster, RTM rather than Astro at least until 2002. However, Astro decided to not aired TV Pendidikan upon the expiration of its 6-year agreement with the channel's operator, the Ministry of Education, resulting TV Pendidikan moved to TV9, owned by media conglomerate Media Prima in 2007.

In 2000, Astro's residential subscriber base have exceeded about 300,000 households in just three years after its official launch. Astro also targets a total of a million subscribers nationwide in the next two years. The company enters a joint-venture with DST Group's Kristal Sdn. Bhd. from Brunei to launch Kristal-Astro on 24 January 2000. The service, however, ceased operations 22 years later, in 2022.

The company had invested over RM1 billion to build a digital broadcasting facility and developed a multimedia services. Astro also spent at least RM350 to subsidized its Digital Multimedia System (DMS) in order to make its service is "affordable for more Malaysian families". The company also planned to expand its services across Asian region.

By June 2001, Astro's subscription total has increased to 600,000.

In April 2002, Astro signed an agreement with Scripps Networks Interactive for the distribution of six TV series from HGTV in Malaysia and Brunei.

By September the same year, Astro reduced 10% of its staffs under the voluntary separation scheme (VSS).

The company set up a joint-venture company with Indonesian conglomerate, Lippo Group to provide pay-TV service in Indonesia as early as July 2005. As a result, Astro's satellite TV service in Indonesia, known as Astro Nusantara was launched in March 2006. It also invested RM500 million to support its operations in the republic. However, Astro Nusantara only operated for two years and ceased operations when Astro ended their joint-venture with PT Direct Vision in September 2008.

On 1 October 2007, Astro renumbered all of its channel numbers from 2-digits to 3-digits to accommodate its expanding number of channels.

In 2007, Astro dominates 29% of television viewership market in Malaysia, after Media Prima (54%) and Radio Televisyen Malaysia (17%).

In December 2009, Astro launched its high-definition service, known as Astro B.yond with a new decoder set and channels in HD feeds.

Astro partnered with TIME dotCom Berhad in December 2010 to implementated the broadband and IPTV service in Klang Valley and Penang.

In 2013, Astro signed an agreement with Telekom Malaysia's wholly owned subsidiary, TM Net Sdn. Bhd. to broadcast two Astro SuperSport channels on the latter's pay-TV service, HyppTV (later known as Unifi TV).

=== Recent developments ===
Astro logo, a second iteration of the 2003 logo, used from 2012 until 2024.

On 1 December 2014, Astro signed a joint-venture with South Korean retail company, GS Retail Co. Ltd. to launch a home shopping channel, Go Shop. However, the joint-venture only survived for 9 years and following the changing in consumer's shopping landscape, Go Shop ceased operations on 12 October 2023 as part of the company's "ongoing strategic realignment underway".

In March 2016, Astro launched its regional video platform, Tribe, which targets to Indonesian market.

In 2017, Astro enters a strategic partnership with CJ E&M from South Korea to create and produced contents and events for ASEAN market. The company also enters a long-term partnership with print publishing company, Karangkraf to form a joint-venture company focused on content production, Karangkraf Digital 360, which was later renamed as Nu Ideaktiv.

Astro alongside Media Prima and DiGi Telecommunications collaborated to launch a digital learning hub, known as JomStudi in January 2019. The initiative, which supported by the Malaysia Digital Economy Corporation (MDEC), provides educational resources in a single platform which accessible to students.

The company enters a partnership with Chinese streaming platform, IQIYI in 2019, in which Astro acquired an exclusive rights to distributed the IQIYI's content in Malaysia. Astro also responsible for the latter's customer acquisition, marketing and media sales.

On 1 April 2020, Astro rearranged its channel numbers in order to prioritize its 100 HD channels on its platform.

In 2021, Astro partnered with Netflix to expand its content offering in which the latter's service will be made available on Astro's platform.

In May 2024, Astro and state-owned public service broadcaster, Radio Televisyen Malaysia (RTM) have partnered to envisioned an initiative in support to Palestine by launching Malaysia4Palestine, a special channel dedicated to highlighting the humanitarian crisis in Palestine in the wake of the ongoing Gaza war. The channel began one-day broadcasting on 25 May 2024. Among artistes who involved in the project were Siti Nurhaliza, M. Nasir, Syafinaz Selamat, Alif Satar, Soo Wincci, Sarimah Ibrahim, Aznil Nawawi and Wani Kayrie.

On 17 October, Astro revamp its sports content lineup which will feature new names and channel numbers. The change will saw Astro SuperSport channels which will be replaced with Astro-branded sports channels, such as Astro Premier League (primally aired Premier League matches), Astro Football (which aired other football leagues and tournaments), Astro Badminton (primally aired all of the BWF tournaments) and Astro Sports Plus (which aired other sporting events, such as the NBA basketball, UFC/One Championship fights, NASCAR races, among others).

Astro announced on 18 November that both Astro Warna and Astro Premier would be discontinued as a linear TV channel and merged both channels with Astro Prima and Astro Citra respectively, to match the Astro's new corporate branding. The merger between Citra and Premier took effect two days later, on 20 November, while the merger of Prima and Warna took effect on 3 December. Under this plan, Astro Warna and Astro Premier will exclusively operated as a content hub on Astro on Demand and Astro GO. However, Astro Warna's permanent shutdown received negative feedback from netizens which supported its closure, citing that "there is no any improvements for programmes aired" a part of programmes that aired repeatedly on the channel.

On 2 December, Astro begin leasing a ABS-CBN Corporation-owned property, ABS-CBN Soundstage at the Horizon IT Park, San Jose del Monte, Bulacan, Philippines, to increase its global footprint. At the same time, it introduced Astro One, an entertainment package which includes three new packages: Entertainment, Sports, and Epic, which "is built with a customer-first approach".

On 3 December 2025, Astro Shaw entering an partnership with Double Vision and Philippine ABS-CBN's studios division to co-produce three drama television series, including the remake of 2008 action drama series Kahit Isang Saglit which had starred Jericho Rosales and Carmen Soo.

Euan Smith resigned as the CEO of Astro on 8 June 2026 after 3 years. Former Astro CEO, Henry Tan assume as the interim CEO from 16 June.

On 26 June, Astro expands partnership with RTM "to widen access to quality content across multiple broadcasting platforms". The expanded collaboration would see RTM channels to be available on Astro again very soon, including Sukan+, Berita RTM and RTM's radio networks.

In July, Astro introduced a new streaming service called X3, which was intended to be a "no box, no installation and no contract" platform. The platform's launching date is set to 20 July.

== Services and products ==
=== Astro B.yond ===
Astro launched its own high-definition platform called Astro B.yond on 11 December 2009. Its rollout costed RM200 million, including marketing and operating costs of approximately RM150 million. It introduced a PVR with an external hard disk drive connected to the decoder. The PVR comes with an inbuilt 500 GB hard disk and allows customers to record up to two live programmes at one time, rewind, and pause live TV. Recording services are also available through Astro B.yond via a compatible external hard disk drive and activation of the recording service by Astro.

=== Astro Go ===
The streaming service of Astro was launched in 2012 called Astro On-The-Go (AOTG). The launch of the app enabled customers to access to Astro's TV channels, live events, Video-On-Demand (VOD) and Catch Up TV on mobile devices. The app was also made for international users in March 2013.

The app was renamed to Astro Go on 31 March 2017 and saw a significant revamp that introduced several new features, such as a more user-friendly interface, improved video playback quality, and better content discovery tools. Astro Go offers personalized content recommendations based on viewing history and preferences and allows customers to download shows for offline viewing.

=== Astro Fibre ===
Astro embarked on its broadband service in 2011 by collaborating with TIME dotCom to serve content over broadband through its Astro B.yond IPTV service. To further its place in the ISP space, Astro entered a partnership with sister company Maxis in 2019, resulting in the introduction of Astro & Broadband. In 2022, Astro became an ISP and began offering standalone broadband through Astro Fibre, which is also offered to businesses through its BIZfibre services.

=== Astro NJOI ===
Astro NJOI is a Malaysia's first free-to-view satellite TV service by Astro. Launched in collaboration with the Government of Malaysia on 18 February 2012, it debuted with 18 channels and 19 radio stations. Currently, NJOI offers more than 50 channels in Full HD, most of the channels are available through newly revamped Family Pack.

=== Connected boxes ===
In November 2019, Astro launched the Ultra Box, its first self-installable set-top box which can be used with satellite or broadband/Wi-Fi. The main features are its better viewing experience with 4K UHD and access to cloud-based video recording as well as video-on-demand content.

Expanding its set-top box offerings, Astro introduced the Ulti Box in 2021 which showcases similar features to the Ultra Box. The key difference is that the Ulti Box only provides HD resolutions rather than a 4K UHD experience.

== Criticism and controversies ==
=== Monopoly over paid television market ===
Astro has been criticised for its monopolistic practices in which it has become the dominant paid television service in Malaysia while its competitors ABNXcess, Mega TV, and MiTV were not able to compete against Astro and became defunct after its launch. Astro was the sole paid television operator in Malaysia until 2017 when another competitor, Telekom Malaysia's Unifi TV, emerged as a strong cord-cutting alternative.

The Malaysian government's plan to regulate Android-based set-top boxes in 2019 raised concerns that Astro's dominance over the country's television content market would be enhanced. While Astro's exclusive rights to Malaysian broadcast content expired in 2017, the company continues to have non-exclusive broadcast privileges under the Communications and Multimedia Act 1998. Starting in 2022, the Malaysian Communications and Multimedia Commission will provide Content Applications Service Provider (CASP) licenses to 35 broadcasting companies, four of which are approved to deliver content via satellite television.

=== Sports content dispute ===
Astro has also enjoyed control of the broadcasting rights for sports events, including all Liga Super and Piala Malaysia events, and the FIFA World Cup 2014 and 2018. Competitors were restricted from airing those events, or were required by regulators to pay excessive royalties to Astro. The high royalty fees were criticised by Jeremy Kung, executive vice president of TM New Media, who argued that sports content on free-to-air television channels should be made available to public for free. Former Information, Communications, Arts and Culture minister Rais Yatim urged the media groups who had exclusive rights to major sports events to share their content to free-to-air television channels. Pakatan Harapan youth chief Nik Nazmi Nik Ahmad argued that the rights to broadcast English Premier League should be co-licensed with Radio Television Malaysia instead of being restricted to Astro.

Astro's short-lived Indonesian operations were also subject of investigation by Indonesian regulators, and accusations by rival providers, over allegations of the company also monopolizing Premier League rights in the country.

=== Overcharging ===
Astro has been criticised for raising its service prices and imposing penalty fees on customers. In 2007, Astro raised its service fee about 15% and converted previously free channels like Bloomberg, Al Jazeera English, and CGTN into paid channels. Anyone who attempted to drop such service packages was charged a fee. Malaysiakini reporter Cheah Kah Seng encouraged customers to protest against the price hikes and provided instructions on how to do so. Due to broadcasting rights it has received from the Malaysian government, Astro raised its fees several more times in the following years, while consumers had fewer competitive alternatives.

Astro often shows commercials on premium channels for which consumers paid for an ad-free experience. Customers who use the Astro personal video recorder (PVR), Astro MAX, have reported performance problems and difficulty in recording certain channels.

=== Advertising on pay television channels ===
Paid channels carried on Astro usually carries traditional commercial advertising that will be shown on commercial break, despite customers had paid for the paid television channels.

=== Illegal streaming ===
The illegal use of decrypting Astro channels has been around for over 20 years. The first recorded case of illegal streaming was done via card cloning in which there were 11 clone Astro smartcards were found in June & July 2003. In response to card cloning & piracy, Astro had launched the card swap exercise in August 2004. According to Astro's official website, it was done to prevent piracy & to ensure that security levels had been enhanced with the new red & blue colour cards, compared to the previous gold cards. By 30 September 2004, the gold-colour smartcards used to decrypt subscribed Astro channels had been disabled & deactivated. Customers are also encouraged to destroy the old gold smartcard by splitting it into 2 parts.

=== Repetitive content ===
One of the main criticisms targeted to Astro is its excessive airing of a program many times.

== Awards and accolades ==
Year	Award-giving body	Category	Recipient	Result	Ref.
2009	CASBAA Award 2009	Chairman's Award	Astro	Won	
2019	MIRA Awards 2019	Best Company for Investor Relations	Astro	Won	
2023	Putra Brand Awards 2022	Media Network Award	Astro	Platinum	
2023	Putra Brand Awards 2022	Communications Network Award	Astro	Platinum	
2023	Putra Brand Awards 2022	e-Commerce Award	Astro	Platinum	
2024	Putra Brand Awards 2023	Media Network Award	Astro	Platinum	

== See also ==
- Television in Malaysia
- Digital television in Malaysia
- Kristal-Astro

Other pay-TV service provider:

- Mega TV
- ABNXcess
- U Television (formerly known as MiTV)
- Unifi TV
- MYTV Broadcasting
