= Kristal-Astro =

Pay TV service in Brunei

Kristal Astro
- Type: Direct Broadcast Satellite
- Country: Brunei
- Founded: 24 January 2000; 26 years ago
- Headquarters: Bandar Seri Begawan, Brunei
- Broadcast area: Nationwide
- Owner: Astro, DST Group
- Parent: Astro Malaysia Holdings Berhad
- Dissolved: 31 March 2022; 4 years ago
- Official website: www.kristalastro.com (archive)

Kristal Astro (Jawi: كريستل استرو) was a sole operator of Brunei's multi-channel pay-TV service. It was officially launched on 24 January 2000. The company is a joint-venture between DST Group's Kristal Sdn. Bhd. and Malaysia's MEASAT Broadcast Network Systems Sdn. Bhd., a subsidiary of Astro Malaysia Holdings Berhad.

All channels are censored to ensure that all programs adhere to Brunei's religious, cultural, and social values. Subscribers will also have access to pay-per-view services, as well as a wide range of interactive services, such as home banking, home shopping, and distance learning.

Subscribers receive the satellite service using the Digital Multimedia System (DMS), the same system introduced by Astro in Malaysia. The channel line-up was the same as the Malaysian parent, but without the Malaysian terrestrial channels.

== History ==
=== Kristal ===
The history of Kristal-Astro begins with the establishment of Kristal (Jawi: کریستل تیۏي) which is a pay television network owned by DataStream Technology Sdn Bhd (DST Sdn Bhd) and the first television network in Brunei. Kristal was granted a license to provide radio and television broadcasting services on 23 November 1998 and began its services on 2 January 1999 with an offer of 14 television channels to customers nationwide.

Before the introduction of Kristal, the people of Brunei watched television shows through the STAR TV network for free for several years. With the launch of Kristal, Bruneians were no longer be able to watch the channels for free and some television channels have had their broadcasts cut off, among them MTV, Channel V, Phoenix and Zee Cinema. Kristal did not provide any explanation regarding the cutting of the channels involved, but the public believed that the action was due to pressure from the Ministry of Religious Affairs of Brunei.

At the beginning of 1999, the broadcasting of the MTV channel, which was popular among the youth of Brunei, was stopped. Following this incident, letters of complaint were sent to the Borneo Bulletin in January and February. The ministry and the Bruneian authorities expressed concern about the channel's inappropriate content. The Brunei government later agreed to allow the broadcasting of MTV while other shows were blocked.

On 1 February, the Brunei government declared ASTRO's channels from Malaysia reached through Kristal illegal because Astro was not granted a license to broadcast in Brunei. Hundreds of people currently subscribing to Astro are said to have broken the law and could be fined Br$40,000 or imprisoned for three years.

However, on 1 March, the Brunei government declared that ASTRO's broadcasts had been licensed and approved to broadcast in Brunei legally. Even so, the owner of the satellite dish must make a payment of Br$360 per year to the government in addition to the subscription fee of the broadcaster involved.

=== Joint venture between Kristal and Astro ===
Kristal-Astro is the result of a joint venture between KRISTAL Media and Astro Malaysia. KRISTAL Media is a subsidiary of DataStream Technology Group (DST Group), which is a conglomerate of nine communication and broadcasting companies. The DST Sdn Bhd holding of the DST Group was formed in April 1995. The joint venture between KRISTAL Sdn Bhd and MEASAT Broadcast Network Systems Sdn Bhd in Malaysia resulted in a combined company Kristal-Astro Sdn Bhd. As the result of this joint effort, the Kristal-Astro transmission service was officially launched on 24 January 2000.

Astro-Kristal customers receive satellite services through the Digital Multimedia System (DMS) which is the same service received by Astro customers in Malaysia. The television system used in Brunei is PAL.

By 2005, Kristal-Astro offered more than 30 channels to customers.

In 2008, Kristal-Astro launched a 3G network to enable DST to offer more channels, a total of 80 television and radio channels.

Kristal-Astro launched high definition (HD) broadcasting in Brunei in June 2010 under the Astro B.yond brand. In line with the launch, Kristal-Astro released the Astro B.yond Personal Video Recorder (PVR) in early 2011.

Kristal-Astro in collaboration with Rewind Networks has launched the HITS HD channel (720_{HD}) in the Kristal-Astro HD package starting 1 July 2016. This channel broadcasts television programs with Malay subtitles with high definition pictures.

Starting 1 January 2020, Phoenix Chinese Channel (358) and Phoenix InfoNews Channel (323) as well as Sky News HD channel (514_{HD}) ceased broadcasting through Kristal-Astro. At the same time, Kristal Astro revamped the service packages provided which are Family, Sapphire, Ruby and Jade.

Starting 1 May 2021, the Standard Edition (SD) Sport channel service which includes Astro SuperSport (831), Astro SuperSport 2 (832), Astro SuperSport 3 (833), Astro SuperSport 4 (834) and Eurosport (840) will be discontinued. Kristal Astro stated that this channel is only available in high definition quality (HD) through a subscription to the Santai HD or Santai Sport HD package. For this reason, customers who are still using the old Set-Top Box are advised to switch to an HD Set-Top Box to subscribe to high-definition channels.

=== End of service ===
Kristal Astro has announced that it is shutting down in Brunei after 22 years of operation. According to its official notice, Kristal Astro has ceased operations on 31 March 2022, at 11:59 pm. The statement mentions "considering the fast-changing technology trends causing huge shifts in consumer preferences towards digital media consumption, we have come to a fork in the road that calls for us to make this difficult decision. We sincerely apologize for any inconvenience this may cause." With its closure, its subscribers had to resort to the overspill signals from Malaysian digital terrestrial television provider MYTV Broadcasting, which is easily accessible within Brunei's borders.

== See also ==
- Astro Malaysia
