= DST Group =

DST Group may refer to:

- DataStream Technology Group, Brunei (e.g. DST Group Building)
- Defence Science and Technology Group, Australia's Defence research agency
