= Astro MAX =

Malaysian personal video recorder service

- Company type: Public
- Industry: Digital video recorders
- Founded: June 2006
- Defunct: 2008
- Fate: Discontinued in 2008
- Successor: Astro B.yond PVR
- Headquarters: Bukit Jalil, Kuala Lumpur
- Key people: Rohana Rozhan
- Website: www.astro.com.my

Astro MAX was a personal video recorder (PVR) service for Astro launched in July 2006. It marked the first PVR system ever to be introduced in Malaysia, although LG's PVR-integrated Time Machine TV was introduced later that year. Its successor was the Astro B.yond PVR.

== Technical information ==
Astro MAX came to light in July 2006 as a combined digital satellite receiver/decoder and personal video recorder (PVR), as well as a rival for the upcoming LG's television integrated with a similar digital video recorder, the Time Machine TV. It allowed recording, pausing and instantly rewinding live TV, as well as a 30-second skip. The unit also had a 30-minute buffer which constantly recorded the currently watched program. Full integration with Astro's electronic programme guide enabled selections of programmes to be recorded. Additional features included the ability to record all audio tracks and all subtitle tracks on multiple language programming. Copies of programmes recorded would also be transferred to DVD or VHS tape. The system performed these functions using an internal hard drive inside the Astro MAX set top box. Programming was recorded without converting the DVB-S-compliant MPEG2 digital satellite stream, so that the recorded video is the same quality as the broadcast feed.

The Astro MAX system was similar to TiVo. It was equipped with twin digital satellite tuners which allowed the recording of one programme while viewing another. However, the system was not able to allow recording of two channels and programmes at the same time.

There was no service fee for the use of the Astro MAX system.

== Production and reception ==
The reception of the system was generally poor, as the PVR would start and stop recording according to the time of day, based on the Electronic Program Guide. Unfortunately, on some channels the shows did not start or finish on time. This resulted in the recorded show missing the beginning or the end. The Electronic Program Guide was often inaccurate and the PVR was often unreliable. Complaints were made regarding sensitivity, lock-ups and reboots.

A new variant was also being looked into, and would have had 100 hours of recording time and would have made more use of video-on-demand services. A pitch for its service was called, though no agencies were known to be invited. At the time, Astro's account was currently split between Y&R and Naga DDB. In the end, the variant was not made public, as the service was terminated and shut down.

The reasons behind the discontinuation of the Astro Max decoders and the eventual closure of the service is currently unknown. The people who worked behind Astro Max were all reassigned to other roles.

Astro suspended support for all existing Astro MAX customers on 10 October 2010. All existing Astro Max customers were offered to change to Astro B.yond PVR.

== See also ==
- Astro B.yond
- Digital video recorder
- TiVo
