= MITV =

MITV may refer to:

- CIHF-TV or Maritimes Independent Television, a former Canadian TV station
- Murhi International Television, a Nigerian TV station
- MiTV, a pay-TV service offered in Malaysia
- Myanmar International, a Burmese state-owned national and international English-language television channel
- More Issues Than Vogue, K. Michelle's third studio album
- Xiaomi TV, also known as MiTV, a smart TV designed and marketed by Xiaomi
