= B-Mobile =

Former mobile phone carrier in Brunei

B-Mobile Communications Sendirian Berhad
- Company type: Joint venture
- Industry: Telecommunications
- Founded: 2005
- Founder: TelBru; QAF Comserve
- Defunct: 2013
- Successor: Progresif
- Headquarters: Bandar Seri Begawan, Brunei
- Area served: Brunei
- Products: Mobile telephones; Internet services
- Services: HSDPA; UMTS; W-CDMA; EDGE; GPRS; GSM
- Parent: Telekom Brunei Berhad
- Website: www.bmobile.com.bn

B-Mobile Communications Sendirian Berhad (stylized as b•mobile) was a joint venture company between (Telekom Brunei Berhad) and QAF Comserve. Granted a 3G license in February 2005, b.mobile was Brunei’s first 3G mobile service provider, utilizing the established UMTS technology. In June 2014, its assets and infrastructure were purchased by a new company, Progresif Cellular.

== See also ==
- List of mobile network operators of the Asia Pacific region
