= Mega TV (Malaysia) =

Malaysian cable television service

Mega TV (CableView Services Sdn. Bhd.)
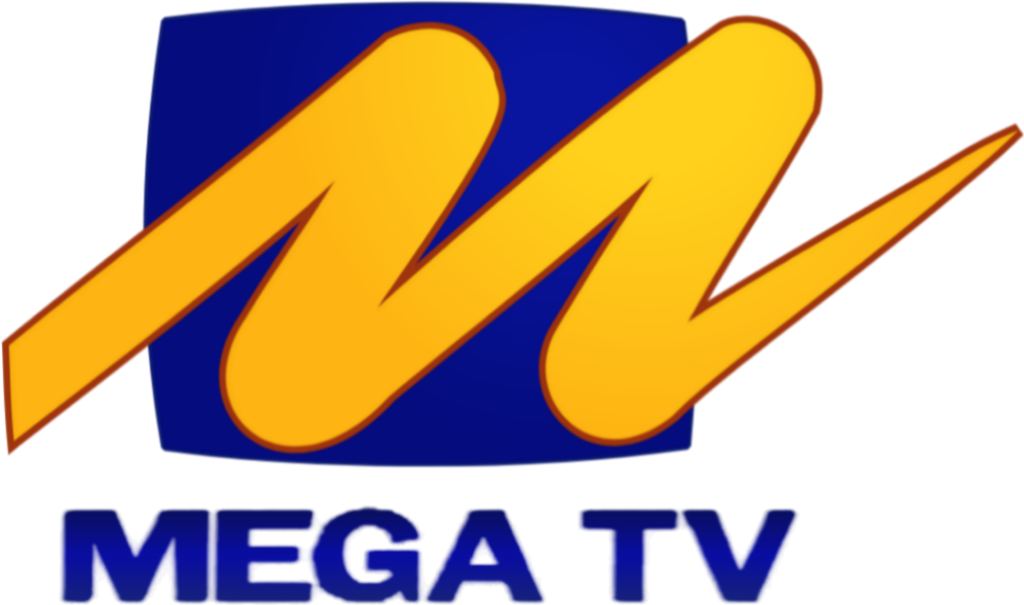
- Type: Subsidiary/Joint venture
- Industry: Cable television
- Founded: 1 November 1995; 30 years ago
- Defunct: 1 October 2001; 24 years ago
- Headquarters: Petaling Jaya, Selangor
- Area served: Malaysia
- Owner: Malaysian Resources Corporation Berhad
- Parent: Sistem Televisyen Malaysia Berhad (40%); MoF, (Inc.) (30%); Eurocrest Sdn. Bhd. (12.5%); Ibex TV (M) Sdn. Bhd. (12.5%); Sri Utara Sdn. Bhd. (5%)

CableView Services Sdn. Bhd., operating as Mega TV was Malaysia's first ever subscription-based pay television service. It was incorporated on 18 October 1994 and began operations on 1 November 1995. It was operated by Sistem Televisyen Malaysia Berhad (TV3), a Malaysian free-to-air television network owned and operated by Malaysian Resources Corporation Berhad (MRCB).

Mega TV was transmitted from its headquarters in Bandar Utama, in the northern fringes of Petaling Jaya, Selangor. It failed to break into the pay television market, and shut down in 2001.

== History ==
Mega TV began as a plan by public broadcaster RTM in 1991 "to spread information to the public". Initially named "Customised News Service", it was renamed "Subscriber News Service" in 1992. The service – jointly operated by the public and private sector – would have a three- to-five channel offering, focusing on news with content from CNN and Britain's ITN and BBC. The service would be transmitted through UHF and received using decoders. The service cost RM 25 million and planned to begin in 1993 with coverage initially limited to the Klang Valley.

In 1993, it was revealed that Subscriber News Service's channel lineup would consist of CNN, BBC and Prime Sports from Star TV, with each channel broadcasting 18 hours a day and without censorship. Subscribers of the service would need to pay RM 50 a month. RTM spent RM 500 million a year to carry those channels. The Economic Planning Unit was tasked to find suitable companies to run the joint venture. At least 11 companies applied for the joint operation of Subscriber News Service in early 1994.

On 11 July 1994, a consortium of companies, consisting of Sistem Televisyen Malaysia Berhad (TV3), Ibex Corporation and Eurocrest (M) Sdn. Bhd., was selected to run the joint venture out of the eleven applicants. The consortium was fully run by Bumiputra companies. The joint venture would be 70% owned by the consortium with RTM taking the rest, with the latter involved in controlling the broadcast and information sources that may harm the safety and values of Malaysia. The Economic Planning Unit chose the three-company consortium as it would guarantee high returns for the government. The service was renamed "Satellite Network Services", with the offering expanded to five channels and would be able to broadcast 24 hours a day.

The following month, TV3 took 40% share of the consortium, with RTM taking 35% and Ibex Corporation and Eurocrest taking 12.5% each. RTM's role would later be handed over to the Ministry of Finance Incorporated (MoF, Inc.) with 30%, along with Sri Utara joining in taking 5% of RTM's former share.

CableView Services Sdn. Bhd., operating under its trade name Mega TV was incorporated on 18 October 1994 by a consortium which consisted of Sistem Televisyen Malaysia Berhad (TV3), Minister of Finance Incorporated (MoF, Inc.), Eurocrest (M) Sdn. Bhd., Ibex TV (M) Sdn. Bhd. and Sri Utara Sdn. Bhd.

In 1995, it was revealed that the consortium – by now known as CableView Services Sdn. Bhd. – would launch in the third quarter of the year, with a plan to provide 30 more channels. This would later be changed to third trimester of 1995, providing a five-channel service. The initial plans were to start the rollout in the Klang Valley, followed by Seremban and Malacca. Mega TV signed a deal with Discovery Communications, the operator of Discovery Channel on 22 June where Discovery's programming in which the then-Education Minister, Najib Razak said that it "will provide another dimension to the (currently weak) English language environment in Malaysia".

By August it was announced that Mega TV was set to start operations on 1 November 1995, after signing a deal to carry HBO Asia.

In September, the Ministry of Information clarified that the Mega TV's subscription payment rate is considered "reasonable".

Cable-based transmissions was officially inaugurated by the 4th Prime Minister of Malaysia, Tun Dr. Mahathir Mohamad and broadcasts from Petaling Jaya on 1 November 1995 through a microwave-based broadcast system.

The company signed a deal with Japanese company, Sony's Malaysia branch to set up about 500 dealership network in November 1995.

Mega TV's service made available in Seremban, Negeri Sembilan and Malacca as early as February 1996, followed by Ipoh, Perak by the end of March.

On 21 April 1996, Mega TV installed a second transmitter station in Bukit Sungai Besi which enabled the cable operator improved its broadcast reception in the Klang Valley.

Mega TV started aired its own news bulletin on 1 July 1996. A months later, in July, Mega TV signed a deal with Shangri-La Hotels and Resorts for a year-term to provide the cable operator's service to the latter's hotel chains.

As early as August 1996, Mega TV said that it would expand its operations in different cities in Peninsular Malaysia by the year-end and at the same time, it appointed 12 installation companies to improved its services.

Mega TV also planned to open more customer service centres across Malaysia as part of its effort to broadening its customer base. The pay-TV operator signed a deal with High-Tech Electronics in September 1996 to authorized at least 90 National Panasonic and Technics partner shops in the country to registered and installing cable television.

Mega TV planned to added more five new channels by the end of 1996. In early 1997, Mega TV setup its own panel of censors to monitoring any of contents which should be aired on its platform.

In May, Mega TV introduced a cat as its mascot and received approval from the Information Ministry to operated more five channels as an addition to existing five channels on its platform.

In early September, it launched three self-packaged channels. The cable TV operator's subscription total increased to 125,000 subscribers by October 1997.

In March 1998, Mega TV targets a total of 230,000 subscribers by the year-end.

In September 1998, a CNN interview with Anwar Ibrahim was interrupted, which Mega TV said it was "an accident". The MoU between Mega TV and UIH Asia-Pacific Communications was ended on 12 October.

In December, Mega TV ceased broadcast of ESPN, but assured that the channel will return on its platform.

By January 1999, Mega TV ceased transmission in some areas in Kedah, Johor and Terengganu.

Mega TV partnered with TV3 and MIMOS in August 1999 to incorporated a new wireless transmission technology for internet use.

Mega TV added a 24-hour Tamil channel, Thangathurai (Golden Screen) on 11 October 1999 to target its Indian subscribers.

In December 1999, Mega TV no longer carries HBO channel on its platform following the expiration of its contract with HBO Asia. By January 2000, Mega TV ceased broadcast on more different locations in six states in Malaysia.

Faced with stiff competition from the Astro satellite television network which was launched seven months later, combined with the failures to expand its content, Mega TV ceased operations on 1 October 2001 as a result, leaving Astro as the one and only pay-TV service provider in Malaysia. Following Mega TV's shutdown, many of its subscribers have been switched to Astro. This comes after its parent company, Malaysian Resources Corporation Berhad (MRCB) on the same date announced to divested itself from its media arm, namely TV3 and the New Straits Times Press (NSTP) and transferring them to Profitune, which primarily focused on multimedia business before it went on to become Media Prima a year later, in 2002.

== Channel listing ==
At the time of launch, in addition to terrestrial channels, Mega TV offered the following channels:

Name	Language	Owner	Group
CNN	English	Turner Broadcasting System	News
Discovery Channel Asia	English (Malay subtitles)	Discovery Communications	Education
ESPN Asia	English	ESPN International	Sports
HBO Asia	English (Malay subtitles)	Home Box Office, Inc.	Movies
Cartoon Network & TNT	English (Malay subtitles)	Turner Broadcasting System	Cartoons and classic movies

== See also ==
Other pay-TV service provider:

- ABNXcess
- Astro
- U Television (formerly known as MiTV)
- Unifi TV
- MYTV Broadcasting
