= Astro Fibre =

Malaysian television service

Astro IPTV is an Internet Protocol Television service by the Malaysian satellite television provider Astro. Launched on 20 April 2011 as Astro B.yond IPTV, its subscribers were entitled to high definition Astro channels, personal video recording, video-on-demand, high-speed internet, and voice services. Astro's initial target audience were residences of high-rise buildings who previously had difficulty accessing HDTV services. This was made possible by partnering with Maxis Berhad in April 2013. Astro B.yond IPTV was rebranded to Astro IPTV in February 2014. In 2019, Astro IPTV was rebranded again to Astro & Broadband, and in 2022, Astro & Broadband changed its name to Astro Fibre.

== Broadband providers ==
=== TIME ===
When Astro IPTV was launched in April 2011, Astro Berhad initially partnered with TIME broadband for its fibre broadband services. The offered broadband speeds were 3 Mbit/s, 10 Mbit/s, 20 Mbit/s, and 30 Mbit/s. However, TIME broadband services are limited to a certain areas around Malaysia only.

=== Maxis ===
In April 2013, Astro partnered with Maxis Berhad. With this new partnership, more than 1 million households in Malaysia were able to get Astro IPTV services. Maxis offers 10 Mbit/s, 20 Mbit/s, and 30 Mbit/s for Astro IPTV subscribers. Before partnering with Astro, Maxis launched their own IPTV service. This was in partnership with 14 content providers including Radio Televisyen Malaysia (RTM), All Asia Multimedia Networks FZ-LLC, and Media Prima Berhad.
