= Digital television in Malaysia =

In Malaysia, digital television (DTV) broadcasts—whether high-definition (HD) or standard—can be received via cable, internet, satellite, or free over-the-air (OTA) digital terrestrial television, replacing analogue broadcasts. The transition began in the mid-1990s with the introduction of the Astro satellite television service, followed by new pay television services in the 2000s and the digitisation of over-the-air TV, which was originally expected to be complete by the mid-2010s before being delayed.

This article covers the various platforms used for DTV in Malaysia, including Digital Video Broadcasting (DVB)—using DVB-S/DVB-S2 for satellite and DVB-T2 for over-the-air—and Internet Protocol Television (IPTV). Following the successful nationwide digital transition on 31 October 2019, Malaysia became the third country in Southeast Asia to implement digital broadcasts, after neighbouring Brunei and Singapore.

== DTV systems ==
=== Satellite television ===
The DTV era in Malaysia began with the introduction of the direct broadcast pay television service, Astro, in 1996 as part of the commercialisation of space. Astro transmits about 130 local and international TV channels in the MPEG-2 video format through the K_{u} band using the MEASAT satellite system's transponders, complying with the DVB-S standard. Astro's transmission is susceptible to rain fade, and complaints of service interruption during wet weather are common in Malaysia's tropical climate. In December 2011, the Malaysian government announced that a free satellite television service, NJOI, would be available to customers starting February 2012.

=== Digital terrestrial television ===
==== Free-to-air ====
In 2005, the Ministry of Information announced its plan to digitise nationwide free-to-air TV broadcasts, led by Radio Televisyen Malaysia (RTM). Trial broadcasts were conducted involving one thousand households in the Klang Valley from September 2006 to February 2007. According to then-Deputy Minister of Information Chia Kwang Chye, the trial received "very positive" feedback; he noted that "more than 60 percent said the quality of the signal ranged from good to better. Over 88 percent said the picture quality improved, while 70 percent said the sound quality was better".

Information Minister Datuk Ahmad Shabery Cheek anticipated that RTM would complete its digitisation in 2012 as part of a three-year restructuring process. It was expected that each household, once equipped with the necessary equipment—such as a set-top box, iDTV, or DHD set—would receive up to 19 channels. Seven of these were to fall under RTM, with the rest allocated to private broadcasters such as TV3, ntv7, 8TV, and TV9. In addition to simulcasting TV1 and TV2, RTM aired RTMi, Muzik Aktif, and Arena exclusively on the digital TV platform, testing on UHF channel 44 modulated at 64QAM. RTM also planned to launch regional channels for each state and territory in Malaysia, increasing the total to 20 television channels. Media Prima began trials in March 2009.

Malaysia and all other Association of Southeast Asian Nations (ASEAN) members—except the Philippines (which selected ISDB-T) and Cambodia and Laos (which selected DTMB)—selected DVB-T as the final DTV standard. They expected to switch off analogue broadcasts completely by 2015. In June 2008, participants of the 6th ASEAN Digital Broadcast Meeting, comprising seven Southeast Asian countries including Malaysia, agreed to finalise the specifications of the DTV set-top box for use within ASEAN and to set up an ASEAN HD Centre to provide training on HDTV content to regional broadcasters.

Despite the success of RTM's pilot trials, the digital terrestrial television transition faced several issues. These problems stemmed from content providers' lack of enthusiasm toward digitisation—with the exception of Les' Copaque—and the need to improve the nation's Internet broadband infrastructure. After Abdullah Badawi resigned as Prime Minister in 2008, the RTM project was deferred indefinitely.

==== Future ====
Although Telekom Malaysia (TM) was rumoured to be building a digital terrestrial television infrastructure, TM focused on improving the broadband infrastructure to increase the country's internet readiness, which led to the creation of Unifi.

On 8 January 2014, Puncak Semangat was awarded the concession for digital terrestrial television development. The company was obligated to develop the digital terrestrial television infrastructure, including a digital multimedia hub and a network of high, medium, and low-powered digital TV transmitters nationwide capable of carrying up to 45 standard-definition or 15 high-definition digital TV channels initially. Television and radio services were to be offered first; connected services (catch-up TV and video on demand), t-commerce (television commerce), and soft services (e-learning applications and SMS voting) would be delivered later via home broadband networks.

The first rollout was scheduled to start on 16 April 2015 (originally expected in the third quarter of 2014), using Puncak Semangat's "inside-out" rollout strategy. This strategy targeted rural areas for analogue switch-off first, followed by suburban and eventually urban areas, because free-to-air television benefits rural populations more than urban and suburban residents who already subscribe to pay television services like Astro and HyppTV. The rollout was scheduled to complete in 2017, covering 98% of Malaysia's population with a capacity of up to 80 television channels and between 30 and 40 radio stations.

Once the full digital platform was rolled out, analogue television broadcasts were to be terminated.

==== Analogue switch-off ====
Analogue TV broadcasts were originally scheduled to be shut down in stages, completing by 2014 as per ASEAN recommendations. The DTT migration plan was divided into three phases:

1. Phase I (2007–2013)
  - Analogue TV & DTT co-exist
  - Analogue TV shut down in stages
  - Vacating of other primary services (radar and LMS)
2. Phase II (2014–29 September 2019)
  - No analogue TV service
  - Vacating of DTT service using channels 56 and above
  - Vacating of LMS in band 477 MHz to 478 MHz
3. Phase III (30 September 2019 – 31 October 2019)
  - 100% DTT service using channels 5 to 12 and 21 to 54

Analogue television broadcasts were eventually rescheduled for 2017, but the transition was completed after the full rollout of the digital platform. The Malaysian Communications and Multimedia Commission (MCMC) announced in late September that the full digital transition would be completed on 31 October 2019, the date when analogue TV broadcasting for the remaining states of Sabah and Sarawak would end. The switchover in West Malaysia was fully completed on 1 October at 12:30 AM (UTC+8), while the final switchover in East Malaysia was completed on 31 October, also at 12:30 AM as scheduled. This marked the end of analogue television broadcasting in Malaysia, making it the third country in Southeast Asia, after Singapore and Brunei, to undergo a successful transition to digital television.

==== Paid terrestrial television ====
In 2006, U Television (formerly MiTV) was scheduled to roll out broadcast services in the H.264 video format according to DVB-T standards to achieve better picture quality and more efficient frequency bandwidth usage, after an earlier venture with an IPTV-over-UHF system failed.

=== Broadband and IPTV ===
DETV, a paid television provider owned by REDtone, provides television and video-on-demand services on the IPTV platform, targeting Chinese Malaysian audiences.

TM launched its IPTV services, branded as Hypp.TV, in the fourth quarter of 2009, having completed trials with 1,000 selected households in the Klang Valley, Penang, and Kulim, Kedah. The service began in March 2010. However, because the service is tied to TM's Unifi fibre-to-the-home service, availability remains limited to areas covered by the national fibre rollout.

=== Mobile television ===
Mobile television was introduced in Malaysia via video streaming services from mobile telecommunications providers such as Maxis and DiGi, available to users of mobile phones with 3G or similar technologies. Maxis TV offers more than 20 channels to Maxis 3G subscribers with compatible mobile phones. Maxis was also expected to roll out broadcast mobile TV services based on DVB-H.

U Mobile also provides broadcast mobile TV to users of selected 3G phones, also based on DVB-H.

In October 2008, Astro launched Astro Mobile TV, which currently provides 18 channels. All are mobile versions of existing Astro TV channels, including seven in-house channels. This service is available only to Maxis subscribers with compatible 2.5G or 3G handsets and does not replace Maxis TV cable television.

In 2012, HyppTV launched the HyppTV Everywhere service to counter the lack of fibre coverage. Initially available only to Unifi subscribers, the service was opened to the general public to compensate for limited Unifi coverage.

== HDTV ==
RTM initiated its first high-definition television (HDTV) trials in 2008 during the Beijing Olympic Games. RTM test-broadcast the opening and closing ceremonies and several events in HD.

In late 2009, Astro launched Astro B.yond, a combined personal video recorder and high-definition television service.

In July 2013, Media Prima group chief financial officer Mohamad Ariff Ibrahim announced that Media Prima would launch a high definition (HD) simulcast for one of its four terrestrial television stations as early as the first half of 2014. However, viewers continued to experience SD resolution and stretched 4:3 aspect ratios, despite the prevalence of 16:9 television sets. Media Prima began broadcasting selected programmes in 16:9 SD on 31 December 2016. However, idents, programme previews, advertisements, legacy 4:3 content, and some widescreen programmes remained in 4:3 or were improperly stretched (sometimes letterboxed).

In early 2015, NJOI introduced an HD service, which became automatically available to all NJOI customers at no additional cost on 1 February.

== See also ==
- Digital television transition
- Television in Malaysia
