= QAF Brunei =

Investment company in Brunei

- Company type: Private
- Industry: Conglomerate
- Founded: December 1982; 43 years ago
- Headquarters: QAF Centre, Lot 65-66, Perindustrial Beribi II, Bandar Seri Begawan BE1118, Brunei
- Key people: Chairman: Abdul Qawi; CEO: Albert Lau
- Products: Food production, automotive sales, telecommunications, investments
- Owner: Prince Mohamed Bolkiah
- Parent: Baiduri Group
- Subsidiaries: Brunei Press Sdn Bhd; QAF Auto Sdn Bhd; QAF Prestige Sdn Bhd; QAF Farms Sdn Bhd
- Website: qaf-brunei.com.bn

QAF Brunei or QAF Brunei Group, (Note: Another moniker for QAF is "Royal Family, Inc.") is a private limited company under the Baiduri Group, owned by Prince Mohamed Bolkiah, serves as the investment company of the Bruneian royal family. Formerly known as QAF Holdings, the company has built a diverse portfolio spanning multiple sectors in Brunei. Initially founded as a car dealership focusing on the trade and leasing of luxury vehicles, QAF has since broadened its operations to include industrial machinery, fast food, media, supermarkets, and livestock production. With its expansion into China and Myanmar, QAF has become the third-largest employer in Brunei, behind the governmental sector and Brunei Shell Petroleum (BSP).

== History ==
In order to consolidate nearly 20 royal family-owned or joint venture businesses under one umbrella, (Note: These businesses span various sectors, including shipping, newspaper publishing, food manufacturing and retailing, automotive sales, and Brunei's oil industry.) QAF Holdings was founded in December 1982 as an investment fund. Part of a larger plan to diversify the country's interests, which had previously been focused on pounds sterling, QAF was first offered to the Singapore stock market in 1984, thus becoming a public company. The necessity to diversify Brunei's economy away from hydrocarbons, particularly in light of the volatile price of oil, drove this action. QAF's founding was crucial to the country's attempts to diversify its investments and ensure financial stability, which were subsequently aided by the foundation of the Brunei Investment Agency (BIA) to oversee sizeable national assets.

QAF Holdings emerged as Brunei's premier company during a period of significant financial restructuring and diversification efforts in the late 1980s. Following the bankruptcy of the National Bank of Brunei in 1986, QAF faced financial difficulties, prompting a focus on tightening financial regulations. The BIA took over the management of funds previously controlled by British Crown agents, marking a shift in investment strategy. To promote economic diversification, Prince Jefri Bolkiah was appointed Minister of Finance and head of the BIA in 1986, overseeing initiatives that included the establishment of the Institute of Technology Brunei and the Ministry of Industry and Primary Resources in 1988 to foster manufacturing development. On 15 January 1987, Pengiran Muhammad Yusuf resigned as director and chairman of QAF due to health reasons, and was succeeded by Pengiran Anak Ja'afar; Pengiran Anak Fatimah also resigned as director, with T. T. Durai and Goh Yong Kheng appointed in her place.

On 3 July 1990, QAF appointed Didi Dawis as chairman and Pengiran Muhammad Yusuf as deputy chairman, following the resignation of Pengiran Anak Ja'afar as chairman and director of QAF and its subsidiary companies. Prince Mohamed Bolkiah (Note: A source noted that it was bought by his son, Pengiran Muda Abdul Qawi.) bought his 65% ownership in QAF Holdings in the early 1990s, making it the third-largest employer in Brunei behind the government and BSP. In order to create 2,000 industrial projects and 40,000 employment by the year 2000, Brunei sought to draw B$2 billion in foreign direct investments outside the hydrocarbons industry during this time. The Brunei Oil and Gas Authority was founded in 1993 to help achieve this objective, and in 1994 a one-stop investment center was formed to help with possible investments. On 1 June 1993, Phillip Lee, CEO of Ben Foods, was appointed group marketing director of QAF, succeeding Paul Yap, who resigned from QAF and as non-executive director of the Gardenia companies in Singapore, Malaysia, and Thailand. By 1997, Prince Mohamed Bolkiah owned approximately 65% of the firm. In late June, speculation arose in Brunei about a potential repeat of the 1998 collapse of Prince Jefri Bolkiah's Amedeo Development Corporation conglomerate following the announcement that seven senior executives at the QAF Group, would be resigning due to disappointing earnings. As a consequence, Baiduri Bank, the then-subsidiary of QAF, was inundated with depositors looking to withdraw their funds, as reported by Asiaweek.

As of 1997, QAF holds stakes in numerous companies, such as Brunei Oxygen (industrial gases), Q-Carrier (air-conditioners), QAF-Solus (offshore rig services), and QAF-Reading and Bates (offshore drilling). It also has interests in Dairy Farm (catering), Singapore Emporium Holdings (retail), and Boustead (automotive). QAF partners with multinationals like Carrier and British Oxygen, typically holding a 50% stake in joint ventures. To maintain growth in Brunei's small but affluent market, QAF pursued a strategy of unrelated diversification, expanding into telecommunications and IT infrastructure in 2003. The company offered electronic business solutions and data communication services, while continuing to operate in the various industries it had originally ventured into. It set itself apart from more locally oriented businesses like the Adinin Group by expanding across several industries.

== Business ventures ==
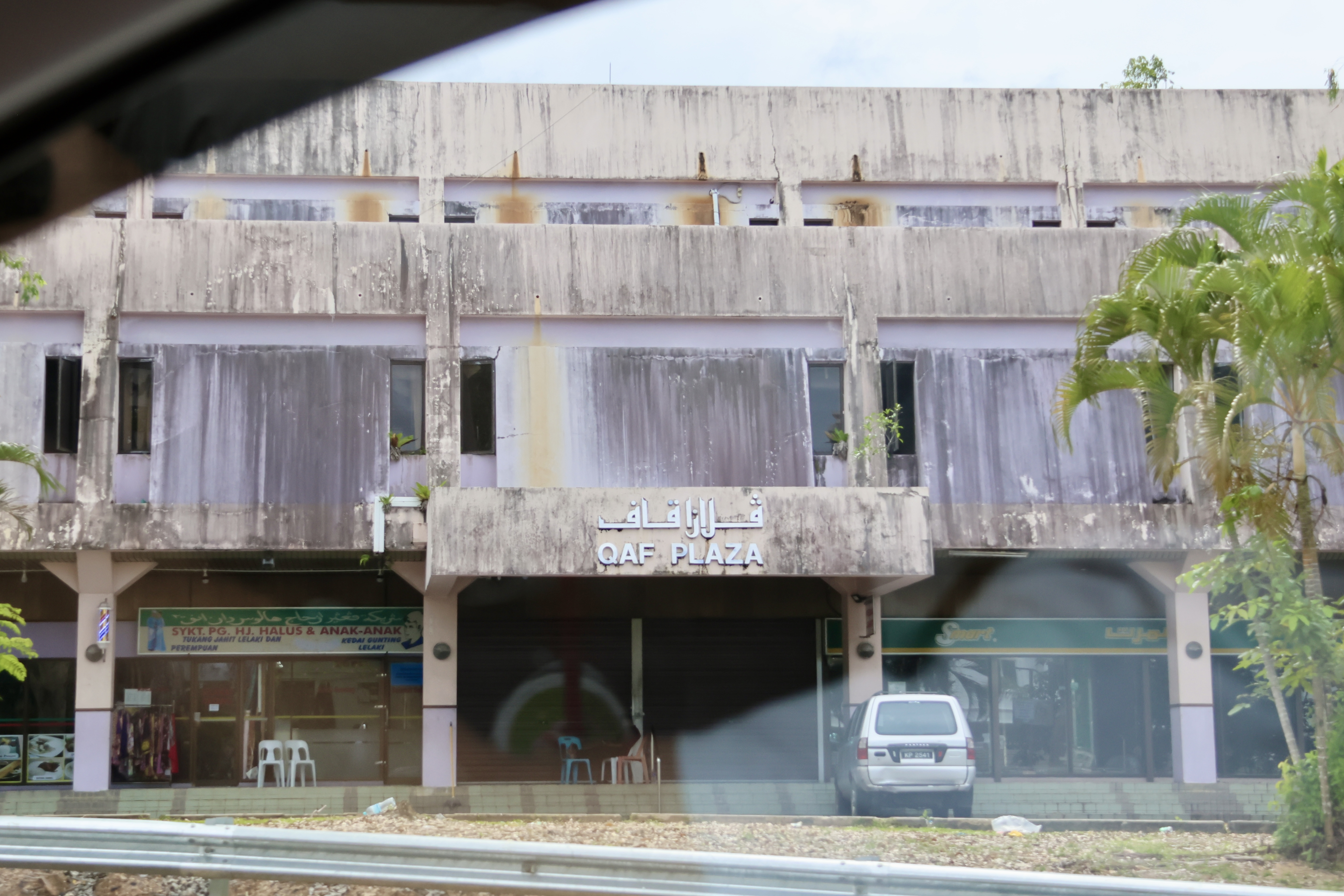
QAF Plaza Shopping Mall

On 28 August 2006, QAF Brunei, holding a 10% interest, partnered with Loon Brunei to form a consortium that successfully secured Block L, a vast area covering 2,253 square kilometres (870 sq mi) in eastern Brunei. After signing a production-sharing contract with PetroleumBRUNEI, QAF maintained its 10% stake, while Loon Brunei held 40%. Although parts of the block had been previously explored, much of the region remained untapped. A B$15.3 million seismic survey was planned for 2008. Later in 2006, Nations Petroleum became the operator of Block L, holding a 50% working interest, while Loon and QAF retained their respective stakes. Californian Nations Petroleum Brunei acquired half of block L's interests in March 2008. This suggested that QAF Brunei retained the remaining 10% of the shares in that block when Loon Energy, which had previously owned 90% of them, sold 50%.

=== Brunei Oxygen ===
Founded in 1962, Brunei Oxygen (Brunox) is a joint venture between QAF, BOC and Air Liquide. As the primary supplier of industrial gases in Brunei, Brunox serves critical industries such as healthcare, manufacturing, aviation, military, agriculture, scientific research, hospitality, and major oil and gas contractors. In addition to its core business of producing industrial gases, Brunox provides a variety of related equipment, services, and training programs. These offerings include the fabrication, installation, and commissioning of gas pipeline systems, along with onshore and offshore gas-related services and electrical welding and cutting equipment.

In 2018, Brunox inaugurated its first multi-million-dollar air separation plant in Kuala Belait. This facility is designed to produce 40 tonnes of liquefied oxygen, nitrogen, and argon, which will satisfy 60% of local demand and has the potential for regional exports. Previously, Brunox imported these gases for industrial applications, supplying oxygen for hospitals and construction, nitrogen for packaging and freezing in manufacturing, and argon for fire suppression systems. The decision to construct the plant was made in 2015, and it was completed in April 2018.

=== Brunei Press ===
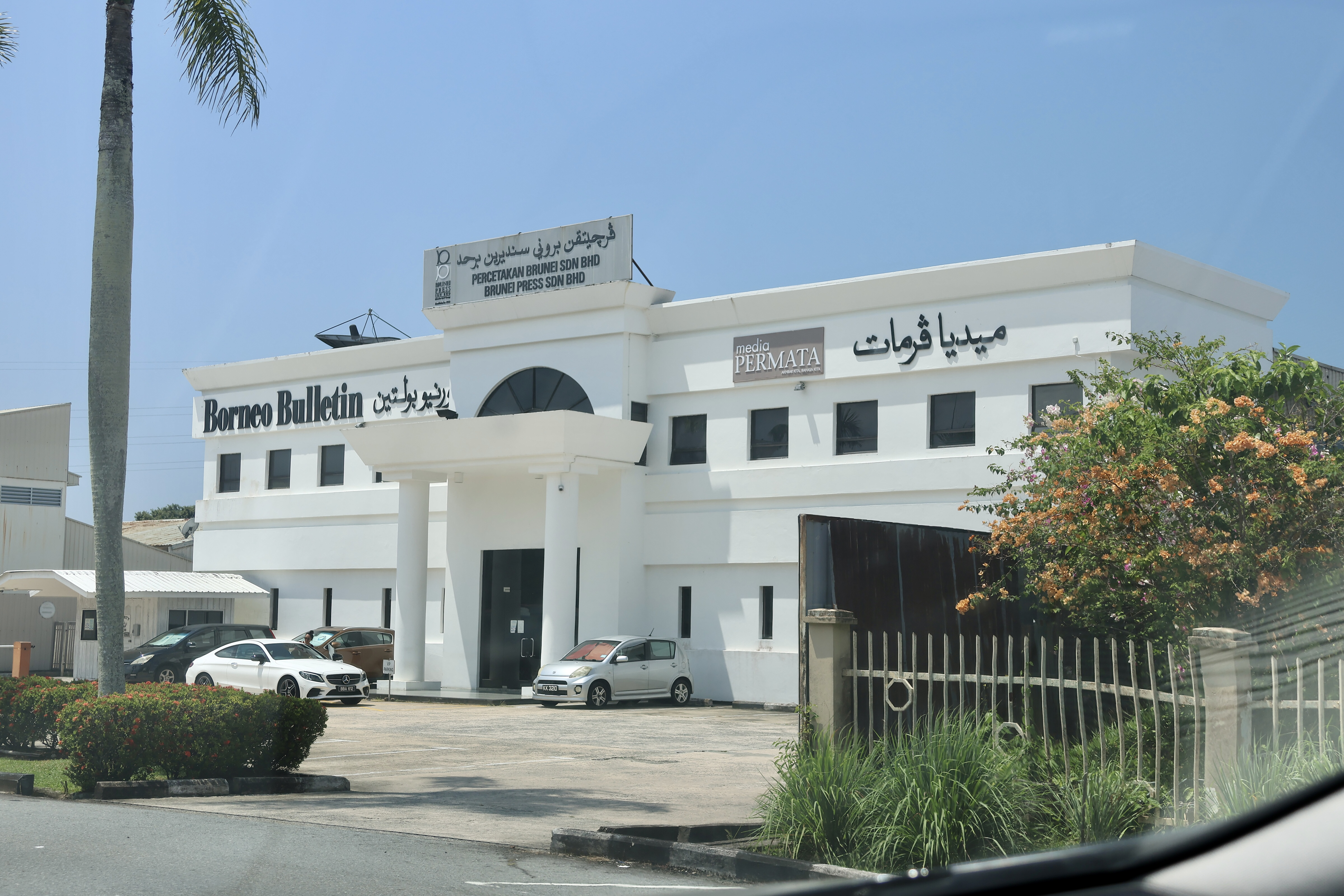
Headquarters of Brunei Press

Brunei Press Sdn Bhd, a division of QAF Brunei, publishes both the Borneo Bulletin and Media Permata. Originating as a weekly community newspaper for expats in 1953, the Borneo Bulletin became Brunei's top English-language daily in September 1990. Today, it reaches more than 100,000 readers daily. The sole Malay-language daily in Brunei, Media Permata was introduced by Brunei Press in 1995 and concentrates on local news for Malay readers. It boasts approximately 90,000 daily readers and bills itself as "Brunei Darussalam's Premier Daily Newspaper."

=== QAF Auto ===
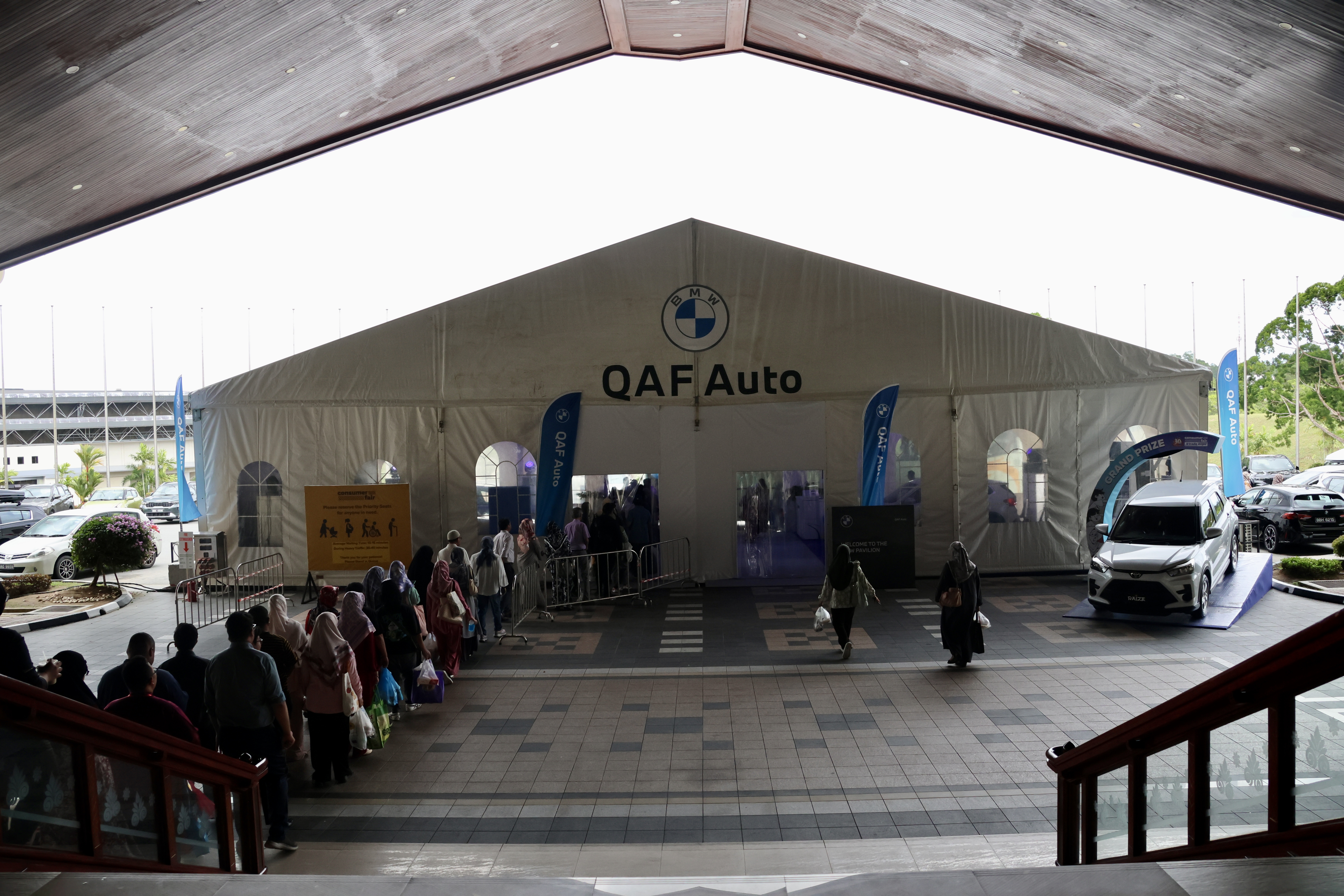
QAF Auto at the International Convention Centre

QAF Auto has served as the exclusive importer and distributor of BMW vehicles in Brunei since 1996, reintroducing the BMW brand in the country after acquiring the dealership in November of that year. On 1 February 1999, QAF Auto expanded its operations by acquiring a Rover distribution business along with its operating assets. In 2023, QAF Auto further enhanced its services by partnering with Brunei Shell Marketing to provide comprehensive support for BMW electric vehicle owners, including home charger assessments, installation services, and access to Shell Recharge charging points in Brunei.

=== QAF Farms ===
QAF Farms, a wholly owned subsidiary of QAF, commenced operations in June 2000 and features a hatchery and broiler farm located on 2 acres in Kampong Sungai Birau, Tutong. As of 2014, QAF Farms was a key player in Brunei Darussalam's poultry industry, producing 3,565 tonnes of chicken meat, which contributed to the country's high level of domestic poultry consumption. In 2013, local farmers met 97.1% of the total poultry consumption of 23,762 tonnes, with QAF Farms ranking among the top producers, alongside Soon Lee Farm, Ideal Multifeed Farm, Hua Ho Agriculture Farm, and Syarikat Kumpulan Harapan Baru.
