= Borneo Bulletin =

English-language daily newspaper in Brunei

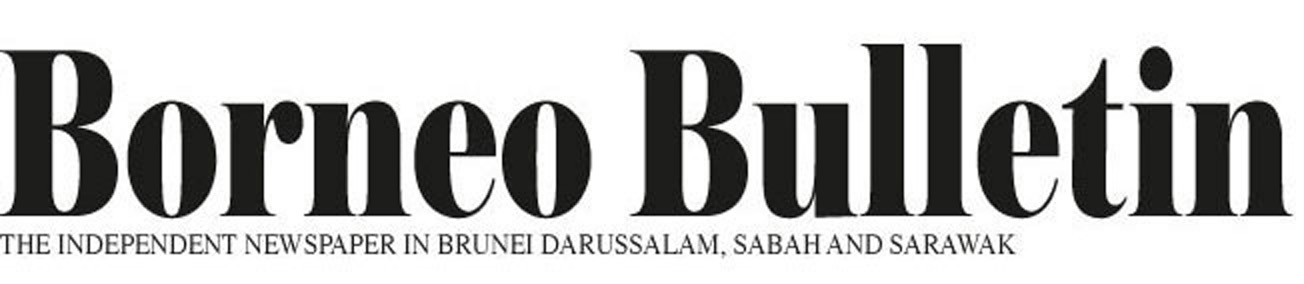

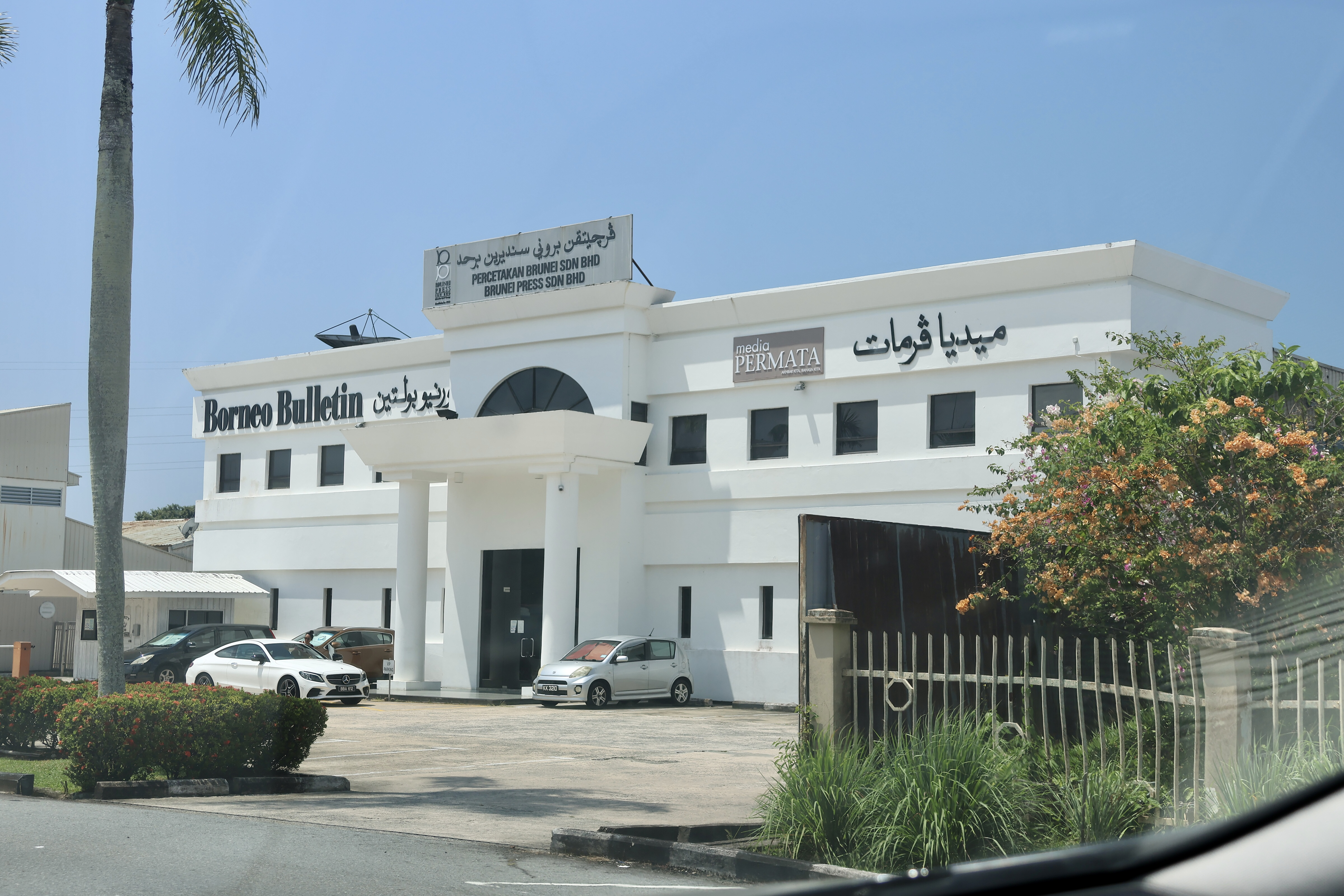
- Type: Daily newspaper
- Format: Tabloid
- Owner(s): QAF Brunei
- Founder(s): William Frederick Runagall; Geoffrey Weir Kerr
- Publisher: Brunei Press
- Founded: 1953
- Political alignment: Independent
- Headquarters: Beribi, Bandar Seri Begawan, Brunei
- Circulation: 20,000–25,000
- Website: borneobulletin.com.bn

The Borneo Bulletin is a daily English-language newspaper in Brunei. It is published by Brunei Press, which also publishes a Malay-language daily, Media Permata. The Bulletin circulates around 20,000 copies on weekdays and 25,000 copies on Saturday and Sunday. The Borneo Bulletin is a main source of information on local, regional and foreign affairs, as well as business news. Detailed stock market reports of the Singapore, Kuala Lumpur and regional stock exchanges are carried for the benefit of Bruneian businessmen and investors. In addition to the more serious news, the newspaper carries sports, lifestyle and leisure pages.

== History ==
The paper was first published in 1953 as a weekly community newspaper for expatriates in Brunei. Its founders were two Englishmen, William Frederick Runagall and Geoffrey Weir Kerr. Runagall left his publishing business in Singapore (The Craftsman Press) to set up the Brunei Press in Kuala Belait, Brunei. Kerr was at that time the Shell Oil Company information director based in Seria, Brunei. The Borneo Bulletin consisted of 12 pages and had a circulation of 3,500 copies. In 1959, the paper was sold to the Straits Times of Singapore. The paper was expanded over the years to include over 40 pages of content and advertising. It was published on a Friday.

In 1985, Brunei's first public-listed company, QAF Brunei, took over part of the shares of Brunei Press from the Straits Times. In September 1990, QAF acquired full ownership and the Borneo Bulletin became a daily (Monday - Saturday) paper. In 1991, it added its Sunday edition and thus became a true daily paper.

The paper launched an online version in the mid-1990s. Quite a few articles are available for free, but the ability to read past issues of the newspaper is hidden behind a subscription paywall.

== Contents and sections ==
There are seven main sections to the newspaper - Local News, Borneo News, Regional News, World News, Financial, Classified and Sports. With the exception of local news and some Borneo news, most of the other sections contains reports from other international news services. International news services used include Reuters, Associated Press (AP), Agence France Presse (AFP) Deutsche Presse-Agentur (dpa), Xinhua, Bernama, The Guardian, The Washington Post and Los Angeles Times. There are occasional analysis and special reports covering a wide array of topics which are mostly obtained from overseas news services. The newspaper practices self-censorship in its choice of topics to avoid angering the Brunei government.

However, letters to the editor often included comments critical of the government's handling of certain social, economic, and environmental issues. On occasion the government responded to public opinion on topics concerning social or environmental problems.

The Borneo Bulletin is controlled by the sultan’s family and typically engages in self-censorship to avoid provoking the government, although it occasionally publishes letters to the editor that criticize government policies.

== See also ==
- Media of Brunei
