= Rewind Networks =

Singaporean media company

Rewind Networks Pte. Ltd.
- Type: Private
- Industry: Mass media
- Founded: 2013; 13 years ago
- Headquarters: Singapore
- Area served: Southeast Asia
- Products: Television production Television channels
- Brands: HITS; HITS Movies; HITS Now
- Website: www.rewindnetworks.com

HITS
- Type: Pay television networks
- Broadcast area: Hong Kong; Southeast Asia
- Headquarters: Singapore

Programming
- Language: English
- Picture format: 1080i HDTV

Ownership
- Owner: Rewind Networks Pte Ltd

History
- Launched: HITS: 2013; 13 years ago HITS Movies: March 2018; 8 years ago HITS Now: 6 February 2023; 3 years ago

Links
- Website: HITS: hitstv.com HITS Movies: hitsmovies.tv HITS Now: hitsnow.tv

Rewind Networks Private Limited is a Singaporean media company. The company owns three linear television channels: HITS, HITS Movies, and HITS Now.

== History ==
Rewind Networks was established in 2013 with the launch of its first channel, HITS, on 9 December, beginning on StarHub TV in Singapore. Its launch was made to counter the rise in piracy in the region. An on-demand service, HITS Now, was announced for a 2014 launch.

The company announced its second channel, HITS Movies, in March 2018. It focused on feature films. Its launch slate consisted of movies from the 1960s to the 2000s. The channel launched on 1 October 2018, initially only on StarHub.

HITS and HITS Movies were added to Hong Kong Cable TV in the wake of the shutdown of most Disney-owned channels on 1 October 2021. On 16 November, the main HITS channel was added to LG U+.

On 6 February 2023, HITS Now launched as an SVOD platform and as a linear pay TV channel, on Singtel (through Singtel TV) in Singapore, Cignal TV in the Philippines and First Media and IndiHome in Indonesia. The new channel carries award shows, reality/talent competitions and recent US series.
