= Bloomberg TV Malaysia =

Malaysian 24-hour English business news channel

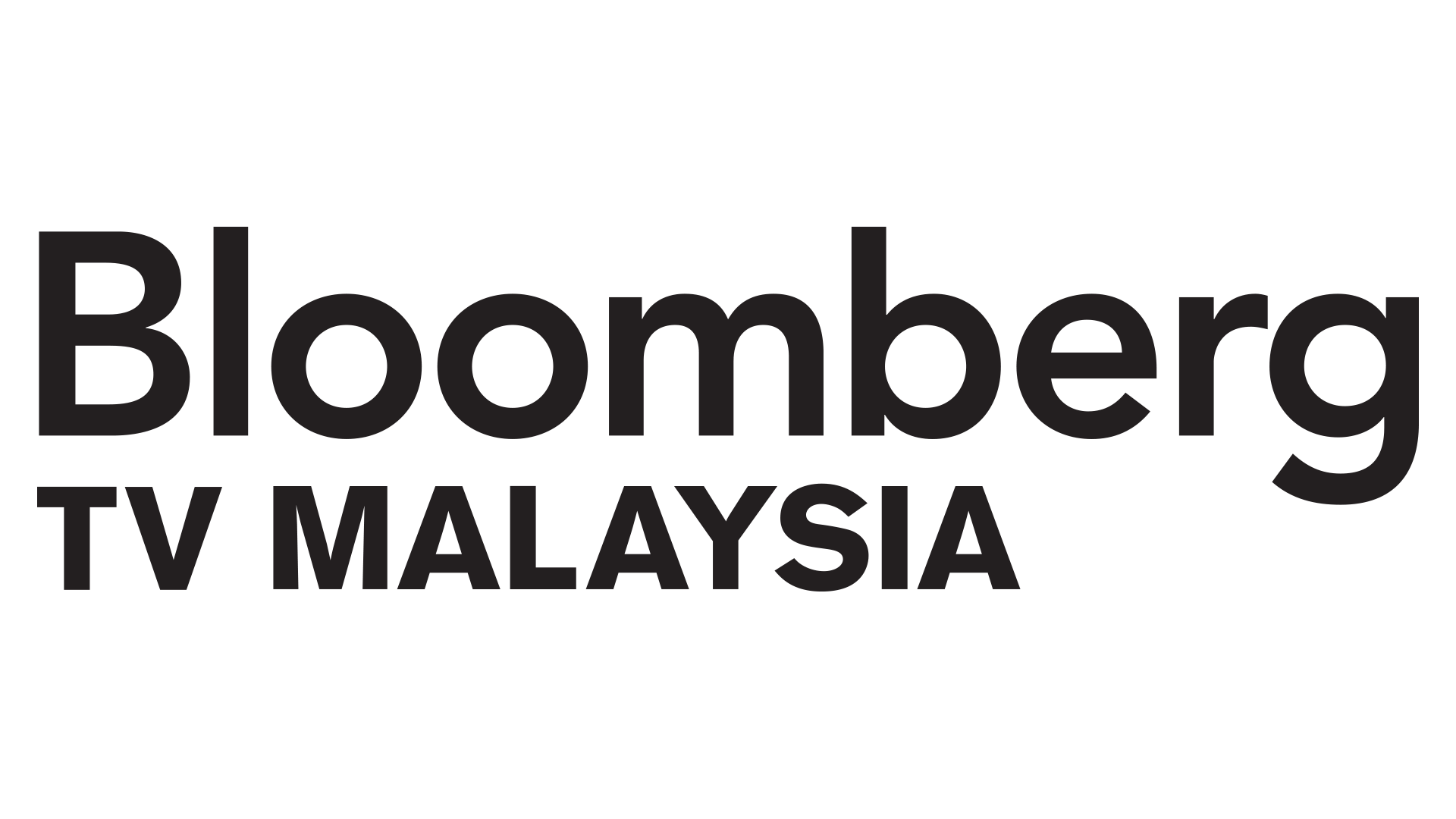
- Country: Malaysia
- Headquarters: No S-48-1, Jalan PJU 5/22, The Strand Encorp, Pusat Perdagangan Kota Damansara, Kota Damansara PJU 5, 47810 Petaling Jaya, Selangor Darul Ehsan, Malaysia.

Programming
- Languages: Malay, English

Ownership
- Owner: Enmedia Ventures Sdn. Bhd.

History
- Launched: 11 April 2015

Bloomberg TV Malaysia is 24-hour Malaysia's first business news channel in English. Launched on April 11, 2015, it is owned by Enmedia Ventures Sdn Bhd, chaired by Malaysian businessman Tan Sri Mohd Effendi Norwawi (former owner of NTV7) and helmed by media industry veteran Michael Chan.

The operations are located in Kota Damansara with a broadcast facility. Bloomberg TV Malaysia's newsroom is supported by the Bloomberg Network to provide business news with a Malaysian perspective. The channel is accessible on multiple platforms, providing live TV streaming. It currently airs two shows on weekdays, 'Dashboard' at 1pm and ‘Moving Malaysia’ at 6pm.

== Platforms ==
Bloomberg TV Malaysia is made available on multiple platforms. The channel is available on Astro Channel 517, Malaysia's largest pay TV service provider. The channel provides user mobility to access LIVE TV as well as content through the Bloomberg TV Malaysia mobile app or on its official website.

== Programming ==
Bloomberg TV Malaysia's programs and content cover business, financial, and economic news stories from Malaysia and around the world. But in July 2016, it went off air after its broadcasting from Astro was ended.

No.	Program	Platform
1.	Moving Malaysia	TV & Digital
2.	Dashboard	TV & Digital
3.	Market Check (Morning, Midday, Afternoon, Evening)	TV & Digital
4.	Feature Stories	Digital
5.	Business Focused Video Clips	Digital
6.	Business Features	Digital
