= Astro B.yond =

Malaysian high-definition television service

- Product type: Pay high-definition television service
- Produced by: Astro
- Introduced: 11 December 2009; 16 years ago
- Discontinued: March 2021; 5 years ago
- Website: www.astro.com.my

Astro B.yond was a Malaysian first high-definition television (HDTV) service from Astro. Launched by Astro on 11 December 2009. The roll out of these services is estimated to cost some RM200 million, including marketing and operating costs of approximately RM150 million, over the next financial year, ahead of revenue and earnings from these services.

Astro B.yond also introduced a Digital Video Recording (DVR) service, available through the Astro B.yond Personal Video Recorder (PVR) and an external hard disk drive connected to the Astro B.yond decoder. The Astro B.yond PVR comes with an inbuilt 500GB hard disk and allows customers to record up to two live programmes at the same time, rewind and pause live TV. Recording services is also available through Astro B.yond via a compatible external hard disk drive and activation of the recording service by Astro.

== History ==
On 14 July 2010, Samsung and Astro bring high-definition (HD) viewing experience into Malaysian homes. The latest Astro B.yond PVR box is a rebranded Samsung GX-AS731SK.

In April 2011, Astro B.yond introduced its Internet Protocol television (IPTV) services through a collaboration with Maxis Berhad to deliver IPTV. Since December 2010, this provides a wide choice of Astro channels in HD with personal video recording and video on demand (VOD) services delivered via Maxis fibre broadband. Astro B.yond IPTV will be progressively available in Klang Valley and Penang. At present, the Astro B.yond IPTV is available at 60 high-rise condominiums within Mont Kiara, KLCC, Bangsar and Penang.

The service also offered HD package, which is mandatory to subscribe to watch HD channels. All HD channels were initially included in their own packages before Astro started offering Family HD Pack channels in 2013.

In March 2021, Astro B.yond is no longer offered to new Astro customers and were replaced with Astro Ulti Box. Old customers however can still continue to use Astro B.yond however they are highly recommended to upgrade to Astro Ulti Box or Ultra Box for 4K UHD.

Astro had announced that it would discontinue the On Demand service for Astro B.yond on 31 December 2025, in October 2025.

== See also ==
- Television in Malaysia
- Digital television in Malaysia
