= ABNXcess =

Malaysian cable television company

Asian Broadcasting Network (M) Sdn Bhd
- Company type: Subsidiary
- Industry: Broadcasting, media
- Founded: 8 June 2013; 13 years ago
- Defunct: 2016
- Headquarters: Puchong, Selangor
- Area served: Malaysia
- Key people: Sreedhar Subramaniam (President & CEO); Tan Sri K.K. Eswaran
- Products: IPTV; Internet TV
- Parent: ABN Media Group
- Website: abnxcess.com (inactive)

Asian Broadcasting Network (M) Sdn Bhd, DBA ABNxcess, was the sole digital cable television operator in Malaysia, launched on 8 June 2013. The company offered cable television services via the cable network which had been in operation since 2012.

ABNxcess was owned and operated by Asian Broadcasting Network (M) Sdn Bhd, a wholly owned subsidiary of The ABN Media Group. It had operations at Pusat Perniagaan Suria Puchong located in Puchong, Selangor, Malaysia. In 2016, the company ceased its operations.

== Financial crisis ==
For financial year 2013, ABNxcess's accumulated losses stood at RM36.2 million, including a loss of RM30.7 million for the year. As of 2015, the company had not filed its financial results for the last two years, and it had loan facilities totalling RM465 million.

== See also ==
- Television in Malaysia
- Digital television in Malaysia
