= Progresif =

Brunei telecommunications company

Progresif Sdn Bhd
- Type: Government-linked company (Private)
- Industry: Telecommunications
- Predecessor: B-Mobile
- Founded: July 1, 2014; 12 years ago (as Progresif Cellular); August 21, 2019 (as Progresif Sdn Bhd)
- Founder: Darussalam Assets (via Ministry of Finance and Economy)
- Headquarters: Bandar Seri Begawan, Brunei
- Area served: Nationwide
- Key people: Hajah Nurul Haniah binti Haji Md Jaafar (CEO); Johan bin Dato Dr Hj Johar (SVP Strategy); Adi Basri (CCIO)
- Products: Mobile telephony, Broadband, Mobile payment (Ding!), Digital media
- Services: 4G+, 5G, Fiber Broadband, Fintech
- Revenue: ▲ B$62 million (est.)
- Owner: Darussalam Assets (100%)
- Number of employees: 130+
- Subsidiaries: Progresif Media, Progresif Minds
- Website: www.progresif.com

Progresif Sendirian Berhad, (formerly known as Progresif Cellular Sendirian Berhad), is a Brunei-based government-linked company headquartered in Bandar Seri Begawan, Brunei. Founded in 2014, it now has more than 130 employees and around 200,000 customers, with eight retail stores throughout the kingdom.

== History ==
Progresif was established in June 2014 after acquiring assets and infrastructure left by the now defunct B-Mobile Communications Sdn Bhd.

In July 2014, Progresif appointed Paul Hyde as chief executive officer, and entered into an $18 million contract with Chinese multinational telecommunications equipment provider Huawei to help update legacy infrastructure and launch a network stabilisation program. This project required a full replacement of the mobile core network and Radio Access Network, in addition to upgrading the backhaul network and all base stations from 3G to HSPA+. In February 2016, the company announced plans to launch 4G LTE technology, and in April 2017, the company submitted an official request to Brunei's telecoms regulatory body, Authority for Info-Communications Technology Industry (AITI), to begin trial of a 4G network.

In June 2017, telecom industry veteran Paul Taylor was named as CEO of the company. In October 2017, Progresif relaunched the company website, adding significant content in the areas of news, local events, and technology, as well as content from the company's quarterly magazine, and articles on the arts & culture, environment, education, and entrepreneurship.

After the formation of Unified National Network (UNN), Progresif relaunched their products and services in January 2020. At the same time, Hjh Nurul Haniah binti Hj Md Jaafar was internally promoted to the position of chief executive officer.

== Enterprise solutions ==
In 2017, Progresif launched Progresif Solutions, a division devoted to enterprise integration, particularly for business, banking, and government entities. The first execution was for a subsidiary of Hong Kong Tianyi International Holding Co., Ltd., for a project site in Pulau Muara Besar and company headquarters at the Empire Hotel & Country Club.

== Internet radio and magazine ==
Progresif launched Progresif Radio, Brunei's first mobile radio station, in November 2017, with dedicated apps available in Google Play and the App store. The station features localized content, user-generated content, and local bands, as well as premium international content.

== Progresif PAY mobile wallet ==
In May 2018, Progresif (partnered with Bank Islam Brunei Darussalam) released Brunei's first mobile wallet platform. The branchless banking system allows Progresif subscribers to create a virtual debit card, with which they can pay bills, make donations, send money to other Progresif PAY users, and shop online.

== Retail branches ==
Progresif has five retail stores located around Brunei:

- Progresif Brunei International Airport Store, Berakas
- Progresif The Mall Store, Gadong
- Progresif Times Square Shopping Complex, Berakas
- Progresif Tutong Store, Tutong
- Progresif Yayasan Store, Bandar Seri Begawan
