= Media Permata =

Malay-language daily newspaper in Brunei

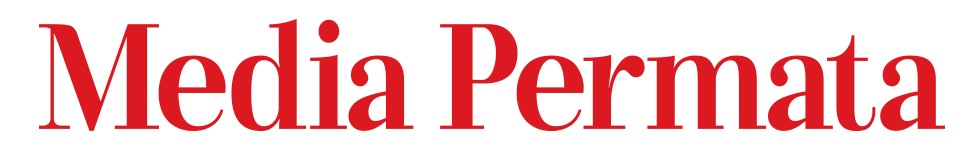
- Type: daily newspaper
- Format: print, online
- Owner(s): Sultan Hassanal Bolkiah
- Publisher: Brunei Press Sdn Bhd.
- Founded: 1959; 66 years ago
- Political alignment: pro-government
- Language: Malay
- Headquarters: Bandar Seri Begawan
- Country: Brunei Darussalam
- Sister newspapers: Borneo Bulletin
- Website: mediapermata.com.bn

Media Permata is a Malay-language daily newspaper published Monday to Saturday in Brunei Darussalam by Brunei Press Sdn Bhd, which also publishes the Borneo Bulletin. The Saturday edition of Media Permata features a special 16-page pull out called Suasana, which offers lifestyle and entertainment news.

== See also ==
- Mass media in Brunei
- Radio Television Brunei
