= U Television =

Malaysian pay television operator

Ansat Broadcast
- Formerly: MiTV
- Founded: 5 September 2005; 20 years ago
- Owner: Berjaya Media Berhad

Ansat Broadcast Sdn. Bhd. (formerly known as U Television, with MiTV being an abbreviation of its former name, Malaysian Interactive Television) is Malaysia's third pay television operator. It was launched on 5 September 2005, after having obtained all the necessary approvals from the censorship board on its broadcast contents. The company initially offered 41 channels from content providers worldwide, with many of them new to the Malaysian market.

== History ==
Set to end Astro's monopoly in the Malaysian pay TV market, MiTV originally planned to launch in December in June 2004, moving to October in July and the second quarter of 2005 in January 2005.

In August 2004, MiTV signed a deal to carry Channel News Asia in its platform.

In January 2005, MiTV planned to be listed in the Main Board of Bursa Malaysia.

MiTV was officially launched on 5 September 2005 by Malaysian Prime Minister Abdullah Ahmad Badawi, at the Manhattan Ballroom in Berjaya Times Square Hotel & Convention Centre in Kuala Lumpur.

One of Ansat Broadcast's distinguishing traits is that it uses an Internet Protocol over UHF-based transmission system. Subscribers are required to install a standard UHF television antenna as opposed to a satellite dish to receive broadcasts. Ansat Broadcast is therefore able to broadcast even during inclement weather.

Ansat Broadcast is largely owned by Tan Sri Vincent Tan, the president of the Berjaya Group.

On 31 October 2006, the company announced a restructuring that included suspension of all marketing and new subscription activities. In addition, approximately 66% of the companies workforce was retrenched.

Ansat Broadcast also owns a mobile phone operator called U Mobile.

In June 2007, Nokia and MiTV planned to launch DVB-H in "the second half of 2007" through the U Mobile network using a Nokia N77. Known as Mobile LiveTV, it carried seven channels in a package called Friendly User Program. The service was reportedly shut down in February 2009.

== See also ==
- List of Malaysian television stations
- Mega TV (non-operational since 2001)
- Fine TV
- Astro
- U Mobile
