= DST Group Building =

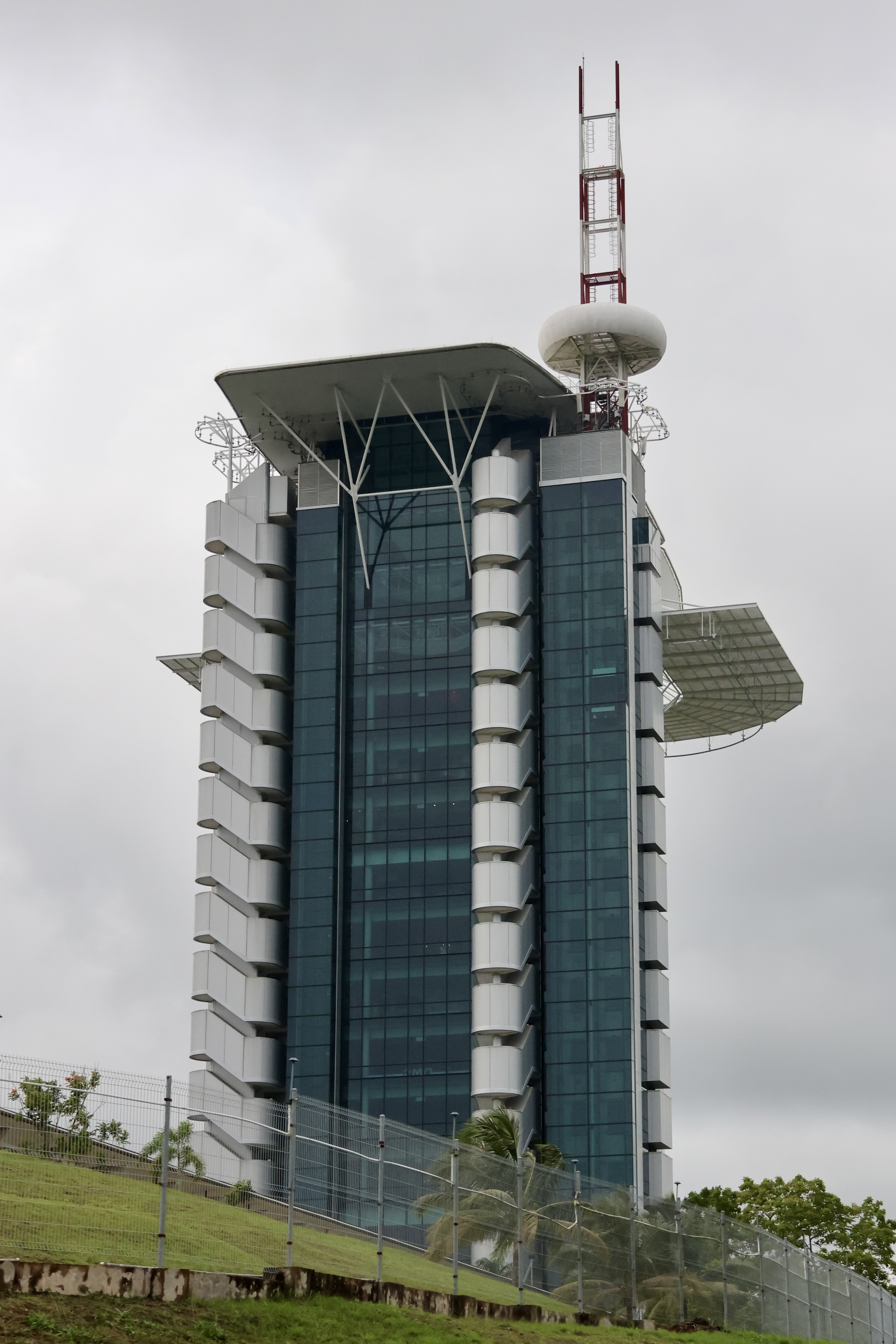
- The building in 2025
- Interactive map of the DST Group Building area

General information
- Status: Completed
- Type: Office, Shops, Communication, Recording Studio
- Location: Bandar Seri Begawan, Brunei
- Coordinates: 4.9656230°N 114.8850306°E
- Construction started: 1994
- Completed: 1995
- Opening: 1995
- Cost: US$84.8 million

Height
- Roof: 52.45 m (172.1 ft)

Technical details
- Floor count: 14

Design and construction
- Architect: Kohn Pedersen Fox
- Developer: Mori Building Co.
- Structural engineer: Leslie E. Robertson Associates RLLP

The DST Group Building, also known as the DST Tower, was constructed in 1994. It is one of the tallest buildings in Brunei. The building's only tenant is the DataStream Technology Group, a leading telecommunications provider in the country. The building houses offices, recording studios and an open-air sky lobby on the fifteenth floor.

== See also ==
- List of towers
