= Imagine (Brunei telecommunications company) =

Bruneian telecommunications company and provider

Imagine Sendirian Berhad
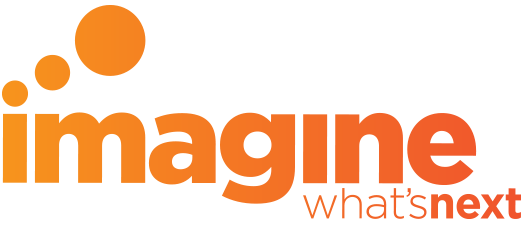
- Formerly: Telekom Brunei Berhad (30 May 2002–7 December 2019)
- Type: Private limited company
- Industry: Telecommunications
- Founded: Founded: 1952; 74 years ago (JTB); Corporatised: 30 May 2002; 24 years ago (TelBru)
- Founder: Government of Brunei
- Headquarters: Jalan Sultan Complex, Level 6, RB Plaza, Bandar Seri Begawan, Brunei BS8811
- Number of locations: 10 Branches
- Key people: Ahmad Fathi (ED); Radziman Rahman (SVP)
- Products: Broadband; Mobile; Bundles
- Services: Broadband; Mobile; Fixed line
- Owner: Darussalam Assets Sendirian Berhad (50% economic, 50% voting) (sale to Ooredoo pending)
- Subsidiaries: None
- Website: imagine.com.bn

Imagine Sendirian Berhad, (doing business as Imagine, stylized as imagine, formerly known as Telekom Brunei Berhad), is a Bruneian telecommunications company and provider that offers various services to the consumer and enterprise sectors, with its mainstay being high speed broadband (HSBB) and telephone services over fibre optics infrastructure. At present, the company offers a minimum bandwidth of 20 Mbit/s with several other packages that can reach speeds of 300 Mbit/s. Based on demand, TelBru also has the capability to provide 2.5 Gbit/s. The company also provides IT services for corporate as well as government clients.

== History ==
The company was incorporated as TelBru on 30 May 2002. It has been operated since April 2006 when the Department of Telekom Brunei (JTB) was corporatized on 1 April 2006. As of the end of 2017, the company employs more than 900 staff.

On 7 December 2019, Telbru officially announced their rebranding to imagine.

== Location and branches ==
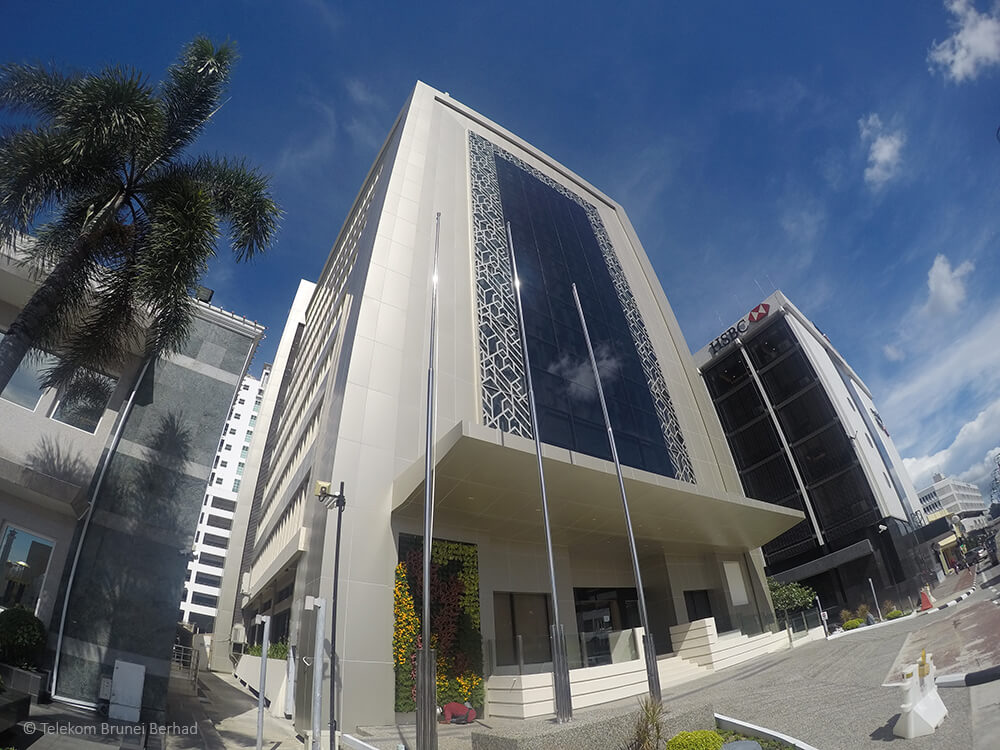
Imagine Headquarters - RB Plaza building

The company headquarters is located at 1st, 6th to 8th Floor of the RBA Plaza building and its infrastructure is managed by UNN, Bandar Seri Begawan.

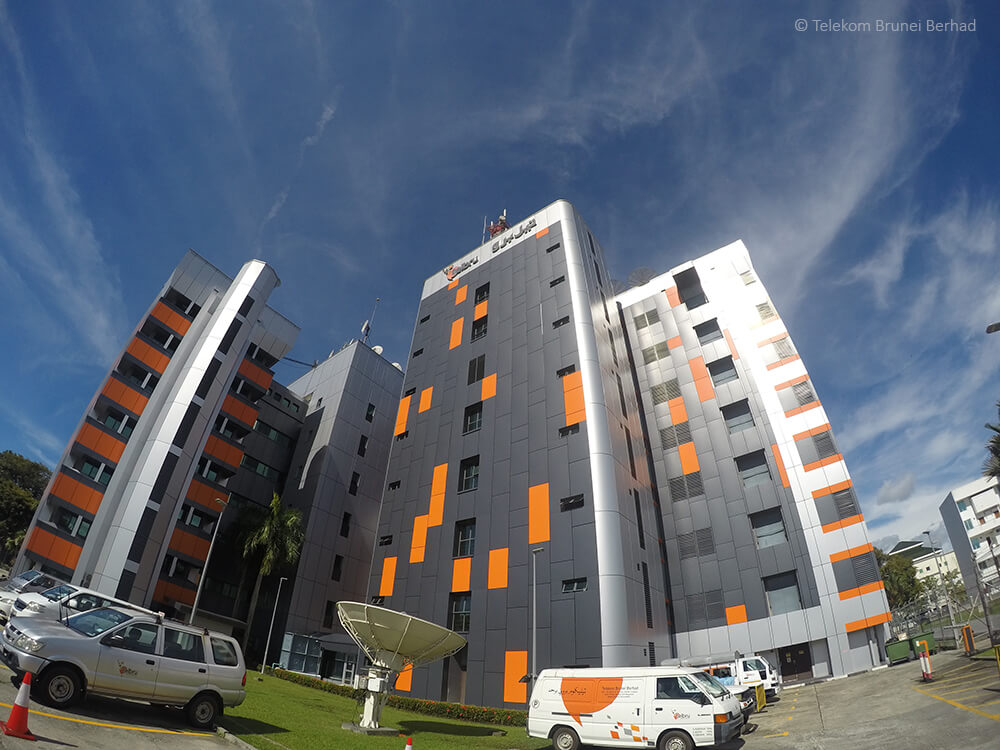
Former TelBru Operations Center - TelHouse Sumbiling, which is now under UNN

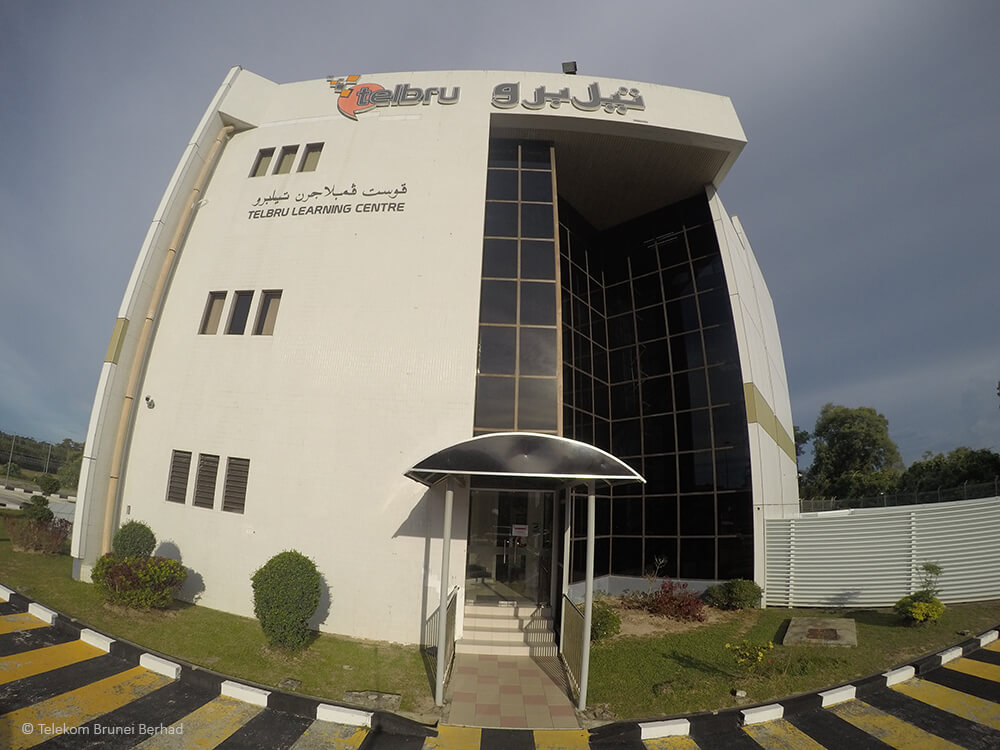
TelBru Learning Centre - TLC, which is now under UNN Digital Service Lab

The company has a total of 10 retail branches throughout the country.

Location of retail branches
District	No. of Branches
Brunei-Muara	7
Tutong	1
Kuala Belait	2
Temburong	1

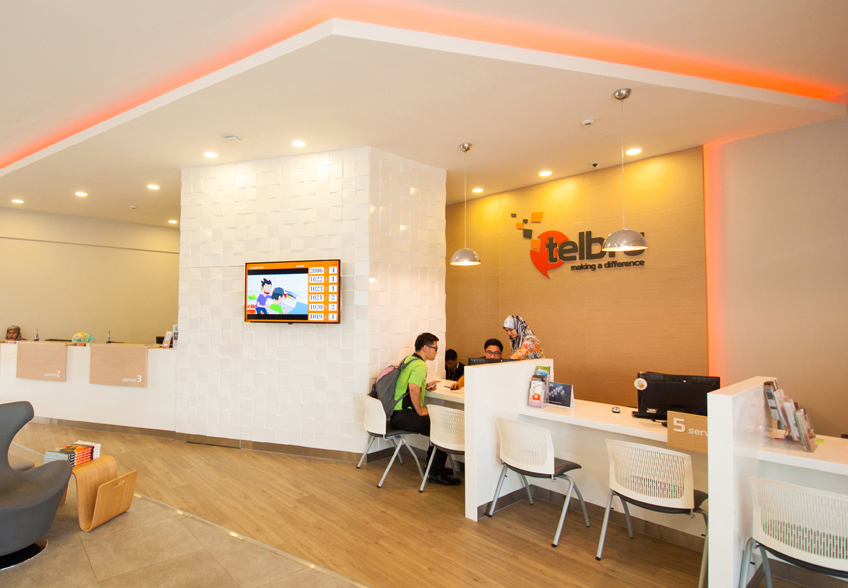
Former TelBru Branch located in Rimba (Brunei-Muara)

== Products and services ==
- High Speed Broadband (HSBB)
- Telephony services
- TelBru DMR
- Video conferencing
- e-Domain
- Lease line
- Global IP Transit
- International Bandwidth
- Premium Voice
- Wholesale Voice
- SMS Gateway
- Fixed Wireless
- Nationwide Wi-Fi

== Logo history ==
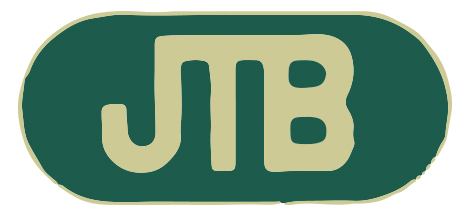
JTB logo (1952-2002)

TelBru logo (2002-2014)

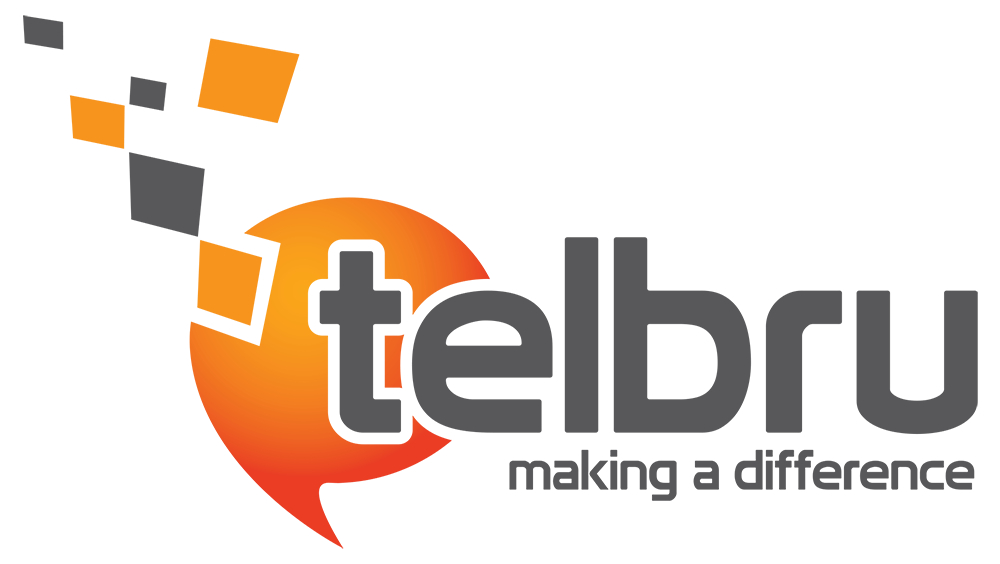
TelBru logo (2014-2019)

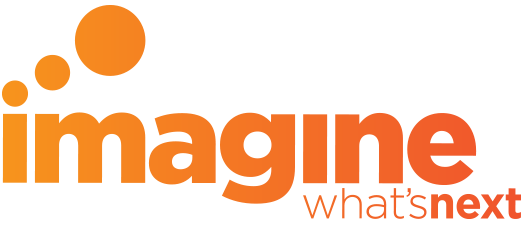
Imagine logo (2019–present)
