= List of assets owned by Media Prima =

This is a list of assets owned by Media Prima Berhad, a Malaysian media and entertainment conglomerate based in Balai Berita, Bangsar, Kuala Lumpur.

== Assets and subsidiaries ==
=== Media Prima Content & TV Networks ===
Media Prima owns and operates five free-to-air television channels, each of them functioning under their own branding and subsidiaries. TV3 and NTV7 were established long before Media Prima exist, while others, 8TV and TV9 were formed through the group's acquisition of defunct television companies.

Name	Company	Language	Notes	Ref.
TV3	Sistem Televisyen Malaysia Berhad	Malay and English	Launched on 1 June 1984. Both New Straits Times Press (Malaysia) Berhad and its owner company are the founding members of Media Prima.	
NTV7	Natseven TV Sdn Bhd	Malay	Launched on 7 April 1998 (as NTV7). Shifted to education channel on 17 February 2021 (as DidikTV KPM).	
8TV	Metropolitan TV Sdn Bhd	Chinese (Mandarin, Cantonese and Hokkien)	Launched on 1 July 1995 as MetroVision and ceased operations in 1999. Relaunched as 8TV on 8 January 2004.	
TV9	Ch-9 Media Sdn Bhd	Malay	Launched in September 2003 as Channel 9 and ceased operations in February 2005. Relaunched as TV9 on 1 April 2006.	
Drama Sangat	Skyten Marketing Sdn Bhd	Malay and Chinese (Mandarin)	Launched on 27 October 2017.	

Wow Shop is the group's teleshopping network. It was established on 22 February 2016 as CJ Wow Shop, a joint venture with Korean conglomerate CJ Group's subsidiary, CJ E&M. The teleshopping network became a fully owned subsidiary after the group bought CJ's remaining 49% stake. Apart from TV3, NTV7, 8TV, TV9 and Malaysia's No.1 edutainment channel, DidikTV KPM, Wow Shop is also available in two purpose-built channels on my Freeview. Tonton (formerly gua.com.my and later Catch Up TV) is the group's Over-the-top media service (OTT) which covers viewers across multiple devices such as computers, tablets, smartphones.

=== Media Prima Audio ===
Logo of Media Prima Audio

Media Prima Audio (formerly known as Media Prima Radio Networks and later Ripple Media or simply Ripple) is a radio broadcasting subsidiary of Media Prima. It includes five radio broadcast brands – Eight WuXian (formerly One FM, 8FM and Eight FM), Kool FM (briefly Buletin FM and Kool 101), Fly FM, Hot FM (formerly WOW.fm and WaFM), Molek FM and a podcast platform – Audio+ (formerly Ais Kacang). As of November 2021, based on the October 2021 Gfk Radio Survey, Media Prima Audio is the most popular radio network in Malaysia with over 5 million listeners and 57 million digital listeners since its rival, Astro Audio. However, Media Prima does not have Tamil-language radio stations, unlike Radio Televisyen Malaysia (RTM) and Astro.

Name	Company	Language	Notes	Ref.
Fly FM	Max-Airplay Sdn Bhd	English	Launched on 3 October 2005	
Hot FM	Synchrosound Studio Sdn Bhd	Malay	Launched on 6 February 2006	
Eight WuXian	One FM Radio Sdn Bhd	Chinese (Mandarin, Cantonese)	Launched on 19 January 2009	
Kool FM	Kool FM Radio Sdn Bhd	Malay	Launched on 1 March 2016	
Molek FM	Kool FM Radio Sdn Bhd	Malay	Launched on 1 January 2022	

=== New Straits Times Press ===
Media Prima owns more than 98% equity interest in the New Straits Times Press (Malaysia) Berhad (NSTP), which owns three of Malaysia's most recognised print and online news brands – namely its namesake the New Straits Times, Berita Harian and Harian Metro and their respective weekend editions as well as an online newspaper archive, KLiK. Apart from news brands, NSTP also owns printing subsidiary Print Towers Sdn Bhd, tertiary education reference website Mind Campus and learning portal FullAMark.

=== Out-of-home advertising ===
- Big Tree
  - Kurnia Outdoor
  - UPD
  - The Right Channel
  - Gotcha
  - Big Tree Seni Jaya

=== Production and distribution ===
- Primeworks Studios
- Alternate Records & Talents

=== REV Media Group ===
REV Media Group (formerly Alt Media and later Media Prima Digital) is a new media subsidiary of Media Prima which consists of the following brands:

- 8Coin (English)
- Audience Plus (English)
- IGN Southeast Asia (English)
- JUICE Online (English)
- Mashable Southeast Asia (English)
- Kongsi Resipi (Malay)
- My Game On (Malay)
- MyResipi (Malay)
- Oh Bulan! (Malay)
- Sirap Limau (Malay)
- Vocket (Malay)
- Rojaklah (Chinese)
- Tantan News (Chinese)
- Viral Cham (Chinese)
- SAYS (English and Malay)
- TechNave (English, Malay and Chinese)
- Tonton
- Tonton Xtra
- Media Prima Labs

=== Integrated Solution Provider ===
- Media Prima Omnia

=== Art gallery ===
- Galeri Prima

== Former assets ==
=== Divested ===
- Malaysia Institute of Integrative Media (formerly Akademi TV3; 1995–2003) - sold to SAL Group of Colleges in 2003
- MPB Primedia (Philippines; 2008–2009) - sold to MediaQuest Holdings in 2009
  - TV5 Network (formerly ABC Development Corporation; 1992–2015)
    - TV5 Philippines (formerly ABC/Associated Broadcasting Corporation/Company; 1960–1972, 1992–2008)
- TV3 Ghana (1997–2011) - sold to Media General Ghana Limited in 2011
- Berita Publishing – formerly part of the New Straits Times Press prior to Media Prima's establishment in 2002; sold to Alaf Positif in 2000 and ceased operations in 2015
- Malay Mail - sold to Redberry Media Group in 2012
- Asia Honour Paper Industries (formerly Malaysian Newspaper Industries; MNI) - sold to Asia Honour Hong Kong in 2020

=== Defunct or inactive ===
- Mega TV – Malaysia's first pay-TV service; ceased operations in 2001
- Ambang Klasik – formerly a subsidiary of TV3; ceased operations in 2002
- Emas – a pay TV channel that airs classic television programs from Media Prima archive; ceased broadcasting in 2014
- The 8 Unit (also known as Media Prima Talents) - Media Prima's talent agency; inactive since 2015
- Grand Brilliance – formerly a TV production unit of TV3 and later a wholly owned subsidiary of Media Prima; merged with Primeworks Studios in 2019 to create a new licensing, production and distribution company under the Primeworks Studios name.
