= 2017 SEA Games =

Multi-sport event in Malaysia

XXIX Southeast Asian Games
- Host city: Kuala Lumpur, Malaysia
- Motto: Rising Together (Malay: Bangkit Bersama)
- Nations: 11
- Athletes: 4,646
- Events: 404 in 38 sports
- Opening: 19 August 2017
- Closing: 30 August 2017
- Opened by: Muhammad V Yang di-Pertuan Agong
- Athlete's Oath: Nauraj Singh Randhawa
- Judge's Oath: Megat Zulkarnain Omardin
- Torch lighter: Nur Dhabitah Sabri
- Main venue: Bukit Jalil National Stadium
- Website: 2017 Southeast Asian Games at the Wayback Machine (archived 8 September 2017)

The 2017 Southeast Asian Games (Malay: Sukan Asia Tenggara 2017), officially known as the 29th Southeast Asian Games, or the 29th SEA Games, and commonly known as Kuala Lumpur 2017, were a Southeast Asian multi-sport event that took place from 19 to 30 August 2017 in Kuala Lumpur, Malaysia. This was the sixth time that Malaysia hosted the Games and its first time since 2001. Previously, it had also hosted the 1965, 1971, 1977 and 1989 editions of the Games. The 2017 edition is most notable for being the first edition to include winter sports.

The Games were held from 19 to 30 August 2017, although several events had commenced from 14 August 2017. Around 4,646 athletes participated at the event, which featured 404 events in 38 sports. It was opened by the King of Malaysia, Muhammad V at the Bukit Jalil National Stadium.

Hosts Malaysia led the final medal tally, followed by Thailand and Vietnam. Several games and national records were broken during the games.

== Host city ==
As per SEA Games traditions, hosting duties are rotated among the SEA Games Federation (SEAGF) member countries. Each country is assigned a year to host but may choose to do so or not.

== Host selection ==
In July 2012, the SEAGF meeting in Myanmar confirmed that Malaysia would host the regional biennial event in 2017, should there be no other country willing to bid for the host job. Olympic Council of Malaysia (OCM) secretary general Sieh Kok Chi, who attended the meeting, said that Myanmar would host the Games in 2013, followed by Singapore in 2015. It was to be Brunei's turn but it expressed its interest to host the 2019 Games instead of the 2017 edition and thus this resulted in Malaysia being chosen as the host for the 2017 Games.

== Development and preparation ==
The Malaysia SEA Games Organising Committee (MASOC) was formed in 2015 to oversee the staging of the event.

=== Costs ===
Sports Minister Khairy Jamaluddin in 2013 had hoped the cost of hosting the Games would not exceed MYR80 million (US$18 million). But in 2016, the government budgeted the cost to not exceed MYR500 million while during the 2017 budget, the prime minister, who was also the finance minister, announced a RM450 million budget for hosting the games.

In comparison, Singapore had spent about MYR740 million (SG$264 million, using the then SGD/MYR exchange rate of 2.80, as opposed to the current rate of 3.15) organising the Games in 2015 while Myanmar was estimated to have spent about MYR1 billion in 2013.

However, the accounts have not been made public as of March 2021.

=== Venues ===
The 2017 Southeast Asian Games was organised across several states in Malaysia. All the existing venues in Bukit Jalil National Sports Complex were upgraded while a new velodrome, costing MYR 80 million was built in Nilai, Negeri Sembilan to host track cycling events and was completed on late March 2017 and opened on 26 May 2017. Initially, Sabah and Sarawak were considered for a number of events contested. However, the chief executive officer of 2017 SEA Games, Zolkples Embong has decided not to involve the East Malaysian states, citing "higher cost" as the main reason for not involving.

More than RM1.6 billion has been allocated by the host country to turn the National Sports Complex in Bukit Jalil, Kuala Lumpur, and its surrounding areas into a Sports City. The first phase of the work will get the Bukit Jalil National Stadium ready to host the 2017 Southeast Asia Games.

A Games village was not built; instead, a "village in the city" concept saw athletes and officials housed in 33 hotels across Peninsular Malaysia. Besides being physically near to the venues, it was hoped that it will add vibe to the nation and reduce post-Games costs in converting a dedicated Games village to other uses.

The 29th Southeast Asian Games had 44 venues for the games, 27 in Kuala Lumpur, 10 in Selangor, 3 in Putrajaya, 2 in Negeri Sembilan and 1 in Terengganu and Kedah, respectively.

2017 Southeast Asian Games host states

State	Competition Venue	Sports
Kuala Lumpur	National Sports Complex, Malaysia
Kuala Lumpur	National Aquatic Centre	Aquatics (Swimming, Diving, Synchronised Swimming, Water polo)
Kuala Lumpur	Synthetic Turf Field	Archery
Kuala Lumpur	Bukit Jalil National Stadium	Athletics, opening and closing ceremonies
Kuala Lumpur	Axiata Arena	Badminton
Kuala Lumpur	Malaysia National Hockey Stadium	Field Hockey
Kuala Lumpur	Bukit Kiara Sports Complex
Kuala Lumpur	National Lawn Bowls Centre	Lawn Bowls
Kuala Lumpur	Juara Stadium	Netball, Pencak silat
Kuala Lumpur	Kuala Lumpur Convention Centre
Kuala Lumpur	Hall 4	Billiards and snooker
Kuala Lumpur	Hall 5	Judo, Wushu
Kuala Lumpur	Hall 1	Karate, Taekwondo
Kuala Lumpur	Hall 2	Pencak silat
Kuala Lumpur	Malaysia International Trade and Exhibition Centre (MITEC)
Kuala Lumpur	Hall 8	Boxing, Muaythai
Kuala Lumpur	Hall 6	Fencing
Kuala Lumpur	Hall 9 and 10	Gymnastics
Kuala Lumpur	Hall 4	Indoor Hockey
Kuala Lumpur	Hall 3	Weightlifting
Kuala Lumpur	Hall 7	Table Tennis
Kuala Lumpur	Hall 11	Volleyball
Kuala Lumpur	Others
Kuala Lumpur	Malaysia Basketball Association (MABA) Stadium	Basketball
Kuala Lumpur	National Squash Centre	Squash
Kuala Lumpur	Kuala Lumpur Football Stadium	Football
Kuala Lumpur	University of Malaya	Football
Kuala Lumpur	Raintree Club	Squash
Kuala Lumpur	Pudu Ulu Recreational Park, Kuala Lumpur	Petanque
Kuala Lumpur	National Tennis Centre, Jalan Duta	Tennis
Kuala Lumpur	Titiwangsa Indoor Stadium	Sepak takraw
Kuala Lumpur	Empire City Ice Arena	Ice Hockey, Ice Skating
Selangor	Universiti Teknologi MARA, Shah Alam	Football
Selangor	Shah Alam Stadium	Football
Selangor	MP Selayang Stadium	Football
Selangor	Kinrara Oval, Puchong	Cricket
Selangor	3Q Equestrian Park Rawang	Equestrian (Dressage, Show Jumping)
Selangor	The MINES Resort City Golf Club	Golf
Selangor	MBPJ Stadium	Rugby Sevens
Selangor	National Shooting Range	Shooting
Selangor	Megalanes, Sunway Pyramid	Bowling
Selangor	Panasonic Stadium Shah Alam	Futsal
Putrajaya	Putrajaya Lake	Triathlon, Water Skiing, Aquatics (Open water swimming)
Putrajaya	Putrajaya	Cycling Road, Athletics (Marathon)
Putrajaya	Putrajaya Equestrian Park	Equestrian (Polo)
Negeri Sembilan	Velodrom Nasional Malaysia	Track Cycling, BMX
Negeri Sembilan	Nilai Square	Road Cycling
Terengganu	Terengganu International Equestrian Park	Equestrian (Endurance)
Kedah	National Sailing Centre, Langkawi	Sailing

=== Public transport ===
Rapid KL became one of the 2017 Southeast Asian Games sponsors as “Official Public Transport Service Provider” on 9 May 2017 during the 100-days countdown celebration. The company had expressed commitment to provide 50 Rapid Buses in Klang Valley, fully wrapped with the Games' images and logo, and agreed to extend its service hours during the Games to ease the movement of the public to competition venues. On 11 August 2017, the company announced that it would offer a 50 percent discount on tickets to commuters who utilise its Light Rail Transit, Mass Rail Transit, Bus Rapid Transit and Monorail Line services to competition venues during the Games. Prasarana Malaysia also extended its transportation services hours to 2.00am at selected stations for the comfort of fans and spectators along the Light Rail Transit, Mass Rail Transit and Bus Rapid Transit lines. Several double decker buses were provided to the public who wished to attend the opening ceremony at the National Stadium in Bukit Jalil.

=== Volunteers ===
The organisers estimated that about 20,000 volunteers are needed to successfully host the SEA Games and the ASEAN Para Games. They were tasked with a variety of duties, such as scorekeeping, crowd control, ticketing, promotions. Volunteer recruitment began on 14 November 2015, the same date as the launch party of the games logo, theme and mascot until July 2017, in which 50,000 people have signed up as volunteers. The Games Volunteer Program was held at the National University of Malaysia in Bangi in four phases from February to June. On 19 July 2017, of the 50,000 online applicants, 13,000 people were selected to be the games volunteer. 9,000 people were chosen to be the volunteer of the 2017 Southeast Asian Games, whereas another 4,000 people were chosen to be the volunteer of the 2017 ASEAN Para Games.

=== Ticketing ===
Online tickets were put on sale from 4 July 2017. To encourage public participation at the Games, it was announced on 4 July 2017 that 24 of the sports, aquatics' open swimming event and cycling (BMX and road) events will be free for spectators, while the other 12, such as aquatics (diving, swimming, synchronised and water polo events) and cycling (track events) are kept at relatively affordable levels of between RM10 and RM20.

=== Countdown ===
During the closing ceremony of the 2015 Southeast Asian Games, the SEAGF Flag was formally handed over to Malaysia from Singapore. This was followed by a song and dance section highlighting Malaysia as the next venue. On 14 November 2015, a launch party was held at the Suria KLCC to launch the logo, mascot and the volunteer recruitment programme.

On 19 August 2016, a series of festivities, dubbed the "Wau Factor" were held at the National Sports Council Centre in Setiawangsa, to mark the one-year countdown to the games. From 2 March to 20 May 2017 Malaysia SEA Games organising committee organised a school tour programme dubbed the KL2017@Schools programme at 33 selected schools across Peninsular Malaysia to instill awareness about the games amongst the school students.

On 9 May 2017, Malaysia SEA Games Organising committee organised a major countdown event at KL Sentral to mark the 100-day countdown in a few days which was attended by athletes, officials, para-athletes, stakeholders, sponsors and volunteers. After that, various individuals and organisations marked the games countdown through a video tribute. This included: Kyopropaganda and Malaysia SEA Games Organising Committee (100, 100-people mass exercise), Ipan Bender (90, 90 High Fives), Intan Sarah and National Women Futsal teammates (80, Ball-juggling 80 times), Aminemo and the Royal Malaysian Police Personnel (70, 70 times push-ups in 7 different ways), Superpandy, Farhan Kapoor and the scouts (60, Building a tower of bottles in 60 seconds using 100 Plus bottles), Joseph Germani and Malaysia Basketball Association trainees (50, score 50 basketball shots), Olivia Shyan and the SK Taman Megah students (40, plant 40 plants), Ahmad Aiman and 30 locals (30, 30-people teh tarik relay), Muhammad Rezza, Akwa Ariffin and 20 tai chi practitioners (20, doing tai chi with 20 practitioners), Joseph Germani and the Fire and Rescue Department of Malaysia personnel (10, doing 10 times burpees), Farhan Hadi, Preston Les and Tanesh (3, doing three-legged race), Ain Suhada and Iqbal Harun (2, Exercise with a Partner) and Miss Alvy, Yasmin Matthews, Khor Adrian and Raj Mahal (1, paint a number 1 sculpture bearing the stripes of the games logo with a group of people). A run competition dubbed the 2017 SEA Games Run was held in Putrajaya the same day as the Games' marathon event (at the same venue) and opening ceremony.

=== Security ===
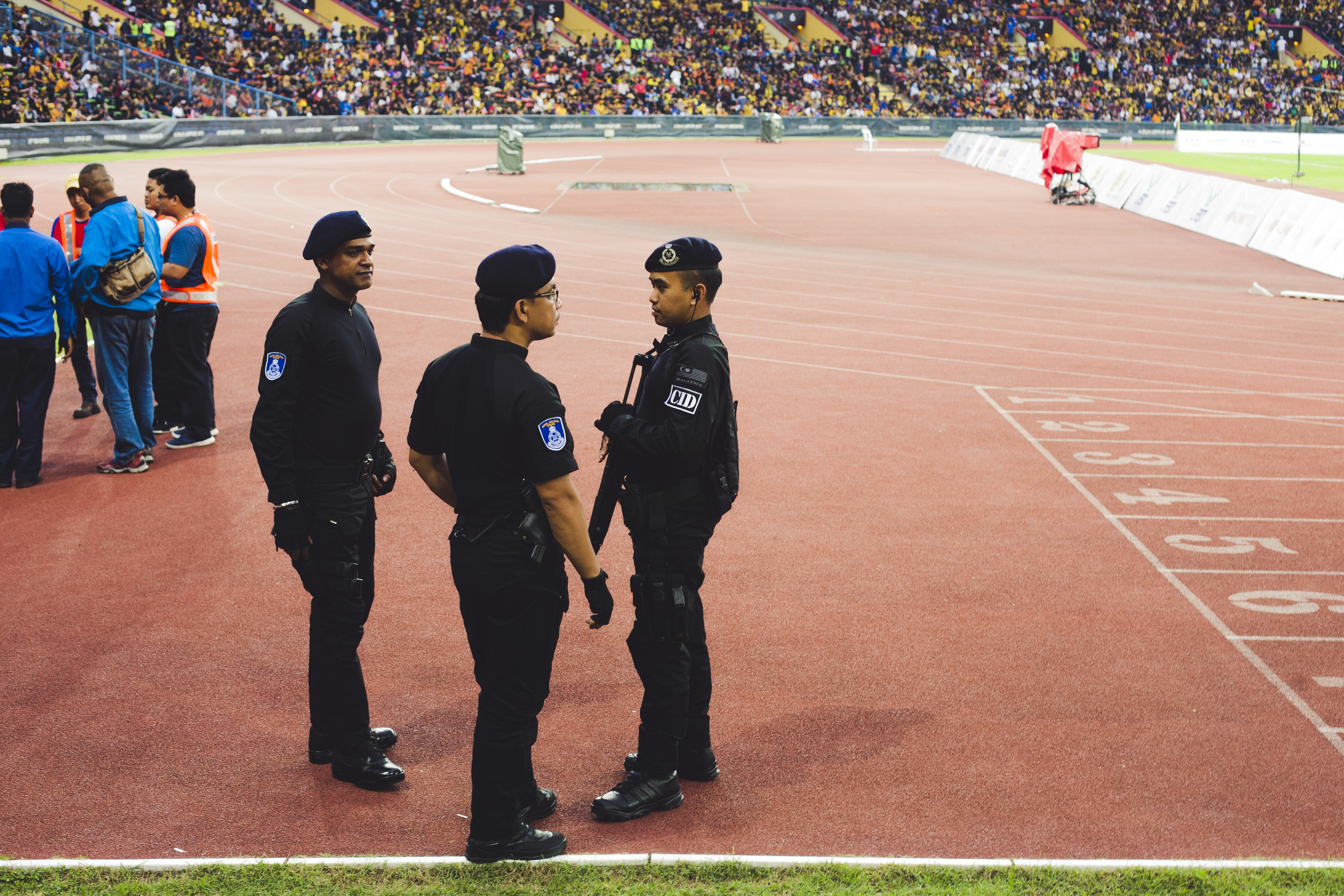
Officers of the Royal Malaysia Police on duty at the men's football final.

The principal agency to ensure the security of the Games was the Royal Malaysia Police. Six drills were held to prepare the police force to face any unforeseen situations.

=== Medals ===
Kuala Lumpur 2017 medals.

The medals of the Games were designed by Royal Selangor, which is also the designer company for the torch and the baton. They were announced on 30 May 2017, the same day Royal Selangor announced as one of the Games' main sponsors which made MASOC's sponsorship total RM82.6 million, exceeded its sponsorship target of RM80 million. The medals have subtle curved surfaces, rims and edges, and are made of pewter with a disc of kempas wood integrated into the design. They featured the Southeast Asian Games Federation logo on the obverse (In the case of ASEAN Para Games, it is the ASEAN Para Sports Federation logo), and the games logo on the reverse.

=== Baton relay ===
Baton of the Games.

The games baton relay, dubbed the Rising Together Baton Run, was the first of its kind in the history of Southeast Asian Games. It covered a distance of 10 kilometres on average in the 10 capital cities of the Southeast Asian Region countries, excluding the host country, passing through the landmarks of each countries' capital city. The baton relay began with Brunei on 5 March 2017, followed by the Philippines on 12 March, Laos on 18 March, Myanmar on 25 March, Thailand on 1 April, Vietnam on 9 April, East Timor on 17 April, Cambodia on 22 April and Indonesia on 30 April and ended with Singapore on 13 May 2017. The games baton was designed by Royal Selangor which sold the baton to the public at MYR 1480 and its design was inspired by the games' theme, rising together. Its design depicts shards and a triangular cross section. The baton has a length of 400 mm, a width of 44 mm, weighs approximately 600g and made up of materials which are a stave in kempas, a tawny wood native to Southeast Asia, and a satin-finished pewter finial.

2017 Southeast Asian Games baton relay route.

5 March
1.Brunei
12 March
2.Philippines
18 March
3.Laos
25 March
4.Myanmar

1 April
5.Thailand
9 April
6.Vietnam
17 April
7.East Timor
22 April
8.Cambodia

30 April
9.Indonesia
13 May
10.Singapore
11.Malaysia (Torch relay)

=== Torch relay ===
Torch of the Games.

The same day the baton relay ended in Singapore, the torch relay was held across the country began with the state of Johor until 18 May 2017, followed by Malacca from 18 to 21 May 2017, Negeri Sembilan from 22 to 25 May, Labuan from 3 to 4 June, Sabah from 5 to 8 June, Sarawak from 8 to 13 June, Perlis from 15 to 17 June, Kedah from 17 to 20 June, Penang from 3 to 6 July, Perak from 7 to 12 July, Kelantan from 13 to 17 July, Terengganu from 17 to 23 July, Pahang from 24 to 30 July, Selangor from 31 July to 5 August, and ended with Putrajaya and the host city Kuala Lumpur from 6 to 12 August 2017. The games torch has a length of 125 mm, width of 86 mm and a height of 850 mm and weighs 2 kg with fuel and 1.8 kg without fuel. Like the baton, the torch was designed too by Royal Selangor. It has a sleek custom-milled combustion chamber, a triangular cross section and has the games logo and motto, the SEA Games and the ASEAN Para Games logo emblazoned on it.

2017 Southeast Asian Games torch relay route.

13–18 May
1. Johor
18–21 May
2. Malacca
22–25 May
3. Negeri Sembilan
3–4 June
4. Labuan
5–8 June
5. Sabah

8–13 June
6. Sarawak
15–17 June
7.Perlis
17–20 June
8.Kedah
3–6 July
9.Penang
7–12 July
10.Perak

13–17 July
11.Kelantan
17–23 July
12.Terengganu
24–30 July
13.Pahang
31 July – 5 August
14.Selangor
6–12 August
15.Putrajaya
16.Kuala Lumpur (host city)

=== Sustainability ===
As an aspect of staging the Games, the organising committee committed to a focus on sustainability and environmental protection by launching the Kuala Lumpur 2017 Green Initiatives on 5 June 2017. Among the activities of the initiative is the ‘One Medal, One Tree’ programme aimed at having a total of 5,249 trees be planted in and around Kuala Lumpur Sports City, one for each medal awarded to winning athlete during the games which is divided into three phases. Other activities included providing waste recycling bins at games' main venue, providing public transportation and providing electric car facilities at selected spots of the games' main venue.

== Marketing ==
=== Motto ===
The official motto of the 2017 Southeast Asian Games is "Rising Together" or "Bangkit Bersama" in Malay. It was chosen to highlight unity between the nations in Southeast Asia as well as to signify the Kuala Lumpur games as the first Southeast Asian Games to be held after the formation of the ASEAN Community in 2015.

=== Logo ===
The logo of the 2017 Southeast Asian Games is an image of a Wau Bulan, a crescent-shaped kite traditionally popular on the east coast of Peninsular Malaysia. The combination of stripes and colours of the logo were derived from the flags of all countries in Southeast Asia. A nationwide competition was held to select the logo of the games which saw a total of 174 entries submitted for the design competition. The Kuala Lumpur 2017 logo, made by combining the games' logo with the logo of 2017 ASEAN Para Games is sometimes used by the organisers to reflect the common relationship as parallel games of one another with SEA Games being held for the able-bodied athletes and the ASEAN Para games held for the disabled athletes.

Wau, the logo of Kuala Lumpur 2017 (Combination of SEA Games logo with ASEAN Para Games logo

=== Mascot ===
Rimau, a Malayan tiger, is the official mascot of the Games.

The official mascot of the 2017 Southeast Asian Games is an anthropomorphic Malayan tiger named Rimau. It was unveiled on 14 November 2015, together with the games' logo and theme. The mascot's name is not only a Malay word for Tiger, but also an abbreviation of the games' core values, namely: Respect, Integrity, Move, Attitude and Unity. He is described as a gracious, friendly, competitive and athletic athlete.

=== Songs ===
The 2017 Southeast Asian Games had 4 theme songs. During the 100 day countdown celebration on 9 May 2017, Malaysians were requested by singer Dayang Nurfaizah and composer Ramli MS to submit their ideas and stories related to the games' theme "Rising Together" to social network websites through a crowdsourcing campaign to enable them to create the games theme song. On 8 August 2017, one theme song for the games has been released and is entitled "Rising Together" (Bangkit Bersama).

On 2 August 2017, a theme song titled "Tunjuk Belang" (Show The Stripes) was released. It was performed by monoloQue, Azlan Typewriter and maliQue. The song is described as a rock song which merges "traditional and modern sounds". The composer and producer of the song is maliQue. The title of the song literally means showing off one's true colours in English and "Belang" means stripes alluding to the mascot of the games, shown above.

Another theme song was released earlier on 13 July 2017, titled "So Many Hands" (Tangan-Tangan Yang Menjulang) and was performed by Mia Palencia in English and Asmidar in Malay which is the song of the Kuala Lumpur 2017 Promo Video, "It Takes a Nation to Raise a Champion" (Bersama Kita Lahirkan Juara).

A closing theme song for the Games, "Together We Rise" was released on 30 August 2017. It was performed by Vince Chong and Jaclyn Victor.

=== Sponsors ===
Dentsu Sports Asia, a subsidiary of Dentsu and the Sportswork Group were the sponsorship agencies of the 2017 Southeast Asian Games. The partnership of the two firms were announced in January 2016. Dentsu is responsible for manages sponsorship matters involving international and Malaysian firms while Sportswork manages Malaysian government linked companies

There were four tiers of sponsorship depending on the amount of funds a company contributed to the Games. Bronze sponsors contributed RM1 million or less, Silver sponsors contributed RM1 to 3 million. Gold sponsors contributed RM3 to 7.5 million and Platinum sponsors contributed RM7.5 to 15 million.

Sponsors of the 2017 Southeast Asian Games
Platinum Sponsors
- Ajinomoto
- FBT
- Naza (Nasim Sdn Bhd)
- Petronas
- Rapid KL
- Telekom Malaysia
Gold Sponsors
- AirAsia
- Grab Holdings
- Malaysia Airports
- Sony
- Tenaga Nasional
- Traveloka
Silver Sponsors
- 100plus
- Aeon
- McDonald's
- Nestlé (Milo)
- Pavilion Kuala Lumpur
- Prudential plc
- Royal Selangor
- SCGM Bhd (Benxon)
- Spritzer
Bronze Sponsors
- Double Happiness
- Gloria Jean's Coffees
- JVCKenwood (Kenwood Corporation)
- La Martina
- Maha Mas Medic
- Maju Group
- Marathon
- Maxwin
- Mikasa-Sunrise
- MLS-Zimmer-Airflex
- Molten Corporation
- MRCB
- Nittaku
- Ottobock
- Sunstar Group
- Trybe
- Victor
- Wiraka

== The Games ==
=== Opening ceremony ===
The opening ceremony was held in Bukit Jalil National Stadium on 19 August 2017 at 20:17 MST (UTC+8) which highlighted aspects of Malaysia's history and culture. The ceremony was directed by film director Saw Teong Hin alongside the Memories Entertainment creative team with co-operation from the Malaysian Armed Forces. The time 20:17 was chosen to start the opening ceremony to mark the year 2017, the year which Malaysia hosted the 29th Southeast Asian Games.

The Games were officially declared open by the then Yang di-Pertuan Agong of Malaysia, Sultan Muhammad V while diver Nur Dhabitah Sabri lit the cauldron of the games.

=== Closing ceremony ===
The closing ceremony was held in Bukit Jalil National Stadium on 30 August 2017 at 21:30 MST (UTC+8). The closing ceremony coincided with the eve of the Malaysia's 60th Independence Day celebrations. Like the opening ceremony, the closing ceremony was directed by film director Saw Teong Hin alongside the Memories Entertainment creative team with co-operation from the Malaysian Armed Forces.

The ceremony started with the Malaysian Armed Forces performing Negaraku, this time with in-suit performers as Rimau being the drummers, followed by the parade of athletes from 11 nations and Rimau entering the stage, with Malaysia entering first. The parade of volunteers started with the formation of the word "WAU", symbolising the name of the volunteer programme, "WAU Factor", followed by a video shot in the first-person's point of view of one volunteer helping in sports including basketball, athletics and gymnastics. A cultural performance titled "Terima Kasih Daun Keladi", an inspiration related to nature, was presented. A closing speech was given by the president of the Malaysian Olympic Council, Tunku Imran. Prime Minister of Malaysia Najib Razak then declared the 2017 Southeast Asian Games closed, followed by extinguishing of the cauldron when Jaclyn Victor and Vince Chong performed "Together We Rise". A video about the sports teams, featuring mostly Malaysian sports medalists and their families, was played, followed by the lowering of the SEA Games Federation flag by the Royal Malaysian Navy. The Southeast Asian Games Federation flag was handed over from the Minister of the Youth and Sports of Malaysia to Foreign Affairs Secretary Alan Peter Cayetano, chairman of the 2019 Southeast Asian Games organising committee through Tunku Imran and the Philippine Olympic Committee (POC) president Jose "Peping" Cojuangco. The National Anthem of the Philippines, Lupang Hinirang was played and the Philippines flag was raised, symbolising the hosting responsibilities being passed to Philippines. A video of the Philippines tourism was later shown. The ceremony concluded through the integration of Malaysia's National Day eve celebration (the first in history inside the stadium), in a form of a concert of Malaysian songs from the 1950s to the 2010s, titled "Soundtrack: Negaraku", featuring performances by local artists including M. Nasir, Salamiah Hassan, Azlan Typewriter, Joe Flizzow, Vince Chong, Atai, Francissca Peter, Marsha Milan Londoh, Dasha Logan, Amy Search, Sheila Majid, Siti Nordiana, Man Bai, Talitha Tan, Hijjaz, Ella, Jason Lo, Zainal Abidin, Black, Faizal Tahir, SonaOne and Jaclyn Victor. After these performances, a video presentation was played, featuring quotations and photo montage of Malaysia's first Prime Minister Tunku Abdul Rahman. Afterwards, PM Razak went to the main stage, wherein he gave a speech congratulating the organisers, regional guests and, especially, Malaysians who ended its campaign by collecting the highest number of gold medals. He then, just after midnight, surprised the audience in excitement by declaring 4 September a public holiday (a move he already planned during the games) as a reward for Malaysia's spectacular achievement. Concluding his speech, PM Razak led the nation in chanting "Merdeka!" seven times to mark Malaysia's 60th year of Independence. As with its annual traditions during National Day eve, Negaraku was played for the second time, this time, led by the Permata Seni Choir. To mark the games' historic moment, a We-fie photo-op was taken around the entire stadium. The concert ended with four patriotic songs including the aforementioned artists' cover of Saya Anak Malaysia, Amy Search's Negaraku, Dayang Nurfaizah's cover of Sudiman's Warisan and Atai's performance of Tanggal 31 Ogos, to celebrate Malaysia's 60th Independence Day.

=== Participating nations ===
All 11 members of Southeast Asian Games Federation (SEAGF). Below is a list of all the participating NOCs.

- Brunei (105 athletes)
- Cambodia (169)
- Indonesia (535)
- Laos (195)
- Malaysia (844) (host)
- Myanmar (405)
- Philippines (502)
- Singapore (569)
- Thailand (818)
- Timor-Leste (50)
- Vietnam (460)

=== Sports ===
On 16 June 2015, chief executive officer for the 2017 SEA Games, Zolkples Embong said the staging of Olympic sports hopes will be part of the legacy of the SEA Games in Malaysia. He said that while it has always been the norm for host nations to select sports they are geared towards in an attempt to increase their haul of gold medals, the practice is not in line with the goals, which is to groom athletes from the region to compete at the Asian and Olympic Games. He gives an example of 2011 Southeast Asian Games hosted by Indonesia which included many non-Olympic sports and the host played to their advantage by being the overall winners with 182 gold medals. However, Indonesia only won 47 gold medals in 2015 Southeast Asian Games. He added, in terms of the number and type of sports, Malaysia may not include non-Olympic sports like floorball and sailing's optimist race in 2017.

As of February 2016, the sports of archery, BMX cycling, wrestling, triathlon, judo, muaythai, canoeing, bodybuilding and fencing were removed from the preliminary shortlist. Also removed from the list are the women's events in boxing, billiards and snooker, sanda, and weightlifting and 8 events in Athletics. National Olympic Committees from the 11 participating countries had until 9 March to appeal to reinclude the delisted sports in the shortlist.

On 12 May 2016, a meeting between Olympic Council of Malaysia and Paralympic Council of Malaysia, chaired by sports minister Khairy Jamaluddin was held to propose the merger of the 2017 Southeast Asian Games and the 2017 ASEAN Para Games into a single games which if approved will integrate the para sports into the games' main programme. The same topic was also discussed at the Asean Para Sports Federation Board of Governors meeting on 7 June 2016. By 14 July, the proposal has been rejected by SEA Games Federation (SEAGF) Council, with 9 member countries have opposed the proposal while only two (Malaysia and Laos) agreed, citing the reason for the rejection was due to the tradition and culture that has long been maintained by SEAGF.

38 sports with 404 events in all for the Games were included in the final list approved by the SEAGF on 14 July 2016. Winter sports were introduced for the first time in Games history.

- Aquatics
  - Diving (13)
  - Swimming (40)
  - Synchronised swimming (5)
  - Water polo (2)
- Archery (10)
- Athletics (45)
- Badminton (7)
- Basketball (2)
- Billiards and snooker (7)
- Bowling (11)
- Boxing (6)
- Cricket (3)
- Cycling (20)
  - BMX (2)
  - Road (5)
  - Track (13)
- Equestrian
  - Equestrian (6)
  - Polo (1)
- Fencing (6)
- Football
  - Football (2)
  - Futsal (2)
- Golf (4)
- Gymnastics (20)
  - Artistic (12)
  - Rhythmic (8)
- Hockey
  - Field hockey (2)
  - Indoor hockey (2)
- Ice hockey (1)
- Ice skating
  - Figure skating (2)
  - Short track speed skating (6)
- Judo (6)
- Karate (16)
- Lawn bowls (8)
- Muaythai (5)
- Netball (1)
- Pencak silat (20)
- Pétanque (7)
- Rugby sevens (2)
- Sailing (14)
- Sepak takraw (12)
  - Chinlone (4)
  - Sepak takraw (8)
- Shooting (14)
- Squash (9)
- Table tennis (7)
- Taekwondo (16)
- Tennis (5)
- Triathlon (2)
- Volleyball (2)
- Waterskiing (11)
- Weightlifting (5)
- Wushu (17)

=== Calendar ===
OC	Opening ceremony	●	Event competitions	1	Gold medal events	CC	Closing ceremony

August	14 Mon	15 Tue	16 Wed	17 Thu	18 Fri	19 Sat	20 Sun	21 Mon	22 Tue	23 Wed	24 Thu	25 Fri	26 Sat	27 Sun	28 Mon	29 Tue	30 Wed	Events
Ceremonies						OC											CC	—N/a
Archery			2	2	1		2	2	1									10
Athletics						2			8	9	9	9	8					45
Badminton									●	●	2		●	●	●	5		7
Basketball							●	●	●	●	●	●	2					2
Billiards & snooker									●	2	1	1	●	3				7
Bowling							2	2	1	2	2	2						11
Boxing							●	●	●		6							6
Cricket				●	●	●	●	●	●	●	1	●	●	●	1	1		3
Cycling								2	1	1	1		2	4	4	5		20
Diving													3	2	3	3	2	13
Equestrian							2		1	●	1		1		1			6
Fencing								2	2	2								6
Field hockey								●	●	●	●	●	●	●	1	1		2
Figure skating													●	2				2
Football	●	●	●	●	●		●	●	●	●	1		●			1		2
Futsal					●		●		●			●		2				2
Golf									●	●	4	●	4					4
Gymnastics							1	1	5	5			1	2	5			20
Ice hockey							●	●	●	●	1							1
Indoor hockey								●	●	●	●	1	1					2
Judo													3	3				6
Karate									6	6	4							16
Lawn bowls									●	●	2	2	2	2				8
Muaythai													●	●	●	5		5
Netball	●	●	●	●	●	●	1											1
Pencak silat											1	1	1		1	16		20
Pétanque								●	2	●	2	●	2	●	1			7
Polo									●		●		●		●	1		1
Rugby sevens						●	2											2
Sailing								●	3		●	●	●	4	2	5		14
Sepaktakraw			2	2	●	1	●	1	1	●	●	2	●	2	●	1		12
Shooting								1	3	2	3	2	3					14
Short track speed skating																2	4	6
Squash								●	●	2	3	●	●	●	2	2		9
Swimming					2			6	6	6	7	7	6					40
Synchronised swimming				2	1		2											5
Table tennis							3	●	2		●	●	2					7
Taekwondo													5	4	3	4		16
Tennis								●	●	●	●	2	3					5
Triathlon								2										2
Volleyball								●	●	●	●	●	●	2				2
Water polo		●	●	●	●	1	1											2
Waterskiing												●	4	1	●	6		11
Weightlifting															2	2	1	5
Wushu							5	6	6									17
Daily medal events	0	0	4	6	4	4	21	25	48	37	49	29	51	33	26	60	7	404
Cumulative total	0	0	4	10	14	18	39	64	112	149	198	227	278	311	337	397	404	404
August	14 Mon	15 Tue	16 Wed	17 Thu	18 Fri	19 Sat	20 Sun	21 Mon	22 Tue	23 Wed	24 Thu	25 Fri	26 Sat	27 Sun	28 Mon	29 Tue	30 Wed	Total events

== Medal table ==
The 2017 Southeast Asian Games featured 404 events, resulting in 404 medal sets to be distributed.

Two additional gold medals were awarded as there were first-place ties in women's high jump and men's pommel horse. As a consequence, no silver medal was awarded in these events.

Two bronze medals were awarded in some events: most events in martial arts (6 in boxing, 6 in judo, 15 in karate, 5 in muay thai, 14 in pencak silat, and 15 in taekwondo); all events in racket sports (7 in badminton, 9 in squash, 7 in table tennis, and 5 in tennis); billiards and snooker (7), fencing (6), netball (1), pétanque (7), and sepak takraw (11). Furthermore, there were third-place ties in the Rhythmic Gymnastics women's hoop event and Swimming women's 50 m backstroke event, giving a total of 123 additional bronze medals. On the other hand, no bronze medal was awarded in the men's 3000 m relay short track speed skating event.

As a result, a total of 1,334 medals comprising 406 gold medals, 402 silver medals, and 526 bronze medals were awarded to athletes.

* Host nation (Malaysia)

2017 Southeast Asian Games medal table
Rank	NOC	Gold	Silver	Bronze	Total
1	Malaysia*	145	92	86	323
2	Thailand	72	86	88	246
3	Vietnam	59	50	60	169
4	Singapore	57	58	73	188
5	Indonesia	38	63	90	191
6	Philippines	23	33	63	119
7	Myanmar	7	10	20	37
8	Cambodia	3	2	12	17
9	Laos	2	3	21	26
10	Brunei	0	5	9	14
11	Timor-Leste	0	0	3	3
Totals (11 entries)		406	402	525	1,333

Source: 2017 Sea Games News

Medal change (Possible)

Malaysian gold medalists Wendy Ng Yan Yee (aquatics - diving), Thai gold medalists Nurisan Loseng (pencak silat), and Thai silver medalists Benjaporn Sriphanomthorn (aquatics - swimming) tested positive for a banned drug and was stripped of their medals. Collin Syquia (equestrian) of the Philippines was also stripped of his gold medal after his horse Andrew E tested positive for a banned substance.

Ruling date	Sport	Event	Nation	Gold	Silver	Bronze	Total
2017	Diving	Women's 3 metre springboard	Malaysia		–1		–1
2017	Diving	Women's synchronised 3 metre springboard	Malaysia	–1			–1
2017	Diving	Women's synchronised 3 metre springboard	Singapore	+1	−1		0
2017	Swimming	4×200 m freestyle relay	Thailand		–1		–1
2017	Swimming	4×200 m freestyle relay	Philippines		+1	–1	0
2017	Swimming	10 km open water	Thailand		–1		–1
2017	Swimming	10 km open water	Singapore		+1	–1	0
2017	Pencak silat	Women's team	Thailand	–1			–1
2017	Pencak silat	Women's team	Vietnam	+1	–1		0
2018	Equestrian	Individual jumping	Philippines	–1			–1
2018	Equestrian	Individual jumping	Malaysia	+1	–1		0

- Change in medal table will only officially be confirmed after the release of the report.

== Broadcasting ==
During the Games, 28 sports events were broadcast live. The host broadcast activities were provided by International Games Broadcast Services (IGBS), the production house, in partnership with SEA Games Television (SGTV) a joint venture between Astro, Radio Televisyen Malaysia and Media Prima. The International Broadcast Centre was located at Malaysia International Trade and Exhibition Centre (MITEC).

Key

* Host nation (Malaysia)

2017 SEA Games Broadcasters rights in Southeast Asia
IOC Code	Country	Broadcast network	Television network	Radio network	Digital network
BRU	Brunei	Radio Televisyen Brunei; Kristal-Astro	RTB Perdana; Astro Arena; Astro Arena HD	Ai FM; Hot FM; One FM	
CAM	Cambodia	Radio and Television of Cambodia	Television of Cambodia	Radio of Cambodia	
INA	Indonesia	TVRI; MNC Media; Emtek	TVRI; MNCTV (Indonesia futsal team matches only); SCTV (Indonesia football team matches only); Indosiar (Indonesia badminton only)	Radio Republik Indonesia	Emtek (Nexmedia, Vidio.com)
LAO	Laos	Laos National Radio and Television	Lao National Television	Lao National Radio	
MAS	Malaysia*	Radio Televisyen Malaysia (RTM); Media Prima; Astro; HyppTV	TV1; TV2; TV3; TV9; TVi; Astro Arena; Astro Arena HD; Hypp Sports HD	Ai FM; Hot FM; KL FM; Minnal FM; Nasional FM; One FM; TEA FM; Traxx FM	RTM (MyKlik); Media Prima (Tonton); Astro (Astro Go & NJOI Now); HyppTV (HyppTV Everywhere)
MYA	Myanmar	Myanmar Radio and Television	Sky Net; MRTV-4; MRTV	Myanmar Radio	
PHI	Philippines	PTV	PTV; TV5	Radyo Pilipinas 2 918 kHz	
SGP	Singapore	Mediacorp	Mediacorp oktoSports	MediaCorp Radio 938LIVE	Mediacorp (Toggle)
THA	Thailand	Television Pool of Thailand (TPT)	BEC-TV Channel 3 Royal Thai Army Channel 5 BBTV Channel 7 Modernine TV; NBT channel	MCOT Radio Network, NBT Radio	True ID
TLS	Timor-Leste	RTTL; Asiansport Channel Network	Televisão Timor Leste; Asiansport	Radio Timor Leste	
VIE	Vietnam	VTV; HTV	VTV2; VTV6; HTV9; HTV Thể Thao	Voice of Vietnam	K+, VTVcab

== Concerns and controversies ==
The 2017 Southeast Asian Games was marred with a series of controversies, ranging from transportation to doping issues.

== See also ==
- 2017 ASEAN Para Games

Preceded by Singapore	Southeast Asian Games; Kuala Lumpur; XXIX Southeast Asian Games (2017)	Succeeded by Philippines
