= TV9 (Malaysian TV network) =

Malaysian television network

- Logo used since 9 September 2021, it was introduced in Buletin TV9 on 1 August 2021
- Country: Malaysia
- Broadcast area: Malaysia; Singapore; Brunei; Thailand (Southern Thailand); Indonesia (West and North Kalimantan and Riau Islands); Philippines (Southern Palawan and Tawi-Tawi)
- Headquarters: Balai Berita, Bangsar, Kuala Lumpur, Malaysia

Programming
- Language: Malay
- Picture format: 16:9 1080i HDTV (downscaled to 16:9 576i for the SDTV feed)

Ownership
- Owner: Media Prima
- Parent: Ch-9 Media Sdn Bhd
- Sister channels: TV3; DidikTV KPM; NTV7; 8TV; Drama Sangat

History
- Founded: 22 March 1982; 44 years ago (as Medanmas Sdn Bhd); 19 November 2003; 22 years ago (as Ch-9 Media Sdn Bhd)
- Launched: 9 September 2003; 23 years ago (as Channel 9); 22 April 2006; 20 years ago (as TV9)
- Founder: Datuk Zainal Osman Mohd; Datin Anita Rafar
- Closed: 3 February 2005; 21 years ago (as Channel 9)
- Former names: Channel 9 (9 September 2003 – 3 February 2005)

Links
- Website: www.xtra.com.my (Merged into Tonton Xtra's site, formerly tv9.com.my)

Availability

Terrestrial
- MYTV: Channel 109 (HD)

Evolution of Media Prima
- 1974: The New Straits Times Press is founded
- 1984: TV3 is launched
- 1985: Renong Berhad acquired TV3 and NSTP from Fleet Group
- 1993: Malaysian Resources Corporation Berhad acquires TV3 and NSTP from Renong Berhad
- 1995: MetroVision is launched Mega TV began operations Akademi TV3 is founded Grand Brilliance is founded Ambang Klasik is founded
- 1998: ntv7 is launched
- 1999: MetroVision ceased operations
- 2000: Profitune is founded Akademi TV3 renamed as the Malaysia Institute of Integrative Media (MIIM); NSTP divested Berita Publishing to Alaf Positif
- 2001: Mega TV ceased operations MRCB announces its intent to divested equity interest in TV3 and NSTP and transferred them to Profitune
- 2002: Profitune renamed as Media Prima; Ambang Klasik ceased operations
- 2003: Corporate restructuring of MRCB and divestiture of TV3 and NSTP by MRCB is completed Media Prima began operations and acquires MetroVision; Channel 9 is launched TV3 divested MIIM to SAL Group of Colleges
- 2004: MetroVision is relaunched and renamed as 8TV
- 2005: Channel 9 ceased operations Media Prima acquires ntv7 and Channel 9 Fly FM is launched
- 2006: Hot FM is launched Channel 9 relaunched and renamed as TV9
- 2007: Catch-Up TV is launched Gua.com.my is launched
- 2008: Primeworks Studios is founded
- 2009: One FM is launched
- 2011: Emas is launched MIIM ceased operations
- 2012: Media Prima Digital is founded
- 2014: Emas ceased operations
- 2015: Media Prima acquires Copyright Laureate which owns Ultra FM and Pi Mai FM
- 2016: Kool FM is launched CJ Wow Shop is launched
- 2017: Media Prima acquires REV Asia Holdings; Drama Sangat is launched
- 2018: Media Prima Radio Networks rebranded as Ripple Media
- 2020: Media Prima Omnia is launched CJ Wow Shop renamed as Wow Shop
- 2021: Ripple Media rebranded as Media Prima Audio; Kool FM and One FM rebranded as Buletin FM and 8FM respectively
- 2022: Molek FM is launched
- 2023: Buletin FM rebranded as Kool 101; 8FM renamed as Eight FM
- 2025: Kool 101 reverted into Kool FM

Ch-9 Media Sdn Bhd, operating as TV9 (spelled as tivi sembilan) is a Malaysian free-to-air television network owned and operated by Media Prima Berhad. It airs programming that tends mostly towards the Malay demographic. The channel formerly existed as Channel 9 from 9 September 2003 until 3 February 2005 due to financial difficulties faced by the operator and relaunched as TV9 on 22 April 2006. It started broadcasting 24 hours a day on 6 May 2019.

== History ==
=== As Channel 9 ===
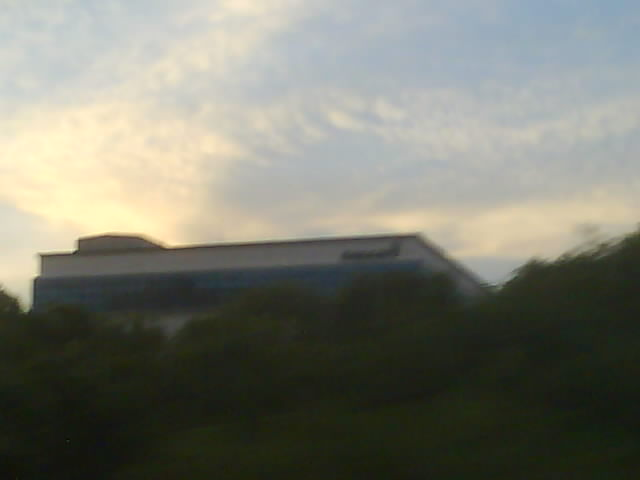
Former Channel 9 (now TV9) headquarters at Shah Alam, Selangor

In 1997, TV3 had plans to start a second channel by the name of TV9, unrelated to the present-day television network of the same name. The application had yet to be received by the Information Ministry. The plan was later scrapped.

In 2003, a third private TV station began its test transmission in Klang Valley by early August, revealing the Channel 9 name to the public. It was expected to launch the channel in early September. Ch-9 Media Sdn. Bhd. (formerly known as Medanmas Sdn Bhd) was founded in 22 March 1982 by Datuk Zainal Osman Mohd. and Datin Anita Rafar, expected to turn a profit by September 2004. A new corporate logo and web portal of Channel 9 was launched on 12 August 2003 and officiated by the then-Minister of Energy, Communications and Multimedia, Leo Moggie. The TV channel catered to young audiences and offered programmes in various genres such as drama and variety shows.

Many non-governmental organisations, including the Malaysian Youth Council, demanded that Channel 9 give opportunities to younger Malaysians to produce more TV programmes and films. Channel 9 would spend RM35 million in total out of its RM50 million investment in ICT as part of its preparation to move into digital broadcasting.

Channel 9 delayed its tune-in exercise, which slated to start on 16 August, and resumed on 2 September, prior to its official launch. The delay was made to ensure "viewers receive the satisfying services".

Channel 9 (often simply known as Nine or shortened to C9, stylised in a lowercase title) was launched on 9 September 2003, broadcasting daily from 8:00 am to 3:00 am daily. Channel 9 was conceived and launched by media entrepreneur, Jamal Hassim. At the time it was a rare feat for a national free-to-air television network to be established by a private individual. Its headquarters was located at Temasya Industrial Park in Shah Alam, Selangor.

In late October 2003, the National Cancer Council of Malaysia (MAKNA) partnered with Channel 9 to launch an annual cancer fundraising campaign named Telekanser 2003. The channel became the media partner and official broadcaster of the campaign.

The channel began upgrading its broadcast transmission in November 2003.

In January 2004, Channel 9 was in talks with pay television provider Astro to allow the channel to be included on its platforms. It also expanded its broadcast transmission coverage to the northern part of Peninsular Malaysia.

In May 2004, Channel 9 entered a strategic partnership with Time Highway Radio (THR) following the acquisition of its operating company, Medanmas, which eventually renamed as Ch-9 Media, by Anaza Sdn. Bhd., which is headed by Tan Sri Rashid Manaf.

In June 2004, Channel 9 introduced its affordable advertisement broadcast payment rate, which was 80 percent lower.

Starting 1 July 2004, Channel 9 underwent a major rebranding exercise with an up-to-date branding image and launch a new slogan, "Malaysia…lah!". Following the rebranding, the channel installed a transmitter in Bukit Besi to allow viewers to receive good wide coverage of its transmission. Channel 9 launched its own news bulletin called Seputar Malaysia. It also signed a memorandum with public broadcaster, Radio Televisyen Malaysia (RTM) where its English news began broadcasting on the channel.

Due to financial difficulties faced by its owner and operator, Channel 9 ceased broadcasting on 3 February 2005. Prior to its shutdown, Tan Sri Rashid Manaf, the channel's owner, denied accusations that the channel is being sold, saying that it was "purely speculation". The channel was ordered by the Government to postpone its broadcasting license and took a year hiatus from broadcast.

In June 2005, Channel 9 was acquired by Malaysia's largest media corporation, Media Prima Berhad. At the same time, the company planned to relaunch Channel 9 by early 2006.

In September 2005, Media Prima confirmed that it would relaunch the channel in the first quarter of 2006 after receiving approval from its minority shareholders. It also had completed the acquisition of 100% equity stake in Ch-9 Media and almost completed the company's ownership of all commercial free-to-air television network in Malaysia.

=== Renamed as TV9 and early history ===
Channel 9 was renamed and rebranded as TV9 on 17 March 2006, with test transmission commenced on Saturday, 1 April 2006 with 4-hour broadcasts from 8:00 pm to midnight daily and airing music videos mostly in Malay. Full launch of the channel began at noon of 22 April 2006 with 13-hour broadcasts from 12:00 pm to 1:00 am daily and a new slogan: Dekat di Hati (Malay for Close at heart).

Upon its relaunch, TV9 allocated RM20 million for the first year of its operations to provide better contents for viewers. At the same time, it partnered with Senheng where the latter would supply its electrical equipment, including installing antennas for TV9. By the end of June 2006, TV9 completed the installation of permanent transmitters on several locations in the East Coast region.

By August 2006, TV9 reached 11% of Malay viewership market after 4 months of operations.

TV9 is available via terrestrial television in Peninsular Malaysia. Since 28 December 2006, it expanded its coverage to Sabah, Sarawak through Malaysian satellite TV provider, Astro.

For the first months of broadcast, TV9 did not have its own in-house news bulletin, except for Edisi 7 simulcasts from its sister channel, NTV7. After two months, it set up its news division and held an audition looking for news anchors. TV9 began to produce news bulletins on New Year's Day 2007, under the Berita TV9 (literally: TV9 News) brand. It is currently broadcasting two half-hour editions: a midday edition at 1:00 pm Saturday to Thursday, and its flagship nightly edition at 8:00 pm.

Between 2007 and 2008, TV9 shared time with TV Pendidikan, the national public educational TV channel. However, this was cancelled in 2009 as TV9 began daytime broadcasting while all TV Pendidikan's content moved to EduwebTV.

In May 2007, in conjunction with its first anniversary, TV9 extended its broadcasting hours from 75 hours to 85 hours a week.

On 6 September 2007, TV9, along with its sister channels TV3, NTV7, and 8TV, were made available for online viewing via Media Prima's newly-launched streaming service, Catch-Up TV, which later rebranded as Tonton.

On September 2008, TV9 was airing an ABS-CBN Studios-produced series titled Super Inggo which has dubbed in Malay.

On New Year's Day 2010, the channel launched a new tagline, Di Hatiku (At your heart in Malay), which has been used since its 3rd anniversary along 2009.

In September 2021, TV9 underwent a rebranding exercise, which saws its primetime slot moved to 6 pm onwards while its news bulletin shifted to 7 pm.

Media Prima announced on 15 October 2024 that the news operations of all of its television networks, including TV9, will began broadcast at the company's Balai Berita starting 21 October after more than two decades operated at Sri Pentas, Bandar Utama. On 12 March 2025, 15 days after the Sri Pentas building were closed, all of the company's TV networks logo, including TV9, were removed from its former building.

==== Inclusion of home shopping blocks ====
Since 1 April 2016, Media Prima included home shopping block Wow Shop (formerly known as CJ Wow Shop), a collaboration between them and Korean conglomerate CJ Group, in all of its channels' lineups, including TV9. It currently airs on this channel from 6:00 am to 8:00 pm (with buffer periods at 1:00 pm from Saturday to Thursday to accommodate Berita TV9 Tengah Hari). Such long periods of teleshopping blocks have made this channel known as a part-time TV shopping channel. This block, however, attracted huge criticism by viewers through social media due to overtaking a large part of daytime schedule, previously running mostly reruns, religious programming and children's programming. On 4 March 2018, Friday to Sunday breakfast show Nasi Lemak Kopi O (which formerly occupied the first two-hour block of CJ Wow Shop) ended its 10-year run and gave the home shopping block a weekend extension.

On 5 March 2018, TV9 revamped its programming lineup to solely focus on rural Malay communities in order to reduce viewership. Media Prima did so as part of its television revamp which saw its channels aligning with a specific core audience. Korean and English programmes aired on the channel were then transferred to the NTV7, which also revamped on the same day to serve the "Modern Malaysia" audience.

From 31 December 2018, Media Prima made a major restructuring overhaul among all of its channels, as well as few rumoured job losses. Tanyalah Ustaz and Indonesian dramas were moved to the main TV3 to extend Wow Shop's airtime starting at 6:00 AM to before afternoon news (excluding Friday) and 1:30 PM to 8:00 PM. Reruns of axed TV3 and NTV7 shows were also aired TV9 as NTV7 extended the Mandarin variant of Wow Shop's airtime. The teleshopping block became a fully owned subsidiary on 1 November 2020 after the group bought CJ's remaining 49% stake and was rebranded as simply Wow Shop.

==== Discontinuation of news afternoon slot ====
The afternoon slot of TV9 News aired its final edition on 31 October 2020 and begin to simultaneously broadcast afternoon news from TV3 on the following day.

From 15 to 30 September 2021, according to the viewership statistics from Media Prima Omnia, the viewership share for TV9 has increased from 2% to 15%, making the channel become the second most-watched television station in Malaysia after TV3 (which the viewership share for TV3 is about 17%), together with NTV7, which has the same viewership share of 15%.

==== Discontinuation of Kool FM simulcast segment ====
In December 2023, TV9 ended the Kool FM simulcast segment due to lack of listenership, replaced by Hot FM at the same scheduled time.

== Programming ==
TV9 programming consists of news, comedy, local dramas and soap operas, animated series, variety and musical shows, children's shows, talk shows, reality programs, sports and film presentations. Before Astro Oasis and TV Alhijrah came into existence, TV9 was the first TV station in the country to produce and air entirely Islamic-themed programming during its early years, where it is still continued to this day.

== Logo history ==
Channel 9 logo, used from 2003 to 2005

First logo for TV9, used from 2006 to 2011

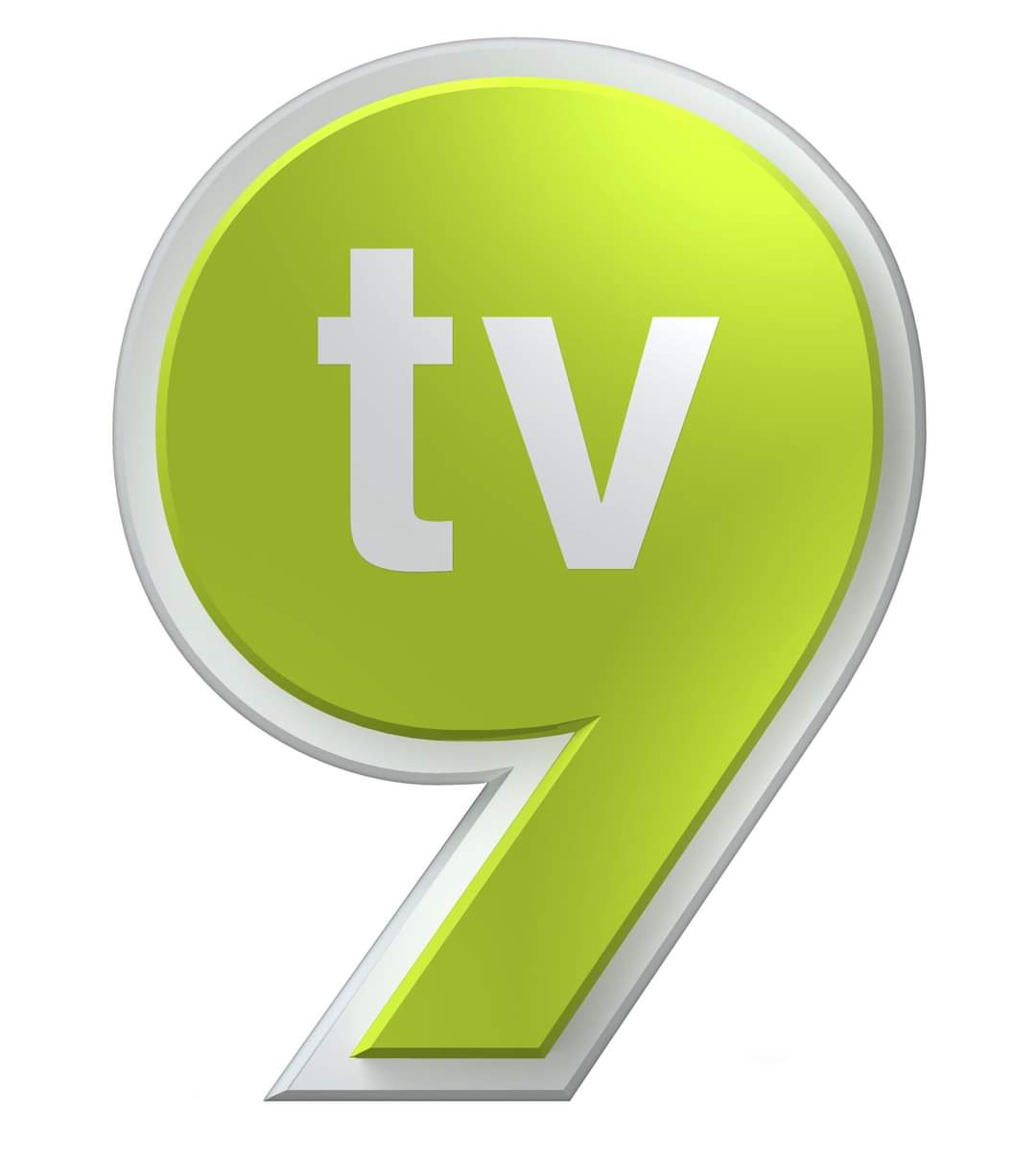
Second logo for TV9, a first iteration of the 2006 logo, used from 2011 to 2013

Third logo for TV9, a second iteration of the 2006 logo, used from 2013 to 2021

Fourth and current logo for TV9, used from 2021 to present

== See also ==
- List of television stations in Malaysia
- TV3
- DidikTV KPM
- 8TV
- Media Prima
- Wow Shop
- Drama Sangat
