= TV3 (Malaysian TV network) =

Free-to-air television channel

- Logo used since 1 June 1984
- Country: Malaysia
- Broadcast area: Malaysia; Singapore; Brunei; Thailand (South Thailand, particularly Songkhla, Narathiwat, Yala and Satun); Indonesia (North Kalimantan, West Kalimantan, East Kalimantan and Riau Islands); Philippines (particularly southern Palawan and Tawi-Tawi)
- Headquarters: Balai Berita, Bangsar, Kuala Lumpur, Malaysia

Programming
- Languages: Malay (including Malaysian and limitedly Indonesian); English; Hindi; Korean
- Picture format: 16:9 1080i HDTV (downscaled to 16:9 576i for the SDTV feed)

Ownership
- Owner: Media Prima
- Parent: Sistem Televisyen Malaysia Berhad
- Sister channels: DidikTV KPM; NTV7; 8TV; TV9; Drama Sangat

History
- Founded: 15 September 1983; 43 years ago
- Launched: 1 June 1984; 42 years ago
- Founder: Daim Zainuddin

Links
- Website: www.xtra.com.my (Merged into Tonton Xtra's site, formerly tv3.com.my)

Availability

Terrestrial
- MYTV: Channel 103 (HD)

Evolution of Media Prima
- 1974: The New Straits Times Press is founded
- 1984: TV3 is launched
- 1985: Renong Berhad acquired TV3 and NSTP from Fleet Group
- 1993: Malaysian Resources Corporation Berhad acquires TV3 and NSTP from Renong Berhad
- 1995: MetroVision is launched Mega TV began operations Akademi TV3 is founded Grand Brilliance is founded Ambang Klasik is founded
- 1998: ntv7 is launched
- 1999: MetroVision ceased operations
- 2000: Profitune is founded Akademi TV3 renamed as the Malaysia Institute of Integrative Media (MIIM); NSTP divested Berita Publishing to Alaf Positif
- 2001: Mega TV ceased operations MRCB announces its intent to divested equity interest in TV3 and NSTP and transferred them to Profitune
- 2002: Profitune renamed as Media Prima; Ambang Klasik ceased operations
- 2003: Corporate restructuring of MRCB and divestiture of TV3 and NSTP by MRCB is completed Media Prima began operations and acquires MetroVision; Channel 9 is launched TV3 divested MIIM to SAL Group of Colleges
- 2004: MetroVision is relaunched and renamed as 8TV
- 2005: Channel 9 ceased operations Media Prima acquires ntv7 and Channel 9 Fly FM is launched
- 2006: Hot FM is launched Channel 9 relaunched and renamed as TV9
- 2007: Catch-Up TV is launched Gua.com.my is launched
- 2008: Primeworks Studios is founded
- 2009: One FM is launched
- 2011: Emas is launched MIIM ceased operations
- 2012: Media Prima Digital is founded
- 2014: Emas ceased operations
- 2015: Media Prima acquires Copyright Laureate which owns Ultra FM and Pi Mai FM
- 2016: Kool FM is launched CJ Wow Shop is launched
- 2017: Media Prima acquires REV Asia Holdings; Drama Sangat is launched
- 2018: Media Prima Radio Networks rebranded as Ripple Media
- 2020: Media Prima Omnia is launched CJ Wow Shop renamed as Wow Shop
- 2021: Ripple Media rebranded as Media Prima Audio; Kool FM and One FM rebranded as Buletin FM and 8FM respectively
- 2022: Molek FM is launched
- 2023: Buletin FM rebranded as Kool 101; 8FM renamed as Eight FM
- 2025: Kool 101 reverted into Kool FM

TV3 (read as TV Tiga in Malay pronounced [tivi tiga], "TV Three" in English) is a Bangsar-based Malaysian commercial free-to-air television channel under Sistem Televisyen Malaysia Berhad owned by Malaysian media conglomerate, Media Prima.

TV3 is the third oldest TV station in Malaysia. It was launched on 1 June 1984 as the country's first and oldest private television channel. As of October 2021, TV3 remains the most-watched television station in Malaysia with about 17% viewing share among Malaysian television stations. It is followed by TV9 with 15% of viewing share. This makes the two of them the most watched television stations in the country, despite the declining viewership of the 3 free-to-air television channels.

The network is notable for opening the big doors for the launching of private TV stations in Malaysia and responsible for launching the careers of many well-known personalities in broadcasting fields. Since 2003, it also organised the Jom Heboh carnival-themed roadshow" to promote its programming. It is the dominant local Malay-language free-to-air and over-the-air television channel in Malaysia's media ecosystem.

== History ==
=== Setup ===
As early as 1976, some members of Parliament demanded the creation of a commercial television channel, but concerns were raised by the government over a potential loss of revenue from newspapers and magazines.

A license was granted to Fleet Group Sdn. Bhd., publisher of the New Straits Times owned by Daim Zainuddin, on 15 September 1983. Officials from Corporate Business Solutions (CBS) were in talks with Fleet Group executives regarding the development of broadcasting in the country. The plan was to produce 30% national content and air 70% international content, with the option to buy programmes produced by the government. Fleet Group was chosen due to its "capacity, capability and expertise". The channel, with a projected launch date of 1 January 1985, was budgeted at RM 45 million. One of the plans was to recapture urban audiences, who had escaped television in pursuit of other forms of entertainment, especially home video which ownership numbers was notable in Chinese households most affluent among all ethnic groups.

In November 1983, TV3 announced that its broadcasts would start ahead of schedule, at some point in 1984. Work for the transmitter at Bukit Besi started in February 1984, revealing the TV3 name to the public. In a surprise move, the channel later secured the rights to the 1984 Summer Olympics days later, to be held later in the year in Los Angeles. The decision still depended on whether or not the owners would start the channel on time. A prospective launch date of between June and July was then announced.

=== Beginning of operations ===
TV3 (Sistem Televisyen Malaysia Berhad) officially began broadcasting in Kuala Lumpur and the surrounding Klang Valley area on 1 June 1984 at 5:00pm local time in conjunction with the start or first day of Ramadan of the year 1404 AH. Fleet Group manager Tawfik Ismail said to The Straits Times that timing was deliberate to "create a debate to test the openness of the Malaysian society". The television channel used to broadcast from a building in Jalan Liku, Bangsar, Lembah Pantai, Kuala Lumpur before it moved to the Sri Pentas complex in Bandar Utama, Petaling Jaya, Selangor in 1995.

Initially, the channel ran for seven hours a day - 5:00pm to 12:00am relying largely on British and American-produced television series. The programming was mostly new to Malaysia, although some shows were already acquired by neighboring Singapore's own Broadcasting Corporation (SBC, now Mediacorp). The channel initially had its coverage area limited to the Klang Valley, with plans to start increasing its coverage by the end of the year. Among the shows seen on the new service were Yellow Rose, Hill Street Blues (which SBC rejected), Just Our Luck and Scarecrow and Mrs King. There was also a dedicated slot for Chinese viewers (7 to 8pm), prime-time entertainment at the time RTM's channels were airing news and related programming, and movies in the last slot before closedown. Initially the channel, despite its entertainment format, was faced with criticism over the lack of news and documentaries, while clerics believed that the channel's lack of documentaries would have an adverse influence. Facing the moral controversies the channel had suffered, the channel added prayer calls (RTM had already done for its channels) and had plans to air the main news from RTM. In order to broadcast the news, TV3 needed permission from various organisations (ABU, Asiavision, Visnews, etc.).

In late June 1984, the government was studying the effects to TV3 related to the permission of allowing private radio stations to be opened. Later in July, it was announced that TV3 was extending its signal "before long", with an estimated cost of $100 for the maintenance of three transmitting stations, with stations in Penang and Johor to relay its programming, but would also provide separate programming adhering to differences between states. The stations outside Kuala Lumpur would refuse to air content that had already been the source of controversy from conservative figures, with documentaries and related programming likely to fill in the slots. In the case of Johor, the station - which owing to the recent creation of a third VHF channel in Singapore was disabled from broadcasting on VHF) - would refuse to carry content that was already being carried by SBC's channels, due to content rights issues between the two countries. An agreement was held on 23 August to start relaying RTM news bulletins from 31 August.

By October 1984, the channel had surpassed the popularity of both RTM networks, despite its limited coverage area at the time. A survey of 25,000 people conducted by Survey Research Malaysia in September gave satisfactory results to the channel. The slot between 8 and 9pm was seen by 66.9% of the sample, whilst on weekends, the figure increased to 76.9% in the 10pm to midnight period alone. Video rental shops have been feeling the pressure of the channel, witnessing a 20% drop in sales. TV3 had also gained a shadow audience outside of the Klang Valley, with viewers in the area taping programming to relatives and friends in areas without its signal.

TV3 announced in December 1984 that its network would expand by the middle of 1985. Dual audio and stereo were to start in the Klang Valley station in January 1985. The service was the first in the region.

The separate signal for the southern end of Peninsular Malaysia - which included Singapore in its spillover area - was to get TV3 in August 1985. The lack of frequencies available on VHF prompted the station - whose line-up was separate from the Klang Valley station - to start on UHF. Within weeks TV3 showed its silence over the installation of the new station in Johor, as well as further incompatibilities with the Singaporean legal system, including tobacco advertising (which SBC outlawed) and movies in Chinese dialects other than Mandarin. As of February 1985, TV3 was still submitting a proposal to the government to install stations in Ipoh, Johor Bahru and Penang. The government approved the expansion plan in March 1985, encompassing all of West Malaysia, with the plans starting in July. Singaporean advertisers at the time were hesitant in switching to TV3, preferring to wait for the arrival of the station to Johor in order to see the results. At the end of March, equipment had arrived from Japanese company Toshiba to set up the Johor station. Negotiations were underway to find a suitable UHF frequency. Technical difficulties led to the delay of the opening of the Johor station. Consequently, the final date was settled for December 1985. The plan involved five new stations: Penang, Ipoh, Malacca, Johor and Kuantan. The initial idea of having different schedules for different states was scrapped in favor of a uniform national schedule. In addition, the youth wing of the ruling conservative UMNO party demanded the channel to shed what they perceived as its "western cosmopolitan" image in favor of one that is more "ethnic" and supportive of Malaysian identity, as well as adopting the same censorship system as the two public RTM channels.

For its first anniversary on 1 June 1985, the channel aired the 1985 Eurovision Song Contest held in Gothenburg, on a four-week delay, in primetime.

In August 1985, it was decided that the station should start in Johor on 1 November 1985.

By the end of the year, TV3 was broadcasting 60 hours a week. 10% of the programming was in Malay (main news and the current affairs magazine programme Majalah Tiga), 10% in Chinese (especially Hong Kong dramas) and the remaining 80% in English. The hour-long Cantonese drama slot attracted high advertising revenue.

Test signals in Johore started on 2 November 1985. Singapore's Housing Development Board said that it wouldn't modify its rooftop antennas to receive the new service, as it was against the Singaporean government's policy to facilitate the reception of foreign television stations. Furthermore, Singaporean newspapers wouldn't have access to listings for the channel. The Singaporean government discouraged its viewing, largely due to series using Chinese dialects other than Mandarin, which it deems detrimental.

=== Early years ===
As of August 1986, TV3 aired 32% local content compared to RTM's 65%.

TV3 began stereo broadcasts in 1987, using the German system. Despite the scarcity of stereo programmes in the market, TV3 has managed to make programmes in mono audio sound like stereo by splitting the mono sounds with a special synthesizer.

In January 1987, Fleet Holdings transferred its 30% stake in STMB to the NSTP in exchange for M$33.75 million. The NSTP's control over the company increased to 40%. Later in the month, it expanded its stake to 70%. An underwriting agreement with several local banks for its public listing was held on 26 January 1988. The station was listed at the Kuala Lumpur Stock Exchange (now Bursa Malaysia) for the first time on 25 April 1988. In December 1987, TV3 began running its in-house produced 41-second public service announcement spot on AIDS, featuring the voice of Nassier Rahman. The spot aired eleven times between programmes since it started. It ran concurrently with competitor RTM's, which ran for 45 seconds and air once a day on its television channels. TV3 launched its own breakfast programme Sekapur Sirih ("Lime and Betel") for Sundays on 30 August 1987 extending its airtime early to 9 AM, this was followed by Seulas Pinang ("A Slice of Areca") for Fridays later in 1992.

TV3 started broadcasting to Sarawak in 1988. Initially it was scheduled for 26 August but technical problems delayed its launch there by a few days.

TV3 expanded to central Kelantan, Kota Kinabalu and central Pahang in 1989.

TV3 had its near-debut in the food business in November 1988 with the acquisition of some of Cold Storage's shares but did not materialise because the receipt of approval did not reach the authorities at that time.

In May 1989, representatives of MCA Youth met with TV3's management on whether to air Chinese news on TV3, despite its shortage of Mandarin-speaking staff. The Young Malaysian Movement launched a boycott on TV3 in January 1990 to urge Malaysian Chinese to stop watching the channel and ask all TV channels to air news in the languages of Malaysia's three main races. The boycott would also be supported by MCA Youth as well. In June 1990, MCA Youth gave TV3 a 10-day ultimatum to decide whether to broadcast the news in Mandarin. Meanwhile, RTM had planned to air its Mandarin news broadcast on TV3; however the decision was left to TV3 on whether to air it.

=== 1990s: expansion outside Klang Valley, acquisitions ===
By 1990, half of TV3's programmes are in Malay, as required by government regulations.

TV3's sports programmes in 1990 consist of American football, the 1990 Super Bowl and Italian soccer, competing with RTM's 1990 Commonwealth Games.

During the 1990 general election campaign, TV3 was the only TV crew among the thirty local and foreign newsmen in the Semangat 46 party manifesto reveal. The party's leader refused to allow his voice to appear in news reports but have the crew film the ceremony.

TV3 expanded to Seremban, Bukit Fraser and two more sites in Sabah in 1991 and Mersing, Johor and Miri, Sarawak in late 1992.

The New Straits Times Press through its employees Abdul Kadir Jasin and Khalid Ahmad bought TV3 in a management buyout in 1993. In January 1994, TV3 entered the mini-cinema business with the 60% acquisition of Power Annex Sdn Bhd, a local film distributor and cinema franchise company. The following month, TV3 entered the local film industry by acquiring rights to a local film produced by Penglipur Lara Sdn Bhd and Televisual Sdn Bhd.

On 1 March 1994, TV3 introduced full-time morning broadcasts, along with rival TV1. Among its programmes include Buletin Awal, which started at 6 am, a morning edition of Business News, and Malaysia Hari Ini ("Malaysia Today") subsuming both Sekapur Sirih and Seulas Pinang on March 28th with its initial presenter lineup of Mahadzir Lokman, Christine Ling, Aziz Desa and Hasbullah Awang. Complementing the programmes were a review of major newspapers, weather reports and traffic updates with the Kuala Lumpur City Hall and traffic police.

TV3 had at least one hour a week of local Chinese drama in 1994. In September, it was announced that Singapore Cable Vision's then-upcoming cable network would carry the channel from 1995, ending the government's arms-length stance since its beginning.

On 1 July 1995, TV3 along with Indonesian station RCTI launched Citra Nusantara, airing Saturdays at 8 am, "providing topical insights" of Malaysia and Indonesia. On 1 September 1995, TV3 extended its broadcasting hours to 1 am on weekdays and 2 am on Saturday and Sunday weekends instead of 12 am and 1 am respectively.

In 1996, TV3 set up its four subsidiaries in Ghana including TV3 Ghana in which it owns a 52.5% of equity stake for each of these subsidiaries.

In 1997, TV3 and MetroVision was ordered by the Ministry of Information to relocate their transmitters to the Kuala Lumpur Tower.

TV3 began 24 hour broadcasting on 31 August 1997 after the government realised that cable and satellite television stations that operate 24 hours have no negative effect to the population, something the government previously sceptical about for productivity reasons. TV3 had plans to start a second channel by the name of TV9 in 1997, unrelated to the present-day TV9. The application had yet to be received by the Information Ministry.

In April 1998, TV3 and MRCB agreed to build studios and audiotorium in Shah Alam, costing RM 7.2 million and planned to be completed on 31 October 1998. TV3 would be the sole user of such facilities. MRCB will receive RM1.7 million from TV3's advertising income.

In November 1998, TV3 decided to reduce its broadcast hours to just 12 hours for Mondays to Thursdays instead of 20 hours starting next month.In the financial results of MRCB ending 31 August 1998, TV3 recorded a loss of RM 82 million.

TV3 become the first TV station in Malaysia and the Asian region when it introduces a 3D broadcast in 2001 for some of its programmes and international films. It also held a charity campaign known as Kurniaan Harapan (A Gift of Hope) in collaboration with the Tun Hussein Onn National Eye Hospital and the Malaysian Association for the Blind (MAB) to raised funds for the visually-impaired. To coincide with the campaign, a 3D spectacles was on sale at selected Caltex, 7-Eleven, Courts Mammoth and TOPS outlets. The campaign took place from 28 January to 26 February 2001.

=== 2000s: conglomeration, venture into streaming ===
On 22 September 2003, both Sistem Televisyen Malaysia Berhad and The New Straits Times Press (Malaysia) Berhad were spun off from Malaysian Resources Corporation Berhad (MRCB), in which the latter had acquired from Renong Berhad in 1993 to form Media Prima Berhad.

In 2004, TV3 celebrates its 20th anniversary and concurrently reintroduced 24-hour broadcast time, which has introduced a year before, in 2003.

On 6 September 2007, TV3 along with its sister channels, NTV7, 8TV and TV9 made available for online viewing via Media Prima's newly launched streaming service, Catch-Up TV, which later rebranded as Tonton.

In 2008, TV3 through programs produced by it, dominates the list of 20 programs with higher viewership. During the Eid-ul-Fitr celebration in 2009, TV3 dominated 30 percent of entire viewership.

In the first quarter of 2013, TV3 commands a 26% of market share in television audience.

On 1 June 2024, TV3 celebrated its 40th anniversary. It also organised an event called Immersio: Inspirasi Generasi By TV3, which took place at the Telekom Museum prior to its anniversary celebration.

Media Prima announced on 15 October 2024 that the news operations of all of its television networks, including TV3, will began broadcast at the company's Balai Berita starting 21 October after more than two decades operated at Sri Pentas, Bandar Utama. On 12 March 2025, 15 days after the Sri Pentas building were closed, all of the company's TV networks logo, including TV3, were removed from its former building.

== Criticism and controversies ==
=== Language issues ===
==== Dialect affair in Singapore ====
In Singapore, the barely launched channel ran into controversy because it broadcast programmes in Cantonese, which ran contrary to the Singapore government's policy of promoting Mandarin over other Sinitic languages (that the government deems "dialects") in media. Consequently, it prevented people in government-built housing blocks from installing the special antennas required to receive the channel. In addition, it prevented local newspapers and magazines from carrying listings for TV3, even though these were available for the other Malaysian channels. This was seen as a threat to the flow of information between the two countries, and that it undermined Singaporean perceptions of Malaysia's developing society. The Straits Times defended its argument over not publishing listings for the channel, as, contrary to RTM's two channels, whose schedules were published from the start, TV3 was excluded due to the government's policy against facilitating access to foreign television channels.

Reactions from viewers over the initial decision to boycott the channel were mostly negative, with unusual cases of relatives taping TV3 broadcasts for rent, obtaining the channel's listings from Johor on purpose and that, in the words of its director general Mohamad Noor Saleh, Singaporean media was over-reacting the situation. Hotels were already studying the possibility of installing UHF antennas capable of receiving the signal. The Workers' Party suggested the government to revise the policy, while still not understanding the rationale behind the decision, and that the move would discourage competition from SBC's channels. TV3 refused to make any representation to Singaporean authorities under the claim that the channel was strictly aimed at Malaysian audiences.

TV3 was available on Singapore CableVision (now StarHub TV), Singapore's only cable TV operator from the beginning, however on 9 May 2001, following a copyright ruling that was enacted in December 1999, it had its broadcasting hours cut from 11:30 am to 9 pm which US-made TV shows and movies would be aired during this time, and which Singapore lacked clearances for. It finally was removed at 9pm, 22 July 2002 owing to copyright issues.

==== Preference of English over Malay programming ====
On 8 December 1984, Anwar Ibrahim, then chief of the youth wing of UMNO condemned the channel's approach and its preference for English programming over Malay.

=== Screening of Against the Odds episode about Golda Meir ===
An episode of the American documentary series Against the Odds profiling former Israeli prime minister Golda Meir was inadvertently broadcast on 18 April 1985. The station apologised for the showing, and a spokesman for the network was "deeply regretted". The mistake came from an unusual taking of one of the films that were not submitted for approval at the time by the Film Censorship Board. Israel and Malaysia does not maintain diplomatic ties (due to the latter's relations with Palestine) and the government has historically restricted any content depicting Israel as a legitimate country.

=== Moral controversies ===
According to the Asia Wall Street Journal, as soon as TV3 started broadcasting, the channel was put under pressure from Muslim fundamentalists over a growing concern that the channel promoted an "open society" that eroded national values. The Malaysian Islamic Youth Movement strongly condemned the American series seen on the network, knowing that they were "detrimental to the Eastern social ethics", but that would "also destroy Islamic values". Its secretary-general Kamaruddin Jaafar demanded that TV3 should stop airing Western shows and introduce religious and educational programmes in their place. At the time, a television critic said that, if the pressure from religious leaders increased, the channel would remove Solid Gold from its schedule.

In 2007, live reality television programme broadcast Sensasi was taken off the air following an episode on the topic of older women courting younger men, where guest actress Rosnah Mat Aris supposedly compared the situation to Muhammad's marriage with Khadijah, as well as accusations that host Awal Ashaari was "humiliating a person to sensationalise the issue". Another reality television show, Teleskop, was banned in 1995 after panellist Nasir Jani's swearing towards Prime Minister at the time, Mahathir Mohamad on air.

=== Advertisement research failure ===
In 2010, TV3 broadcast a Hari Raya Aidilfitri advertisement featuring an old man on a flying trishaw and blooming lotus-like flowers, reminiscent of motifs from Christian and Hindu holidays. This sparked an outcry, like politician Zulkifli Noordin who accused it of "humiliating and insulting Islam". The advertisement was withdrawn after just a few days and TV3 was fined MYR50,000 for the broadcast, in addition to issuing an on-air apology.

=== Airing of Into the Wild ===
On 24 March 2012, TV3 aired a 2007 American film, Into the Wild which stars Emile Hirsch, in which he displays his genitals openly in one of the film's scene. TV3 apologized for the showing of the film's indescent scene to Malaysian viewers, while stated that it "acquiesce to the mistakes that occur that cause objections from several parties".

=== Suspicions of plagiarism from foreign broadcasters ===
In 2015, TV3 was accused of plagiarism, after it was revealed that its new news design, intro and theme song was copied from the Dutch RTL Nieuws, which had introduced its new news design in May 2014.. 2 years later, TV3 revised the intro and news design (but the theme song is retained until 4 years later).

In 2019, TV3 was accused of plagiarism once again. This time, the logo, news design and intro was copied from Norway NRK Nyheter, which had introduced its new news design on 1 June 2014.

=== Home shopping overtaking regular programming ===
From 1 April 2016 to 31 December 2016, a teleshopping block in collaboration with Korean conglomerate CJ Group named CJ Wow Shop was broadcast across all Media Prima channels. Some of the conglomerate's channels (especially NTV7, 8TV and TV9) were more affected by the changes. This block attracted huge criticism on social media as it took a large part of daytime schedule previously filled by children's programming and religious programming. CJ Wow Shop was renamed as Wow Shop on 1 November 2020.

=== Anti-queer censorship ===
In August 1994, TV3 management were ordered by the Information Minister, Mohamed Rahmat to ban appearances of khunsa (intersex people) and "cross-dressing men" (pondan) from appearing in any of their programmes; the minister had alleged their appearances were "influenced by bad culture practiced by the Western communities". The launch of TV3 itself led to the Broadcasting Act of 1988 under Mahathir Mohamad's tenure which allowed full government monitoring over all future private broadcasting in Malaysia.

The inaugural edition of the Eurovision Song Contest Asia, which TV3 carried the Malaysian broadcast rights to, aired on 14 November 2026. During the live broadcast, TV3 replaced drag performers in the opening number with wider shots of the stage taken from the Philippine celebrities Vice Ganda spoke with a contest graphic, causing viewers to see only the results table. ESC Asia organisers have set up contact with the channel to explain the circumstances.

== See also ==
- List of television stations in Malaysia
- DidikTV KPM
- 8TV
- TV9
- Media Prima
- Drama Sangat
