= Media Prima =

Malaysian integrated media company

Media Prima Berhad
- Logo used since 23 September 2003
- Formerly: Profitune Berhad (2000–2002)
- Type: Public limited company
- Traded as: MYX: 4502
- ISIN: MYL4502OO000
- Industry: Mass media; Entertainment
- Founded: 27 November 2000; 25 years ago
- Headquarters: Balai Berita, Bangsar, Kuala Lumpur, Malaysia
- Key people: Datuk (Dr) Syed Hussein bin Syed Junid; (Chairman); Rafiq Razali; (Group Managing Director)
- Services: Television broadcasting; Radio network; Print media; Advertising; Music industry; Production house
- Revenue: ▲RM 8.81 billion
- Net income: ▲RM 95.7 million
- Owners: Aurora Mulia (31.9%); JAG Capital Holdings (20.1%); Morgan Stanley & Co. Int. (11.0%)
- Number of employees: 6,187 (December 2023)
- Divisions: Media Prima Content & TV Networks; Media Prima Audio
- Subsidiaries: Media Prima Omnia; Alternate Records & Talents; New Straits Times Press; Big Tree Outdoor; REV Media Group
- Website: www.mediaprima.com.my

Evolution of Media Prima
- 1974: The New Straits Times Press is founded
- 1984: TV3 is launched
- 1985: Renong Berhad acquired TV3 and NSTP from Fleet Group
- 1993: Malaysian Resources Corporation Berhad acquires TV3 and NSTP from Renong Berhad
- 1995: MetroVision is launched Mega TV began operations Akademi TV3 is founded Grand Brilliance is founded Ambang Klasik is founded
- 1998: ntv7 is launched
- 1999: MetroVision ceased operations
- 2000: Profitune is founded Akademi TV3 renamed as the Malaysia Institute of Integrative Media (MIIM); NSTP divested Berita Publishing to Alaf Positif
- 2001: Mega TV ceased operations MRCB announces its intent to divested equity interest in TV3 and NSTP and transferred them to Profitune
- 2002: Profitune renamed as Media Prima; Ambang Klasik ceased operations
- 2003: Corporate restructuring of MRCB and divestiture of TV3 and NSTP by MRCB is completed Media Prima began operations and acquires MetroVision; Channel 9 is launched TV3 divested MIIM to SAL Group of Colleges
- 2004: MetroVision is relaunched and renamed as 8TV
- 2005: Channel 9 ceased operations Media Prima acquires ntv7 and Channel 9 Fly FM is launched
- 2006: Hot FM is launched Channel 9 relaunched and renamed as TV9
- 2007: Catch-Up TV is launched Gua.com.my is launched
- 2008: Primeworks Studios is founded
- 2009: One FM is launched
- 2011: Emas is launched MIIM ceased operations
- 2012: Media Prima Digital is founded
- 2014: Emas ceased operations
- 2015: Media Prima acquires Copyright Laureate which owns Ultra FM and Pi Mai FM
- 2016: Kool FM is launched CJ Wow Shop is launched
- 2017: Media Prima acquires REV Asia Holdings; Drama Sangat is launched
- 2018: Media Prima Radio Networks rebranded as Ripple Media
- 2020: Media Prima Omnia is launched CJ Wow Shop renamed as Wow Shop
- 2021: Ripple Media rebranded as Media Prima Audio; Kool FM and One FM rebranded as Buletin FM and 8FM respectively
- 2022: Molek FM is launched
- 2023: Buletin FM rebranded as Kool 101; 8FM renamed as Eight FM
- 2025: Kool 101 reverted into Kool FM

Media Prima Berhad is a Malaysian media company based in Bangsar, Kuala Lumpur. It is the largest media and entertainment conglomerate in Malaysia with business interests in television, print, radio, out-of-home advertising, content creation, and digital media. As of 2023, Media Prima employs over 6,000 staff in total, of whom approximately 1,300 are in private-sector broadcasting. The company forms half of the mass media duopoly in the country along with Astro.

Established in 2000 as Profitune Sdn Bhd and originally started out as a multimedia company, Media Prima evolved to its current state with its present name in 2002 and began operations a year later after the demerger of Malaysian Resources Corporation Berhad's (MRCB) media assets. The company operates four television channels — TV3, NTV7, 8TV, and TV9, and also five radio stations – Kool 101, Fly FM, Eight FM, Hot FM, and Molek FM, as well as an over-the-top streaming service, tonton. Media Prima is also the owner of the New Straits Times Press, Malaysia's largest newspaper publisher with three national news brands – the New Straits Times, Berita Harian, and Harian Metro.

Primeworks Studios, Media Prima's commercial subsidiary, responsible in produces, distributes and sells Media Prima TV networks' programs as well as helps to generate funding for content provision and also distributes TV3's online news service, Buletin TV3. The company currently ranks third in Malaysia in digital reach following the 2017 acquisition of REV Asia Holdings (now Catcha Digital), one of Southeast Asia's leading digital media groups. In 2018, Media Prima became the number one choice for mobile content ahead of Google and Facebook.

== Background ==
Media Prima traced its roots and origins from the Malaysian operations division of Singaporean company The Straits Times Press Group, the forerunner of SPH Media. Prior to its establishment, both The New Straits Times Press and Sistem Televisyen Malaysia Berhad were formerly a subsidiaries of Fleet Holdings, an investment arm of United Malays National Organisation (UMNO) and helmed by Junus Sudin. Fleet Holdings had acquired its ownership of the Malaysian operations of The Straits Times Press Group, which consisting of the Malaysian editions of The Straits Times and Berita Harian as well as the Malay Mail, in September 1972. Following the acquisition, Fleet Holdings transferred these assets to the new company, and renamed it as the NSTP on 31 January 1973.

In 1983, the company granted a license from the Malaysian Government to operate Malaysia's first private television station, TV3, which began operations on 1 June 1984, ending the monopoly of Government-owned TV stations. It later divested its ownership of the NSTP and TV3 to Renong Berhad, a company helmed by Halim Saad in 1988. In 1993, four senior managements of Realmild Sdn Bhd held a management buyout which led Renong in turn, divested its shares in the NSTP and TV3. Subsequently, both of the companies were acquired by Malaysian Resources Corporation Berhad (MRCB), which primarily focused on construction and property development as its main core businesses. The acquisition was completed on June 25, 1993 as part of the MRCB's foray into other business and considered the largest management buyout in Malaysian corporate history. Before Media Prima was created, TV3 led a consortium to set up Malaysia's first pay-TV operator, Mega TV, which was launched in 1994 and started operations a year later, in 1995. In 1998, TV3 and MRCB agreed to build a studio facility and an auditorium in Shah Alam, Selangor, costing RM 7.2 million and planned to be completed on 31 October. TV3 would be the sole user of such facilities, while MRCB will receive RM1.7 million from the latter's advertising income.

== History ==
=== 2000–2009: Formation and early history ===
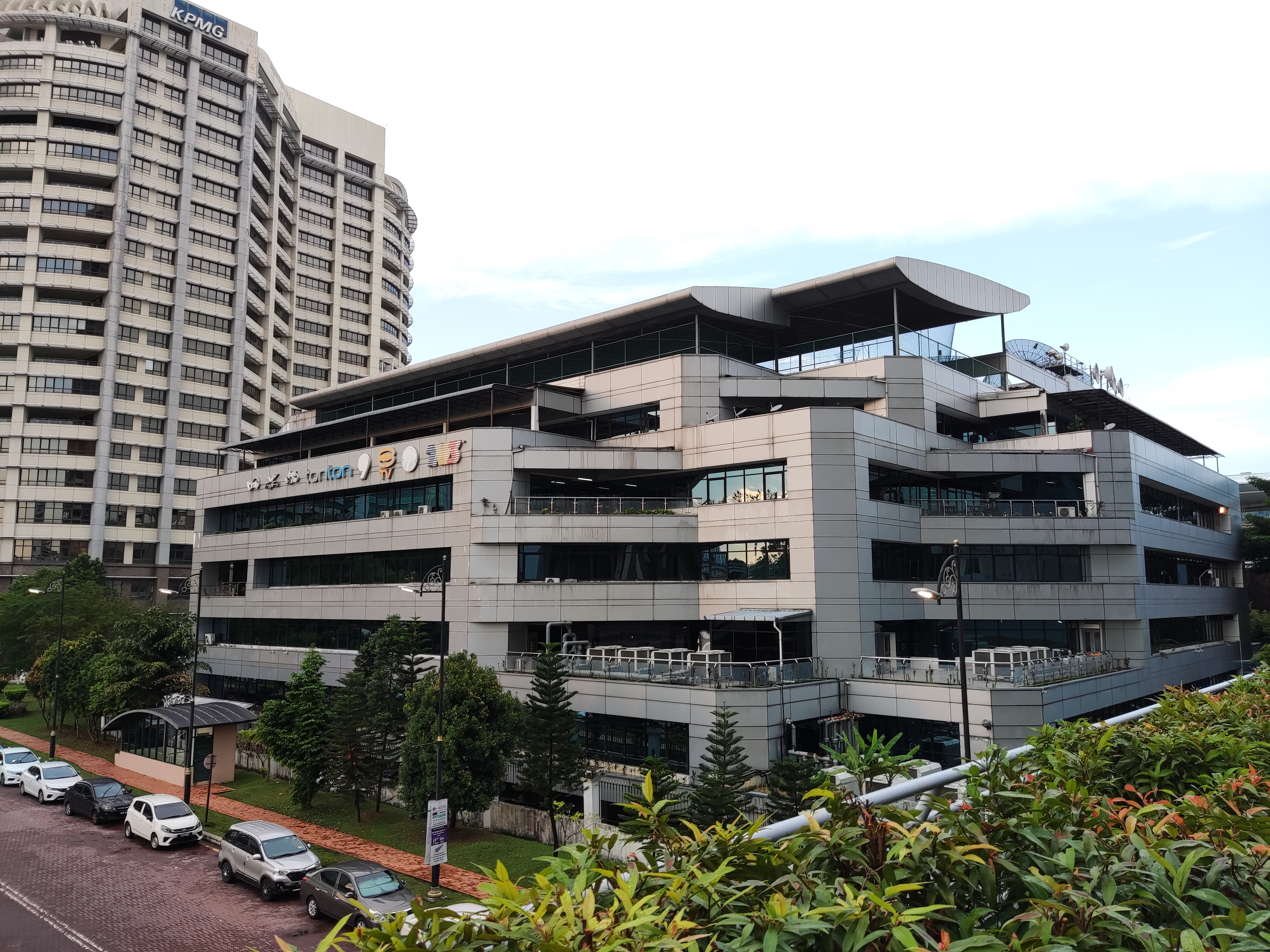
Former Media Prima headquarters at Sri Pentas in Bandar Utama, Petaling Jaya, Selangor. It has been vacated and closed since the end of February 2025 after the relocation phase of its staffs and properties from Sri Pentas to Balai Berita, Bangsar, Kuala Lumpur completed.

Media Prima was established on 27 November 2000 as Profitune Sdn. Bhd., with a focus on multimedia and communications services. On 1 October 2001, MRCB announced that it proposed to divested its equity interest in its media subsidiaries, Sistem Televisyen Malaysia Berhad (STMB) and The New Straits Times Press (Malaysia) Berhad (NSTP), in which the latter had acquired from Renong Berhad in 1993 and shutting down its pay-TV unit, Mega TV to help repay RM1 million of debt. The proposed restructuring scheme was officially announced on 8 October. MRCB and Profitune inked a share sale agreement on 22 October in which the company will assume the listing status of TV3. The divestiture is part of the MRCB's reorganization plan, which saw its media business were transferred to Profitune while MRCB focused solely on infrastructure and construction business. The company was upgraded into a public limited company status and renamed as Profitune Berhad on 7 November 2001.

In January 2002, following the reduction of assumed TV3's debt, MRCB revised the purchase consideration of its debt restructuring scheme. The restructuring was expected to be completed in the third quarter of the year.

On 10 June 2002, Profitune shifted its business focus to media and entertainment and changed its name to Media Prima in preparation for media competition in Malaysia. On 25 November, the company signed a second supplemental agreement with MRCB for another proposal which concerning the NSTP.

In late July 2003, the MRCB obtained a sanction from the High Court that allowed it to proceed the demerger exercise with Media Prima and lodged a court order's copy with the Companies Commission of Malaysia (SSM). It also issued a circular to its shareholders on the demerger.

The corporate restructuring of MRCB and the spin-out of its media assets, namely TV3 and the NSTP was formally completed in August 2003, and the following month, MRCB spin-offs TV3 and the NSTP, marking the latter's official exit from media business.

Media Prima began operations on 23 September 2003, with the launching ceremony was officiated by the then-Deputy Prime Minister, Abdullah Ahmad Badawi. At the same time, the company unveiled its first corporate logo (which continued to be used to this day same as TV3), which saws the word 'Media' placed in the red box, while the word 'Prima' placed outside the red box. On 22 October, the company takes over the listing status of the STMB on the Main Board of Bursa Malaysia Securities Berhad.

Not long after, Media Prima acquired 80% interest in Metropolitan TV Sdn Bhd which had a Content Application Service Provider (CASP) license which allowed it to open a television station. On January 8, 2004, 8TV was relaunched as a successor of MetroVision which was closed in November 1999. In June 2005, Media Prima acquired 100% stake in Ch-9 Media, which operates Channel 9 in a RM40.61 million deal and renamed it as TV9. In July, the company entered into a Collaboration and Assistance Agreement with Natseven TV Sdn Bhd (which operates ntv7), Synchrosound Studio Sdn Bhd (which operates now-defunct Wow FM), Questseven Dot Com Sdn Bhd and the respective companies' shareholders to provide assistance for the companies to undertake a corporate and debt restructuring scheme. On October 27, Media Prima acquired 100% stake in Natseven TV for RM90 million. The acquisition increased the company's television viewership market share to 48%, making Media Prima the owner of all free-to-air private television networks in Malaysia.

In November 2006, Media Prima acquires 70% stake in Big Tree Outdoor, followed by the entire stakes in two other outdoor advertising firms, namely UPD and The Right Channel. By December, the company became one of the main components of the Bursa Malaysia's Composite Index.

In 2007, Media Prima launches its over-the-top streaming service, Catch-Up TV, which offers content from the company's television channels and their respective websites. The company also launched an Internet portal, gua.com.my and its music portal, guamuzik.com.my. The company also planned to expand its business operations abroad in order to be the major "regional media powerhouse".

Also in 2007, Media Prima dominates 54% of television viewership market in Malaysia, after Astro (29%) and Radio Televisyen Malaysia (17%).

In 2008, Media Prima established its subsidiary in the Philippines, MPB Primedia Inc. in partnership with the ABC Development Corporation (now TV5 Network) to relaunch the TV5 with new image with US$150 million media funding provided by the company. However, in October 2009, the company decided to divest its 70% of its shares in MPB Primedia to PLDT's subsidiary MediaQuest Holdings to prevent the liquidity of profits on the company's behalf. Also, in 2008, Media Prima launched a new subsidiary, Primeworks Studios to oversee productions of all Media Prima's television networks while promotes Malaysian TV programs to international markets.

The company announced in February 2009 that it would enter a partnership with the Islamic Republic of Iran Broadcasting for the television program exchange.

=== 2009–2014: Expansion of business operations ===
In March, Media Prima was among 6 ASEAN broadcasting companies including Mediacorp, Media Nusantara Citra (MNC) and ABS-CBN Corporation jointly to form a regional broadcasting alliance, Smart Alliance to carry out an alliance to cooperate in three areas—content, sales and marketing, and technology—and take advantage of economies of scale and combined markets that the region can offer. In October, the company signed a multi-year deal with The Walt Disney Company's integrated distribution subsidiary, Disney-ABC International Television (DAIT) Asia Pacific, which encompasses of ABC Studios programs for TV3, NTV7 and 8TV. At the same time, the company considering its offer to take over the New Straits Times Press through a share swap to formed the largest media group.

The company, through its wholly owned subsidiary Gama Media International (BVI) Ltd., began to divest 90% of its equity stake in Ghanaian television network, TV3 Ghana in the third quarter of 2011 and sold to Ghanaian media firm, Media General Ghana Ltd.

Media Prima signed a memorandum of understanding (MoU) with Malaysia Digital Economy Corporation (MDEC) for three-year term to promote initiatives related to the creative industry implemented through the National ICT Initiative via MSC Malaysia.

On 14 December 2012, Media Prima launched its expanded digital business unit as Media Prima Digital. The reorganization is part of the company's wider strategy to align and optimize its existing digital business across multiple platforms.

The company is among of 20 strategic partners of the Universiti Utara Malaysia's Bachelor of Creative Industry Management (BCIM) program which was introduced on 20 August 2013.

In 2014, Media Prima began collaborating with the Universiti Sains Malaysia to provide Malay subtitles for the hearing-impaired, initially for TV3 and TV9's Islamic programming including Kopi Bersama Ustaz Kazim and Fiqh Wanita, whose programmes were reported to have reached 100,000 viewers when they were aired with subtitles. The subtitles were provided by the university's undergraduate students in translation and interpretation.

=== 2014–present: Recent developments ===
The company announced in November 2014 that it would reduce the number of employees by offering them a one-time payment. According to its statement, the mutual separation scheme (MSS) will be implemented from 14 November and completed on 15 December.

The company entered a conditional purchase agreement as early as October 2015 to acquire the entire stake of radio broadcasting company, Copyright Laureate, which owns and operates Ultra FM and Pi Mai FM, in a cash consideration of RM20 million. The acquisition was completed on 21 October.

In early 2016, Media Prima signed a deal with South Korean company CJ Group to launch a home shopping channel, CJ Wow Shop and operated by the companies' joint-venture, MP CJ O Shopping Sdn. Bhd. By November 2016, the company began to restructure its printing operations and gave more priority to digital initiatives. Its podcast platform, Ais Kacang was launched on 1 April 2017. The podcast then rebranded as Audio+ 4 years later, in 2021.

In May 2017, Media Prima announced that it has reached an agreement to acquire new media startup Rev Asia for RM105 million, or about $24.2 million. The agreement will see Rev Asia being integrated into the company's platform to create the nation's largest digital media entity. The company inked a collaboration with Singaporean game developer, Garena in December 2017 to promote eSports in Malaysia, in which Media Prima aimed to "deliver news from events and tournaments as well as game-related updates through its TV networks as well as social media channels".

In June 2018, Media Prima through its subsidiary, Rev Asia Holdings announced that it had acquired a 52% equity stake in Vocket Media Sdn Bhd worth RM2.6 million. The acquisition also simultaneously makes Vocket another new subsidiary of Media Prima.

Two months later, the company has entered a partnership with YouTube through its "Players for Publishers" service to strengthen its position in the digital media industry in Malaysia. Through the partnership, high-quality video content produced by Media Prima including from television networks, radio, the NSTP and Media Prima Digital will be available on the platform.

By August 2018, Media Prima has reportedly sold the New Straits Times Press' Balai Berita site in Bangsar and the land where its printing factory is located in Shah Alam to PNB Development Sdn Bhd for RM280 million. This is the second major asset disposed by the company after selling a 21.36% stake to Malaysian Newsprint Industries (MNI; now Asia Honour Paper Industries) for a cash consideration of RM45.4 million on 2 May. The company will move its operations from Sri Pentas in Bandar Utama, which has been operated since the 1990s. One of the premises the group is considering moving to is at Saujana Resort, Seksyen U2, Shah Alam, which is owned by Pelaburan Hartanah Bhd. In September, the company received sponsorship from the Perak State Government to provide coverage for the 2018 Malaysia Games (SUKMA 2018).

Media Prima signs an MoU with Dailymotion on 22 October 2018 to expand digital reach and improving contents for Malaysian audiences. The company alongside Astro and DiGi Telecommunications collaborated to launch a digital learning hub, known as JomStudi in January 2019. The initiative, which supported by the Malaysia Digital Economy Corporation (MDEC), provides quality educational resources in a single platform which accessible to students.

On 9 April 2019, Media Prima partnered with Grabyo to enhance its social video strategy and increase its dominance in the Malaysian digital content market. Few days later, Media Prima entered a digital partnership with iflix for free catch-up TV, shortly after the latter signed a similar partnership with JTBC Content Hub, the content distribution arm of South Korean media company JTBC. As part of the partnership, the company will make more than 1,000 hours of content from its library through exclusive Tonton-branded channels on the platform to increase Malaysia's local content offering.

In April 2020, Media Prima consolidated its advertising functions in different business segments into a new subsidiary called Media Prima Omnia. On 1 November 2020, Media Prima acquired the remaining 49% stake in CJ Wow Shop from CJ Group and renamed it as Wow Shop. The acquisition is part of its plan to capitalize on the strong prospects of the home shopping and e-commerce industry.

In July 2021, the company reacquired its Bangsar headquarters, the Balai Berita from PNB Development in a RM156.4 million deal. Media Prima collaborated with Celcom Axiata and South Korean telecom company, LG Uplus Corp in October 2021 to exploring the potential 5G content and services cutting across VR and AR for Malaysian market.

The company, through its content production and commercial arm, Primeworks Studios, partnered with South Korean broadcasting company, Seoul Broadcasting System (SBS) to produce the Malaysian version of the Korean reality show, Master in the House. The program premiered on TV3 on 15 January 2022. The company entered a strategic partnership with the Malaysian Anti-Corruption Commission in August 2022 in their effort to broadening an anti-corruption program.

In November, Media Prima began collaborating with Chinese television network Hunan Broadcasting System to co-produce programmes as well as broadcast the latter's produced content.

In June 2023, the company become an official media partner for Visit Melaka Year 2024 campaign.

The company was named as a strategic media partner for the Malaysia-China Macro Entrepreneur Health Forum and the Asian Celebrity Charity Gala Night 2023 (MCEH 2023) which took place on 25 and 26 November 2023 at The Majestic Hotel, Kuala Lumpur.

The company planned to utilize the artificial intelligence (AI) technology for all of its operations by the year-end. Media Prima announced on 15 October 2024 that the news operations of all of its television networks will began broadcast at the company's Balai Berita in Jalan Riong, Bangsar starting 21 October after more than two decades operated at Sri Pentas, Bandar Utama.

In January 2025, Media Prima through its Television Networks subsidiary launched a new version of Azan the Islamic call to prayer, which was enhanced by artificial intelligence (AI). The updated call to prayer was aired for the first time during the Zohor prayers on 15 January, with Sheikh Abdul Karim Umar Al Makki reciting it.

The company announced that its Sri Pentas headquarters, that serves as an operational centre for its TV and radio operations, has officially closed on 25 February 2025, marking the end of the 3 decade run of the latter's broadcasting operations following the completion of the final relocation phase of all of its staffs from Sri Pentas to Balai Berita, on 17 February. On 12 March, all of the company's TV networks logos were removed from Sri Pentas building.

In May 2025, Media Prima inked a strategic partnership with the Association of Chartered Certified Accountants (ACCA) and become its Approved Employer. The partnership is said to "enhance professional development" within the company's "finance and accountancy teams".

The company launches a nationwids social initiative called Ruang Rehat, which was run from June to October 2026, that aimed to normalise taking breaks and caring for one's mental wellbeing.

== Institutional ownership ==
In September 2019, Malaysian tycoon Syed Mokhtar Albukhary, through his company Aurora Mulia Sdn Bhd, acquired a 31.22% share in Media Prima. 19.05% was purchased from the United Malays National Organisation (UMNO). Additionally, Mitsubishi UFJ Financial Group's 12.84% stake is believed to be held on behalf of Syed Mokthar.

In 2021, UMNO politician Johari Abdul Ghani, through his investment company JAG Capital Holdings, acquired a 20.08% share, becoming Media Prima's second-largest shareholder. Other shareholders include Morgan Stanley & Co. Int. and Mitsubishi UFJ Financial Group.

== Assets and subsidiaries ==
Media Prima owns major of media and entertainment companies in Malaysia, and has a multiple services and products such as television and radio broadcast, content production, program and film distributor, television production, film production, advertising, print publication, new media and digital platforms and music label and recording. Under its TV broadcasting subsidiary, Media Prima TV Networks, the company operates four terrestrial TV networks – TV3, NTV7, 8TV, TV9, an educational TV channel, DidikTV KPM and a home shopping channel, Wow Shop (formerly CJ Wow Shop) as well as five radio stations under its radio broadcasting subsidiary, Media Prima Audio (formerly Media Prima Radio Networks and later Ripple) – Kool FM (briefly Buletin FM and Kool 101), Fly FM, Eight FM (formerly One FM and later 8FM), Hot FM and Molek FM as well as a podcast platform Audio+ (formerly Ais Kacang).

Other companies that operate under the Media Prima group are print publishing subsidiary the New Straits Times Press–in which the company owns more than 98% of equity interests–which owns three major print and online news brands the New Straits Times, Berita Harian and Harian Metro and their respective weekend editions as well as online newspaper archive KLiK (formerly NSTP e-Media and later News & Image Bank or NIB). It also owned printing subsidiary Print Towers, tertiary education reference website Mind Campus and learning portal FullAMark; commercial subsidiary, Primeworks Studios that provides content output in diverse categories covering television, cinema, and digital platforms; new media subsidiary Catcha Digital (formerly Alt Media and later Media Prima Digital, then REV Media Group) which owns the Tonton streaming service and multiple online portals such as Oh Bulan!, MyResipi, Vocket, Mashable SEA and TechNave; integrated solution provider Media Prima Omnia (or simply Omnia) which offers creative services and integrated marketing solutions across all the company's platforms. The company also owns out-of-home advertising business under its advertising arms, which consists of Big Tree, The Right Channel, Kurnia Outdoor, Gotcha, UPD, and Big Tree Seni Jaya, as well as an art gallery, Galeri Prima (formerly NSTP Art Gallery).

The company's former assets including book and magazine publishing company, Berita Publishing (which was part of the NSTP until 2000 when it was sold to Alaf Positif), education arm Malaysia Institute of Integrative Media (MIIM; formerly Akademi TV3; sold to SAL Group of Colleges in 2003), English newspaper the Malay Mail (which was sold to Redberry Media Group in 2012), pay-television service Mega TV and Ghanaian free-to-air TV network, TV3 Ghana, which all of these were operated long before Media Prima was established.

== Leadership ==
=== Board of directors ===
- Group Chairman
  - Datuk Seri (Dr.) Syed Hussain Aljunid
- Group Managing Director
  - Rafiq Razali
- Independent Non-Executive Director
  - Abdullah Abu Samah
  - Dato' Sivananthan Shanmugam
  - Datuk Phang Ah Tong
  - Datuk Shireen Ann Zaharah Muhiudeen

=== Senior management team ===
- Group Managing Director
  - Rafiq Razali
- Group Chief Financial Officer
  - Rosli Sabarudin
- Chief Executive Officer (Media Prima Television Networks & Primeworks Studios)
  - Nini Yusof
- Chief Executive Officer (REV Media Group)
  - Samuel Wee
- Chief Executive Officer (Media Prima Audio)
  - Nazri Noran
- Chief Operating Officer (Big Tree and Media Prima OMNiA, Agency Solutions)
  - Stephanie Wong Pui Tse
- Chief Operating Officer (Media Prima OMNiA, Direct Solutions)
  - Datuk Mohd Efendi Bin Omar
- Group Chief Marketing Officer MPB, Chief Operating Officer, TV3 & Tonton MPTN
  - Amir Rasyidi Bin Johari
- Group Managing Editor, Media Prima News & Current Affairs Division
  - Jasbant Singh

== Incidents ==
=== 2018 bomb threat ===
On 28 August 2018, Media Prima's Sri Pentas headquarters was forced to evacuate following a false bomb threat. The police gave an order to evacuate the company's office at 10.30 pm. About 200 Media Prima employees were evacuated from the building. They were allowed to re-enter the building after two hours of inspection. The police did not find anything suspicious.

Following the cancellation of Nightline, TV3 aired the announcement about the incident. The Royal Malaysia Police's bomb detector unit arrived at 11.40 pm to handle the case. The Fire and Rescue Department received the phone call from the police at 11.19 pm following the incident. The case was investigated under Section 506 of the Penal Code, and the police found it was a false bomb threat. Two men were arrested in Temerloh, Pahang on 29 August 2018.

=== Ransomware attack ===
On 8 November 2018, Media Prima's computer system was locked and hacked by cyber criminals who demanded millions of ringgit for ransom. The attackers are said to be demanding 1,000 bitcoins to give up access to the computer system. It is not immediately known whether the company's data has been breached, and whether the media group will suffer financial losses as a result of the ransomware attack. Media Prima has decided not to pay the ransom.

== Awards and accolades ==
| Year | Award-giving body | Category | Result | Ref. |
|---|---|---|---|---|
| 2016 | Minister of Human Resources Awards | —N/a | Won | |
| 2017 | Marketing Excellence Awards | —N/a | Won | |
| 2018 | The Spark Awards | Media Company of the Year | Won | |
| 2018 | The Spark Awards | Media Brand of the Year | Won | |
| 2018 | Marketing Council Awards | —N/a | Won | |
| 2018 | Australasian Reporting Awards | Golden Award | Gold | |
| 2019 | Malaysian Digital Association Awards | Digital Publisher of the Year | Won | |
| 2020 | Australasian Reporting Awards | —N/a | Gold | |
| 2021 | MSWG-ASEAN Corporate Governance Awards | Industrial Excellence Award for Corporate Governance Exposure | Won | |
| 2022 | The Edge ESG Awards | Silver Award for Telecommunications and Media Company | Silver | |
| 2022 | Huawei Developers' Day 2022 | Best Digital Media | Won | |
| 2023 | Sustainability and CSR Malaysia Awards | Company of the Year | Won | |
| 2023 | Kinabalu Press Awards | —N/a | Won | |
| 2023 | Kelantan Press Awards | —N/a | Won | |
| 2023 | MACC Media Awards | —N/a | Won | |

== See also ==
- Mass media in Malaysia
- Television in Malaysia
- Radio Televisyen Malaysia (RTM)
- Astro
- Singapore Press Holdings
  - SPH Media
