= TEA FM =

- Kuching; Malaysia
- Broadcast area: East Malaysia (Sarawak)

Programming
- Languages: Mandarin; English
- Format: Talk; Contemporary hit (CHR)

Ownership
- Owner: Tea FM Radio Sdn Bhd

History
- First air date: 1 August 2015; 11 years ago (Sarawak); 8 August 2015; 11 years ago (Sabah)
- Last air date: January 2026; 10 months ago (Sabah)

Links
- Website: teafm.com.my

TEA FM is an East Malaysian Chinese and English language radio station. TEA FM is Sarawak's first Mandarin Chinese and English local private radio station.

The content is described by the owners as 55% Chinese and 45% English, focusing on listeners in the 20–45 age group.

== History ==
TEA FM is jointly set up by KTS Group and Ancom Berhad subsidiary, Redberry Media Sdn Bhd and broadcasts in Mandarin Chinese and English. It first broadcast its service in Kuching on 1 August 2015 and Kota Kinabalu on 8 August 2015. The station was officially launched on 28 November 2015 by the Chief Minister of Sarawak, Adenan Satem.

The station broadcasts from Crown Towers at Jalan Padungan, Kuching.

Starting from January 2026, TEA FM were discontinued in Kota Kinabalu, due to declining of radio audiences in Sabah and silent signal.

== Frequency ==
Frequencies	Broadcast area	Transmission site
100.7 MHz	Sibu, Sarawak	Bukit Lima
102.7 MHz	Kuching, Sarawak	Bukit Antu
