= Kool FM (Malaysia) =

Radio station in Bangsar

- Kuala Lumpur; Malaysia
- Broadcast area: Klang Valley, Penang, Alor Setar, Kuching, Ipoh, Malacca and Johor Bahru
- Frequencies: See list
- RDS: KOOL FM

Programming
- Language: Malay
- Format: Adult contemporary, classic hits
- Affiliations: Media Prima Audio

Ownership
- Owner: Media Prima Berhad; (Kool FM Radio Sdn Bhd)
- Sister stations: List: Hot FM; Fly FM; Eight FM; Molek FM

History
- First air date: 3 March 2016; 10 years ago
- Former names: Buletin FM (2021–2023); Kool 101 (2023–2025)

Links
- Webcast: dengar.koolfm.audio
- Website: www.koolfm.audio

Kool FM (briefly known as Buletin FM and KOOL 101) is a Malaysian private radio station owned by Media Prima Berhad through its radio subsidiary, Media Prima Audio, which broadcasts in the Malay language. It was launched on 1 March 2016. It is the fourth radio station from Media Prima Audio after Eight FM, Fly FM, Hot FM and before Molek FM. The radio station is based on the acquisition of Laureate Sdn. Bhd. in October 2015, which owns Ultra FM and Pi Mai FM.

== History ==
=== 2016–2021: First Kool FM era and shift to talk radio ===
Originally, Kool FM targeted listeners from the country's Generation X, with songs being played mostly from the 1980s and 1990s, but it also included some songs from the 2000s and 2010s. The name was based on the band Kool and the Gang.

On 3 January 2020, Kool FM rebranded with a new logo. It changed its radio format into talk radio from 6 January with the tagline Suara Semasa, focusing on current affairs, social and community, and various talk and infotainment programmes. The announcers as well as the music playing on the station (80s, 90s and current songs) would remain.

Beginning 4 May 2021, the station broadcast simultaneously on TV9, every day from 3:30 - 4:30 am.

=== 2021–2023: Rebrand as Buletin FM ===
On 2 August 2021, Kool FM was rebranded as Buletin FM, a news station with Ally and Hawa (from Malaysia Hari Ini and Buletin Utama TV3 respectively) as the new announcers, to compete with Bernama Radio. The live audio simulcast of Buletin Utama from TV3 began on air from 2 August 2021 to 31 May 2022 every weekday.

On 29 November 2021, Buletin FM broadcasts in Kuala Terengganu, Terengganu and Kota Bharu, Kelantan were discontinued. It was replaced by Molek FM on 9 January 2022.

On 14 March 2022, Buletin FM changed its tagline again from "Info Terkini & Muzik Sepanjang Zaman" to "Isu Semasa dan Info Terkini".

From 28 March 2022, Buletin FM no longer broadcast temporarily through the MYTV platform.

=== 2023−2025: Rebrand as Kool 101 ===
According to the GfK Radio Audience Measurement Wave 1 2023, Buletin FM recorded 133,000 weekly listeners, the lowest number of weekly listeners recorded on any Media Prima owned stations (compared to the previous Kool FM branding which recorded 701,000 weekly listeners in late 2020). Because such a large number of weekly listeners were lost and its previous role as an all-news radio didn't work well, Buletin FM ceased using the brand on 17 June 2023.

The station was later rebranded as Kool 101 on 3 July 2023. The name "Kool 101" was chosen as it is more relevant to the current situation where most listeners are familiar with the original Kool FM name. The number "101" on the station name refers to giving basic knowledge of the topic, as well as being the frequency used for the Klang Valley, dating back to the early broadcast as Ultra FM. The music playlist has changed to play more Malaysian adult contemporary based music from the 90s to now. Indonesian and English songs were occasionally played with Malay rock jiwang music rarely featured on Kool 101. Kool 101 was the first Media Prima radio station to remove the "FM" suffix from its brand name.

In December 2023, TV9 temporarily stopped simulcasting Kool 101 due to low listenership. It was replaced by Hot FM simulcast from Tuesday - Saturday 3:30am – 4:30 am and Monday 3:40am – 4:40am but brought back the simulcast on the same TV channel in January 2024 using the same timetable.

Kool 101 began broadcasting from its new studios in Balai Berita, Bangsar on 6 January 2025.

=== 2025–present: Second Kool FM era ===
On 3 November 2025, the station was re-launched and readopted the Kool FM name with the introduction of frequencies in Ipoh, Malacca and Johor Bahru, where it was originally broadcast as Eight FM.

== Notable announcers ==
=== Current ===
- Aznil Nawawi
- Haiza
- Muaz Mohamed
- Jamal Jamaluddin

== Frequencies ==
Frequency	Area	Transmitter	Note
101.3 MHz	Klang Valley	Bukit Sungai Besi	This frequency was formerly used by Ultra FM
90.2 MHz	Penang and Taiping, Perak	Bukit Penara	This frequency was formerly used by Pi Mai FM
107.3 MHz	Perlis and Alor Setar, Kedah	Alor Setar Tower	Starting 6 October 2016
104.3 MHz	Kuching, Sarawak	Bukit Djin	Starting 29 November 2017
87.6 MHz	Ipoh, Perak	Gunung Kledang	Starting 3 November 2025; This frequency was formerly used by Eight FM
88.1 MHz	Malacca dan Northern Johor	Mount Ledang	Starting 3 November 2025; This frequency was formerly used by Eight FM
105.3 MHz	Johor Bahru, Johor	Taman Sentosa	Starting 3 November 2025; This frequency was formerly used by Eight FM

== Similar radios ==
- Sonora FM in Indonesia
