= Tonton (streaming service) =

Malaysian over-the-top streaming service

tonton
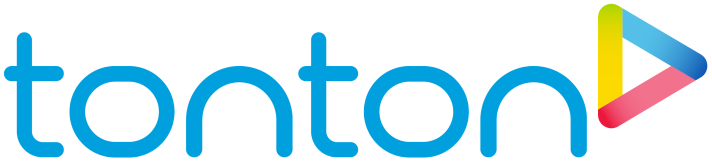
- Logo used since 2022

- Tonton's website in August 2023
- Former names: Catch-Up TV and gua.com.my (2007–2010)
- Website type: OTT platform PPV
- Available in: Malay and English
- Headquarters: Balai Berita, Bangsar, Kuala Lumpur, {{{location_country}}}
- Area served: Nationwide
- Owner: Media Prima
- Creator: REV Media Group
- Products: xtra; Tonton Cinema
- Website: www.tonton.com.my
- Commercial: Yes
- Registration: Optional; subscription required if needed for no advertisements
- Launched: September 6, 2007; 19 years ago
- Current status: Active

Tonton (stylized in lowercase), formerly known as Catch-Up TV and briefly as gua.com.my, is a Malaysian over-the-top media service owned and operated by REV Media Group, a wholly-owned subsidiary of Media Prima. The service traces its roots to the launch of Catch-Up TV in 6 September 2007, one of the first Internet television and video on demand platforms to be set up in Malaysia. The service's website contains all Media Prima television channels and radio stations, as well as having two separate websites xtra and tonton Cinema.

== History ==
=== Origins ===
==== Catch-Up TV ====
Catch-Up TV was launched on 6 September 2007 as one of the first Malaysia-owned over-the-top and video on demand platforms, which offers content from the company's television channels and their respective websites. Upon its launch, the platform has reached over 67.1 million subscribers nationwide as of January 2008.

==== gua.com.my and guamuzik.com.my ====
On 11 September 2007, Media Prima launched an Internet portal, gua.com.my and its music portal, guamuzik.com.my, which provides latest entertainment and lifestyle news from Malaysia and abroad. It achieved 1 million views in the first month after its launch. Gua.com.my also earned recognition in The Malaysia Book of Records for being the first online drama series in Malaysia via Kerana Karina, produced in association with Grand Brilliance, a television and film production arm of Media Prima.

On 14 April 2008, Alt Media launched guamuzik.com.my, a website that devoted specially for music. It offers the sale of various music genres by local and international artists and also displays music charts from Media Prima's radio and entertainment programs.

=== Rebranding to Tonton ===
On 1 August 2010, Catch-Up TV was rebranded as Tonton. The new portal combined television services from various previous television portals. Tonton enables Media Prima to deliver content and user interaction to the market. Alt Media spent approximately RM10 million to develop the platform and targeted to achieve 2 million subscribers by the end of 2010.

In November 2012, tonton began offers live streaming of all four Media Prima channels, including the latter's flagship TV3 and TV9 (unrelated to the ABS-CBN's former channel number frequencies in Manila that has been used until 1969) on multiple devices.

The platform began made available on Samsung Smart TV in May 2013, following a partnership signed between Alt Media and Samsung Electronics in September 2012.

In 2013 and 2014, Alt Media had three media portals, namely the video portal, Tonton; the entertainment and lifestyle portal, gua.com.my; and the women's portal, Seroja. All of these portals were closed in 2015, except for Tonton.

In May 2014, tonton launches its music streaming service, Tonton Music in a collaboration between the Media Prima subsidiairies.

On 20 April 2016, Tonton was relaunched and updated with content as a streaming service and application that offers free and exclusive content to subscribers. The platform also introduces a VIP package that allows registered users and new customers to enjoy benefits including viewing programs exclusively in advance before its TV premiere.

On 27 April 2017, Media Prima and Singaporean telecommunications company, Singtel signed a strategic partnership to expand tonton for viewers in Singapore, which marks the service's first foreign venture. Tonton become available in Singapore on 1 June.

Tonton become available in Brunei on 14 August 2017 following a partnership signed between Media Prima and Bruneian technology company, Datastream Technology.

In October 2017, Tonton began offers a lifestyle channel Outdoor Channel Asia, which features exclusive leisure, adventure and endurance action contents.

In October 2024, Tonton launched an Asian horror-themed movie channel Thrill, first horror movie channel debuted in Malaysia.

== See also ==
- Media Prima
- RTMKlik
- Astro Go
- List of streaming media services
