= Hot FM (Malaysia) =

Radio station in Bangsar

- Kuala Lumpur; Malaysia
- Broadcast area: Malaysia; Singapore (Hot FM Johor only); Indonesia (Hot FM Johor only)
- Frequency: Varies depending on its region
- RDS: HOT FM

Programming
- Language: Malay
- Format: Top 40 (CHR) (6 February 2006-31 May 2022); Hot adult contemporary (1 June 2022-present)
- Affiliations: Media Prima Audio

Ownership
- Owner: Media Prima Berhad; (Synchrosound Studios Sdn Bhd)
- Sister stations: List: Eight FM; Kool FM; Fly FM; Molek FM

History
- First air date: 6 February 2006; 20 years ago

Links
- Webcast: Audio+ TuneIn (Peninsular Malaysia only)
- Website: www.hotfm.audio

Hot FM, stylised as hot fm, is a Malaysian radio station owned by Media Prima Audio, a radio broadcasting subsidiary of Malaysian media conglomerate, Media Prima. The station broadcasts are transmitted from Balai Berita in Bangsar. The station operates 24 hours a day; broadcasting a mixed selection of songs in Malay, Indonesian, and English; though Malay is the major language used.

In addition to the radio broadcasting, Hot FM simulcasts the programming on television, the first one on 8TV from 2006 until 2016 where it broadcast HOT FM AM Krew and featured an interactive SMS chatbox during the program. Hot FM started broadcasting simultaneously on May 4, 2021, Hot FM broadcast simultaneously on TV3 every Tuesday to Saturday from 1:30 am – 2:30 am until 1 September 2022. Hot FM broadcasts simultaneously on NTV7 every day from 12:00 midnight - 7:00 am starting April 4, 2022, TV9 every Tuesday - Sunday 3:30 am - 4:30 am, and every Monday 3:40 am - 4:40 am started in December 2023 replacing Kool 101.

== History ==
Hot FM previously operated as wow.fm, then WaFM, which was owned by Tiara Jacquelina. Media Prima acquired the station after the station began test transmissions from 15 January 2006 to 6 February 2006, in which the station officially commenced operations led by Seelan Paul, who was a former presenter with Era FM.

In 2009, Hot FM went down in history as for the first time the station was charted at the top among other radio stations in Malaysia with 3.8 million weekly listeners, ahead of its traditional rival Era FM which only reached 3.76 million listeners in a week.

On 29 November 2021, the frequency of Hot FM in Kota Bharu, Kelantan transmitted from Peringat has been changed from 105.1 MHz to 88.6 MHz and replace Buletin FM which has ended its broadcast.

On March 28, 2022 to September 22, 2023, Hot FM broadcast temporarily through the MYTV platform.

On June 1, 2022, Hot FM began playing Malay songs from the 90s every hour, effectively changed the radio format to hot adult contemporary radio station.

On 2 July 2023, Hot FM claimed as the "number 1 radio station in Malaysia" with 3.8 million weekly listeners according to Nielsen’s Consumer and Media View (July 2022-June 2023). While according to GfK RAM Survey Wave 2 in 2023, Hot FM were placed as the 3rd most listened Malay-language radio station in Malaysia.

Hot FM officially moved to Balai Berita, Bangsar on 23 December 2024 with new equipment, following Media Prima's television news divisions move to the building earlier in October.

== Notable announcers ==
- Khairy Jamaluddin (from 15 February 2023)
- AG Azmeer (returned as of July 2021; previously as a Hot FM presenter from 2006 to 2016 and Kool FM presenter from 2016 to 2021)
- Fara Fauzana (returned as of July 2021)
- Johan (joined Hot FM as of August 2022, previously as an Era FM presenter from 2011 to 2022)
- Masyuni Abdullah (joined Hot FM as of January 2022, also as the champion of Hot FM Radio Star)
- Fizi Ali (joined Hot FM as of August 2022, previously as an Ultra FM presenter from 2015 to 2016 and Suria FM presenter from 2016 to July 2022)
- Aisha Mazlin (joined from Contest Fizi Cari jodoh 2023)

== Frequency ==
Frequencies	Area	Transmitter
97.6 MHz	Klang Valley	Mount Ulu Kali
88.2 MHz	Perlis, Alor Setar, Kedah and Penang	Upper Mount Jerai
90.5 MHz	Taiping, Perak	Bukit Larut
104.5 MHz	Ipoh, Perak	Gunung Kledang
99.5 MHz	Seremban, Negeri Sembilan	Mount Telapak Buruk
104.3 MHz	Malacca	Mount Ledang
90.1 MHz	Johor Bahru, Johor and Singapore	Mount Pulai
92.4 MHz	Kuantan, Pahang	Bukit Pelindung
105.0 MHz	Kuala Terengganu, Terengganu	Bukit Besar
88.6 MHz	Kota Bharu, Kelantan	Peringat
94.3 MHz	Kuching, Sarawak	Gunung Serapi
87.7 MHz	Kota Kinabalu, Sabah	Bukit Karatong
