= Media Prima Audio =

Malaysian radio broadcasting group

- Logo used since 1 August 2025
- Formerly: Media Prima Radio Networks (2005–2018); Ripple Media (2018–2021)
- Type: Subsidiary
- Industry: Radio network; Broadcasting
- Founded: 3 October 2005; 20 years ago
- Headquarters: Balai Berita, Bangsar, Kuala Lumpur, Malaysia
- Area served: Nationwide
- Key people: Nazri Noran (CEO)
- Parent: Media Prima
- Website: www.mediaprima.audio

Media Prima Audio is a Malaysian radio network company which operates radio broadcasting services. Established in 2005, it is a wholly owned subsidiary of Media Prima Berhad. Media Prima Audio owns and manages 5 private radio stations which are transmitted through the FM (frequency modulation) radio spectrum.

As of November 2021, based on the October 2021 Gfk Radio Survey, Media Prima Audio is the most popular radio network in Malaysia with over 5 million listeners and 57 million digital listeners since its rival, Astro Audio. As of April 2024, it became the most popular radio network in Malaysia with over 5.6 million listeners, according to a survey by the Nielsen and Consumer & Media View between January to December 2023.

== History ==
Media Prima Audio logo, used from 2 August 2021 to 31 July 2025.

Media Prima Audio began in 2005 as the Media Prima Radio Networks following the establishment of its first radio station, Fly FM.

It operates five commercial radio stations – Eight FM (formerly known as Wanita FM, One FM and 8FM), Kool FM (briefly known as Buletin FM and Kool 101), Fly FM, Hot FM (formerly known as WOW.fm and WaFM), Molek FM and a podcast – Audio+ (formerly known as Ais Kacang). Unlike Astro Radio and Radio Televisyen Malaysia (RTM) which have Tamil-language radio stations, Media Prima Audio does not have a Tamil-language radio station.

Media Prima Radio Networks was rebranded as Ripple Media in October 2018, combining digital media, broadcasting and commerce. At the same time, it launches seven new digital assets - Dhia, Donna, Lunaria, The Laki, Likely, Chapters and Wakeke.

On 2 August 2021, Ripple Media underwent rebranding exercise and changed its name to Media Prima Audio.

== Stations ==
Name	Operator	Language(s)	Notes
Fly FM	Max-Airplay Sdn. Bhd.	English	Launched on 3 October 2005
Hot FM	Synchrosound Studio Sdn. Bhd. (formerly known as Tabah Cergas)	Malay	Launched on 6 February 2006
Eight FM	One FM Radio Sdn. Bhd. (formerly known as Radio Wanita)	Chinese (Mandarin and Cantonese)	Launched on 19 January 2009 (as One FM); 2 August 2021 (as 8FM); 1 August 2023 (as Eight FM)
Kool FM	Kool FM Radio Sdn. Bhd. (formerly known as Copyright Laureate)	Malay	Launched on 3 March 2016 (as Kool FM); 2 August 2021 (as Buletin FM); 3 July 2023 (as Kool 101); 3 November 2025 (reverted into Kool FM)
Molek FM	Kool FM Radio Sdn. Bhd. (formerly known as Copyright Laureate)	Malay	Launched on 9 January 2022

== See also ==
- List of radio stations in Malaysia
- List of assets owned by Media Prima
- Astro Audio
