= Asia Honour Paper Industries =

Malaysian pulp and paper company

Asia Honour Paper Industries (M) Sdn. Bhd
- Formerly: Malaysian Newsprint Industries
- Company type: Private Limited Company
- Industry: Pulp and paper
- Founded: 1996; 30 years ago
- Headquarters: Level 12, Wisma Averis (Tower 2) Avenue 5 Bangsar South City, No 8 Jalan Kerinchi, 59200 Kuala Lumpur, Malaysia
- Area served: Malaysia; Indonesia; China; India
- Products: Newsprint
- Owner: Asia Honour (Hong Kong) Limited
- Number of employees: >200
- Website: asiahonourpaper.com

Asia Honour Paper Industries (M) Sdn. Bhd., formerly known as Malaysian Newsprint Industries Sdn. Bhd. (abbreviated MNI), is a pulp and paper company based in Malaysia. It operates a single pulp mill and paper mill in Mentakab, Pahang, which produces an annual 280,000 tonnes of newsprint sourced entirely from deinked pulp from recycled paper. In 2017, MNI was the largest supplier for Media Chinese International Ltd, which owns local mandarin newspapers such as Sin Chew Daily and Nanyang Siang Pau.

== History ==
The company was established in 1996, in an attempt to allow Malaysian and Singaporean newspaper to source their newsprint without having to import. The company was established as a joint venture between the New Zealand newsprint manufacturer Fletcher Challenge Paper, the Malaysian family conglomerate the Hong Leong Group, each with 33.65 percent of the shares, with the remainder split between the New Straits Times Press and Rimbunan Hijau. The mill opened in April 1999, having cost 500 million United States dollars. Fletcher Challenge Paper was bought by Norske Skog in 2000, who took over the ownership stake in MNI.

MNI's logo prior to the rebranding

=== Losses and subsequent sold off ===
On 2 May 2018, citing the declining newsprint demand, MNI's then owner Hong Leong Industry Berhad and the New Straits Times sold off their respective shares for RM22.3 million and RM14.15 million respectively to Asia Honour (Hong Kong) Limited. By then, the company had been making losses for three consecutive years. Subsequently, on 17 February 2020, Malaysian Newsprint Industries Sdn Bhd officially renamed and rebranded to Asia Honour Paper Industries (M) Sdn. Bhd. to reflect its new owner.
