= Fly FM =

- Kuala Lumpur; Malaysia
- Broadcast area: Malaysia (Peninsular Malaysia); Indonesia (Batam and Bintan Islands, Fly FM Johor only); Singapore (Fly FM Johor only); Thailand (Southern Thailand, Fly FM Kedah and Kota Bharu only)
- Frequency: Varies depending on its region
- RDS: FLY FM

Programming
- Language: English
- Format: Contemporary hit radio (3 October 2005–1 August 2021; 2022-present); Hot adult contemporary (2 August 2021-2022)

Ownership
- Owner: Media Prima Berhad; (Max-Airplay Sdn Bhd)
- Sister stations: List: Eight FM; Kool FM; Hot FM; Molek FM

History
- First air date: 3 October 2005; 21 years ago

Links
- Webcast: listen.flyfm.audio
- Website: www.flyfm.audio

Fly FM is an English-language Malaysian private radio station owned by Media Prima Audio, a radio broadcasting subsidiary of Malaysian media conglomerate Media Prima. It was launched on 3 October 2005 and targets listeners aged between fifteen and thirty years old.

Fly FM is the second-most popular English radio station in Malaysia and the fastest growing radio station in the country. Music aired on Fly FM consists of both English and Malay songs.

== History ==
In 2003, Media Prima announced that it had applied for a license to operate a radio station as part of the company's expansion of business operations. Later, on 29 April 2005, Media Prima acquired Perintis Layar, which owns 75% of Max Airplay. This acquisition included the rights to manage, operate, and maintain a radio station.

Fly FM began operations on 3 October 2005; its official launch happened on 9 October 2005, making it the first radio station under Media Prima Radio Networks (later Ripple Media; now Media Prima Audio). Originally, it was broadcast live from Kuala Lumpur International Airport (KLIA) and was thus the first radio station in the world to be based in an airport.

By June 2006, Fly FM and its sister station Hot FM had a listenership total of 3.4 million according to a survey by Nielsen Media Research. In 2007, Fly FM introduced a programme slot called 50 Minutes of Non-Stop Music where songs aired for 50 minutes without commercials.

From 2 August 2021, Fly FM was temporarily rebranded into a hot adult contemporary radio station as part of Media Prima's radio rebranding exercise at the same time. Its URL address, www.flyfm.com.my, was renamed www.flyfm.audio.

Between 28 March 2022 and 22 September 2023, Fly FM was temporarily not broadcast through the MYTV platform.

=== Hosts ===
The station was initially launched by Jason Cottam and the DJ Fly Guy (Saufian Mokhtar). Together with Yvonne Natalie Kniese (Natalie), they hosted the morning show The Pagi Show. Natalie was later replaced by Phat Fabes, and Fly Guy was replaced by Ben (Loh Ben Jern). Soon after, Nadia was added as the show's third host. From 26 June 2011 onwards, Phat Fabes and Ben were moved to the evening slot, and the morning show was renamed The Pagi Rock Crew (named after LMFAO's hit song "Party Rock Anthem"). It was presented by Hafiz and Prem along with the original morning crew and Nadia. Nadia left the station on 20 March 2012.

In 2013, Zher and Guibo were brought on, and the show renamed as the All New Pagi Rock Crew. After a year, they were moved to the evening slot. The current morning show is Ben & Hafiz, while the night show Fly 30 is managed by Ivan.

In 2015, Ben's retirement led to the formation of a new morning slot called the #FlyWolfPack consisting of Hafiz, Dennis and Guibo. In 2017, after Dennis left, the morning show was renamed Fly FM's Hafiz and Guibo. In August 2017, Zher left the radio.

On 30 July 2021, Douglas Lim joined Ili for Fly FM's Breakfast Show.

== Segments ==
=== Weekdays(Monday to Friday) ===
Week	Segment	Time	Host
Monday to Friday	Fly FM Wonda Breakfast with Ean, Adam & Rika	6a.m. to 10a.m.	Ean, Adam & Rika
Monday to Friday	Non-Stop Music	10a.m. to 4p.m.	-
Monday to Friday	The Ryan Show	4p.m. to 8p.m.	Ryan
Friday	Fly Nite Club	8p.m. to 2a.m.	Jakeman & Skeletor

=== Weekend(Saturday and Sunday) ===
Week	Segment	Time	Host
Saturday and Sunday	Fly Weekends	12p.m. to 4p.m.	Bubba D & Sham
Saturday and Sunday	Fly Nite Club	9p.m. to 2a.m.	Jakeman & Skeletor

=== Saturday ===
Week	Segment	Time	Host
Saturday	The Fly Top 40	9a.m. to 12p.m.	Ryan

=== Sunday ===
Week	Segment	Time	Host
Sunday	The Fly Top 40(Encore)	4p.m. to 7p.m.	Ryan

== Host ==
=== Full-time Host ===
- Ean
- Adam
- Rika
- Ryan

=== Part-time Host ===
- Bubba D
- Sham
- Jakeman
- Skeletor

== Frequency ==
Frequencies	Area	Transmitter
95.8 MHz	Klang Valley	Mount Ulu Kali
99.1 MHz	Perlis and Alor Setar, Kedah	Alor Setar Tower
89.9 MHz	Penang and Taiping, Perak	Bukit Penara
87.9 MHz	Ipoh, Perak	Gunung Kledang
98.6 MHz	Seremban, Negeri Sembilan	Mount Telapak Buruk
94.0 MHz	Malacca	Mount Ledang
102.5 MHz	Johor Bahru, Johor and Singapore	Mount Pulai
87.6 MHz	Kuantan, Pahang	Bukit Pelindung
107.5 MHz	Kuala Terengganu, Terengganu	Bukit Jerung
107.4 MHz	Kota Bharu, Kelantan	Peringat

== Similar radios ==
- Hard Rock FM in Indonesia
