= Molek FM =

Radio station in East Coast, Malaysia

- Kuala Lumpur; Malaysia
- Broadcast area: Kelantan, Terengganu and Pahang
- RDS: MOLEK FM

Programming
- Language: Malay
- Affiliations: Media Prima Audio

Ownership
- Owner: Media Prima Berhad; (Kool FM Radio Sdn Bhd)
- Sister stations: List: Eight FM; Kool FM; Fly FM; Hot FM

History
- First air date: 9 January 2022

Links
- Webcast: dengar.molekfm.audio
- Website: www.molekfm.audio

Molek FM, stylized as molek fm is a Malaysian private radio station operated by Media Prima Audio, a radio subsidiary of Media Prima Berhad, serving the East Coast areas of Peninsular Malaysia. The Station operates 24 hours daily from the Company's Balai Berita headquarters in Bangsar, Kuala Lumpur. The Station is targeted to listeners aged 18 to 39, as well as East Coast peninsular listeners aged 24 to 34.

== History ==
Prior to the Station's launch, the East Coast peninsular region only had two Malay radio networks for the specific audience: Manis FM and THR Gegar owned by Astro Radio.

Molek FM began test transmission on 2 January 2022 and began official broadcasts a week later, on 9 January. Molek FM plays songs from the 80s and 90s, as well as Malay, Hindi, Indonesian, English and Thai hits that serve the East Coast peninsular audience.

On 31 May 2022, Molek FM was awarded the "Excellence In Media Communication" trophy for the radio category through the Kelantan Entrepreneurship Business Awards 2022 which took place in Kota Bharu, Kelantan.

On 2 October 2022, Molek FM began broadcasting in Kuantan, Pahang through the frequency of 100.4 MHz which transmitted from Bukit Pelindung to replace the Chinese language radio station slot under Media Prima Audio which is 8FM (formerly One FM).

== Notable announcers ==
- DJ Nazz
- Qila Shahirah
- Mat Dan
- Anna Aljuffrey

== Frequency ==
Frequencies	Area	Transmitter	Note
105.1 MHz	Kota Bharu, Kelantan	Peringat	This frequency was previously used by Hot FM.
93.6 MHz	Kuala Terengganu, Terengganu	Bukit Besar	This frequency was previously used by Buletin FM.
100.4 MHz	Kuantan, Pahang	Bukit Pelindung	This frequency was previously used by 8FM.

== See also ==
- Manis FM owned by Husa Network, established in 1998.
- THR Gegar (formerly Gegar) owned by Astro Radio, established in 2005 through the acquisition of Time Highway Radio (THR).
