= Eight FM =

Malaysian Chinese-language radio station

Eight WuXian Eight无限
- Kuala Lumpur; Malaysia
- Broadcast area: Klang Valley, Alor Setar, Penang, Seremban, Kuching and Kota Kinabalu
- Frequency: See list
- RDS: EIGHT WUXIAN

Programming
- Language: Mandarin
- Format: Contemporary hit radio
- Affiliations: Media Prima Audio

Ownership
- Owner: Media Prima Berhad; (One FM Radio Sdn Bhd)
- Sister stations: List: Kool FM; Fly FM; Hot FM; Molek FM

History
- First air date: 19 January 2009
- Former names: One FM (2009–2021); 8FM (2021–2023); Eight FM (2023-2025)

Links
- Webcast: listen.eight.audio
- Website: www.eight.audio

Eight WuXian (Chinese: Eight无限) (formerly Wanita FM, One FM, 8FM and Eight FM) is a Malaysian Mandarin-language radio station and owned by Media Prima Audio, a radio broadcasting subsidiary of the Malaysian media conglomerate, Media Prima.

== History ==
Eight FM began broadcasting in 2006 as a women's radio station called "Wanita FM", which was acquired by Media Prima in 2009. The station was eventually renamed to One FM and change its broadcasting format into Chinese-language radio station.

Beginning 4 May 2021, the Radio Station was simulcast on 8TV daily from 1:30 am to 7:00 am.

Old logo used from 2021 to 2023.

On 2 August 2021, One FM was formally reorganised into 8FM which based on the 8TV branding. On the evening of the same day, 8TV Mandarin News broadcast simultaneously by 8TV and 8FM. Media Prima had fully realized cross-platform resource interoperability and the 8FM logo. Malaysian television stations used the 8TV logo until August 31, 2023.

On 28 March 2022 to 22 September 2023, 8FM temporarily broadcast through the MYTV platform.

On 25 September 2022, 8FM ceased broadcasting in Kuantan, Pahang 100.4MHz due to low rating in Kuantan and was replaced by Molek FM on 2 October 2022. Listeners used 8FM via Audio+ app, 8FM YouTube LIVE streaming, 8FM web streaming or FM 88.1MHz from Gunung Ulu Kali. 8FM Kuantan frequency 100.4MHz was replaced by Molek FM; 8FM could be tuned on 88.1MHz in parts of Kuantan with weaker signal.

Old logo used from 2023 to 2025.

On 1 August 2023, 8FM renamed to Eight FM and changed to a fully Mandarin-language radio station starting 2024.

Eight FM began broadcasting from its new studios in Balai Berita, Bangsar on 13 January 2025.

On 27 October 2025, Eight FM was discontinued in Johor Bahru, Johor; Malacca and Ipoh, Perak due to a decline in listenership and was replaced by Kool FM on 3 November 2025.

== Frequencies ==
Frequencies	Area	Transmitter
88.1 MHz	Klang Valley, South Perak and West Pahang	Gunung Ulu Kali
87.8 MHz	Perlis, Alor Setar, Kedah and Penang	Mount Jerai
87.8 MHz	Taiping, Perak	Mount Jerai
88.3 MHz	Seremban, Negeri Sembilan	Bukit Gun
98.3 MHz	Kuching, Sarawak	Bukit Djin
95.7 MHz	Kota Kinabalu, Sabah	Bukit Karatong

== See also ==
- List of radio stations in Malaysia
