= List of radio stations in Malaysia =

This is a list of radio stations in Malaysia, ordered by location and frequency. Frequency varies in different states.

There are a total of 24 private and 44 government-owned radio stations in Malaysia. Stations owned by the government operate under the Radio Televisyen Malaysia (RTM) group. Other stations such as BBC World Service, China Radio International and Voice of Vietnam are available in Malaysia via AM.

== Stations ==
=== FM stations ===
Frequency (Note: All the frequencies below can be heard in the Klang Valley area.)	RDS	Station	Operator	Language	Genre	Coverage Area
87.7 MHz (Kuala Lumpur); 98.3 MHz (Selangor)	YES	Radio Klasik	RTM	Malay	Oldies	Nationwide
88.1 MHz	YES	Eight WuXian	Media Prima Audio	Mandarin	CHR (C-pop/Cantopop)	Klang Valley, Alor Setar, Penang, Seremban, Kuching & Kota Kinabalu
88.5 MHz (Kuala Lumpur); 95.3 MHz (Selangor)	YES	Nasional FM	RTM	Malay	Adult contemporary News/Talk	Nationwide
88.9 MHz	YES	goXuan	Astro Audio	Mandarin	Infotainment; CHR (C-pop/K-pop)	Nationwide
89.3 MHz (Kuala Lumpur); 106.7 MHz (Selangor)	YES	Ai FM	RTM	Mandarin; Cantonese; Teochew; Hokkien; Hakka	Adult contemporary (C-pop); News/Talk	Nationwide
89.9 MHz	YES	BFM 89.9	BFM Media	English; Malay	Financial news and talk	Kuala Lumpur, Selangor, Parts of Negeri Sembilan & Malacca, Southern Perak, West Pahang
90.3 MHz (Kuala Lumpur); 100.1 MHz (Selangor)	YES	TraXX FM	RTM	English	Adult contemporary News/Talk	Nationwide
91.1 MHz (Kuala Lumpur); 102.5 MHz (Selangor)	YES	Asyik FM; Salam FM	RTM; Department of Islamic Development Malaysia (JAKIM; Salam FM)	Aslian languages (Jakun, Semai, Temiar, Temuan; Asyik FM); Malay	Adult contemporary News/Talk; Religious broadcasting (Salam FM)	Kuala Lumpur, Selangor, Southern Perak, Lenggong, West Pahang, Part of Negeri Sembilan
91.5 MHz	YES	IKIMfm	Institute of Islamic Understanding Malaysia (IKIM)	Arabic; Malay	Religious broadcasting	Nationwide
92.3 MHz (Kuala Lumpur); 96.3 MHz (Selangor)	YES	Minnal FM	RTM	Tamil	Adult contemporary Infotainment	Peninsular Malaysia
92.6 MHz	YES	Negeri FM	RTM	Malay	Adult contemporary News/Talk	Negeri Sembilan, Kuala Lumpur, Parts of Selangor, Malacca, Pahang and Northern Parts of Johor
92.9 MHz	YES	Hitz	Astro Audio	English	CHR (English/K-pop)	Nationwide
93.9 MHz	YES	Bernama Radio	Bernama	Malay	News/Talk	Klang Valley, Kuching and Kota Kinabalu
94.5 MHz	YES	Mix	Astro Audio	English	Modern adult contemporary	Nationwide
95.8 MHz	YES	Fly FM	Media Prima Audio	English	Hot adult contemporary	Nationwide
96.7 MHz	YES	Sinar	Astro Audio	Malay	Modern adult contemporary	Nationwide
97.2 MHz	YES	KL FM	RTM	Malay	Adult contemporary News/Talk	Kuala Lumpur, Parts of Selangor & Negeri Sembilan
97.6 MHz	YES	Hot FM	Media Prima Audio	Malay	CHR (M-pop/I-pop)	Nationwide
98.8 MHz	YES	988	Star Media Radio Group	Mandarin; Cantonese	CHR (C-pop/Cantopop); Infotainment	Nationwide
99.3 MHz	YES	Raaga	Astro Audio	Tamil	Adult contemporary (Indian pop); Infotainment	West Peninsular Malaysia, Parts of Pahang & Kelantan
100.9 MHz	YES	Selangor FM	RTM	Malay	Adult contemporary News/Talk	Selangor, Kuala Lumpur, Southern Perak, Parts of Negeri Sembilan & West Pahang
101.3 MHz	YES	Kool FM	Media Prima Audio	Malay	Soft adult contemporary (M-pop); Talk	Klang Valley, Penang, Alor Setar, Kuching, Ipoh, Malacca & Johor Bahru
101.8 MHz	YES	My	Astro Audio	Mandarin; Cantonese	CHR (C-pop/Cantopop)	Nationwide
103.0 MHz	YES	Melody	Astro Audio	Mandarin; Cantonese	Soft adult contemporary	Nationwide
103.3 MHz	YES	Era	Astro Audio	Malay	CHR (M-pop/I-pop)	Nationwide
104.1 MHz	YES	Best FM	Suara Johor Sdn Bhd	Malay	Adult contemporary News/Talk	Johor, Malacca, Negeri Sembilan, Singapore & Batam; Indonesia
104.9 MHz	YES	Zayan	Astro Audio	Malay	Religious broadcasting	Nationwide
105.3 MHz	YES	Suria	Star Media Radio Group	Malay	Hot adult contemporary News/Talk	Nationwide
105.7 MHz	YES	Lite	Astro Audio	English	Soft adult contemporary	Nationwide
107.5 MHz	YES	Pahang FM	RTM	Malay	Adult contemporary News/Talk	Parts of Terengganu, South Perak and Parts of Negeri Sembilan
107.9 MHz	YES	Rakita	Radio Kita Sdn Bhd	Malay	Indie/Alternative	Kuala Lumpur, Parts of Selangor and Negeri Sembilan

=== Amplitude Modulation (AM) stations ===
Malaysia does not own any AM stations since the last remaining AM station by Sabah FM was closed by RTM in 2015. All of the AM stations able to be received in Malaysia are from other Asian countries with high power transmitters. Reception is much better at night.

Frequency	Station	Operator	Country of origin	Transmitter location	Language	Format
5012 MHz (Shortwave)	Radio Klasik	RTM	Malaysia	IBC, Malaysia	Malay	Classic hits (Oldies); News (at top of the hour)
15420 kHz (Shortwave)	Radio Free Sarawak (RFS)	Radio Free Sarawak	Malaysia	Unknown (Many ham radio operators had traced the transmissions to the islands of Palau and a transmitter site in Romania.)	Malay; Iban	Adult contemporary music News
1242 kHz	Voice of Vietnam (VOV)	Voice of Vietnam	Vietnam	Can Tho, Vietnam	Vietnamese	Folk music News
1575 kHz	Voice of America (VOA)	Voice of America	United States	Bangkok, Thailand	Various with mostly American English	Smooth adult contemporary News
891 kHz; 981 kHz	Sor. Wor. Thor	Radio Thailand	Thailand	Saraburi, Thailand (891); Yala, Thailand (981)	Thai	Traditional and folk music (mostly Phleng Thai sakon); News/Talk
603 kHz; 684 kHz	China Radio International (CRI)	China Radio International	China	Hainan, China	Cantonese (603); English (684); Khmer (684); Vietnamese (684)	News
918 kHz	National Radio of Kampuchea (NRK)	National Radio of Kampuchea	Cambodia	Phnom Penh, Cambodia	Khmer	Folk and classical music News
873 kHz	Voice of Vietnam 4	Voice of Vietnam	Vietnam	Can Tho, Vietnam	Vietnamese; Khmer	Adult contemporary music Talk
1503 kHz	Radio Taiwan International (RTI)	Radio Taiwan International	Taiwan	Fangliao, Taiwan	Mandarin; Burmese; Vietnamese	News

=== Internet radio stations ===
Station	Operator	Language	Genre	Available
Astro Awani Radio	Astro Audio	Malay; English	News	Syok
Radio Muzik	RTM	Malay	Easy listening	RTM Klik
Radio Bisnes	RTM	Malay	Financial news and talk	RTM Klik
Radio Gema Borneo	RTM	Malay	Adult contemporary (Borneo music)	RTM Klik
SYOK Bayu	Astro Audio	Malay Sabah	CHR (M-pop)	Syok
SYOK Classic Rock	Astro Audio	Malay; English	Soft adult contemporary (Classic Rock)	Syok
SYOK Gold	Astro Audio	Malay; English	Soft adult contemporary (50s, 60s and 70s Music)	Syok
SYOK India Beat	Astro Audio	Hindi	AC (Indian pop)	Syok
SYOK Jazz	Astro Audio	Malay; English	AC (Jazz)	Syok
SYOK Kenalayang	Astro Audio	Iban	CHR (M-pop)	Syok
SYOK Opus	Astro Audio	Malay; English	Oldies	Syok
SYOK Osai	Astro Audio	Malay; English	Variety	Syok

== Stations (other states) ==
=== FM stations ===
Station	Frequency	Operator	Language	Area served
Johor FM	101.9 MHz (Johor Bahru & Singapore); 105.3 MHz (Northern Johor); 92.1 MHz (Eastern Johor)	RTM	Malay	Johor, Southern parts of Negeri Sembilan, Parts of Malacca and Singapore
Kedah FM	97.5 MHz (Kedah, Perlis, Penang & Northern Perak); 90.5 MHz (Baling); 105.7 MHz (Langkawi); 88.5 MHz (Bandar Baharu); 105.1 MHz (Sik)	RTM	Malay	Kedah, Penang, Perlis, Satun, Thailand and parts of Perak
Kelantan FM	102.9 MHz (Kota Bharu); 97.3 MHz (Central Kelantan); 88.1 MHz (Chiku & Felda Paloh); 92.0 MHz (Gua Musang); 90.0 MHz (Jeli); 107.1 MHz (Eastern Kelantan)	RTM	Malay	Kelantan, Northern parts of Terengganu, Northern parts of Pahang, Narathiwat, Thailand. Worldwide on (Internet radio)
Langkawi FM	104.8 MHz	RTM	Malay	Langkawi Island, Parts of Perlis and Northern Parts of Kedah
Melaka FM	102.3 MHz	RTM	Malay	Malacca, Northern Johor and Southern parts of Negeri Sembilan
Mutiara FM	95.7 MHz (Central & South Penang); 93.9 MHz (North Penang)	RTM	Malay	Penang, Kedah, parts of Perak
Pahang FM	104.1 MHz (Eastern Pahang); 107.5 MHz (Western & Central Pahang, Klang Valley); 92.0 MHz (Maran); 100.3 MHz (Cameron Highlands); 102.2 MHz (Raub)	RTM	Malay	Pahang, Klang Valley, Southern Parts of Terengganu, South Perak and Parts of Negeri Sembilan
Perak FM	95.6 MHz (Ipoh); 104.1 MHz (Northern Perak); 97.3 MHz (Tapah); 94.7 MHz (Cameron Highlands); 94.2 MHz (Lenggong); 96.2 MHz (Gerik); 89.6 MHz (Tanjung Malim)	RTM	Malay	Perak, Cameron Highlands district Pahang, Parts of Penang, Northern Part of Selangor, Southern Parts of Kedah
Perlis FM	102.9 MHz	RTM	Malay	Perlis & Northern Parts of Kedah
Terengganu FM	88.7 MHz (Kuala Terengganu); 97.7 MHz (Southern Terengganu); 90.7 MHz (Kemaman); 96.2 MHz (Northern Terengganu); 88.9 MHz (Hulu Besut)	RTM	Malay	Terengganu, Parts of Kelantan, East Pahang
Sabah FM	various	RTM	Malay	Sabah
Sabah V FM	various	RTM	English, Kadazan, Dusun, Mandarin, Bajau, Murut	Sabah
VOKFM Sabah	106.6 MHz		Malay	Kota Kinabalu
Sandakan FM	90.1 MHz	RTM	Malay	Sandakan
Tawau FM	100.1 MHz	RTM	Malay	Tawau
Labuan FM	89.4 MHz	RTM	Malay	Labuan
Keningau FM	98.4 MHz	RTM	Malay, Dusun, Murut	Sabah Interior Division
Sarawak FM	various	RTM	Malay	Sarawak
Red FM	various	RTM	Chinese (Mandarin), English	Sarawak
Sibu FM	87.6 MHz	RTM	Malay, Iban & Chinese (Mandarin)	Sibu, Mukah, Sarikei & Kapit
Wai FM	Various	RTM	Iban, Kayan, Kenyah & Bidayuh	Sarawak
Miri FM	95.7 MHz	RTM	Malay, Chinese (Mandarin), Iban, Kayah & Kenyah	Miri & Bintulu
Bintulu FM	97.5 MHz	RTM	Malay	Miri & Bintulu
Sri Aman FM	89.5 MHz	RTM	Malay	Sri Aman & Betong
Limbang FM	104.9 MHz	RTM	Malay, Bisaya & Lun Bawang	Limbang & Lawas
Cats FM	99.3 (Kuching), 88.4 / 99.9 MHz (Sibu), 93.3 MHz (Miri), 88.3 MHz (Bintulu) and 88.7 MHz (Limbang)	Kristal Harta Sdn Bhd	Malay, Iban, Mandarin Chinese	Sarawak, parts of Labuan & Kota Kinabalu, West Kalimantan & Brunei
THR Gegar	88.8 MHz (Kuantan); 106.8 MHz (Kuala Terengganu); 88.1 MHz (Kota Bharu)	Astro Audio	Malay	Parts of Kelantan, Terengganu, East Pahang
kupikupifm	92.5 MHz (Kuching); 96.3 MHz (Kota Kinabalu); 106.0 MHz (Seremban)	Ooga X Sdn Bhd	Kadazan-Dusun; Chinese; Murut; Malay; English	Kuching, Kota Kinabalu & Seremban
Manis FM	95.1 MHz (Kuantan); 102.0 MHz (Kuala Terengganu); 90.6 MHz (Kota Bharu)	Nusa Network Sdn Bhd	Malay	South Thailand, Kelantan (Kota Bharu, Pasir Mas, Tumpat, Jeli, Tanah Merah, Bachok, Pasir Puteh, Machang & Northern parts of Kuala Krai), Terengganu & Pahang
Molek FM	100.4 MHz (Kuantan); 93.6 MHz (Kuala Terengganu); 105.1 MHz (Kota Bharu)	Media Prima Audio	Malay	Part of Kelantan, Terengganu, East Pahang
TEA FM	102.7 MHz (Kuching); 100.7 MHz (Sibu)	Tea FM Radio Sdn Bhd	Mandarin; English	Kuching & Sibu

== International radio stations (Defunct) ==
Frequency	Station	Operator	Language	Area served
6100 kHz; 6175 kHz; 9750 kHz; 11885 kHz; 15295 kHz	Voice of Malaysia	RTM	English, Mandarin, Indonesian, Thai, Arabic, Tagalog, Burmese, Malay	Worldwide

== Defunct radio stations ==
Station	Frequency	Operator	Language	Format	Area served	Note
BBC World Service	15335, 9740, 6195, 11750 (AM)	BBC	Malay	News	Klang Valley (Now Nationwide)	Malay-language radio stations stretching over 50 years from the British colonial period through independence, between 2 May 1941 until 31 March 1991. Now replaced by English language and can be heard nationwide.
TalkRadio	101.8 MHz	AMP Radio Networks	English	Talk	Klang Valley	Short-lived radio station aired between 1997 and 1998. The FM slot was taken over by "MY FM (now MY)".
Classic Rock	103.3 MHz	AMP Radio Networks	English	Music	Klang Valley	Short-lived radio station aired between 1997 and 1998. Classic Rock can be heard on Astro and on Internet Radio (via Syok). Its FM slot was taken over by "ERA FM (now ERA)".
RfM	98.8 MHz, then 91.5 MHz and lastly was 104.9 MHz	Radio Rediffusion Sdn. Bhd	Malay; English; Chinese	Talk; Music	Klang Valley	Radio Rediffusion Sdn. Bhd was taken over by The Star Publication Berhad and changed its name to STAR RfM Sdn. Bhd in 2003. The Rfm brand name was changed to "Red 104.9" and is now known as "Red FM". In 2001, "Ikim.FM" took over the previous Rfm slot.
Time Highway Radio (original)	99.3 MHz	Time Highway Radio Sdn. Bhd.	English; Malay; Chinese	Talk; Music	West Peninsular Malaysia	Time Highway Radio was taken over by Astro Radio in 2005. It became a Tamil-language station known as "THR Raaga" on the West Coast of Peninsular Malaysia. On the East Coast of Peninsular Malaysia it became known as "THR Gegar", broadcasting in Malay. Both stations later dropped the "THR" brand and simply became "Raaga" and "Gegar" respectively.
WOW FM/WA FM	97.6 MHz	Synchrosound Studio Sdn. Bhd.	English (WOW FM); Mandarin (WA FM)	Talk; Music	Nationwide	WOW FM/WA FM was taken over by Media Prima Berhad in late 2005 and then became a Malay-language radio station known as "Hot FM".
Wanita FM	88.1 MHz	Radio Wanita Berhad	Malay	Talk; Music	Klang Valley	Wanita FM was taken over by Media Prima Berhad in January 2009 and then became a Chinese-language radio station known as "One FM (now 8FM)".
XFM	103.0 MHz	AMP Radio Networks	Malay	Talk; Music	Klang Valley	XFM FM frequency and Astro slot was taken over by the sister Chinese station "Melody FM (now Melody)" on 9 July 2012 for test transmission, and began broadcasting on 15 August. XFM could be heard as an Internet-only station before it stopped streaming in 2017.
Ultra FM	101.3 MHz	Copyright Laureate Sdn. Bhd.	Malay	Music	Klang Valley	The owner of Ultra FM, along with Pi Mai FM was acquired by Media Prima in October 2015. In early March 2016, it became Kool FM, a Malay-language radio station.
Pi Mai FM	90.2 MHz	Copyright Laureate Sdn. Bhd.	Malay	Music	Penang	Pi Mai FM ceased transmission in October 2015, and the frequency was used by Kool FM for listeners in Penang. The radio station also can be heard in Kedah and Perlis.
Capital FM	88.9 MHz	STAR Rfm Sdn.Bhd (Star Radio Group, The Star)	English; Malay	Music	Klang Valley and Penang	Capital FM ceased transmission in October 2015, and it has since been sold to Astro Radio by Star Radio Group and then became a Chinese-language radio station "goXuan FM (now goXuan)".
Red FM	104.9 MHz	STAR Rfm Sdn.Bhd (Star Radio Group, The Star)	English	Music	Peninsular Malaysia	Red FM ceased transmission in December 2015, and it has since been sold to Astro Radio by Star Radio Group and then became a Malay-language radio station "Zayan FM (now Zayan)".
iM4U FM	107.9 MHz	iM4U Radio Sdn. Bhd	Malay	Talk; Music	Klang Valley	iM4U FM ceased broadcasting on 29 June 2018. It became a Malay-language radio station known as "Rakita" and began broadcasting on 8 January 2019.
Buletin FM	93.6 MHz	Media Prima	Malay	News; Talk	Kuala Terengganu	Buletin FM ceased transmission in Kuala Terengganu on 29 November 2021, and the frequency is now used by Molek FM.
Buletin FM	88.6 MHz	Media Prima	Malay	News; Talk	Kota Bharu	From 29 November 2021, Buletin FM was replaced by Molek FM and the frequency was changed to 105.1 MHz in Kota Bharu. Hot FM now broadcasts on 88.6 MHz.
Hot FM Kelantan	105.1 MHz	Media Prima	Malay	Top 40 (CHR)	Kota Bharu	The original frequency of Hot FM in Kelantan, 105.1 MHz was taken over by the Malay-language radio station "Molek FM" on 29 November 2021 for test transmission, and began broadcasting on 9 January 2022. Hot FM now broadcasts on 88.6 MHz.
8FM	100.4 MHz	Media Prima	Mandarin; Cantonese	Infotainment; Top 40 (CHR)	Kuantan	8FM ceased transmission in Kuantan on 25 September 2022, and the frequency is now used by Molek FM for listeners in Pahang. The radio station also can be heard in Southern Terengganu.
KK12FM	89.5 MHz		English; Malay (Sabah Malay)		Kota Kinabalu	KK12FM ceased transmission on 1 March 2023.
CITYPlus	92.5 MHz	OogaX	Chinese	Talk radio	Kuching	CityPlus FM ceased transmission in Kuching in April 2020. The frequency is now used by kupikupifm. It began broadcasting on 9 June 2023.
Eight FM	105.3 MHz	Media Prima	Chinese	CHR (C-pop/Cantopop)	Johor Bahru	Eight FM ceased transmission in Johor Bahru, Malacca and Ipoh on 27 October 2025, and the frequency is now used by Kool FM.
Eight FM	88.1 MHz	Media Prima	Chinese	CHR (C-pop/Cantopop)	Malacca	Eight FM ceased transmission in Johor Bahru, Malacca and Ipoh on 27 October 2025, and the frequency is now used by Kool FM.
Eight FM	87.6 MHz	Media Prima	Chinese	CHR (C-pop/Cantopop)	Ipoh	Eight FM ceased transmission in Johor Bahru, Malacca and Ipoh on 27 October 2025, and the frequency is now used by Kool FM.
CITYPlus	106.0 MHz	OogaX	Chinese	Talk radio	Seremban	CityPlus FM temporarily suspended transmission in Seremban from 13 February to 3 September 2026. The frequency was taken over by the Sabahan Malay's radio station "kupikupifm" on 12 September 2026 for test transmission, and began broadcasting on 13 October. The radio station also can be heard in Klang Valley.
