= Mutiara FM =

George Town; Malaysia
- Broadcast area: Peninsular Malaysia (Penang)
- Frequency: 95.7 MHz

Programming
- Language: Malay
- Format: Talk, Top 40 (CHR)

Ownership
- Owner: Radio Televisyen Malaysia
- Sister stations: National: Ai FM; Asyik FM; Minnal FM; Nasional FM; Radio Klasik; TraXX FM; Regional: Perlis FM; Kedah FM; Langkawi FM; Perak FM; Kelantan FM; Terengganu FM; Pahang FM; Selangor FM; KL FM; Negeri FM; Melaka FM; Johor FM; Sarawak FM; Red FM; Wai FM Iban; Wai FM Bidayuh; Sri Aman FM; Sibu FM; Bintulu FM; Miri FM; Limbang FM; Labuan FM; Sabah FM; Sabah V FM; Keningau FM; Sandakan FM; Tawau FM

Links
- Webcast: rtmklik.rtm.gov.my/radio/negeri/mutiara-fm
- Website: mutiarafm.rtm.gov.my

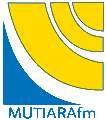
Mutiara FM logo (2005–2021)

Mutiara FM (translated as Pearl FM, stylized as MUTIARA fm) is a Malay language-regional radio station operated by Radio Televisyen Malaysia, broadcasting out of George Town, Penang in Malaysia.

== Etymology ==
The station was formerly known as Radio Malaysia Georgetown and Radio Malaysia Pulau Pinang. The current name, used since 1 April 2005 after rebranding, is based on the state's nickname in the Malay language – Pulau Mutiara (The Island of Pearls).

== Frequency ==
Frequencies	Broadcast	Transmitter	Transmitter power
95.7 MHz	George Town, Jelutong, Gurney Drive, Ayer Itam, Bayan Lepas, Batu Maung, Central Seberang Perai and North Seberang Perai, Penang; Kulim, and Kuala Ketil, Kedah and Bagan Serai, Perak	Bukit Penara	1 kW
93.9 MHz	Tanjung Tokong, Tanjung Bungah, Batu Feringghi and Teluk Bahang, Penang; Sungai Petani, Kedah and Kuala Sepetang and Taiping, Perak	Mount Jerai	0.1 KW
90.9 MHz	Balik Pulau and Teluk Kumbar, Penang and Parit Buntar, Perak	Bukit Genting	0.1 KW
