= Melaka FM =

Radio station in Malacca City, Malacca, Malaysia

Coordinates: 2.2121256°N 102.2558798°E

Malacca City; Malaysia
- Broadcast area: Peninsular Malaysia (Malacca)
- Frequency: 102.3 MHz

Programming
- Format: Talk; Top 40 (CHR)

Ownership
- Owner: Radio Televisyen Malaysia
- Sister stations: National: Ai FM; Asyik FM; Minnal FM; Nasional FM; Radio Klasik; TraXX FM; Regional: Perlis FM; Kedah FM; Langkawi FM; Mutiara FM; Perak FM; Kelantan FM; Terengganu FM; Pahang FM; Selangor FM; KL FM; Negeri FM; Johor FM; Sarawak FM; Red FM; Wai FM Iban; Wai FM Bidayuh; Sri Aman FM; Sibu FM; Bintulu FM; Miri FM; Limbang FM; Labuan FM; Sabah FM; Sabah V FM; Keningau FM; Sandakan FM; Tawau FM

History
- First air date: 1946
- Former frequencies: AM 1008 kHz

Links
- Webcast: rtmklik.rtm.gov.my/radio/negeri/melaka-fm
- Website: melakafm.rtm.gov.my

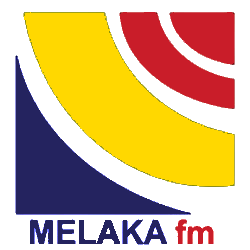
Melaka FM logo (2005–2021).

Melaka FM (English: Malacca FM) is a regional Malay language radio station operated by Radio Televisyen Malaysia out of the state capital of Malacca, Malaysia. Broadcasting started in 1946 from the Stadthuys building. The Station transmits on FM 102.3 MHz from Gunung Ledang. The Melaka FM transmissions were formerly on AM 1008 kHz, until 2002. The Station can be received statewide as well as in some parts of Johor, Negeri Sembilan, south west Pahang (Bandar Tun Abdul Razak and Bandar Muadzam Shah) and part of Selangor (Sungai Pelek and Tanjung Sepat).

== Etymology ==
The Station was formerly known as Radio Malaysia Melaka and Radio 3 Melaka.

== History ==
Radio Malaya Malacca began its first broadcast from the Stadthuys in 1946, which was transmitted using a 25 watt powered transmission tower in Malacca City Centre. In 1948, the Station was moved to a wooden building in Bandar Hilir when Stadthuys was repurposed as a court building, and was transmitted using a 300 watt powered transmission tower at Malacca Straits Inn. Radio Malaya Malacca was rebranded as Radio Malaysia Melaka, when Malacca became a part of the newly formed Federation of Malaysia on 16 September 1963. Radio Malaysia Melaka moved to its present location at Jalan Mata Kuching (now Jalan Taming Sari), with the building officiated by Yang di-Pertua Negeri of Malacca – Tun Haji Abdul Malek Yusof, on 17 August 1965 and broadcast using AM Frequency 1008 kHz with a power of 10 kilowatt through a transmission tower located at Batu Berendam.

== Frequency ==
Frequency	Broadcast	Transmitter
102.3 MHz	Entirety of Malacca and northern Johor	Mount Ledang
