= Pahang FM =

Kuantan; Malaysia
- Broadcast area: Peninsular Malaysia (Pahang)

Programming
- Format: Talk; Top 40 (CHR)

Ownership
- Owner: Radio Televisyen Malaysia
- Sister stations: National: Ai FM; Asyik FM; Minnal FM; Nasional FM; Radio Klasik; TraXX FM; Regional: Perlis FM; Kedah FM; Langkawi FM; Mutiara FM; Perak FM; Kelantan FM; Terengganu FM; Selangor FM; KL FM; Negeri FM; Melaka FM; Johor FM; Sarawak FM; Red FM; Wai FM Iban; Wai FM Bidayuh; Sri Aman FM; Sibu FM; Bintulu FM; Miri FM; Limbang FM; Labuan FM; Sabah FM; Sabah V FM; Keningau FM; Sandakan FM

History
- First air date: 15 October 1992; 33 years ago

Links
- Webcast: rtmklik.rtm.gov.my/radio/negeri/pahang-fm
- Website: pahangfm.rtm.gov.my

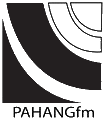
Pahang FM logo (2005–2021)

Pahang FM (stylised as PAHANG fm) is a Malay-language radio station in the state of Pahang, Malaysia. The station is maintained by the State Radio Televisyen Malaysia Pahang. The station is broadcast from Kuala Lumpur throughout several of the country's cities.

== History ==
A radio station was established in Pahang in July 1966 by the Government of Malaysia. In an effort to expand coverage in the areas, the station transmitting Kuala Lipis established in 1974 and completed in Depok on the year 1977. The RTM transmission station in Jerantut AM (846 kHz) is not connected to the RTM release Kuantan and eastern districts, with headquarters in Kuala Terengganu RTM instead connects directly from the National Network RTM Kuala Lumpur.

Stations Jerantut was closed on 1 April 1991. FM transmitting station was launched in Depok then connected to the RTM Kuantan broadcast. Recognising the power transmission capacity in just 10 Kilowatt Station Kuantan, then set up FM transmitters in Bukit Pelindung Mono Kuantan at the end of the year 1990 and in turn Bentung Gunung Ulu Kali in 1991.

With OLTE system (Optical Line Terminal) installed on 15 October 1992. All broadcasts are received in monaural able to be followed in FM Stereo, almost the entire state can follow the travelling Pahang Kuantan.

== Frequency ==
Frequencies	Location	Transmitter sites
88.0 MHz	Muadzam Shah, Pahang	Bukit Sembilan
91.9 MHz	Kuala Rompin, Pahang & Mersing, Johor	TM Kuala Rompin
92.0 MHz	Maran, Pahang	Bukit Senggora
92.7 MHz	Jerantut, Pahang	Bukit Istana
95.5 MHz	Gambang, Pahang, Sri Jaya & Chini	Bukit Sulai
96.8 MHz	Pulau Tioman, Pahang	RTM Pulau Tioman
100.3 MHz	Cameron Highlands, Pahang	Gunung Brinchang
102.2 MHz	Raub, Pahang	Bukit Fraser
104.1 MHz	Kuantan, Pahang	Bukit Pelindung
107.2 MHz	Damak, Pahang	Bukit Botak
107.5 MHz	Klang Valley & Kuala Lumpur	Gunung Ulu Kali
