= Johor FM =

Coordinates: 1°28′50.8″N 103°44′18.0″E

- Johor Bahru; Malaysia
- Broadcast area: Peninsular Malaysia (Johor Bahru,/Johor Bahru District) Singapore and part of Batam, Riau, Batam Island, Riau Island, Indonesia

Programming
- Language: Malay
- Format: Talk; Top 40 (CHR)

Ownership
- Owner: Radio Televisyen Malaysia
- Sister stations: National: Ai FM; Asyik FM; Minnal FM; Nasional FM; Radio Klasik; TraXX FM; Regional: Perlis FM; Kedah FM; Langkawi FM; Mutiara FM; Perak FM; Kelantan FM; Terengganu FM; Pahang FM; Selangor FM; KL FM; Negeri FM; Melaka FM; Sarawak FM; Red FM; Wai FM Iban; Wai FM Bidayuh; Sri Aman FM; Sibu FM; Bintulu FM; Miri FM; Limbang FM; Labuan FM; Sabah FM; Sabah V FM; Keningau FM; Sandakan FM; Tawau FM

History
- First air date: 7 November 1963; 62 years ago (as Johor Bahru Station)

Links
- Webcast: rtmklik.rtm.gov.my/radio/negeri/johor-fm
- Website: johorfm.rtm.gov.my

Radio Malaysia Johor logo (2000-2005)

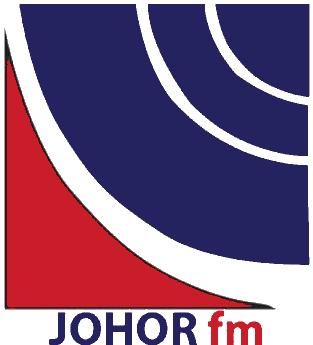
Johor FM logo (2005–2021)

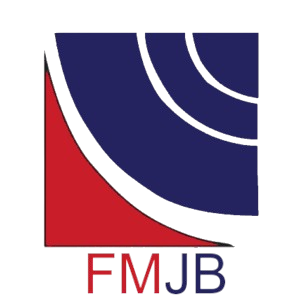
FM Stereo Johor Bahru logo (2005-2011)

Johor FM is a Johor-state Malay language radio station operated by Radio Televisyen Malaysia out of the Johor state capital Johor Bahru in Malaysia. It features local news and Malaysian music. Johor FM was one of the first regional radio stations in Malaysia.

== Etymology ==
The Station was formerly known as Radio Malaysia Johor and Radio 3 Johor Bahru.

== History ==
- 7 November 1963 - Stesen Johor Bahru went on air for the first time on AM.
- 4 June 1966 - Radio Malaysia Johor Bahru was officially inaugurated by the 23rd Sultan of Johor's, Sultan Ismail Al-Khalidi Ibni Ibrahim Al-Masyhur.
- 30 August 1988 - Radio Malaysia Johor Bahru went FM stereo and transmitted using antennas brought from England.
- 20 October 1988 - Radio Malaysia Johor Bahru was split into 2-radio stations: its FM stereo radio transmitter was taken over by a new station called FM Stereo Johor Bahru (FMJB) which exclusively transmitted in South Johor and Singapore. Radio Malaysia Johor Bahru (RMJB) went back to the old AM 828 kHz.
- 31 August 1989 - Radio Malaysia Johor Bahru changed its name to Radio 3 Johor Bahru.
- 1 January 1991 - Radio 3 Johor Bahru returned to FM.
- 27 July 1992 - The ground-breaking ceremony for the Sultan Iskandar Broadcasting Complex was held. The complex costs RM15.6 million, housing three radio studios and a 1,000 seat audiotorium.
- 1 January 1993 - Radio 3 Johor Bahru started broadcasting 18 hours a day from 06:00 to 00:00 MST.
- 1 January 1994 - Radio 3 Johor Bahru and its complement station FM Stereo Johor Bahru (107.5 MHz) moved to the brand new Kompleks Penyiaran Sultan Iskandar (Sultan Iskandar Broadcasting Complex).
- 3 April 1997 - The Ministry of Information plans to convert FM Stereo Johor Bahru (known as Radio 2 Johor Bahru) into an English radio station to promote the country internationally. It was also planned to be privatised.
- 5 April 1997 - The Sultan Iskandar Broadcasting Complex was officially opened by the then-Sultan of Johor, Almarhum Sultan Iskandar.
- 31 August 1998 - Radio 3 Johor Bahru changed its name to Radio Malaysia Johor (RMJ).
- 2 June 2005 - Radio Malaysia Johor came to be known by its current name Johor FM.
- September 2006 - The Radio Televisyen Malaysia 317-metre high transmitting mast at the Johor Bahru station was dismantled.
- March 2011 - FM Stereo Johor Bahru ceased broadcasts.

== Frequency ==
Frequencies	Broadcast	Transmitter
92.1 MHz	Eastern Johor (Mersing District: Mersing, Kahang, Jemaluang, Iskandar Marine Park islands of Sibu, Babi, Penyabong, Tinggi, Aur, and Pemanggil; Padang Endau and Endau), southern Pahang (Kuala Rompin), eastern Pahang (Pekan)	Bukit Tinggi
101.9 MHz	Johor Bahru District (Johor Bahru, Tebrau, Plentong, Kangkar Pulai, Pulai, Iskandar Puteri, Gelang Patah, Ulu Tiram, Pasir Gudang, Masai, Sungai Tiram, Skudai, Tanjung Kupang), Kulai District (Kulai, Senai, Bukit Batu, Indahpura and Sedenak), Kota Tinggi District (Kota Tinggi, Desaru, Bandar Tenggara, Bandar Penawar, Lok Heng, Sedili Kecil and Sedili Besar), Kluang District (Kluang, Paloh, Layang-Layang and Simpang Renggam), parts of Batu Pahat District ( Rengit, Sri Gading, Parit Sulong, Tongkang Pechah, Parit Yaani, Parit Raja, Machap and Ayer Hitam), Pontian District (Pontian Kechil, Benut and Kukup) and Singapore	Mount Pulai
105.3 MHz	Northern Johor (Tangkak District: Tangkak, Bukit Gambir, Sungai Mati, Sagil and Gersik; Muar District: Muar, Pagoh, Lenga, Bukit Kepong, Parit Jawa and Bakri; Batu Pahat District: Batu Pahat, Yong Peng,, Semerah,; Segamat District: Segamat, Jementah, Batu Anam, Buloh Kasap, Chaah and Bekok), southeastern Negeri Sembilan (Gemas and the entirety of Tampin District), and parts of Malacca (Jasin District: (Merlimau, Sungai Rambai and Nyalas; Alor Gajah District: Alor Gajah, Masjid Tanah and Durian Tunggal; Melaka Tengah District: Ayer Keroh, Batu Berendam and Malacca City)	Mount Ophir
