= Sarawak FM =

Kuching; Malaysia
- Broadcast area: East Malaysia (Sarawak)
- Frequency: Varies depending on its region

Programming
- Languages: Malay and Melanau
- Format: Talk; Top 40 (CHR)

Ownership
- Owner: Radio Televisyen Malaysia
- Sister stations: National: Ai FM; Asyik FM; Minnal FM; Nasional FM; Radio Klasik; TraXX FM; Regional: Perlis FM; Kedah FM; Langkawi FM; Mutiara FM; Perak FM; Kelantan FM; Terengganu FM; Pahang FM; Selangor FM; KL FM; Negeri FM; Melaka FM; Johor FM; Red FM; Wai FM Iban; Wai FM Bidayuh; Sri Aman FM; Sibu FM; Bintulu FM; Miri FM; Limbang FM; Labuan FM; Sabah FM; Sabah V FM; Keningau FM; Sandakan FM; Tawau FM

History
- First air date: 8 June 1954; 71 years ago

Links
- Webcast: rtmklik.rtm.gov.my/radio/negeri/sarawak-fm
- Website: sarawakfm.rtm.gov.my

Sarawak FM logo (2005–2021)

Sarawak FM (formerly known as Radio Sarawak and Radio Malaysia Sarawak; stylised as SARAWAK fm) is a Malay language radio station operated by Radio Televisyen Malaysia serving as the main radio station of the state of Sarawak. The Station was launched on 8 June 1954 and became part of the Radio Malaysia network on 16 September 1963, when Sarawak formed the Federation of Malaysia with Malaya, Sabah and Singapore. The station covers all of Sarawak with a 24 hours broadcast which airs Malaysian and international music.

== Radio Frequencies ==
Frequency	Broadcast area	Transmitter site
88.1 MHz	Bukit Lambir, Miri	Bukit Lambir
88.1 MHz	Kuala Belait & Seria, Negara Brunei Darussalam	Bukit Lambir
88.9 MHz	Kuching, Sarawak	Gunung Serapi
89.9 MHz	Mukah, Sarawak	Mukah
91.5 MHz	Sarikei, Sarawak	Bukit Kayu Malam
92.7 MHz	Kapit, Kapit	Bukit Kapit
93.7 MHz	Bintulu, Sarawak	Bukit Setiam
94.4 MHz	Betong, Sarawak	Spaoh
94.8 MHz	Serian, Sarawak	Bukit Ampangan
95.1 MHz	Stapang, Sibu	Bukit Singalang
95.7 MHz	Song, Kapit	Bukit Song
97.5 MHz	Lawas, Limbang	Bukit Tiong
100.0 MHz	Limbang, Sarawak	Bukit Sagang Rudang
100.3 MHz	Miri, Sarawak	RTM Miri
100.3 MHz	Sri Aman, Sarawak	Bukit Temudok
101.5 MHz	Sibu, Sarawak	Bukit Lima
101.5 MHz	Limbang, Sarawak	Bukit Mas
101.5 MHz	Bandar Seri Begawan, Negara Brunei Darussalam, Sarawak	Bukit Mas
105.4 MHz	Belaga, Sarawak & Kapit, Sarawak	Belaga

=== Television ===
TV Platform	Channel
myFreeview	709
