= Selangor FM =

- Kuala Lumpur; Malaysia
- Broadcast area: Peninsular Malaysia (Selangor) Federal Territory
- Frequency: 100.9 MHz

Programming
- Format: News; Talk; Full-service; Top 40 (CHR)

Ownership
- Owner: Radio Televisyen Malaysia
- Operator: vacant Director
- Sister stations: National: Ai FM; Asyik FM; Minnal FM; Nasional FM; Radio Klasik; TraXX FM; Regional: Perlis FM; Kedah FM; Langkawi FM; Mutiara FM; Perak FM; Kelantan FM; Terengganu FM; Pahang FM; KL FM; Negeri FM; Melaka FM; Johor FM; Sarawak FM; Red FM; Wai FM Iban; Wai FM Bidayuh; Sri Aman FM; Sibu FM; Bintulu FM; Miri FM; Limbang FM; Labuan FM; Sabah FM; Sabah V FM; Keningau FM; Sandakan FM; Tawau FM

History
- First air date: 24 July 1993; 33 years ago

Links
- Webcast: rtmklik.rtm.gov.my/radio/negeri/selangor-fm
- Website: selangorfm.rtm.gov.my

Selangor FM (stylized as SELANGOR fm) is a regional Malay language-radio station operated by Radio Televisyen Malaysia out of the Selangor state station in Angkasapuri. The Station transmits on FM 100.9 MHz from the Gunung Ulu Kali transmitter site and can be heard in Selangor, Kuala Lumpur, the northern part of Negeri Sembilan, the southern part of Perak and the western part of Pahang. The Station can be heard using the RTM Klik application on mobile phones.

On 24 July 1993, two years after the radio station started broadcasting, it was officially launched by Menteri Besar (First Minister), Tan Sri Muhammad bin Muhammad Taib.

== Etymology ==
The Station was previously known as Radio Malaysia Selangor (RMS), Radio Malaysia Kawasan Tengah and Radio 3 Shah Alam.

== Organisation Information ==
2025 Organisation List
Position	Name
Director	vacant
Deputy Director	Norianti Binti Nordin
Head of program division	Yusmawati binti Yunus
As. engineer	Samsudin bin Hamid
Program producer	Nurazila Binti Abd Aziz
Program producer	Mohd Farid Bun Ahmad
Program producer	
As. administrator(Finance)	Rozilawati binti Mamat

== List of Segments ==
Selangor FM Weekdays
Segment Name	Start	End
Inspirasi	6.00AM	10.00AM
Prisma	10.00AM	2.00PM
Ekspresi	2.00PM	5.00PM
Dimensi	5.00PM	8.00PM
Santai	8.00PM	12.00AM

== Frequency ==
Frequency	Broadcast	Transmitter
100.9 MHz	Entirety of Selangor, Kuala Lumpur and western Pahang	Gunung Ulu Kali

== Controversy ==
=== Forced to move out from present location ===
On 12 April 2008, the Menteri Besar of Selangor, Tan Sri Khalid Ibrahim, warned the Radio Station to come up with a weekly one-hour slot to deliver the information about the programmes held by the State Government, or move out from the Sultan Abdul Aziz Shah Building which also houses the State Government's administration centre. The Radio Station was given a one-week deadline to adhere to the State Government's request. The Radio Station refused to allocate the weekly one-hour slot as requested. As a result, the Information Minister of Malaysia, Datuk Ahmad Shabery Cheek urged the Radio Station to move out and operate at the Angkasapuri instead, stating that RTM is not afraid of such warning.
