= Negeri FM =

Radio station in Seremban, Negeri Sembilan, Malaysia

Coordinates: 2.6443786°N 101.9848156°E

Seremban; Malaysia
- Broadcast area: Negeri Sembilan
- Frequency: 92.6 FM

Programming
- Language: Malay
- Format: Talk; Contemporary hit radio

Ownership
- Owner: Radio Televisyen Malaysia
- Sister stations: National: Ai FM; Asyik FM; Minnal FM; Nasional FM; Radio Klasik; TraXX FM; Regional: Perlis FM; Kedah FM; Langkawi FM; Mutiara FM; Perak FM; Kelantan FM; Terengganu FM; Pahang FM; Selangor FM; KL FM; Melaka FM; Johor FM; Sarawak FM; Red FM; Wai FM Iban; Wai FM Bidayuh; Sri Aman FM; Sibu FM; Bintulu FM; Miri FM; Limbang FM; Labuan FM; Sabah FM; Sabah V FM; Keningau FM; Sandakan FM; Tawau FM

History
- First air date: 16 August 1990; 35 years ago

Links
- Webcast: rtmklik.rtm.gov.my/radio/negeri/negeri-fm
- Website: negerifm.rtm.gov.my

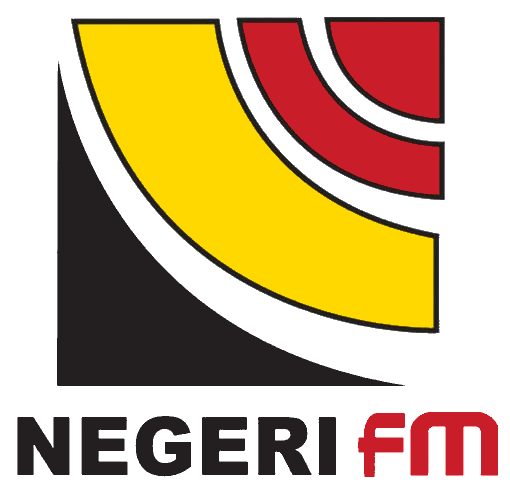
Negeri FM logo (2005–2021)

Negeri FM (translated as State FM, stylised as NEGERI fm) is a Malay language-radio station broadcasting from Seremban, Negeri Sembilan, Malaysia which is operated by the Radio Televisyen Malaysia (RTM). Negeri FM has been in operation since 1990. The Station provides news, plays Western music, other entertainment, and religious programmes. The Station covers the areas of Negeri Sembilan in Malaysia. Negeri FM is transmitted in both standard and Negeri Sembilan Malay.

Negeri FM was launched by Information Minister, Datuk Mohamed Rahmat, on 16 August 1990.

== Frequency ==
Frequencies	Broadcast	Transmitter
92.6 MHz	Seremban	Mount Telapak Buruk
95.7 MHz	Tampin, Negeri Sembilan and Alor Gajah, Malacca	Mount Tampin
107.7MHz	Port Dickson, Gemas, Gemencheh and eastern Negeri Sembilan	Mount Ledang
