= KL FM =

- Kuala Lumpur; Malaysia
- Broadcast area: Kuala Lumpur
- Frequency: 97.2 MHz

Programming
- Format: Talk; Top 40 (CHR)

Ownership
- Owner: Radio Televisyen Malaysia
- Sister stations: National: Ai FM; Asyik FM; Minnal FM; Nasional FM; Radio Klasik; TraXX FM; Regional: Perlis FM; Kedah FM; Langkawi FM; Mutiara FM; Perak FM; Kelantan FM; Terengganu FM; Pahang FM; Selangor FM; Negeri FM; Melaka FM; Johor FM; Sarawak FM; Red FM; Wai FM Iban; Wai FM Bidayuh; Sri Aman FM; Sibu FM; Bintulu FM; Miri FM; Limbang FM; Labuan FM; Sabah FM; Sabah V FM; Keningau FM; Sandakan FM; Tawau FM

History
- First air date: 5 November 1973; 52 years ago
- Former names: Radio Malaysia Ibu Kota, Radio 3 Kuala Lumpur, Radio Malaysia Kuala Lumpur

Links
- Webcast: rtmklik.rtm.gov.my/radio/negeri/kl-fm
- Website: klfm.rtm.gov.my

KL FM is a Malay language-regional radio station operated by Radio Televisyen Malaysia. It is located in the International Broadcasting Centre, Angkasapuri.

== History ==
As Radio Malaysia Ibukota, in 1985, RMIK aired 15-minute Japanese lessons under the title "Moshi Moshi", hosted by deejay Mohamed Nor Mohamed Amin, known as Noramin. He previously worked with Radio Japan. Airing weekdays at 5:30 pm, the lessons would start by playing a Japanese song, followed by asking listeners to start their calls with the "Moshi Moshi" greeting. The show received positive reception by listeners and the press.

As Radio Malaysia Kuala Lumpur (RMKL), in 2001, Zullastree Muhammad joined RMKL after three audition attempts. His first stint was for the 3 am shift, then for the midnight shift and eventually for various segments in the daytime. By this point, RMKL already had 24 hour broadcasting. Zullastree eventually became the longest serving KL FM announcer.

On 26 December 2004, RMKL became the first RTM outlet to provide continuous coverage on the 2004 Aceh tsunami at 12:15 am.
