= MYTV Broadcasting =

Malaysian digital terrestrial television provider company

MYTV Broadcasting Sdn Bhd
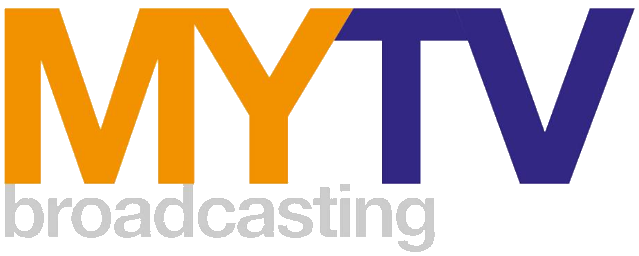
- Type: Private
- Industry: Broadcasting; Digital terrestrial television
- Founded: 17 April 2002; 24 years ago
- Headquarters: Cyberjaya, Selangor, Malaysia
- Area served: Malaysia
- Key people: Azlina Mohd Yusuf (COO)
- Products: Digital terrestrial broadcast; Free-to-view television broadcasting
- Owner: Altel Holdings
- Website: www.mytvbroadcasting.my MYTV Mana Mana (online streaming)

Logo of myFreeview

MYTV Broadcasting Sdn Bhd (MYTV) is a Malaysian television broadcasting company based in Cyberjaya, Selangor. It provides free digital terrestrial television (DTT) in the country, considered first of its kind. The DTT service is officially branded as myFreeview since August 2015, though the legal name of the company remained unchanged. A billion MYR deal has been signed with Telekom Malaysia to distribute the services.

== History ==
Taiwanese company Allion Labs, Inc. has been awarded accreditation from the Standards and Industrial Research Institute of Malaysia (SIRIM) to become the first lab facility for digital television in Malaysia. Around 30 channels have been set to broadcast in the first stage. HbbTV services are also integrated into MYTV service with the usage of Sofia Digital's HbbTV technology. East Coast Peninsular Malaysia has been chosen as the first site for testing, followed by East Malaysia, and northern and southern Peninsular Malaysia before reaching Klang Valley. According to MYTV, the initial annual rental fee for a 24-hour free-to-air TV channel was RM12 million for an SDTV channel and RM25 million for an HDTV channel. However, following reports of Media Prima might quit free-to-air transmission due to unviable fees, MYTV may introduce bandwidth based charging, which is already in consideration. On a statement given by MYTV CEO, Michael Chan announced that transmission fees will be waived until June 2018, when Malaysia completes DTT migration by terminating analogue transmission. Rebates will be also given on a case-by-case basis for six months up to the end of 2018. He is also looking to bring the transmission fee down to between RM8 million and RM18 million, since the Malaysian TV market do not accept fees of RM12 million or RM25 million per channel.

=== Distribution ===
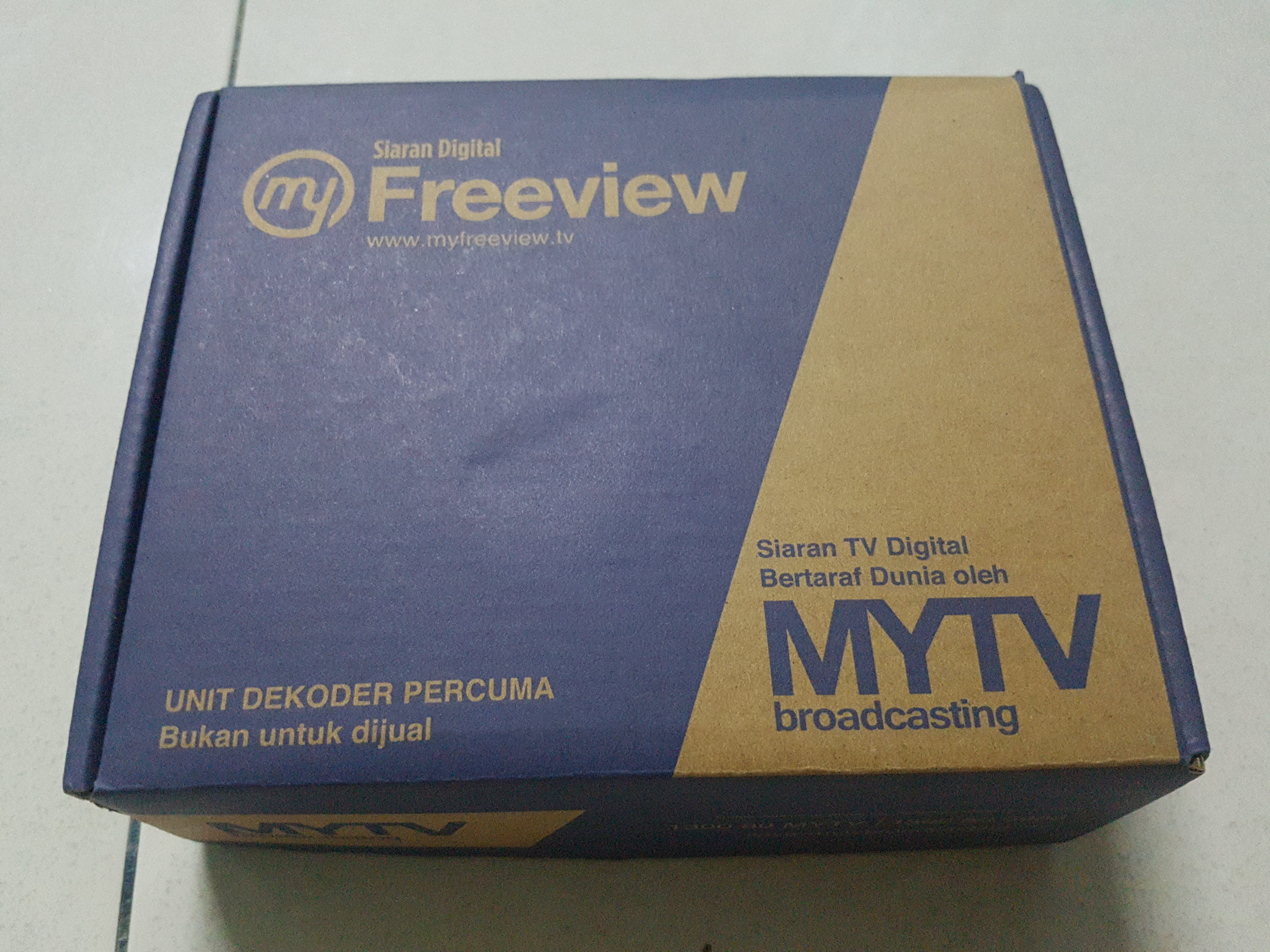
The Malaysian government provided free decoder unit for low-income households

According to former Malaysian Communication and Multimedia Minister Ahmad Shabery Cheek, the MYTV Basic decoder was initially distributed to around two million Malaysian households. All 2 million households had now been determined and it would be sent to recipients house via PosLaju. MYTV has signed an agreement with Pensonic to distribute MYTV Advance set top box exclusively on 29 November 2016. Digital televisions with "DTTV Malaysia" certification can also be used to receive transmission. While households that are not listed as recipients of government aid can purchased the certified DVB-T2 decoders or Integrated Digital TV (IDTV) from local distributor. It can also be found from online e-commerce platform such as Lazada and Shopee. Based on the information provided by myFreeview, 34 transmission sites are utilized to cover around 95% of Malaysian population via outdoor antenna. there are 13 test phase sites

== Channel list ==
There are currently 14 television channels and 11 radio channels listed on MYTV, as approved by Ministry of Communications and Telekom Malaysia Berhad (TM).

=== Television channels ===
Channel No.	Channel Name	Channel Owner	MYTV Mana Mana
101_{HD}	TV1	Radio Televisyen Malaysia	Yes
102_{HD}	TV2	Radio Televisyen Malaysia	Yes
103_{HD}	TV3	Media Prima	No
104_{HD}	Hankuk TV	My Hankuk TV Sdn Bhd	No
107	DidikTV KPM	Media Prima; Ministry of Education Malaysia	No
108	8TV	Media Prima	No
109	TV9	Media Prima	No
110_{HD}	TV Okey	Radio Televisyen Malaysia	Yes
111_{HD}	Sukan+	Radio Televisyen Malaysia	Yes
114_{HD}	TV Alhijrah	Alhijrah Media Corporation	Yes
121_{HD}	Bernama TV	Bernama	Yes
122_{HD}	TVS	Sarawak Media Group (SMG)	Yes
123_{HD}	Berita RTM	Radio Televisyen Malaysia	Yes
200_{HD}	SIARA TV	MYTV Broadcasting Sdn Bhd	Yes

=== Radio channels ===
Channel No.	Channel Name	Channel Owner	MYTV Mana Mana
701	Nasional FM	Radio Televisyen Malaysia	Yes
702	TraXX FM	Radio Televisyen Malaysia	Yes
703	Minnal FM	Radio Televisyen Malaysia	Yes
704	Ai FM	Radio Televisyen Malaysia	Yes
705	Radio Klasik	Radio Televisyen Malaysia	Yes
706	Asyik FM	Radio Televisyen Malaysia	Yes
707	Sabah FM	Radio Televisyen Malaysia	Yes
708	Sabah V FM	Radio Televisyen Malaysia	Yes
709	Sarawak FM	Radio Televisyen Malaysia	Yes
710	Wai FM	Radio Televisyen Malaysia	Yes
711	Bernama Radio	Bernama	Yes

== MYTV Mana Mana ==
=== Television ===
Channel name	Channel owner	MYTV Mana-Mana
TV IKIM	Institute of Islamic Understanding Malaysia	Yes
Arirang TV	Korea International Broadcasting Foundation	Yes
Selangor TV	Media Selangor Sdn Bhd	Yes
CNA	Mediacorp	Yes
RT (Russia Today)	ANO "TV-Novosti"	Yes
Al Jazeera Arabic	Al Jazeera Media Network	Yes
Al Jazeera English	Al Jazeera Media Network	Yes
DW English	Deutsche Welle	Yes
TaiwanPlus	Public Television Service	Yes
Borneo.TV	IB Media Consultant Sdn Bhd	Yes
KCM	KC Global Media Asia	Yes
Rock Entertainment	Rock Entertainment Holdings	Yes
Rock Action	Rock Entertainment Holdings	Yes
ZooMoo	Rock Entertainment Holdings	Yes
Global Trekker	Rock Entertainment Holdings	Yes
SPOTV NOW	Eclat Media Group	Yes
NHK World-Japan	NHK	Yes
Aniplus	Plus Media Networks Asia	Yes
Euronews	Euronews SA	Yes
Drama Channel	Media Nusantara Citra	Yes
The Indonesia Channel	PT Melia Media International	Yes

=== Radio ===
Channel Name	Channel Owner	MYTV Mana-Mana
988 FM	Star Media Group Berhad	Yes
Suria FM	Star Media Group Berhad	Yes
Best FM	Suara Johor Sdn Bhd	Yes
Rakita	Radio Kita Sdn Bhd	Yes
Hot FM	Media Prima Berhad	Yes
Fly FM	Media Prima Berhad	Yes
Molek FM	Media Prima Berhad	Yes
Eight FM	Media Prima Berhad	Yes
Kool FM	Media Prima Berhad	Yes
Manis FM	Husa Network Sdn Bhd	Yes

== Former channels ==
=== TV ===
- TVRI Nasional (only in MYTV Mana Mana)
- MotoRRacing TV (only in MYTV Mana Mana)
- Astro Go Shop
- Wow Shop (Malay)
- Wow Shop (Chinese)
- Horizon Sports (only in MYTV Mana Mana)
- My Cinema Europe (only in MYTV Mana Mana)
- British Muslim TV (only in MYTV Mana Mana)
- Channel W
- Hao Xiang Shopping Channel
- TVRI World (only in MYTV Mana Mana)
- SEA Today (only in MYTV Mana Mana)
- Awesome TV
- SUKE TV
- TV6
- ONE (only in MYTV Mana Mana)
- Enjoy TV5

== See also ==
- List of television stations in Malaysia
- List of radio stations in Malaysia
