= Bernama Radio =

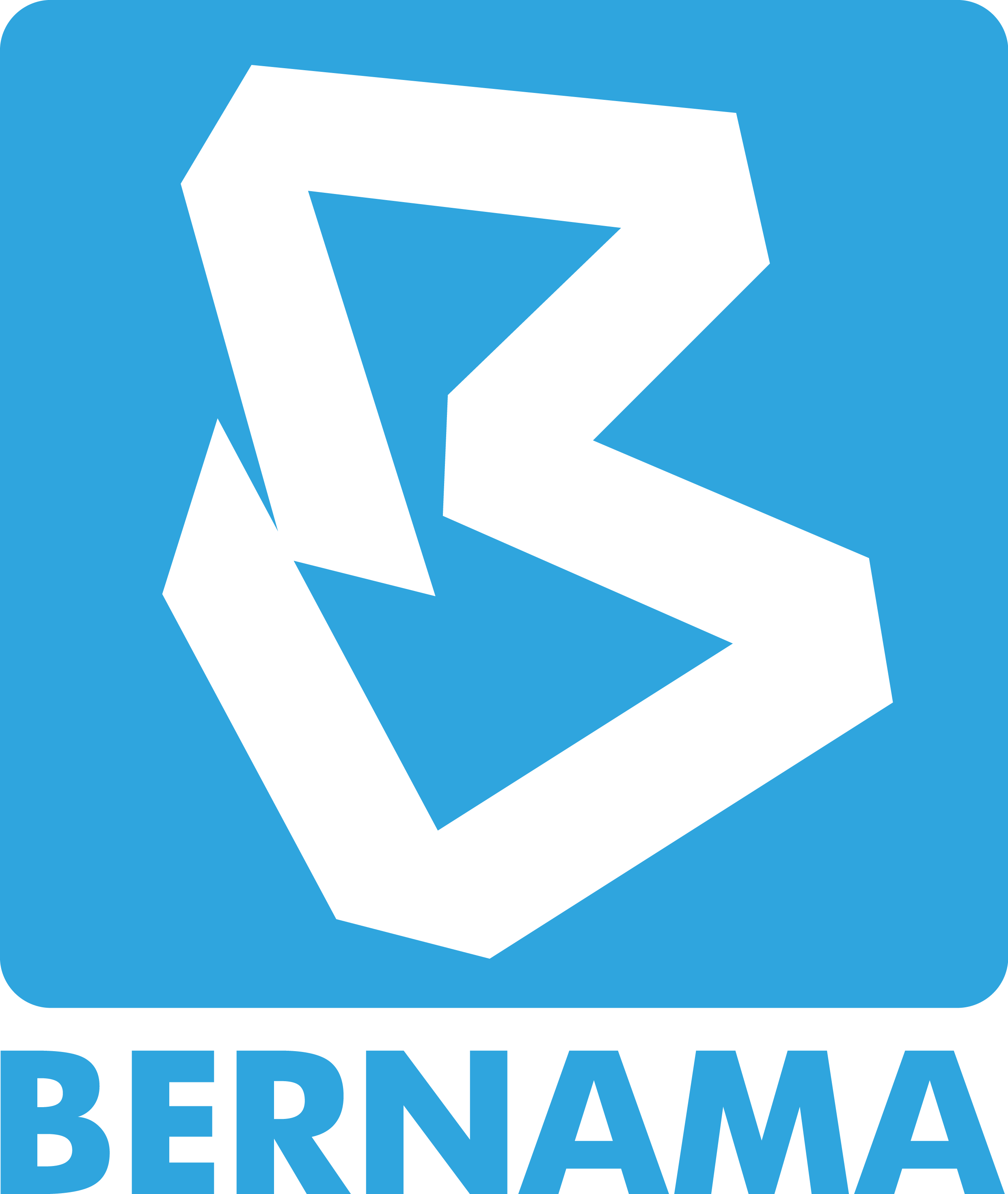

Kuala Lumpur; Malaysia
- Broadcast area: Klang Valley; Kuching; Kota Kinabalu
- RDS: BERNAMA

Programming
- Language: Malay
- Format: All-news radio

Ownership
- Owner: Bernama

History
- First air date: 3 September 2007; 18 years ago
- Former names: Radio24 (2007–2016)

Links
- Website: www.bernama.com/radio

Bernama Radio (formerly known as Radio24 or BERNAMA Radio24 from 2007 until 2016) is the first all-news radio station in Malaysia, owned and operated by Bernama, the news agency of the Government of Malaysia.

== History ==
The old Radio24 logo before the rebranding exercise

The free-to-air station began trial transmission on 2007 at noon and was officially launched on 3 September 2007 at 9:00 a.m. It broadcasts on the FM 93.9 MHz frequency in the Klang Valley that was formerly used by RTM's Klasik Nasional FM.

The station broadcasts domestic, regional and world news through hourly news bulletins, quarter-hourly news highlights and breaking news as and when they happen through live field reports and telephone cross-overs. The station also has an array of talk-back shows. It also airs at frequent intervals, traffic, weather and stock market reports. The station also provides live audio streaming through its website. On 3 January 2011, the station began its Mobile Streaming service via smartphones, accessible through devices' on board web browsers.

The station underwent a minor rebrand in March 2016 whereby the station is now known as "Bernama Radio".

Broadcasting in both English and Malay, the station is owned and operated by the news agency, and broadcasts from Wisma Bernama in Kuala Lumpur. For its first phase, the station's transmission covered the Klang Valley, which is home to approximately eight million people.

Tamil language broadcasting was introduced on 4 February 2017. The slot, known as "Tamil Oli", is broadcast from 11a.m. to 1p.m. and from 11p.m. to midnight every Saturday and Sunday respectively. It is created in collaboration with New Wave Events Sdn Bhd and will be based on an infotainment concept. The introduction of such slots also means that Tamil language radio broadcasts will be launched in East Malaysia for the first time, since other Tamil radio stations available in Malaysia only broadcast in Peninsular Malaysia.

== Availability ==
=== Radio ===
| Frequencies | Area | Transmitter | Note |
|---|---|---|---|
| 93.9 MHz | Klang Valley | Kuala Lumpur Tower | This frequency was formerly used by RTM's Klasik Nasional FM (now Radio Klasik). |
| 100.9 MHz | Kuching, Sarawak | Bukit Antu | |
| 107.9 MHz | Kota Kinabalu, Sabah | Bukit Karatong | |

=== Television ===
| TV Platform | Channel |
|---|---|
| MYTV | 711 |

== See also ==
- List of radio stations in Malaysia
