= Biji-Biji Initiative =

- Biji-biji Initiative logo
- Product type: Upcycling, art installation, educational workshops
- Current owner: Rashvin Pal Singh, Gurpreet Singh, Zoe Victoria
- Country: Malaysia
- Tagline: "We make things"

Biji-Biji Initiative is a Malaysian an environmental based social enterprise company that provides a range of up-cycling and art installation services. Biji-biji Initiative activities are in the fields of

- green technology
- sustainability consultancy
- design & fabrication
- ethical fashion
- skills education

Currently its operations are based at two open workshops in Jalan Ipoh, Kuala Lumpur and a factory in Klang, Selangor.

== Background ==
Biji-Biji Initiative was formed in December 2012, beginning by tackling environmental issues through up-cycling and repurposing waste into gifts and products. Biji-Biji opened their first Open Workshop in Jalan Sungkai, off Jalan Ipoh in 2013. The main activities done is woodworking and metalworking. Later in 2015, a second Open Workshop was opened at Jalan Nangka, off Jalan Ipoh. The main activities in this workshop are electronics, stitching and tailoring. Besides that, Biji-Biji also practices open source ideas, which is idea and information sharing. Biji-Biji will be basing its operations from a public friendly maker-space from May 2017 in Publika, Kuala Lumpur.

== Collaborations ==
Collaborations with Biji-Biji
Collaborations	More information
Ecoworld	Property developer Eco World Development Group Berhad (Ecoworld) collaborated with Biji-Biji to organise the Ecofestival at Ecoworld's Eco Sky project site in Jalan Ipoh, to spread awareness on “upcycling” through various art installations in the hope to shed light on upcycling as a way to create a positive difference for the environment.
CIS Network	
Urbanscapes	1Malaysia for Youth (iM4U), with the help of Biji-Biji and Do Something Good, kickstarted the iM4U Green Team at Urbanscapes 2013 in the Malaysia Agro Exposition Park Serdang. Biji-Biji also collaborated with other international and local artists to produce the art installation at Urbanscapes 2014.
Publika	Biji-Biji and other local artists collaborated for the Publika Lantern Installation, which uses recycled water cooler bottles controlled by electronics, as to celebrate Chinese New Year in Publika Boulevard, Kuala Lumpur.
Art For Grabs	Biji-Biji took part in the KL Art For Grabs Festival 2015, by showcasing their retail bags made from rejected seat belts.
Ministry of Youth and Sports	Biji-Biji collaborated with the Ministry of Youth and Sports in becoming one of the mentors under the newly revamped 'Rakan Muda' programme - a programme to develop the youths of Malaysia.
Pernod Ricard	Biji-Biji collaborated with Pernod Ricard Malaysia in producing Brightboxes to be donated to Yayasan Nanyang for the April 2015 Nepal earthquake victims.
Yayasan Inovasi Malaysia	Yayasan Inovasi Malaysia collaborated with various parties, including Biji-Biji in creating a platform called ‘Donate Your Idea’.
