= 106.0 FM =

FM radio frequency

This is a list of radio stations that broadcast on FM frequency 106.0 MHz:

== Germany ==
- Baden FM

== France ==
- NRJ

== Greece ==
- Zita FM

== Indonesia ==
- 106.0 Nikoya FM
- Radio Hang FM (Batam & Singapore)

== Malaysia ==
- City Plus FM (Seremban frequency)

== Turkey ==
- Alanya FM Radyo

== United Arab Emirates ==
- Radio 2 (Abu Dhabi frequency)

== United Kingdom ==
- Nation Radio South Coast in the Isle of Wight
- Greatest Hits Radio East Midlands in the East Midlands
- Heart North and Mid Wales in Newtown
- Heart South Wales in Swansea and Carmarthen
- KMFM Canterbury
- Q Radio Mid-Ulster in Cookstown
- Radio Wester Ross in Gairloch
