= Martin Looi =

Malaysian musician

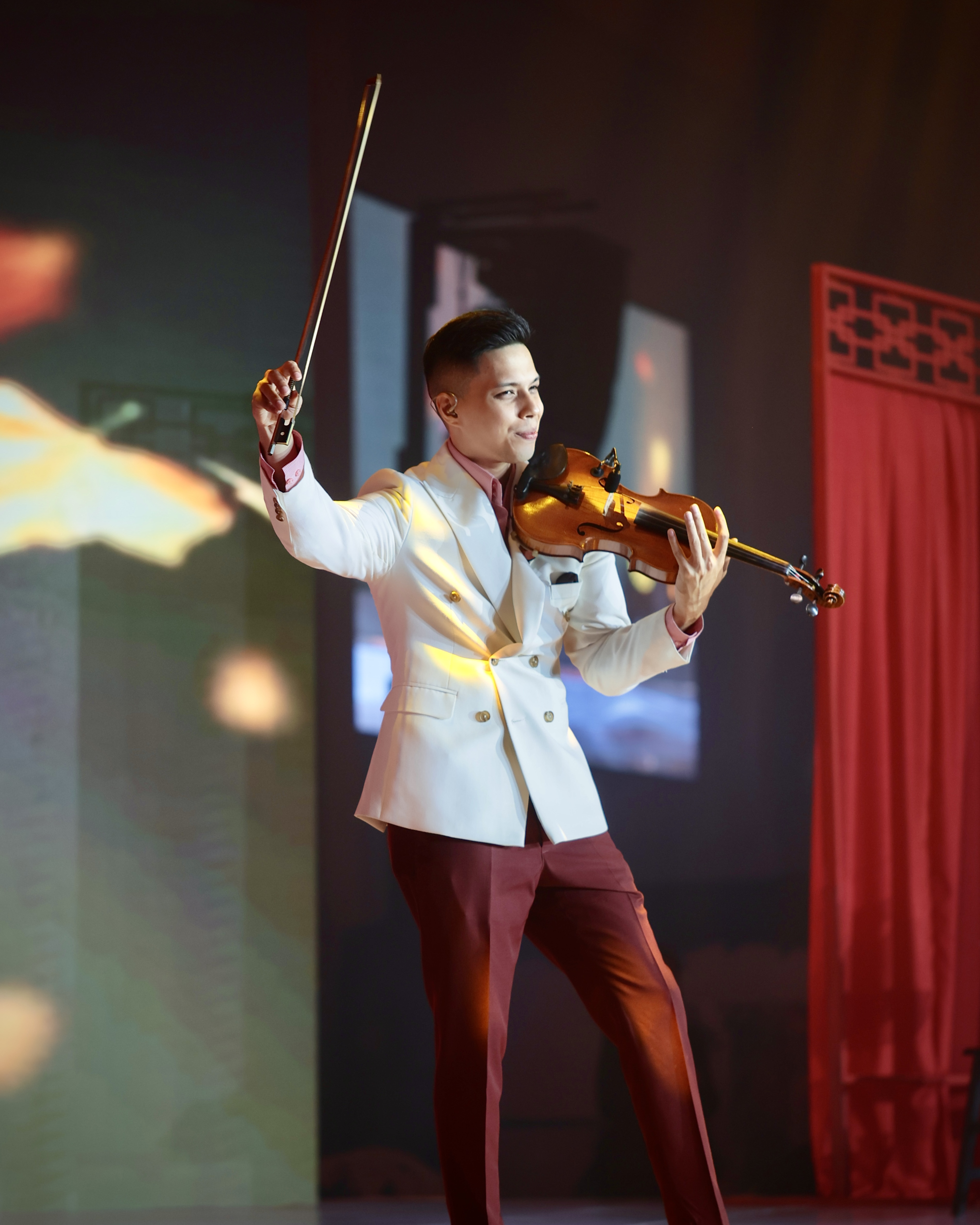

Martin Looi (born December 19, 1998) is a contemporary Malaysian violinist, composer, and music producer. He has cut an EP and two albums and is noted for a live performance he did from atop the KL Tower.

His music expands beyond traditional classical boundaries, blending classical violin technique with modern genres like hip-hop, R&B, pop, and electronic music.

== Early life and career ==
Born in Melaka, Looi began his classical violin training at the age of five, developing a strong foundation in the traditional repertoire.

He later pursued higher education in audio engineering, graduating with a degree from the Australian Institute of Music. This technical background heavily influenced his transition from a pure instrumentalist to a modern music producer capable of shaping his own unique sonic landscapes.

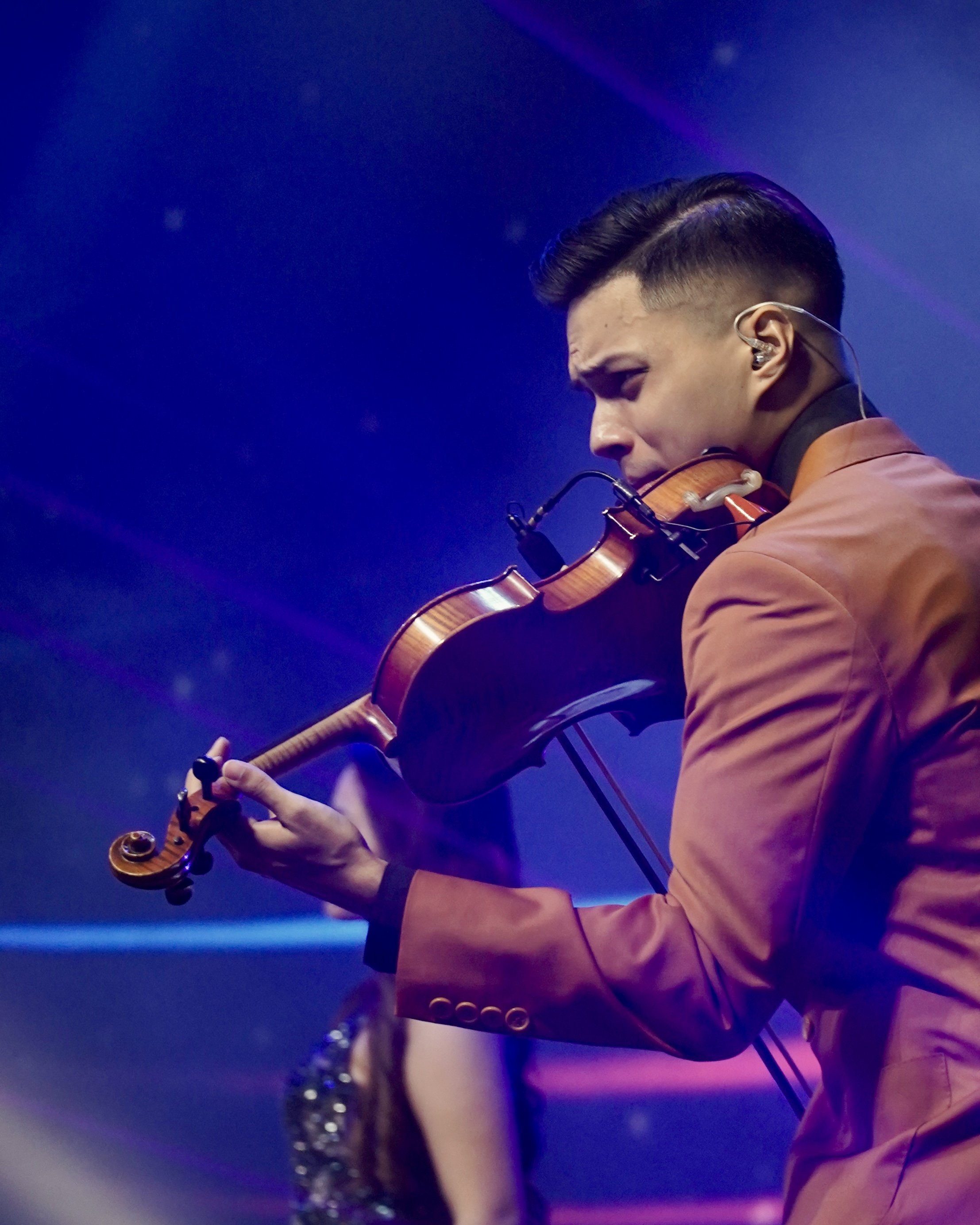

Looi's discography is defined by genre-fluid experimentation, frequently created in close collaboration with his sister and co-producer, Lav Looi. He debuted with the EP Maddy in 2022, followed by his first full-length exploration of hybrid styles, Sugary, in 2023.

In August 2024, Looi secured a spot in the Malaysia Book of Records for performing the "Highest Altitude Facebook Live Broadcasting Violin Performance." He performed the Malaysian national anthem Negaraku 300 meters above ground atop the KL Tower.

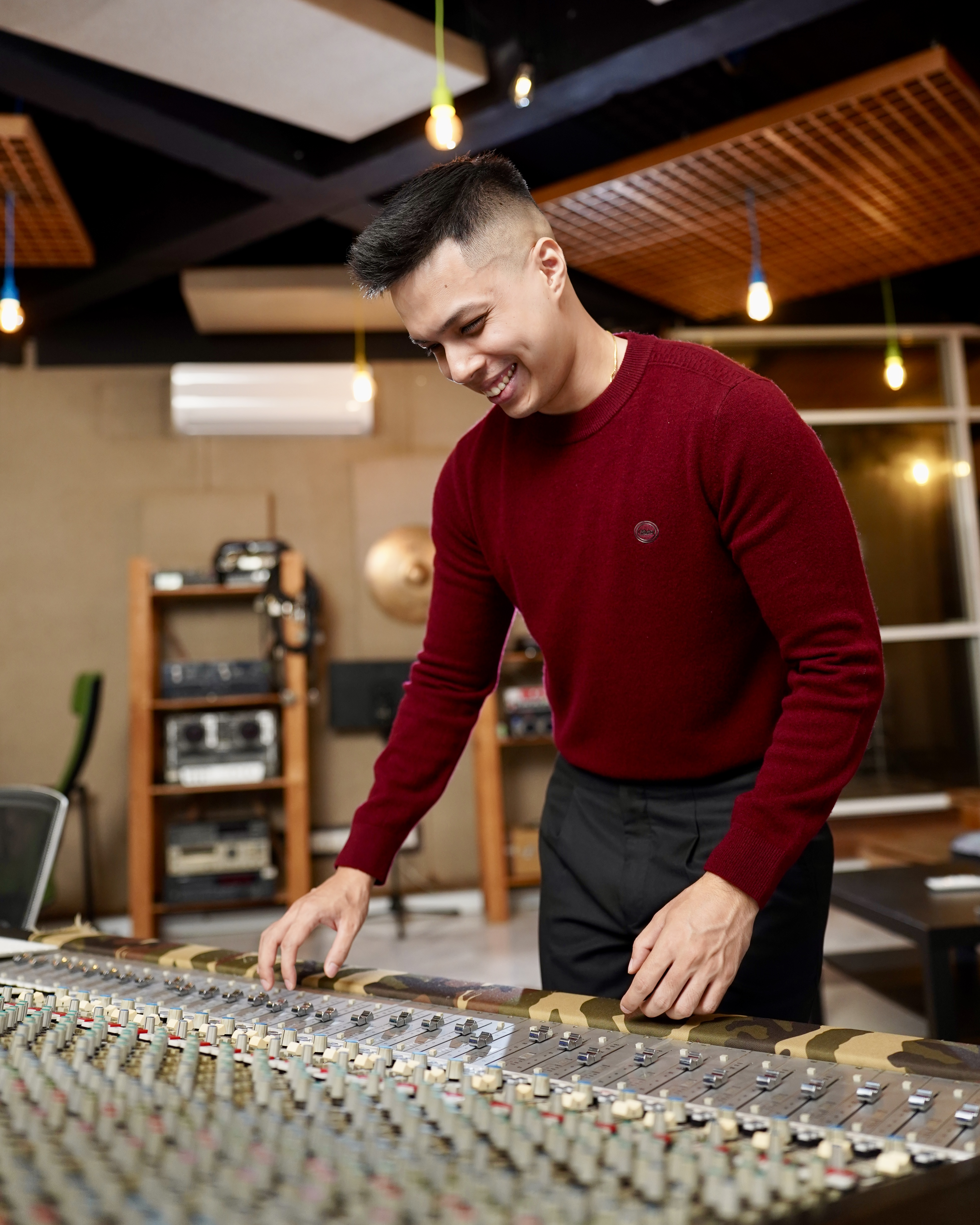

That year, Looi also released a Christmas album with his sister called Wrapped In Harmony.

In March 2026, Looi released Velvet Alibi, an eight-track cinematic, dark-pop instrumental album.

The project which features dramatic reinterpretations of iconic tracks alongside original compositions garnered international acclaim, earning a silver medal at the Global Music Awards in April 2026.

Known for bridging the gap between classical instrumentation and mainstream Malaysian pop culture, Looi has collaborated and shared stages with prominent local artists, including hip-hop icon Joe Flizzow, Marsha Milan, and vocal powerhouse Jaclyn Victor.
