= Kuala Lumpur Tower =

Telecommunication tower in Malaysia

- Malay: Menara Kuala Lumpur
- Official wordmark

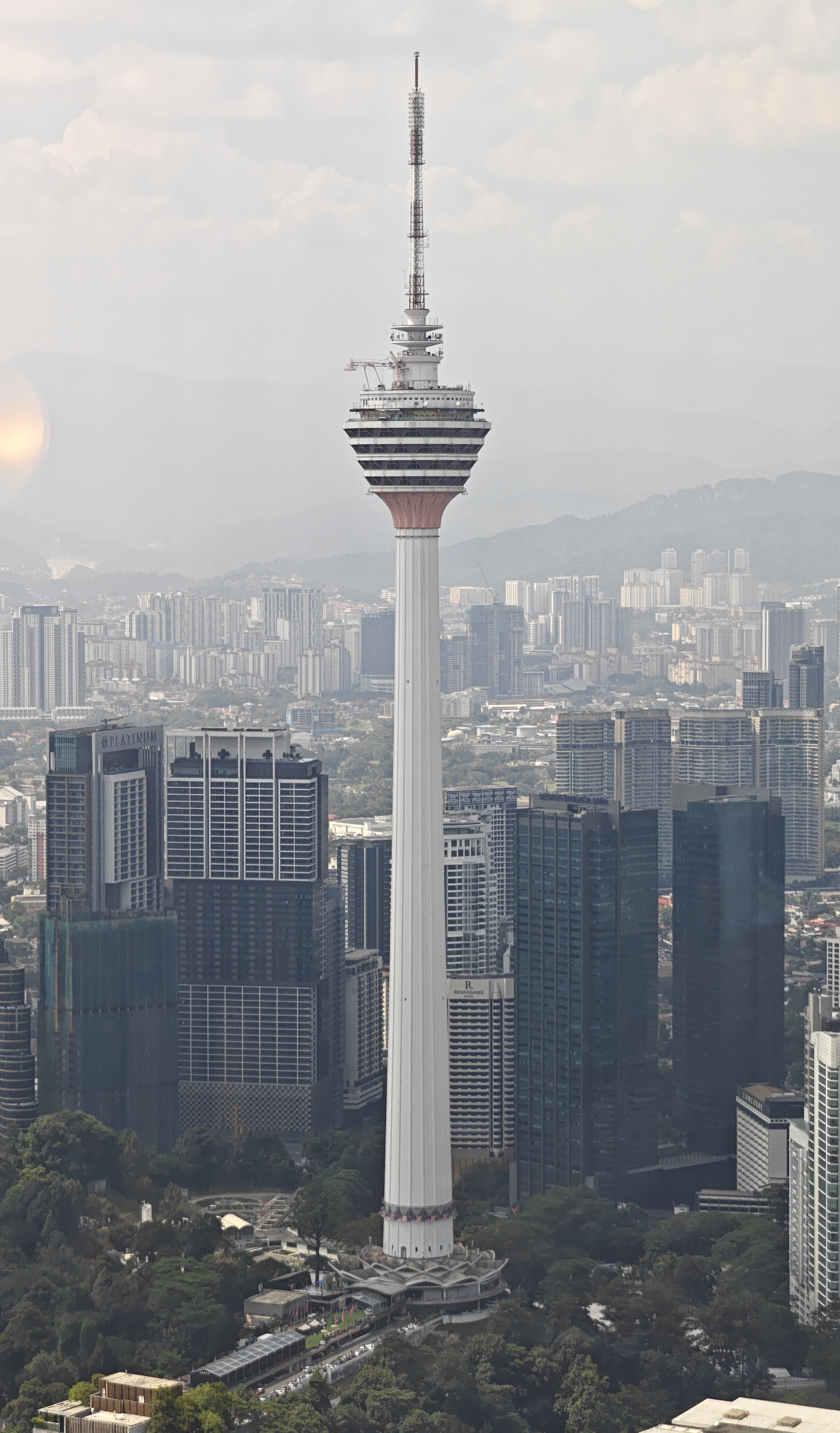
- Kuala Lumpur Tower taken from Merdeka 118 in August 2025
- Interactive map of the Kuala Lumpur Tower area
- Alternative names: KL Tower

General information
- Status: Completed
- Type: Telecommunication, Islamic Lunar observatory, adventure (basejump), tourism, cultural
- Location: Bukit Nanas, Kuala Lumpur, Malaysia
- Groundbreaking: 1 October 1991; 34 years ago
- Construction started: 4 October 1991; 34 years ago
- Completed: 13 September 1994; 31 years ago
- Opening: 23 July 1996; 30 years ago
- Inaugurated: 1 October 1996; 29 years ago
- Renovated: 1 January 2012 − 31 December 2015

Height
- Antenna spire: 421 m (1,381 ft)
- Roof: 336.5 m (1,104 ft)
- Top floor: 282 m (925 ft)
- Observatory: 276 m (906 ft)

Technical details
- Floor count: 6
- Floor area: 7,700 m^{2} (82,882 sq ft)
- Lifts/elevators: 4

Design and construction
- Architect: Ir. Achmad Moerdijat (Kumpulan Senireka Sdn. Bhd.)
- Main contractor: Hazama Corporation

Website
- www.menarakl.com.my

The Kuala Lumpur Tower (Malay: Menara Kuala Lumpur; Jawi: منارا کوالا لومڤور), colloquially referred to as KL Tower, is a 421-meter-tall (1,381-foot) telecommunication tower in Kuala Lumpur, Malaysia. It is the world's seventh-tallest telecommunication tower. It features an antenna which increases its height to 421 metres (1,381 ft). The roof of the pod is at 336.5 metres (1,104 ft). The rest of the tower below has a stairwell and an elevator to reach the upper area, which also contains a revolving restaurant, providing diners with a panoramic view of the city.

Races are held annually, where participants race up the stairs to the top. The tower also acts as the Islamic falak observatory to observe the crescent moon which marks the beginning of Muslim month of Ramadhan, Syawal, and Zulhijjah, to celebrate fasting month of Ramadhan, Hari Raya Aidilfitri and Aidiladha. The tower is the highest viewpoint in Kuala Lumpur that is open to the public.

== History ==
The official groundbreaking for the Kuala Lumpur Tower was overseen by Prime Minister Mahathir Mohamad on 1 October 1991. Construction of the tower was a three-phase process.

The first phase was the widening of Jalan Bukit Nanas and the excavation of soil from the construction site. This phase was completed on 1 August 1992.

On 1 July 1992, the second phase began with the construction of the foundation and basement of the tower. Approximately 50,000 cubic metres of concrete were continuously poured for 31 hours, thus setting a record in the Malaysian construction industry. The foundation work, requiring no piling, was completed on 1 April 1993.

The third phase was the construction of the 'superstructure' which began in May 1994. The construction of the tower started with the erection of the tower shaft, then the tower head. As the finishing touches to the tower head were applied, the construction of the touristic building began.

The main lobby of the upper ground floor is decorated with exquisite glass-clad domes that sparkle like giant diamonds. These domes were designed and arranged in the form of the Muqarnas by Iranian craftsmen from Isfahan.

On 13 September 1994, Mahathir performed the 'topping-out ceremony' where the antenna mast was installed, thus marking the final height of the tower, 421 metres above the ground. After installation of facilities and amenities, Menara Kuala Lumpur was opened to public on 23 July 1996, and it was the tallest structure in Malaysia at the time of its completion, and 3 years later, it was surpassed by Petronas Twin Towers as the tallest structure in the country.

Menara Kuala Lumpur was officially inaugurated by Mahathir on 1 October 1996 at 20:30 MST. Among the distinguished guests were the Yang di-Pertuan Agong Tuanku Jaafar ibni Almarhum Tuanku Abdul Rahman, Raja Permaisuri Agong Tuanku Najihah, the wives of the Sultan of Brunei, Queen Saleha and Princess Hajah Mariam Binti Abdul Aziz.

== Ownership and management ==
The Kuala Lumpur Tower itself is owned by the Government of Malaysia, but since its opening in 1996, it has been operated and maintained under a concession to Menara Kuala Lumpur Sdn Bhd, a subsidiary of the state-controlled telecommunications company, Telekom Malaysia. The contract for this was last renewed for a 10-year period in 2011. In 2019, Menara Kuala Lumpur Sdn Bhd reported a net profit of RM20.9 million on revenue of RM65.6 million.

In December 2022, it was reported that the concession had been transferred for RM3.9 million to privately owned Hydroshoppe Sdn Bhd, on 31 October 2022. Little is known about Hydroshoppe's ownership, but it is believed to be a shell company, with paid-up capital of only RM1 million, and its two publicly declared directors being secretaries from business consultants Azam Corporate Services.

Telekom Malaysia said in a statement that they decided not to renew the concession in October 2021, "due to the change in the business nature of [Menara Kuala Lumpur], from telecommunications to hospitality". They added that "the selection process of the new concessionaire was [then] taken up by the Government" (then controlled by a Barisan Nasional-Perikatan Nasional coalition, headed by Prime Minister Ismail Sabri Yaakob). They stated that all current employees would also retain their jobs for three years following the transition.

According to Minister of Communications and Digital, Fahmi Fadzil, Telekom Malaysia is still operating the concession for the tower as of 31 December 2022, under a "third interim period". He has requested an internal briefing from both Telekom Malaysia and the Ministry of Communications and Digital. The Malaysian Anti-Corruption Commission has also announced an investigation into potential "elements of corruption" regarding this case, with three witnesses called as of 31 December.

== Broadcasting ==
Kuala Lumpur Tower, a member of the World Federation of Great Towers, is utilised by several organisations for various broadcasting purposes. Originally intended only for television broadcasting, radio antennas were included during the construction. The tower now broadcasts free-to-air terrestrial television stations that use the tower's antenna include:

- Television:
  - Radio Televisyen Malaysia
    - TV1 (VHF Channel 5)
    - TV2 (VHF Channel 8)

(Defunct after 30.9.2019 analogue shutdown, replaced by MYTV MUXes)

- Radio:
  - Radio Televisyen Malaysia
    - Radio Klasik FM (87.7 MHz)
    - Nasional FM (88.5 MHz)
    - Ai FM (89.3 MHz)
    - TraXX FM (90.3 MHz)
    - Asyik FM (91.1 MHz)
    - Minnal FM (92.3 MHz)
    - KL FM (97.2 MHz)

Media telecommunications and broadcasting mast. Television stations which are transmitted from the tower includes private (commercial) station, NTV7 a subsidiary of Media Prima Berhad broadcasting through UHF obtained from an antenna by 200 metres.

Malaysia currently employs both analogue broadcasting and all television broadcasting is to be analogue. Kuala Lumpur Tower is not a reliable broadcasting antenna for completely digital broadcasting because the tower is not tall enough to transmit the higher frequency waves needed to areas surrounded by forests or high-rise buildings. As an alternative, a new 421-meter-tall (1,381-foot). To make Kuala Lumpur Tower more appealing to one free-to-air terrestrial commercial broadcasting on Media Prima Berhad who plan to move their transmitting stations to the new tower have drafted a plan to extend its digital broadcasting antenna by 401 to 421 metres. To increase the height of the tower's antenna by 421 metres, the structure itself will have to be lengthened by 200 metres, which would cost approximately RM4 billion. In addition to covering this cost, the company would put RM3.5 billion into refurbishing the transmitting station, offering four times more area to each broadcaster. Current Kuala Lumpur aviation restrictions limit Kuala Lumpur Tower's height, but has stated that the company plans to discuss the matter with related ministries and agencies. If these plans are not realised, however, Kuala Lumpur Tower is expected to stop transmitting television waves with the exception of Media Prima Berhad, who will continue to broadcast through the tower. also pointed out the possibility of the tower depending on what the television broadcasters want or need.

== Channels listed by frequency ==
=== Radio ===
- FM 87.7 MHz – Radio Klasik FM (1 kW)
- FM 88.5 MHz – Nasional FM (1 kW)
- FM 89.3 MHz – Ai FM (1 kW)
- FM 90.3 MHz – TraXX FM (1 kW)
- FM 91.1 MHz – Asyik FM (1 kW)
- FM 92.3 MHz – Minnal FM (1 kW)
- FM 97.2 MHz – KL FM (1 kW)

All services radio broadcast at 8 kW relay of Kuala Lumpur Tower based in Greater Kuala Lumpur (surrounding based in Kuala Lumpur)

=== Television ===
- VHF 5 – TV1 (10 kW/100kWe)
- VHF 8 – TV2 (10 kW/100kWe)

(Closed on 30th September 2019, replaced with MYTV MUXes)

All services television broadcast at 20 kW relay of Kuala Lumpur Tower based in Greater Kuala Lumpur (surrounding based in Kuala Lumpur)

== Facts ==
Comparison of the Kuala Lumpur Tower with the world's seven tallest towers

The KL Tower is the seventh tallest telecommunication tower in the world (after Tokyo Skytree in Japan, the Canton Tower in China, CN Tower in Canada, the Ostankino Tower in Russia, the Oriental Pearl Tower in China, and the Milad Tower in Iran). Built to enhance the quality of telecommunication services and the clarity of broadcasting, KL Tower is a symbol of Kuala Lumpur.

The structure is divided into five basic sections:

1. The foundation base houses three basement floors for safety purposes, storage and maintenance work.
2. The touristic building bears the administration office, souvenir shops and the 146-meter-long (479-foot) pedestrian mall with cascading pools.
3. The tower shaft comprises 22 levels with four elevators and flights of stairs with a total of 2,058 steps.
4. The tower has an estimated volume of 164,000 m^{3} (5,791,605 cu ft)
5. The tower head holds the public observation platform (276 m) and revolving restaurant, as well as the telecommunication and broadcasting stations.
6. The antenna mast crowns the tower and is utilised for telecommunication and broadcasting transmissions.

When constructing the KL Tower, the builders took special care to construct a retaining wall around a 100-year-old jelutong tree (Dyera costulata). The tower was moved at a cost of RM430,000 to avoid harming the monumental tree, which is found near the pedestrian mall.

KL Tower is managed by Menara Kuala Lumpur Sdn. Bhd., a wholly owned subsidiary of the Telekom Malaysia Group.

KL Tower was the first Pit Stop in The Amazing Race Asia 1 and fielded a route marker on the final leg of the same season.

On August 14, 2024, violinist Martin Looi set a national record at KL Tower by performing the national anthem "Negaraku" from the Sky Box at a height of 300 meters.He later returned to perform for the tower's New Year countdown on December 31 that same year.

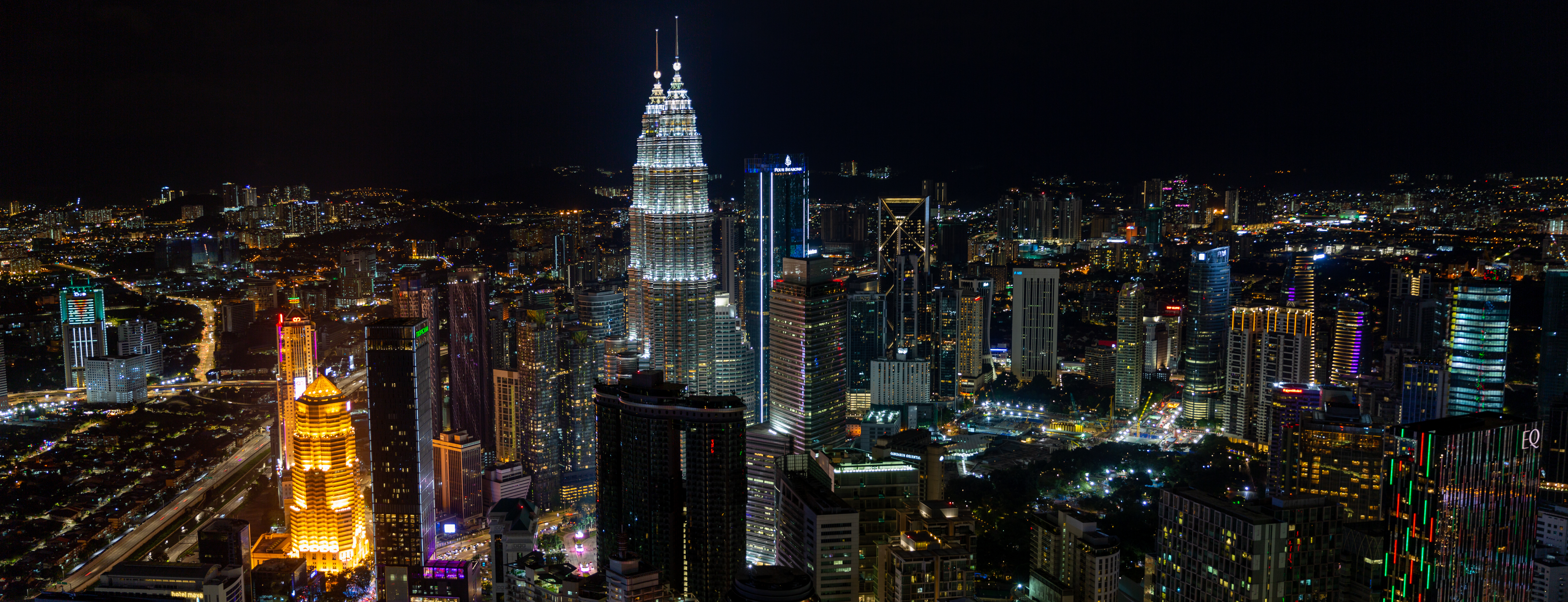
Panorama image taken from observation deck

== Transport ==
The Tower is located on Jalan Puncak, which branches off from Jalan P. Ramlee. Even though they're not very close, the closest rapid transit stations would be Bukit Nanas station and Dang Wangi LRT station. The tower also has outdoor parking for cars and bus.

== Tourism ==
Tourists visit KL Tower to have a 360-degree view of the city. The lift takes only 54 seconds going up to the observation deck and takes 52 seconds to come down.

== Gallery ==
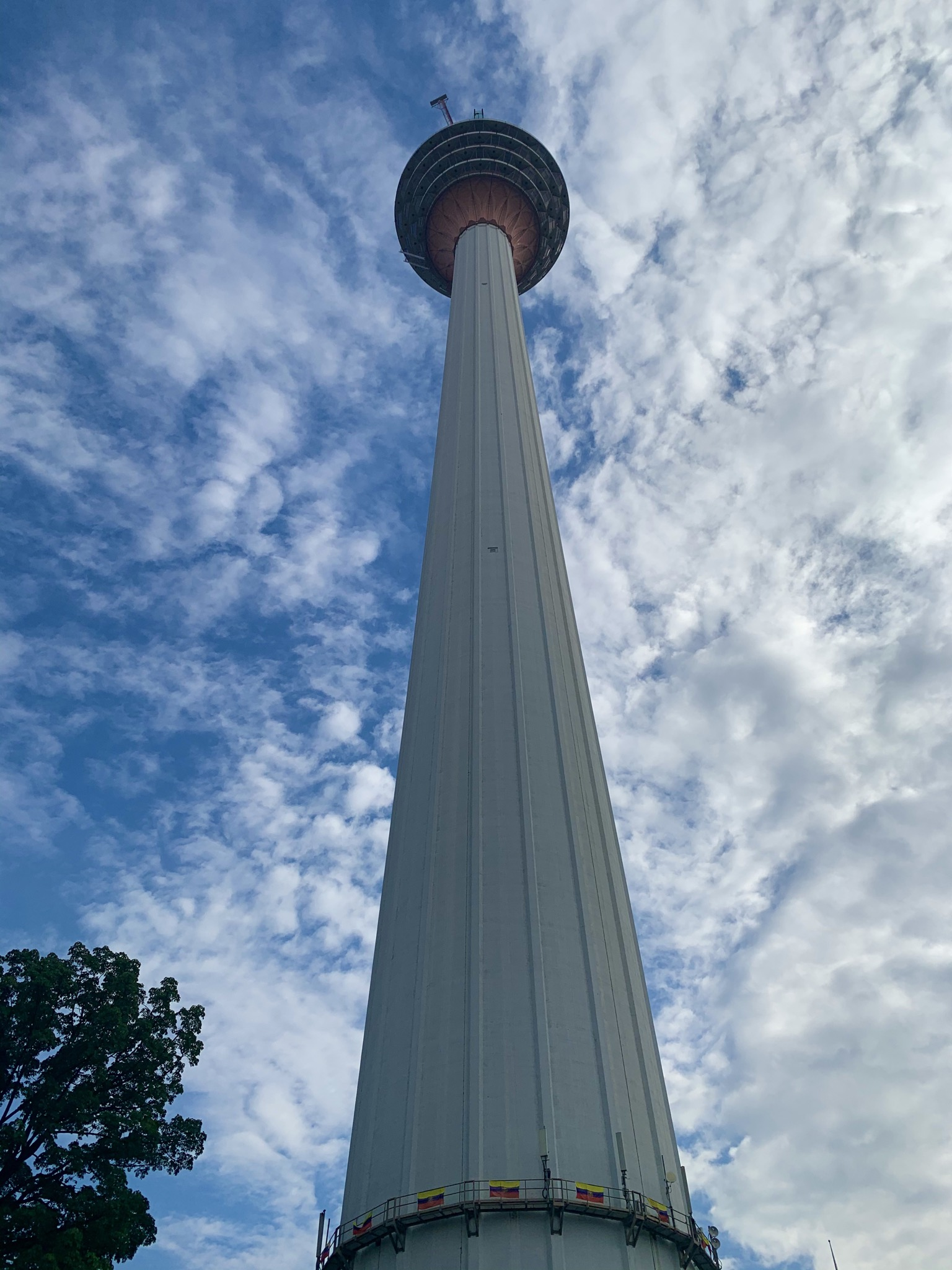
KL Tower as seen from below

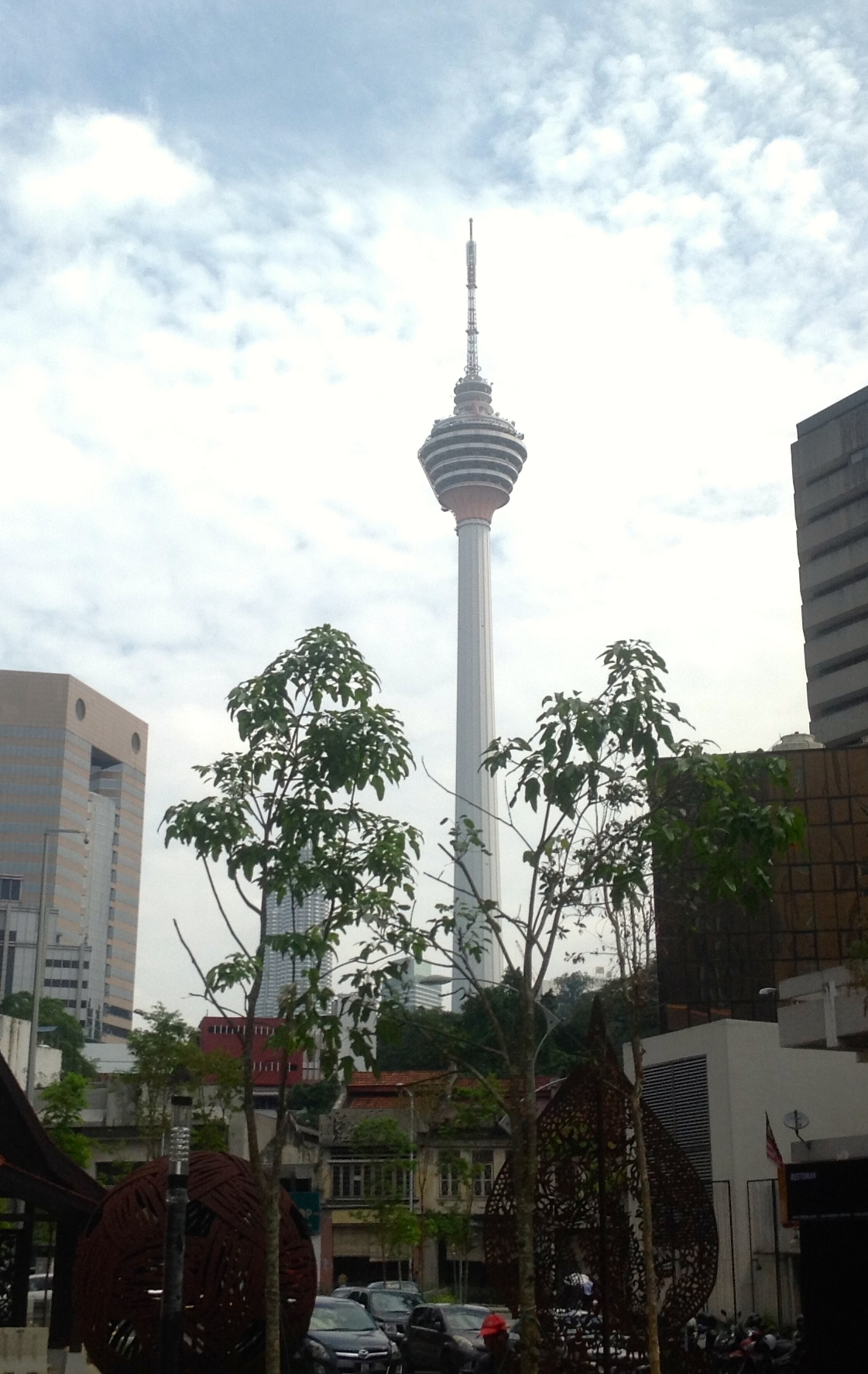
Kuala Lumpur tower in KL Malaysia

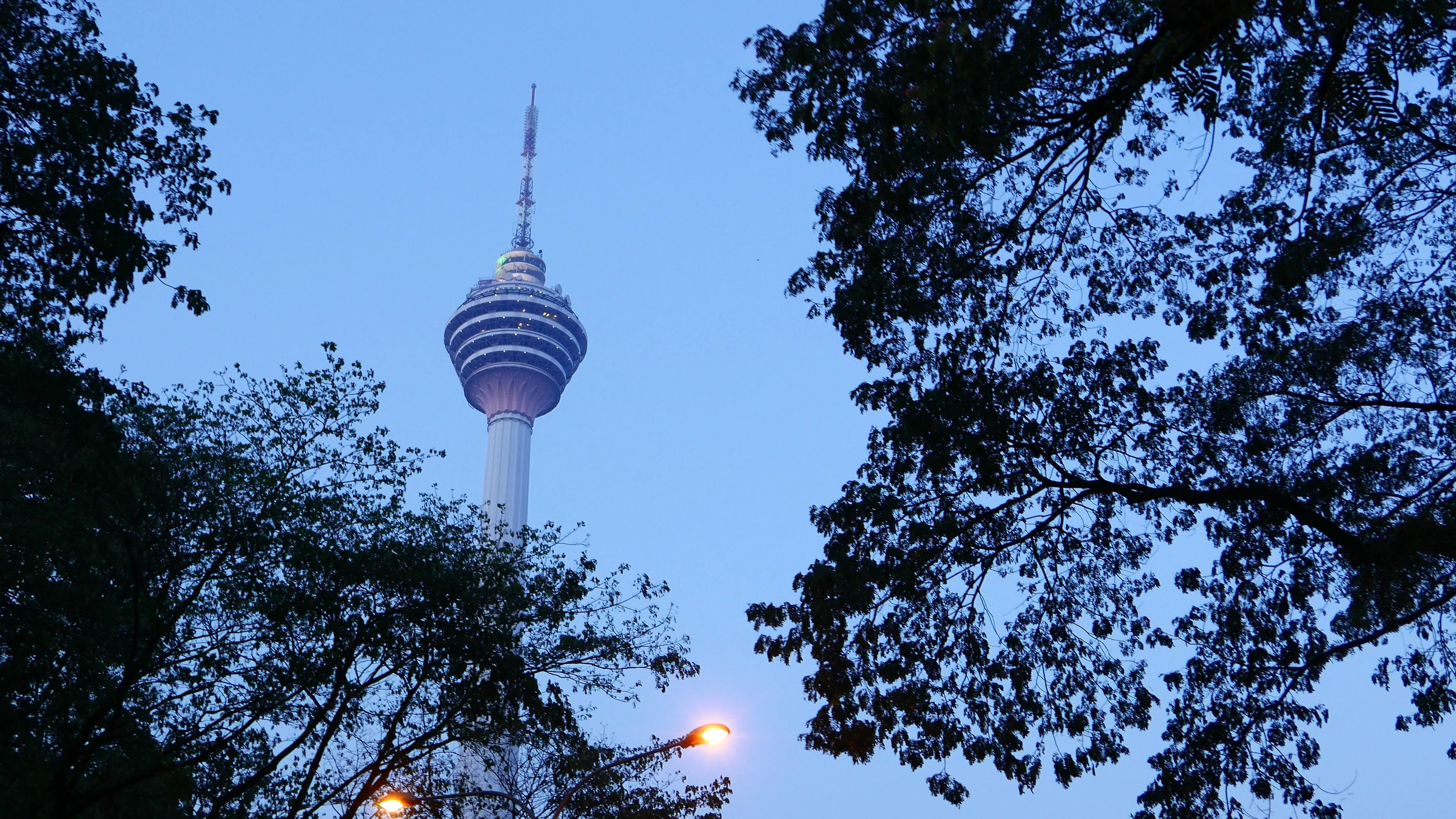
KL Tower Head in Dusk

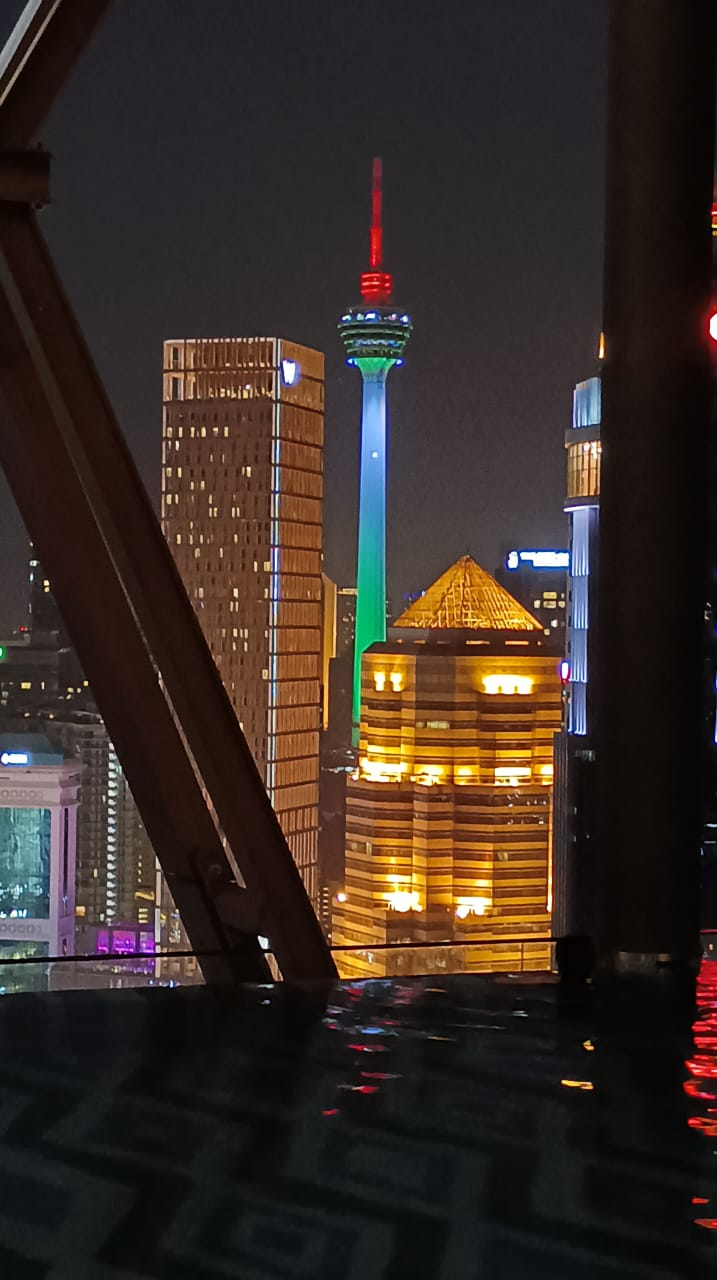
KL Tower illuminates in the color's of the Flag of Palestine viewed from Scarletz Suites

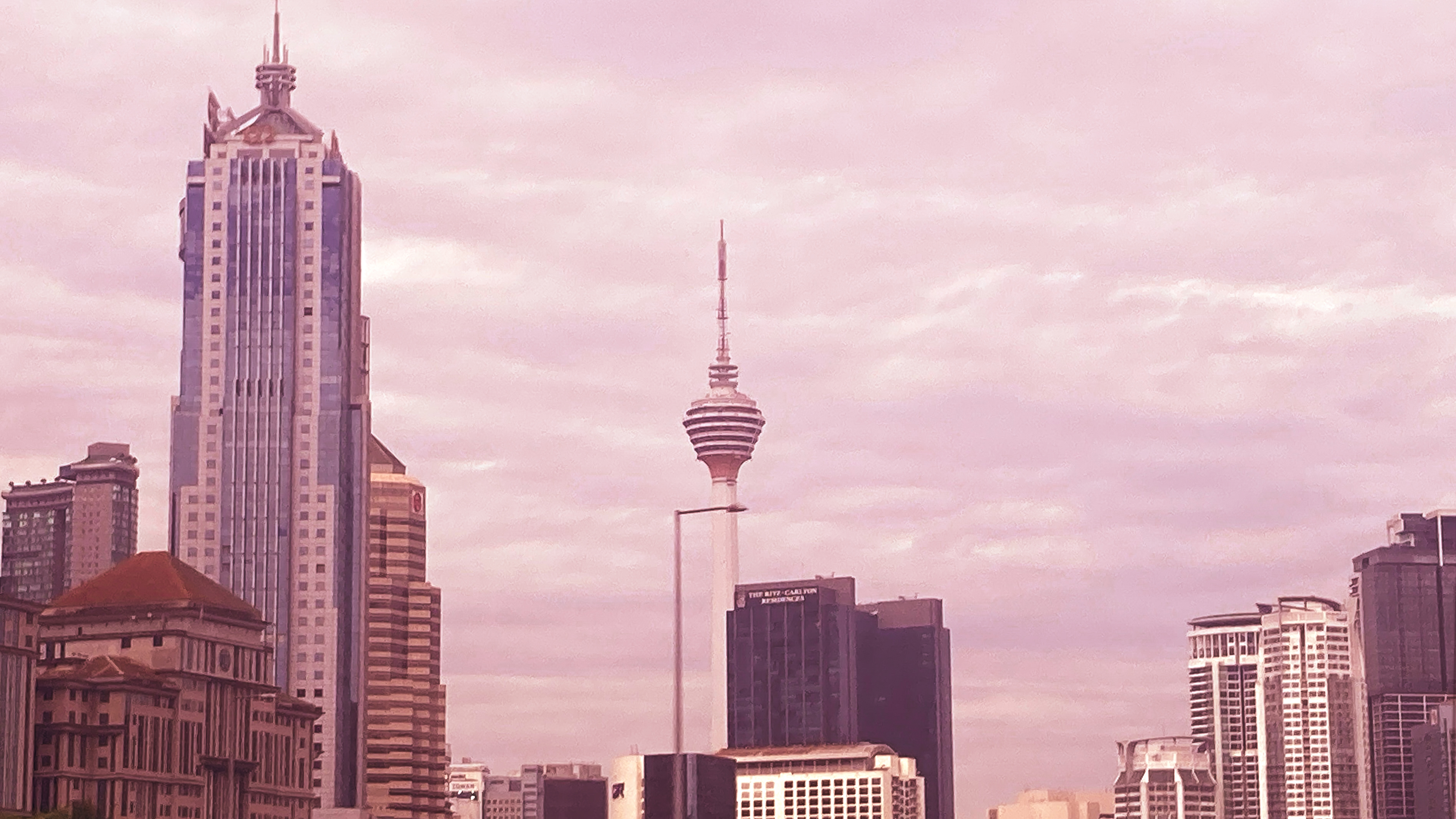
Panoramic view of the Kuala Lumpur Tower alongside the AmBank Tower on the left side of the picture

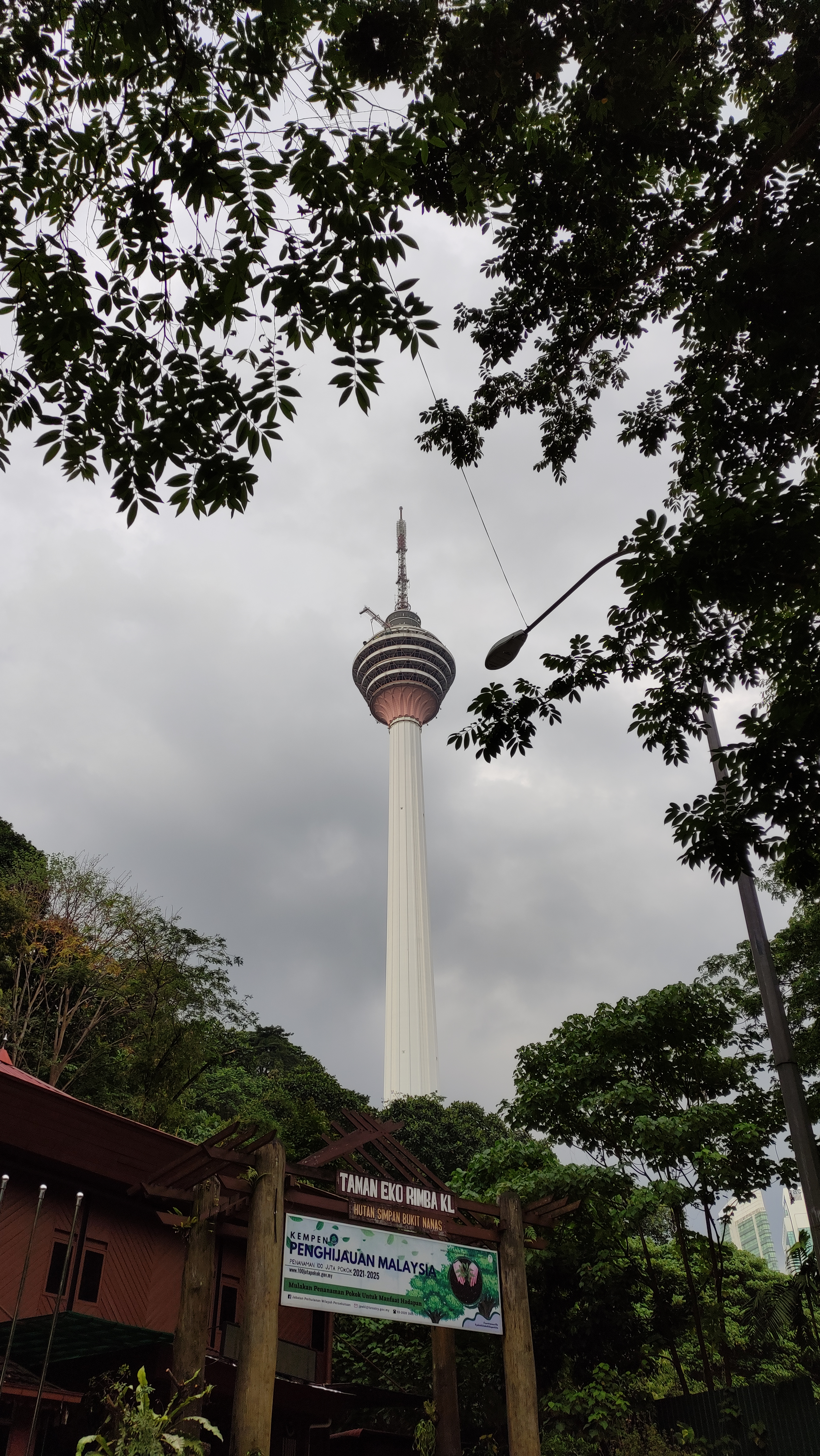
KL Tower seen from Bukit Nanas Forest Reserve

Kuala Lumpur Tower light show

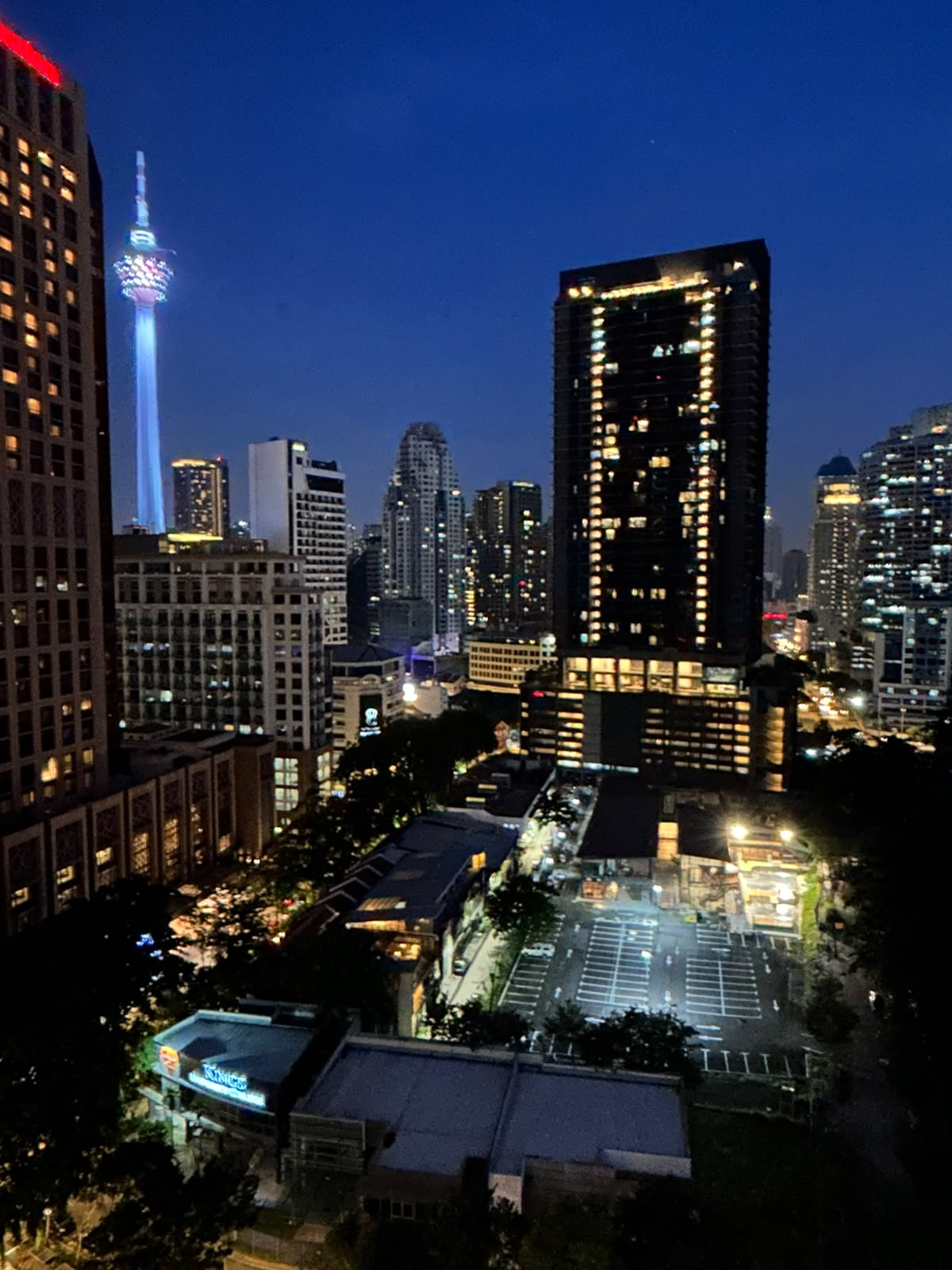
KL Tower seen in the background among the skyline, seen from the Quill Residences

== See also ==
- Petronas Towers
- List of towers
- List of tallest freestanding structures in the world
- Fernsehturm Stuttgart – first TV tower built from concrete and prototype
