= Kupi-Kupi FM =

kupikupifm
- Kota Kinabalu, Kuching and Seremban; Malaysia
- Broadcast area: Sabah, Sarawak and Negeri Sembilan

Programming
- Languages: Kadazan-Dusun, Melanau, Chinese, Iban, Bidayuh, Murut (for songs), Malaysian language (Sabah Malay and Sarawak Malay) and English (songs and broadcast languages)
- Format: Contemporary hits (CHR); Alternative music; Pop rock; Hip-hop music; Sarawak & Sabah ethnic music

Ownership
- Owner: Ooga X Sdn Bhd
- Sister stations: CITYPlus

History
- First air date: 2016

Links
- Website: kupikupifm.my

kupikupifm is a radio station from Sabah, Malaysia. The station features topics ranging from customs and traditions to social-economic development, global and social trends, health and nutrition as well as agriculture and enables local entertainers to showcase their talents with the station playing 80% Sabahan songs. It can also be heard from Kuala Penyu to Kota Belud and plans to expand transmission to other parts of Sabah in future.

== History ==
On 9 June 2023, Kupi-Kupi FM began broadcasting in Kuching, Sarawak on the 92.5 MHz frequency which transmits from Bukit Antu. It replaced the Chinese business radio station CITYPlus.

== Frequency ==
Frequencies	Area	Transmitter	Note
106.0 MHz	Seremban, Negeri Sembilan	Mount Telapak Buruk	Starting 13 October 2026 This frequency was previously used by CITYPlus.
92.5 MHz	Kuching, Sarawak	Bukit Antu	Starting 9 June 2023 This frequency was previously used by CITYPlus.
96.3 MHz	Kota Kinabalu, Sabah	Bukit Karatong	
