= 1Malaysia for Youth =

Youth initiative by the Malaysian government

Agency overview
- Formed: 2012
- Dissolved: 2018
- Type: Volunteerism
- Jurisdiction: Government of Malaysia
- Motto: Take Part. Get Involved. Make a Difference.
- Website: www.im4u.my www.1m4youth.com.my

1Malaysia for Youth, usually stylised as iM4U, was an initiative of the former Malaysian government of Barisan Nasional (BN) led by Najib Razak. It was created to encourage the volunteerism among Malaysian youth.

== History ==
The program launched in July 2012 and in January 2013 the first group of twenty iM4U ambassadors was announced.

== DRe1M ==
In addition to encourage volunteering, 1M4U offers funds to any youth organisations through the Dana Sukarelawan 1Malaysia (DRe1M) initiative. The funds were disbursed according to the submitted proposal.

== Number plate prefixes ==
In conjunction with the 1Malaysia for Youth movement, Najib Razak introduced a new special prefix of number plates, named 1M4U. Sale of the number plate prefix started on 10 March 2013. Najib himself was set to get the number plate 1M4U 11, as 11 was his favourite number.

The objective of introducing this special prefix is to raise funds as support for the movement's activities. Some were donated to the Poverty Eradication Foundation, the Malaysian Children's Hope Foundation and the National Athletes Welfare Foundation.

== Dissolution ==
IM4U became dormant and was dissolved after the downfall of BN government in the 2018 general election.

== See also ==
- iM4U fm
