= SelangorTV =

Malaysian television channel

- Country: Malaysia
- Headquarters: Shah Alam, Selangor, Malaysia

Programming
- Picture format: 1080i HDTV (downscaled to 16:9 576i for the SDTV feed)

Ownership
- Owner: Media Selangor Sdn Bhd (Subsidiary of Menteri Besar Selangor Incorporated)

History
- Launched: 2008

Links
- Website: selangortv.my

Availability

Streaming media

SelangorTV is a Malaysian online streaming TV Channel owned by the State Government of Selangor, through its State-owned enterprise Menteri Besar Selangor Incorporated subsidiary – Media Selangor Sdn Bhd. It began operation in 2008. SelangorTV was formed by the State Government because the Federal Government would not allow them to use Federal Government TV channels to deliver information or news about the state government of Selangor to the people.

Because the channel does not have a license from the Federal government to broadcast terrestrial or satellite TV, SelangorTV is currently only available via the internet at Selangorku website. The main broadcast language is Bahasa Melayu and the channel features a variety of programme's including talkshows, short dramas, news, and documentaries. It is viewable 24 hours a day.

Anyhow, after the transfer of power of Federal Government in 2018, it is now a listed Selangor media at the official website of Department of Information Malaysia.
