= CITYPlus =

CITY+
- Kuala Lumpur; Malaysia
- Broadcast area: Klang Valley
- Frequency: 106.0 MHz

Programming
- Language: Chinese
- Format: Talk radio

Ownership
- Owner: Ooga X Sdn Bhd
- Sister stations: kupikupifm

History
- First air date: 2 May 2017
- Last air date: 13 February 2026

Links
- Webcast: WebCast
- Website: cityplusfm.my

CITY+ is a Chinese business radio station catering primarily to Chinese-speaking PMEBs (Professionals, Managers, Executives and Businessmen) and SMEs in Malaysia. It is owned by Ooga X Sdn Bhd.

== History ==
The radio station started its trial transmission in Kuching from 24 April 2016 to 27 April 2018 on FM 92.5 MHz. This frequency was rebranded as the third Chinese business radio station.

Meanwhile, another trial transmission was aired in Klang Valley on FM 106.0 MHz by launching a transmitter in Bukit Sungai Besi. On 2 May 2017, the radio station was officially launched in these areas. This frequency for Seremban was formerly carried by Red FM before June 2009.

The radio station covers topics of international and local headlines and interviews with corporate personalities. It also covers topics from the corporate, health, automotive and property sectors. During non-DJ hours (midnight to 6am), Chinese independent music from Taiwan, Malaysia, Singapore, Hong Kong and China, as well as English or Japanese songs are aired.

On 1 April 2020, CITYPlus FM ceased transmission in Kuching, Sarawak through the frequency on FM 92.5 MHz which transmitted from Bukit Djin to Bukit Antu and it was replaced by kupikupifm on 9 June 2023.

From 13 February to 3 September 2026, CITYPlus FM temporary suspended transmission in Seremban, Negeri Sembilan on FM 106.0 MHz which transmitted from Bukit Sungai Besi. On 12 September 2026, the station broadcast test transmissions for the then-upcoming rebrand. CITYPlus FM's frequency is now used by the Malay Sabahan-oriented radio station, kupikupifm, starting 13 October 2026.
