= Rakita (Malaysian radio station) =

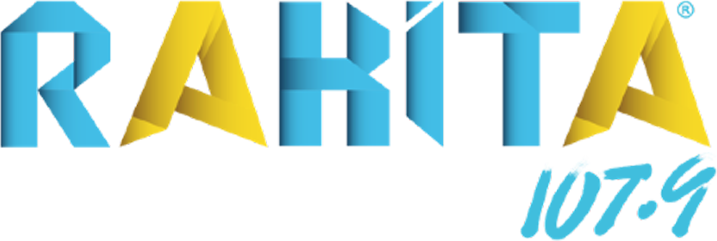
- Klang Valley; Malaysia
- Broadcast area: Klang Valley and Seremban
- Frequency: 107.9 MHz

Programming
- Language: Malay

Ownership
- Owner: Radio Kita Sdn. Bhd.

History
- First air date: 8 January 2019; 7 years ago

Links
- Website: rakita.my

Rakita (stylised in all caps) is a Malaysian radio station and operated by Radio Kita Sdn. Bhd. The radio was rebranded from the previously aired iM4U fm that ceased operation in 2018.

== History ==
=== iM4U fm (2014–2018) ===
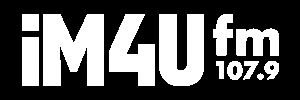
iM4U logo.

iM4U fm was a Malaysian radio station launched by 1Malaysia for Youth (iM4U) and operated by Genmedia Sdn. Bhd. It began broadcasting on 15 September 2014 via its frequency 107.9 FM in Klang Valley. iM4U fm aired at the Kompleks Rakan Muda, Puchong, Selangor and played 70 percent Malay language songs and 30 percent English language songs. The station was targeted at Malaysian urban youth. The radio station announced on Twitter that they would cease broadcasting on 29 June 2018. In January 2019, the defunct iM4U FM was rebranded as Rakita.

== See also ==
- iM4U
