= Ai FM =

Ai FM (爱FM)
- Kuala Lumpur; Malaysia
- Broadcast area: Malaysia, Singapore, Brunei, part of Indonesia and Thailand
- Frequency: Varies depending on region

Programming
- Languages: Chinese (Mandarin (main), Hokkien, Teochew, Hakka and Cantonese)
- Format: Easy listening, Talk, News, Oldies

Ownership
- Owner: Radio Televisyen Malaysia
- Sister stations: Asyik FM; Minnal FM; Nasional FM; Radio Klasik; TraXX FM

History
- First air date: 17 January 1971; 55 years ago
- Former names: Green Network (1971–2005)

Links
- Webcast: rtmklik.rtm.gov.my/radio/nasional/ai-fm
- Website: aifm.rtm.gov.my

Ai FM formerly known as Radio 5 Chinese service (Chinese name: 爱 FM, literally "Love FM") is the oldest Malaysian Mandarin-language radio station for Malaysian Chinese community operated by Radio Televisyen Malaysia was first broadcast on 1 April 1946 as Radio Malaya. It is broadcast 24 hours a day (starting on 28 December 1994), 7 days a week.

The station mostly plays easy listening and Oldies from the 1950s, 1960s and 1970s similar and related to Capital 95.8FM in Singapore and Melody in Malaysia as targeting listeners between the age of 50 to now.

== Etymology ==
The station's name means "love" in Mandarin and carries a universal meaning. The name was chosen through discussions with various parties including leaders of MCA.

== History ==
The station started as Radio Malaya operating of George Town, Penang on 1 April 1946. With the independence of Malaya on 31 August 1957 after its establishment, the radio station Perkhidmatan Bahasa Cina (Chinese Language Service).

On 19 January 1971, Perkhidmatan Bahasa Cina was known as Rangkaian Hijau (Green Network).

On 1 January 1989, Rangkaian Hijau was known as Radio 5.

On 28 December 1994, Radio 5 was started broadcasting 24 hours a day.

Ai FM adopts the easy listening and Oldies radio format with the majority of the playlist consisting of Easy listening and Oldies music from the 1950s, 1960s and 1970s.

On daily nights features Golden Oldies music from the 1950s and 1960s.

== Frequency ==
=== Radio ===
| Frequencies | Area | Transmitter |
|---|---|---|
| 89.3 MHz | Kuala Lumpur | Kuala Lumpur Tower |
| 106.7 MHz | Shah Alam, Selangor | Gunung Ulu Kali |
| 101.3 MHz | Perlis, Alor Setar, Kedah and Penang | Mount Jerai |
| 106.1 MHz | Taiping, Perak | Bukit Larut |
| 106.1 MHz | Kuantan, Pahang | Bukit Perlindung |
| 92.1 MHz | Ipoh, Perak | Gunung Kledang |
| 89.7 MHz | Seremban, Negeri Sembilan | Mount Telapak Buruk |
| 100.4 MHz | Malacca | Mount Ledang |
| 104.9 MHz | Johor Bahru, Johor and Singapore | Mount Pulai |
| 104.9 MHz | Batam, Bintan, Riau, Indonesia | Mount Pulai |
| 90.5 MHz | Kuala Terengganu, Terengganu | Bukit Besar |
| 105.7 MHz | Kota Bharu, Kelantan | Telipot |
| 90.7 MHz | Kuching, Sarawak | Gunung Serapi |
| 92.3 MHz | Labuan | Bukit Timbalai |
| 91.9 MHz | Kota Kinabalu, Sabah | Bukit Lawa Mandau |

=== Television ===
| TV Platform | Channel |
|---|---|
| MYTV | 704 |
