= Asyik FM =

- Kuala Lumpur; Malaysia
- Broadcast area: Peninsular Malaysia
- Frequencies: See list

Programming
- Languages: Aslian, Malay
- Format: Talk, Top 40 (CHR)

Ownership
- Owner: Radio Televisyen Malaysia
- Sister stations: Ai FM; Minnal FM; Nasional FM; Radio Klasik; TraXX FM

History
- Founded: 3 February 1959; 67 years ago
- First air date: 1 April 2005; 21 years ago (Asyik FM): 15 February 2009; 17 years ago (Salam FM)
- Former names: Radio Malaysia Saluran Tujuh; RTM Radio 7

Links
- Webcast: rtmklik.rtm.gov.my/radio/nasional/asyikfm-salamfm
- Website: asyikfm.rtm.gov.my

Asyik FM, formerly known as Radio 7 Aslian language service, is an Orang Asli radio station operated by Malaysian state broadcaster Radio Televisyen Malaysia (RTM). The frequency is shared with Salam FM (Jakim Radio), an Islamic radio station operated by Department of Islamic Development Malaysia (JAKIM) with cooperation from RTM for the remaining timeslot from midnight to 8:00am (local time).

== Frequencies ==
=== Radio ===
Radio transmitters
Frequencies	Area	Transmitter
91.1 MHz	Kuala Lumpur	Kuala Lumpur Tower
102.5 MHz	Shah Alam, Selangor	Gunung Ulu Kali
95.6 MHz	Malacca and Northern Johor	Mount Ledang
89.3 MHz	Ulu Tembeling, Jerantut, Pahang	RTM Ulu Tembeling
105.1 MHz	Cameron Highlands, Pahang	Mount Batu Brinchang
93.1 MHz	Lenggong, Perak	Bukit Ladang Teh

=== Television ===
Television channels carrying Asyik FM
TV Platform	Channel
MYTV	706
