= Nasional FM =

Kuala Lumpur; Malaysia
- Broadcast area: Malaysia
- Frequency: Varies depending on its region

Programming
- Language: Malay
- Format: Talk, Full-service radio and Top 40 (CHR)

Ownership
- Owner: Radio Televisyen Malaysia
- Sister stations: Ai FM; Asyik FM; Minnal FM; Radio Klasik; TraXX FM

History
- First air date: 20 June 1975; 50 years ago (FM Stereo); 1 January 2012; 14 years ago (Nasional FM)

Links
- Webcast: rtmklik.rtm.gov.my/radio/nasional/nasional-fm
- Website: nasionalfm.rtm.gov.my

Nasional FM is a Malay language-radio station operated by Radio Televisyen Malaysia. It was also Malaysia's first radio station to broadcast in FM Stereo since its launch on 20 June 1975. Their former motto were Segalanya di sini (Everything is here) and Stesen Muzik Anda (Your Music Station).

== Former names ==
The station was formerly known as Radio Muzik, Radio 1, Radio 2, Radio Malaysia Saluran Muzik, Radio FM Stereo, and Muzik FM.

== History ==
The government announced in August 1994 that the music-oriented Radio 2 would begin broadcasting 24 hours a day. It had previously broadcast 18 hours a day.

Due to the demerger of Klasik Nasional FM on 1 January 2012, Muzik FM's frequencies and announcers were merged into Nasional FM. However, Muzik FM continues broadcasting online via the internet and it later merged with Muzik Aktif under the Galaksi Muzik RTM branding before it ceases transmission in late 2017. Nasional FM's current motto is Sentiasa di Hati (Always in the Heart).

== Frequency ==
Frequencies	Area	Transmitter
88.5 MHz	Kuala Lumpur	Kuala Lumpur Tower
88.5 MHz	Labuan	Bukit Timbalai
95.3 MHz	Shah Alam, Selangor	Gunung Ulu Kali
100.5 MHz	Perlis, Alor Setar, Kedah and Penang	Mount Jerai
107.1 MHz	Taiping, Perak	Bukit Larut
107.1 MHz	Kuantan, Pahang	Bukit Pelindung
90.9 MHz	Ipoh, Perak	Gunung Kledang
91.7 MHz	Seremban, Negeri Sembilan	Mount Telapak Buruk
91.7 MHz	Kuala Terengganu, Terengganu	Bukit Besar
96.6 MHz	Malacca	Mount Ledang
105.7 MHz	Johor Bahru, Johor and Singapore	Mount Pulai
105.7 MHz	Batam, Bintan, Riau, Indonesia	Mount Pulai
101.9 MHz	Kota Bharu, Kelantan	Telipot
88.1 MHz	Kuching, Sarawak	Gunung Serapi
88.9 MHz	Kota Kinabalu, Sabah	Bukit Lawa Mandau

=== Television ===
TV Platform	Channel
Astro/NJOI	869
MYTV	701
