= TraXX FM =

- Kuala Lumpur; Malaysia
- Broadcast area: Malaysia, Singapore, Brunei, part of Indonesia and Thailand
- Frequency: Varies depending on its region

Programming
- Language: English (Manglish)
- Format: Talk; Full-service radio; Top 40 (CHR)

Ownership
- Owner: Radio Televisyen Malaysia
- Sister stations: Ai FM; Asyik FM; Minnal FM; Nasional FM; Radio Klasik

History
- First air date: 1 April 2005; 21 years ago as Traxx FM; 1946; 80 years ago (as the English Language Service)

Links
- Webcast: rtmklik.rtm.gov.my/radio/nasional/32959
- Website: rtmklik.rtm.gov.my/radio/nasional/32959

TraXX FM is a 24/7 English-language radio station operated by Radio Televisyen Malaysia. Established on 1 April 2005, it was previously known as the English Language Service in 1946, the Blue Network in 1959 and Radio 4 in 1993.

== History ==
RTM's English broadcasts in 1940 was under the Malayan Broadcasting Corporation (MBC, also succeeded by Mediacorp) reorganised from the British Malaya Broadcasting Corporation which covered both Malaya especially the Straits Settlements, and Singapore, from 1935 to 1940.

The station's name "TraXX" (in use since 1 April 2005, as a part of re-branding of RTM's radio stations) is derived from the word 'Track' and 'XX', the later denoting the old tagline 'Xperience the Xcitement'. The station's initial tagline was 'Travel and Music' after re-branding to a tourism-oriented radio station. It then switched back to "Experience the Excitement" to suit its current role as an information-based and generalist radio station with a wide range of programmes and all kinds of music genres (K-Pop, English and Malay music).

== Frequency ==
=== Radio ===
| Frequencies | Area | Transmitter |
|---|---|---|
| 90.3 MHz | Kuala Lumpur | Kuala Lumpur Tower |
| 100.1 MHz | Selangor | Gunung Ulu Kali |
| 98.7 MHz | Perlis, Alor Setar, Kedah and Penang | Mount Jerai |
| 105.3 MHz | Taiping, Perak | Bukit Larut |
| 105.3 MHz | Kuantan, Pahang | Bukit Pelindung |
| 90.1 MHz | Ipoh, Perak | Bukit Kledang |
| 88.7 MHz | Seremban, Negeri Sembilan | Mount Telapak Buruk |
| 97.4 MHz | Malacca | Mount Ledang |
| 102.9 MHz | Johor Bahru, Johor and Singapore | Mount Pulai |
| 102.9 MHz | Batam, Bintan, Riau, Indonesia | Mount Pulai |
| 89.7 MHz | Kuala Terengganu, Terengganu | Bukit Besar |
| 104.7 MHz | Kota Bharu, Kelantan | Telipot |
| 89.9 MHz | Kuching, Sarawak | Gunung Serapi |
| 90.3 MHz | Labuan | Bukit Timbalai |
| 90.7 MHz | Kota Kinabalu, Sabah | Bukit Lawa Mandau |

TraXX FM 90.1 MHz Gunung Kledang gets interference from Kool FM 90.2 MHz Bukit Penara in some Padang Rengas places. However, in Padang Rengas listeners can tune in clearly on 105.3 MHz Bukit Larut.

=== Television ===
| TV Platform | Channel |
|---|---|
| MYTV | 702 |

== Awards ==
| Year | Category | Award | Programme | Results | Ref. |
|---|---|---|---|---|---|
| 2009 | Best Radio Programme | UNICEF International Children's Day of Broadcasting (ICDB) Regional Awards | Listen Up! | Won | |
| 2018 | Outstanding Achievement in Broadcast Media | Red Ribbon Media Awards | The Morning Show Special Interview on World AIDS Day: Treatment Literacy, Awareness and Sensitization | Nominated | |
