= Minnal FM =

- Kuala Lumpur; Malaysia
- Broadcast area: Peninsular Malaysia Singapore and Indonesia
- Frequency: Varies depending on its region

Programming
- Language: Tamil
- Format: Contemporary music; Infotainment; General; Top 40 (CHR)

Ownership
- Owner: Radio Televisyen Malaysia
- Sister stations: Ai FM; Asyik FM; Nasional FM; Radio Klasik; TraXX FM

Links
- Webcast: rtmklik.rtm.gov.my/radio/nasional/minnal-fm
- Website: minnalfm.rtm.gov.my

Minnal FM (Tamil: மின்னல்) is a Malaysian state owned Indian language radio station, owned and operated by Radio Televisyen Malaysia. Most of the shows on the station are aired in Tamil. The channel airs songs in Malayalam, Hindi and Telugu. The station was the first 24-hour Indian language broadcast service in the world, serving as a source of information and entertainment for Malaysian Indians.

The station's name means "thunder" in Tamil. The name was given by then-Minister of Works Samy Vellu.

== Frequency ==
=== Radio ===
| Frequencies | Area | Transmitter |
|---|---|---|
| 92.3 MHz | Kuala Lumpur | Kuala Lumpur Tower |
| 96.3 MHz | Shah Alam, Selangor | Gunung Ulu Kali |
| 96.7 MHz | Perlis Alor Setar, Kedah and Penang | Mount Jerai |
| 107.9 MHz | Taiping, Perak | Bukit Larut |
| 98.9 MHz | Ipoh, Perak | Bukit Kledang |
| 90.5 MHz | Seremban, Negeri Sembilan | Mount Telapak Buruk |
| 103.3 MHz | Malacca | Mount Ledang |
| 103.3 MHz | Kuantan, Pahang | Bukit Pelindung |
| 101.1 MHz | Johor Bahru, Johor and Singapore | Mount Pulai |
| 101.1 MHz | Batam, Bintan, Riau Islands, Indonesia | Mount Pulai |
| 87.9 MHz | Kuala Terengganu, Terengganu | Bukit Besar |
| 106.7 MHz | Kota Bharu, Kelantan | Telipot |

=== Television ===
| TV Platform | Channel |
|---|---|
| MYTV | 703 |
