= Radio Klasik =

- Kuala Lumpur; Malaysia
- Broadcast area: Malaysia, Singapore, Brunei, parts of Indonesia and Thailand
- Frequency: Varies depending on region

Programming
- Language: Malay
- Format: Classic hits, Easy listening and Oldies

Ownership
- Owner: Radio Televisyen Malaysia
- Sister stations: Ai FM; Asyik FM; Nasional FM; Minnal FM; TraXX FM

History
- First air date: 19 January 1971; 55 years ago (as National Network); 1 January 2012; 14 years ago (as Radio Klasik)

Links
- Webcast: rtmklik.rtm.gov.my/radio/nasional/radio-klasik
- Website: radioklasik.rtm.gov.my

Radio Klasik, formerly known as Radio 1 National Service, is the oldest Malay language radio station. Operated by Radio Televisyen Malaysia, it first broadcast on 1 April 1946 as Radio Malaya. Its main motto is Menggamit Kenangan (Reaching Memories). The station primarily plays classic hits, easy listening, and oldies from the 1950s to 1990s. It is similar to and related to Warna 94.2FM in Singapore and Sinar in Malaysia, targeting listeners aged 50 and above. Radio Klasik broadcasts 24 hours a day, 7 days a week, a service it began offering on 19 January 1971.

== History ==
The station first broadcast as Radio Malaya on 1 April 1946 from George Town, Penang. With the independence of Malaya on 31 August 1957, Radio Malaya was split into two. The original studios in Singapore were taken over by a new station called Radio Singapura (currently known as Mediacorp Radio), while Radio Malaya moved to Kuala Lumpur and began broadcasting from the new location on 1 January 1959.

On 19 January 1971, Radio Malaya was renamed to Rangkaian Nasional (National Network) and became the first station in Malaysia to broadcast 24 hours a day.

On 1 January 1989, Rangkaian Nasional was renamed to Radio 1.

Another predecessor, RIMA, which was planned for launch in 1997, was described as a "24-hour" "Malay traditional music and songs" radio station.

Radio Klasik adopts the classic hits, easy listening, and Oldies radio format, with the majority of the playlist consisting of music from the 1950s to 1990s.

Daily features include Golden Oldies music from the 1950s and 1960s.

== National anthem ==
Like all other RTM and regional radio stations, Radio Klasik plays the national anthem every midnight.

== Frequency ==
Frequencies	Area	Transmitter
87.7 MHz	Kuala Lumpur	Kuala Lumpur Tower
98.3 MHz	Shah Alam, Selangor	Gunung Ulu Kali
94.9 MHz	Perlis, Alor Setar, Kedah and Penang	Mount Jerai
103.3 MHz	Taiping, Perak	Bukit Larut
88.3 MHz	Ipoh, Perak	Gunung Keledang
87.9 MHz	Seremban, Negeri Sembilan	Mount Telapak Buruk
93.6 MHz	Malacca	Mount Ophir
106.7 MHz	Johor Bahru, Johor and Singapore	Mount Pulai
106.7 MHz	Batam, Bintan, Riau, Indonesia	Mount Pulai
107.9 MHz	Kuantan, Pahang	Bukit Pelindung
92.5 MHz	Kuala Terengganu, Terengganu	Bukit Besar
101.1 MHz	Kota Bharu, Kelantan	Telipot
92.9 MHz	Kuching, Sarawak	Gunung Serapi
87.6 MHz	Labuan	Bukit Timbalai
88.1 MHz	Kota Kinabalu, Sabah	Bukit Lawa Mandau

=== Television ===
TV Platform	Channel
MYTV	705
