= List of programmes broadcast by TV2 (Malaysia) =

This is a list of television programmes either currently broadcast, repeat broadcast and formerly broadcast on RTM TV2 Malaysia.

== Saranghae On 2 ==
- Triple (MBC)
- A Thousand Days' Promise (SBS)
- Ojakgyo Family (KBS2)
- Kimchi Family (JTBC)
- Bachelor's Vegetable Store (Channel A)
- Brain (KBS)
- Syndrome (JTBC)
- Padam Padam (JTBC)
- My Kids Give Me a Headache (JTBC)
- Love in Her Bag (JTBC)
- Spy Myung-wol (KBS2)
- Discovery of Love (KBS)
- Tears of Heaven (MBN)
- Mask (SBS)
- Hyde Jekyll, Me (SBS)
- Temptation (SBS)
- My Unfortunate Boyfriend (MBC)
- Healer (KBS)
- Medical Top Team (MBC)
- Ex-Girlfriends' Club (tvN)
- My Horrible Boss (JTBC)
- I Remember You (KBS)
- Warm and Cozy (MBC)
- Man X Man (JTBC)
- My Secret Terrius (MBC)
- Welcome to Waikiki (JTBC)
- Lawless Lawyer (tvN)
- Squad 38 (OCN)
- Mad Dog (KBS2)
- Partners for Justice (MBC)
- True Beauty (tvN)
- Life on Mars (OCN)
- Witch at Court (KBS2)

== Chinese Drama ==
- Dr. Qin Medical Examiner
- My Dream Home
- My Little Princess
- School Beauty's Personal Bodyguard
- The Imperial Doctress
- Detective Dee
- Can't Buy Me Love
- Sound of the Desert
- Hui Jia De You Huo
- Young Sherlock
- Boss & Me
- My Sister of Eternal Flower
- Relic of an Emissary
- The Big Mistakes
- Golden Turbulence
- Love Me Tender
- Vengeance Code
- Moonlight Saigon
- Missing You
- Shadows of Love
- Life Without Regret
- Missing In Possibble

== EN Drama ==
- S.W.A.T. (CBS)
- Covert Affairs (USA Network)
- NCIS (CBS)
- NCIS: Los Angeles (CBS) (Coming Soon)
- Damages (FX)
- Dexter (Showtime)
- Chuck (NBC)
- The River (ABC)
- Beauty And The Beast (CBS)
- Magnum P.I. (CBS & NBC) (Coming Soon)
- The Rookie (ABC) (Coming Soon)
- SEAL Team (CBS) (Coming Soon)
- Hudson & Rex (Citytv)
- Smallville (The WB & The CW)
- Everwood (The WB) (Coming Soon)
- One Tree Hill (The WB & The CW) (Coming Soon)
- Psych (USA Network) (Coming Soon)
- Ray Donovan (Showtime) (Coming Soon)
- The Walking Dead (AMC) (Coming Soon)
- 9-1-1 (FOX)
- The X-Files (FOX)
- Stalker (CBS)
- Rookie Blue (ABC)
- Falling Skies (TNT)
- The Librarians (TNT)
- MacGyver (CBS)
- Make It Or Break It (ABC)
- Scandal (ABC)
- Supergirl (CBS)
- Blue Bloods (CBS)
- Humans (Channel 4)
- Knight Rider (NBC)
- Hawaii Five-O (CBS)

== Entertainment & variety shows ==
- Penn & Teller: Fool Us
- The Brain USA Superhuman
- #HTV! (formerly aired on TV1)
- Face Off
- Running Man (also aired on TV9) (formerly on NTV7)
- Game Changers
- Kids Baking Championships
- The Great Australian Spelling Bee (All 2 seasons)
- M Countdown (formerly aired on 8TV)
- King of Mask Singer
- So You Think You Can Dance: The Next Generation
- WWE Bottom Line 2021 (11 October 2021) (Monday 12:00 am
- WWE NXT 2021 (7 October 2021) (Thursday 12:00 am
- WWE SmackDown
  - WWE SmackDown 2020 (29 July 2020) (Wednesday 12:00 am to 1:30 am)
  - WWE SmackDown 2021 (6 October 2021) (Wednesday 12:00 am to 1:30 am)
- WWE This Week
  - WWE This Week 2020 (1 August 2020) (Saturday 12:30 am to 1:30 am)
  - WWE This Week 2021 (10 October 2021) (Sunday 1:00 am to 2:00 am)
- Junior Bake Off
- All Around Champion
- Gamerz
- Top Chef Family Style
- Lego Masters USA

== Talk show On 2 ==
- Fresh Brew (moved to Berita RTM and TV Okey, formerly Hello on Two)
- Vasantham (simulcast with Berita RTM and TV Okey)
- What Say You? (simulcast with Berita RTM and TV Okey)

== News ==
- Berita Mandarin (Daily 12:00 pm and 7:00 pm on Berita RTM and TV2)
- World Today (Daily 12:30 pm on Berita RTM and TV2)
- Tamil Seithigal (Daily 7:30 pm on Berita RTM and TV2)

== Toon On 2 ==
- Abus
- Abu & Aben
- Adi Genius
- A...Do B...Re C...Me
- Arnab Dan Kura Kura
- Asian Legends
- Barbie Dreamhouse Adventures
- Beyblade Burst Evolution
- Beyblade Burst Turbo
- Beyblade Burst Rise
- Beyblade Burst Surge (Incomplete Episode)
- Biskut Lemak
- Blaze and the Monster Machines (also on TV3)
- Boonie Bears
- Boonie Bears: The Adventurers
- Budak Besi
- Budin oh Budin
- Captain Tsubasa
- Brandy & Mr. Whiskers
- Fillmore!
- Cardfight Vanguard V Series
- Chellup
- Cingkus Blues
- Chop Chop Ninja
- CJ the DJ
- Cross Fight B-Daman
- Doplo Doplo
- Dunia Air Tawar
- Dunia Ddee
- Dino Rampage
- Dragon Lancer
- Danny Phantom
- Ejen C
- Ejen 123
- El Tigre
- Electro Boy
- Franklin and Friends
- Fanboy And Chum Chum
- Famous Dog Lassie
- Fruiterama
- The Mighty B
- Go For Speed
- Gormiti: The Supreme Eclipse Era
- Inspector Gadget
- Jaguh Silat
- Jake and the Never Land Pirates (formerly aired on NTV7)
- Jack
- Jinggo
- Jing-Ju Cats (also aired on Astro Xiao Tai Yang)
- Kacang,
- Kainar Asy-Tac Fronteer
- Kancil
- Kapluk Dari Kapluwi
- Kazoops!
- Ke Zoo
- Kick Buttowski: Suburban Daredevil (English Version)
- Kiddo Science
- Konda Kondi
- Kuu Kuu Harajuku
- Katri, Girl of the Meadows
- Lilo & Stitch
- Little Charmers
- Lost in Oz (also aired On TA-DAA!)
- Mac & Ted (also airs on TV Okey)
- Master Raindrop
- Matt
- Max & Maestro
- Megatik
- Mini Ninjas
- Mini Sains
- Misi Ady
- Motown Magic
- Nadim
- Ngat & Taboh
- Noddy: Toyland Detective
- Pak Pandir Moden
- Paksi Adiwira
- Panda Warrior
- Pendekar Lima
- The Penguins of Madagascar
- PJ Masks
- Planet Saga
- Polkadot
- Puteri Delima Sakti
- Raihan Rangers
- Ranggi
- Rat-a-Tat
- Rev-Evolution
- Robin Hood
- Robo X
- Saga Atuk
- Satria 7 Pahlawan
- Soceer Bugs
- Sofia the First
- Space Racers
- Sugar Pals
- Sumo Mouse
- Supa Strikas
- Synostone (repeat from TV Okey)
- Tales of Tatonka
- Taman Laut
- Teen Titans (also aired on ntv7 & Awesome TV)
- Teen Titans Go!
- The First
- The Legend of Korra
- The Tom & Jerry Show
- Tom & Jerry
- Tomica Hero
- Transformers Animated
- Trolls: The Beat Goes On!
- Tulis
- Upin & Ipin (Season 10 - 11) (also airs on Astro Ceria and Astro Prima)
- Wakfu
- X-Men Evolution
- Zoo Kita

=== Live Action ===
- Kids Go!
- ABC Hooray
- Kidzoners
- Chiki Boom
- Buzz
- Siapa Raime
- Putra
- Apit Dan Pendekar Legenda
- Wira Kasih
- Geng Penyiasat Sekolah
- Nine P.I.
- Chimie
- Ultraman Mebius
- Choushinsei Flashman
- Hikari Sentai Maksman
- Mirai Sentai Timeranger
- Hyakujuu Sentai Gaoranger
- GoGo Sentai Boukenger
- Engine Sentai Go-Onger
- Samurai Sentai Shinkenger
- Tensou Sentai Goseiger
- Power Rangers Super Megaforce
- Zyuden Sental Kyoryuger
- Power Rangers Dino Charge
- Garo The Makai No Hana & The Storm
- Garo The One Who Shines in the Darkness
- Soy Luna (Dubbed in Malay with English Subtitles) (Also airs on TV3, TV9 and NTV7)

=== 2021 ===
- Dogengers (Malay Dub) (3 April) (evening & morning animation) – The edutainment series is sponsored by Ohga Pharmacy Japan, whose mascot "Ohgaman" is one of the series' main characters, through subsidiary Ohgaman Malaysia. It is originally aired in Japan to raise awareness about medicine wastage.
