= Radio Televisyen Malaysia controversies =

This article outlines, in chronological order, the various controversies, criticisms and allegations involving or surrounding Radio Televisyen Malaysia (RTM), a broadcasting department of the Malaysian Government.

It includes arguments over political bias and impartiality, editorial mistakes and disputed broadcasts, misconduct by staff, and wider institutional failings. The article also covers RTM responses to these controversies, including internal investigations, public apologies, and external scrutiny.

== 1980s ==
=== 1982: Sabah Maulid coverage dispute ===
In February 1982, RTM's Sabah branch was criticised for its refusal to provide news coverage of Maulid Rasul processions in one of the state's districts. This prompted Mohamed Noor Mansor, the then-Sabah Financial Planning and Development Minister said that the broadcaster "had unintentionally refused to cover the event was tantamount to showing gross disrespect to Islam".

=== 1982: Sex scandal allegations ===
In March 1982, RTM was embroiled in alleged scandal involving a female artiste in which she was asked of sexual favours with some producers in an exchange for appearances on certain programmes. Afterwards, several artistes, including Nora Shamsuddin and Sahara Yaacob has called out to share about their experiences on the matter. The Ministry of Information in its press release said the two other singers Maria Kamal and Aizam Ibrahim have denied allegations in sexual propositioning by RTM producers that they "had apparently made to the press earlier". Following the scandal, the National Bureau of Investigation (now the Malaysian Anti-Corruption Commission) have seized thousands of documents and payment vouchers after the complaints made against the RTM producers who misappropriated the artistes' money. In May, the then-Deputy Information Minister, Rahmah Othman confirmed that the police have completed investigation on the sex scandal allegations inside RTM while pointed that it "won't hesitate to take immediate action to anyone who were proven to be involved".

=== 1985: Tekaria quiz answer controversy ===
Tekaria, a game show program on TV1, sparked controversy when one of its contestants, Fahmi Kassim, a clerk, mistakenly answered the Strait of Malacca as "the longest straits in the world" instead of Tartar Straits during the broadcast of the pre-recorded 13th and final episode aired on 19 June 1985. The controversy led to the unusual move by RTM to clarify the matter on its news broadcast on 4 July.

In his letter sent to the New Straits Times editor, Fahmi said the Guinness Book of Records listed the Tartar Straits is the world's longest strait at about 800 kilometres and "marginally longer" than the Straits of Malacca. The 31st edition of the book, however, does not mention the Straits' length. RTM later quoted a statement by Malaysian Department of the Naval Hydrography which said the Straits of Malacca "is 176 km longer" than the Tartar Straits. The game show's panel member then expressed his surprised doubt over the answer, said that "this sort of controversy does not happen often". An RTM official said that different references sources "that might give different answer to the same question".

== 1990s ==
=== 1992: Coverage on Dili shooting incident ===
On 23 September 1992, members of the Golkar-affiliated Angkatan Muda Pembaharuan Indonesia (Indonesian Youth Reform Force) raised public objections to a 10-pm Berita Dunia broadcast of the 1991 Dili shooting incident which showed Indonesian soldiers opening fire and murdering 50 demonstrators in East Timor.

This coverage had nearly strained contemporary relations between Malaysia and Indonesia. The then-Information Minister, Mohamed Rahmat explained that the RTM's airing of the segment "was a mistake", while claiming that it is "not intended to embarrass the Indonesian Government". Furthermore, Indonesia has strongly objected over the incident's footage while also claiming it as an "insult" to them. On 27 September, RTM submitted the footage at the Indonesian Embassy in Kuala Lumpur for further investigation. Later on, the investigation of footage's airing was completed and Mohamed said it was made by staff from RTM's news division "upon their own consideration". He also said that the Dili incident airings does not reflect the government's stance on the issue (which sided with Indonesia against Timorese insurgents at the time). Indonesian Coordinating Minister for Political Affairs and Security, Sudomo assessed that the issue was "considered closed". On 7 October, an RTM senior editor was being transferred to another job following the incident

=== 1993: RM100 remuneration controversy ===
In July 1993, four radio announcers of Radio Tiga Ibukota (RMIK), one of RTM's national radio stations, were called by the Anti-Corruption Agency (ACA) for interrogation following the RM100 remuneration for an RTM program sponsored by a private company. At the same time, the then-Information Minister, Mohamed Rahmat stressed that any of RTM staffs should not received any incentives while carrying duties, while stating the next day that the payment did not just involve the radio station, but on the contrary, it is "a practice at district radio stations throughout Malaysia". Three days later, the then-Director General of Broadcasting, Jaafar Kamin were assigned to lead the investigation on the matter to address the issue.

On 21 July, the Ministry of Information said it would submit an investigation report on four RMIK announcers receive RM100 from sponsor company to the then-Chief Secretary of the Government, Ahmad Sarji Abdul Hamid, awhile at the same time, an RTM senior officer have interrogates several of RMIK announcers and officials to gather information on the allegation. Three days later, the ACA reiterated that it would continued the probe on the matter. On 25 September 1993, the Ministry have submitted the report to Ahmad Sarji, but yet to take any disciplinary action against the radio announcers. In October, the ACA proposed a disciplinary action to be taken by the Ministry, which is by suspending the announcer's salary.

=== 1996: Patrick Teoh's April Fools' joke ===
In April 1996, RTM's Radio 4 suspended one of its announcers, Patrick Teoh, for a month off breach its code of ethics for pulling an April Fools' joke announcing a non-existent advert about ducks placed on hot plates to make the ducks dance: the advert was a stunt by company Grey Advertising for its 10th anniversary as it placed advertisements in several newspapers looking for ducks to be featured in a commercial for a new snack, where the concept was to place ducks on a hot plate, so they would jump about on the plate.

=== 1998: Coverage of Anwar Ibrahim's sodomy trial ===
In 1998, RTM was accused for "downplaying the report" on former Deputy Prime Minister, Anwar Ibrahim at the time of his sodomy trials in its primetime news. An Utusan Malaysia article quoted that RTM has "shows no journalistic professionalism in not slotting the story as its main news item". Information Minister Mohamed Rahmat pointed out that the matter is entirely down to possible "misjudgment" while also rejected that certain RTM staffs "were out to sabotage the coverage". The Peninsula Malay Students Union (GPMS) president, Suhaimi Ibrahim urged RTM to be "more proactive in disseminating information on issues of national interest".

== 2000s ==
=== 2001: Anwar Ibrahim as Islamic extremist ===
In 2001, RTM was accused for defamed former Deputy Prime Minister, Anwar Ibrahim and allegedly labelling him as an "immoral leader" and an "Islamic extremist" in an RTM programs on 4 and 5 September. Anwar subsequently filed a RM100 million defamation suit against the broadcaster, the Broadcasting DG and the Government, but he decided to withdraw the suit three years later, on 23 March 2004.

=== 2004: Usage of 'infotainmen' in TV1 slogan ===
In 2004, TV1 rebranded with the new slogan 'Saluran Infotainmen Anda' (Your Infotainment Channel), which drew criticism following the usage of loanword 'infotainmen' (from English infotainment). The then-Deputy Information Minister, Zainuddin Maidin have said that the broadcaster will keep the word in TV1's new slogan. Later, the Dewan Bahasa dan Pustaka (DBP) stressed that the usage of 'infotainmen' word was "considered unsuitable" and "it is wrong in terms of terminology formation which doesn't signifies a clear meaning", while said that the broadcaster should use the purer 'infohibur' or 'inforia' instead. Zainuddin then reiterated that the word 'infotainmen' is appropriate while "it gets its meaning across well enough", while DBP board of management member, Johan Jaffar defend the word's usage and said that he "does not see any argument to reject that word". The Ministry of Information hold on its stance that it remained use that word as it "became a technical term used worldwide, including Germany, Japan and China". The issue resolved two years later, in 2006 when TV1 changes its slogan to "Saluran Inforia Anda" on 1 April.

=== 2006: Airing of Prophet Muhammad's caricature ===
On 3 February 2006, RTM came under fire following TV2's Mandarin News unintentional airing Danish newspaper Jyllands-Posten's caricatures of Muhammad while covering the controversy surrounding them. Following the incident, RTM's management was called out to give an explanation regarding the screening. Former Prime Minister, Mahathir Mohamad have ordered that the RTM officials who responsible for the caricature airing, should be suspended from duty.

=== 2007: Ban on Rosnah Mat Aris ===
On 1 March 2007, actress and comedienne Rosnah Mat Aris was given a one-year ban from appearing in any of RTM's radio and television stations following a nationwide uproar on in the live airing of TV3's talk show Sensasi on the topic of older women courting younger men the day before, where she supposedly compared the situation to Muhammad's marriage with Khadijah. Rosnah later said that she was surprised when the broadcaster suspended her without telling her any explanation beforehand, while described RTM's action as "unfair". Her suspension by RTM stirred much controversy, with some of film associations criticized the broadcaster of being immature and demanded the Ministry of Information to reconsider the decision of her suspension, while also stressed that the decision made by RTM "may affect other parties".

=== 2008: "Aku Bukan Musuh Harta" ===
In December 2008, song "Aku Bukan Musuh Harta" ("I'm Not an Enemy of the Wealth"), performed by Malaysian nasyid group Algebra featuring folk group, Kopratasa with lyrics written by former Perlis Mufti Mohd Asri Zainul Abidin was banned by RTM from airing on its radio and TV networks. The song's ban received much criticism from many. The then-Deputy Director-General of Broadcasting, Adilah Shek Omar said that the reason for the ban was due to its "rough lyrics". Mohd Asri later question on why the broadcaster ban the song with lyrics he wrote whereas it has a "higher moral values" and "does not dedicated to certain parties". He also pointed that the song has a good lesson for many.

== 2010s ==
=== 2010: Axing of Galeri Mandarin Nasional's Bakun Dam documentary ===
On 28 April 2010, RTM's former Broadcasting Director-General Ibrahim Yahya ordered the axing of current affairs programme Galeri Mandarin Nasional after the airing of two episodes on a 10-part series regarding the construction of the Bakun Dam in 1998 which displaced more than 10,000 natives of Belaga, Sarawak, after their forced relocation to Sungai Asap and Sungai Koyan in 1998. The series' producer Chou Z Lam reveals that the "documentary over the impact of the Bakun Dam on indigenous people in Sarawak was cancelled" due to "RTM's leadership's fears that it would negatively impact the Sibu by-election outcome". As a result of the documentary's axing, a demonstration took place outside RTM's headquarters, Angkasapuri in Kuala Lumpur on 19 May, calling for media freedom and to protest Chou's termination. At least 80 protesters, mostly from Rawang, demanded RTM air the 8 remaining episodes of the Bakun Dam documentary as well as the Parliament to reform RTM to ensure "its impartiality as a public service broadcaster". They also protested the axing of another of Chou's documentaries on the building of high-tension cables near villages in their residence. The Centre for Independent Journalism (CIJ) has demanded RTM and the Broadcasting DG to clarify the alleged censorship of the Bakun Dam documentary.

=== 2011: Airing of Disney depiction of Noah ===
On 24 October 2011, the film "Father Noah's Ark" as part of the Disney programme Mickey Mouse and Friends was broadcast on TV2 to outrage among Muslim viewers who object to its cartoonish depiction of Noah (also a prophet in Islam) as a "big-sized man with long bearded and bald". RTM released an official apology over the matter and said that it "would be careful in the future" while also stated that it also "hopes that viewers will continue to provide feedback to improve TV2's broadcast content".

=== 2013: Tampering of Royal Malaysia Police insignia ===
On 10 September 2013, RTM TV1's Berita Nasional had mistakenly displaying the Royal Malaysia Police (RMP) insignia misscribed as "Polis Raja Di Malaysia" instead of "Polis Di Raja Malaysia" during the news broadcast of 'Ops Cantas'. The then-Director-General of Broadcasting, Norhyati Ismail said a police report was made in the wake of the incident. RTM later issued an apology letter through its 12 midnight news and later sent to the RMP and the then-Inspector-General of Police, Khalid Abu Bakar. Both the police force and Khalid accepted the apology. Two days later, on 12 September, an RTM graphic designer, who was responsible for tampering the RMP logo, was sacked. To prevent further mishaps following the incident, RTM through its disciplinary committee held a conference to examine further actions to be taken.

=== 2014: 88 Kopitiam sitcom suspension controversy ===
On 6 February 2014, RTM suspended the broadcast of weekly Chinese sitcom, 88 Kopitiam for a short period following allegations that one of the series' actors, Lim Jing Miao was involved in Seputeh Member of Parliament (MP), Teresa Kok's 11-minute controversial satirical Chinese New Year video, entitled Onedeful Malaysia CNY 2014 said to lampoon topical current affairs while Kok plays "the role of a feng shui talk show host interviewing three panelists on their predictions for the lunar new year". The sitcom, which aired every Monday on TV2, revolves on current issues affecting the Malaysian Chinese communityThe then-DG of Broadcasting, Norhyati Ismail in a statement said that it "will review any programs that links its actors/actresses to activities that tarnish the country's name and image" and "did not hesitate to take any action against any parties who involved in such programs".

Two days later, Jing Miao was among the three actors who appeared in the video, was called up by the police for interrogation. Following the series' suspension, media watchdog Gerakan Media Marah (GERAMM) slammed RTM for the suspensionwhile citing that "the reason for the suspension to await an investigation involving the actor in the video clip that allegedly defames the country was made recklessly and hastily". The Federation of Screen Guilds of Malaysia (GAFIM) president, Jurey Latiff Rosli have urged the broadcaster to reassess the series' suspension while also stated that "it is unfair for the programme to be suspended just because one of its cast involved in the video". Kok later urged RTM to retract the 88 Kopitiam's suspension, denied that no actors from the series involved in her parody video while called it as a "desperate witch hunt" and "berated the authorities for taking recrimination measures against the artists in RTM or in the entertainment industry".

=== 2016: Unflattering coverage on Ahmad Bashah Md Hanipah ===
In February 2016, RTM was criticised for airing a video showing Ahmad Bashah Md Hanipah falling asleep during his sworn as the Menteri Besar of Kedah at Alor Setar's Istana Anak Bukit; which was screenshot and went viral on social media not long after. Actor Afdlin Shauki publicly rebuked the broadcaster on his Facebook page describing the coverage as "creating problems" and urged RTM to provide more professional coverage or reporting.

=== 2016: Gaffe on Abu Sayyaf as Roman Catholic devotees ===
On 14 June 2016, a Berita Dunia presenter covering the Moro conflict made a gaffe due to a teleprompter error which was read: " Abu Sayyaf, based in the southern island of the Philippines, which is Roman Catholic, is known for kidnapping, killing...". A day later, RTM issued an apology regarding the matter through a video posted in its Facebook status and submitted an original text that should read by the presenter to refer the Philippines which majority of its citizen were the Roman Catholic devotees.

=== 2017: 2017 SEA Games scattered flag controversy ===
During the 2017 SEA Games, an error over flags of participating countries in the Games displayed in a confused and disorderly fashion as seen on TV2 went viral on social media: eight of out of the 11 flags that changed involving Vietnam, Singapore, Thailand, Indonesia, Myanmar, the Philippines, Cambodia and Laos. Some netizens are questioned either the mistake was "unintentionally" while considered has "put the nation to shame". The then-DG of Broadcasting, Abu Bakar Ab Rahim later admitted that the error which comes from the production stage and occurs during the live broadcast of TV2's Tamil news on Thursday and issued an apology in a segment of Tamil news a day later. Following the controversy, an officials from RTM news division has suspended for two weeks in September 2017.

=== 2019: Allegations on sabotaging the Government ===
RTM, in February 2019, was accused for allegedly sabotaging the Federal Government openly in an event held in Seremban, Negeri Sembilan. This comes after the aide to the Transport Minister, Lim Swee Kuan questioned the possibility of RTM sabotaging the government by refused to broadcast a report on its Minister, Anthony Loke a part of not reporting any news on the Menteri Besar of Negeri Sembilan, Aminuddin Harun in conjunction with the national Chinese New Year Open House celebration. Following the allegation, the Ministry of Communications and Multimedia through its Minister, Gobind Singh Deo ordered the broadcaster to provide a report pertained to the allegation.

=== 2019: Sarawak flag blunder ===
In April 2019, RTM was accused of a blundering in coverage of the 2019 Sandakan by-election by placing the Sarawakian flag instead that of Sabah flag as part of its graphic on the election.

=== 2019: Airing of Demi Tuhan Aku Bersaksi ===
A teaser for Malay telemovie Demi Tuhan Aku Bersaksi directed by Eyra Rahman and produced by Fadzil Zahari for Prokuya Studios received criticism from the public upon its release in July 2019 and accused for "intentionally disreputing tahfiz schools" further charged by transphobia ("elevates a perverse culture through a transgender's life"). Fadzil, the telemovie's producer denied any accusations over it, claiming that it "is not promoting LGBT", but it "is about a transwoman who find "repentance" in a tahfiz school" (see LGBTQ rights in Malaysia). RTM said that it had defended the telemovie over the issue and assessed that "it is laden with positive message and reflects the reality faced in Malaysian society", while it reveals that the telemovie is "under review". As a result, RTM decided to suspend the telemovie from airing for a year despite received screening approval. Originally scheduled for 2019 airing, with release date yet to be announced, Demi Tuhan Aku Bersaksi aired on TV1 on 31 October 2020.

== 2020s ==
=== 2021: Hamas as 'militant' in Mandarin news ===
On 11 May 2021, the Mandarin news segment shown on Berita RTM broadcast a report of Israel's airstrike against Palestine, which the news presenter mistakenly labelling Hamas as 'militants'. Following the incident, two RTM Mandarin news editors have been called to give an explanation and have been issued a show-cause letters. RTM later issued an apology in its Twitter account over the incident.

=== 2022: Early broadcast of Maghrib prayers' call in Tawau FM ===
In April 2022, Tawau FM, one of RTM's regional radio stations, was criticised for airing the Maghrib prayer call earlier than the scheduled local time during the first day of the Ramadan fasting month. RTM's Sabah branch later apologized over the issue.

=== 2022: Dismissal of Ridhuan Tee from Forum Perdana Ehwal Islam ===
In December 2022, preacher Ridhuan Tee was dismissed from become one of the panelists of RTM's Islamic talk show program, Forum Perdana Ehwal Islam. Ridhuan claimed that the reason for his dismissal from the show was "due to his appearances", while also stated that he was informed by the broadcaster regarding his dismissal just two days before the show's live telecast without stated the reason why RTM had to doing so.

=== 2024: Ustaz Don controversy ===
In June 2024, imam and presenter Don Daniyal Don Biyajid or Ustaz Don as he professionally known, was temporarily axed as a host of Salam Baitullah covering the year's pilgrimage following an allegation that he claimed unfoundedly that the Prophet Muhammad had supposedly proposed a woman named Ummu Hani thrice and also claimed that she was his first love. Director-General of Broadcasting, Suhaimi Sulaiman in his statement released on Twitter said that he have asked the series' production team "to take him off the programme", while tweeting: "Don't ask me about what I think or feel. Numbed". Few days later, Ustaz Don resume his duty as the Salam Baitullah host. However, the preacher was axed indefinitely from the show after he stirred another controversy where he shared a dubious (daif) hadith that supposedly said "looking at the teacher's face, is better than giving charity to 1,000 horses in the path of Allah".

=== 2024: Facebook translation error on Agong's installation ===
RTM was accused by the public for 'expressing condolences' to 17th and current Yang di-Pertuan Agong, Sultan Ibrahim in its Facebook page upon his installation on 20 July 2024. Following the controversy, the broadcaster said in its statement that it never uploaded any English content in its Facebook page while clarifying that it was an error caused by Facebook's auto-translation that deciphered the original Malay junjung kasih as 'condolences' instead of 'congratulations' in the palace register (laras bahasa istana). RTM also have made a police report over the matter and contacted Facebook's parent company, Meta Platforms to rectified the issue. Communications Minister, Fahmi Fadzil expressed his regret over some parties that criticizing RTM of making inappropriate posts in English and urged them to stop sharing the post over the translation mistake.

=== 2024: Israel vs Nepal badminton match ===
On 31 July 2024, RTM's video on demand service, RTM Klik unintentionally broadcast a men's singles badminton match involving Israel and Nepal for less than 5 minutes on the Olympic Channel 4. This came after a Facebook user complained that the broadcaster did not air Lee Zii Jia's match against the Spanish badminton player, Pablo Abian, but had instead aired the match between Israel's Misha Zilberman and Prince Dahal from Nepal. DG of Broadcasting, Suhaimi Sulaiman in his statement said that RTM had realised its mistake and promptly switched the live coverage to a handball event while said that the Israel vs Nepal match wasn't available in its playlists. Communications Minister Fahmi Fadzil later demanded RTM provide an explanation regarding the absence of live coverage of Zii Jia's final match at the 2024 Paris Olympics.

=== 2025: Cancellation of paid broadcast slot ===
On 26 September 2025, RTM faced a lawsuit by an unnamed Barisan Nasional minister over the sudden cancellation of his paid broadcast slot on 21 July. Following the cancellation, the minister also planned to initiate legal proceedings against RTM after his complaint leter to the Communications Minister, Fahmi Fadzil went unanswered.

=== 2025: ASEAN Summit name blunders ===
During the 47th ASEAN Summit on 26 October 2025, an RTM news commentator has mistakenly identified former President of Indonesia, Joko Widodo instead of its current President, Prabowo Subianto during the live coverage of the opening ceremony of the summit at the Kuala Lumpur Convention Centre. Following the incident, RTM stated that they had taken appropriate action and issued an apology to Prabowo and the Indonesian Government as well as "all parties affected by this mistake". The broadcaster also were criticized for misidentifying leaders of Singapore and Thailand during the summit's live coverage, in which RTM also issued an apology and calls for better editorial control, highlighting incompetence.

=== 2025: Santiago of the Seas censorship ===
On 16 November 2025, TV2 aired the 22nd episode of the Nickelodeon animated series Santiago of the Seas that inadvertently included a scene of two male characters, Rio and Martin, kissing; this stirred uproar among conservative viewers (see LGBTQ rights in Malaysia). Following the controversy, RTM issued a statement explained that while an internal review find there were no explicit depictions of same-sex relationships, and the decision was made to halt the series for further examination.

=== 2025: Usage of generative AI in commissioned music video ===
In November 2025, RTM produced and released a music video for a patriotic song by Stacy Anam entitled "Cinta Negara, Selamanya" ("Patriotic, Forever"); which viewers on social media noticed its visuals were artificially generated to mimic Studio Ghibli's art style and included unauthorized use of images including a selfie by Oxford botanist Chris Thorogood with a rafflesia in Indonesia; viewers derided the broadcaster for the use of generative AI as an "embarrassment to the nation".

=== 2026: Cleopatra in Space censorship ===
An episode of the animated series, Cleopatra in Space broadcast on 18 and 19 April 2026 on TV2 and sparked outrage among conservative viewers for its inadvertently queer content. Following concerns were raised over the show allegedly "linked to LGBT elements", RTM pulled out the animated series from its programming schedule while has also taken immediate action by stopping all broadcasts of the series and launched a thorough internal investigation into the show's content.

== Other controversies ==
=== Claims of political bias and censorship ===
RTM has faced prolonged allegations of favoring the ruling Barisan Nasional (BN) in its programming and news coverage. In November 2007, the then-Information Minister Zainuddin Maidin has explicitly described RTM as a government department that served as the administration's mouthpiece, while confirming perceptions of its role in promoting official narratives than independent journalism.

=== Corruption scandals ===
In 2019, three including two RTM senior officials were arrested by the Malaysian Anti-Corruption Commission due to misappropriation of money belongs to a zakat institution for the broadcaster's paid programs. They remanded for four days, but the remand custody period for two RTM senior officials were extended to five days.

On 14 November 2023, Suhaila Md Zaini, a producer of RTM's Radio News Section of the News and Current Affairs Division was charged at the Shah Alam Sessions Court for receiving RM10,000 from a company owner in 2018. Six days later, on 20 November, she was charged again for receiving RM18,000 from a 41-year-old women between 17 April and 5 June 2019. She, however, pleaded not guilty on these charges.

== See also ==
- Radio Televisyen Malaysia (RTM)
- Censorship in Malaysia
- Al Jazeera controversies
- BBC controversies
- CNN controversies
- List of The New York Times controversies
