= Sukan+ =

Malaysian TV sports channel

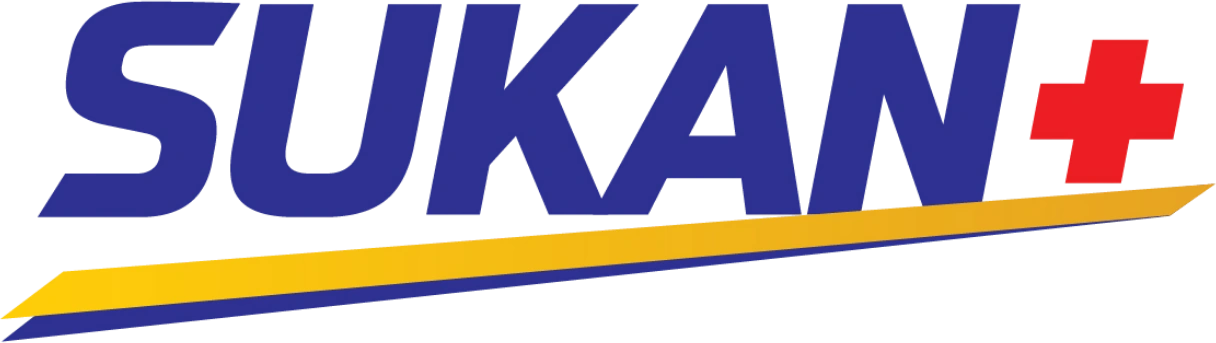
- Country: Malaysia
- Broadcast area: Malaysia; Singapore; Brunei; Thailand (South Thailand, particularly Songkhla, Narathiwat, Yala and Satun); Indonesia (West Kalimantan, North Kalimantan and Riau Islands)
- Headquarters: Angkasapuri, Kuala Lumpur, Malaysia

Programming
- Languages: Malay; English
- Picture format: 16:9 HDTV (1080i)

Ownership
- Owner: Radio Televisyen Malaysia
- Sister channels: TV1; TV2; TV Okey; Berita RTM; RTM World

History
- Launched: 13 July 2018; 8 years ago (trial broadcast); 1 April 2021; 5 years ago (official broadcast)
- Former names: RTM HD Sports (13 July 2018 - 2019); RTM Sports (2020 - 1 April 2021); Sukan RTM (1 April 2021 - 31 March 2026)

Availability

Terrestrial
- MYTV: Channel 111 (HD)

Streaming media
- RTMKlik (Malaysia Only): Watch live

Sukan+ (lit. 'Sports Plus', pronounced as Sukan Plus, formerly known as RTM HD, RTM HD Sports, RTM Sports, and Sukan RTM, stylised as SUKAN+) is a Malaysian sports channel owned and operated by Radio Televisyen Malaysia which airs local and international sports programming, with some of its programs produced and licensed by its sports division.

== History ==
In 2002, RTM announced that it would launch a specialty channel dedicated to sports and recreation, which would later become Sukan RTM.

The service was initially run as a trial from 2008, when it started during the Beijing Olympic Games and ended after the Summer Olympics finished. 10 years later, on 13 June 2018, RTM HD was officially launched as a trial broadcast exclusively on MYTV Broadcasting on channel 111. On 13 July 2018, RTM HD changed its name to RTM HD Sports as a free-to-air all-sports channel still in tests. On 1 April 2021, RTM Sports was officially rebranded and launched with the name 'Sukan RTM' during the 75th anniversary of RTM along with 60th anniversary of RTM Orchestra. Its corporate slogan, Sukan Untuk Semua (Sports For All), was introduced.

To coincide with RTM's 80th anniversary, Sukan RTM is rebranded as Sukan+.

== Programming and coverage rights ==
- Sekilas Liga

=== Current ===
==== Football ====
- FIFA
  - FIFA World Cup (Since 1974) (licensed from Astro (until 2022) and Unifi TV (from 2026)
  - 2026 FIFA World Cup qualification (AFC)
- AFC
  - AFC Asian Cup
- FAM
  - Malaysia national football team
  - Malaysia FA Cup
- MFL
  - Malaysia Super League
  - Piala Sumbangsih
  - Malaysia Cup

==== Rugby union ====
- Rugby World Cup

==== Badminton ====
- BWF
  - BWF World Tour
  - World Championships
    - Teams
      - Thomas Cup (men's championship)
      - Uber Cup (women's championship)
      - Sudirman Cup (mixed team championship)
    - Individuals
- Badminton Asia Championships (national teams (men's, women's, and mixed) and Individuals)

==== Hockey ====
- Sultan of Johor Cup

==== Mixed martial arts ====
- ONE Championship

==== Cycling ====
- Tour de Langkawi

==== Motorsport ====
- Asia Road Racing Championship
- Extreme E
- Malaysian Cub Prix
- IMSA Sportscar Championship
- MotoGP

==== Multi-sport events ====
- Commonwealth Games
- Summer Olympic Games
- Winter Olympic Games
- Asian Games
- SEA Games
- Sukma Games

=== Former rights ===
==== Football ====
===== Soccer =====
- AFF
  - ASEAN Championship (until 2025)
- UEFA
  - UEFA European Championship (until 2020)
- CONMEBOL
  - Copa América (until 2019)
- MFL
  - Malaysia Premier League (until 2018)
- Sultan of Selangor's Cup (until 2019)

==== Basketball ====
- ASEAN Basketball League (until 2018–19)

== See also ==
- TV1
- TV2
- TV Okey
- Television in Malaysia
- Radio Televisyen Malaysia
- TVRI Sport, a similar channels from TVRI
