= Radio Televisyen Malaysia =

Public broadcaster of Malaysia

- The current logo, an iteration of the 2004 logo, in use since 2021.

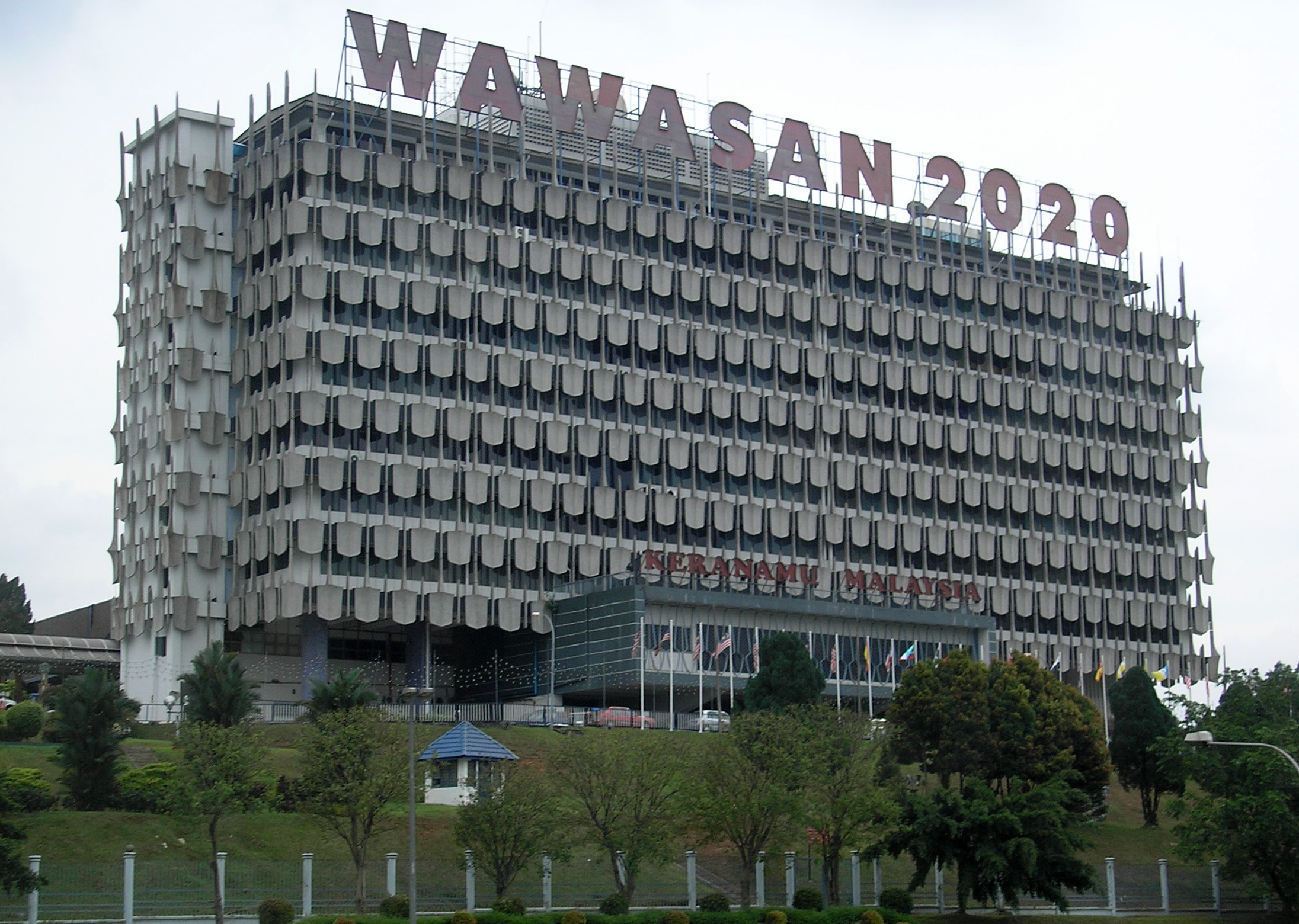
- Angkasapuri, the headquarters of RTM.
- Trade name: Department of Broadcasting, Malaysia
- Type: Government agency
- Industry: Mass media
- Predecessors: Radio Malaya (later Radio Malaysia; 1946–1969); Televisyen Malaysia (1963–1969)
- Founded: 1 April 1946; 80 years ago
- Headquarters: Angkasapuri, Kuala Lumpur, Malaysia
- Area served: Nationwide; Asia (via satellite)
- Key people: Ashwad Ismail (Director-General)
- Products: Broadcasting; web portals
- Services: Television; radio; online
- Owner: Government of Malaysia
- Number of employees: 4,000 (2021)
- Parent: Ministry of Communications Malaysia
- Website: www.rtm.gov.my

Radio Televisyen Malaysia (Note: Jawi: راديو تيليۏيشن مليسيا) (abbr. RTM stylised in all lowercase; English: Radio Television Malaysia) is the national, primary public broadcaster of Malaysia (also under the name of Malaysian Department of Broadcasting (Malay: Jabatan Penyiaran Malaysia) headquartered at Angkasapuri, Kuala Lumpur. Established on 1 April 1946 as Radio Malaya, it is the first and the oldest broadcaster in the country.

After Malaysia was formed on 16 September 1963, Radio Malaya was renamed Radio Malaysia. On 28 December that year, television service in Malaysia began with the establishment of Televisyen Malaysia. (Note: formerly Talivishen Malaysia before the 1972 spelling reform, also abbr. TV Malaysia) RTM came into its current state with its present name in 1969 when it merged its radio and television services to form the present-day broadcast department. As of 2021, RTM employs over 4,000 staff in total, of whom approximately 2,000 are in public-sector broadcasting, including part-time, flexible as well as fixed contract staff.

Its work is formerly funded principally by an annual television licence fee which is charged to all Malaysian households, companies, and organisations until the licence was phased out in 1999. RTM monopolised the free-to-air television until 1984 and also radio until 1989, when private television and radio stations such as TV3 and Best FM began operations. Currently, it operates 7 television channels and 34 radio stations nationwide as well as an over-the-top streaming service, RTMKlik. Unlike the British Broadcasting Corporation (BBC), which is a chartered corporation, RTM is a department under direct government control via a ministry.

RTM is a principal owner and operator of Orkestra RTM (English: RTM Orchestra), which was established in 1961 and touted as the oldest musical orchestra in Malaysia. News and current affairs content across all platforms is produced by its news division. RTM's digital presence, managed by its Interactive Digital Media Division, spans platforms such as Facebook, Twitter, Instagram, TikTok and YouTube. It has been listed in Triton Digital's Global Streaming Rankers for March 2025 and ranked 30th worldwide in recognition of its digital transformation. Its official YouTube channel has collectively garnered more than 250 million followers, while its Berita RTM's YouTube channel has garnered over 860 thousand subscribers as of May 2025.

Since its formation in 1946, RTM has played a prominent role in Malaysian life and culture. In 2019, RTM became the most trusted media organisation in Malaysia ahead of Astro Awani, TV3 and Malaysiakini, according to a survey by the Reuters Institute for the Study of Journalism.

RTM has often been subjected to criticism and controversy concerning its content and programming, news coverage and governance as well as corruption scandals. In the past, RTM radio stations often starts up with the interval signal.

== History ==
=== 1921–1946: The birth of local broadcasting ===
History of local broadcasting in Malaysia began in 1921 when an electrical engineer serving the Johor state government, A.L. Birch, brought the first radio set into British Malaya. He then established the Johor Wireless Association in 1923 and commenced broadcasting through 300 meter waves. Similar associations were also established in Penang (Penang Wireless Association) in 1925 and in Kuala Lumpur (Malayan Wireless Association) in 1928.

In 1930, Sir Earl from the Singapore Port Authority (now part of Maritime and Port Authority of Singapore) commenced its short wave broadcast every fortnight either on Sundays or Wednesdays. The same effort was emulated by the Malayan Wireless Association, broadcasting from Bukit Petaling, Kuala Lumpur, via 325 meter waves. Penang Wireless Association led by Khoo Sian Ewe launched Station ZHJ – Malaya's first radio station on 24 August 1934, which operates out of George Town, Penang. The British Malaya Broadcasting Corporation (BMBC) was formed on 21 July 1935 and awarded a broadcasting license by the British crown on 1 June 1936 as a radio network. On 1 March 1937, Sir Shenton Thomas opened the BMBC Studio and its transmitter at Caldecott Hill in Singapore. The corporation was taken over by the Straits Settlements Government in 1940, subsequently nationalised and reorganised as the Malaya Broadcasting Corporation and was placed under the British Department of Information.

During the World War II in 1942, the Imperial Japanese Army occupied British Malaya and used the existing radio channels in Penang, Malacca, Kuala Lumpur, Seremban and Singapore to transmit Japanese propaganda. Malaya Broadcasting Corporation was converted into the Shonan Hoso Kyoku (昭南放送協; Shōnan Broadcasting Corporation) as the imperial outpost counterpart to the Japan Broadcasting Corporation (Nippon Hoso Kyokai, NHK for short) while the Penang station was renamed Penang Hoso Kyoku (Penang Broadcasting Corporation). After the war with the British back into power reclaiming the radio infrastructure, the station was managed by the interim government – British Military Administration (BMA).

=== 1946–1969: Early history ===
On 1 April 1946, Radio Malaya or Department of Broadcasting of Malaya was established at Caldecott Hill in Singapore (Note: after Singapore out from Malaysia in 1965, the office is used by Radio Television Singapore (RTS) and its successors Singapore Broadcasting Corporation (SBC), Television Corporation of Singapore (TCS), Radio Corporation of Singapore (RCS), Singapore International Media (SIM) and Mediacorp until the end of 2017) Apart from its headquarters in Singapore, it also had broadcast stations in cities and towns across Malaya such as Penang, Kuala Lumpur, Seremban and Malacca. Radio Malaya consists of five language services – Malay, Aslian languages, English, Chinese and Tamil, the latter three became known as the Blue, Green and Red Networks in 1959. Blue, Green and Red Networks were also used to refer to regional stations, programmings and radio broadcastings were trasmitted under amplitude modulation (AM) or short and medium wave during those times.

In the British Crown Colonies of North Borneo (now Sabah) and Sarawak, Radio Sarawak was launched on 7 June 1954, while Radio Sabah was launched on 9 November 1955 after test broadcast since 1952. These two radio stations offers language services in Malay, Chinese and English, in addition to the native languages of Iban for Sarawak and Kadazan for Sabah.

With the independence of Malaya on 31 August 1957, Radio Malaya was split into two separate stations: the original studios in Singapore were taken over by a new station called Radio Singapura and Radio Malaya moved to Kuala Lumpur going on air from the new location – the 5th to 6th floor of the Federal House on 1 January 1959. It would be later renamed Radio Malaysia on 16 September 1963, with the transmissions beginning with its trademark words Inilah Radio Malaysia (This is Radio Malaysia) on the day the Malaysia of today, a federation which consists of the States of Malaya, Sabah, Sarawak and Singapore (until 1965) was born. On the same day, Radio Sabah, Radio Sarawak and Radio Singapura became part of the Radio Malaysia network as state stations for Sabah, Sarawak and Singapore listeners respectively. Radio Malaysia's flagship international shortwave radio service, Voice of Malaysia (Malay: Suara Malaysia, VOM) was launched on 15 February the same year to promote the country, with three languages in the beginning: English, Mandarin and Indonesian.

Television services under the name Talivishen Malaysia ('Malaysia Television') started on 28 December 1963 in time for the national New Year celebrations in Kuala Lumpur and regional telecasts in the Klang Valley in Selangor state, with its first studios being located in Jalan Ampang. The then 10-month-old Television Singapura (launched on 15 February 1963) became part of Televisyen Malaysia in January 1964 as its state station for Singapore viewers, a role served until 1965, when Singapore became independent. During its time as part of Malaysia, Singapore like its three other partners–Sabah, Sarawak and Malaya had its own radio network, but it was the only state to have its own television network. The state's radio and television broadcast right were included as an annex in the Malaysia Agreement, which it garnered autonomy in this area, among others.

Upon joining Radio Malaysia, Radio Sabah consisted of two language networks: the main Malay language network which later became Sabah FM and the Blue Network for Kadazan, Murut, Dusun, Bajau, English and Mandarin language which later became Sabah V FM. Radio Sarawak on the other hand, consisted of four language networks: the main Malay language network, the Blue network for Bidayuh language, the Green network for Iban and Kayan/Kenyah languages and the Red network for English, Mandarin, Bisaya and Murut language programming.

News broadcasting began on 30 December 1963 with the first television news broadcast by Televisyen Malaysia (TV Malaysia). In the beginning, TV Malaysia functioned as the official information channel of the Malaysian government and became a pioneer in news broadcasting in the country.

At that time, the news broadcast included local and international issues as well as the political, economic, and social developments of Malaysia. This news is available in 4 languages such as Malay, English, Mandarin and Tamil. It remains one of the main sources of news in Malaysia to this day.

The then-Information and Broadcasting Minister, Hamzah Abu Samah announced in May 1969 that the radio and television services would be merged to create a new public broadcasting department in August. In August 1969, he confirmed that the merger will be took place in October or will be finalised by the year-end. As part of the preparation for its merger with Radio Malaysia, Televisyen Malaysia moved from its former headquarters in Jalan Ampang to Angkasapuri.

=== 1969–2001: Merger and expansion of radio and television operations ===
Radio and Television operations merged on 11 October 1969 as the new Angkasapuri headquarters was inaugurated. Thus Radio Malaysia and Televisyen Malaysia's identities merged to become Radio Televisyen Malaysia, abbreviated as RTM. A second TV station, which was first mooted by then-Information and Broadcasting Minister, Senu Abdul Rahman, opened on 17 November in the same year as its rebranding. Despite the fact that RTM dates from the formation of the BMBC in 1936 and its current form dating from the 1969 opening of the Angkasapuri studios, it considers 1 April 1946 - the first official day of Radio Malaya - as its official birthday.

On 19 April 1971, Radio Malaysia's Malay language unit became the first radio station to broadcast 24 hours a day nationwide, thus becoming National Network (Malay: Rangkaian Nasional) in the process. On 5 November 1973, RTM launched a radio station named Radio Ibu Kota (Capital City Radio) specifically for the capital city of Kuala Lumpur. On 20 June 1975, Radio Malaysia's first Stereo FM format radio station went on the air, mainly broadcast pop music and initially focus on the Klang Valley area. On this same year, it subsumed operations of Sabah TV, an independent television broadcaster ran by Sabah's local state government through its Rangkaian Ketiga ("Third Network") connecting to Sarawak as well.

By 31 August 1978, Voice of Malaysia had expanded its broadcast to include 5 other language services namely:

- Thai (1 January 1972)
- Arabic (1 November 1972)
- Tagalog (22 October 1973)
- Malay
- Burmese

The expansion of the Voice of Malaysia was meant to foster the relationships between Malaysia & ASEAN countries of Thailand & the-then Burma, as well as fostering the Islamic fraternity between Malaysia & Arab countries. The Tagalog service was launched to cover the Southern Philippines, during the Moro conflict to support the rebels at that time. The Thai, Arabic & Burmese language services was terminated in 2009, while the Malay, English, Chinese & Indonesian language services was terminated on 31 August 2011. Tagalog service, broadcasts on MW & later FM later followed suit, terminated service on 30 April 2022, all due to low listenership & the rise of FM radio stations as well as the internet that waned it's importance.

On 17 April 1995, an international Islamic service called Voice of Islam was added to the Voice of Malaysia network and broadcasts in English as "The Voice of Islam" & in Malay as "Suara Islam". Both services then ceased to exist by 31 August 2011. All language services were transmitted from Kajang, Selangor, except for Tagalog service which was transmitted from Tuaran, Sabah.

Radio Malaysia went off the air for a few days during the recent floods.

In March 1972, RTM's television channels (known as TV Malaysia) premiered Drama Minggu Ini (This Week's Drama) – a weekly local 30-minute drama anthology and began airing monthly local hour-long dramas. In December 1972, RTM planned the start of the colour TV transition targeted to 1975, starting with foreign programmes, local programmes in colour by 1978 when colour television is extended to Sabah and Sarawak and to have TV2 in colour by 1980.

On 1 January 1974, RTM integrated with Filem Negara Malaysia to provide "more effective service to the people".

To smoothen the transition to colour television, RTM began producing documentaries in colour in mid-1978. RTM began transmission tests of colour television in early September 1978. The two outdoor broadcasting vans, imported from the United Kingdom, arrived in mid-September 1978. RTM would also air monthly live programmes in colour in 1979, aimed at a youth audience.

RTM began planning on "decentralising" television production to regional centres in Penang, Kota Bharu, Johor Bahru, Kuching and Kota Kinabalu in 1979, aiming to better highlight the problems of the people in those regions. Each centre would have a recording facility, auditorium and newsroom.

Following the construction of earth satellite stations in Beserah, Kuantan, Pahang and Kinarut, Papar, Sabah for communications and television broadcast via the Indian Ocean Intelsat III satellite, the first TV1 broadcasts in the Bornean states of Sabah and Sarawak were held on 30 August 1975 (just in time for the 18th anniversary of Hari Merdeka). RTM began broadcasting in colour since 28 December 1978 in Peninsular Malaysia - as part of its 15th anniversary - and 31 August 1980 in East Malaysia. TV1 was the first channel to broadcast in colour, with TV2 following suit with the switch occurring on 7 May 1979. TV2 made its debut in East Malaysia on 31 August 1983 and Rangkaian Ketiga ceased transmissions mid-1985 afterwards. Between 1972 and 1999, Televisyen Malaysia shared time with TV Pendidikan – the national education channel in the daytime. TV1 introduced daytime transmissions on 1 March 1994, TV Pendidikan switched channels from TV1 to TV2 as the latter introduced its own daytime transmissions in 2000.

In February 1980, the broadcaster allows any Malaysians to appear in its ads under the new code for advertisements. Effective March 15, adverts depicted alcoholic beverages and any liquor products was banned from airing on RTM. Voice of Malaysia extended its reach to Indochina countries, Japan and Europe in May. In June, RTM prohibited non-Malaysians or Caucasians and their voices from appeared in its ads.

In 1981, under the Fourth Malaysia Plan, RTM was allocated RM 120 million to improve its services. As part of its plans to increase production of more colour programming, RTM planned to decentralize scripted content production from its main studios by using Filem Negara Malaysia's soundstages which would be converted by 1981 for use by the network.

In early 1982, RTM's Berita RTM Malay language newscast had its main edition moved to 9pm weekdays. In 1982, a viewer preference survey reported that viewers in Johor prefer to watch RTM's Malay programmes than its news programmes, which "still lacks professionalism". Meanwhile, Malay viewers in Singapore were satisfied with entertainment programmes provided by RTM compared to Singapore's SBC 5 Malay-language offerings. Advertising on RTM as of 1982 was up to five minutes an hour on television and seven minutes on radio. At that time RTM only air commercials between programmes. In mid-1982, RTM began allowing private companies to sponsor feature films showings. RTM began introducing a new format for its television news broadcasts on 18 October 1982, introducing a two-newscaster format for all languages, aiming at improving news presentation.

RTM had problems acquiring old Malay films from Cathay Organisation and Malay Film Productions in 1983 due to "prohibitive price tags".

While RTM had used to one advertiser sponsoring programmes, it planned to introduce "multiple-sponsorship" sometime in 1984, where one or more advertisers sponsor a programme. In February 1984, RTM's television channels began to air a digital time display which appear at the bottom-left of the screen. RTM's news division was reorganised in 1984. It also had plans to give journalism training for its staff, sending them to the United States.

In August, it also partnered with Filem Negara Malaysia and the Information Department to produce "short and easy-to-understand" documentaries on Government policies.

RTM was still airing operas for the minority of its viewers in 1985. Drama Swasta, a slot for drama productions produced by private companies for RTM airing Monday nights, premiered in 1985. The slot is aimed to revive the then-ailing local film industry.

In a viewership study carried by Survey Research Malaysia in September and October 1985, RTM's entertainment programmes made to the top 10 shows thanks to the position of being aired at 8:30 pm where viewers were mostly at home. Notably, the Malay movies slot was in the first place of the top 10 list with 3.754 million viewers. The number of viewers of RTM's television channels were 4.197 million in September and 4.563 million in October respectively. Plans for FM mono transmissions in Sabah and Sabah were considered in late 1985. Due to the launch of TV3, RTM lost RM 5 million and RM 11 million in advertising revenue for 1984 and 1985 respectively. Plans to privatise RTM's advertising division in 1986 were in the works, where the Information Ministry would appoint an agency to handle RTM's advertising system.

In August 1986, RTM decided to buy RM4.5 million worth of satellite receiving equipment, drafted in the amendment of the then-Broadcast Act. At that time, RTM was using the Telecom Departments' satellite receiving equipments where it had to pay RM1.7 million annually to the Telecom Department. The satellite facilities finally enabled better nationwide broadcasts of its programming. By the time, the amount of local programming aired on RTM's TV1 and TV2 in 1986 was at 65%.

RTM reformatted its news programming by mid-1987 resulting in a new look for its newscasts with the debut of national and international news bulletins. In addition, RTM launched Berita Wilayah - a brand new regional newscast with updates from RTM's regional studios everyday of the week. On 14 June 1987, RTM slightly reduced the broadcasting hours of its television channels, particularly removing the midnight movie slot, saving the broadcaster about RM 2 million a year. Over 200 million people tuned in to RTM's broadcasts in ASEAN countries in 1987. RTM's Voice of Malaysia shortwave broadcasts were upgraded in 1987. In late 1987, RTM began airing local drama and comedy productions produced on videotape instead of film to reduce the high costs of film productions and the then-current limited film market.

Realizing that SBC 8 in Singapore had been successfully beaming Tamil language drama programs to Malaysia, in response the network began producing locally produced Tamil dramas on RTM2 in 1988 as an effort to increase its Tamil programming, despite the lack of advertisers and sponsors for such. RTM spent RM 12 million in upgrading FM stereo radio broadcasts in 1988. It also had plans have other languages broadcast in FM in the near future. On 11 September 1988, RTM aired the 1988 Sport Aid, consisting of a 24-hour telethon starting at 7 am, a marathon event (Sport Aid Malaysian run and Race Against Time run) and the First World Carnival charity concert at 12 am. RTM contributed 15 minutes of the charity concert coverage and 7 minutes of marathon footage for the worldwide Race Against Time broadcast through a satellite link to London. RTM aired the 1988 Summer Olympics through its two television channels, with TV2 taking the morning and afternoon coverage from 7 am to 5:30 pm and TV1 airing the main events at 7 pm. Evening summaries which consist of delayed broadcasts were aired at 8:30 pm. The earth-satellite complex in Angkasapuri opened on 17 December 1988, costing RM 3 million. It marked the start of RTM's entry into "direct satellite broadcasting".

The advertising revenue for RTM in 1987 was at RM 57 million, becoming RM 60 million in 1988 and increasing to RM 140 million in 1989 after outsourcing their advertising sales to GT Consultants.

In April 1989, the government approved a project to improve television and radio broadcasts, set to be handled by Transponder Services Sdn Bhd. The project, which cost RM 50 million and planned to start in phases from next year, involved setting up parabolic antennas to feed radio and television broadcasts, including RTM's two television channels. The project would be completed in phases starting in mid-1990.

Radio 4, 5 and 6 began broadcasting 18 hours a day instead of 10 hours in 1990. In January 1990, RTM was working on an agreement to supply news footage to CNN and One World Channel. It was later finalized. It would renew the contract with the former in July 1994 for another three years, allowing RTM to remove material not for local broadcast. Three months later, in April, it began collaborated with TV3 for the broadcast of Mandarin news. However, it did not imposed any payments for the service. As of 1990, RTM's television channels were being seen through the Palapa satellite, reaching viewers in Asean countries, Papua New Guinea and Australia. In 1990, RTM was having problems recruiting staff who are proficient in Mandarin for Radio 5 and TV2 due to a lack of suitable candidates, and had resorted to use part-timers.

RTM had plans to transform itself into a corporation, first in 1983, and later revived in 1989, aimed to enhance its "effectiveness in nation-building". A cabinet proposal was presented in 1989. It was also going to conduct studies through an "independent party", completed around August 1991. RTM was planned to be privatised in stages in 1993, going under the name Penyiaran Nasional (PEN) and to be established on 1 September 1993. The plan was scrapped in March 1993, to "maintain contact with the people" and continue to spread "government information". However, RTM revived the plan again in late 1997, "to maintain ratings" of its television channels. It may also look to go corporatised and later privatised.

RTM's gross advertising revenue in 1991 was around RM 200 million; by this time RTM was able to become self-sufficient and no longer rely on government funds.

RTM decided to ban TV programmes and songs which contains influences from controversial religious sect, Al-Arqam in September 1991. Information Minister, Mohamed Rahmat also ordered the broadcaster to destroy all Al-Arqam-related materials.

RTM introduced a new service called Subscription News Service (SNS) which provides information and entertainment news in 1991.

As part of the expansion of Radio 3, a mobile radio station was set up during the Information Ministry's Family Day held on 29 December 1991, with mobile radio stations planned to be added in more states later.

In 1992, RTM ruled that it would not air advertisements which contains offensive messages that could "violate the norms and culture of Malaysian society". Also in the same year, the amount of local programming on RTM's TV1 was at 80%, with TV2 at 35%. The former had achieved the government's target of 80% locally produced content by the year 2000.

In July 1992, RTM announced that it will introduce different formats for its television channels, catering to its viewer's taste. The news formats would be different as well.

RTM's five radio stations across Malaysia began to broadcast in FM in late 1992, in an effort to refrain Malaysians living in border areas from listening to radio broadcasts from neighbouring countries. Radio transmitters would also be replaced.

On 1 December 1992, RTM made a major reshuffle which involves 23 of its senior officials as a preparation to be corporatized.

In 1993, the prime time slots on TV1 and TV2 were extended to 11:30 pm in stages instead of 7 pm to 10 pm.

In January 1993, RTM generated revenues of RM257.4 million in total from radio and TV adverts throughout 1992. It also ruled that it would not prioritised international programming and focused on local content instead.

The then-Information Minister, Mohamed Rahmat said that there will be the major revamp on his ministry's senior officials on 4 February 1993, while stating that about 80% of RTM's employees will transferred into the new entity when RTM will privatized as Penyiaran Nasional in September.

The broadcaster began to given the rights by the Government to manage its own financial systems in March.

RTM restructured and reorganized program schedule for its television and radio stations gradually in mid-April 1993. At the same time, RTM was in talks with the French broadcasting corporation, Canal France International Broadcasting (CFI) to expand their broadcasting partnership internationally.

In May 1993, RTM planned to prioritise airing of films with positive moral values. It already has a rule to stop broadcasting films that contain sex and violence. RTM also decided to reduce the airplay of rock and rap songs which it considers to be "street culture".

Apart from its headquarters at Angkasapuri, RTM has branches in every state of Malaysia (except Selangor which is based in Angkasapuri) and the Federal Territory of Labuan. In addition to managing radio stations, RTM state branches also produced shows and news content for television broadcast. The Peninsular States began to have their own state radio stations by the early 1990s, with Perlis being the last to do so on 1 June 1991. In East Malaysia, the territorial radio station of Labuan was established on 31 August 1986. RTM began to gradually replace Amplitude Modulation broadcast with Frequency Modulation broadcast since the 1980s (a process which still continue to this day) and adopted numbering system for its Radio Stations in 1993. The names of the radio stations were as follows:

- Radio 1 Malay language service
- Radio 2 Music service, rebranded from Stereo FM.
- Radio 3 Local services, with the name format of Radio 3/Radio Malaysia followed by place name in Malay language.
- Radio 4 English language service
- Radio 5 Chinese language service
- Radio 6 Tamil language service
- Radio 7 Aslian language service

Traditional Malay Music Radio (Malay: Radio Irama Melayu Asli, RiMA), precursor of present-day Radio Klasik began broadcast on 11 March 1998.

In August 1993, RTM planned to add three broadcast transmissions from its overseas SNS service by 1994.

RTM was responsible for the Highway Radio project along with local private company Time Engineering in 1993. Both parties were also responsible for Radio Tourism, a temporary radio station based in Langkawi which would be launched in November 1993 for the Visit Malaysia Year 1994. A science and technology radio, Radio Teknologi, was planned to start in 1994.

As of 1993, RTM's overseas service Voice of Malaysia broadcast in Malay, English, Indonesian, Thai, Myanmar, Tagalog, Mandarin and Arabic, with plans to start broadcasting in Japanese, Khmer, Vietnamese and Lao.

In March 1994, RTM partnered with state-owned oil and gas conglomerate Petronas to produce a special radio programme titled Memandu Bersama Petronas (Driving With Petronas), which aired on four RTM radio stations. The programme provides tips and reminder to listeners on road safety.

RTM ended the BBC World Service Television news broadcast in May 1994, with the BBC demanding that it would stop supplying their content to Malaysia and should air their content without cuts. RTM decided that it will seek other news providers, including CNN and ABU.

RTM and TV3 in August 1994 were ordered by the Information Minister, Mohamed Rahmat to banned khunsa (a person who have both male and female genitals) and pondan (a men who resembles a women) from appeared in any of its programs. The ban was made to avoid the local communities were "influenced by bad culture practiced by the Western communities".

In November 1994, RTM was ordered by the Ministry of Information to setup the Television Detector Unit to oversee all contents in satellite television in Asia. The broadcaster began to gives priority to the then-Prime Minister, Mahathir Mohamad in its news coverage in December 1994.

RTM introduced sign language in its television news broadcasts in late 1995. RTM had attempted sign language broadcasts in 1990 but ended due to "a lack of skilled people".

The RTMNet website was launched on 27 December 1995, becoming the first broadcaster in Asia to broadcast over the internet with six national radio stations streaming over the service. It would also become the first broadcaster in Asia to stream the Budget on the internet on 25 October 1996, partnering with local computer company MCSB Systems.

The gross revenue for TV1 and TV2 in 1996 was reported to be at RM 57 million.

RTM planned to start an "information radio" station set to launch in 1996, using the broadcast spaces of Radio 7. The station was given the name "Radio Penerangan", launching on 25 September 1997 and air for eight hours a day in the Klang Valley area. Other radio stations planned include RiMA, then only described as a "24 hour" "Malay traditional music and songs" radio station, Radio Konsumer, a consumer radio, Radio Wanita, a women's radio and a tourist radio station for Langkawi.

In June 1996, RTM intended to open a broadcasting museum in Malacca, which was to be the first of its kind in Malaysia, in collaboration with the Malacca State Government. However, for unknown reasons, the plan was abandoned. RTM also collected a gross revenue of RM366 million from radio and TV advertising with a 300% of increase.

RTM began transmitting from the Kuala Lumpur Tower in August 1996.

In December 1996, RTM acquired 60% of its programming content from Bumiputera production companies that registered with the Federal Treasury, which was welcomed by local film producers.

In March 1997, RTM negotiated a partnership with several private companies to add its terrestrial channels, TV1 and TV2 on its official website. Later, in August, RTM improved its payment procedures to TV producers, to avoid them having financial difficulties.

RTM began broadcasting its Malay and English Suara Islam radio to Malaysian listeners in late 1997. Plans for the launch began in 1995. In August, the broadcaster had plans to use technical and production expertise from TV New Zealand to upgrade its services.

In December 1997, RTM reduced its annual spending on programmes by 20% due to the then-ongoing financial crisis. RTM began collaborating with the Malaysia Crime Prevention Foundation (MCPF) in 1998 to telecast crime prevention slogans via TV1 and TV2.

It was announced in 1999 that RTM will be corporatized on what would have been its 55th anniversary in April 2001 in order to "disseminate information and knowledge about government policies in an effort to create an informed society". However, for unknown reasons, the plan was later scrapped again. In June, RTM expand the running time for its primetime news broadcast from half an hour to 45 minutes.

In February 2000, RTM banned programmes and dramas that using Bahasa Rojak, a mixture language between Malay and English, from airing on its radio and television services after the Information Ministry expressed its concern that its widespread usage could dwarfed Bahasa Malaysia as the official language of Malaysia. The decision received positive feedback from many parties.

In October 2000, RTM signs a memorandum of understanding (MoU) agreement with Japanese broadcasting company, Fuji Television for the TV programs and news exchanges.

RTM announced in January 2001 that it would reduce broadcast time for entertainment programs from 50 to 42 hours while broadcast time for Islamic-themed programs - either network-produced or as blocktimers - would be the reverse of the former with an increase from 42 hours to 50. In February, the broadcaster began to air more TV programmes on ICT.

=== 2001–2015: Rebranding and transformation ===
On 1 April 2001, RTM reorganized and restructured scheduling time for TV1 and TV2 to adapt with current situation. It also planned to introduced a new formula to allocate broadcast time to 54 production companies by 2002.

In 2002, RTM planned to launch two more channels, as TV1 and TV2 could not accommodate its ever-increasing programming. It also announced that it would launch a specialty channel dedicated to sports and recreation, which would later become Sukan RTM. RTM also planned to produce a special programs on English learning in order to increased knowledge of English as the country's second language.

In 2003, RTM revived its corporatization plan and expected to be corporatized as Radio Televisyen Malaysia Berhad (RTMB) with the name and logo change took effect in March, but later postponed to June and August. However, the plan was abolished as RTM remains a government-owned.

RTM allocated RM385 million and the addition of 1,659 staffs to upgrade its radio and television services in April 2004.

In June 2004, RTM reorganised its broadcast operations, in line with "fast, precise and compact" concept.

By July, RTM announced that it would expand its broadcast operations overseas in the future. This came after the Information Ministry have managed several technical matters. It also set out its target to air 60% of local content and more imported programs by 2005.

RTM signed a memorandum of understanding (MoU) with MiTV Corporation in February 2005 in which the latter agreed to aired RTM's programs on its platform.

In conjunction with its 59th anniversary on 1 April 2005, RTM's radio stations underwent rebranding and renaming.

- Radio 1 Malay language service was rebranded as Nasional FM.
- Radio 2 Music service was rebranded as Muzik FM.
- Most Radio 3 Local service radio stations adopted names based on place names in Malay language followed by FM. Sabah's non-Malay language service was rebranded as Sabah V FM, while Sarawak's English-Chinese bilingual station and indigenous language station were rebranded as Red FM and Wai FM respectively.
- Radio 4 English language service was rebranded as Traxx FM.
- Radio 5 Chinese language service was rebranded as Ai FM.
- Radio 6 Tamil language service was rebranded as Minnal FM.
- Radio 7 Aslian language service was rebranded as Asyik FM.
- Traditional Malay Music service was rebranded as Klasik FM.

RTM began to ban advertisements deemed sexually charged and "Western influences that does not reflect on Malaysian values" from airing on TV1 and TV2 in June 2005.

Following its rebranding exercise, RTM's ads revenue for the first 10 months of 2005 decreased by 10% to almost RM60 million. The broadcaster signed a contract with Telekom Malaysia on 26 January 2006 in which the latter provide a network and maintenance service for RM150 million over three years.

On 1 April 2006, in conjunction with its 60th anniversary, RTM began its non-stop broadcast for 60 hours and airs programs in selected locations on its radio and TV networks.

On 12 August 2006, Nasional FM merged with Klasik FM to form Klasik Nasional FM, and broadcast classical Malay music together with its main program 24 hours a day. However, the merger survived for only five years, as the station began losing listeners to sister stations and private competitors such as Hot FM, Sinar FM and Era FM, as well as then-upstart Bernama's Radio24 which took over the frequencies of Klasik FM. Thus, Klasik Nasional was demerged on 4 January 2012 at midnight and split into the original two radio stations, with Nasional FM using the same frequencies as the former Muzik FM (discontinued in late 2012) and Klasik Nasional became Radio Klasik. Owing to the diminished effectiveness of a shortwave radio service over time with changing technology and media consumption habits, Voice of Malaysia was dissolved on 31 August 2011. Prior to this, the Arab, Burmese and Thai language services ceased broadcast by 1 May 2009.

In September 2006, RTM implemented trial period of digital broadcasting, which lasted for six months.

In 2007, RTM dominated 17% of television viewership market in Malaysia, after Media Prima (54%) and Astro (29%).

In 2008, RTM through its two free-to-air channels, TV1 and TV2 gained the increasing of viewership ratings and revenue in the last six months. It also launch a global television channel that caters to the Malaysian diaspora worldwide, named RTM World and set to begin broadcast in April 2008. However, for unknown reasons, the plan to launch the channel was cancelled.

In August, RTM in partnership with the Indonesian broadcaster, TVRI to merge their respective news bulletins known as Warta Serumpun.

In September in the same year, following the restructuring of its operations, RTM planned to incorporated digital broadcasting system entirely within three years. In December, RTM considers its idea to setup the new channel that focuses on the live broadcasts of Parliament conferences, which later became RTM Parlimen. Later, RTM launched a Disaster Unit to broadcast and gathers news reports related to disasters through its radio and TV stations.

In January 2009, RTM restructured contents on its two main terrestrial channels, TV1 and TV2. Two months later, in March, RTM planned to developed five new channels as part of its effort to pivot towards digital broadcasting by 2015.

In 2010, RTM was in talks with Media Prima to working on several areas, which includes news exchange and joint production.

In 2011, RTM began collaborating with the Dewan Bahasa dan Pustaka (DBP) to launch the proper usage of national languages drive which to be aired on its radio stations, including Klasik Nasional and Ai FM.

TV1 broadcast overnight many times since the early 1990s, but daily 24-hour transmissions did not come until 2003, which was later cancelled. Permanent 24-hour broadcasting was introduced on 3 April 2006 on TV2 and on 21 August 2012 on TV1.

On 28 December 2013, RTM celebrated 50th anniversary of television in Malaysia.

In 2014, RTM planned to launch a free-to-air children's television channel which targeted to preschoolers and older children. However, for unknown reasons, the plan was abandoned. It also collaborated with the New Straits Times Press (NSTP) for idea sharing and expertise in mass media.

=== 2015–present: Transition to digital ===
In 2015, RTM implementated a transformation program through the implementation of its strategic initiatives. The broadcaster also had plan to launch its own TV news channel, which eventually become Berita RTM.

In 2018, it was announced that RTM and Bernama would merge to form a standalone public broadcasting corporation as part of the government's efforts to reduce operation costs. However, the merger plan was abandoned.

On 1 April 2019, RTM launches a visual radio, collectively known as Conty News in conjunction with its 73rd anniversary.

In November the same year, the Ministry of Communications and Multimedia announced that it would introduce a new channel through RTM, with programs on these channels being documentaries that would provide information to the public.

Three new TV channels were launched during the digital television broadcasting era: TV Okey on 21 March 2018, news channel Berita RTM on 25 June 2020 and sports channel Sukan RTM on 1 April 2021. TV Pendidikan returned to RTM on 6 April 2020 and began to air on TV Okey.

On 1 April 2021, RTM celebrates its 75th anniversary and unveils its new corporate logo. A special stamp was launched in collaboration between RTM and Pos Malaysia to commemorate with the broadcaster's 75th anniversary. The broadcaster also held a 3D virtual exhibition to engage with its viewers.

On the midnight of 30 April 2022, the Voice of Malaysia's Tagalog service ceased broadcasting after nearly 50 years.

Upon its 77th anniversary in April 2023, RTM implemented two main plans, namely the 2021–2025 Strategic Plan and the 2021–2023 Transformation Plan which involving four pillars.

In November 2023, RTM signed an MoU agreement with the Indian public broadcaster, Prasar Bharati during the 6th India-Malaysia Joint Commission Meeting (JCM) in New Delhi, India. The MoU was approved by the Indian cabinet.

The broadcaster combined its 34 radio networks in a special radio show, entitled 34 Je - Kita Suka, which began live broadcast for the first time on Nasional FM on 6 January 2024. The radio show's title was derived from RTM's radio service slogan, "34 Stesen Radio, Satu Suara".

In May 2024, RTM and satellite TV provider, Astro were partnered to envisioned an initiative in support to Palestine by launching Malaysia4Palestine, a special channel dedicated to highlighting the humanitarian crisis in Palestine in the wake of the ongoing Gaza war. The channel began one-day broadcasting on 25 May 2024. Among artistes who involved in the project were Siti Nurhaliza, M. Nasir, Syafinaz Selamat, Alif Satar, Soo Wincci, Sarimah Ibrahim, Aznil Nawawi and Wani Kayrie.

In August, the broadcaster began to utilise the artificial intelligence (AI) technology on its news production, awhile at the same time, it collaborated with Digital Nasional through a proof of concept (PoC) to utilised 5G network technology in its broadcast operations.

In October, RTM has appointed as the official broadcaster for the 2025 ASEAN Summit. The broadcaster began collaborating with Universiti Malaysia Terengganu (UMT) in November 2024 to empowering the Science, Technology, Engineering and Mathematics (STEM) digital contents to Malaysian community.

In February 2025, the broadcaster introduces a new audio platform, known as the Galaksi 34, which utilising the Metaverse technology for all of its 34 radio stations to expand outreach to its listeners.

In May 2025, Communications Minister, Fahmi Fadzil announced that the RTM's broadcasting complex in Langkawi, Kedah, which was completed in September and its operations would be relocated to the new premise from the Tabung Haji-owned premises, where it had occupied since 1995. However, the new facility is yet to launched and began operations.

RTM announced in November that all of its 34 radio stations will implement a Radio Automation System (RAS) by 2028. The first radio station under RTM to utilise the RAS project was Kelantan FM, which adopted the RAS in July 2025, costing RM8.84 miliion.

On 5 March 2026, RTM inked a strategic collaboration with the Hong Kong public broadcaster, RTHK, to focused on content co-production. The collaboration also involves program sharing and drama professional talents exchange between both broadcasters.

On 1 April, RTM celebrates its 80th anniversary. Later, the broadcaster inked a collaboration with the Austrian broadcaster, Österreichischer Rundfunk (ORF) to expand the access of information and technology.

The broadcster along with Unifi TV secured rights as the official broadcaster of the 2026 World Cup in May.

On 26 June, RTM expands partnership with Astro "to widen access to quality content across multiple broadcasting platforms". The expanded collaboration would see RTM channels to be available on Astro again very soon, including Sukan+, Berita RTM and RTM's radio networks.

By July, the broadcaster began implement strict SOPs to filter LGBT content across all of its media platforms to ensure all contents adhere the guidelines.

== Governance and structure ==
RTM is a broadcast department with a direct government control under pursuant to the Ministry of Communications, with its operations and activities being overseen and regulated by its Director-General of Broadcasting through its Broadcasting Ethical Code. The Director-General is Ashwad Ismail.

Unlike the BBC, ABC, KBS and NHK, which is funded by television licence fees, RTM previously have been funded publicly through funds obtained from television licensing and after the abolishment of TV licensing fees in Malaysia in 1999, it has been subsidized by the Government and taxpayers.

In 1983, the 'Towards the National Communications Policy' symposium evaluated that RTM should become an "independent corporation", in order to become "a truly influential, trusted and comprehensive media".

=== Director-General of Broadcasting ===
Name	Term of office
H.W. Jackson	1946–1955
David Little	1955–1959
Albert Read	1959–1969
Dol Ramli	1969–1975
Abdullah Mohamad	1975–1986
Zain Mahmood	1986–1987
Jaafar Kamin	1988–1999
Ali Musa Sulaiman	1999–2003
Abd Rahman Hamid	2003–2009
Ibrahim bin Yahya	2009–2011
Norhyati Ismail	2011–2014
Abu Bakar Ab. Rahim	2014–2018
Abdul Muis Shefii	2018–2019
Nor Yahati Awang	2020–2021
Ruzain Idris	2021–2022
Che Roslan Che Daud	2022–2023
Suhaimi Sulaiman	2023–2026
Ashwad Ismail	2026–present

=== Board members ===
As of 2026, the board members of RTM are:

Name	Position
Sharifah Adlina binti Syed Abdullah	Deputy Director-General of Broadcasting (Strategic)
Khairim Shahril Mat Khalid	Director of Management Service Division
Saifuzzaman Yusop	Director of Radio Programme Division
Abdull Hadi Mohd Yusoff	Director of Television Programme Division
Ahmad Afandi Abu Hasim	Director of Multichannel Network Control and Broadcast Centre Division
Ismail Sulaiman	Director of Technical Service Division
Mokhzani Ismail	Director of Music Service Division
Ismail Seman	Director of Facility Development Division
Sharimah Abu Bakar	Director of Production Technology Division
Kamal Roslim	Director of Marketing and Promotion Division
Nor Sanusre Ramli	Director of Public Relations Division
Ivan Toh Swee Ming	Director of Interactive Digital Media Division
Azura Mohamed Yusof	Head of Integrity Unit

However, as of 2024, the Director of Strategic Development Division, Director of News and Current Affairs Division and Deputy Director-General (Broadcast Operations) posts is vacant.

=== State directors ===
The state directors of RTM were responsible for the daily operations of the broadcaster's branch in every states of Malaysia. As of 2024, the state directors are:

Name	Position
Noriza Salleh	Director of RTM Selangor
Azman Hashim	Director of RTM Johor
Salmah Hashim	Director of RTM Sabah
Wan Azhan Wan Hamat	Director of RTM Sarawak
Nur Hafizoh Idris	Director of RTM Kedah
Sabri Mansor	Director of RTM Terengganu
Shaheezam Said	Director of RTM Kelantan
Fathilhidayat Ghazali	Director of RTM Perlis
Arifin Awang	Director of RTM Pahang
Suhana Suratman	Director of RTM Negeri Sembilan
Siti Nurbaini Khairi	Director of RTM Malacca
Nor Hisham Abbas	Director of RTM Penang
Karim Sadiran	Director of RTM Perak

However, as of 2024, the director posts of RTM in Labuan and Langkawi were vacant.

=== Divisions and units ===
RTM has the following in-house divisions and units covering its output and operations:

- News and Current Affairs, responsible for the gathering and broadcasting of news and current affairs.
- TV Drama, responsible for commission and production of television dramas and telemovies.
- Entertainment, responsible for commission and production of entertainment programmes and variety shows.
- Magazine and TV Documentary, responsible for commission and production of documentary series and magazine programmes.

Other divisions and units operated within RTM including the Psychology Unit, which provides psychological, counselling and therapy sessions as well as healthcare services for its staffs.

== Properties and facilities ==
=== Headquarters and branch offices ===
RTM headquarters and branch offices

Name	Location	Television services	Radio services	Other
Angkasapuri	Kuala Lumpur	TV1, TV2, TV Okey, Sukan+, Berita RTM	Nasional FM, KL FM, Selangor FM, TraXX FM, Ai FM, Minnal FM, Asyik FM, Radio Klasik	Headquarters of RTM, Asia-Pacific Broadcasting Union (ABU), Tun Abdul Razak Institute for Broadcasting and Information (IPPTAR) and Selangor State Broadcasting Department (RTM Selangor). It houses RTM's Radio, Television and News divisions and main TV Show and News production studios.
Tuanku Syed Putra Broadcasting Complex	Kangar, Perlis		Perlis FM	Perlis branch office (RTM Perlis).
Sultan Abdul Halim Information and Broadcasting Complex	Alor Setar, Kedah		Kedah FM	Kedah State main office (RTM Kedah). Also known by address: Jalan Kuala Kedah.
Kuah Tabung Haji Building	Langkawi, Kedah		Langkawi FM	Langkawi branch office (RTM Langkawi).
Penang State Broadcasting Department	George Town, Penang		Mutiara FM	Penang branch office (RTM Penang). Also known by address: Jalan Burma (Burmah Road).
Sultan Nazrin Muizzuddin Shah Complex	Ipoh, Perak		Perak FM	Perak branch office (RTM Perak). Also known by address: Jalan Raja Musa Mahadi (formerly Dairy Road).
Kelantan State Broadcasting Department	Kota Bharu, Kelantan		Kelantan FM	Kelantan branch office (RTM Kelantan). Located in Wakaf Che Yeh Suburb. Site of Kelantan FM transmitter.
Terengganu State Broadcasting Department	Kuala Terengganu, Terengganu		Terengganu FM	Terengganu branch office (RTM Terengganu).
Sultan Haji Ahmad Shah Broadcasting Complex	Kuantan, Pahang		Pahang FM	Pahang branch office (RTM Pahang).
Tuanku Muhammad Broadcasting Complex	Seremban, Negeri Sembilan		Negeri FM	Negeri Sembilan branch office (RTM Negeri Sembilan).
Malacca State Broadcasting Department	Malacca City, Malacca		Melaka FM	Malacca branch office (RTM Malacca). Also known by address: Jalan Taming Sari.
Sultan Iskandar Information and Broadcasting Complex	Johor Bahru, Johor		Johor FM	Johor branch office (RTM Johor). Also known by address: Jalan Tasek Utara.
Kuching RTM Building	Kuching, Sarawak	TV Okey	Sarawak FM, Red FM, Wai FM Iban, Wai FM Bidayuh	Sarawak State main office (RTM Sarawak). It houses the state's TV Show and News production studios. Also known by address: Jalan P. Ramlee.
Sri Aman Broadcasting Department	Simanggang, Sarawak		Sri Aman FM	Sri Aman branch office (RTM Sri Aman).
Sibu Broadcasting Department	Sibu, Sarawak		Sibu FM	Sibu branch office (RTM Sibu). Also known by address: Jalan Abang Haji Openg.
Old Bintulu Development Authority Building	Bintulu, Sarawak		Bintulu FM	Bintulu branch office (RTM Bintulu).
Miri Broadcasting Department	Miri, Sarawak		Miri FM	Miri branch office (RTM Miri).
Limbang Broadcasting Department	Limbang, Sarawak		Limbang FM	Limbang branch office (RTM Limbang).
Labuan Broadcasting Department	Labuan		Labuan FM	Labuan branch office (RTM Labuan). Also known by address: Jalan Tanjung Taras.
Ministry of Communications and Multimedia Integrated Complex	Kota Kinabalu, Sabah	TV Okey	Sabah FM, Sabah V FM	Sabah State main office (RTM Sabah). It houses the state's TV Show and News production studios. Located in Kepayan suburb along Jalan Lintas.
Keningau Federal House	Keningau, Sabah		Keningau FM	Keningau branch office (RTM Keningau).
Sandakan Federal Building	Sandakan, Sabah		Sandakan FM	Sandakan branch office (RTM Sandakan).
Tawau Broadcasting Department	Tawau, Sabah		Tawau FM	Tawau branch office (RTM Tawau). Also known by address: Jalan Chong Thien Vun.

=== Local stations ===
List of RTM local stations by establishment date
No.	Name	Establishment date	Notes
1	Penang	1 April 1946	The first branch station of RTM. Initially headquartered at Chinese Recreational Club, it moved to United Engineers Building at Bishop Street in 1948, the Sepoy Lines Road in 1955 and the present building at Burmah Road in 1961, which was opened on 30 October 1965.
2	Malacca	1 April 1946	The second branch station of RTM. Initially stationed at the Stadthuys, it moved to a wooden building in Downtown Malacca in 1948 and the present building at Jalan Mata Kuching (now Jalan Taming Sari) in 1961, which was opened on 17 August 1965.
3	Sarawak	7 June 1954	The first and main station of Sarawak and the first station in East Malaysia.
4	Sabah	9 November 1955	The first and main station of Sabah and the second station in East Malaysia. Initially headquartered at Brace Hill in Kota Kinabalu, it moved to Wisma Radio at KM 2.4 Jalan Tuaran in 1963, and later the Ministry of Communications Complex in 2012.
5	Kelantan	16 November 1963	
6	Johor	4 June 1966	
7	Perak	13 May 1967	
8	Pahang	10 February 1968	
9	(Sarawak) Limbang	17 April 1971	The second station in Sarawak.
10	Terengganu	1 March 1973	
11	(Sarawak) Sibu	7 December 1974	The third station in Sarawak.
12	(Sarawak) Miri	2 September 1975	The fourth station in Sarawak.
13	Kedah	31 August 1979	The first and main station of Kedah. Initially housed at Alor Setar Federal House, it moved to the Sultan Abdul Halim Information and Broadcasting Complex in 1992.
14	(Sarawak) Sri Aman	21 October 1982	The fifth station in Sarawak.
15	Labuan	31 August 1986	
16	(Sabah) Tawau	31 August 1987	The second station in Sabah.
17	Negeri Sembilan	16 August 1990	
18	Selangor	16 August 1990	
19	Perlis	1 June 1991	
20	(Sabah) Sandakan	5 January 1992	The third station in Sabah.
21	(Kedah) Langkawi	1 November 1993	The second and latest station in Kedah.
22	(Sabah) Keningau	1 January 2009	The fourth and latest station in Sabah.
23	(Sarawak) Bintulu	12 April 2011	The sixth and latest station in Sarawak.

== Services ==
=== Radio ===
RTM offers 33 FM radio channels – 5 national and 28 local stations, which are collectively known as Radio RTM or Radio Malaysia. Each station has different frequencies, depending on the area of coverage.

==== Nationwide ====
Station	Frequency (FM)	Language
Nasional FM	88.5 MHz	Malay
TraXX FM	90.3 MHz	English
Ai FM	89.3 MHz	Chinese (Mandarin, Cantonese, Hokkien, Teochew and Hakka)
Minnal FM	92.3 MHz	Tamil
Asyik FM	91.1 MHz	Malay and Aslian (Semai, Jakun, Temiar and Temuan)

==== Local ====
RTM's local radio network, formerly known as Radio 3, offers localised services to listeners across their respective states and federal territories. Most stations operate from 6:00 am to midnight daily, with simulcasts of Nasional FM taking place during downtime. Others like Sabah V FM, take simulcasts from another national radio network overnight. KL FM, as well as Sarawak FM, however, operates 24 hours a day. The logos of the local radio stations display colours that match those on Malaysia's individual state or territory flags.

Regional radio stations
Station	Frequencies (Area/Transmitter)	Language
Perlis FM	102.9 MHz (Perlis/Pauh)	Malay
Kedah FM	97.5 MHz (Alor Setar/Mount Jerai); 95.4 MHz (Gulau/Gulau); 105.7 MHz (Langkawi/Gunung Raya); 90.5 MHz (Baling/Bukit Palong); 88.5 MHz (Selama and Bandar Baharu/Bukit Sungai Kecil Hilir); 105.1 MHz (Sik/Bukit Dedap); 105.1 MHz (Sintok/UUM)	Malay
Mutiara FM	93.9 MHz (North Penang/Mount Jerai); 90.9 MHz (Balik Pulau/Bukit Genting); 95.7 MHz (South Penang/Bukit Penara)	Malay
Perak FM	94.7 MHz (Cameron Highlands/Mount Brinchang); 97.3 MHz (Changkat Rembian/Changkat Rembian); 96.2 MHz (Gerik/Gerik); 95.6 MHz (Ipoh/Gunung Kledang); 102.9 MHz (Lawin/Lawin); 94.2 MHz (Lenggong/Bukit Ladang Teh); 104.1 MHz (Taiping/Bukit Larut); 89.6 MHz (Tanjung Malim/Bukit Asa)	Malay
Kelantan FM	107.2 MHz (Dabong/Dabong); 92.0 MHz (Gua Musang/Bukit Chupak); 90.0 MHz (Jeli/Bukit Tangki Air); 102.9 MHz (Kota Bharu/Teliput); 97.3 MHz (Machang/Bukit Bakar); 88.1 MHz (Paloh/Paloh); 107.1 MHz (East Kelantan/Bukit Bintang)	Malay
Terengganu FM	96.2 MHz (Besut/Bukit Bintang); 90.7 MHz (Chukai/Bukit Kemuning); 97.7 MHz (Dungun/Bukit Bauk); 90.0 MHz (FELDA Cerul/FELDA Cerul); 88.9 MHz (FELDA Tenang/FELDA Tenang); 88.7 MHz (Kuala Terengganu/Bukit Besar)	Malay
Pahang FM	88.0 MHz (Bandar Muadzam Shah/Bukit Sembilan); 100.3 MHz (Cameron Highlands/Mount Brinchang); 107.2 MHz (Damak/Bukit Botak); 95.5 MHz (Gambang/Bukit Sulai); 92.7 MHz (Jerantut/Bukit Istana); 104.1 MHz (Kuantan/Bukit Pelindung); 92.0 MHz (Maran/Bukit Senggora); 96.8 MHz (Tioman Island/Tioman Island); 102.2 MHz (Raub/Fraser's Hill); 91.9 MHz (Rompin/Rompin); 107.5 MHz (West Pahang/Mount Ulu Kali)	Malay
Selangor FM	99.8 MHz (Hulu Langat/Hulu Langat); 100.9 MHz (Selangor/Mount Ulu Kali)	Malay
KL FM	97.2 MHz (Kuala Lumpur/Kuala Lumpur Tower)	Malay
Negeri FM	92.6 MHz (Central Negeri Sembilan/Bukit Telapa Burok); 107.7 MHz (Gemas/Mount Ledang); 95.7 MHz (Tampin/Bukit Tampin)	Malay
Melaka FM	102.3 MHz (Malacca/Mount Ledang)	Malay
Johor FM	101.9 MHz (Johor Bahru and Singapore/Mount Pulai); 92.1 MHz (Mersing/Bukit Tinggi); 105.3 MHz (Northern Johor/Mount Ledang)	Malay
Sarawak FM	88.1 MHz (Lambir Hills/Bukit Lambir); 88.9 MHz (Kuching/Mount Serapi); 89.9 MHz (Mukah/Mukah); 91.5 MHz (Sarikei/Bukit Kayu Malam); 92.7 MHz (Kapit/Bukit Kapit); 93.7 MHz (Bintulu/Bukit Setiam); 94.4 MHz (Betong/Spaoh); 94.7 MHz (Bintulu/Bukit Ngabau); 94.8 MHz (Serian/Bukit Ampangan); 95.1 MHz (Setapong/Bukit Singalang); 95.7 MHz (Song/Bukit Song); 97.1 MHz (Suai/Bukit TT844); 97.5 MHz (Lawas/Bukit Tiong); 100.0 MHz (Limbang/Bukit Sagang Rudang); 100.3 MHz (Miri/RTM Miri); 100.3 MHz (Sri Aman/Bukit Temunduk); 101.5 MHz (Limbang/Bukit Mas); 101.5 MHz (Sibu/Bukit Lima); 105.4 MHz (Belaga/Belaga)	Malay and Melanau
Red FM	89.2 MHz (Sarikei/Bukit Kayu Malam); 89.9 MHz (Kapit/Bukit Kapit); 90.7 MHz (Lambir Hills/Bukit Lambir); 91.9 MHz (Kuching/Mount Serapi); 92.3 MHz (Mukah/Mukah); 92.7 MHz (Kapit/Bukit Kapit); 97.2 MHz (Serian/Bukit Ampangan); 97.8 MHz (Betong/Spaoh); 99.0 MHz (Song/Bukit Song); 100.5 MHz (Bintulu/Bukit Setiam); 100.5 MHz (Lawas/Bukit Tiong); 101.1 MHz (Setapong/Bukit Singalang); 104.1 MHz (Limbang/Bukit Mas); 104.1 MHz (Sibu/Bukit Lima); 106.3 MHz (Miri/RTM Miri); 106.3 MHz (Sri Aman/Bukit Temunduk); 107.7 MHz (Limbang/Bukit Sagang Rudang); 107.8 MHz (Belaga/Belaga)	English and Chinese (Mandarin, Fuzhounese and Hakka)
Labuan FM	89.4 MHz (Labuan/Bukit Timbalai); 103.7 MHz (Labuan/RTM Labuan)	Malay
Sabah FM	89.7 MHz (Lahad Datu/Mount Silam); 89.9 MHz (Kota Kinabalu/Bukit Lawa Mandau); 89.9 MHz (Gadong/Gadong); 90.3 MHz (Tenom/Bukit Sigapon); 92.9 MHz (Sandakan/Bukit Trig); 95.7 MHz (Tawau/Mount Andrassy); 95.9 MHz (Kudat/Bukit Kelapa); 97.1 MHz (Kota Marudu/Langkon); 97.9 MHz (Sipitang/Bukit Tampalagus); 101.5 MHz (Kota Belud/Bukit Pompod); 104.1 MHz (Felda Sahabat/Felda Sahabat); 104.5 MHz (Central Sabah/Mount Kinabalu)	Malay
Sabah V FM	91.1 MHz (Kota Marudu/Langkon); 92.5 MHz (Lahad Datu/Mount Silam); 92.6 MHz (Gadong/Gadong); 92.7 MHz (Kota Kinabalu/Bukit Lawa Mandau); 93.1 MHz (Tenom/Bukit Sigapon); 93.3 MHz (Labuan/Bukit Timbalai); 96.1 MHz (Sandakan/Bukit Trig); 98.7 MHz (Kudat/Bukit Kelapa); 99.3 MHz (Tawau/Mount Andrassy); 102.9 MHz (Sipitang/Bukit Tampalagus); 104.1 MHz (Kota Belud/Bukit Pompod); 106.7 MHz (Felda Sahabat/Felda Sahabat); 107.1 MHz (Central Sabah/Mount Kinabalu)	English, Kadazan, Chinese (Mandarin and Hakka), Dusun, Bajau and Murut

Specific-localised radio stations
Station	State	Frequencies (Area/Transmitter)	Language
Langkawi FM	Kedah	104.8 MHz (Langkawi/Gunung Raya)	Malay
Wai FM Iban	Sarawak	101.3 MHz (Kuching/Mount Serapi); 106.9 MHz (Serian/Bukit Ampangan)	Iban
Wai FM Bidayuh	Sarawak	101.7 MHz (Serian/Bukit Ampangan); 106.1 MHz (Kuching/Mount Serapi)	Bidayuh, Kayan and Kenyah
Sri Aman FM	Sarawak	89.5 MHz (Sri Aman/Bukit Temunduk); 99.5 MHz (Betong/Spaoh)	Malay
Sibu FM	Sarawak	87.6 MHz (Sibu/Bukit Lima); 94.3 MHz (Kapit/Bukit Kapit); 94.6 MHz (Sarikei/Bukit Kayu Malam); 98.7 MHz (Mukah/Mukah); 99.8 MHz (Song/Bukit Song); 102.1 MHz (Setapong/Bukit Singgalang); 103.0 MHz (Belaga/Belaga)	Malay, Chinese (Mandarin) and Iban
Bintulu FM	Sarawak	95.3 MHz (Bintulu/RTM Bintulu); 97.5 MHz (Bintulu/Bukit Setiam)	Malay
Miri FM	Sarawak	95.7 MHz (Lambir Hills/Bukit Lambir); 98.0 MHz (Miri/RTM Miri)	Malay, Chinese (Mandarin), Iban, Kayan and Kenyah
Limbang FM	Sarawak	94.5 MHz (Limbang/Bukit Sagang Rudang); 101.1 MHz (Lawas/Bukit Tiong); 104.9 MHz (Limbang/Bukit Mas)	Malay, Bisaya and Lun Bawang
Keningau FM	Sabah	94.7 MHz (Tenom/Bukit Sigapon); 98.4 MHz (Keningau/Federal House)	Malay, Murut and Dusun
Sandakan FM	Sabah	90.1 MHz (Sandakan/Bukit Trig)	Malay
Tawau FM	Sabah	93.6 MHz (Lahad Datu/Mount Silam); 99.1 MHz (FELDA Sahabat/FELDA Sahabat); 100.1 MHz (Tawau/Mount Andrassy)	Malay

=== Television ===
RTM offers six terrestrial TV channels in Malaysia: TV1, TV2, Okey, Berita RTM, Sukan+ and RTM World. While Malay and English are the main languages used for its programmes, three out of six channels also offer vernacular language programmes for its non-Malay native population (widely known as Bumiputera), as well as Chinese and Indian minorities. TV1 and TV2 carry more commercials than other TV channels. On the other hand, TV Okey, Berita RTM, Sukan+ and RTM World air mostly Public Service Announcements.

Name	Availability	Language	Programming	24-hours
TV1	Free-to-air, Satellite, IPTV	Malay and English	News, culture, entertainment and children	Yes
TV2	Free-to-air, Satellite, IPTV	Malay, English, Chinese (Mandarin), Indian (Tamil and Hindi), Korean and Turkish	News, culture, entertainment and children	Yes
TV Okey	Free-to-air, Satellite	Malay, English, Chinese (Mandarin), Indian (Tamil and Punjabi), Bajau, Dusun, Kadazan, Iban and Japanese	News, culture, sports, entertainment, children, animation and education	Yes
Berita RTM	Free-to-air, Satellite	Malay, English, Chinese (Mandarin), Indian (Tamil), Bajau, Dusun, Kadazan and Iban	News	Yes
Sukan+	Free-to-air, Satellite	Malay and English	Sports	Yes
RTM World (part of Berita RTM)	Free-to-air	English	News, international from the RTM studio	No

=== Digital platforms ===
RTMKlik (formerly MyKlik and RTM Mobile) is RTM's Over-the-top media service (OTT). Launched on 18 April 2012, it covers viewers across multiple devices such as computers, tablets, smartphones. The service's website contains all RTM television channels and radio stations, as well as online parliament streaming channel RTM Parlimen and audio podcasts.

On 19 April 2013, RTM announced an online alternative new channel called Portal 1News to complement its TV1 and TV2 news bulletins, which was launched in August 2013. The channel was hosted on the 1news.rtm.gov.my portal and provided news in video format in four-hour intervals from 9am to 10pm daily.

RTM Parlimen, launched on 1 July 2013, broadcasts the parliamentary session from Monday to Thursday from 10 am to 1 pm (or later) in the morning session and from 2.30 pm to 5.30 pm (or later) in the evening session. Apart from RTMKlik, RTM Parlimen can also be watched through the RTM Parlimen page channel.

RTMKlik has also introduced a Free Ad-Supported Streaming Television (FAST) channel called "Saluran Feeling Feeling" in 2025. This new addition supposedly offers a continuous stream of entertainment, reinforcing RTMKlik's commitment to accessible and diverse digital content.

=== Publications ===
In 1990, RTM partnered with the National Broadcasters Guild of Malaysia (PENYIAR) to published Majalah RTM (RTM Magazine), a monthly entertainment and broadcast listings magazine. The magazine's first issue was published in October 1990, but ceased publication in early 2000s. It was one of the two magazines published by RTM, the other being Gema RTM (RTM Echoes).

== Music ensemble ==
Orkestra RTM is RTM's broadcasting orchestra which was established in 1961 as Orkestra Radio Malaya, later renamed as Orkestra Radio Malaysia in 1963 before assuming its present name in 1969. Maintained by the broadcaster's Music Service Division, it produces and performs orchestra-based entertainment programs as well as performs in various music events in Malaysia and abroad. Renowned music conductor, Mokhzani Ismail is the orchestra's music director since 1999. In 2011, Orkestra RTM received recognition from The Malaysia Book of Records as the longest-running musical orchestra in Malaysia.

== Flagship programmes ==
Some of RTM's flagship programmes include:

- Selamat Pagi Malaysia (Good Morning Malaysia) – A breakfast television programme launched on 1 January 1984 in the form of a talk show. Formerly broadcasts only on weekends, particularly on Friday and Sunday, it started full-time morning broadcast on 1 March 1994. Apart from the main talk segments, the talk show also includes live reports of major events from various locations across the country, as well as weather report from the Malaysian Meteorological Department and home shopping segments targeting mainly Malay viewers.
- Forum Perdana Ehwal Islam (Islamic Affairs Flagship Forum) – an Islamic talk show programme first aired since 1990. Each episode features various Islamic religious leaders to discuss various topics related to Islam. Co-produced by RTM and the Department of Islamic Development Malaysia (JAKIM), it is the longest-running religious television series on Malaysian television.
- Panorama – A magazine documentary programme first aired since 7 January 2002 in the form of travelogue with one or two reports highlighted in each episodes. Some of the topics that highlighted in the series include the environment, science and technology, biology, arts and culture, human interests as well as humanitarian issues.
- Simfoni Alam (Nature's Symphony) – A nature documentary television programme first aired since 2004. The series take an in-depth look at particular natural history events, stories or subjects from around Malaysia.
- Agrotek (Agrotech) – A documentary television programme first aired since 2004. The series take a look at information and all aspects related to agriculture, agro-based industries, fisheries and livestock.
- Salam Baitullah – A spiritual television programme first aired since 2009. The series covers the highlights and current information of Muslims who performing the Hajj pilgrimage in Mecca, Saudi Arabia.
- Tumit Tinggi (High Heels) – A magazine documentary programme first aired since 9 April 2017 that covers the lifestyles of modern Malaysian women and issues related to womanhood.

== Cultural significance ==
Until the development and establishment of television in Malaysia, radio was the broadcast medium upon which people in Malaysia relied. It "provides services and information to its faithful listeners". RTM was the only television broadcaster in Malaysia until 1984 when TV3 was established and began operations. Further, it also was the only legal radio broadcaster in the country until 1989 when Best 104 began operating. RTM is among the earliest media brands that launched web streaming services in 1996.

Despite the advent of commercial television and radio, with competition from Media Prima, Astro and TV Alhijrah as well as digital service providers, RTM has remained one of the main elements in social and cultural history of Malaysia through its obligation to produce radio and TV programmes for mass audiences, inline with the "government's policy and the nation's aspiration". However, when TV2 came to exist, it allowed the RTM to produce programmes that encompassed various genres like drama, documentaries, religious programming, current affairs, entertainment, and sport. Examples cited include the television series Simfoni Alam, Gerak Khas, My Travel Sight, Mat Despatch, Opah, Forum Perdana Ehwal Islam and Bicara Rakyat. Some of RTM shows also have a direct impact on society. For example, Ikon Siarawan is credited with strengthening interest in broadcasting, with its objectives to shaping the younger generation's broadcasting career while soaring them to a greater heights, while Opah is known to have a social impact on the Malaysian Malay community as it revolves on a grandmother's love towards her children and grandchildren. RTM also became host of major sports events which took it "to a new level of technical excellence". For example, it hosted the 16th Commonwealth Games, collectively known as SUKOM 98 in 1998 and 21st SEA Games in 2001. This gave RTM the opportunity "to handle an international sporting event with multiple live telecasts and intensive coverage". Longest-running RTM shows include: Selamat Pagi Malaysia, broadcast on TV1 since 1985 and Panorama, also broadcast on TV1 since 2002. Most RTM programmes were produced by its in-house units or production companies that were commissioned by RTM.

The Anugerah Seri Angkasa was first broadcast on RTM in 1972 to recognized the industry players who contributed for the radio and television programming. Many of Malaysian household stars have their breakthrough success at RTM. Bintang RTM, the broadcaster's reality singing competition, have produced many of its notable contestants who first got their fame such as Sudirman Arshad, Jamal Abdillah, Ramlah Ram, Izwan Pilus, Siti Sarah and Ernie Zakri. RTM also produced other reality shows like Bintang HMI, Bintang Gala 2 and Golden Teen Search where artistes like Siti Nurhaliza, Dayang Nurfaizah and Liza Hanim making waves in Malaysian entertainment industry. RTM's radio services also has creates many significant achievements in recent years. In 2001, one of its radio services, Radio 4 (later known as Traxx FM) became the first radio station in the country to broadcast the birth of a baby, a boy live on air, where it received recognition from the Malaysia Book of Records as "The First Baby Born Via a Live Radio Broadcast".

Like other agencies, RTM places emphasis on the ethical and proper use of Bahasa Malaysia as its official language. It is also known for airing a large number of public service announcements (PSA). Most of these ads were from government agencies or RTM itself, especially PSAs that were produced during the Mahathir Mohamad era as the country's fourth Prime Minister. From its humble beginnings, RTM has fulfilled its mandate to be the "loyal companion" of Malaysians and being more "media-friendly". It also has its own "advantages both from the point of view of experience", with its "role as the state-owned broadcaster and having a partnership network with various ministries and other government agencies". Nevertheless, it also became more inclusive in "helping to shape a progressive community" and "nurturing the values of positive spiritual and attitude" in order to reflect the diversity of Malaysia.

=== Public response ===
RTM's legacy as a national public service broadcaster in the country is praised and lauded by many parties, despite receiving much criticism in recent years. Former sports journalist Ahmad Faisal Mohamed Fiah, in his column written in Sinar Harian, observed that RTM's contribution to the broadcasting industry is "undeniable" and "continued to move forward with the nation's development and progress". Intan Soliha Ibrahim of Universiti Malaysia Sabah points out that RTM had serves as a "government mouthpiece" and a "watchdog between the government and the community".

Former Menteri Besar of Perak, Ahmad Faizal Azumu said that RTM "is as relevant as ever in the New Malaysia". He also praised the broadcaster for "playing well its role of disseminating accurate news". Former Communications and Multimedia Minister, Gobind Singh Deo described RTM as a "professional and mature" broadcasting corporation and insisted that it "is an institution". He also noted that RTM had always "made decision based on experience" it obtained and "support any government policy". During the RTM's 70th anniversary celebration in 2016, former Prime Minister, Najib Razak said that RTM has played an integral role "in promoting unity among the people of various races" and also "fostered national development" as well as "cultivated the image of a government elected by the people".

The Ambassador of Turkey to Malaysia, Emir Salim Yuksel during his official visit to RTM in Angkasapuri on 18 October 2022 said: "RTM is one of the most crucial channel in delivering news to the community and so does with other production houses under its umbrella".

== Visual identity ==
The RTM logo appears in numerous settings to identify the broadcaster. It introduced its first corporate logo in 1957, 11 years after it started its radio broadcast. The Radio Malaya logo consisted of the 'R' and 'M' letters which situated inside the black and white circle. The logo design remains unchanged even after Radio Malaya renamed as Radio Malaysia following the establishment of Malaysia on 16 September 1963 and continued to be used until 1969. When Televisyen Malaysia started operations on 28 December 1963, it adopted its first logo. The contour of the Televisyen Malaysia's logo consists of a star lies in a black circle surrounded by a blazing fire rendered in white and orange.

Upon the merger of Radio Malaysia and Televisyen Malaysia to become RTM in 1969, the broadcaster adopted its first corporate logo, with the RTM name was stylized in lowercase title, which was continued to be used to this day. The logo has since been redesigned a number of times, most recently in 2021 with the current logo was redesigned from the 2004 logo to work across media. From 1969, there have been five different RTM logos. The first logo of the network was used from 1969 to 1978. The second logo was used from 1978 to 1987, which referred as the eye, similar to the CBS eye logo.

The third logo, used from 1987 to 2004, was unveiled on 27 December 1987, the 24th anniversary of Malaysian television and the 25th of RTM as a whole. The logo features a wireframe globe, accompanied by the RTM wordmark in the middle, represent Malaysia as a well-known country. The globe includes latitude and longitude lines, representing RTM becoming a regional media outlet to promote the country's positioning in the international community. The square represents a television screen, a microphone and broadcasting technology. The four colours of the logo have a meaning: gold for Malaysia's governance, dark blue for peace, well-being and prosperity, white for purity, sincerity and loyalty and silver for RTM's relationship with the audience.

The fourth was used from 2004 to 2021. The fifth and current logo was adopted in April 2021. RTM also used numerous slogans for its identity. Its main corporate slogan, "Teman Setia Anda" ("Your Loyal Companion") was used since 1987.

Radio Malaya logo, used from 1946 until 1957

Radio Malaya and Radio Malaysia logo, used from 1957 until 1969.

Televisyen Malaysia logo, used from 1963 until 1969.

RTM's first logo, used from 1969 until 1978.

RTM's second logo, used from 1978 until 1987.

RTM's third logo, used from 1987 until 2004.

RTM's fourth logo, used from 2004 until 2021.

RTM's fifth and current logo, used since 2021.

== Criticism and controversies ==
Throughout the years, RTM has been involved in numerous controversies from perceived biased coverage of specific news stories, censorship of aired programming, down to recent extensive incorporation of generative AI.

== Incidents ==
On 10 April 1983, a fire occurred on RTM's 6th floor at 1:30 pm. The fire destroyed several files at its File Division and Media Assist Unit and also caused technical damage. Its radio and TV broadcasts, however, were not affected by the fire.

On 26 July 2015, RTM's computerized storage data room on the 5th floor of its TV facility caught fire at 8:25 am. The fire and rescue department successfully controlled the raging fire. No accidents and injuries occurred during the incident.

== Awards and accolades ==
Year	Award-giving body	Category	Recipient	Result	Ref.
2023	Asia Pacific Broadcasting Awards 2023	—N/a	Radio Televisyen Malaysia	Won	
2023	Malaysia Public Relations Awards 2023	PRCA Malaysia Leadership Award	Radio Televisyen Malaysia	Won	
2023	Medical Travel Media Awards 2023	Best Health Travel Editorial Team	Radio Televisyen Malaysia	Won	
2024	National Environmental Day 2024	Cross-Platform Collaborative Media Award	Radio Televisyen Malaysia	Won	
2024	National Art Awards 2024	Anugerah Pendukung Seni	Radio Televisyen Malaysia	Won	
2025	Agrobank Media Awards 2024/2025	—N/a	Radio Televisyen Malaysia	Won	
2025	Anugerah Kecemerlangan Media KPKT 2025	Minister's Special Award	Radio Televisyen Malaysia	Won	
2025	Sustainable Media Awards 2025	—N/a	Radio Televisyen Malaysia	Won	
2025	Excellence Coverage Media Awards 2025	—N/a	Radio Televisyen Malaysia	Won	
2026	MACC Media Awards 2026	Best Audiovisual Production	Radio Televisyen Malaysia	Won	
2026	KPKT Media Excellence Award 2026	—N/a	Radio Televisyen Malaysia	Won	

== See also ==
- List of television stations in Malaysia
- List of Malay language television channels
- List of radio stations in Malaysia
- Mass media in Malaysia
- Television in Malaysia
- Media Prima
- Astro
- Mediacorp
- Radio Television Brunei
