= TV Okey =

Malaysian television channel

RTM TV Okey
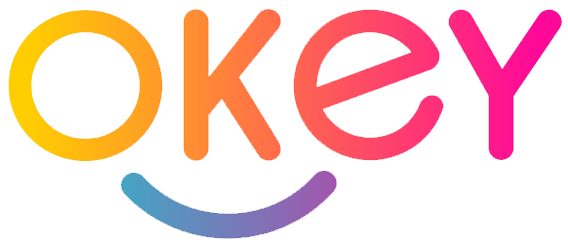
- Current logo, an iteration of the 21 March 2018 logo, used since 1 April 2019.
- Country: Malaysia
- Broadcast area: Malaysia; Singapore; Brunei; Thailand (South Thailand, particularly Songkhla, Narathiwat, Yala and Satun); Indonesia (West Kalimantan, Riau Islands and North Kalimantan); Philippines (particularly southern Palawan and Tawi-Tawi)
- Headquarters: Angkasapuri, Kuala Lumpur, Malaysia; Bangunan Kompleks Kementerian Komunikasi Sabah, Jalan Lintas, Kepayan, Kota Kinabalu, Sabah, Malaysia; Bangunan RTM Sarawak, Jalan P. Ramlee, Taman Budaya, Kuching, Sarawak, Malaysia (secondary cum regional productions)

Programming
- Languages: Malay; English; Mandarin; Tamil; Punjabi; Bajau; Dusun; Kadazan; Iban; Japanese
- Picture format: 16:9 HDTV (1080i)

Ownership
- Owner: Radio Televisyen Malaysia
- Sister channels: TV1; TV2; Berita RTM; Sukan+; RTM World

History
- Launched: 1 February 2000; 26 years ago (trial broadcast RTMi); 11 April 2006; 20 years ago (official broadcast RTMi); 16 March 2009; 17 years ago (Muzik Aktif); 11 April 2011; 15 years ago (TVi); 21 March 2018; 8 years ago (TV Okey); 1 April 2019; 7 years ago (MYTV) (HD)
- Closed: 15 March 2009; 17 years ago (RTMi); 10 April 2011; 15 years ago (Muzik Aktif); 20 March 2018; 8 years ago (TVi); 31 March 2019; 7 years ago (MYTV) (SD)
- Former names: RTMi (1 February 2000 - 15 March 2009); Muzik Aktif (16 March 2009 - 10 April 2011); TVi (11 April 2011 - 20 March 2018)

Availability

Terrestrial
- MYTV: Channel 110 (HD)

Streaming media
- RTMKlik: Watch live

RTM TV Okey (stylised as OKeY, an acronym for Opportunity, Knowledge, Experience and Yours) is a Malaysian free-to-air television channel operated by Radio Televisyen Malaysia dedicated to East Malaysians and urban youths. It was launched on 21 March 2018 and airs programmes in English, Malay, and East Malaysian languages such as Bajau, Dusun, Kadazan (Sabah) and Iban (Sarawak).

== History ==
Previously, Radio Televisyen Malaysia had operated Televisyen Malaysia Rangkaian Ketiga ("Television Malaysia's Third Network") which subsumed operations of Sabah TV from Sabah's state government that ran from 1970 to 1975 and had spread its airwaves to Sarawak later in the merger, Rangkaian Ketiga was later dissolved in 1984.

Between 2006 and 2018, three test channels were launched by RTM as part of its Digital terrestrial television (DTT) broadcasting trial on selected households and pay television network Astro channel 180 RTMi, RTM Muzik Aktif (Active Music) and TVi (TV Interaktif/TV Interactive). RTMi was a channel that broadcast RTM1 and RTM2 programme previews for 5 hours daily from 7:00 p.m. until 12:00 a.m., RTM Muzik Aktif was a music channel that airs mainstream and independent Malaysian music as well as music-oriented programmes while TVi was a channel that promoted East Malaysian culture. There were plans in the early 2010s to launch separate focused television channels for Sabah and Sarawak by RTM, but eventually they were not realised. In Sarawak, however, the state television plan was later undertaken by Sarawak Media Group, which launched TVS on 11 October 2020.

TV Okey was launched on 21 March 2018 in the evening at Hilton Hotel in Kota Kinabalu, Sabah and officiated by the then-Prime Minister, Najib Razak. On 1 April 2019, TV Okey has started its HDTV broadcasting in conjunction with RTM's 73rd anniversary, and available exclusively through myFreeview DTT service on Channel 110. Beginning 6 April 2020, TV Pendidikan air on the channel daily under the Kelas@Rumah (Class@Home) programming, marking its return to RTM after 20 years.

== Logo history ==
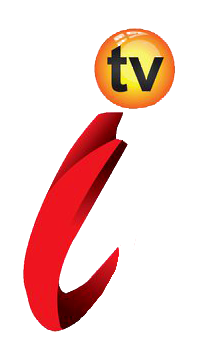
Old logo of TVi (2011-2014)

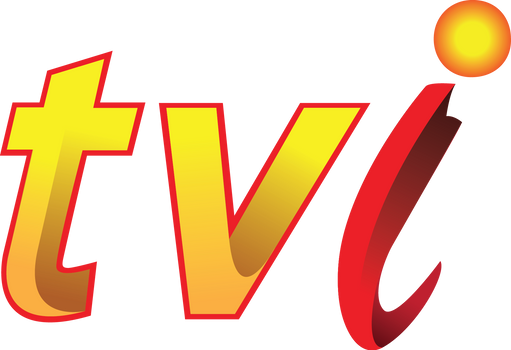
TVi logo (2014–2018)

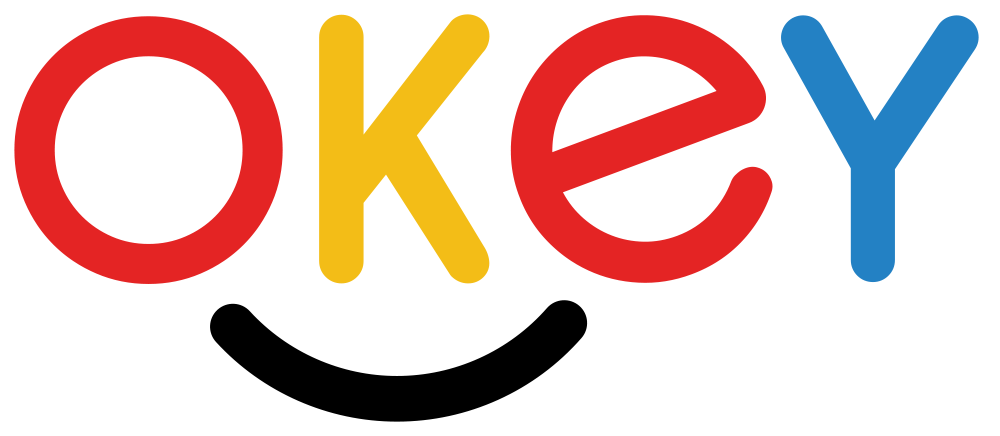
Old logo of OKEY (2018–2019)

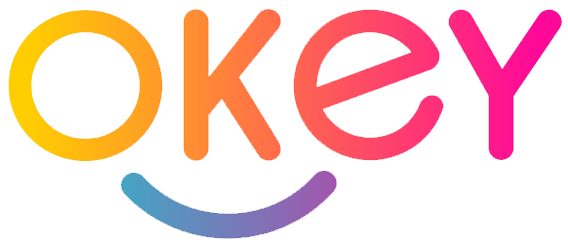
Current logo of OKEY (2019–present)

== See also ==
- TV1
- TV2
- Sukan+
- Berita RTM
- Rangkaian Ketiga
- Television in Malaysia
- Radio Televisyen Malaysia
