= Astro Awani =

Malaysian news channel

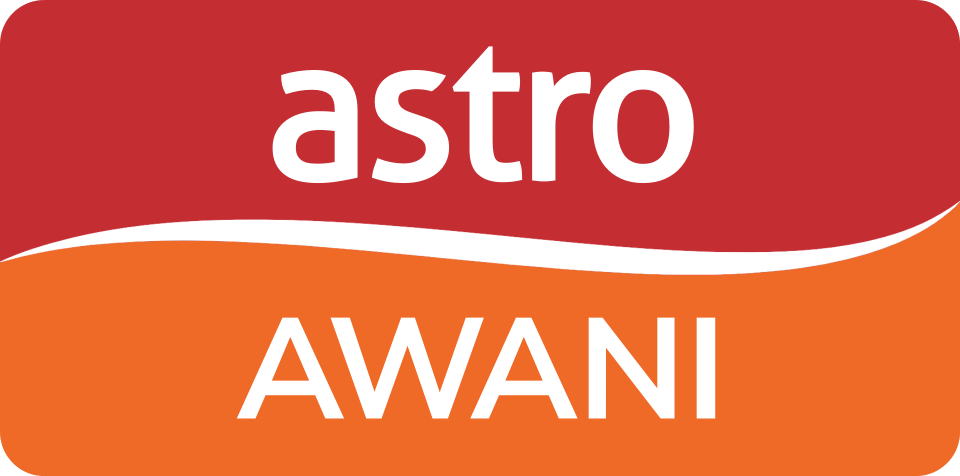
- Country: Malaysia
- Broadcast area: Malaysia; Worldwide (via YouTube & Mobile Application)
- Headquarters: Bukit Jalil, Kuala Lumpur, Malaysia

Programming
- Languages: Malay; English
- Picture format: HDTV (1080i 16:9)

Ownership
- Owner: Astro
- Parent: Astro Awani Network Sdn Bhd

History
- Launched: 15 June 2006 (Indonesia); 6 September 2007 (SD) (Malaysia); 29 March 2021 (HD)
- Founder: Ananda Krishnan; James Riady
- Replaced: Astro News
- Closed: 20 October 2008 (Indonesia); 1 August 2016 (HyppTV); 29 March 2021 (SD) (Astro only); 1 April 2022 (Kristal-Astro only; Brunei, HD)
- Former names: Astro News (2002–2009)

Links
- Website: astroawani.com

Availability

Streaming media
- Astro Awani: Watch live
- YouTube: Watch live
- Astro: Astro GO / On Demand / Sooka / SYOK (Astro Awani Radio)
- Google News: Astro Awani

Astro Awani is a Malaysian news channel, founded by and currently broadcast through streaming service and pay TV provider owned by Astro Awani Network Sdn Bhd and operated by Astro. It broadcasts an array of programmes including bulletins, business & current affairs shows, special interviews, investigative reports, variety programmes, as well as selected magazine shows.

Its flagship programmes include Awani 7:45, its primetime news programme; Agenda Awani, which discusses current affairs; and Buletin Awani, which provides rolling news bulletins on an hourly basis.

== History ==
In 2002, Astro Ria had its own news programme titled Bloomberg RIA News made in collaboration with Bloomberg News. This was later spun off into a precursor news channel named Astro News carrying programming from Al Jazeera (broadcast in Arabic with live Malaysian dubbing), BBC World, CCTV-9, Eurosport News, the Australia Network and Deutsche Welle; almost all networks except DW carried on that channel were since available separately. It also aired a half-hour locally produced eponymous news program with the national news agency Bernama until February 2007 also translated into Mandarin Chinese on Astro AEC (Chinese: Astro 华语新闻; pinyin: Astro Huāyu Xīnwen), Malaysian on Astro Ria (as Berita Astro) and Tamil on Astro Vaanavil (as Astro செய்திகள் Astro Sedhigal).

The Astro Awani brand was first launched on 15 June 2006 in Indonesia originally as a infotainment and lifestyle channel part of the main line-up for Astro's Indonesian operations or Astro Nusantara, a joint venture between Astro and Indonesian conglomerate Lippo Group. However, due to disputes between the joint venture partners, the Indonesian version went off-air in October 2008. Meanwhile on 6 September 2007, Awani launched in Malaysia in a press conference at the Palace of the Golden Horses hotel, Seri Kembangan.

On 26 February 2008, the channel was renumbered to channel 501, and has kept this designation ever since.

== Programming ==
The programming of Astro Awani is focused primarily on news, business, and politics with weather updates, sports news, informative and lifestyle programs as secondary contents. The network also shows documentaries and television specials.

Unlike Berita RTM and Bernama TV, which airs news in Malay, English, Mandarin and Tamil, Astro Awani only airs news in both Malay and English.

== See also ==
- Bernama TV
- Berita RTM
