= Berita RTM =

Malaysian government television news network

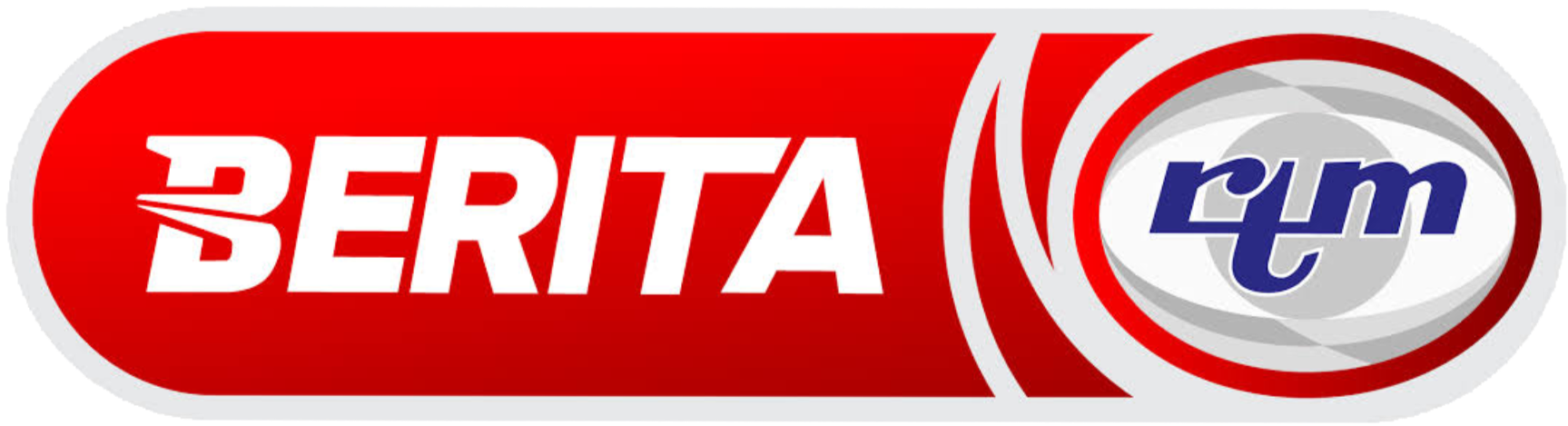
- Logo used since 1 January 2020, Berita in all caps and RTM in lowerscript.
- Country: Malaysia
- Broadcast area: Malaysia; Singapore; Brunei; Thailand (Southern Thailand, particularly Songkhla, Narathiwat, Yala and Satun); Indonesia (West Kalimantan, North Kalimantan and Riau Islands); Philippines (particularly southern Palawan and Tawi-Tawi)
- Headquarters: Wisma Berita, Angkasapuri, Kuala Lumpur, Malaysia

Programming
- Languages: Malay; English; Mandarin; Tamil; Bajau; Dusun; Kadazan; Iban
- Picture format: 16:9 HDTV (1080i)

Ownership
- Owner: Radio Televisyen Malaysia
- Sister channels: TV1; TV2; TV Okey; Sukan+; RTM World

History
- Launched: 30 December 2018; 7 years ago (trial broadcast); 1 January 2020; 6 years ago (brand introduction); 25 June 2020; 6 years ago (official broadcast)
- Former names: BES (30 - 31 December 2018); RTM News (1 January 2019 - 31 March 2019); Saluran Berita RTM (1 April 2019 - 31 December 2019)

Links
- Website: berita.rtm.gov.my

Availability

Terrestrial
- MYTV: Channel 123 (HD)

Streaming media
- RTMKlik: Watch live

Berita RTM (lit. 'RTM News', stylised as BERITA rtm), also known as Saluran Berita RTM (lit. 'RTM News Channel'), or BES (Berita Ehwal Semasa, lit. 'Current Affairs News') is a free-to-air Malaysian television news channel owned and operated by Radio Televisyen Malaysia (RTM). With 'Yang Sahih di Berita RTM' (Trustworthy at RTM News) as its corporate slogan, the network is headquartered at the Wisma Berita RTM in Angkasapuri and was launched on 25 June 2020 alongside its television channel at 7.45 pm (MST) and broadcast via MYTV channel 123. It broadcasts specialised news covering of current affairs and talk shows in high definition (HD). Berita RTM channel broadcast 24 hours a day covering a wide range of languages, mainly in Malay, English, Mandarin and Tamil in addition to East Malaysian languages: Iban, Kadazan, Dusun and Bajau.

The dynamic transformation of the new channel also offers a variety of features compared to other TV channels as it broadcasts its binge-watching marathon-running multilingual news from 12 noon to 1.30 pm followed by 6.30 pm to 9 pm. The channel is live-streamed on RTM's streaming service, RTM Klik, alongside on YouTube and Facebook.

== History ==
Prior to Berita RTM's launch, Malaysia has only two news channels, namely Astro Awani, owned and operated by satellite television operator, Astro and Bernama TV, owned and operated by news agency, Bernama.

The channel began its trial broadcast on 30 December 2018 and began official broadcast on 25 June 2020 and officiated by the then-Minister of Communications and Multimedia, Saifuddin Abdullah as part of government’s initiative to counter the fake news.

Beginning 1 April 2021, in conjunction with RTM's 75th anniversary, East Malaysian indigenous language news (Iban, Kadazan, Dusun and Bajau) are also available on the channel besides on sister channel TV Okey. Beginning 14 February 2023, RTM airs both the morning and evening parliamentary sessions live on the channel.

On 1 April 2023, RTM's 77th anniversary, prime time news slot was forwarded to 16 minutes early to include the evening edition of the express news programme Kanta 744 (pronounced Kanta tujuh-empat-empat, meaning Lens 744), while the English language news programme Malaysia Tonight was rebranded from News@10 and forwarded from 10pm to 8:30pm daily after the prime time news airing.

On 1 October 2023, Berita RTM underwent a major revamp on its news timeslot and programme restructuring. This includes dividing morning news into five separate programmes for National, Sabah, Sarawak, sports (Stadium RTM) and express (Kanta 744) editions. At the same time, a special segment called Biar Betul (roughly meaning "Really" or "For Real") began to aired on the channel and its sister channel, TV1 as well as RTM's social media platforms.

On 20 July 2024, the Installation of Yang di-Pertuan Agong XVII became the first event to be aired on the channel live in English following footage demands from foreign media, as previous live events were simultaneously broadcast with TV1 in Malay. Since then, similar arrangements have also been made for several other events of national significance such as the annual Independence Day Parade.

In conjunction with Malaysia's 2025 ASEAN Chairmanship, RTM launched the RTM ASEAN segment on the channel on 1 August 2024, initially lasted for one and a half hour from 8:30pm to 10:00pm, comprising three programmes: 'Malaysia Tonight' (news programme), 'On The Table' (talk show) and 'World Around Us' (documentary). This had been extended until midnight on 18 November the same year, lasting for three and a half hour and introducing new programmes like Behind The Mic and Global Voices.

Effective 1 April 2026 – the 80th anniversary of RTM, the RTM ASEAN segment was rebranded as RTM World with broadcast extended until 7:00am the following day, as well as focus on a variety of topics such as Global, ASEAN, Muslim World and Dunia Melayu (Malay World). But despite this extension, the segment's broadcast at the moment consists of mostly reruns of RTM former programming from other sister channels. At the same time, more modern-looking new intros were also introduced to all RTM TV news programmes. Unlike its TV counterpart however, the RTM World online channel on YouTube and RTMKlik is broadcast for 24 hours.

During the 2026 FIFA World Cup broadcast with Unifi TV, Parliamentary Broadcast was temporarily suspended on the channel to make way for tournament coverage and resumed right after the event concluded.

== Programming ==
Former RTM ASEAN Logo (2024-2026)

Berita RTM focusing on news and news-related programs broadcast 24 hours daily in 4 languages: Malay, English, Mandarin and Tamil. It is one of the two Malaysian television news channel broadcast in multilingual. The other being Bernama TV.

The channel offers 25 daily news slots, 12 talk shows a week, five business news days and two weekly magazine programs that contribute to the empowerment of the public with a wealth of information. The channel also simulcasts news programmes originally targeted at TV1 and TV2 viewers. The network also allows viewers to watch multi-language radio news broadcasts as well as live broadcasts from RTM radio stations across the country which also discuss specific issues at the state level. One of the network’s TV programmes is Pastikan Sahih (Ensure Trustworthy), a TV program aimed to combatting viral fake news. It aired at 6.30 pm Weekdays.

== Controversy ==
On 11 May 2021, the Mandarin news segment shown on Berita RTM broadcast a report of Israel's airstrike against Palestine, which the news presenter mistakenly labelling Hamas as a 'militants'. Following the incident, two RTM Mandarin news editors have been called to give an explanation and have been issued a show-cause letters. RTM later issued an apology in its Twitter account over the incident.

During the live broadcast of the opening ceremony of the 47th Association of Southeast Asian Nations (ASEAN) Summit in 2025, RTM has misidentified the leaders of Singapore, Thailand and Indonesia. A broadcast commentator had misidentified Singapore's Prime Minister Lawrence Wong as his predecessor, Mr Lee Hsien Loong. The commentator had also misidentified Thai Prime Minister Anutin Charnvirakul as Srettha Thavisin and getting the name of Indonesian President Prabowo Subianto as Joko Widodo.

== See also ==
- Astro Awani
- Bernama TV
