= Angkasapuri =

Malaysian federal building

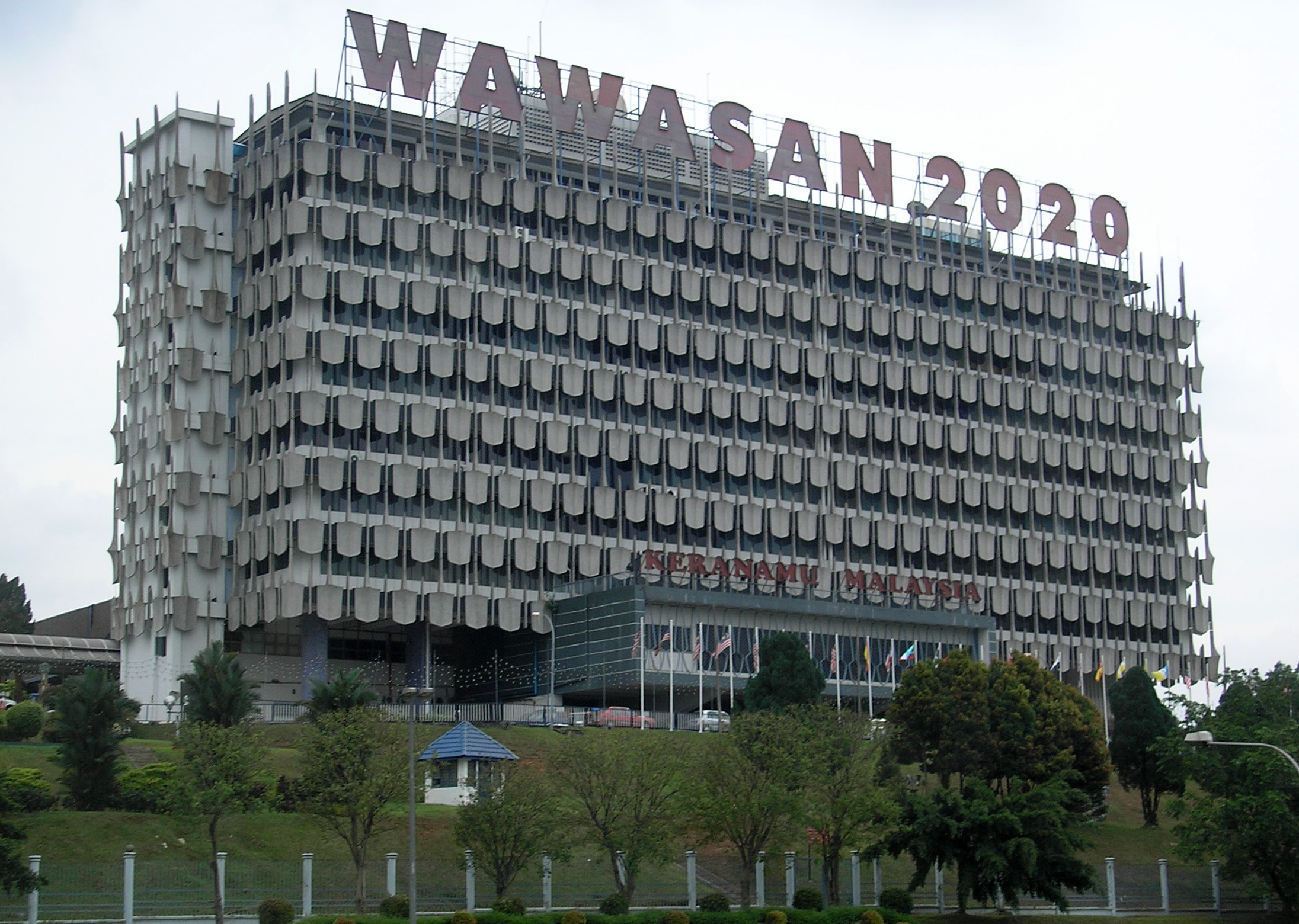
- The Angkasapuri building is prominently erected atop Bukit Putra, close to the Kerinchi stretch of the Federal Highway (Federal Route 2).
- Interactive map of the Angkasapuri area

General information
- Type: Office and Broadcasting House
- Architectural style: Modern architecture
- Location: Lembah Pantai, Kuala Lumpur, Malaysia, Department of Broadcasting Malaysia, Angkasapuri, 50614, Kuala Lumpur
- Coordinates: 3°6′40.0″N 101°40′13.9″E
- Construction started: 1966
- Completed: February 1968
- Owner: Radio Televisyen Malaysia (RTM)

Technical details
- Floor count: 8

Design and construction
- Architect: Ronald Pratt
- Architecture firm: BEP Akitek

Angkasapuri is the main governmental building for Malaysia's Ministry of Information and it is also the headquarters for Radio Television Malaysia (RTM) located in Lembah Pantai, Kuala Lumpur, Malaysia.

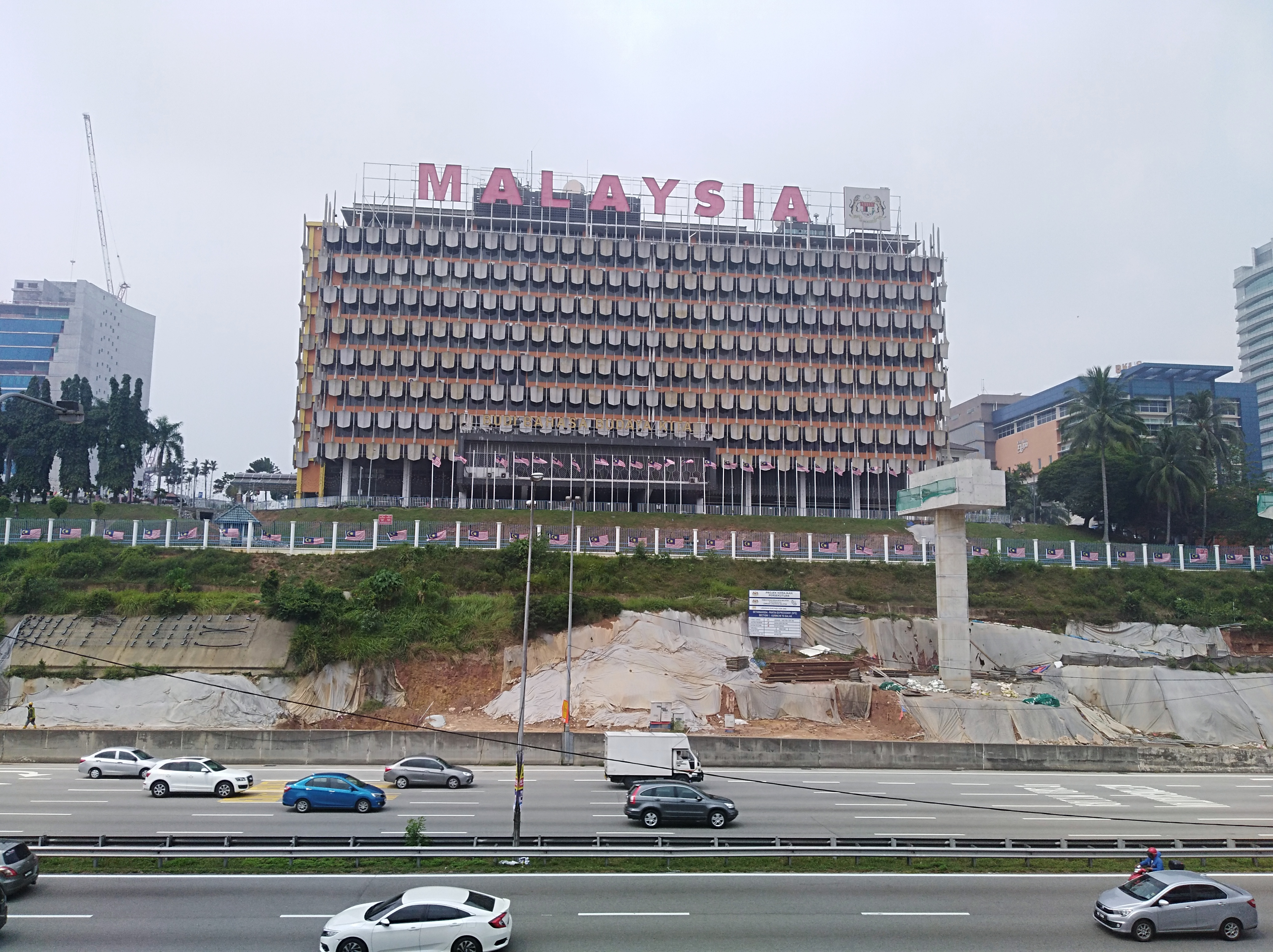
Angkasapuri in August 2019

== History ==
=== Pre-Angkasapuri (1946–1968) ===
==== Radio ====
RTM was established as Radio Malaya operating out of Singapore on 1 April 1946. Upon Malayan independence in 1957, RTM was split into two stations, with Radio Singapura taking over in Singapore while Radio Malaya moved to Federal House, Victory Avenue, Kuala Lumpur, going on air from the new location on 1 January 1959. Radio Malaya became Radio Malaysia on 16 September 1963 upon the formation of Malaysia.

Before moving into the Federal House, Radio Malaya's Kuala Lumpur activities included the setup of main office in Oriental Building at Java Street (now Jalan Tun Perak) and a temporary recording studio in Tang Ling Hospital at Young Road (now Pesiaran Raja Chulan).

==== Television ====
Television broadcasts were launched on 28 December 1963, at Dewan Tunku Abdul Rahman (now the Malaysian Tourist Information Centre or MATIC), along Jalan Ampang, Kuala Lumpur.

=== Angkasapuri (1968–present) ===
Malaysia's new broadcasting centre, named "Angkasapuri" began construction in 1966 and was complete by February 1968. Angkasapuri was officially opened by the first Prime Minister of Malaysia, Tunku Abdul Rahman on 17 February 1968. Tunku Abdul Rahman in his speech called the main building at that time as "the most beautiful" of all government buildings in the country, while the then-Information Minister Senu Abdul Rahman in his speech called the building as a symbol of "determination of the country to uphold truth, and freedom of thought, expression and religion" when comparing that to the Parliament building which has a similar symbolisation.

The beginning of the broadcast in Angkasapuri began on 6 October 1969 while the studios in Jalan Ampang would broadcast the final broadcast with the song "Negaraku", the national anthem of Malaysia on the same day.

Wisma Televisyen, or Wisma TV, housing RTM's TV division opened on 6 November 1969.

Radio Malaysia became Rangkaian Nasional on 1 January 1971 and became the nation's first 24-hour radio station. Wisma Radio, hosting the RTM Radio network studios, opened on 9 May 1972. RTM began colour TV transmissions for the States of Malaysia in December 1978, in conjunction with the state broadcaster's fifteenth TV anniversary. The first colour programme broadcast was Puspawarna. Colour TV programmes to Sabah and Sarawak began in August 1980.

Angkasapuri created history when a giant national flag measuring 85.3 meters long and 24.3-meters wide, using 60 rolls of fabric was unfurled by 500 employees of the Ministry of Information. The giant flag was raised for 10 minutes starting at 09:00 local time and it was witnessed by 5000 of the ministry's staff on 1 January 1988.

The earth-satellite complex opened in 17 December 1988, costing RM 3 million.

2012 saw the addition of Wisma Berita RTM, containing RTM's newsroom, to the Angkasapuri complex. It was inaugurated by the then-Malaysian Minister of Information, Communication, Arts and Culture, Dato' Seri Utama Dr. Rais Yatim on 6 June 2012.

==== Angkasapuri Media City ====
On 26 October 2022, the ninth Prime Minister of Malaysia, Datuk Seri Ismail Sabri Yaakob launched a new media city building in the complex named the Angkasapuri Media City (Malay: Angkasapuri Kota Media).

== Structure ==
Angkasapuri Broadcasting Centre is located in the jurisdictional area of Kuala Lumpur City Hall. The building was erected with a height of 10-floors above an area of about 33 acres, at the junction of Kuala Lumpur - Port Klang Federal Highway and New Pantai Expressway (NPE). The main entrance of the complex faces the NPE.

It has the following structures:

- Main Building – administration building for the Broadcasting Department.
- Wisma Televisyen – houses RTM's TV division.
- Wisma Radio – RTM's radio division.
- International Broadcast Centre (IBC) – Opened on 24 August 1998, RTM's engineering department and other departments are located here, in addition to international shortwave radio broadcasts. It served as the International Broadcast Centre of the 1998 Commonwealth Games, with RTM being the event's host broadcaster.
- Wisma Berita RTM is home to RTM's newsroom.
- Auditorium Perdana – home to major live broadcasts.
- Auditorium P. Ramlee – the secondary concert venue, named after the late artist, P. Ramlee (1929 - 1973).
- Tun Abdul Razak Institute for Broadcasting and Information (IPPTAR) – Selangor state radio station, Selangor FM and headquarters of Asia-Pacific Broadcasting Union, which RTM is one of its members are located here. IPPTAR also is a headquarters of the Malaysian National Broadcasters Association (PENYIAR), a broadcast media organization representing both public and private broadcasters in the country, which RTM is also one of its members.

== Transportation ==
=== Car ===
- Federal Route 2 Federal Highway - Kuala Lumpur to Port Klang.
- New Pantai Expressway - Angkasapuri is located near the beginning of this expressway, which goes all the way to Subang Jaya.

=== Public transportation ===
- Angkasapuri lends its name to the Angkasapuri KTM station, located just across the NPE from the complex's main gate. It is linked by a pedestrian bridge.

== Incidents ==
On 20 July 1971, Mohamed Said Manoh, a 24-year-old soldier was fined $500 (RM2,360) and sentenced to three months of jail for abusing his military authority by assaulting a clerk, Wang Chui Chong at the Angkasapuri building when Said was on sentry duty at the building on 4 March 1971. He pleaded guilty on the charges.

On 21 December 1976, a room of the third floor of Wisma Radio at the Angkasapuri building was caught in a fire, which is said to be caused by the short-circuit.

On 2 January 1990, a bomb hoax caused all staff to evacuate from Angkasapuri. A man called to RTM, claiming that the bomb was on the second floor of the main building. Police tried to search for the bomb for two hours but failed. The hoax caused RTM to increase security for its buildings across Malaysia to protect its vital telecommunication equipment.

In February 1991, a heavy thunderstorm causes power supply to Angkasapuri affected and causing traffic to almost standstill in several parts of Kuala Lumpur.

Another bomb scare occurred on 27 January 1992 at the building during the telecast of the Anugerah Seri Angkasa 1991 awards ceremony was held. The hoax is believed made through a phone call by an anonymous person who warned the bomb threat. The awards were cancelled following the threat but resumed on 30 January.

== See also ==
- List of concert halls in Malaysia
