= List of programs broadcast by Aniplus Asia =

This is a list of television programming that are currently being broadcast or have been broadcast on Aniplus and Aniplus Asia in Singapore, Hong Kong, Indonesia, Philippines and Thailand.

== Current and former programming ==
- 2.43: Seiin High School Boys Volleyball Team
- ACCA: 13-Territory Inspection Dept.
- Afterlost
- Aho-Girl
- Angels of Death
- Arifureta: From Commonplace to World's Strongest
- Assassins Pride
- Attack on Titan
- Attack on Titan: Junior High
- Back Arrow
- Berserk (2016)
- Big Order
- Blood Blockade Battlefront
- Boogiepop and Others
- Bottom-tier Character Tomozaki
- B-Project -Zeccho*Emotion-
- Bungo Stray Dogs
- New Cardfight!! Vanguard
- Cardfight!! Vanguard: overDress
- Cautious Hero: The Hero Is Overpowered but Overly Cautious
- Celestial Method
- Cestvs: The Roman Fighter
- Chronicles of the Going Home Club
- Croisée in a Foreign Labyrinth
- D_Cide Traumerei: The Animation
- D4DJ First Mix
- Darling in the Franxx
- Deca-Dence
- Detective Opera Milky Holmes
- Diabolik Lovers
- Didn't I Say to Make My Abilities Average in the Next Life?!
- Drifters
- Endride
- Ensemble Stars!
- ERASED
- Fanfare of Adolescence
- Fate/Grand Order (Only Aired First Order and Moonlight/Lostroom)
- Fire Force
- Future Card Buddyfight Ace
- Galilei Donna
- GJ Club
- Glasslip
- Granblue Fantasy The Animation
- Hanayamata
- Haruchika
- Hozuki's Coolheadedness
- Hypnosis Mic: Division Rap Battle: Rhyme Anima
- Is It Wrong to Try to Pick Up Girls in a Dungeon?
- Isekai Quartet
- Kakushigoto
- Kamisama Dolls
- Kantai Collection
- Katsugeki/Touken Ranbu
- Kemono Friends
- Kemono Michi: Rise Up!
- Kids on the Slope
- Kingdom (Only Season 3-4)
- Kiznaiver
- Knights of Sidonia
- Lycoris Recoil
- Magia Record
- Mashiroiro Symphony
- Miss Kobayashi's Dragon Maid
- Myriad Colors Phantom World
- Natsuyuki Rendezvous
- Nekopara
- Night Head 2041
- Norn9
- Occultic;Nine
- Okami-san and Her Seven Companions
- Oreimo
- Oreshura
- Our Last Crusade or the Rise of a New World
- Persona 5: The Animation
- Pikotaro's Lullaby LA LA BY!
- Ping Pong: The Animation
- Planet With
- Pop Team Epic
- Princess Connect! Re:Dive
- Prima Doll
- Psycho-Pass
- Puchimas! Petit Idolmaster
- RahXephon
- Rascal Does Not Dream of Bunny Girl Senpai
- Record of Grancrest War
- Release the Spyce
- Restaurant to Another World
- RobiHachi
- Robotics;Notes
- Rokka: Braves of the Six Flowers
- Saekano: How to Raise a Boring Girlfriend
- Samurai Flamenco
- School-Live!
- Selector Infected WIXOSS
- Selector Spread WIXOSS
- Shine Post
- Silver Spoon (Only Season 1)
- Stars Align
- Steins;Gate 0
- Sunday Without God
- Sweetness and Lightning
- Sword Oratoria
- takt op. Destiny
- Terror in Resonance
- The Ancient Magus' Bride
- The Case Study of Vanitas
- The Duke of Death and His Maid
- The Great Jahy Will Not Be Defeated!
- The House Spirit Tatami-chan
- The Idolmaster
- The Idolmaster Cinderella Girls
- The Idolmaster SideM
- The Irregular at Magic High School
- The Misfit of Demon King Academy
- The Perfect Insider
- The Promised Neverland
- The Rising of the Shield Hero
- The Vampire Dies in No Time
- Tokyo 24th Ward
- Tokyo Ghoul: re
- Tonari no Seki-Kun: The Master of Killing Time
- TONIKAWA: Over the Moon for You
- Trapped in a Dating Sim: The World of Otome Games is Tough for Mobs
- Touken Ranbu: Hanamaru
- Tower of God
- Trickster
- Tsuredure Children
- Tsurune
- Usagi Drop
- Uta no Prince-sama
- Utawarerumono: The False Faces
- Visual Prison
- Vividred Operation
- Vivy: Fluorite Eye's Song
- Wake Up, Girls!
- When Supernatural Battles Became Commonplace
- Wish Upon the Pleiades
- With a Dog AND a Cat, Every Day is Fun
- Zombie Land Saga
