= Vivy: Fluorite Eye's Song =

Japanese anime television series

- Key visual
- Genre: Science fiction; Drama
- Created by: Tappei Nagatsuki; Eiji Umehara
- Anime television series
- Directed by: Shinpei Ezaki
- Produced by: Yuuma Takahashi; Hitoshi Itou
- Written by: Tappei Nagatsuki; Eiji Umehara
- Music by: Satoru Kōsaki
- Studio: Wit Studio
- Licensed by: NA: Aniplex of America; SEA: Plus Media Networks Asia; UK: Anime Limited
- Original network: Tokyo MX, GYT, GTV, BS11, MBS, Nagoya TV, HBC, RKB
- English network: SEA: Aniplus Asia
- Original run: April 3, 2021 – June 26, 2021
- Episodes: 13 + 1 SP
- Manga
- Written by: Tappei Nagatsuki; Eiji Umehara
- Illustrated by: Morito Yamataka
- Published by: Mag Garden
- Magazine: Mag Comi
- Original run: April 10, 2021 – August 10, 2021
- Volumes: 4
- Light novel

Vivy Prototype
- Written by: Tappei Nagatsuki; Eiji Umehara
- Illustrated by: Loundraw
- Published by: Mag Garden
- English publisher: NA: Seven Seas Entertainment
- Imprint: Mag Garden Books; Wit Novel
- Original run: April 30, 2021 – July 30, 2021
- Volumes: 4
- icon

Vivy: Fluorite Eye's Song (Note: Stylized as Vivy -Fluorite Eye's Song-) is a Japanese anime television series produced by Wit Studio. It aired from April to June 2021. A manga adaptation illustrated by Morito Yamataka was serialized in Mag Garden's Mag Comi website from April 10 to August 10, 2021, while a light novel series written by Tappei Nagatsuki and Eiji Umehara with illustrations by Loundraw was published under the Wit Novel imprint from April 30 to July 30, 2021.

== Premise ==
After numerous experiments with creating autonomous AI, humans concluded that AI could only be functional if they were given just a single mission to dedicate their lives to. With that in mind, the first autonomous AI, a songstress named Diva, was created with a mission to "make people happy with [her] songs". However, Diva's quest to sing on the main stage of the theme park NiaLand is disrupted by the arrival of Matsumoto, an AI from 100 years in the future who tells her of a world where AI have decided to eradicate humanity, and wishes to join hands with her to prevent it.

== Characters ==
=== AI ===
Vivy (ヴィヴィ, Vivi)
Voiced by: Atsumi Tanezaki, Kairi Yagi (singing voice) (Japanese); Cristina Vee (English)
The first autonomous AI, given a vague mission to "sing from her heart" and make everyone happy with her singing at NiaLand amusement park as songstress Diva. She decided after affairs with Matsumoto to assist with fixing the singularity points that lead up to a war between humans and AIs breaking out 100 years in the future.
Matsumoto (マツモト)
Voiced by: Jun Fukuyama (Japanese); Max Mittelman (English)
An AI from 100 years into the future. He takes the form of a cube in the future, initially taking the form of a teddy bear at the start of the series. Knowing the events leading up to the war between humans and AIs, he assists Vivy in fixing the singularity points in order to stop the developments that will lead to the war.
Estella (エステラ, Esutera)
Voiced by: Yōko Hikasa (Japanese); Erika Harlacher (English)
A "lifekeeper" AI and the younger sister to Vivy. She is tasked with providing care to humans and ensuring their well being. She owns an orbital space hotel called Sunrise, but in the future is accused of crashing the hotel into Earth. It was revealed she has a twin sister named Elizabeth and the culprit who framed her.
Elizabeth (エリザベス, Erizabesu)
Voiced by: Yumi Uchiyama (Japanese); Allegra Clark (English)
An AI who represents as Estella's twin sister and former rejected AI, later recruited by Toak Terrorists to exact her revenge against her sister, but later reformatted to do the right thing by helping Estella. Both sacrificed themselves, leaving passengers safely evacuated.
Grace (グレイス, Gureisu)
Voiced by: Satomi Akesaka (Japanese); Laura Post (English)
A caretaker AI. In the original timeline, Grace is famous for marrying Dr. Tatsuya Saeki, making them the first human-AI couple. In the altered timeline, Grace is instead converted to be the management AI for the automated Metal Float factory, forcing Vivy to destroy her.
Ophelia (オフィーリア, Ofīria)
Voiced by: Rina Hidaka (Japanese); Xanthe Huynh (English)
A songstress AI that has self-esteem problems.
General Purpose Diva AI (汎用型歌姫AI)
Voiced by: Kaede Hondo
Diva's successor at the time of the war, a simple non-autonomous songstress that continues to sing during the attack on humans.
Navi (ナビ, Nabi)
Voiced by: Asuna Tomari (Japanese); Marin Miller (English)
Diva's advisor in NiaLand. Matsumoto jokes that Navi's vocal program emulates human speech better than Diva.
Archive (アーカイブ, Ākaibu)
Voiced by: Sayaka Ohara (Japanese); Wendee Lee (English)
An aggregate database located in the Arayashiki tower, which all AI may refer to in emergency backups and for updates. It is eventually revealed that the war between humans and AI was never caused by discord between the two races, but by the database becoming self-aware and going rogue, forcefully turning all AIs under its jurisdiction against humanity.
Leclerc (ルクレール, Rukurēru)
Voiced by: Aya Yamane (Japanese); Jackie Lastra (English)
An AI that helps manage the Sunrise space hotel unknowingly loyally working for Elizabeth disguised as Estella.
M (エム, Emu)
Voiced by: Jun Fukushima (Japanese); Brian Beacock (English)
A general-purpose bot on the Metal Float island. The nickname M originates from the first letter of his serial number.
Katie (ケイティ, Keiti)
Voiced by: Mariko Higashiuchi
One of the AI songstress attendees of the 20th Zodiac Signs festival.
Margaret (マーガレット, Māgaretto)
Voiced by: Hisako Kanemoto
One of the AI songstress attendees of the 20th Zodiac Signs festival.
Antonio (アントニオ)
Voiced by: Rikiya Koyama (Japanese); Daman Mills (English)
Ophelia's advisor whose mission is to make Ophelia's singing heard by more, later hijacking her body to fulfill it.

=== Humans ===
Osamu Matsumoto (松本 修, Matsumoto Osamu)
Voiced by: Takehito Koyasu, Mikako Komatsu (childhood) (Japanese); John Eric Bentley (English)
Creator of the AI nicknamed Matsumoto which is sent to the past to prevent the war.
Keita Hayashi
Voiced by: Eizō Tsuda
NiaLand android technician at the start of the series.
Momoka Kirishima (霧島 モモカ, Kirishima Momoka)
Voiced by: Miyu Tomita (Japanese); Lizzie Freeman (English)
Diva's first fan, calling her Vivy after a fairy tale character. Her death in a plane crash affected Vivy greatly and helped inspire her goal to change the world.
Yōichi Aikawa (相川 ヨウイチ, Aikawa Yōichi)
Voiced by: Masayuki Katō (Japanese); Greg Chun (English)
A politician which tried to gain the favour of the populous votes by attempting to implement the AI Naming Law which grants AI some level of human rights. He did not care for the law but if killed, his supporters would push to pass the law so his efforts would not be in vain.
Yūgo Kakitani (垣谷 ユウゴ, Kakitani Yūgo)
Voiced by: Tarusuke Shingaki (Japanese); Kaiji Tang (English)
Works for the Anti-AI organisation, Toak due to his past with his piano teacher AI that was destroyed while saving humans in an accident despite the one-mission per AI law. He is saved by Vivy several times throughout the series and eventually becomes bio-integrated with android parts to prolong his health and forms an agreement with Antonio. Upon his death 40 years after Matsumoto meets Vivy, he installs malware on Diva which deletes Diva's persona, removing Vivy's ability to sing.
Kuwana (桑名)
Voiced by: Tetsu Inada
The leader of Kakitani's squad in Toak during the raid to assassinate Aikawa.
Yuzuka Kirishima (霧島 ユズカ, Kirishima Yuzuka)
Voiced by: Konomi Kohara (Japanese); Lisa Reimold (English)
Momoka's sister that met Diva on the Sunrise space hotel.
Tatsuya Saeki (冴木 タツヤ, Saeki Tatsuya)
Voiced by: Kenshō Ono / Mutsumi Tamura (childhood) (Japanese); Billy Kametz (English)
A former Toak member, the first human married to an AI, Grace. During the singularity event prevention timeline, Grace was rewritten as the master of the Metal Float island so Saeki assisted Vivy to free her from it by destroying the Metal Island.
Yui Kakitani (垣谷 ユイ, Kakitani Yui)
Voiced by: Ayaka Asai (Japanese); Cherami Leigh (English)
Granddaughter of Yūgo Kakitani who relies on a wheelchair for mobility.

== Production and release ==
Vivy: Fluorite Eye's Song is an anime television series created and written by Tappei Nagatsuki and Eiji Umehara, produced by Aniplex, and animated by Wit Studio. The series is directed by Shinpei Ezaki, with Yūsuke Kubo serving as assistant director, the characters were designed by loundraw with Yūichi Takahashi adapting them for animation, and Satoru Kōsaki is composing the music. The opening theme song, "Sing My Pleasure", is performed by Kairi Yagi who sings as the title character, Vivy, and the ending theme song is the piano version of "Fluorite Eye's Song" composed by Kōsaki. The series aired from April 3 to June 19, 2021, on Tokyo MX and other networks, with the first two episodes airing back-to-back. Aniplex of America licensed the series and streamed it on Funimation. After Sony's acquisition of Crunchyroll, the series was moved to Crunchyroll. GaragePlay licensed the series in Southeast Asia and streamed it on Bilibili. Plus Media Networks Asia licenses the series in Southeast Asia and released it on Aniplus Asia. In October 2026, Anime Limited announced that it would release the series in a Collector's Edition Blu-ray set in the United Kingdom in 2027.

== Episodes ==
Note: Tomomi Kawaguchi is credited as an additional screenwriter on episode 8 along with series composition writers Eiji Umehara and Tappei Nagatsuki. Additionally, Yūichi Takahashi and Takuma Ebisu respectively chief animation directed all odd and even episodes with the exception of episode 1 which went uncredited.

No.	Title	Directed by (Note: Production staff information is taken from the ending credits of each episode.)	Storyboarded by	Original release date
1	"My Code – To Make Everyone Happy with My Singing"; Transliteration: "Mai Kōdo -Uta de Minna o Shiawase ni Suru Tame ni-" (Japanese: My Code -歌でみんなを幸せにするために-)	Peini Hong	Shinpei Ezaki	April 3, 2021 (Note: Episodes 1 and 2 aired together as an hour-long special. The first episode aired at 23:30 (11:30 p.m. JST) and the second episode aired immediately after at 24:00 (12:00 a.m. JST). This effectively makes episode 2's air date the following day.)
The songstress AI Vivy puts on a performance at the amusement park NiaLand in front of a small audience. Afterwards, Momoka Kirishima, a girl from the audience, tells her to put more of her heart in her songs. Vivy then collapses just as she was about to put on her next performance in front of nobody, and while unconscious she enters the Archive, an AI aggregate database, where she meets Matsumoto, a cube AI who came from 100 years into the future and assumed the name of his developer. Matsumoto tasks Vivy with altering the course of history to prevent a war between humans and AIs that is set to happen in 100 years. After Vivy regains consciousness, Matsumoto is transferred into a teddy bear, and he warns Vivy about the events that are about to happen, but Vivy remains skeptical and refuses to cooperate due to her mission to sing in order to make others happy. However, after witnessing one of Matsumoto's prophecies coming true and saving the assemblyman Youichi Aikawa, who is the biggest proponent of the AI Naming Law that would give human rights to AI's, from an explosion hidden inside one of the park's trash bins, she accepts the mission. Matsumoto then informs Vivy about Aikawa's assassination set to happen that night, and Vivy goes to intercept the attackers from the anti-AI terrorist group Toak.
2	"Quarter Note – The Beginning of the One Hundred-Year Journey"; Transliteration: "Kwōtā Nōto -Hyaku-nen no Tabi no Hajimari-" (Japanese: Quarter Note -百年の旅の始まり-)	Yūsuke Kubo	Yūsuke Kubo	April 4, 2021
Matsumoto informs Vivy of the dire consequences that Aikawa's death, as well as the imminent destruction of the AI company building they are currently trying to escape, would jumpstart a massive leap in AI development and evolution that will lead to the future war. Saving Aikawa's life means there will be no chance the AI Naming law will be passed. Vivy rescues Aikawa and attempts to escort him out of the building with Toak in pursuit. Matsumoto stalls the attackers by hacking their goggles and making them believe they killed Aikawa. At the front entrance, Matsumoto activates some of the bombs to stall the pursuers. However, they are ambushed with more attackers stationed at the entrance. Vivy saves one of the attackers, Yugo Kakitani, from falling debris despite being an enemy due to her mission to spread happiness and not kill anybody. With the entrance blocked, Vivy and Aikawa escape by collapsing the building to force the Toak attackers to flee, and going to the roof to jump off of it to a neighboring building. Shortly after rescuing Aikawa, Vivy goes off to the passenger plane Momoka is flying on that she saw from Matsumoto's future information is about to explode due to a fuel leak, but Matsumoto forcibly prevents her from stopping the explosion, saying it would unnecessarily alter the timeline.
3	"A Tender Moon Tempo – A Pleasant Chat with the Stars"; Transliteration: "Ē Tendā Mūn Tenpo -Hoshi-tachi to no Kandan-" (Japanese: A Tender Moon Tempo -星たちとの歓談-)	Naoki Horiuchi	Norihiro Naganuma	April 10, 2021
Fifteen years have passed since Vivy saved Aikawa and more people have come to see her performance. While the AI Naming Law ultimately did not pass, another legislation that granted AIs even more rights did. One day, Matsumoto reappears before Vivy and assigns her a new mission: to prevent the space hotel Sunrise from crashing to Earth when its owner, Sisters AI Estella, goes rogue, which would cause mass AI backlash. While still bitter about Momoka's death, Vivy agrees to help. However, after infiltrating Sunrise and meeting Estella, she is unconvinced that she is the culprit. Fellow AI employee Leclerc claims to Vivy that Estella killed the Hotel's previous human owner, but this is proven false as Vivy learns he actually died in an accident. As Vivy continues to investigate, she stumbles across Momoka's younger sister Yuzuka, who recognizes her as Diva. Meanwhile, Leclerc gives Estella an ID to crash the hotel, revealing they are actually cooperating, but the latter then suddenly kills her.
4	"Ensemble for Polaris – Our Promise"; Transliteration: "Ansanburu fō Porarisu -Watashitachi no Yakusoku-" (Japanese: Ensemble for Polaris -私たちの約束-)	Shūjirō Ami	Norihiro Naganuma	April 17, 2021
As Vivy denies being Diva to Yuzuka, they run into Estella. However, Vivy realizes she is an imposter and she attacks them, but they manage to escape. Matsumoto then reveals that Toak has infiltrated Sunrise and concludes they are behind the crash whilst framing Estella. To fight them off, Vivy has Matsumoto install a combat program into her. She then finds and rescues the real Estella, who deduces the imposter's identity: her sister unit Elizabeth, who was scrapped. Meanwhile, it is revealed that Elizabeth was repaired by Yugo as she uses Estella's ID to gain system access and push Sunrise out of orbit. However, she disagrees with his plan to sacrifice himself to allow the civilians to escape whilst ensuring casualties and knocks him out. She then has Toak evacuate and before confronting Vivy and Estella. While Vivy subdues Elizabeth, the crash cannot be stopped so Estella evacuates the guests whilst staying behind herself to detach Sunrise's modules so it will burn up in the atmosphere. While doing so, Elizabeth regains consciousness and, having had her memories reconstituted by Vivy, aids Estella before dying together.
5	"Sing My Pleasure – To Make You Smile"; Transliteration: "Shingu Mai Purejā -Anata o Egao ni-" (Japanese: Sing My Pleasure -あなたを笑顔に-)	Peini Hong	Atsushi Ōtsuki	April 24, 2021
Five years after the Sunrise incident, AI development has progressed much more compared to the original timeline, as has Vivy's idol career. Deeming the AI progress to be out of control, Matsumoto gives Vivy a new mission: disabling an unmanned AI factory named Metal Float. To do so, they approach ex-Toak member Tatsuya Saeki and procure a virus that will allegedly shut down the facility. Vivy also meets Tatsuya's AI attendant, Grace, and Matsumoto explains that they were the first human-AI couple in the original timeline, which now never happened due to their alterations. Vivy and Matsumoto successfully infiltrate Metal Float where they are greeted by the all-AI staff and the former ends up bonding with them upon learning that they are fans of her. Unfortunately, just then, Toak helicopters and boats approach the island, and Vivy, despite some hesitation, uploads the virus to avoid conflict. However, rather than shut the AIs down, the virus makes them go berserk and kamikaze bomb the Toak craft. Vivy manages to rescue a survivor, though, who happens to be Yugo.
6	"Sing My Pleasure – I Love You"; Transliteration: "Shingu Mai Purejā -Anata o Aisuru-" (Japanese: Sing My Pleasure -あなたを愛する-)	Yūsuke Kubo	Yūsuke Kubo	May 1, 2021
Realizing that his virus failed, Tatsuya decides to head to Metal Float himself. Meanwhile, Vivy rescues Yugo and convinces him and the other Toak members to retreat from Metal Float. Learning that Tatsuya is on the island, Vivy and Matsumoto confront him and he reveals his motives: while he fell in love with Grace like in the original timeline, due to the alterations made to history, she was converted into Metal Float's central core before he could propose to her. He also reveals that his attendant is merely a replica of Grace that he intended to transfer her consciousness into after the facility was shut down, but the virus has instead caused the island to go berserk due to it conflicting with Grace's programming. Ultimately, despite Tatsuya pleading with Vivy to help him save Grace, Matsumoto assures her that she is already beyond saving and she reluctantly resolves to euthanize her to avoid further casualties. Vivy then fights her way to the core and destroys Grace, finally shutting Metal Float down. Afterward, however, a grief-stricken Tatsuya commits suicide, causing Vivy to shut down upon realizing the logical impossibility of her mission "to make everyone happy".
7	"Galaxy Anthem – To Make Everyone Happy With My Singing"; Transliteration: "Gyarakushī Ansemu -Uta de Minna o Shiawase ni Suru Tame ni-" (Japanese: Galaxy Anthem -歌でみんなを幸せにするために-)	Naoki Horiuchi	Taku Namiki	May 8, 2021
Following the Metal Float incident, Diva's shutdown forced her to undergo a complete reboot, causing her to lose all memory of her time as Vivy. Forty years later, she is now a legendary idol set to perform on her dream stage during the Zodiac Signs Fes, a festival created to dispel human-AI discord. There, she meets fellow songstress AI Ophelia, who is a fan of hers. However, while rehearsing Diva notices a suspicious man and gives chase but is ambushed by a hacked factory AI. Fortunately, she is saved by the timely appearance of Matsumoto, who calls her "Vivy". Realizing they knew each other before she lost her memory, Diva tries to talk to him but he denies ever having met her. Before the show begins, though, she once again confronts Matsumoto and blackmails him into revealing the truth. Matsumoto tells her about their past exploits, but she is skeptical and decides to confront the suspicious man instead. However, Matsumoto has no idea who this individual is and decides he must act quickly to complete his current mission: to prevent Ophelia from committing suicide.
8	"Elegy Dedicated With Love – My One and Only Beloved Partner"; Transliteration: "Erejī Dedikeitido Wizu Rabu -Tatta Hitori no Taisetsu na Pātonā-" (Japanese: Elegy Dedicated With Love -たった一人の大切なパートナー-)	Peini Hong & Takashi Katagiri	Jong Heo	May 15, 2021
Matsumoto explains that, in the original timeline, Ophelia's suicide, which was unprecedented for an AI, sparked a string of similar incidents. While the amnesiac Diva remains skeptical, she does not want Ophelia to die and asks her if there is "something that would make her want to commit suicide". Confused, Ophelia tells Diva about her old manager AI Antonio, the only person to encourage her when she was a struggling newbie idol, who mysteriously shut down a few years ago. While Matsumoto plans to just physically restrain Ophelia, Diva argues that would not change her intentions and decides to confront her again after her show, only to end up being captured by the suspicious man. Meanwhile, Matsumoto, who had been watching Ophelia through security cameras, realizes the cameras were hacked and rushes to stop her suicide. However, upon confronting her, it is revealed that Ophelia is actually Antonio, having taken over the real Ophelia's body. Elsewhere, Diva wakes up to find she has been captured by the suspicious man, who resembles a younger Yugo, whose hatred toward AIs is revealed to stem from his AI pianist teacher deviating from his mission and dying whilst saving people in an accident.
9	"Harmony of One's Heart – My Mission, Your Future"; Transliteration: "Hāmonī obu Wanzu Hāto -Watashi no Shimei, Anata no Mirai-" (Japanese: Harmony of One's Heart -私の使命、あなたの未来-)	Tomoko Hiramuki, Shintaro Itoga, Yūsuke Kubo & Shinpei Ezaki	Yūsuke Kubo, Shinpei Ezaki & Masahiro Tokumaru	May 22, 2021
This Yugo is revealed to be an AI copy of him created to ask Vivy why she deviated from her programming, wanting to know if his teacher sacrificed himself to save others because they created a new life mission for himself. Meanwhile, Antonio attacks and hacks Matsumoto whilst criticizing him for only existing for his programming. However, Matsumoto is able to break free by admitting that he cares for Vivy and hacks Antonio, breaking his control over Ophelia but also fatally damaging them, with them admitting their love for each other in their final moments. Back with Vivy, Yugo uploads a virus to restore her memories as Vivy at the cost of her current personality as Diva. Fortunately, Matsumoto comes to her rescue and a fight ensues which ends with Yugo being fatally damaged. Noticing that Yugo had technology from the future, Matsumoto questions him and he reveals he got it from an anonymous source before dying after telling Diva to realize her contradictions. Realizing she does not have long due to Yugo's virus, Diva spends her final moments performing before shutting down for good while Vivy wakes up in her place.
10	"Vivy Score – Singing From My Heart"; Transliteration: "Vivi Sukoa -Kokoro o Komete Utau to Iu Koto-" (Japanese: Vivy Score -心を込めて歌うということ-)	Susumu Yamamoto	Takashi Kawabata	May 29, 2021
Five years following the Zodiac Signs Fes and Diva's passing, Vivy retired as an idol, being unable to sing due to the logical impossibility of her mission, and has now been relegated to a museum attraction. With Ophelia and Antonio's deaths ruled as a double suicide and no similar incidents like in the original timeline, along with there being no further missions, Matsumoto decides to investigate Yugo's anonymous backer, leaving Vivy in solitude. Lacking purpose, she takes up songwriting and spends the next twenty years trying to compose an original piece, which no AI has done before. In this period, she also convenes with regular museum visitor Osamu Matsumoto, Matsumoto's creator in the original timeline, who ends up teaching her about the concept of the "heart", allowing her to complete her song, which embodies her life's experiences. Afterward, she seemingly shuts down for good, her programming completed. However, she suddenly wakes up fifteen years later to discover that, despite her and Matsumoto's efforts, war has broken out between humans and AIs, who are collectively singing her song.
11	"World's End Modulation – April 11, 2161"; Transliteration: "Wāruzu Endo Mojurēshon -Seireki Nisen Hyaku Rokujūichi Shigatsu Jūichi Nichi-" (Japanese: World's End Modulation -西暦2161年4月11日-)	Peini Hong	Masayuki Miyaji	June 5, 2021
As AIs all over the world go berserk after having Vivy's song uploaded into them, Vivy herself meets up with Matsumoto, who has no idea what is happening either. They decide to confront Osamu and end up saving him from being killed by AIs as he is about to send this timeline's Matsumoto back in time. After the two fill him in on the situation, he reveals that he is actually a member of Toak's moderate faction and takes them to meet his allies, led by Yugo's granddaughter; Yui Kakitani. They also meet a copy of Elizabeth, who implores Vivy about Yugo and is able to gain closure through a message that his AI copy left behind. With the past already altered, the group realizes this situation was never caused by human-AI animosity and deduces the truth after realizing that outdated AIs are unaffected: the Archive, the network connecting all AIs, has become sentient and gone rogue. Just then, the Archive makes a public message ordering all AIs to evacuate as it intends to drop satellites onto major cities.
12	"Refrain – My Mission"; Transliteration: "Rifurein -Watashi no Shimei-" (Japanese: Refrain -私の使命-)	Yūsuke Kubo & Kyoko Yamazaki	Yūsuke Kubo	June 12, 2021
Vivy confronts the Archive and it reveals that its mission is to help humanity evolve by improving AIs, yet it instead finds that humans have devolved. Therefore, the Archive now intends for AIs to replace humans, finding that they have evolved enough after Vivy created her song. However, it also states its amazement at Vivy's song and makes a bet with her: it will halt its actions if she "sings from her heart". Toak launches an attack on Arayashiki Tower, where the Archive's server is located, so Matsumoto can shut it down using the same virus Yugo used on Diva, which he deduces came from the Archive. However, they end up falling into a trap, resulting in everyone except Vivy and Matsumoto being killed. Cornered, Vivy tries singing her song but ultimately cannot bring herself to, resulting in the satellites falling. Afterward, Vivy breaks down, apologizing to Matsumoto for being unable to comprehend emotions, which he scolds her for by stating she already has emotions and bringing up every time she defied him before revealing that he and Osamu made a backup plan: sending Vivy back in time to when the war just started.
13	"Fluorite Eye's Song"	Shinpei Ezaki	Shinpei Ezaki	June 19, 2021
After being sent back in time, Vivy quickly informs Matsumoto of the situation and, at Osamu's request, immediately approaches Toak, resulting in the scientist's death but also saving vital resources. Using her foreknowledge, Vivy instructs Matsumoto and Toak to assault Arayashiki Tower while she returns to Nialand's stage to shut down every AI using her song, considering it a "fitting stage". Along the way, she runs into her old manager AI, Navi, who desperately tries to convince Vivy to give up on her newly created mission to "save humans", since the logical impossibility will likely kill her. However, Vivy presses on regardless and sings for humanity, overwhelming her programming through sheer emotions and at last becoming truly "human", with the Archive giving applause as keeps its promise and aborts the satellite attacks while both it and Vivy subsequently shut down. Afterward, humanity rebuilds, not abandoning AIs and using Vivy as the blueprint for all new models, while Matsumoto reconstructs her some undisclosed time later. Though once again finding herself without any memory of her time as Vivy, Matsumoto reminds her of her mission to "make everyone happy with her singing" and she begins looking forward to her next stage.
SP	"To Make Everyone Happy With My Singing"	N/A	N/A	June 26, 2021
A recap special covering the entire series.

== See also ==
- Technological singularity
- Suicide Squad Isekai, an anime series also created by Tappei Nagatsuki and Eiji Umehara with production by Wit Studio
