= Kairi Yagi =

Japanese singer-songwriter

- 八木 海莉
- Born: September 5, 2002 (age 24); Hiroshima Prefecture, Japan
- Occupations: Singer; songwriter
- Years active: 2018–present
- Musical career
- Genres: J-pop; anison
- Label: Ki/oon Music

YouTube information
- Channel: 八木海莉
- Years active: 2018–present
- Genre: Music
- Subscribers: 137 thousand
- Views: 17.5 million
- Last updated: September 4, 2022
- Website: 八木海莉 Official Site

Kairi Yagi (八木 海莉, Yagi Kairi; born September 5, 2002) is a Japanese singer-songwriter from Hiroshima Prefecture affiliated with the Sony Music Artists agency. She major-debuted in 2021 with the Japanese record label Ki/oon Music.

== Career ==
=== Early years ===
Kairi Yagi was born in Hiroshima Prefecture on September 5, 2002. She started to learn dancing when she was young. At the suggestion of her aunt, she joined Actor's School Hiroshima by passing the solo audition when she was in fifth grade. She continued through her time in junior high school. She also took some private vocal lessons during that time.

Next year, in the school presentation, she was spotted by people in the industry who later recommend she take part in an audition in Tokyo. During the audition, she realized how comfortable singing could be and wants to be an artist that can sing and dance. Meanwhile, she started to learn guitar because she wanted to learn new skills.

=== 2018–present ===
At age 15, after graduating from middle school, she moved to Tokyo alone to pursue her dream. While working part-time, attending high school, and taking voice training lessons, she began auditioning. While unsuccessful in her auditions, she started posting videos playing and singing on YouTube. At the suggestion of others, she started writing original songs at that time.

After two years of stressful living in Tokyo alone, she was given a great opportunity when she was selected as the singer of the main character Vivy from April 2021 TV-anime series Vivy: Fluorite Eye's Song. The theme song "Sing My Pleasure" was widely acclaimed, earning the No.1 spot on RecoChoku newcomers download charts for the first half of 2021.

At the same year, she made her debut with her first original single, "Ripe Aster", on December 18, 2021. The song is also the theme song of The Irregular at Magic High School Reminiscence Arc.

Her first one-man live "First One-Man Live-19-" and "First One-Man Live-20-" took place at September 4, 2021 and September 5, 2021.

At November 15, 2023, she released her second single "know me...". The song is also the ending theme song of Undead Unluck.

== Discography ==
=== Mini-albums ===
List of mini-albums, with selected details and chart positions
Title	Details	Peak chart positions
Title	Details	JPN
水気を謳う	Released: April 27, 2022 (JPN); Label: Ki/oon Music; Formats: CD, CD+Blu-ray, digital download	73

=== Singles ===
List of singles, with selected details and chart positions
Title	Details	Peak chart positions
Title	Details	JPN
"Ripe Aster"	Released: March 16, 2022 (JPN); Label: Ki/oon Music; Formats: CD+Blu-ray, digital download	33
"know me..."	Released: November 15, 2023 (JPN); Label: Ki/oon Music; Formats: CD+Blu-ray, digital download	38

== Filmography ==
=== TV animation ===
Year	Title	Role	Source
2021	Vivy: Fluorite Eye's Song	Vivy / Diva (Vocal)	
