= RTMKlik =

Malaysian over-the-top streaming service

- Former names: RTM Mobile (2012–2013); MyKlik (2013–2020)
- Website type: OTT
- Available in: Malay, English, Mandarin, Tamil
- Headquarters: Angkasapuri, Kuala Lumpur, Malaysia
- Owner: Radio Televisyen Malaysia (RTM)
- Creator: Interactive Digital Media Division (MDI)
- Website: rtmklik.rtm.gov.my
- Commercial: Yes
- Registration: Free
- Launched: 18 April 2012; 14 years ago
- Current status: Active

RTMKlik, formerly known as RTM Mobile and MyKlik, is a Malaysian digital video on demand service owned and operated by the Interactive Digital Media Division (MDI) of Radio Televisyen Malaysia (RTM). The service is available over-the-top on a wide range of devices, including mobile phones and tablets, personal computers and smart televisions.

It was launched on 18 April 2012 as an over-the-top media service and website RTM Mobile and MyKlik before took its present name in 2021. The service's website contains all RTM television channels and radio stations, as well as online parliament streaming channel RTM Parlimen and audio podcasts. As of September 2025, RTMKlik has reached over 64 million viewership.

== History ==
The platform was launched by the then-Information, Communications, Arts and Culture Minister, Rais Yatim on 18 April 2012.

On 1 January 2021, RTM MyKlik rebranded as RTMKlik. Its website URL also have been changed to rtmklik.rtm.gov.my.

In February 2023, RTMKlik is available for streaming internationally, especially in certain ASEAN countries including Singapore, Indonesia, Brunei, Thailand and the Philippines. The platform has reached 6.1 million downloads as of April 2025.

In conjunction with RTM's 80th anniversary on 1 April 2026, RTMKlik introduced some new contents, including the international contents.

== Content and programming ==
RTMKlik offers to worldwide audiences video streaming or on-demand content of programs from RTM's archived library as well as original webseries. In addition, it also offers live streaming of RTM's free-to-air channels, which is only available in Malaysia. It also offers catch-up TV for viewers to watch shows they have missed on prime time TV shows from the previous few days.

Programs are categorised by these genres:

- Arts
- Culture
- Comedy
- Documentary
- Drama
- Education
- Lifestyle
- News and current affairs
- Panel and discussion
- Regional
- Sports

=== Saluran Feeling Feeling ===
RTMKlik has also introduced a Free Ad-Supported Streaming Television (FAST) channel called "Saluran Feeling Feeling" in 2025. This new addition offers a stream of curated entertainment, reinforcing RTMKlik's commitment to accessible and diverse digital content.

Name	Availability	Language	Programming	24-hours
Apetito	RTMKlik	Malay and English	A channel dedicated to food lovers, featuring cooking shows, recipe tutorials, and culinary explorations of both local and international cuisine.	Yes
Aura	RTMKlik	Malay and English	Focused on women's interests, covering fashion, beauty, health, wellness, and inspiring stories that empower and uplift.	Yes
Fitrah	RTMKlik	Malay and English	A hub for Islamic content, including religious talks, Quranic recitations, educational programs, and spiritual reflections.	Yes
JR	RTMKlik	Malay and English	A fun and educational channel for kids, offering cartoons, learning programs, and entertaining content tailored for young viewers.	Yes
Lead	RTMKlik	Malay and English	A go-to source for news and current affairs, delivering updates on local and global events, business insights, and informative discussions.	Yes
Roll	RTMKlik	Malay and English	A celebration of Malaysian music, featuring both modern and traditional sounds, live performances, and behind-the-scenes exclusives.	Yes
Snap	RTMKlik	Malay and English	A travel-focused channel showcasing stunning destinations, cultural experiences, and adventure-filled explorations across Malaysia and beyond.	Yes

== See also ==
- Radio Televisyen Malaysia (RTM)
- Tonton
- Astro Go
- List of streaming media services
