= Aniplus =

South Korean television company

Aniplus Inc.
- Native name: 주식회사 애니플러스
- Romanized name: Jusighoesa Aniplus
- Formerly: SBN TV (2004–09)
- Type: Public
- Traded as: KRX: 310200
- ISIN: KR7310200001
- Industry: Entertainment; Retail; Event
- Founded: July 2004; 22 years ago
- Headquarters: Yeongdeungpo District, Seoul, South Korea
- Area served: South Korea, Southeast Asia, Hong Kong and Taiwan
- Key people: Seung-Taek Jeon (CEO); Kim Yu-seung (vice president)
- Products: Anime; Motion pictures; Korean drama; Merchandise; Pay television
- Services: Content distribution; Drama production; Brand licensing
- Revenue: ▲ ₩111.3 billion (2023)
- Operating income: ▲ ₩11.9 billion (2023)
- Net income: ▲ ₩10.3 billion (2023)
- Total assets: ▲ ₩199.6 billion (2023)
- Owner: JJ MediaWorks
- Parent: JJ MediaWorks (20.83%)
- Divisions: Aniplus Shop
- Subsidiaries: Plus Media Networks Asia; Media & Art; WeMad; NEGO Company (50%); Rowoon Company (67.11%); Laftel (43.88%); Animax Broadcasting Korea
- Website: company.aniplustv.com

Aniplus
- Broadcast area: Nationwide
- Headquarters: Yeongdeungpo District, Seoul, South Korea

Programming
- Picture format: 1080i HDTV

Ownership
- Owner: Aniplus Inc.

History
- Launched: December 7, 2009

Links
- Website: aniplustv.com

Aniplus Inc. (Korean: 주식회사 애니플러스; RR: Jusighoesa Aniplus) is a South Korean television channel and anime distributor. Founded in 2004, the company also operates different businesses including a video on demand platform and a merchandising arm in its own country.

Aniplus is owned by JJ MediaWorks, a VOD service provider. It distributes its programs outside its own platforms to clients such as Netflix and Coupang Play.

== History ==
First Aniplus logo from 2009–2020 (for South Korea) and 2013–2025 (for Southeast Asia)

The company originally started as a television station called SBN TV. Originally owned by C& Group, its parent company dissolved due to a liquidity crisis. JJ MediaWorks acquired the station in July 2009 and renamed the company to Aniplus Inc. the following month. The company launched the Aniplus television channel on December 7, 2009. Seung-Taek Jeon, the CEO of JJ MediaWorks, became the new CEO of Aniplus following the acquisition.

Aniplus launched an independent television feed for Southeast Asia called Aniplus Asia in 2013. The following year, Aniplus established its subsidiary Plus Media Networks Asia in Singapore to handle anime and Korean drama distribution for the Southeast Asian market.

In 2014, Aniplus entered the art exhibition business by establishing a subsidiary named Media & Art.

On February 7, 2020, Aniplus became listed on KOSDAQ. In the same month, the company fully acquired Korean drama production company WeMad to diversify its portfolio.

On February 4, 2022, advertising agency NEGO Company became a subsidiary of Aniplus.

On August 17, 2022, industrial design company Rowoon Company was acquired by Aniplus to strengthen its IP commercialization. Aniplus has 67.11% stake in the company.

On November 8, 2022, private equity firm Keistone Partners announced that it and Aniplus would jointly acquire 87% stake in animation streaming company Laftel Inc. from RIDI Corporation, the owner of Manta webtoon platform for 80 billion won. RIDI would invest 10 billion won in Aniplus to support the platform's growth. Aniplus owns 56.38% stake in Laftel, with 12.5% of it being a call option.

In April 2023, Aniplus had entered an acquisition deal of Animax, the second largest animation broadcaster and rival competitor in South Korea, with KC Global Media Entertainment. The deal was approved in June of the same year. The numbers were not disclosed, but sources close to the transaction suggested it was about 46 billion won. The deal made Aniplus the biggest anime distributor in South Korea.

On October 4, 2024, it was announced that Aniplus Korea will discontinue some of its key core services effective December 31 due to various internal and external factors including the changes in landscape of media environment that focuses more on its stronger business venture in the area. The services that may affect the discountinuation include its live broadcast, VOD streaming and download functionalities; while the rest of owned and operated assets such as Laftel, Animax Korea and other offerings will remain unaffected.

== Aniplus Shop ==
Aniplus Shop is the retailing division and collaboration cafe brand of Aniplus.

On April 28, 2017, Aniplus opened its first store in Hapjeong-dong, Seoul. In May 2021, it was reported that the company planned to expand its store to five cities across the country within the third and fourth quarters of the year.

On July 9, 2021, Aniplus Shop opened its second branch in Daejeon. The third location, located in Gwangju, was open on August 19, 2021. The latest store in Seomyeon, Busan was open on October 28, 2021.

== Plus Media Networks Asia ==
Plus Media Networks Asia Pte. Ltd. is a Singaporean subsidiary of Aniplus. It operates Aniplus Asia and a Korean entertainment channel named K+.

=== Aniplus Asia ===
Aniplus Asia
- Broadcast area: Singapore; Indonesia; Thailand
- Headquarters: Singapore

Programming
- Picture format: 1080i HDTV

Ownership
- Owner: Aniplus Inc.
- Parent: Plus Media Networks Asia
- Sister channels: K+

History
- Launched: January 16, 2013

Links
- Website: aniplus-asia.com

Aniplus Asia is a Southeast Asian anime pay television channel and anime distributor based in Singapore. It is a sister channel of Aniplus. Launched in January 2013, it is currently available in Singapore and Indonesia.

Most of Aniplus Asia programs come from its parent company Plus Media Networks Asia. The channel airs the notable anime series from Japan, which was premiered day-and-date. Notable series include Attack on Titan, The Promised Neverland, and Lycoris Recoil. Select programs are licensed from other distributors such as Medialink and Mighty Media.

==== Television channel ====
Aniplus Asia was first launched as part of Thai operator TOT IPTV's launch lineup on January 16, 2013. The channel was subsequently launched in Indonesia on Big TV in September of the same year. It was made available in Singapore on Toggle.sg (now meWatch) on November 6, 2013, and on Singtel TV on March 14, 2014.

In April 2017, the channel was launched in Malaysia exclusively on Astro Go. Sky Cable picked up the channel in the Philippines the following month. On May 25, 2018, Aniplus Asia was made available on Easy TV Home in the Philippines, but has ceased operations since September 30, 2019. In September 2018, the channel was added to Cablelink in the Philippines. Cignal added the channel to its lineup in the Philippines on January 4, 2020.

On April 1, 2021, Aniplus Asia ceased its transmission on Astro Go in Malaysia and Royal Cable in the Philippines after the contract had expired, However, the channel resurfaced on Royal Cable among other alternatives following the lack of channel lineups due to the closure of Disney-owned networks in the region.

In February 2023, Aniplus Asia appeared on Unifi TV as a video on demand channel alongside its sister channel K+. On May 1, 2023, the channel was removed from Sky Cable in the Philippines. Cablelink discontinued the channel in the Philippines on June 1, 2023.

The channel was sunset on AIS Play in Thailand from October 1, 2023., but Resume Airing on TrueID on 5 June 2025.

In the Philippines, Cignal shut down the channel on January 1, 2024.

==== Video on demand ====
In August 2015, Aniplus Asia partnered with OTT platform iflix to distribute its titles via its VOD service.

In September 2016, the channel was launched in Hong Kong on video streaming site Le.com. Later in November, it was picked up by streaming website Tribe in Indonesia, and reached the Philippines in December of the same year.

On July 25, 2017, Aniplus Asia announced that it has launched a VOD service on its website for residents in Singapore.

On November 23, 2020, the original Korean Aniplus counterpart announced that Aniplus Asia was made available on demand via Now TV. Now TV terminated the VOD channel on June 30, 2024.

As of 2024, Aniplus Asia has licensed its titles to other streaming services such as Amazon Prime Video, Bilibili, Catchplay+, Coupang Play, Crunchyroll, Disney+, HBO Max, iQIYI, Netflix, Viki, and WeTV.

As of September 19, 2025, it available for Samsung TV Plus FAST.

==== Free-to-air programming block ====
In June 2016, programming from Aniplus Asia started to be distributed in Thailand on free-to-air channel Now26 as a programming block via a partnership with Mediaplex International.

In January 2017, TV5 revived its ANiMEGA anime programming block with titles from Aniplus Asia. The block premiered with Attack on Titan: Junior High, Myriad Colors Phantom World and Kantai Collection, dubbed in Tagalog.

==== Merchandising ====
On July 25, 2017, Aniplus Asia announced that it has opened an online store for anime merchandise on its website.

==== Aniplus Cafe Singapore ====
Aniplus Cafe Singapore is a collaboration cafe located at Esplanade Mall, Singapore. It was officially open on November 29, 2019, with BanG Dream! being its first theme. The cafe also sells merchandise from various anime series.

=== K+ ===
K+ is a Southeast Asian pay television channel focused on Korean entertainment. It was launched on September 17, 2014.

== Anime X Game Festival ==
Anime X Game Festival
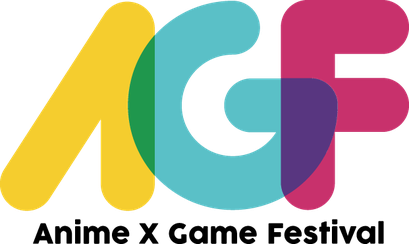
- Status: Active
- Genre: Anime; Manga; Webtoon; Video games
- Venue: Korea International Exhibition Center
- Locations: Goyang, Gyeonggi Province, South Korea
- Country: South Korea
- Inaugurated: November 3, 2018; 8 years ago
- Most recent: December 5, 2025; 11 months ago
- Attendance: ▲100,518 (2025)
- Organizer: Aniplus; Sony Music Entertainment Japan; Daewon Media (2022–); D&C Media (2022–)
- Website: agfkorea.com

Anime X Game Festival, abbreviated AGF, is a South Korean anime and video gaming convention held in Goyang, Gyeonggi Province, South Korea. Held for the first time in 2018, the convention is organized by Aniplus and Sony Music Entertainment Japan. The convention is held annually on a weekend in November or December at the Korea International Exhibition Center.

Due to the COVID-19 pandemic, the event was canceled in 2020 and 2021. The convention returned in 2022, with Daewon Media and D&C Media becoming its co-hosts alongside Aniplus and Sony Music Japan.

Much like other anime conventions, AGF features many events for attendees to take part in such as guest panels and concerts, as well as activities from exhibit booths and collaboration cafes.

=== AGF History ===
Dates	Location	Atten.	Guests
November 3–4, 2018	Korea International Exhibition Center; Goyang, Gyeonggi Province	20,000	Asca, halca, Kazuhiko Inoue, Ayako Kawasumi, Yoshitsugu Matsuoka, May'n, Miho Okasaki, Hinata Sato, Yosuke Shiokawa, Sphere, and Hiroki Takahashi.
December 14–15, 2019	Korea International Exhibition Center; Goyang, Gyeonggi Province	35,970	Aimi, DJ Kazu, May'n, Shoko Nakagawa, Sphere, and Nagi Yanagi.
December 3–4, 2022	Korea International Exhibition Center; Goyang, Gyeonggi Province	47,774	Yuya Hirose, Hironobu Kageyama, DJ Kazu, Yuka Nishio, Ayaka Ohashi, and Kensho Ono.
December 2–3, 2023	Korea International Exhibition Center; Goyang, Gyeonggi Province	65,442	Hina Aoki, Shintaro Asanuma, Junya Enoki, Saori Hayami, Ayako Kawasumi, DJ Kazu, Ayaka Ohashi, Nobuhiko Okamoto, Rumi Okubo, and Kana Ueda.
December 7–8, 2024	Korea International Exhibition Center; Goyang, Gyeonggi Province	72,081	Megumi Han, DJ Kazu, Hiroshi Kitadani, Akari Kito, Megumi Ogata, and Sumire Uesaka.
December 5–7, 2025	Korea International Exhibition Center; Goyang, Gyeonggi Province	100,518	Satomi Arai, Yuu Asakawa, Sayuri Date, Saori Hayami, Honoka Inoue, Ayako Kawasumi, DJ Kazu, Yusuke Kobayashi, Kazutaka Kodaka, Yuka Nishio, Masami Obari, Yuki Watanabe, and Yuzuki Watase.
December 4–6, 2026	Korea International Exhibition Center; Goyang, Gyeonggi Province		

== Other subsidiaries ==
=== Media & Art ===
Media & Art is an event management company specializing in art exhibition. In 2016, the company co-produced Korean drama series Secret Healer.

In June 2020, it was reported that Aniplus was developing exhibitions from webtoons and pursuing contracts overseas through the company. The following month, Media & Art opened a platform and art galleries under the name Groundseesaw. Groundseesaw produces exhibitions from domestic and international intellectual properties.

=== WeMad ===
WeMad is a South Korean drama production company founded on June 12, 2019, by Lee Hyun-wook, a former producer at Raemongraein (now Artist Studio). Its notable works include The Red Sleeve, Love Scene Number and Heartbeat.

WeMad was acquired by Aniplus in 2020.

=== Rowoon Company ===
Rowoon Company is an industrial design company. It handles goods production process including planning, design, manufacturing, distribution and operation. The company also has a brand licensing operation to produce and sell goods of licensed characters. Its subsidiary Rowoon Labs develops NFT and metaverse projects.

=== Laftel ===
Laftel is an animation streaming service. In addition to Japanese anime, the service also streams original Korean content and animated series adapted from webtoons. In 2022, it became a subsidiary of Aniplus and was reported to be expanding to Southeast Asia in the future. The service launched in Southeast Asia in January 2024.

=== Animax Broadcasting Korea ===
Animax Broadcasting Korea is the operating company of Animax, a South Korean anime television channel. It was originally owned by Sony Pictures Television International before being sold to KC Global Media Entertainment in 2020. The channel along with its operating company was then acquired by Aniplus in 2023.

== See also ==
- List of programs broadcast by Aniplus Asia
