= Animax (South Korean TV channel) =

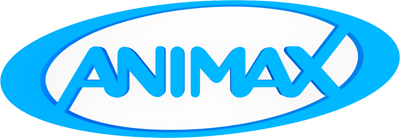
- Country: South Korea
- Broadcast area: South Korea
- Network: Animax
- Headquarters: Seoul

Programming
- Language: Korean
- Picture format: 1080i (HDTV)
- Timeshift service: +1

Ownership
- Owner: JJMediaWorks
- Parent: Animax Broadcasting Korea Co., Ltd. (Aniplus)

History
- Launched: April 29, 2006; 19 years ago

Links
- Website: www.animaxtv.co.kr

Animax is a South Korean television channel currently operated by JJMediaWorks' Aniplus that launched on April 29, 2006. Animax's primary programming is Japanese animated TV series films and Tokusatsu. The channel also broadcasts South Korean animated TV series under the South Korean regulations.

Animax was formerly operated jointly by Sony Pictures Television International (as a branch of the Japanese satellite network of the same name) and KT SkyLife, but was sold to KC Global Media in 2020. In 2023, the channel was sold again to its current owner.

Originally an exclusive channel to KT SkyLife satellite television subscribers, it made its debut on the other platform when it launched on KT's IPTV service Olleh TV.
