= K-Plus =

Southeast Asian pay television channel

K+
- Country: Singapore
- Broadcast area: Malaysia; Indonesia; Myanmar; Thailand
- Headquarters: Singapore

Programming
- Picture format: 1080i HDTV

Ownership
- Owner: Aniplus
- Parent: Plus Media Networks Asia
- Sister channels: Aniplus Asia

History
- Launched: 17 September 2014

Links
- Website: www.kplus-asia.com

K-Plus (stylized as K+) is a Southeast Asian pay television channel focused on airing drama series, variety shows, movies and lifestyle programmes in K-pop, beauty & fashion as its main programming genre. It was launched on 17 September 2014 and it is available in Indonesia, Malaysia, and Philippines. It also offers select titles to OTT platforms iflix, LeEco and Tribe. K+ is based in Singapore and is operated by Plus Media Networks Asia, a subsidiary of South Korea-based Aniplus.

== History ==
The channel was first launched in Indonesia in September 2014 on pay-TV provider K-Vision & Narasya TV (Malaysia, Indonesia) 2014) (now ceased since 2016 due to the carriage agreement, but now available on IndiHome since 2016 “ and Dens.TV since 2017).

In the Philippines, it was previously available on Easy TV Home (from May 25, 2018 until September 30, 2019), Sky Cable (April 2019 to May 1, 2023) and Cablelink (September 2018 till June 1, 2023) with Cignal eventually discontinued the channel operation (alongside its sister channel Aniplus) on January 1, 2024.

The channel is available on Unifi TV in Malaysia on October 1, 2021.

The channel was launched at Astro on May 18, 2022 (which the channel has previously appeared through their Astro GO app exclusively), while included on their prepaid satellite service NJOI in early June 9, 2022.
