= Astro Go =

Malaysian over-the-top streaming service

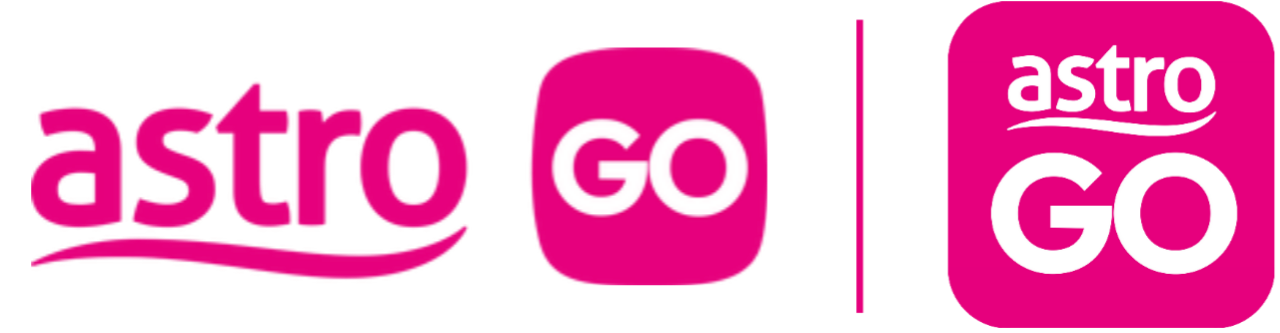
- Logo used since 2025
- Former name: Astro On-the-Go (2012–2017)
- Website type: OTT
- Available in: Malay, English, Mandarin, Tamil
- Headquarters: Bukit Jalil, Kuala Lumpur, {{{location_country}}}
- Area served: Nationwide
- Owner: Astro Malaysia Holdings
- Creator: Astro
- Website: astrogo.astro.com.my
- Commercial: Yes
- Registration: Free
- Launched: August 31, 2012; 14 years ago
- Current status: Active

Astro Go, formerly known as Astro On-the-Go, is a Malaysian digital video on demand service owned and operated by Astro Malaysia Holdings. The platform was launched on 31 August 2012 with its offerings include free-to-air and paid live broadcast, films and series, as well as Astro original programs. It is one of the three over-the-top streaming service operated by Astro Malaysia Holdings, the others being Sooka and the now-defunct NJOI Now. In 2019, Astro Go was recognized as the No. 1 video-on-demand service provider in Malaysia, surpassing Netflix and recorded a total of 2.2 million registered users with an average viewing time of 149 minutes per week.

== History ==
The platform was launched on 31 August 2012 as Astro On-the-Go. It was later made for international users in March 2013.

It was renamed as Astro Go on 31 March 2017 with several new features, such as a more user-friendly interface, improved video playback quality, and better content discovery tools.

On 8 July 2019, Astro Go went major revamp with a fresh look on its interface and new features.

Astro Go along with Astro On Demand went offline on 19 April 2022 due to technical issues, but went online a day later.

== See also ==
- Astro
- RTMKlik
- Tonton
- List of streaming media services
