= List of WIXOSS episodes =

The following is a list of episodes for anime series based on the WIXOSS franchise. The first series, selector infected WIXOSS, was produced by J.C.Staff in collaboration with Takara Tomy. The series follows a girl named Ruko Kominato who, upon discovering a living 'LRIG' named Tama, is chosen as a Selector who must battle other Selectors in a card game known as WIXOSS, with victors allegedly able to have their wishes granted. The first season aired in Japan between April 3, 2014, and June 19, 2014, and was simulcast by Funimation in North America and Crunchyroll in other territories outside Japan. The opening theme is "killy killy JOKER" by Kanon Wakeshima and the ending theme is "realize -Yume no Matsu Basho-" (realize -夢の待つ場所-, realize -Where Our Dreams Are Waiting-) by Cyua. A second season, titled selector spread WIXOSS, aired in Japan between October 4, 2014, and December 19, 2014. The opening theme is "world's end, girl's rondo" by Wakeshima, whilst the ending theme is "Undo -Ashita e no Kioku-" (Undo -明日への記憶-, Undo -A Memory For Tomorrow) by Cyua. A compilation film, selector destructed WIXOSS, was released on February 13, 2016.

A second series, titled Lostorage incited WIXOSS, aired in Japan between October 7, 2016, and December 23, 2016, and was simulcast by Crunchyroll. This series follows a girl named Suzuko Homura who, along with her LRIG Riru, finds herself in a new Selector battle in which her memories are placed on the line. The opening theme is "Lostorage" by Yuka Iguchi while the ending theme is "undeletable" by Cyua. The second part, Lostorage conflated WIXOSS, aired between April 6, 2018, and June 22, 2018. The opening theme is "Unlock" by Iguchi while the ending theme is "I" by Cyua.

A new television series titled WIXOSS Diva(A)Live, aired in Japan between from January 9, 2021, and March 27, 2021.

== Episode list ==
=== selector series (2014) ===
==== Season 1: infected WIXOSS ====
No.	Title (Note: English episode titles taken from Funimation.)	Original release date
1	"This Miracle Trembles"; Transliteration: "Kono Kiseki wa Kyōkyō" (Japanese: この奇跡は兢々)	April 3, 2014
Ruko Kominato, a girl who has yet to make any friends after transferring into her new home, receives a deck for a WIXOSS card game from her brother. Upon inspecting her cards, Ruko is shocked to find that her LRIG card, which serves as her avatar during matches, is able to speak and move. The next day, Ruko is approached by a schoolmate named Yuzuki Kurebayashi, who reveals she, like Ruko, is a 'Selector' with her own living LRIG, Hanayo. She reveals Selectors are chosen girls who have the chance to have a wish granted, but will lose such a chance if they are defeated three times in battles with other Selectors. Yuzuki challenges Ruko to a WIXOSS battle, being brought into a strange field where both Hanayo and Ruko's LRIG, which she decides to name Tama, are alive. After receiving some tips about the rules from Yuzuki's brother, Kazuki, Ruko manages to gain the upper hand against Yuzuki, before the match is interrupted by a teacher, resulting in a no-loss game. Prior to this, Yuzuki inadvertently yells out her wish concerning Kazuki, though assumes Ruko didn't hear it. Later that night, as Ruko is thankful to make a new friend, she is also concerned by how heavily into the battle Tama was.
2	"That Poisonous Meeting"; Transliteration: "Sono Deai wa Gekiyaku" (Japanese: その出会いは劇薬)	April 10, 2014
Whilst learning how LRIG's are capable of detecting other Selectors, Ruko and Yuzuki learn from Hanayo that model Akira Aoi is one such Selector. As they try to approach her at school, another Selector by the name of Hitoe Uemura challenges Akira to a WIXOSS battle instead, using their LRIGs Midoriko and Piruluk. Although Hitoe gets off to a good start, Akira, who reveals her true nature, overwhelms Hitoe by using her deck's ability to destroy her cards. After receiving further mental attacks from Akira, who manages to read that her wish is to make friends, Hitoe loses all will to fight and is defeated by Akira. The next day, as Ruko and Yuzuki attempt to avoid a confrontation with Akira, they spot Kazuki together with a card shopkeeper, Momoka, and assume they are dating, which causes Yuzuki to become upset and lash out at Ruko before running off. As Ruko is approached by Hitoe to request a battle, Akira appears before Yuzuki and challenges her to a battle.
3	"This Nonsensical Peace"; Transliteration: "Kono Heiwa wa Zaregoto" (Japanese: この平穏は戯言)	April 17, 2014
As Hitoe brings Ruko to the library for a battle, Yuzuki and Akira begin their battle as well, with Akira using the same tactics she used against Hitoe to learn of Yuzuki's wish, that she is in love with Kazuki, enraging her. As Ruko ponders if she should just let Hitoe win and grow further towards her wish, Tama states her desire to win, with Hitoe adding that she would not feel happy if Ruko lost on purpose. Hearing this, Ruko decides to give the battle all she has and wins the match, causing Tama to evolve into a stronger form. After the battle, Ruko asks Hitoe to become her friend, to which she responds that she'll think it over. Later that night, Ruko hears from Kazuki that Yuzuki hasn't returned home, with the two eventually finding her in a sorry state following a crushing defeat from Akira. Kazuki explains that he had met up with Momoka earlier to acquire a card for Yuzuki's deck, though Kazuki's kindness only serves to make Yuzuki feel more burdened inside. Meanwhile, as Akira vents her frustration over exactly when she will be able to have her wish granted, another model and Selector named Iona Urazoe is seen with an LRIG.
4	"That Wish is Blasphemy"; Transliteration: "Sono Inori wa Bōtoku" (Japanese: その祈りは冒涜)	April 24, 2014
Yuzuki comes round to Ruko's apartment to sleep over, hiding her true emotions in front of Ruko's grandmother before telling Ruko about her unfulfillable love. The next day, Ruko and Yuzuki run into Hitoe, who accepts Ruko's request to become friends with the both of them. As the three girls bond with each other via some non-Selector games of WIXOSS, Midoriko laments how she may be unneeded as Hitoe has fulfilled her own wish to have friends. Later, as Akira uses her popularity to sway the other students to deliver Ruko to her, Yuzuki helps her to escape, stating that she didn't want Akira to destroy Ruko's love for WIXOSS. Although Yuzuki tries to draw the pursuers away, Ruko is distracted by fears concerning her own desire to face Akira and ends up being discovered and brought to Akira's photoshoot. As Akira ends up getting pulled away due to her work, Iona appears before Ruko, labelling her desire to battle despite not having any wishes as 'blasphemy'.
5	"That Invalidated Vow"; Transliteration: "Ano Chikai wa Mukō" (Japanese: あの誓いは無効)	May 1, 2014
As Ruko, Yuzuki, and Hitoe decide to enter a WIXOSS party, Midoriko tells Hitoe that she should get rid of her or something might happen to Hitoe, but she refuses, as she considers Midoriko her friend too. Meanwhile, Ruko continues to be troubled by Iona's words. The next day, as Hitoe waits for the others, she is forced into a battle by a strong opponent. When Ruko and Yuzuki find Hitoe, they discover that she not only doesn't recognize them, but also receives pain from Ruko's touch. It is here that Hanayo reveals to Ruko and Yuzuki that Selectors who lose three times not only lose the chance to have their wish granted, but their wish becomes tainted, resulting in a curse opposite to that wish becoming inflicted upon them. In Hitoe's case, as her wish was to make friends, she has permanently lost the ability to make any friends, along with her memories of being a Selector. As Yuzuki feels angered towards Hanayo for keeping this a secret from her, Ruko is approached by Akira, who explains how she witnessed what happened to a losing Selector after she was defeated by Iona. Angered by Akira's insults towards Hitoe, Ruko agrees to battle against her.
6	"This Pure Heart"; Transliteration: "Kono Mune wa Junpaku" (Japanese: この胸は純白)	May 8, 2014
Ruko proves resilient to Akira's usual tactics, due to lacking a wish, and manages to win the battle against her. As Akira runs off in disgrace, she is confronted by Iona, whose LRIG, Ulith, mocks Akira's petty wish to ruin Iona's life and the cowardly means she is going to in order to achieve it. Upon learning that she had effectively lost her job in pursuit of her revenge, Akira angrily challenges Iona to a battle. The next day, Yuzuki, who feels she is growing further apart from Kazuki, is approached by a Selector named Chiyori and wins a battle against her and her LRIG, Eldora. Meanwhile, Ruko is called to meet with Hitoe's mother, who is seeking answers behind Hitoe's sudden behavior, which just leaves Ruko more conflicted over what she should do, leading her to run off.
7	"That Girl's Desire"; Transliteration: "Sono Shōjo wa Setsubō" (Japanese: その少女は切望)	May 15, 2014
Feeling more and more guilty about Hitoe's situation, Ruko becomes determined to put a stop to the battles and searches for Yuzuki. Her search takes her to the photo studio, where she ends up running into Iona and Ulith, who reveal that Akira had lost her third battle against them, also revealing that they were the ones who dealt Hitoe her third loss. As Ulith suggests that Ruko has actually found her wish, Iona explains that she has a thirst for battle, suggesting Ruko is the same way, and manages to lure her into a battle. Despite being reluctant at first, Ruko finds herself drawn heavily into the battle and the two fight to their heart's content, However just as Tama and Ruko are about to deal the final blow, the match is ended abruptly by one of Iona's managers without a clear winner. Afterwards, as Ruko regrets enjoying the battle so much, she and Yuzuki are called to an abandoned building by Akira, who reveals a disturbing scar on her face.
8	"That Fake Vow"; Transliteration: "Ano Chigiri wa Soragoto" (Japanese: あの契は虚事)	May 22, 2014
Blaming them for the scar on her face, which has ruined her life as per her curse, Akira attempts to attack Ruko and Yuzuki with a knife, but is chased off by a security guard, giving the two a chance to escape. Yuzuki tells Ruko that she should quit being a Selector but refuses to quit herself, saying they should stop being friends. As Ruko spends the rest of the night in tears, Yuzuki finds another Selector to battle against the next day. Meanwhile, as Kanzaki turns down a girl confessing to him, he learns of the harsh things people have been saying about him and Yuzuki. Upon winning her battle, Yuzuki earns the right to become an Eternal Girl and have her wish granted, entering a ritual alongside Hanayo. When Kazuki returns home that night, Yuzuki begins seducing him. Meanwhile, after her mother buys her a new WIXOSS deck, Hitoe discovers a red LRIG that looks exactly like Yuzuki.
9	"The Cruel Truth"; Transliteration: "Sono Shinjitsu wa Mujō" (Japanese: その真実は無情)	May 29, 2014
As rumors about Yuzuki and Kazuki spreads around school, Yuzuki straight up tells Kazuki that she has always loved him, revealing her wish was to become his girlfriend. Unable to take all of this in, Kazuki runs away from school. Meanwhile, Ruko is approached by Hitoe, who has once again become a Selector, and discovers that the real Yuzuki has become her LRIG. As Ruko reluctantly agrees to battle against Hitoe, Yuzuki explains the cruel truth behind the Selector battles. When a Selector becomes an Eternal Girl, their LRIG takes over their body and receives their wish instead, whilst the Selector themselves becomes an LRIG. As such, Yuzuki ended up as an LRIG whilst Hanayo took over her body, receiving Kazuki's feelings as he confesses back to her.
10	"That Stranded Emotion"; Transliteration: "Ano Omoi wa Hyōchaku" (Japanese: あの思いは漂着)	June 5, 2014
Upon hearing Yuzuki's explanation, Hitoe feels a rush of memories and collapses under the strain, causing the battle to end. After Hitoe is rushed to hospital, Yuzuki recalls what happened after she became an LRIG, waking up in a white room where she learned the truth about everything from a woman named Mayu, who also told her that LRIGs who tell their chosen Selectors in order to keep them from battling will remain trapped in their cards forever. Yuzuki had initially planned to deceive Hitoe in order to have a chance at escaping, but upon seeing Hitoe still desire friends despite the pain her curse inflicts upon her, Yuzuki made the decision to tell the truth in front of her during her battle against Ruko, as she didn't want to sacrifice Hitoe's happiness for her own freedom. After Hitoe's mother arrives, Ruko and Yuzuki follow Hanayo as she goes out with Kazuki, seeing the effects of Yuzuki's wish in motion. Later that night, Tama laments that she knows nothing about her past life or anything concerning the Selector battles. The next day at school, Ruko learns of an event Iona is holding to lure out Selectors.
11	"The Summer of Dreams"; Transliteration: "Ano Natsu wa Shōkei" (Japanese: あの夏は憧憬)	June 12, 2014
Upon scouting out the location of Iona's event, Ruko states that her wish is to free Yuzuki, Tama, and all the LRIGs and return them to their normal lives. Whilst Yuzuki states it would be not be able to be granted, Tama feels she may know a way to return LRIGs to normal, with Yuzuki remembering Mayu stating that some LRIGs may possess special powers. As Yuzuki warns Ruko that going through with such a wish would mean never being able to see her family again, Hitoe appears and retrieves Yuzuki, stating that she will participate in Iona's event. Upon arriving home, Ruko overhears her grandmother, Hatsu, speaking on the phone with her mother, before asking about her wish. On the day of the event, Tama voices her objection to Ruko going to battle, as she is uncertain on whether her wish will be properly granted. Arriving at the event, Ruko, Hitoe, and the other Selectors are greeted by Iona, who announces the event will take the form of a tournament, with the winner getting the chance to battle against Iona. As Ruko fights her way through the tournament, she soon comes up against Hitoe. Upon hearing how Ruko wants to battle for fun like they used to, Yuzuki tries to get Hitoe to recall her memories.
12	"That Choice..."; Transliteration: "Sono Sentaku wa..." (Japanese: その選択は)	June 19, 2014
Hitoe reveals she had managed to regain her memories of her friends, having kept quiet about them as she wanted to win in order to free Yuzuki, even if it meant losing her body. Resolving her wish to free all the girls who were sealed into LRIGs, Ruko wins her battle and moves on to the rooftop to face off against Iona, with Hitoe and Yuzuki joining her to spectate. As the battle begins, Tama hears a voice calling her and soon comes across Mayu, who tries to turn her against Ruko, saying she will only know the truth if she wins her battle. With the battle nearing its climax, Tama realizes from Ruko's look that she intends to become an LRIG for the sake of her friends and becomes defiant, resulting in their ritual failing. As Ruko falls into distress about not having her wish granted, Iona and Ulith use the opportunity to undergo their own ritual, which Iona had been waiting for the right moment to undergo. Following the blast of the ritual, Ulith takes over Iona's body whilst Ruko is shocked to discover Tama has disappeared from her card, with Iona appearing in her place.

==== Season 2: spread WIXOSS ====
No.	Title	Original release date
1	"This Silent Beginning"; Transliteration: "Kono Hiraki wa Muon" (Japanese: この開は無音)	October 4, 2014
Following the incident, Ruko has been trying to have fun spend time with Hitoe and Yuzuki, but is still troubled by her memories of Tama. Stumbling across a WIXOSS tournament in a market, they are approached by Chiyori, who challenges them to a battle. They refuse and try to explain the true nature of WIXOSS to Chiyori, showing her what happened to Yuzuki, but Chiyori remains deluded by her fantasies. Meanwhile, Ruko continues to be troubled by Iona, whose wish was to become her LRIG, realising that, despite refusing to battle, she can't bring herself to throw her away.
2	"That Feverish Bond"; Transliteration: "Sono Kizuna wa Binetsu" (Japanese: その絆は微熱)	October 11, 2014
It is revealed that Akira, who had become a recluse ever since receiving her scar, was approached by Ulith, now possessing Iona's body, who stated her admiration for her. Using Iona's position, Ulith helps Akira get her career back on track, though eventually asks for something in exchange. Later, as Hitoe and Yuzuki learn that Akira is seeking out Selectors, Akira appears before Ruko and Iona, challenging them to a battle with her new LRIG, Milulun. With Ruko becoming overwhelmed by Akira, narrowly avoiding defeat when their match is interrupted by a security guard, she laments that she isn't able to have fun in battles without Tama and her friends with her. Meanwhile, Chiyori is approached by Ulith.
3	"That Accidental Reunion"; Transliteration: "Sono Saikai wa Tamatama" (Japanese: その再会は偶々)	October 18, 2014
Ruko briefly runs into Hanayo, who tells her to keep on battling, while Iona continues to try swaying her into taking advantage of her for the sake of battling. Feeling that she only enjoyed battles when she was with Tama, Ruko tries Iona for information on Tama's whereabouts, only learning Mayu's name. Meanwhile, in another world, Tama desires to see Ruko again despite warnings from Mayu, who she seems to remember from somewhere. Later, Ruko learns from Yuzuki and Hitoe that Akira is spreading rumors about WIXOSS to bring out more Selectors, eventually confessing that she had fought against her. After scolding Ruko for acting on her own, Yuzuki and Hitoe state that they wouldn't be happy if she was to disappear, even if it were for their sake, and agree to help her with her search for Tama. Later, Ruko and the others come across Chiyori being challenged by Ulith, who now wields Tama as her LRIG.
4	"Those Wild Delusions"; Transliteration: "Sono Mōsō wa Bakusō" (Japanese: その妄想は爆走)	October 25, 2014
As Tama reluctantly follows Ulith's commands to fight against Chiyori, Ruko senses that Tama isn't having fun with battling and apologises for not sharing her true feelings with her before. After defeating Chiyori, Ulith tells Ruko to battle her if she wants Tama back, though Tama urges her not to do so. Later, the girls hear Chiyori mention a White Garden, which Yuzuki remembers as the room she ended up in upon becoming a LRIG, and ask to borrow her WIXOSS novel, which seems to be closely tied to the secret of the LRIGs. Determined to find the truth, the girls try to get in contact with the book's author, Futase Fumio, who they believe may be a Selector with knowledge about Mayu. Later, as Ulith prepares to make further use of Akira, Ruko and the others are called by Futase to meet up with her.
5	"This Impatience an Awakening"; Transliteration: "Kono Iradachi wa Kakusei" (Japanese: この苛立は覚醒)	November 1, 2014
Futase explains she is fully aware of WIXOSS' secrets, but still desires to battle, agreeing to tell what she knows if someone beats her in a battle. With Chiyori already having two losses, Ruko steps in to battle against Futase and her LRIG, An. With Ruko struggling to bring out her full potential, Iona tells her that she needs to get serious if she has any hope of saving Tama. With this new determination, Ruko manages to grow Iona into a previously impossible Level 5 LRIG and win the battle. Futase then reveals that she herself was a LRIG whose Selector was the real Fumio, who initially wanted to achieve her wish by her own esteem. She eventually gave into battles and soon became an Eternal Girl while Futase took Fumio's place, during which she overheard Mayu mention about a "Girl of Black" and a "Girl of White", which Fumio believes that "Girl of Black" was referring to Iona.
6	"That Existence is Dark Black"; Transliteration: "Sono Sonzai wa Shikkoku" (Japanese: その存在は漆黒)	November 8, 2014
Futase further reveals she feels burdened by Fumio's wish, as she needs to keep writing consistently to keep it fulfilled, becoming a Selector so that she could once again meet Mayu and find more material to write about. As Ruko becomes more determined to free all LRIGs so that they won't have to suffer as Eternal Girls, she discovers Iona has suddenly come down with a fever and tries to do what she can to help her. Later that night, after Hitoe leaves Yuzuki with Ruko that night, she is confronted by Akira who, upon finding that she is unable to battle without Yuzuki with her, takes her hostage in order to lure Ruko and Iona out. When Ruko arrives to confront Akira, she discovers her true opponent is actually Ulith.
7	"That Lie is a Scar"; Transliteration: "Ano Uso wa Kizuato" (Japanese: あの嘘は傷跡)	November 15, 2014
Ulith punishes Akira for her unsightly tactics, expressing her joy of breaking things and people and stating her wish is to have everyone continuously suffer in the LRIG cycle. Fearing for Hitoe's safety, Ruko agrees to battle against Ulith in order to rescue her. As Ruko and Tama battle against each other seriously, Tama urges Ruko to defeat her quickly using Iona's Level 5 form, with Tama barely withstanding Iona's attack. It is then that Iona recalls that Mayu is actually the mother who gave birth to both Iona, the Girl of Darkness, and Tama, the Girl of Light, at which point Mayu deals her own punishment to Iona.
8	"This World is My Property"; Transliteration: "Kono Sekai wa Shibutsu" (Japanese: この世界は私物)	November 22, 2014
Iona explains that Mayu was once a girl who grew up in a secluded room, unaware of the world outside until reading a book about friends. Finding a WIXOSS deck and needing someone to play with, Mayu created Tama and Iona, originally named Shiro and Kuro, as imaginary friends who would play the game together, eventually coming up with the sadistic rules of the Selector battles that would soon become reality. Iona further explains Mayu's wish is to have revenge on those who live in the outside world, while her own fate was to repeat the cycle between Selector and LRIG, which was changed after meeting Ruko. Tama also says how she at first forgot Mayu, but now remembers. As Iona and Tama seek to become friends with Mayu and free all the LRIGs, Ulith infects Tama with her darkness, growing her into a dark Level 5 and forcing her to beat Iona with her own hands and win the match. Akira, driven insane by Ulith's betrayal, stabs her with a fountain pen, leaving her bleeding as she seeks her next target.
9	"That Abrupt Separation"; Transliteration: "Sono Wakare wa Tōtotsu" (Japanese: その 別れは唐突)	November 29, 2014
As Akira seeks out more battles in order to heal the scar she inflicted upon Ulith, Yuzuki theorises Mayu's true wish in creating the Selector battles was not necessarily revenge, but to show others how lonely she was. Later, when Chiyori comes around asking for a battle, Hitoe agrees to battle against her, feeling that she may be better off if her wish to be part of the WIXOSS world is reversed. During the battle, Eldora reveals she was thinking the same thing and had been planning to lose in order to spare Chiyori from the pain of battles. Despite Chiyori's objections, she is unable to draw the cards needed to turn things around. Meanwhile, Ulith, who had been treated for her injuries, is confronted by Akira.
10	"This Warmth Is at Its Limit"; Transliteration: "Kono Mekumori wa Genkai" (Japanese: このめくもりは限界)	December 6, 2014
Following her battle, Chiyori loses her memories surrounding WIXOSS while Eldora, certain she'll be able to become friends with Ruko and Hitoe some day, takes her leave. Meanwhile, Akira states her desire to repeat a cycle of LRIG and human in order to keep scarring and healing Ulith and battles against her, but is again beaten by Dark Tama. After receiving some anonymous directions from Hanayo, Ruko and the others find Iona's body, finding it to be inhabited by the original Iona Urazoe. The real Iona explains how she became a LRIG as a result of a wish not to be herself anymore, her desire to remain as she was coming as a surprise to Mayu. After Iona explains how she returned to her body when she felt it become hollow, the others come to the conclusion that Ulith made her wish come true, albeit with Tama refusing to take over Iona's body, as she didn't want to become human at the expense of others. After seeing the original Iona off, Ruko states her plan to become an LRIG so that she can find Mayu and Tama, giving Iona the new name of Yuki. As Mayu locks Tama away, Ruko and the others decide to confront Hanayo.
11	"That Locked Window"; Transliteration: "Ano Mado wa Sejō" (Japanese: あの窓は施錠)	December 13, 2014
Hanayo explains that even though she herself has fallen in love with Kazuki, she doesn't want to betray Yuzuki. Kazuki overhears this and learns the truth, leading Hanayo to try and run off, only to suddenly collapse in the process and become hospitalized. As Yuzuki worries that Hanayo will disappear if she can't fulfil her wish, Yuki believes she can and Ruko might be able to reach Tama during a battle against Hitoe and Yuzuki. Sure enough, Yuki manages to get in contact with Tama, encouraging her to grant Ruko's wish alongside her. Together, they make Ruko an Eternal Girl, showing Hitoe and Yuzuki a glimpse of the white windowed room, where Kazuki theorises they may find the real-life Mayu. Ruko and Yuki arrive at the white windowed room to try and talk things out with Mayu, but Ulith also appears, declaring Mayu as her Selector and challenging them to a battle. As the two pairs battle, Yuki starts disappearing as a result of Iona returning to her original body, so Ruko takes her and goes off in search for Tama. Both Ruko and Hitoe's group then learn that the real Mayu is already dead, before Mayu attacks Yuki with a Level 5 attack.
12	"This Selection..."; Transliteration: "Kono Sentaku wa..." (Japanese: この選択は...)	December 20, 2014
Tama manages to escape her imprisonment and rejoins with Ruko, who combines Tama and Yuki into one LRIG, who is also named Mayu after her true feelings, resuming their match against Mayu and Ulith. Meanwhile, Hitoe and Kazuki enter Mayu's room in the real world, commenting on what a lonely place it is. Mayu laments how she was never given the opportunity to 'select' before she died. Returning to Mayu's not-quite-real room, Mayu gives Ruko one opportunity to guess what color card she chose in order to win the game. Ruko correctly guesses that the card Mayu chose was non-colored, resulting in Ulith being destroyed. Afterwards, Ruko embraces Mayu, allowing her to pass on into the open world. Ruko then changes her wish slightly so that all LRIGS, including those who were LRIGs to begin with, would become girls, completing her contract with the new Mayu. With the Selector battles over, with all girls returned to their original forms, Ruko awaits the day when she can finally meet Tama as a human. It ends with Tama, shown to be a human now, sitting on a rooftop.

=== Lostorage series (2016–18) ===
==== Season 1: incited WIXOSS ====
No.	Title (Note: All English episode titles are taken from Crunchyroll.)	Original release date
1	"Memories / Front and Back"; Transliteration: "Kioku / Ura to Hyō" (Japanese: 記憶 / 裏と表)	October 7, 2016
Suzuko Homura returns to her hometown for the first time since elementary school, recalling her friend Chinatsu Morikawa who she hasn't been able to contact. As Suzuko struggles to make friends at her new school, she decides to learn the WIXOSS card game that is popular with her classmates. Just then, Suzuko's LRIG, who she names Riru, speaks to her, revealing that she will take part in Selector battles against other chosen players. Converting her memories into coins, four black and one gold, Riru reveals that she will stake them in Selector battles, stating that she will be to regain who she is if she turns all her coins, but will disappear completely if they all turn black. Despite trying to avoid battling, Suzuko learns that if she does nothing, her single gold coin will turn black and she will lose all of her memories. Not wanting to lose her memories of Chinatsu, Suzuko accepts a battle against a male Selector named Takeshi Sumida, who has already obtained four gold coins. As Suzuko struggles against her opponent, Riru encourages her to bet her coin, causing Takeshi to inadvertently blurt out his strategy and lose the battle. At the same time, Chinatsu is also greeted by her own LRIG.
2	"Girl / Ideal and Reality"; Transliteration: "Shōjo / Risō to Genjitsu" (Japanese: 少女 / 理想と現実)	October 14, 2016
After meeting her own LRIG, named Meru, Chinatsu soon comes up against a Selector but loses against her after refusing to use her coins to control other people's minds. Meanwhile, Suzuko is approached by another Selector, a game reviewer named Hanna Mikage, who reveals that the reward for winning Selector battles is the ability to manipulate their own memories. While facing slipping grades as a result of studying up on WIXOSS, Chinatsu ends up losing against another Selector battle, leaving her with just one gold coin left. Pushed further into despair as she is fired from her job after fighting with her classmates, Chinatsu, who starts to lose her memories of Suzuko, faces off against a young Selector named Rio. Not wanting to lose any more, Chinatsu bets her coin in order to win against Rio, wondering whether she actually needs Suzuko.
3	"Selector / Honey and Poison"; Transliteration: "Serekutā / Mitsu to Doku" (Japanese: セレクター / 蜜と毒)	October 21, 2016
Suzuko briefly comes across another Selector named Shouhei Shirai, who chooses to avoid battles. Following his LRIG Donor's advice, Suzuko goes to a card shop and goes up against a Selector named Masaru Narumi and his LRIG Aya. After her Holograph ability is thwarted by Ruri's Honest ability, Aya uses another ability to deal heavy damage to Ruri, but Suzuko manages to win with an all-out attack. After the battle, Masaru reveals how his younger sister, also named Aya, ended up losing all of her coins in Selector battles, revealing that "disappearing" also means losing your personality along with your memories. Meanwhile, Hanna witnesses this for herself as she defeats another Selector, who loses all of her coins and "disappears" in the same way, resulting in her personality being replaced by that of her LRIG's.
4	"Reunion / Bright Light and Chaos"; Transliteration: "Saikai / Kōmyō to Konton" (Japanese: 再会 / 光明と混沌)	October 28, 2016
Approached by Suzuko about what happens to Selectors who lose, Hanna brings her to her house, where she explains how someone known as the "bookmaker" is allegedly arranging battles between Selectors. After chasing up various leads, Suzuko and Hanna eventually meet the bookmaker in question, Kou Satomi, who explains his motives for arranging battles despite not being a Selector himself. When Takeshi comes in demanding another battle, Kou sets him up in a battle against Chinatsu, much to Suzuko's surprise. Wanting to see Chinatsu, Suzuko agrees to enter Kou's booking before she and Hanna head to the arranged spot where Chinatsu begins her battle against Takeshi. Brought into the battle as a spectator, Suzuko is shocked to see Chinatsu act so coldly as she eliminates her opponent, resulting in Takeshi becoming replaced by his LRIG.
5	"Friend / Bonds and Chains"; Transliteration: "Tomodachi / Kizuna to Kusari" (Japanese: 友達 / 絆と鎖)	November 4, 2016
Chinatsu coldly states that she wants to win Selector battles in order to remove the memories she shared with Suzuko, feeling that they only burdened her to try to be the girl she admired. The next day, Chinatsu comes across Shouhei, who refuses to battle against her after witnessing how much his previous opponent was hurt after he defeated her. Meanwhile, Suzuko is booked in a battle against Hanna, who manages to overcome Suzuko's Honest ability and win against her, earning her fourth coin. As Riru encourages Suzuko to use her own strength to prove how she feels, Chinatsu, determined to get into her college of choice, takes on a new job.
6	"Battle / Past and Present"; Transliteration: "Batoru / Kako to Genzai" (Japanese: バトル / 過去と現在)	November 11, 2016
Chinatsu begins working for Kou, helping him to get more contracts with Selectors by overwhelming them in battle. During her job, Chinatsu comes across Rio, who believes she can bring back her mother by erasing the memory of her death, and recruits her as well. Curious to see if Chinatsu really has the cut her ties with Suzuko, Kou arranges for the two to battle each other. As Suzuko remains unwilling to attack despite only having a single coin left, Chinatsu reveals all the hardships she faced because of her father's bankruptcy before using her Berserk ability on her. Determined to keep Riru safe, Suzuko attacks the field itself in order to avoid Chinatsu's attacks before the battle is cancelled due to a third party interfering. After Riru reminds her of how she came to become friends with Chinatsu in the first place, Suzuko becomes determined not to run away anymore.
7	"Evolution / Pure White and Pitch Black"; Transliteration: "Shinka / Junpaku to Shikkoku" (Japanese: 進化 / 純白と漆黒)	November 18, 2016
Wanting to become stronger so she can protect both her and Chinatsu's memories, Suzuko asks Hanna to give her WIXOSS lessons. The next day, they are approached by Shouhei, who tells Suzuko about what Chinatsu was like during middle school before asking Hanna to partner with him so they can get through the ninety day time limit with minimal battling. Hanna refuses, however, telling Shohei that he cannot control what memories he will lose. Later, after Rio manages to win against Masaru, Chinatsu is sent to battle against Shouhei, beating him in order to have him sign a contract with Kou.
8	"Darkness / Fervent Desire and Loss"; Transliteration: "Yami / Katsubō to Shōshitsu" (Japanese: 闇 / 渇望と喪失)	November 25, 2016
After hearing from Suzuko about how she lost her mother, Hanna explains that she wants to regain the memories of how her younger brother, Yuuto, died. Meanwhile, Chinatsu hesitates giving Shouhei's contract to Kou after he questions why she is working for him. The next day, Kou has someone spy on Chinatsu as Suzuko states her determine to become stronger so she won't have to rely on her. Meanwhile, Hanna confronts a Selector named Kiyoi Mizushima, who uses her Piruluk's ability to read her wish while warning her to stop investigating Selector battles. Elsewhere, Narumi is challenged by Kou, who reveals himself to be a former LRIG and the Selector who defeated his sister. Defeating Narumi, whose personality is replaced with the LRIG Aya, Kou suggests that they join forces.
9	"Truth / Ending and Beginning"; Transliteration: "Shinjitsu / Owari to Hajimari" (Japanese: 真実 / 終わりと始まり)	December 2, 2016
Following her encounter with Kiyoi, Hanna looks into rumors concerning WIXOSS, coming across the name Mayu. As Hanna explains what she has learned to Suzuko, Kiyoi reveals to Chinatsu that she was once one of the Eternal Girls created by Mayu's Selector battles, becoming the LRIG Piruluk. After the previous games ended, the feelings of the girls who lost their dreams took on a will of their own, resulting in the current Selector battles. The next day, one of the LRIGs who took over her Selector's body appears before Chinatsu, stating that she has grown tired of the neverending cycle of pain she faces before committing suicide in front of her. Meanwhile, as Hanna manages to win her fifth coin and regains her desired memory, she is horrified to learn that it was allegedly her own fault that Yuuto died.
10	"Devouring Prey / Tragedy and Comedy"; Transliteration: "Hoshoku / Higeki to Kigeki" (Japanese: 捕食/悲劇と喜劇)	December 9, 2016
Shouhei brings Chinatsu to his old school to reminisce, unaware that they are being filmed by Kou's underlings. Kou uses this video to blackmail Shouhei into battling against him, bragging about how he treats Chinatsu and defeating him. Meanwhile, as Hanna has been shutting herself away following her recent revelation, she is comforted by her older sister, who had heard about her struggles from Suzuko. Later, as Kou informs Chinatsu of a battle between Shouhei and Rio, who both have only one coin left, he is confronted by Kiyoi, determined to stop him. As Kiyoi uses her Peeping ability on Kou only to find pure darkness in his heart, Kou manages to get under her skin and win. Unable to bring himself to beat Rio, Shouhei ends up losing by the time Chinatsu arrives, becoming replaced by Donor.
11	"The Two / Suzuko and Chinatsu"; Transliteration: "Futari / Suzuko to Chinatsu" (Japanese: 二人/すず子と千夏)	December 16, 2016
After speaking with Hanna, who finally stops shutting herself in and learns to move forward, Suzuko is approached by Donor, who asks her to fulfil Shouhei's wish of bringing Chinatsu back to her normal self. The next day, Chinatsu, shook up over Shouhei's defeat, calls out Suzuko to battle against her, determined to either protect or destroy their memories together. As Chinatsu uses her Berserk ability on Suzuki, she comes to realise that her true wish was to always be with her. Undoing the Berserk ability, Chinatsu allows Suzuko to defeat her, apologising and stating that she always wanted to be her true friend. Just then, Kou appears and challenges Suzuko to a battle.
12	"Dawn"; Transliteration: "Yowake" (Japanese: 夜明け)	December 23, 2016
As their battle begins, Kou uses his Carnival's Joker ability to not only change his own cards, but also use other LRIG abilities. Kou explains how his lust for battle whilst he was an LRIG led to him becoming the Bookmaker and setting Selectors against each other. Kou attempts to sway Riru over to his side, but her trust in Suzuko remains absolute. With both players low on coins and life, Chinatsu gives Suzuko one of her own coins, allowing her to win the match. As Kou disappears, resulting in his body being possessed by Carnival, Suzuko bids farewell to Riru, using her wish so that she will never forget about her. After rekindling her friendship with Suzuko, Chinatsu's coins eventually run out and she loses her memories, allowing her to restart her friendship with Suzuko.

==== Season 2: conflated WIXOSS ====
No.	Title	Original release date
1	"Omen / Daybreak and Dawn"; Transliteration: "Yochō / Yoake to Mimei" (Japanese: 予兆 / 夜明けと未明)	December 14, 2017 (OVA); April 6, 2018 (TV)
Kiyoi approaches Suzuko and warns her that their battles are far from over, revealing she is searching for Selectors to help her put a stop to the darkness once and for all. As Kiyoi, joined by Suzuko and Hanna, searches for Carnival, who now resides in Kou's body, she recalls an encounter with a LRIG who drew out the darkness residing inside of her Selector's heart. After meeting up with Donor, who urges them to stay away from Selector battles, the girls seemingly spot Carnival but lose track of her. As Suzuko decides to follow Donor's advice and stay away from the battles, Kiyoi decides to approach another former Selector; Ruko.
2	"Reason / Hesitation and Resolution"; Transliteration: "Riyū / Mayoi to Kakugo" (Japanese: 理由 / 迷いと覚悟)	April 13, 2018
After failing to convince Ruko to help her, Kiyoi meets up with her friend Amika Hashimoto, recalling how she had become her Selector back when she was Piruluk. After facing several battles together, Amika and Kiyoi soon came up against Remember, the LRIG who deceived Kiyoi, took over her original body, and killed her friend Ayumi Sakaguchi. Having felt the most for Amika than any other Selector, Kiyoi threw away her chances of becoming human again in order to ensure the safety of Amika's mother by changing her wish into one that would be reversed by her loss. As punishment from Mayu, Kiyoi was returned to her original body and reunited with Amika, but lost her memories in exchange. Some time later, Carnival had an encounter with a being known as Eternal and gained control of the Selector battles, leading to new and past Selectors being born and Kiyoi being partnered with a new Piruluk formed from her lost memories. Back in the present, Carnival is approached by a girl calling herself Layla.
3	"Initiation / Usual and Unusual"; Transliteration: "Shidō / Nichijō to Hinichijō" (Japanese: 始動 / 日常と非日常)	April 20, 2018
Several former Selectors, including Hanna and Hitoe, become reunited with their old partners for the new Selector battle, which introduces key cards as a new element. While keeping quiet about her being a Selector to Suzuko, Hanna questions Yuzuki, who has herself learned of Hitoe's situation and is keeping it quiet from Ruko. Meanwhile, Kiyoi is approached by Akira, who blames her for the way she ended up and challenges her to a battle. As Akira gets the upper hand with her random Happening skill, Kiyoi uses her key card, which allows her to join the battlefield in LRIG form and defeat Akira, winning her LRIG as a result. As Kiyoi is then confronted by Carnival, Suzuko discovers she has once again been chosen to wield Riru.
4	"Crowding / Loser and Winner"; Transliteration: "Ranritsu / Haisha to Shōsha" (Japanese: 乱立 / 敗者と勝者)	April 27, 2018
Believing the prize of altering memories might allow her to restore Chinatsu's lost memories, Suzuko agrees to take part in the battles again. Meanwhile, as more Selectors, including Yuzuki, are chosen, Hitoe is challenged by Layla, who uses her key card to become her own LRIG. Despite her best efforts, Hitoe is defeated and loses Midoriko. Elsewhere, Hanna battles against Carnival, who is seeking revenge against Suzuko, losing Anonymous after Carnival uses her key card to summon a second LRIG.
5	"Gathering / Vortex and Turbid Water"; Transliteration: "Shūketsu / Uzu to Dakuryū" (Japanese: 集結 / 渦と濁流)	May 4, 2018
Suzuko, Kiyoi, and Hanna discuss the situation, concluding that all the newly chosen Selectors are veterans from the previous battles. Meanwhile, Tama, who is now a human, becomes concerned when she starts hearing a strange voice, while Chinatsu ends up being chosen as a Selector as well, becoming determined to regain her memories despite Suzuko's warning. As Selectors gather across town, Yuzuki is challenged by Layla and defeated, becoming captured in her LRIG form alongside Hanayo. Meanwhile, as Kiyoi stops Chinatsu from facing off against Carnival and prepares to battle her instead, Donor becomes an LRIG again to assist her.
6	"Determination / Warmth and Pain"; Transliteration: "Ketsui / Nukumori to Itami" (Japanese: 決意 / 温もりと痛み)	May 11, 2018
As the battle gets underway, Kiyoi ends up replacing Donor on the field due to an apparent two LRIG limit, while Carnival is able to summon herself in addition to her two other LRIGs. Just before Carnival can finish Kiyoi off, the battle suddenly comes to a forced end when she is summoned away by a mysterious voice, who instructs her to find a "keyhole". Noticing neither Suzuko or Chinatsu wants the other to fight, Hanna proposes that they battle each other to determine who should be the one to fight. After a mutually enjoyable battle, Suzuko wins and gains control of Meru, while Chinatsu decides to continue to support her. Meanwhile, as Ruko learns from Hitoe about Yuzuki's capture, Tama decides to once again become an LRIG and fight by Ruko's side.
7	"Attachment / Trick and Trap"; Transliteration: "Shūchaku / Kakehiki to Wana" (Japanese: 執着 / 駆け引きと罠)	May 18, 2018
Remember, who had been driven crazy after parting ways with Kiyoi, is summoned by the mysterious voice and manages to become Akira's new LRIG so they can both get revenge on Kiyoi. Meanwhile, Ruko faces off against Layla, with Tama and Yuzuki as their respective LRIGs, and manages to recover Yuzuki. Hearing about Kiyoi's weakness from Remember, Akira kidnaps Amika in order to lure her out.
8	"Bond / Crime and Punishment"; Transliteration: "Kizuna / Tsumi to Batsu" (Japanese: 絆 / 罪と罰)	May 25, 2018
Keeping Amika's location a secret, Akira forces Kiyoi to battle as an LRIG and take Remember's attacks without fighting back. However, Amika manages to free herself and assure Kiyoi that she is okay, at which point Remember informs Akira that she will cease to exist if she loses all five coins. Determined to end the battles at all costs despite her hesitation, Kiyoi uses the LRIG she retrieved from Akira to defeat her, leading to her complete disappearance from existence. As Kiyoi discovers that winning five coins is not the victory condition for the current battles, Carnival kidnaps Tama from inside her card.
9	"Contact / Key and Keyhole"; Transliteration: "Sesshoku / Kagi to Kagiana" (Japanese: 接触 / 鍵と鍵穴)	June 1, 2018
Carnival brings Tama to Mayu's room, using her as the keyhole for a mysterious door. She then tells Suzuko that a being known as Eternal is the master of this new Selector game, informing her that she'll have to defeat the other Selectors in order to regain Chinatsu's memories. Carnival then appears before Ruko, claiming that Suzuko stole Tama in order to turn her against her. Meanwhile, Chinatsu comes across Rui, who starts to trigger her old memories, while Hanna exchanges information with Hitoe, taking her to meet Kiyoi. As the three learn that Carnival has set Ruko against Suzuko and try to find a way to stop them, Kiyoi is briefly called by Eternal and told to search for a key. As Ruko catches up to Suzuko and challenges her to a battle, Layla, annoyed that someone else is facing Ruko, decides to challenge Carnival.
10	"The Eve / Trust and Betrayal"; Transliteration: "Zenya / Shinrai to Uragiri" (Japanese: 前夜 / 信頼と裏切り)	June 8, 2018
Just as the battle between Ruko and Suzuko grows intense as each player brings out their full strength, Hanna manages to force it to end by spreading rumors about a fake photoshoot, bringing a third party to their location. Meanwhile, as Carnival loses her duel against Layla on purposes, Chinatsu becomes distraught as she slowly regains her memories. Gathering everyone together, Kiyoi explains what she learned from her encounter with Eternal, gaining their cooperation in preventing Carnival from becoming the master of Mayu's room. The next day, as Layla battles against Ruko, Yuki appears from inside Tama's body, taking her place in captivity so Tama can fight by Ruko's side. Meanwhile, Suzuko, Kiyoi, and Hanna come up against Carnival.
11	"Choice / Battle and Battle"; Transliteration: "Sentaku / Batoru to Batoru" (Japanese: 選択 / バトルとバトル)	June 15, 2018
Suzuko decides to go up against Carnival, who manages to achieve a Level 5 form and defeat her, taking both of her LRIGs. Meanwhile, Ruko manages to defeat Layla with Tama's help, recovering all the LRIGs she had taken, after which Tama hears a voice from Yuki instructing her to find the room of beginnings. Kiyoi steps up to face Carnival next, raising her level above Level 5 to send her out of control and defeat her. After regrouping, Ruko forfeits against Kiyoi to give her all the LRIGs, allowing her to travel to the White Room where Eternal shows her to a room full of coins containing everyone's memories.
12	"Light"; Transliteration: "Hikari" (Japanese: 光)	June 22, 2018
Eternal objects to Kiyoi's wish to end the battles and attempts to take over her body. However, Kiyoi manages to fend the darkness off and challenges Eternal to one final battle. As the LRIGs assist Kiyoi in fighting off the clones Eternal creates, Tama reunites with Yuki while Ruko and the others arrive at Mayu's old house to search for the true door, which she discovers to be a drawing of windows. Sensing that Eternal wanted to be saved, Kiyoi uses her Peeping Analyze to bring her peace. As the White Room disappears, everyone regains their memories and all those who had previously disappeared because of the battles are returned to normal, finally bringing the Selector battles to an end.

=== DIVA series (2021) ===
==== WIXOSS DIVA(A)LIVE ====
No.	Title	Directed by	Written by	Original release date
Special	"Christmas Special I'll Show you a Little Earlier!"; Transliteration: "Kurisumasu Supesharu Chotto Saki ni Misechauzo!" (Japanese: クリスマスSPちょっと先に見せちゃうぞ！)	Makoto Sokuza	Tsuyoshi☆Tamai	December 26, 2020
1	"Head for the Top!"; Transliteration: "Ikuyo, Teppen!" (Japanese: いくよ、てっぺん！)	Makoto Sokuza	Tsuyoshi☆Tamai	January 9, 2021
2	"There Are No Limits!"; Transliteration: "Genkai Nante Nain Dakara!" (Japanese: 限界なんてないんだから！)	Yūichirō Aoki	Tsuyoshi☆Tamai	January 16, 2021
3	"I Don't Wanna Lose!"; Transliteration: "Maketa Kunai Nya!" (Japanese: 負けたくないにゃ！)	Yoshiyuki Nogami	Tsuyoshi☆Tamai	January 23, 2021
4	"I'm Sorry"; Transliteration: "Gomennasai" (Japanese: ごめんなさい)	Kyōhei Suzuki	Masato Matsune	January 30, 2021
5	"I'm Not Scared Anymore"; Transliteration: "Mō, Kowaku Nai" (Japanese: もう、怖くない)	Yoshiyuki Nogami	Masato Matsune	February 6, 2021
6	"Just Disappear"; Transliteration: "Kiechaeba Ii no ni" (Japanese: 消えちゃえばいいのに)	Taiki Nishimura	Tsuyoshi☆Tamai	February 13, 2021
7	"She's My Teammate!"; Transliteration: "Nakama Damon!" (Japanese: 仲間だもん！)	Miyuki Ishida, Yoshiyuki Nogami	Tsuyoshi☆Tamai	February 20, 2021
8	"Let's Kyuru Kyurun!"; Transliteration: "Rettsu Kyuru Kyurun☆" (Japanese: Let's きゅるきゅる～ん☆)	Makoto Sokuza	Tsuyoshi☆Tamai	February 27, 2021
9	"It's Fate!"; Transliteration: "Unmei da yo!" (Japanese: 運命だよ！)	Maki Kodaira, Yoshiyuki Nogami	Tsuyoshi☆Tamai	March 6, 2021
10	"Don't Run Away!"; Transliteration: "Nigeruna!" (Japanese: 逃げるな！)	Yūichirō Aoki, Makoto Sokuza	Yasunori Yamada	March 13, 2021
11	"This Is My Limit..."; Transliteration: "Genkai da yo..." (Japanese: 限界だよ・・・)	Kyōhei Suzuki, Makoto Sokuza	Tsuyoshi☆Tamai	March 20, 2021
12	"NO LIMIT!"	Yoshiyuki Nogami, Yoshitomo Yonetani, Makoto Sokuza	Tsuyoshi☆Tamai	March 27, 2021
