= List of television stations in Malaysia =

Television broadcasting in Malaysia is provided by the federal government and respective private broadcasting companies. Analog television transmissions were completely turned off on 31 October 2019 and replaced with full MYTV Digital TV broadcast using DVB-T2 technology. The switchover was done in stages by region, which began with the Central and Southern regions on 30 September 2019, the Northern and Eastern regions on 14 October 2019, and Sabah and Sarawak on 31 October 2019. The Service Level Availability (SLA) for digital TV transmissions currently stands at 99.9%.

The first trial broadcasts of digital TV started in 2006 by a government-owned television broadcaster, Radio Televisyen Malaysia (RTM). Some local TV channels have been broadcasting shows in HD for special occasions since 2008. Free-to-air and subscription-based television channels in Malaysia are available in HD standards through terrestrial, satellite, and IP, as well as over OTT platforms.

Currently, there are only two free-to-air digital terrestrial platforms in Malaysia with high-definition channels: MYTV and NJOI.

== National free-to-air television broadcasters ==
=== Radio Televisyen Malaysia (RTM) ===
DVB name	LCN	Launch date	Broadcast hours (UTC+08:00)	Programming language(s)	Availability
TV1	101_{HD}	28 December 1963	24 hours	Malay and English	Nationwide
TV2	102_{HD}	17 November 1969	24 hours	Malay, English, Chinese (Mandarin), Indian (Hindi, Tamil and Telugu), Korean, Filipino and Turkish	Nationwide
OKEY	110_{HD}	21 March 2018	24 hours	Malay, English, Chinese (Mandarin), Indonesian, Indian (Tamil), Iban (Bumiputera Sarawak), Kadazandusun (Bumiputera Sabah) and Bajau	Nationwide
Sukan+	111_{HD}	1 April 2021	24 hours	Malay and English	Nationwide
Berita RTM	123_{HD}	25 June 2020	24 hours	Malay, English, Chinese (Mandarin), Indian (Tamil), Iban (Bumiputera Sarawak), Kadazandusun (Bumiputera Sabah) and Bajau	Nationwide

=== Over-the-top (OTT) ===
- RTMKlik

== Regional free-to-air television broadcasters ==
=== Sarawak ===
Sarawak Media Group (SMG)

DVB name	LCN	Launch date	Broadcast hours (UTC+08:00)	Programming language(s)	Availability
TVS	122_{HD}	10 October 2020	24 hours	English, Malay, Iban, Chinese (Mandarin), Filipino, Thai, and Indonesian	Nationwide

== Private owned television broadcasters ==
=== Media Prima Berhad ===
DVB name	LCN	Launch date	Broadcast hours (UTC+08:00)	Programming language(s)	Availability
TV3	103_{HD}	1 June 1984	24 hours	Malay, English, Indian (Hindi), Indonesian and Korean	Nationwide
DidikTV KPM	107	17 February 2021	24 hours	Malay	Nationwide
8TV	108	8 January 2004	24 hours	Chinese (Mandarin, Cantonese and Hokkien)	Nationwide
TV9	109	22 April 2006	24 hours	Malay	Nationwide

=== MY Hankuk TV Sdn Bhd ===
DVB name	LCN	Launch date	Broadcast hours (UTC+08:00)	Programming language(s)	Availability
Hankuk TV	104_{HD}	16 February 2026	7:00 a.m. – 1:00 p.m.; 2:00 p.m. – 6:00 p.m.; 7:00 p.m. – 12:00 a.m.	English, Korean and Malay	Nationwide

== Other free-to-air television broadcasters ==
=== AlHijrah Media Corporation ===
DVB name	LCN	Launch date	Broadcast hours (UTC+08:00)	Programming language(s)	Availability
TV AlHijrah	114_{HD}	7 December 2010	24 hours	Malay, English and Arabic	Nationwide

=== Malaysia News National Agency (Bernama) ===
DVB name	LCN	Launch date	Broadcast hours (UTC+08:00)	Programming language(s)	Availability
Bernama TV	121_{HD}	28 February 2008	24 hours	Malay, English, Chinese (Mandarin) and Indian (Tamil)	Nationwide

=== MYTV Broadcasting Sdn Bhd ===
DVB name	LCN	Launch date	Broadcast hours (UTC+08:00)	Programming language(s)	Availability
SIARA TV	200_{HD}	20 July 2026	24 hours	Malay and English	Nationwide

== Subscription-based providers ==
=== Satellite television ===
- Astro
- NJOI

=== Digital terrestrial television (DVB-T2) ===
- MYTV
- NJOI (available for several free-to-air digital television channels)

=== IPTV ===
- Unifi TV

=== Over-the-top (OTT) ===
==== Local OTTs ====
- Astro GO
- EDUWEBTV
- iflix
- MYTV ManaMana
- Selangor TV
- SIAR
- Sooka
- Tonton
- Unifi TV 2.0 app (formerly known as unifi playTV)

==== International OTTs ====
- Amazon Prime Video
- Apple TV+
- BBC Player
- beIN SPORTS CONNECT
- Bilibili
- Crunchyroll
- DAZN
- Disney+
- Eros Now
- GMA Play
- HBO Max
- iQIYI
- iWant
- Lionsgate Play
- Mango TV
- Netflix
- Pilipinas Live Plus
- Rakuten Viki
- Simply South
- SonyLIV
- SPOTV NOW
- Sun NXT
- TVB Anywhere+
- Vidio
- Vision+
- Viu
- Viva One
- VMX
- WeTV
- Youku
- YuppTV
- ZEE5

=== Other television stations ===
- Asia Media
- Vision Four

== Former / defunct television channels and networks ==
=== Former Astro channels (by timeline) ===
- 1997
  - STAR Mandarin Movies was replaced by Astro AEC on 1 September 1997.
- 1998
  - Asia Business News and the original incarnation of CNBC Asia were merged to form CNBC Asia Business News on 1 February 1998, and was rebranded to CNBC Asia on 1 July 1998.
  - MGM Gold ceased broadcast on 6 April 1998 and was replaced by Cinemax on 23 April 1998.
  - STAR Plus rebranded to STAR World on 1 May 1998.
  - NBC Asia rebranded to National Geographic Channel on 1 July 1998.
- 2002
  - TV Pendidikan/Animal Planet was split into TV Pendidikan (Channel 13) and Animal Planet (Channel 51) on 1 January 2002.
- 2006
  - TechTV ceased transmission on 1 March 2006.
  - NHK World TV was replaced by NHK World Premium on 1 May 2006.
- 2007
  - TV Pendidikan ceased transmission on 1 January 2007.
- 2008
  - Zee TV was replaced by Zee Variasi on 1 February 2008.
  - BBC World was rebranded to BBC World News on 21 April 2008.
  - Discovery Real Time was replaced by Discovery Turbo following its rebranding in October 2008.
- 2009
  - RTM1 and RTM2 rebranded to TV1 and TV2 on New Year's Day (1 January) 2009.
  - Astro News (which carries programs from DW TV, Al Jazeera English, and Australia Network) ceased broadcast on 1 March 2009, while DW TV programs are carried by BERNAMA TV.
  - Astro @Play ceased service on 1 May 2009 due to the insignificant number of subscribers.
  - Astro Kirana ceased broadcast on 18 May 2009. Replaced by Astro Citra on 1 June 2009.
  - BBC Entertainment was replaced by BIO Channel on 1 December 2009.
- 2010
  - Eastern Television Asia was replaced by CTi TV on 1 January 2010.
  - Astro Aruna ceased transmission on 1 February 2010 due to low viewership. Replaced by Bintang and Pelangi on 11 July 2011.
  - CCTV-9 rebranded to CCTV News on 26 April 2010 at 7:00pm.
  - Channel [V] was replaced by FOX on 16 June 2010.
  - TVB8 was replaced by TVB Entertainment News on 1 July 2010.
  - Hallmark Channel was rebranded to DIVA Universal on 19 September 2010.
  - Granada TV rebranded to ITV Granada on 1 November 2010.
- 2011
  - Playhouse Disney rebranded to Disney Junior on 11 July 2011.
- 2012
  - STAR Movies and STAR Movies HD rebranded to FOX Movies Premium and FOX Movies Premium HD on New Year's Day (1 January) 2012 at midnight.
  - WaTV ceased broadcast on 1 March 2012. Replaced by Celestial Movies HD and Kix HD, while programs broadcast by the channel are now carried by Astro AEC.
  - B4U was rebranded to Astro Bella on 5 March 2012.
  - Astro @15 ceased broadcast at midnight on 1 May 2012. Replaced by Astro Mustika HD on 21 May 2012, while programs broadcast by the channel were carried by other Malay channels.
  - Astro Lifestyle HD was separated into Food Network Asia HD and Life Inspired HD on 1 October 2012.
- 2013
  - ESPN, ESPNews, and ESPN HD rebranded to FOX Sports, FOX Sports News, and FOX Sports Plus HD on 28 January 2013.
  - Radio Mosaic ceased service on 9 February 2013 due to same-channel broadcast.
  - BIO Channel ceased broadcast on 14 June 2013.
  - beTV HD ceased broadcast on 26 August 2013.
  - CNBC will ceased broadcast on 7 October 2013 because it was unable to fulfill these objectives, but was relaunched in the same month.
- 2014
  - Jia Yu will ceased broadcast at midnight on 1 April 2014. A temporary channel aired for a month before being rebranded as Kah Lai Toi at 6am.
  - Diva Universal was officially rebranded to Diva on 16 June 2014.
  - Discovery Turbo was officially rebranded to DMAX on 7 July 2014.
  - Discovery Home & Health Asia officially rebranded to Eve on 1 August 2014.
  - STAR Sports and FOX Sports Plus HD rebranded to FOX Sports 2, FOX Sports 3, and FOX Sports HD, in which FOX Sports News was rebranded to FOX Sports 3 on 15 August 2014. FOX Sports News continued its broadcast on Astro GO.
  - Astro Zhi Zun HD rebranded to Astro Wah Lai Toi HD (Channel 310) on 6 October 2014.
  - The SD version of Fox ceased broadcasting on 16 November 2014. They were upgraded to Fox HD until Fox HD ceased broadcasting on 1 October 2021 and was replaced by Disney+ Hotstar.
- 2015
  - iView ceased broadcast on 12 January 2015 and replaced by the NJOI version on 20 January 2015.
  - The SD versions of Golf Channel ceased broadcast on 26 February 2015.
- 2016
  - Astro Hitz ceased broadcast on 16 May 2016 at 12:01am due to low viewership and declining popularity.
  - Channel M HD was rebranded back as tvN HD on 3 June 2016.
  - Sundance Channel HD ceased broadcast at midnight on 1 July 2016 due to low popularity. The first international movie channel to cease broadcasting on Astro.
  - Zee Variasi ceased broadcast on Astro at midnight on 1 October 2016. Replaced by Tara HD on 19 October 2016.
  - CCTV News rebranded to CGTN on New Year's Eve (31 December) 2016 at 12:00pm.
- 2017
  - ITV Choice ceased broadcasting and transmission on Astro 16 January 2017 at 12:15am due to low viewership.
  - Discovery HD World rebranded to Discovery Asia HD on 17 March 2017 at 09:00pm.
  - FOX Sports News, broadcast on Astro GO, ceased transmission on 29 April 2017.
  - FOX Movies Premium and FOX Movies Premium HD rebranded to FOX Movies and FOX Movies HD on 10 June 2017.
  - GO ASEAN ceased broadcasting and transmission on 12 June 2017 at 2:00am. GO ASEAN maintains its programs on Tonton and DimSum.
  - Kah Lai Toi ceased broadcasting and transmission on 1 October 2017 at midnight due to low viewership.
  - STAR World and STAR World HD rebranded to FOX Life and FOX Life HD on 1 October 2017 at 9:00am.
  - Life Inspired HD ceased transmission on 7 October 2017 due to the company's financial losses.
- 2018
  - ZooMoo ceased broadcasting and transmission on 1 April 2018 to mitigate further losses by the company. ZooMoo shows moved to Astro Xiao Tai Yang. They were the first Preschool channels to be ceased on Astro.
  - Astro Mustika HD rebranded to Astro Citra HD on 1 October 2018 at midnight.
  - Astro Bella ceased broadcasting and transmission at midnight on 1 October 2018 due to low viewership. Replaced by Naura HD.
  - EVE ceased broadcast on 1 November 2018.
  - Lifetime HD and FYI ceased broadcasting and transmission on 14 December 2018 due to low popularity, but relaunched on 15 September 2021.
- 2019
  - Astro Maya HD ceased broadcasting and transmission at midnight on 14 January 2019. The programs were later carried by Astro Prima, Astro Oasis, Astro Prima HD, and Astro Oasis HD channels, the latter two of which are in HD and available to all Astro customers. For NJOI customers, the HD version is optional; the HD pack must be purchased, while the SD version is available on different channel numbers.
  - The SD version of Disney XD ceased broadcasting and transmission on 1 March 2019. The HD version of this channel remained until 1 January 2021 due to a review of Disney's business in the region and was replaced by TA-DAA HD on 15 March 2021.
  - Zee Tamil HD ceased broadcasting and transmission on 1 March 2019 due to low popularity, Zee Tamil HD but relaunched on 1 June 2020.
  - Channel NewsAsia HD rebranded as CNA HD on 29 March 2019 to celebrate its 20th anniversary.
  - Astro Xi Yue HD ceased broadcasting and transmission on 1 July 2019 at midnight because the Overseas event channel would be aired on Channel 338. Replaced by iQIYI HD 17 days later on the same channel number. It is the first Chinese HD channel to cease on Astro.
  - A-List HD ceased broadcasting and transmission at midnight on 2 August 2019 due to low viewership, but its Astro OD service continued.
  - Tara HD were ceased broadcast on 1 October 2019. Replaced by Colors Hindi HD 6 hours later.
  - Diva and E! (along with their HD feeds) ceased broadcasting on 31 December 2019. They are the first historic channels to cease on Astro. Their shows were moved to Hello HD.
- 2020
  - Setanta Sports HD was rebranded to RugbyPass TV HD on 29 January 2020.
  - The SD version of Astro Wah Lai Toi ceased broadcasting on 1 April 2020 and was subsequently merged with TVB Jade HD. On 1 May 2020, Astro Wah Lai Toi HD transitioned to its VOD service.
  - TVB Classic Movies and Asian Action Channel ceased broadcasting and transmission on 5 April 2020.
  - Jaya TV, Raj TV, and Kalaignar TV ceased broadcasting and transmission on 1 June 2020. Replaced by Zee Tamil HD at 12:05am.
  - Astro Vaanavil was upgraded from SD to HD on 1 June 2020 and made available for all Astro customers. For NJOI customers, the HD version is optional; purchasing the HD pack retains the SD version, which is assigned to a different channel number.
  - The SD version of Astro First ceased broadcasting and transmission on 1 July 2020.
  - The SD version of Astro Best ceased broadcasting and transmission on 29 July 2020, while the HD version of the channel remained.
  - The SD versions of the Fox Sports channels and Eurosport ceased broadcasting on 16 November 2020, while the HD versions continued to broadcast.
  - The SD versions of the Astro SuperSport channels ceased broadcasting on 30 November 2020, while the HD versions continued to broadcast.
  - Disney Junior HD, Disney Channel HD, and Disney Channel ceased broadcast on 31 December 2020 due to the television provider's refreshed Kids Pack on 14 December 2020 and the launch of Disney+ Hotstar on 1 June 2021 and were replaced by Nick Jr. and Boomerang HD, which launched the same day. Disney XD HD also ceased broadcasting on 31 December 2020, following a review of Disney's business in this region, and was replaced by TA-DAA! HD on 15 March 2021. These are the second Kids channels and the first HD Kids channels to cease broadcasting on Astro.
- 2021
  - Comedy Central HD officially ceased broadcasting and transmission on 31 January 2021. It was replaced by BBC Lifestyle HD on 15 September 2021.
  - Almost all SD channels ceased broadcasting and transmission after most channels switched to all-HD on 1 March 2021.
  - Astro Awani launches the HD version of their channel on 29 March 2021. While the upgrade from SD to HD is available to all Astro customers, NJOI customers will continue to enjoy the channel in SD on a different channel number, and the HD version is optional and requires the purchase of the HD pack.
  - Aniplus HD on Astro Go ceased broadcasting and transmission on 1 April 2021 due to low viewership, while its VOD service remained operational until 11 April 2021. Aniplus HD was relaunches on 1 August 2026.
  - When Astro launched their new NJOI HD subscription-based package for NJOI customers on On 28 April 2021, the HD version of Astro Prima, Astro Oasis, Astro Vaanavil, Astro Xiao Tai Yang, Astro AEC, CCTV-4, Astro Awani, Hello HD, eGG Network HD and Astro Arena can only be enabled via the HD Pack while retaining the SD versions of these channels, which were reassigned to different channel numbers.
  - Astro TVIQ was officially upgraded to HD on 25 May 2021 and made available for all Astro customers.
  - Astro Box Office Movies Tayangan Hebat HD ceased broadcasting and transmission on 1 June 2021.
  - TVB News Channel HD were discontinued and terminated on 1 July 2021, barely one year after launch, due to copyright issues.
  - FOX HD, Fox Movies HD, Fox Family Movies HD, Fox Action Movies HD, Fox Life HD, Nat Geo People HD, FX HD, and the Fox Sports channels HD officially ceased broadcasting and transmission on 1 October 2021 due to the launch of Disney+ Hotstar in Malaysia. Hello HD ceased broadcasting and transmission on 1 October 2021 and was replaced by Lifetime HD and PRIMEtime HD, which launched on 15 September 2021. Discovery Science HD ceased broadcasting and transmission on the same date, following a review of the channel's performance, and was replaced by BBC Earth HD. They were the first Learning channels to be ceased on Astro. On the same date, ART Variety was replaced with ART Movies before ceasing transmission on 1 June 2022.
  - RugbyPass TV HD was officially rebranded to Premier Sports HD on 9 December 2021.
- 2022
  - Animax HD ceased broadcasting and transmission on 1 January 2022 due to low popularity, but its VOD service continued until 31 March 2022.
  - Astro TVIQ HD officially ceased broadcasting and transmission on 1 February 2022 when TA-DAA! HD launched on 15 March 2021 at 8:00am with the shows from the now-defunct channel carried by Astro Ceria HD and TA-DAA! HD.
  - BabyTV HD ceased broadcast 1 February 2022, with its shows officially moved to Disney+ Hotstar in Malaysia. In turn, the channel slot was officially replaced by Moonbug Kids HD.
  - Naura HD officially ceased broadcasting and transmission on 1 February 2022 because Naura content on its Astro GO app and VOD service remained reserved.
  - Star Chinese Channel HD was ceased broadcast on 1 February 2022 while the shows from that channel will be carried on Disney+ Hotstar in Malaysia, it has also been officially replaced by Phoenix Chinese Channel HD and Phoenix InfoNews Channel HD in Malaysia.
  - Astro Tutor TV PT3 and Astro Tutor TV SPM will merge into a single channel, Astro Tutor TV SMK HD, on channel 603, starting 1 April 2022. Astro Tutor TV PT3 ceased transmission, and Astro Tutor TV SPM rebranded as Astro Tutor TV SMK HD. On the same day, TVBS News HD, Astro AOD 353, Astro AOD 355, and Makkal TV ceased transmission, and Astro Tutor TV SK and TV Okey will be upgraded to HD on channels 601 and 146.
  - Astro Vellithirai on Astro GO ceased broadcasting and transmission on 14 April 2022 at 1:00am, with the channel upgraded to HD on the same day.
  - Oh!K HD officially ceased broadcasting and transmission on 1 June 2022 when K-Plus HD became available on Astro channel 396.
  - Kix HD was replaced by Oppa-Mania on 1 July 2022.
  - Chutti TV officially ceased broadcasting and transmission on 13 October 2022 and was replaced by Sun News, KTV HD, and Sun Life.
- 2023
  - eGG Network HD officially ceased broadcasting and transmission on 22 January 2023 while retaining its social media pages. Programs carried by that channel, as well as esports content, were transferred to Astro Arena HD and Astro Arena 2 HD.
  - National Geographic HD and Nat Geo Wild HD ceased broadcast on 31 January 2023 while the programs hosted from both channels can be streamed on Disney+ Hotstar, their channel slots were replaced by Global Trekker HD, Love Nature 4K, and Love Nature HD on 15 January 2023.
  - Boomerang HD and TA-DAA! HD ceased broadcasts on 31 January 2023. TA-DAA! HD channel slots were replaced by DreamWorks HD on the same day.
  - Go Shop GAAYA HD ceased broadcasting and transmission on 28 February 2023.
  - Astro Box Office BollyOne HD was replaced by Zee Cinema HD on 1 May 2023.
  - NJOI TV ceased transmission on 12 June 2023.
  - Astro SuperSport 5 HD was replaced by W-Sport on 15 July 2023.
  - Astro Best ceased its service on 22 August 2023 and migrated to Astro First.
  - Astro Shuang Xing HD ceased broadcasting and transmission on 28 August 2023 and Astro Quan Jia HD was rebranded to Astro QJ HD.
  - SHOWCASE Movies HD was rebranded to SHOWCASE HD, while PRIMEtime HD ceased broadcasting and transmission on 4 September 2023.
  - Astro Xiao Tai Yang HD transitioned to its VOD service on 3 September 2023. Selected programs will be broadcast on Astro AEC HD.
  - Astro Tutor TV SK HD and Astro Tutor TV SMK HD merged into Astro Tutor TV starting 4 September 2023.
  - All Go Shop HD channels ceased broadcasting and transmission on 11 October 2023 due to a decline in shopping trends.
- 2024
  - Paramount Network HD ceased broadcasting and transmission on 31 March 2024 and was replaced by HITS Now HD. As part of TVB's restructuring, Astro AOD 352 and 354 and TVB Magic HD ceased broadcasting and transmission, and the TVBAnywhere+ application was removed on the same date.
  - All Astro SuperSport HD channels rebranded to Astro Sports UHD, Astro Grandstand HD, Astro Premier League HD, Astro Premier League 2 HD, Astro Football HD, Astro Badminton HD, and Astro Sports Plus HD on 17 October 2024.
  - Astro Premier HD ceased broadcasting on 19 November 2024, with its programming moved to Astro Citra HD.
  - Astro Warna HD ceased broadcasting and transmission on 2 December 2024. Programming will be carried by Astro Prima HD.
- 2025
  - As a result of Netflix becoming the official broadcaster of WWE, WWE Network HD ceased broadcasting worldwide, including in Malaysia, on 1 January 2025.
  - DreamWorks HD ceased broadcast on 1 February 2025, barely three years after its launch, and was replaced by Blippi & Friends.
  - Animal Planet HD, DMAX HD, Food Network HD, and Warner TV HD were ceased broadcast midnight on 1 June 2025. Replaced by CGTN Documentary on 1 October 2025.
  - Eurosport HD ceased on 2 June 2025.
  - Sky News HD ceased broadcast on 1 August 2025.
  - Global Trekker HD ceased broadcast on 15 October 2025. Replaced by CGTN Documentary.
  - MTV Live HD ceased broadcasting worldwide, including Malaysia, on 31 December 2025 at 3:00pm. There second the first music channel to be ceased Astro.
  - Old Astro STB Video On Demand ceased service on 31 December 2025 due of lowership contraction of New Astro STB continue Video On Demand.
- 2026
  - SPOTV HD and SPOTV2 HD ceased broadcasting and transmission on 1 January 2026.
  - Malaysian feed of Golf Channel HD has rebranded to Astro Golf HD starting 1 January 2026.
  - Portal Astro First and Astro Self Service ceased service on 29 January 2026. They had migrated to My Astro App.
  - HBO HD, Cinemax HD, HBO Family HD, and HBO Hits HD ceased broadcasting and transmission on 1 March 2026, while the HBO Max app remains available to Astro customers as a standalone à la carte subscription. Replaced by Astro Showtime HD, Rock Action HD, and Rock X Stream HD. Additionally, starting 1 April 2026, Astro FAM Time HD will launch and be available to customers. These second first HBO channels to be ceased Astro.
  - Astro Cricket HD was Replaced by Cricbuzz TV HD on 9 March 2026.
  - BBC Lifestyle HD and CBeebies HD ceased broadcasting on 1 May 2026, together with BBC First, BBC Brit (VOD), and the BBC Player app. However, BBC News HD and BBC Earth HD still remain available.
  - ONE HD ceased broadcasting on 30 June 2026, replacing with Astro Daebak HD.
  - Astro Arena 2 HD was rebranded as Astro Stadium HD on 13 August 2026.
  - Netflix on Astro B'yond and Ulti Box are ceased services on 1 December 2026. However, Netflix still available on Astro Ultra Box.

=== Former Unifi TV channels ===
- 2011
  - The SD Versions of Universal Channel and Syfy Universal ceased broadcasting and transmission on 1 September 2011, barely 11 months after the channel launched. These channel of HD Version.
- 2012
  - DW-TV Asia+ was rebranded as DW on 6 February 2012.
  - Syfy Universal HD was rebranded as Syfy HD on 7 February 2012.
  - Fashion TV was replaced by UTV Stars HD on 1 May 2012.
  - STAR Chinese Movies 2 was rebranded as SCM Legend on 1 October 2012.
  - tvN HD rebranded as Channel M HD on 23 November 2012 and reverted to tvN HD on 3 June 2016.
- 2013
  - SS TV was replaced by Polimer Channel on 1 January 2013.
  - Nat Geo Music was replaced by Channel [V] International on 1 September 2013.
  - Warner TV was upgraded to HD on 1 September 2013.
- 2014
  - KidsCo officially ceased broadcasting and transmission on 10 February 2014.
  - Channel [V] International was upgraded to HD on 1 March 2014.
  - Nat Geo Adventure HD rebranded as Nat Geo People HD on 1 March 2014.
  - EMAS officially ceased broadcasting and transmission on 31 July 2014.
  - BBC Knowledge was upgraded to HD on 1 August 2014.
  - Hypp Sensasi VOD transitioned to Hypp Sensasi HD on 4 August 2014.
  - Australia Network was rebranded to Australia Plus on 29 September 2014.
  - TRACE Sport Stars HD was discontinued and terminated on 1 October 2014.
  - UTV Stars HD rebranded to Bindass Play on 1 October 2014.
- 2015
  - Now Mango, rebranded as Now Jelli HD on 1 February 2015.
  - All the Media Prima Radio Networks stations ceased broadcasting and transmission on 1 March 2015.
  - MNC International was rebranded to MNC Channel on 1 July 2015.
  - EC Inspirasi was rebranded to HyppInspirasi HD on 1 September 2015.
  - BBC Entertainment and FOX Football Channel HD ceased broadcasting on 1 October 2015 after barely 3 years of operation and were replaced by FOX Sports 2 HD on 26 August 2016.
  - Screen RED HD rebranded to RED by HBO HD on 1 October 2015.
  - BBC Knowledge HD rebranded to BBC Earth HD on 3 October 2015.
- 2016
  - Discovery Kids ceased broadcasting and transmission on 16 January 2016.
  - Fashion TV HD ceased broadcast on 1 May 2016.
  - Hikmah were officially rebranded to Salam HD on 5 June 2016.
  - Now Hairun rebranded to Now Chinese Drama on 14 June 2016.
  - All Astro Channels ceased broadcasting and transmission on 1 August 2016.
  - Star Chinese Movies and Star Chinese Channel were upgraded to HD on 1 September 2016.
  - The 2016 Summer Olympics ceased broadcasting and transmission on 2 September 2016. Replaced by Hypp Sports HD.
  - Dushh FM ceased broadcasting and transmission on 5 November 2016.
  - TV Direct SHOWCASE ceased broadcasting and transmission on 1 December 2016.
- 2017
  - MNC Channel was replaced by Pesona HD on 1 April 2017.
  - Bindass and Bindass Play ceased broadcasting and transmission on 1 April 2017. Replaced by Zee Cinema, Sony SAB, and Sony SET.
  - SCM Legend was upgraded to HD on 1 April 2017.
  - FOX Sports News HD ceased broadcasting on 28 April 2017, barely 8 months after the channel launched.
  - Hao Xiang Shopping TV HD, Syfy HD, Universal Channel HD, and HyppSports 4 HD ceased broadcasting and transmission on 30 June 2017. Replaced by LAKU Mall HD, Animax HD, and Sony Channel HD on 1 June 2017, and HyppSports Plus - Unifi Malaysia Super League HD on 2 February 2018.
  - MTV Live HD was replaced by MTV Asia HD on 1 August 2017. MTV Live HD was relaunched on 1 September 2022.
  - The 2017 SEA Games ceased broadcasting and transmission on 30 August 2017. Replaced by Hypp Sports HD.
  - Motorvision HD ceased broadcasting and transmission on 1 September 2017.
- 2018
  - RTL CBS Entertainment HD and RTL CBS Extreme HD was rebranded to Blue Ant Entertainment HD and Blue Ant Extreme HD on 1 January 2018.
  - HyppTV was rebranded to Unifi TV on 12 January 2018.
  - Capital TV HD was replaced by Channel W on 3 January 2018.
  - HyppSports Plus - Unifi Malaysia Super League HD ceased broadcasting and transmission on 1 April 2018. Replaced by Unifi Sports 4 HD on 28 February 2020.
  - Channel [V] International HD, Channel [V] Taiwan, and FOX Crime HD ceased broadcasting and transmission at midnight on 1 June 2018 due to low ratings. The first Chinese Channel to cease on Unifi TV. However, FOX Crime HD shows aired on FOX HD. It was replaced by CJ WOW SHOP HD and Dunia Sinema HD.
  - 1News and Australia Plus merged into a single channel, ABC Australia, on 1 July 2018.
  - HyppSports HD and HyppSports 2 HD ceased broadcasting and transmission on 31 July 2018, as ASN HD, the program supplier, ceased operations in Malaysia and Singapore, and were replaced by Sports Illustrated TV HD, which ceased broadcasting on 30 April 2019.
  - TVB8 and Stingray iConcerts HD ceased broadcasting and transmission at midnight on 1 September 2018. The second Chinese Channel to cease on Unifi TV.
  - Channel W, HyppSports 3 HD, Outdoor Channel HD, Hot FM, and One FM ceased broadcasting and transmission at midnight on 31 December 2018 due to the low popularity of Outdoor Channel HD.
- 2019
  - Now Chinese Drama ceased broadcasting and transmission on 1 March 2019 and transitioned to its VOD service.
  - Zee Tamil, Zee Cinema, and Zee TV were replaced by Colors TV, Colors Cineplex, and Colors Tamil HD on 1 April 2019. But Zee Tamil HD and Zee Cinema HD were relaunched on 1 October 2025, replacing Colors Tamil HD and Colors Cineplex.
  - Sony Channel HD and MUTV HD were discontinued and terminated on 31 May 2019 due to MUTV HD's low popularity.
  - Bloomberg Television and PlayBox HD were ceased broadcast on 31 August 2019.
  - RED by HBO HD and BabyFirst ceased broadcast at midnight on 1 October 2019.
  - Now International HD and Now Chinese Drama On Demand ceased broadcast at midnight, 15 November 2019.
- 2020
  - Now Baogu Movies HD ceased and broadcasting transmission on 1 March 2020 and transitioned to its VOD service.
  - UTV Movies and Animax HD ceased broadcasting and transmission at midnight on 1 July 2020 due to Animax HD's low popularity, but relaunched on 1 October 2021. Replaced by YuppThirai HD.
- 2021
  - Comedy Central HD officially ceased broadcasting and transmission on 31 January 2021, but Comedy Central HD On Demand is still available. Replaced by GEM HD on1 October 2021.
  - NTV7 rebranded to DidikTV KPM on 17 February 2021.
  - The 2021 Summer Olympics ceased broadcasting and transmission on 8 August 2021. Replaced by Unifi Sports HD.
  - Blue Ant Entertainment HD and Blue Ant Extreme HD were rebranded to ROCK Entertainment HD and ROCK Extreme HD on 1 September 2021.
  - SCM Legend HD, SCM HD, Star Chinese Channel HD, FOX Movies HD, FOX Action Movies HD, FOX Family Movies HD, FOX HD, FX HD, FOXlife HD, National Geographic HD, National Geographic Wild HD, Nat Geo People HD, BabyTV, Sky News HD, FOX Sports HD, FOX Sports 2 HD and FOX Sports 3 HD officially ceased transmission on 30 September 2021. The shows from these terminated channels are now carried by Disney+ Hotstar.
- 2022
  - Sony MAX, Sony SAB, and Sony SET officially ceased transmission on 1 January 2022.
  - Now Baogu Movies HD On Demand ceased broadcast on 1 June 2022.
  - Colors, Jaya Max, Polimer, and Yupp Thirai HD ceased ceased transmission and was replaced by WION, Sony YAY!, and Zee Thirai on 1 July 2022.
  - Unifi Sports 5 HD ceased transmission on 31 August 2022. Replaced by beIN Sports 4 HD.
  - HyppSensasi HD and HyppInspirasi HD were rebranded to Sensasi HD and Inspirasi HD on 1 September 2022.
  - ROCK Extreme HD rebranded as ROCK Action HD on 12 December 2022.
- 2023
  - Unifi Sports 2 HD, Unifi Sports 3 HD & Unifi Sports 4 HD ceased transmission on 31 January 2023 because the broadcaster's rights to the Malaysia League ended. Replaced by beIN Sports 2 HD.
  - TechStorm, LAKU Mall HD and Arirang ceased transmission on 31 January 2023, barely 15 months after the channel launched. Replaced by ONE HD and Moonbug Kids. The first Korean channel to cease transmission on Unifi TV.
  - Boomerang HD rebranded back as Cartoonito HD on 28 July 2023.
- 2024
  - CinemaWorld HD ceased transmission on 1 January 2024. Replaced by HITS NOW HD.
  - Paramount Network HD ceased transmission on 31 March 2024.
  - GEM HD was ceased broadcast on 31 July 2024.
  - The 2024 Summer Olympics ceased transmission on 12 August 2024. Replaced by Unifi Sports HD.
- 2025
  - Cartoonito HD and WION ceased transmission on 1 January 2025.
  - ONE HD ceased transmission on 1 February 2025 after barely 2 years.
  - Now Jelli HD, Luxe.TV HD, MTV Live HD, and France 24 ceased transmission on 1 July 2025.
  - Travel Channel HD ceased transmission and was replaced by Asian Food Network HD on 1 July 2025.
- 2027
  - CBeebies HD, BBC Earth HD, BBC Lifestyle HD and BBC News HD ceased transmission on 1 January 2027.

=== Former Tonton Malaysia channels ===
- 2021
  - CNA HD and Al Jazeera HD ceased transmission on 12 October 2021.
- 2024
  - GEM HD ceased transmission on 31 July 2024.
- 2025
  - tvN HD ceased transmission on 1 January 2025.
  - Animax HD ceased transmission on 1 May 2025.
- 2026
  - tvN Movies HD ceased transmission on 1 February 2026.

=== Former HBO Max live TV channels ===
- 2021
  - RED by HBO HD ceased broadcasting and transmission on 30 June 2021 due to a lack of advertisements.

=== Former MYTV Mana Mana live TV channels ===
- 2024
  - MotoRRacing TV HD
  - Horizon Sports HD
  - My Cinema Europe HD
  - British Muslim TV
  - TVRI Nasional HD
- 2025
  - TVRI World HD
  - SEA Today HD

=== Other pay television providers ===
- 2001
  - Mega TV ceased transmission on 30 September 2001.
- 2016
  - eTV ceased transmission on 28 February 2016.
  - ABNXcess ceased transmission in 2016.
  - Fine TV
- 2022
  - Sirius TV
- 2025
  - OK Vision ceased transmission in 2025.

=== Former Malaysian Channels From Other Countries ===
- 2020
  - Astro Vellithirai and Astro Vinmeen HD ceased broadcasting and transmission from Singtel TV on 30 June 2020. Replaced by KTV HD and Sun Music.
- 2025
  - Astro Citra HD and Astro Maya HD ceased broadcasting and transmission from Singtel TV on 30 November 2025. Replaced by Drama Sangat TV3 HD.

=== TV channels ===
- 1985
  - Rangkaian Ketiga ceased broadcasting and transmission on 31 July 1985. Replaced by RTM2 on the same date.
- 1999
  - MetroVision ceased broadcasting and transmission on 31 October 1999 but relaunched as 8TV on 8 January 2004.
- 2005
  - Channel 9 was on hiatus and paused by 31 January 2005 due to low viewership but relaunched of TV9 on 22 April 2006.
- 2008
  - TV Pendidikan ceased broadcasting and transmission on 31 December 2008. Replaced by EduWebTV on March 1 2008.
- 2009
  - RTMi was replaced by Muzik Aktif following its relaunch on 16 March 2009.
- 2011
  - Muzik Aktif was replaced by TVi following its relaunch on 11 April 2011.
- 2012
  - tvN HD, changed its name to Channel M HD on 23 November 2012. On 3 June 2016, the channel reverted to its current name.
  - WBC has been closed down since October 2012 due to financial problems.
- 2018
  - TVi was replaced by TV Okey following its relaunch on 21 March 2018.
  - CJ Wow Shop ceased broadcasting and transmission on 31 December 2018. Later, CJ Wow Shop broadcasts again from 15 April 2019 (excluding Unifi TV).
- 2019
  - Channel W was discontinued on 31 March 2019 and replaced by TVS on myFreeview on 6 February 2021.
- 2022
  - Astro GO Shop (Malay) ceased broadcasting on myFreeview on 19 June 2022.
  - Wow Shop (Chinese) ceased broadcasting on myFreeview on 2 November 2022.
- 2023
  - Wow Shop (Malay) ceased broadcasting on myFreeview on 8 November 2023.
- 2024
  - Awesome TV ceased broadcasting and transmission on Astro on 1 August 2024 as part of the company's strategic plan to become a "fully virtual platform".
- 2026
  - SUKE TV ceased broadcasting and transmission on myFreeview on 31 March 2026.
  - TV6 ceased broadcasting and transmission on MYTV on 30 June 2026.
