= Astro Kirana =

Malaysian satellite TV channel

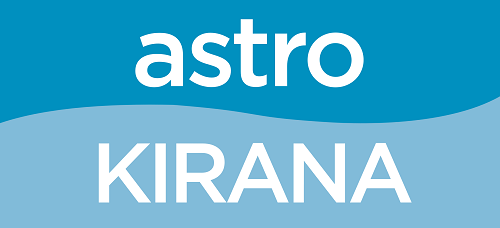
- Country: Malaysia

Programming
- Languages: English, Malay, Chinese, Tamil

Ownership
- Sister channels: Astro Ria; Astro Prima; Astro Oasis; Astro Aruna; Astro Awani; Astro Ceria; Astro hitz Astro SuperSport; Astro AEC; Astro AOD; Astro Hua Hee Dai; Astro Shuang Xing; Astro Wah Lai Toi; Astro Xiao Tai Yang; Astro Vaanavil; Astro Vellithirai; Astro Box Office Movies; Astro Xpresi

History
- Launched: 31 August 2006
- Closed: 18 May 2009
- Replaced by: Astro Citra; TVS(Astro Channel Space)

Links
- Website: www.astro.com.my

Astro Kirana was a Malaysian satellite television channel dedicated to airing Asian and European films, a 24-hour Malaysian film channel owned by Astro, launched on 31 August 2006 alongside Astro Aruna.

== Background ==
=== Astro Kirana in Malaysia ===
The Astro Kirana broadcast, however, was removed from the channel list and stopped on May 18, 2009. Astro stopped the Astro Kirana broadcast because the broadcast only got a viewing ratio of 2% compared to the Astro Ria channel's 12%.

This channel is now known as Astro Citra and later this channel number was also replaced by TVS which started broadcasting officially on Astro on 10 October 2020.

=== Number change ===
The following are the number changes available at Astro Kirana:

- On 31 August 2006, Astro Kirana could be watched via Astro on channel 43 because it was set to celebrate the 49th National Day.
- On 23 December 2006, Astro Kirana was renumbered from channel 43 to channel 23.
- On October 1, 2007, Astro Kirana's introductory number will be changed to 3 digits which is 122.
- On May 18, 2009, Astro Kirana was officially discontinued
