= 8TV (Malaysian TV network) =

Malaysia Chinese-language free-to-air television network

八度空间 8TV
- Current logo, an iteration of the 2004 logo, used since 2018
- Country: Malaysia
- Broadcast area: List: Malaysia; Singapore; Brunei; Thailand (Southern Thailand); Indonesia (West and North Kalimantan and Riau Islands); Philippines (Southern Palawan and Tawi-Tawi)
- Headquarters: Balai Berita, Bangsar, Kuala Lumpur, Malaysia

Programming
- Languages: Mandarin; English (2004–2018)
- Picture format: 16:9 1080i HDTV (downscaled to 16:9 576i for the SDTV feed)

Ownership
- Owner: Media Prima
- Parent: Metropolitan TV Sdn Bhd
- Sister channels: TV3; DidikTV KPM; TV9; Wow Shop; Drama Sangat

History
- Founded: 14 August 1984; 42 years ago (as Metropolitan TV Sdn Bhd)
- Launched: 1 July 1995; 31 years ago (as MetroVision); 8 January 2004; 22 years ago (as 8TV)
- Founder: Tan Sri Tunku Abdullah
- Closed: 1 November 1999; 26 years ago (as MetroVision)
- Former names: MetroVision (1 July 1995 – 1 November 1999)

Links
- Website: www.tonton.com.my

Availability

Terrestrial
- MYTV: Channel 108 (HD)
- Astro/NJOI: Channel 148 (SD)
- Unifi TV: Channel 108 (HD)

Streaming media
- Tonton: Watch live (HD)

8TV
- Traditional Chinese: 八度空間
- Simplified Chinese: 八度空间
Transcriptions
Yue: Cantonese
- Jyutping: Baat3 Dou6 Hung1 Gaan1
Southern Min
- Hokkien POJ: Poeh-tō͘ Khong-kan

Evolution of Media Prima
- 1974: The New Straits Times Press is founded
- 1984: TV3 is launched
- 1985: Renong Berhad acquired TV3 and NSTP from Fleet Group
- 1993: Malaysian Resources Corporation Berhad acquires TV3 and NSTP from Renong Berhad
- 1995: MetroVision is launched Mega TV began operations Akademi TV3 is founded Grand Brilliance is founded Ambang Klasik is founded
- 1998: ntv7 is launched
- 1999: MetroVision ceased operations
- 2000: Profitune is founded Akademi TV3 renamed as the Malaysia Institute of Integrative Media (MIIM); NSTP divested Berita Publishing to Alaf Positif
- 2001: Mega TV ceased operations MRCB announces its intent to divested equity interest in TV3 and NSTP and transferred them to Profitune
- 2002: Profitune renamed as Media Prima; Ambang Klasik ceased operations
- 2003: Corporate restructuring of MRCB and divestiture of TV3 and NSTP by MRCB is completed Media Prima began operations and acquires MetroVision; Channel 9 is launched TV3 divested MIIM to SAL Group of Colleges
- 2004: MetroVision is relaunched and renamed as 8TV
- 2005: Channel 9 ceased operations Media Prima acquires ntv7 and Channel 9 Fly FM is launched
- 2006: Hot FM is launched Channel 9 relaunched and renamed as TV9
- 2007: Catch-Up TV is launched Gua.com.my is launched
- 2008: Primeworks Studios is founded
- 2009: One FM is launched
- 2011: Emas is launched MIIM ceased operations
- 2012: Media Prima Digital is founded
- 2014: Emas ceased operations
- 2015: Media Prima acquires Copyright Laureate which owns Ultra FM and Pi Mai FM
- 2016: Kool FM is launched CJ Wow Shop is launched
- 2017: Media Prima acquires REV Asia Holdings; Drama Sangat is launched
- 2018: Media Prima Radio Networks rebranded as Ripple Media
- 2020: Media Prima Omnia is launched CJ Wow Shop renamed as Wow Shop
- 2021: Ripple Media rebranded as Media Prima Audio; Kool FM and One FM rebranded as Buletin FM and 8FM respectively
- 2022: Molek FM is launched
- 2023: Buletin FM rebranded as Kool 101; 8FM renamed as Eight FM
- 2025: Kool 101 reverted into Kool FM

Metropolitan TV Sdn Bhd, operating as 8TV (Chinese: 八度空间), is a Malaysian Chinese-language free-to-air television network focused on the Chinese community of Malaysia. It is owned and operated by Media Prima. The channel formerly existed as MetroVision from 1 July 1995 until 1 November 1999 and was relaunched as 8TV on 8 January 2004.

Its programming consists of mostly dramas, sitcoms and reality shows made in Chinese, either produced in Malaysia or imported from other countries. As of 2023, 8TV has captured 81% of its Chinese viewership according to a Nielsen survey.

== History ==
=== As MetroVision ===
Plans for a fourth channel or television station were revealed in August 1989. It was set to be called TV4 and planned to launch in January 1990 with initial coverage limited to the Klang Valley. One of its applicants, Melewar Group Berhad, stated that the channel would air entertainment and sports programs. The new channel was intended to be "another step towards diversifying sources of home entertainment." However, the plan was canceled the following month because the government felt that the existing TV channels were adequate to meet the country's "present needs."

The establishment of TV4 received approval from the Cabinet in September 1991 and was expected to begin transmission in January 1992 in the Klang Valley.

The plan was revived in January 1992, with the application period beginning in September of the same year. One of the applicants was the Utusan Group – the then-parent company of Utusan Malaysia, – which aimed to establish a separate company and have its studios based on its own plot of land at Mukim Batu, Selangor, if it obtained the license. Other applicants included Rediffusion Cable Network Sdn Bhd (now primarily known as RCE Commerce Sdn. Bhd.), which owned a cable radio station, and the returning Melewar Group.

Fauzi Abdul Rahman, the then-Parliamentary Secretary of the Information Ministry, said in May 1992 at the Parliament House that TV4 was likely to be set up by early 1993 and would be awarded a tender by June 1992, but it was delayed until August before it began its broadcast.

In June 1993, the license was granted to a consortium of four companies, which included The Utusan Group, planning to launch in 1994, but later delayed to January 1995 and eventually to 18 February. In December 1994, City Television Sdn Bhd applied for a broadcasting license, pending approval from the Ministry of Information. By the end of January 1995, the license had been finalized.

The owners invested RM 45 million in the new channel, with RM 30 million allocated for the channel's operations. They also planned to gradually increase the proportion of programming in Malay to 60%, as required by its license. In February 1995, MetroVision postponed its program transmission due to feeder cable damage during shipment from Japan and rescheduled it for mid-March. It was announced on 23 May 1995 that the channel would commence full broadcasts in the third quarter of 1995. The channel stated that it adhered to guidelines set by the government before beginning its broadcast.

MetroVision started broadcasting on 1 July 1995 at 6:30 pm, with the official launch on 18 September 1995 at the Putra World Trade Centre. It was managed by City Television, which eventually renamed as Metropolitan TV, a company owned by Tan Sri Tunku Abdullah, part of the Melewar Group Berhad and a member of the Negeri Sembilan royal family. Other shareholders included the Utusan Melayu (Malaysia) Berhad, Medanmas Sdn Bhd (now primarily known as Ch-9 Media Sdn. Bhd.), and Diversified Systems Sdn. Bhd., which was owned and controlled by Tan Sri Kamarul Ariffin. Its studios were located at Subang Hi-Tech Industrial Park in Shah Alam, Selangor. MetroVision transmitted on UHF channel 27 from Gunung Ulu Kali (near Genting Highlands). Its signal, spanning a radius of 50 km, covered the Klang Valley and parts of Seremban and Rawang, reaching as far as Tanjung Karang and Seremban. Its target market was "15- to 39-year-olds from urban middle and upper class dual-income households who have high English-language comprehension".

Its prime-time Malay news bulletin, Warta Prima, originally aired at 7:30 pm to avoid competition with other channels. It later moved to 8 pm in October 1995 to comply with government rulings.

In September 1995, MetroVision proposed to commence 24-hour broadcasts and use English as its broadcasting medium, but the proposal was rejected by the government. On 12 October 1995, MetroVision became the first in the world to introduce interactive television, presented in a phone-in quiz format. The service was provided by Articulate Interactive Sdn Bhd (formerly known as Success Mission Sdn Bhd) with telephone systems provided by Audiotel Sdn Bhd (now primarily known as Articulate New Media Sdn. Bhd.).

In October 1995, MetroVision dropped the airing of Taiwanese drama Justice Bao for a week, prompting the government to amend the Censorship Board Regulations and Broadcasting Code of Ethics to allow "costume dramas" to air. The drama series was acquired by JV Media Sales Sdn Bhd (now primarily known as Juita Viden Media Services Sdn. Bhd.).

By 1996, seven percent of MetroVision's programming was foreign; its primetime programming was mostly in English and Chinese. Nickelodeon programmes aired on Saturday and Sunday mornings. The station had 75 employees.

MetroVision had problems with the scheduling of its programs; due to the introduction of the classification system, The Bold and the Beautiful, which used to air in the afternoon, had to be moved to late evenings.

By the end of 1996, MetroVision was sold to a new owner. In February 1997, the Melewar Group confirmed that it had divested its equity stake in MetroVision. In July the same year, MetroVision and TV3 were ordered by the Ministry of Information to relocate their transmitters to the Kuala Lumpur Tower. Beginning in early 1998, MetroVision introduced dual audio channels in its transmissions. Later in June 1998, MetroVision received approval from the government to broadcast nationwide but did not prepare for the move, citing "reduced revenues from advertisements due to economic downturn" as a reason. In August 1998, the channel launched its official website, which remained active only until its closure. MetroVision also planned to expand its broadcast transmission beyond the Klang Valley.

=== Suspension and attempts at revival ===
Due to the Asian financial crisis and competition from other channels and pay-TV operators (such as Astro, Mega TV and NTV7), MetroVision shut down on 1 November 1999. The operator promised to restart the channel in March 2000 after a supposed "signal upgrade," but that did not materialize. The staff and personalities of MetroVision have since moved to different media companies after its shutdown.

In March 2001, MetroVision – then tentatively named Channel 8 (Note: The 'Channel 8' brand was originally introduced in 1994.) – was bought by Arab-Malaysian Corporation Berhad (now primarily known as Amcorp Group Berhad), which is owned and controlled by Tan Sri Azman Hashim. The corporation also owned Radio Rediffusion Sdn Bhd (now primarily known as Star RFM Sdn. Bhd.) and planned to operate the dormant station for 10 years under the new name, Redi8.

In 2002, Pengurusan Danaharta Nasional announced that it had assumed control of MetroVision, but later divested from it. Star Media Group, the parent company of The Star, rejected a proposal to acquire MetroVision, stating that there were no plans for discussions to buy the channel.

In 2003, the newly established Media Prima announced its intent to acquire MetroVision, believing it could "dominate the broadcasting industry". The conglomerate also held talks with the operator's Special Administrators regarding the possibility of reviving the channel, positioning it as an "important component" in its business operations. On 24 October 2003, the name 8TV was unveiled to the public as part of Media Prima's plan to relaunch MetroVision.

=== Relaunch as 8TV and early history ===
On 8 January 2004, MetroVision was relaunched and rebranded as 8TV under its operating company, Metropolitan TV Sdn Bhd, after the company was acquired by Media Prima in 2003. Initially, the channel featured a mix of Chinese, Malay and English content. Throughout its history, the content gradually shifted towards predominantly Chinese programming as more of it was added to the channel's broadcasting schedule. Mandarin is now used in all of its news broadcasts, although there was also a short-lived Malay news broadcast available in the channel's early years.

On 1 October 2004, 8TV became available on the Astro platform.

On 6 September 2007, 8TV along with its sister channels, TV3, NTV7 and TV9, became available for online viewing via Media Prima's newly launched streaming service, Catch-Up TV, which later rebranded as Tonton.

Media Prima announced on 15 October 2024 that the news operations of all of its television networks, including 8TV, will began broadcast at the company's Balai Berita starting 21 October after more than two decades operated at Sri Pentas, Bandar Utama. On 12 March 2025, 15 days after the Sri Pentas building were closed, all of the company's TV networks logo, including 8TV, were removed from its former building.

=== Programme rescheduling ===
A program reschedule was implemented on 1 April 2016, with almost all Chinese programs shown from Saturdays to Tuesdays, while English programs retained their usual time slots on Wednesdays to Fridays. However, by June 2017, the channel only broadcast one English program, which aired every Friday.

The rescheduling also includes a 3-hour morning home shopping block titled Wow Shop (renamed as CJ Wow Shop), a collaboration between 8TV and the Korean conglomerate CJ Group, which had also been introduced across other Media Prima channels, with some more affected by the changes (especially sister channels NTV7 and TV9). However, this block has attracted huge criticism on social media as it replaced a large part of the daytime schedule, which previously consisted mostly of reruns, religious programming, and kids programming. Initially broadcast in Malay on the channel like its sister channels, it began airing in Mandarin starting from 8 January 2017 onwards.

In 2017, this channel signed a strategic cooperation agreement with the China International Communication Center. On 5 March 2018, 8TV became the first independent Chinese-language television channel, and all of 8TV's English programming was moved to NTV7, while NTV7's Mandarin programming was moved to 8TV as early as March 2018, due to the former changing its audience focus. On 8 June 2020, the day after Mandarin 7 aired its last edition on NTV7, 8TV's Primetime Mandarin News was extended to 1 hour.

On 11 February 2021, the channel started its HDTV broadcasting in conjunction with Chinese New Year, exclusively available through MYTV DTT service on channel 108.

On 4 May 2021, the channel began broadcasting 24 hours a day due to the launch of Eight FM, which simulcasts radio programming every midnight.

== Criticism and controversies ==
In 2004, during the UEFA Euro 2004, 8TV allegedly aired an ad for the liquor manufacturer Carlsberg, the football telecast's sponsor. As a result, the Malaysian Communications and Multimedia Commission (MCMC) imposed a fine of RM50,000 on 8TV in accordance with the provisions of Section 242 of the Communications and Multimedia Act 1998.

On 13 January 2008, during its 4th anniversary, singer-songwriter Faizal Tahir took off his shirt to reveal his chest on stage during the live broadcast. On 19 January 2008, the MCMC announced that they suspended live and delayed entertainment programs on 8TV for three months, effective from 15 January 2008.

In October of the same year, the MCMC took action against 8TV by immediately suspending its chatting service. This action came after finding that the service was "misused by viewers to find sex partners," with the possibility of a ban pending the completion of MCMC's investigation into the case.

At the beginning of the 2011 Ramadan season, 8TV aired three public service announcements that were criticized as racist and insulting to the Chinese. The advertisements depicted a Chinese woman eating openly, wearing immodest and uncivilized clothes during Ramadan, with the intention of influencing non-Muslims to respect the fasting month accordingly. Following criticism from various parties, including Muslims who were offended by the advertisements, they were eventually withdrawn.

== Logo history ==
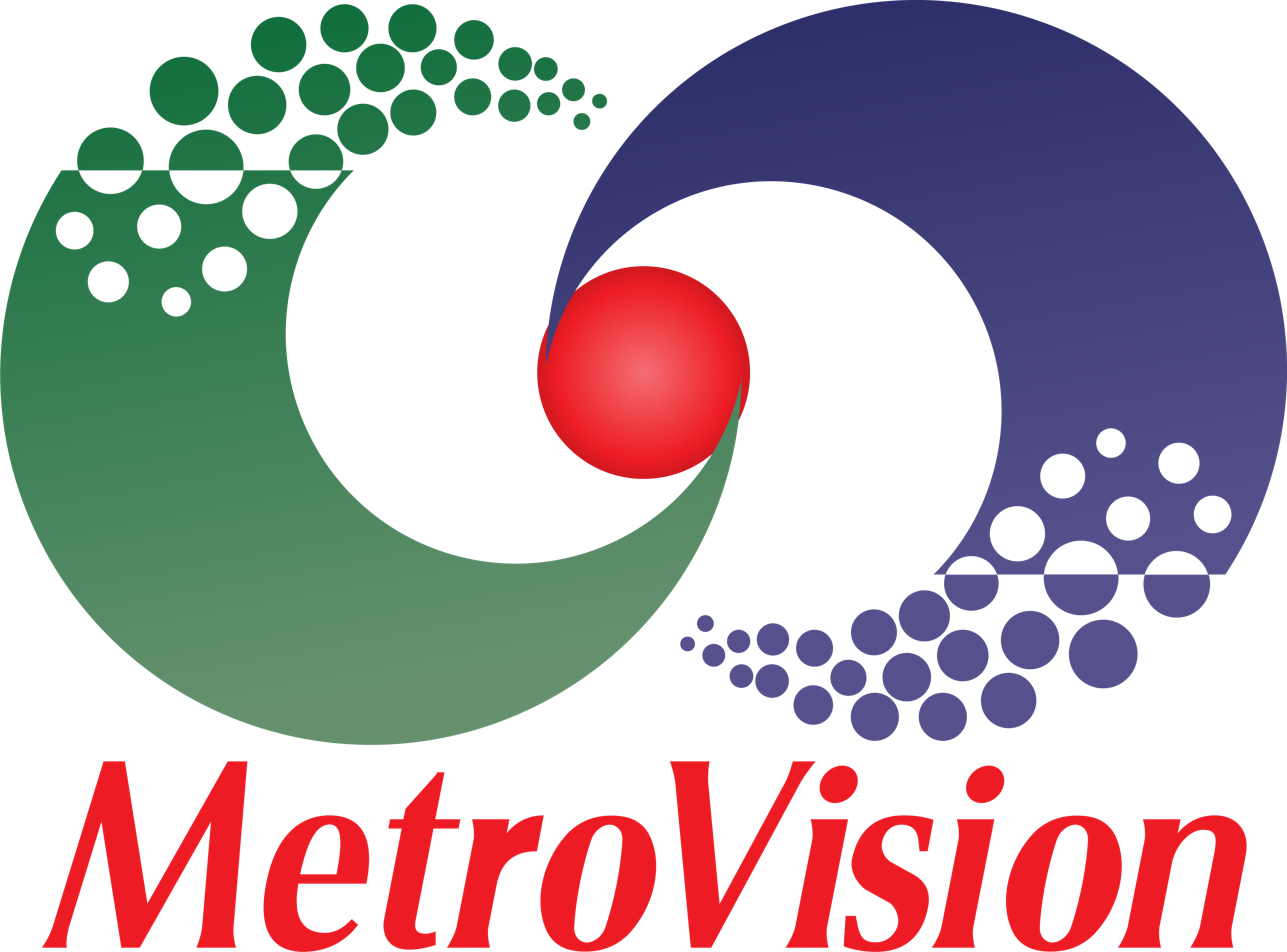
MetroVision logo, used from 1 July 1995 to 1 November 1999.

Logos used by 8TV throughout its history, used from 19 December 2003 to 2018. Left in orange for English programmings (2004–2018) and Right in pink for Chinese programmings (2004–present).

8TV Mandarin News logo, used since 8 April 2022.

8TV Mandarin News colorful variant logo, used since 8 April 2022.

== See also ==
- List of television stations in Malaysia
- TV3
- NTV7
- TV9
- Media Prima
