= Hypp Sports HD =

Malaysian IPTV sports network

HyppSports HD
- Country: Malaysia
- Broadcast area: Malaysia

Programming
- Language: English
- Picture format: 16:9 (HDTV)

Ownership
- Owner: Telekom Malaysia Berhad
- Sister channels: Dunia Sinema HD; HyppInspirasi HD; HyppSensasi HD; Pesona HD; Salam HD

History
- Launched: 15 September 2012
- Closed: 1 August 2018
- Replaced by: Unifi Sports

Links
- Website: https://unifi.com.my/tv

Availability

Streaming media
- unifi playTV: Watch live (Malaysia only)

HyppSports was an in-house IPTV network of channels in Malaysia dedicated to broadcasting sports-related content 24 hours a day. It was available exclusively on unifi TV via Channel 701 (HD) to subscribers of either stand-alone channel pack, Ultimate Pack, or any of the ethnic-curated packs (Aneka Plus, Ruby Plus, or Varnam Plus).

Launched in 2012 as one of unifi TV original channels, HyppSports Illustrated 1 (a joint venture of unifi TV and Sports Illustrated Asia) offered international sporting events in sports such as football, badminton, motorsport, rugby, volleyball and golf. unifi TV also operated two sister channels, HyppSports Illustrated 2 and HyppSports 3 on Channels 702 & 703 respectively, along with a high definition simulcast of all channels.

== HyppSports 2 ==
HyppSports 2 HD
- Country: Malaysia
- Broadcast area: Malaysia

Programming
- Language: English
- Picture format: 16:9 (HDTV)

Ownership
- Owner: Telekom Malaysia Berhad

History
- Launched: 15 September 2012
- Closed: 1 August 2018
- Replaced by: Unifi Sports 2

Availability

Streaming media
- unifi playTV: Watch live (Malaysia only)

HyppSports Illustrated 2 is the first sister channel of HyppSports Illustrated 1. Launched on 15 November 2012, it is broadcast on unifi TV via Channel 702 in high-definition. Sporting events that are aired on this network include the American competitions like NFL and NHL and the Mexican competitions like Copa MX. On 1 August 2018, the channel, along with HyppSports 1 HD will be off-aired on unifi TV due to declining popularity of viewers.

== HyppSports 3 ==
HyppSports 3 HD
- Country: Malaysia
- Broadcast area: Malaysia

Programming
- Language: English
- Picture format: 16:9 (HDTV)

Ownership
- Owner: Telekom Malaysia Berhad

History
- Launched: 15 September 2012
- Closed: 1 January 2019
- Replaced by: Unifi Sports 3

Availability

Streaming media
- unifi playTV: Watch live (Malaysia only)

HyppSports 3 is the second sister channel of HyppSports. Launched in 2012, it is broadcast on Channel 703 in high-definition. This channel is the home of Bundesliga, International Champions Cup, with exclusive and extensive live coverage of football matches and behind-the-scenes feature curated for fans.

== HyppSports 4 ==
HyppSports 4 HD
- Country: Malaysia
- Broadcast area: Malaysia
- Network: Telekom Malaysia

Programming
- Language: English
- Picture format: 16:9 (HDTV)

Ownership
- Owner: HyppTV

History
- Launched: 15 September 2012
- Closed: 1 July 2017 (replaced); 1 April 2018 (ceased transmission)
- Replaced by: HyppSports Plus – unifi Malaysia Super League; Unifi Sports 4

Availability

Streaming media
- unifi playTV: Watch live (Malaysia only)

HyppSports 4 was the third sister channel of HyppSports. Launched in 2012, it was broadcast on HyppTV Channel 704 in HD. This channel service ended on 1 July 2017.

On 2 February 2018, a joint-venture has been made between unifi TV and Football Malaysia LLP to bring HyppSports Plus – unifi Malaysia Super League HD channel, where it is dedicated to the live football matches of the 2018 Malaysia League. The channel then replace the defunct HyppSports 4 HD on Channel 704 for a limited time only. Selected live matches are also available for telecast on HyppSports 3 HD (Channel 703).
