= Kirana =

Kirana may refer to:

- Kirana gharana, a Hindustani music apprenticeship tradition
- Kirana Hills, Pakistan
  - Kirana-I, a series of 24 cold-tests conducted by Pakistan during 1983–1990 in the Kirana Hills
  - Kirana Bar, a hilly area named after the Kirana Hills
- Kirana store, a small neighborhood retail store in the Indian Subcontinent
- Kirana Ti, a Star Wars character
- Alternative romananization of the Indic word Kiran
- Astro Kirana, a Malaysian satellite television channel
