= Astro TVIQ =

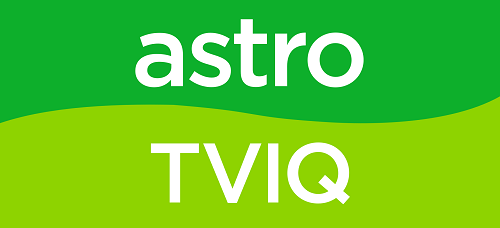
- Country: Malaysia; Brunei; Singapore

Programming
- Languages: English; Malay (selected programs only, formerly including promo this channel); Mandarin (selected programs only)

Ownership
- Owner: Astro
- Sister channels: Astro Ceria; Astro Tutor TV; Astro Xiao Tai Yang

History
- Launched: 14 October 2002; 23 years ago
- Closed: 1 February 2022; 4 years ago
- Replaced by: Astro Ceria; TA-DAA!

Links
- Website: astro.com.my

Astro TVIQ (formerly known as TVIQ) was an English-language (formerly both hybrid language Malay-language and English-language) channel. This channel was free as it was grouped under the Astro Family package. The target audience were children between the ages of 4 to 15.

== History ==
Up until its closure, it was on Astro channel 610. It was available in 3 audio languages such as English, Malay and Chinese, and provided subtitles in Malay and English. In Indonesia, it was formerly available on channel 20 via Astro Nusantara.

Programmes on this network was all based on education, exploration, arts, handicraft, science, learning, English, motivation, and mathematics.

The programmes that were shown on this channel are taken from a few of the popular international television stations such as from the British Broadcasting Corporation (BBC), Okto, and programmes from the United States and Australia. Astro TVIQ also broadcast some in-house programmes. For some time in March 2006, some G4 programmes were moved to this channel from TV Pendidikan.

In July 2009, Astro TVIQ introduced new programme blocks: CoolSchool (Sekolahku (Malay)), aimed at the 7-to-14 age group; NightSchool, aimed at adults; and PlaySchool, aimed at children below 6. The channel also introduced hourly one-minute lessons called Just One Minute With TVIQ as well.

Since January 2010, it has broadcast selected foreign programmes dubbed in Bahasa Malaysia and later added Chinese in February 2009.

From 25 May 2021, this channel was available in HD and their existing programme blocks were discontinued.

From 1 June 2021, English became the sole language for Astro TVIQ programme promotions but selected Malay programs still aired on this channel.

After almost 20 years of broadcasting, Astro TVIQ ceased transmission on 1 February 2022, with programming dispersed to Astro Ceria and TA-DAA!.

== Programme blocks (July 2009 – May 2021) ==
- CoolSchool (Malay: Sekolahku) – for educational programs, cartoons and live-action series
- NightSchool – For all-night educational shows
- PlaySchool – For preschoolers

== See also ==
- Astro
- Astro NJOI
- TV Pendidikan
- Astro Tutor TV
