= TA-DAA! =

- Country: Malaysia
- Headquarters: Bukit Jalil, Kuala Lumpur, Malaysia

Programming
- Language: English
- Picture format: 16:9 HDTV (1080i)

Ownership
- Owner: Astro (Measat Broadcast Network Systems)
- Parent: Astro
- Sister channels: Astro Ceria; Astro Tutor TV; Astro Xiao Tai Yang; BOO eGG Network; PRIMEtime; Showcase Movies

History
- Launched: 15 March 2021; 5 years ago
- Replaced: Astro TVIQ; Disney XD
- Closed: 1 February 2023; 3 years ago
- Replaced by: DreamWorks

TA-DAA! was a Malaysian English language children's television channel. It was owned by satellite television operator Astro, alongside its sister channels PRIMEtime, Showcase Movies (later Astro Showcase), BOO, and eGG Network.

== History ==
The channel started broadcasting on 15 March 2021, replacing Disney XD, which ceased broadcasting on 1 January 2021 and remained as a free preview channel until 4 April 2021, when it became part of the Kids Pack.

After 2 years of broadcasting, TA-DAA! ceased transmission on 1 February 2023, and was replaced by DreamWorks Channel.
