= Astro Xi Yue HD =

- Astro Xi Yue HD Official Logo
- Country: Malaysia
- Broadcast area: Malaysia; Around Asia (Via satellites)

Programming
- Languages: Mandarin; Hokkien; Cantonese
- Picture format: 16:9 (HDTV)

Ownership
- Owner: Astro (Astro Malaysia Holdings Berhad)
- Sister channels: Astro AEC; Astro AOD; Astro Hua Hee Dai; Astro Shuang Xing; Astro Quan Jia HD; Astro Wah Lai Toi; Astro Xiao Tai Yang

History
- Launched: 1 February 2015; 11 years ago
- Closed: July 1, 2019
- Replaced by: IQIYI HD

Astro Xi Yue HD (Chinese: Astro 喜悦 HD) was a free TV channel for NJOI and Astro's pay and free subscription platforms. The channel was launched during Chinese New Year on 1 February 2015. It broadcast previous programming such as dramas, movies, anime, documentaries, music and variety shows from sister channel. The last day of broadcast was 30 June 2019, replaced by iQIYI, which began its broadcast from 17 July 2019. All overseas live events were to be aired through Astro Channel 338.
