= TV Pendidikan =

Malaysian educational television network

- Country: Malaysia
- Broadcast area: List: Malaysia; Singapore; Brunei; Thailand (South Thailand, particularly Songkhla, Narathiwat, Yala and Satun); Indonesia (North Kalimantan, West Kalimantan, East Kalimantan and Riau Islands); Philippines (particularly southern Palawan and Tawi-Tawi)
- Headquarters: Balai Berita, Bangsar, Kuala Lumpur, Malaysia (current); Sri Pentas, Bandar Utama, Petaling Jaya, Selangor (after); Bukit Kiara, Kuala Lumpur (old)

Programming
- Language: Malay
- Picture format: 16:9 1080i HDTV (downscaled to 16:9 576i for the SDTV feed)

Ownership
- Owner: Ministry of Education; Media Prima
- Parent: Natseven TV Sdn. Bhd.
- Sister channels: TV3; 8TV; TV9; Wow Shop; Drama Sangat

History
- Founded: 12 November 1994; 31 years ago as Kenyalang Jasa Sdn Bhd); 7 April 1998; 28 years ago as Natseven TV Sdn. Bhd.)
- Launched: 19 June 1972; 54 years ago (as TV Pendidikan; original); 6 April 2020; 6 years ago (as TV Pendidikan; relaunch); 17 February 2021; 5 years ago (as DidikTV KPM)
- Replaced: NTV7
- Closed: 31 December 2008; 17 years ago (as TV Pendidikan; original)
- Former names: TV Pendidikan (1972–2021)

Links
- Website: didik.tv

Availability

Terrestrial
- MYTV: Channel 107 (HD)

Streaming media
- tonton: Watch live (Malaysia only) (HD)

TV Pendidikan (English: Educational TV), also abbreviated as TVP (Note: known as DidikTV KPM under Media Prima) is a Malaysian educational television network owned, produced and operated by the Educational Technology and Resources Division, Ministry of Education. The network airs educational programming for various school subjects. The network's affiliates has been changed several times, beginning with RTM (1972–1999), Astro (2000–2006), and TV9 (2007–2008), prior to 2020 relaunch.

In October 2018, the then-Education Minister Maszlee Malik announced that TV Pendidikan would be relaunched after years of long absence. The move persisted even with the change in Malaysian administration as the Ministry plans to take over most of the ntv7's timeslot under a rebrand as DidikTV KPM on 17 February 2021.

== History ==
=== Origins ===
The network's origins dates back to the 1960s when an educational television pilot project, which would later become TV Pendidikan, started on 8 June 1965 and lasted for two weeks. The theme of the pilot project was "The Air Around Us", aimed at Science students and was presented in Malay and later repeated in English.

=== As TV Pendidikan (1972–2008) ===
TV Pendidikan was officially launched on 19 June 1972 by the Second Prime Minister of Malaysia, Abdul Razak Hussein. It was later expanded to Sabah and Sarawak on 30 August 1976 and began colour broadcasts in 1979. In 1994, the Ministry of Information proposed that TV Pendidikan will become a standalone channel instead of programming block, which was later scrapped.

In April 1998, the then-Information Minister, the late Mohamed Rahmat announced the privatization of the network, where it planned to start in 1999 and only air for an hour. A study for its privatisation was being made. Plans for privatisation began as early as 1992, and "would have its own station". However, the plan for privatize the network did not materialized as TV Pendidikan is still owned by the Government.

From 3 January 2007 until 31 December 2008, TV Pendidikan was aired on Malaysia's terrestrial channel, TV9. Previously, TV Pendidikan was aired through satellite pay-TV operator Astro's Channel 28 (2000–2001) and Channel 13 (2002–2006), and Malaysia's terrestrial television channels TV1 and TV2 from 1972 to 1999 respectively.

In October 2018, the-then Education Minister, Maszlee Malik announced the relaunch of TV Pendidikan while stating that the Ministry of Education developing its own content.

TV Pendidikan was relaunched on 6 April 2020 after 12 years of absence and began airing on OKEY, one of RTM’s channels. The network made its comeback on RTM after two decades since its last broadcasting in 1999. As of 4 May 2020, The network also made its comeback on Astro since its last broadcasting in 2006 via Astro Tutor TV.

After nearly 13 years of the network's presence on TV9 since it last aired in 2008, TV Pendidikan was also made its debut through ntv7 under the name DidikTV@ntv7 on 23 November 2020. Currently, the programming slot broadcasts daily from 9am to 12pm and 3pm to 5pm.

=== As DidikTV KPM (2021–present) ===
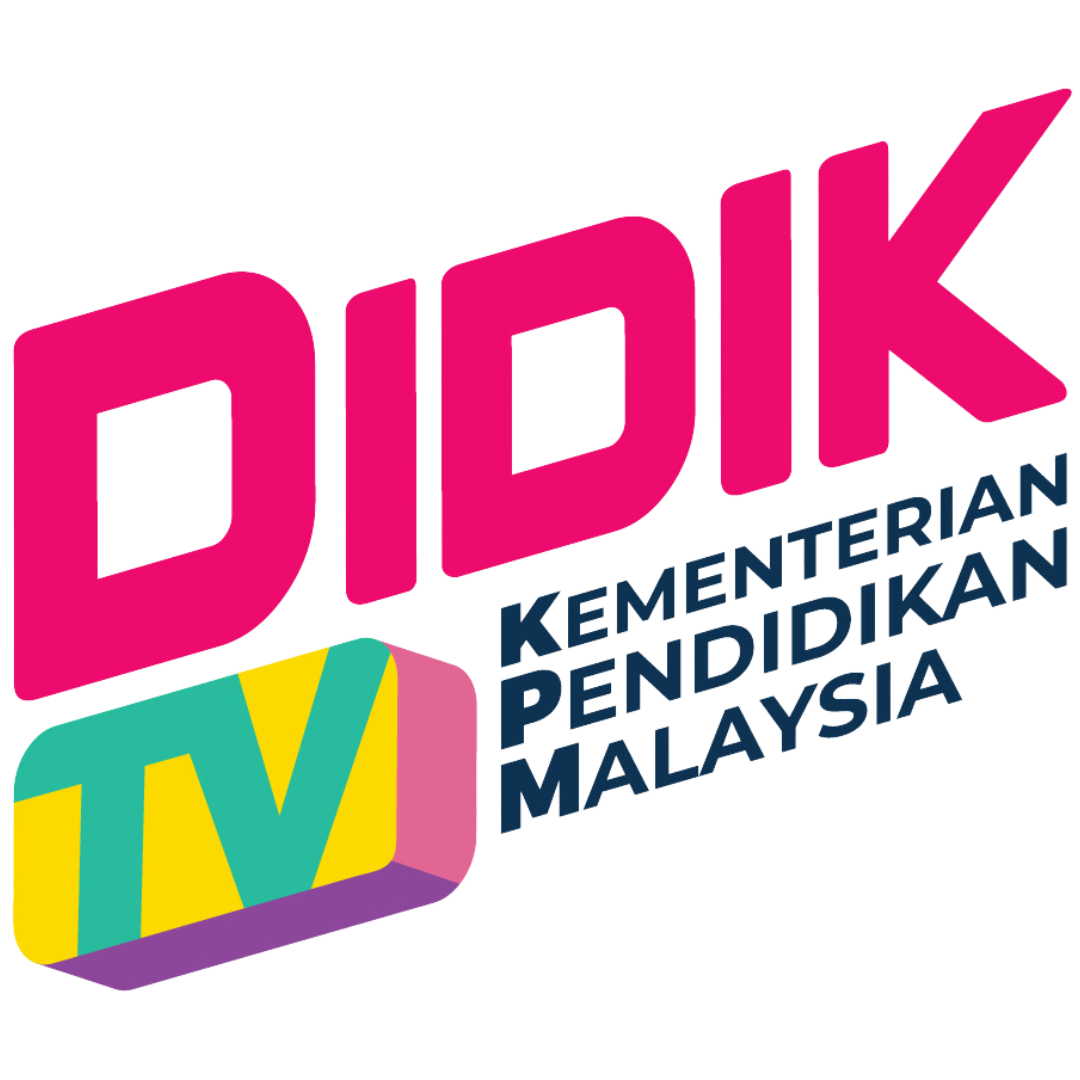
Logo of DidikTV KPM

TV Pendidikan has made a comeback on Media Prima, a decade since it last aired on TV9 in 2008. Its new home, ntv7, broadcasts a program slot known as DidikTV@ntv7 and in conjunction with the Movement Control Order (MCO) that has been set by Malaysian government on 18 March 2020. The Ministry discussions were underway with Media Prima on plans to continue the slot in 2021.

On 12 February 2021, the Ministry of Education announced that ntv7 would be refocused as an educational TV channel known as DidikTV KPM for one year starting 17 February 2021. The channel features educational content based on SPM curriculum and co-curriculum. It also provides news focusing on education, edutainment shows, and content produced by the students, as well as relevant international programming. The channel has 17 hours of airtime and runs daily from 7am to 12am.

== Operations ==
Unlike any major television networks in Malaysia, which operated during daytime hours daily; TV Pendidikan does not operated daily, even on weekends and public holidays, but rather only broadcast on Mondays to Thursdays during school times. TV Pendidikan also airs program schedule whereas the network's programs would be aired for the day and for the next day as well as programs that will be aired on the following week. The network also doesn't air advertisements during its original programming break times and they only aired after the end of programs, with most of the ads aired were primarily from government agencies like Ministry of Health, Ministry of Science, Technology and the Environment, and Filem Negara Malaysia. Clips of TV Pendidikan programs also aired sometimes, which was placed between two program slots.

== Provider timeline ==
=== Radio Televisyen Malaysia (1972–1999, 2020–present) ===
TV Pendidikan was on RTM for 27 years, from 1972 to 1999. It was aired on TV1 from Monday to Thursday in two sessions; i.e. from 7:20am to 1pm and 2pm to 5pm. Daytime transmissions on TV1 and TV3 (owned by Media Prima) was introduced in 1994, and TV2 continued the broadcast through 1999. Also, the closing time was moved to 3pm in 1997.

The network made its return on RTM on 6 April 2020 via OKEY.

=== Astro (2000–2006, 2020–2023) ===
It was announced in 1999 that TV Pendidikan would be moved to Astro, a satellite television platform in next year. The move, however, received much criticism from many parties, demanding that the network should remain aired on RTM at least until 2002. The new station was allocated on Channel 28 aired from Mondays to Thursdays at 9am to 5pm, the rest of its shared airspace was occupied by Animal Planet.

TV Pendidikan then moved to Channel 13 in January 2002 where it was split into two separate networks:

- TV Pendidikan on Mondays to Thursdays at the morning and the afternoon hours, and
- TechTV, an American computer and technology-oriented channel airing in the remaining hours. The slot still remained even as TechTV became G4techTV and later G4.

Since 1 March 2006, all G4 programs were shifted to air on Astro TVIQ, whereas the remaining channel space only showed general educational programming. Channel 13 ended service on the Astro platform on 1 January 2007, therefore G4 programs were no longer airing on Astro TVIQ either. In-house programming would not be around for 13 years before 4 May 2020, TV Pendidikan returned to Astro through Astro Tutor TV UPSR and Astro Tutor TV SPM.

On 4 May 2020, TV Pendidikan reemerged on the Astro platform through its in-house channels catered to school levels: Astro Tutor TV UPSR for primary students, and Astro Tutor TV SPM for secondary students.

=== TV9 (2007–2008) ===
TV Pendidikan's broadcasting hours was from 8am to 12pm Mondays to Thursdays, weekly but public holidays. The program's episodes are changed every two weeks. For the first time since 2007, TV Pendidikan placed a permanent logo at the top-left of the screen and aired simultaneously with the TV9 logo at the top-right only during four hours of programming.

TV Pendidikan ceased broadcasting on 31 December 2008. It was later replaced by EduWebTV.

=== EduWebTV (2009–2019) ===
EduWebTV is the official digital content hub by the Ministry of Education which has been introduced on 1 March 2008. It was the first project of its kind in the world. Bridging the digital divide is perhaps the most important factor in ensuring that education reaches every fraction of society. EduWebTV consists of four channels, which are Berita (news), Rancangan Khas (special programming), Kurikulum (curriculum), and Panduan (guidances). The Ministry embarked on EduWebTV to replace and to improve the delivery of TV Pendidikan. It was aimed at addressing the limitation of using educational television where teachers are unable to fit in the school period.

Teachers can use relevant video clips to support classroom lessons. This allows students to see the content, which may help their understanding.

EduWebTV also promotes self-learning among students. Students can access the videos and the day's homework from the website by logging on with a password created by the teacher. Students can hand over their homework via email or using conventional exercise book.

== Programming ==
The network covers nine subjects for secondary school:

- Malay
- English
- Mathematics
- Science
- History
- Geography
- Technical and Vocational
- Islamic Studies
- Moral Studies

For primary school, the program covers:

- Malay
- English
- Chinese
- Arabic
- Bahasa Isyarat Komunikasi (BIK)
- Mathematics
- Science
- Moral Studies
- Civic and Nationality

For Integration Special Education Program (PPKI) and Special Education School, the program covers:

- Malay For Communication (BMK)
- English For Communication (EFC)
- Bahasa Isyarat Komunikasi (BIK)
- Mathematics
- Social and Environmental Sciences (SSAS)
- Pendidikan Agama Islam (PAI)
- Vocational and Skills Studies (such as Pembuatan Roti (Bread Making), Asas Masakan (Cooking Basic), Kebun (Farming), Refleksologi (Reflexology), etc.)
- Physical education and health (PJK)

In addition, TV Pendidikan also provides special programming such as:

- Pedagogy
- Kerjaya (lit: Career) – Formerly aired in the early 2000s, produced by NHF Productions Sdn Bhd.
- Buletin Didik (lit: Education Bulletin) – Main flagship education news report.
- Laman Minda (lit: Mind Garden) – Live education-related talk show which was formerly named as Bicara in the mid-1990s.

During its time on TV9, it had also presented its programs for TV Pendidikan, such as:

- Motivasi Murid (lit: Pupil Motivation)
- Bijak Belajar (lit: Smart Learning) – First aired on TV3 in 1996.
- Anak Siapa Ni Eh? (lit: Whose Child is This?) – First aired in 2006.
- Kerjaya dan Kaunseling (lit: Career and Counseling)

TV Pendidikan also airs selected documentary films from Filem Negara Malaysia.

== See also ==
- List of television stations in Malaysia
- Radio Televisyen Malaysia
- TV3
- 8TV
- TV9
- Wow Shop
- Drama Sangat
- Astro
- Astro TVIQ
- Tech TV
- TV Okey
