= NTV7 =

Malaysian television channel

- Logo since 5 March 2018
- Country: Malaysia
- Broadcast area: Malaysia; Singapore; Brunei; Thailand (Southern Thailand); Indonesia (West and North Kalimantan and Riau Islands); Philippines (Southern Palawan and Tawi-Tawi)
- Headquarters: Balai Berita, Bangsar, Kuala Lumpur, Malaysia

Programming
- Languages: English; Malay
- Picture format: 16:9 HDTV (1080i)

Ownership
- Owner: Media Prima (Natseven TV Sdn Bhd); Ministry of Education (educational block only from 17 February)
- Sister channels: TV3; 8TV; TV9

History
- Launched: 7 April 1998; 28 years ago (ntv7); 17 February 2021; 5 years ago (DidikTV KPM) (educational block only)
- Former names: Slogans: "Saluran Ceria Anda" (1998-2008) "Your Feel Good Channel"(1998-2000, 2001-2008) "Your Amazing Feel Good Channel" (2000-2001) "Feel Good" (2008-2018) "Your Home of Feel Good" (2010-2012) "Feel It." (2018-2021) "Pembelajaran Melangkaui Bilik Darjah" (translation: Learning beyond the classroom) (2021-2025) "Ilmu Tanpa Batasan" (translation: Knowledge Without Limits) (2025-present)

Links
- Webcast: https://www.xtra.com.my/live-tv/ (Only in Malaysia)
- Website: www.xtra.com.my (Merged into Tonton Xtra's site, formerly ntv7.com.my)

Availability

Terrestrial
- MYTV: Channel 107 (HD)

Evolution of Media Prima
- 1974: The New Straits Times Press is founded
- 1984: TV3 is launched
- 1985: Renong Berhad acquired TV3 and NSTP from Fleet Group
- 1993: Malaysian Resources Corporation Berhad acquires TV3 and NSTP from Renong Berhad
- 1995: MetroVision is launched Mega TV began operations Akademi TV3 is founded Grand Brilliance is founded Ambang Klasik is founded
- 1998: ntv7 is launched
- 1999: MetroVision ceased operations
- 2000: Profitune is founded Akademi TV3 renamed as the Malaysia Institute of Integrative Media (MIIM); NSTP divested Berita Publishing to Alaf Positif
- 2001: Mega TV ceased operations MRCB announces its intent to divested equity interest in TV3 and NSTP and transferred them to Profitune
- 2002: Profitune renamed as Media Prima; Ambang Klasik ceased operations
- 2003: Corporate restructuring of MRCB and divestiture of TV3 and NSTP by MRCB is completed Media Prima began operations and acquires MetroVision; Channel 9 is launched TV3 divested MIIM to SAL Group of Colleges
- 2004: MetroVision is relaunched and renamed as 8TV
- 2005: Channel 9 ceased operations Media Prima acquires ntv7 and Channel 9 Fly FM is launched
- 2006: Hot FM is launched Channel 9 relaunched and renamed as TV9
- 2007: Catch-Up TV is launched Gua.com.my is launched
- 2008: Primeworks Studios is founded
- 2009: One FM is launched
- 2011: Emas is launched MIIM ceased operations
- 2012: Media Prima Digital is founded
- 2014: Emas ceased operations
- 2015: Media Prima acquires Copyright Laureate which owns Ultra FM and Pi Mai FM
- 2016: Kool FM is launched CJ Wow Shop is launched
- 2017: Media Prima acquires REV Asia Holdings; Drama Sangat is launched
- 2018: Media Prima Radio Networks rebranded as Ripple Media
- 2020: Media Prima Omnia is launched CJ Wow Shop renamed as Wow Shop
- 2021: Ripple Media rebranded as Media Prima Audio; Kool FM and One FM rebranded as Buletin FM and 8FM respectively
- 2022: Molek FM is launched
- 2023: Buletin FM rebranded as Kool 101; 8FM renamed as Eight FM
- 2025: Kool 101 reverted into Kool FM

Natseven TV Sdn Bhd, operating as NTV7 is a Malaysian free-to-air television channel owned by Media Prima Berhad. The third private commercial TV station in Malaysia at the time of its launch, the network focused on the urban area with various types of programmes, dramas and news. As of October 2021, NTV7 is now become the second most-watched television station in Malaysia with about 15% of its viewing share, together with TV9, despite the declining viewership of 2 free-to-air television channels.

== History ==
=== Establishment and early history (1998–2005) ===
The Sarawak company Nasional Televisyen (NTV), from Kuching, was given the green light from the Malaysian government on 5 June 1996. Under the conditions, the station would broadcast nationwide, 18 hours a day in various languages, with a minimum quota of 60% for national content. The station was owned by Mohd Effendi Norwawi's company Kenyalang Jasa Sdn Bhd. Encorp Group, another company that also owned by Effendi, holds 60% of equity interest in NTV. It planned to launch on 31 August 1997, but postponed to 25 December 1997.

Prior to NTV7's launching, the channel launches its official website in March 1998.

The channel was launched on 7 April 1998 under the entity of Natseven TV Sdn Bhd by Effendi, broadcasting daily from 6 am to 1 am the next day. Its launching ceremony was officiated by the then-fourth Prime Minister, Mahathir Mohamad on 22 May 1998. At the time of its establishment, its headquarters was located at Hicom-Glenmarie Industrial Park in Shah Alam, Selangor. It also had a studio in Kuching, Sarawak. Its first day started with the then-prime minister attending a prayer service for Eid ul-Adha prayers at a mosque in the state of Kedah. NTV7 at launch employed a staff of 250 people, with broadcast centres at Shah Alam in Selangor and had a transmitting network of ten stations, reaching peninsular Malaysia and the cities of Kuching in Sarawak and Kota Kinabalu in Sabah. There were already plans outlined for the station to go national "within a year". The slogan "Feel Good with NTV7" had the aim of creating "a happy and more enlightened" Malaysia. For years, the channel started and ended with the James Brown song I Feel Good, which became a part of NTV7's branding.

In 2001, NTV7 began using a variation of the Circle 7 logo used by the American broadcast network ABC for its several owned-and-operated and affiliated stations; the logo would stay in use until 2018.

On 19 January 2003, NTV7 aired a special tribute to the nation's longest-serving prime minister, Mahathir Mohamad at 8pm.

In 2004, NTV7 was restructured to make the motorsports events as its key revenue generator.

In 2005, NTV7 planned to be listed on the main market of Bursa Malaysia, but it would said that it "depends on the nation's media industry's current situation".

In May 2005, NTV7 in collaboration with telecommunications company, Celcom to air 24 hour news and current affairs on internet under the My News Network banner. NTV7 announced that it would begin the operations of the first Studio in the City in Galeri Bukit Bintang, Kuala Lumpur by the year-end.

In its early history, the channel offered a wide variety of programming which targets the Malaysian urban demographic including drama, comedy, entertainment, game shows, children's programmes, anime, documentaries and movies. There were also news bulletins in English, Mandarin and Malay through the 7 Edition, Mandarin 7, and Edisi 7 brands, respectively.

=== Acquisition by Media Prima (2005–2018) ===
In October the same year, Media Prima Berhad announced its acquisition of NTV7 under a price of RM90 million, effectively making the latter one of its subsidiaries. As a result, it operates from Sri Pentas, Petaling Jaya from that year onward along with three other private television channels in Malaysia: TV3, 8TV and TV9.

In December 2005, NTV7 has completed the implementation of voluntary separation scheme (VSS) on its 338 staffs who receives the scheme.

In 2006, NTV7 collaborated with Singapore media company Mediacorp to produce Chinese language programmes. It also said that it would produce local content as a preparation to exploring the export market in the future. It also projected its financial performances and intended to be debt-free.

The channel dominates 25% of television advertising market in March 2007.

On 6 September 2007, NTV7 along with its sister channels, TV3, 8TV and TV9 made available for online viewing via Media Prima's newly-launched streaming service, Catch-Up TV, which later rebranded as Tonton. At the same time, NTV7 announced that it would spend RM40 million to strengthening its operation and gaining a stronger viewership by 2008.

In 2009, NTV7 recorded highest viewership rating from 800,000 up to 1 million viewers, mostly its Chinese viewers, per day. It also collaborated with the Branding Association of Malaysia to held the branding workshop called "Be Branded, Be Seen' to help the Small and Medium Enterprises (SME) to strengthening their brands through media.

In the third quarter of 2013, NTV7 recorded its viewership ratings through the two programmes aired – The Undercover and The Game 2.

=== Introduction of home shopping block (2016–2021) ===
On 1 April 2016, a teleshopping block bought by the Korean conglomerate CJ Group through subsidiary CJ E&M Co Ltd called CJ WOW Shop (now Wow Shop) was broadcasting across Media Prima channels. Several Media Prima channels (especially NTV7 and TV9) were more affected by the changes. It attracted public criticism on social media as a large part of the daytime schedule was replaced by the block, in which these slots had been previously dedicated to reruns, religious programming and kids programming.

On 1 November 2020, CJ Wow Shop was rebranded into Wow Shop after Media Prima bought the remaining 49% stake in the teleshopping network previously held by CJ Group.

=== Modern Malaysia era (2018) ===
From 5 March 2018, Media Prima attempted a new brand positioning for NTV7. The channel tried to target "Modern Malaysia" as a contemporary station through its new content line-up, including new Turkish Telenovelas; as well as its new slogan Feel It. The relaunch saw major changes as it became a dominated English-Malay language channel, with the channel name read as "n-t-v-tujuh" instead of "n-t-v-seven." Also, infomercial programming was reduced upon the channel's rebranding.

=== Chinese content reduction attempt ===
Upon the March 2018 rebranding, Chinese content on this channel was reduced to selected Chinese dramas from Hong Kong and China along with Mandarin news bulletins, with much of the remainder transferred to sister channel 8TV (which also attempted to reposition as Media Prima's sole all-Chinese channel on the same day). Originally, Mandarin 7 was supposed to be cancelled in May 2018 to complete its plan of moving all Chinese content to a single dedicated channel. However, when the 2018 General Election occurred, the bulletin became Malaysia's second-most watched after TV3's Buletin Utama (the said spot was formerly held by Berita TV9). Due to the Chinese community's positive response, Media Prima decided to reshuffle NTV7's news programming in June instead of axing Chinese news. In this format, only one news bulletin per language was aired on the channel with a single Mandarin newshour, while retaining half-hour editions in Malay and English.

=== Reverting to Chinese content (2018–2020) ===
The rebrand caused confusion among viewers, particularly Chinese communities who tuned in to NTV7 after finding out that most of its former programmes were moved to 8TV. Overall Chinese viewership was believed to be surprisingly lower.

As a result, on 31 December 2018, the former CEO of Media Prima Television Networks, Johan Ishak, said that the Mandarin variant of CJ Wow Shop would be broadcast on the channel and replace the Malay variant. The move was part of the company's restructuring NTV7 by axed English and Malay-language shows, dropped the channel nomenclature, moved some (including those from TV9) to the main TV3. It also brought back the channel's perception as a Chinese channel; yet the channel's Mandarin, Malay and English news bulletins remained unchanged.

Reruns of axed NTV7 shows were then aired on TV9 after the former's retreat while slogan "Feel it" was removed.

=== Mandarin 7 discontinuation (2020) ===
On 7 June 2020, Mandarin 7 aired its final edition and was merged into 8TV Mandarin News the following day. 8TV Mandarin News was also extended to one hour due to high ratings during the Movement Control Order (MCO) and COVID-19 pandemic in Malaysia.

=== Programming change, Ministry of Education collaboration and takeover (2020–present) ===
On 1 November 2020, CEO (now former) of Media Prima Television Networks, Dato' Khairul Anwar Salleh announced that NTV7 would be targeted for ages 15–28 by focusing on magazines, information and current affairs programs to meet the public needs, while Korean dramas would stop airing and all Chinese programmes have finally been integrated to 8TV. Korean variety show Running Man remains on this channel along with homeshopping block Wow Shop.

On 18 November 2020, DidikTV@ntv7, an educational programming block was introduced by Ministry of Education from 23 November 2020 until 16 January 2021. It formerly ran from 9 am to 12 pm every Monday to Friday. It was later split into two timeslots (9 am – 12 pm and 3 pm – 5 pm) on 27 January 2021, resulting the educational programming to be aired daily.

=== DidikTV KPM ===
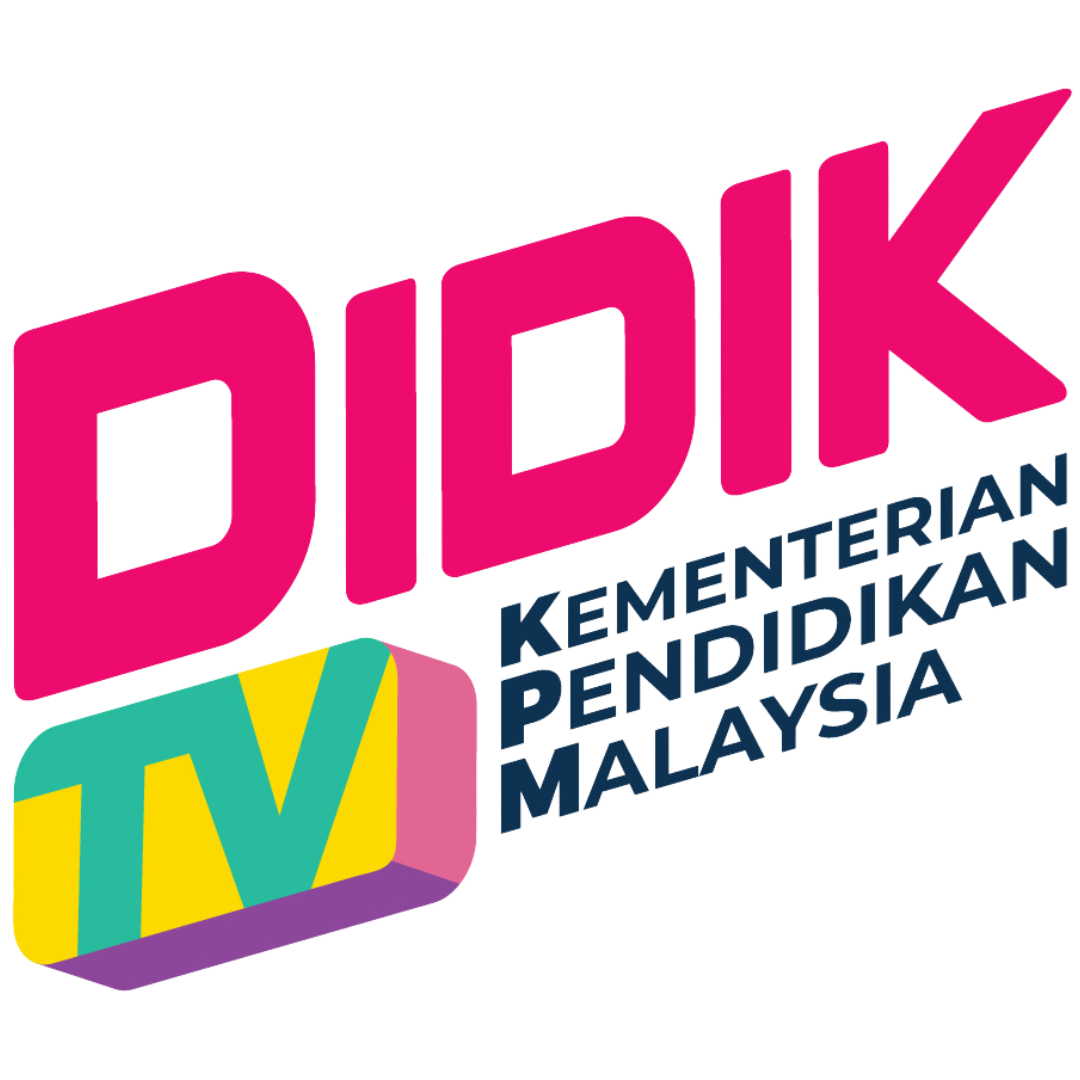
DidikTV KPM

On 12 February 2021, as the Ministry of Education will have a one-year term with Media Prima, it was announced that NTV7 will be rebranded through a takeover as a fully educational TV channel known as DidikTV KPM starting 17 February; the new channel will focus on educational content based on SPM curriculum and co-curriculum. It would also provide news focused on education, edutainment programs, and content produced by the students. The channel will have 17 hours of airtime and will run daily from 7 am to 12 am.

On 16 February 2021, Media Prima confirmed that ntv7 will not be defunct and its ownership remains unchanged, while the current team will be focusing on DidikTV KPM. Following the closure, many of longtime NTV7 viewers bid farewell to the channel on their respective social media accounts.

Since the DidikTV KPM launch, the main newscasts Edisi 7 was ceased entirely in replacement with Buletin Didik while 7 Edition moved to digital platforms; though it was later discontinued in May due to DidikTV KPM slot. Homeshopping block Wow Shop was ceased from airing on the channel. Soal Drama and Running Man were transferred to TV9 since 21 February 2021. Some of the original programming such as Trio On Point, Topik@7 (now Topik), Breakfast@9PM, Kail X and Jurnal Resipi will continue to air.

During the DidikTV@7 segment, the channel airs documentary, drama (weekends only), lifestyle, and cartoon programmes. Only certain programmes broadcast in Chinese language such as Let's Cycle (season 1) hosted by Rickman Chia and Baki Zainal.

From 15 to 30 September 2021, according to the viewership statistics from Media Prima Omnia, the viewership share for NTV7 has increased from 2% to 15%, making the channel become the second most-watched television station in Malaysia after TV3 (which the viewership share for TV3 is about 17%), together with TV9, which has the same viewership share of 15%.

Media Prima announced on 15 October 2024 that the news operations of all of its television networks, including NTV7 or DidikTV will began broadcast at the company's Balai Berita starting 21 October after more than two decades operated at Sri Pentas, Bandar Utama, Petaling Jaya, Selangor. On 12 March 2025, 15 days after the Sri Pentas building were closed, all of the company's TV networks logo, including NTV7, were removed from its former building.

== Logo history ==
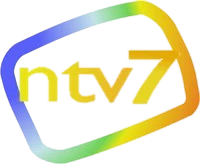
First logo of NTV7. (7 April 1998 - 2000)

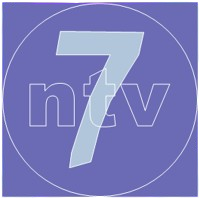
Second logo of NTV7. (2000 - 2001)

Fourth logo of NTV7, although the Circle 7 logo remains, the 'ntv' caption is removed and blue is replaced by purple in the logo. It was also used as an on screen bug until 15 August 2017 before it was replaced by the 2012 logo when it started broadcasting in 16:9. (2006 – 2012)

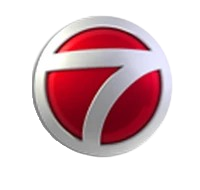
Fifth logo of NTV7, used primarily for broadcasting Chinese drama. (2012 - 2015)

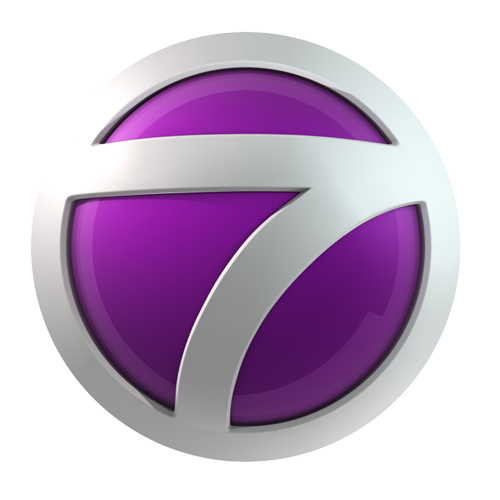
Sixth logo of NTV7. (16 August 2017 – 4 March 2018)

Seventh logo of NTV7. (4 March 2018 - 16 February 2021)

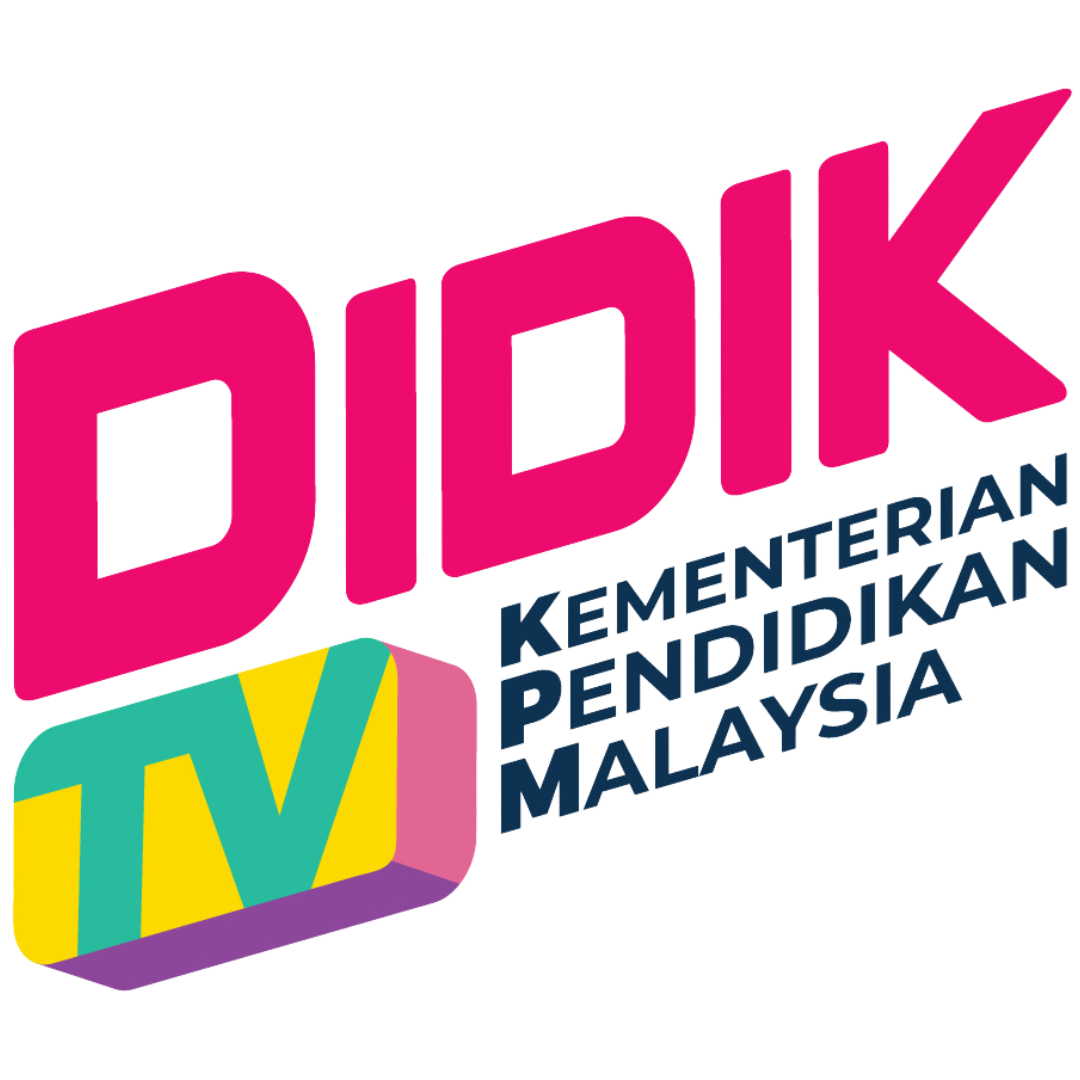
First logo of DidikTV KPM and Eighth logo of NTV7. (17 February 2021 - Present)

== Criticism and controversies ==
=== "Bangsa Asing" Remark ===
During the fourth episode of the "Who Wants to Be a Millionaire?" Malay Edition Game Show Programme aired on 8 June 2000, Host Jalaluddin Hassan was seen as remarking that he was amazed that a "Bangsa Asing" (Foreigner) was able to answer a question about a Malay movie, when a Malaysian Chinese named Eugene from Malacca became the only person out of the 10 contestant to pass the preliminary round by arranging P. Ramlee's movie sequence in the correct order. This incident sparked anger among its viewers especially some New Straits Times readers, who in their letters delivered to the newspaper company, said felt upset about the host's remark and that both the Television Company and the programme host should apologise. It drew concern from NTV7's chief executive officer Shazalli Ramly, who in a statement faxed to the New Straits Times on 19 June 2000, apologised to the viewers about the incident.

== See also ==
- List of television stations in Malaysia
- TV3
- TV9
- 8TV
- Circle 7 logo
- TV Pendidikan
