= PRIMEtime =

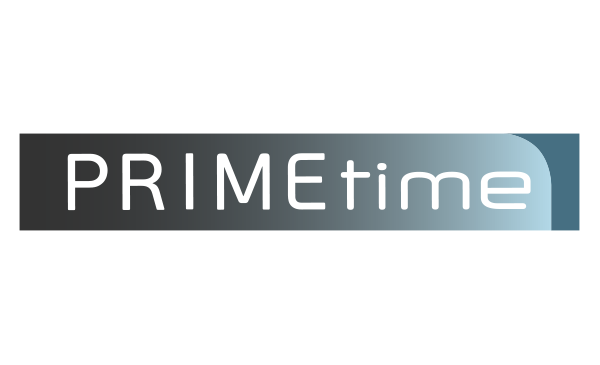
- Country: Malaysia
- Headquarters: Bukit Jalil, Kuala Lumpur, Malaysia

Programming
- Language: English
- Picture format: 16:9 HDTV (1080i)

Ownership
- Owner: Astro, Measat Broadcast Network Systems

History
- Launched: 15 September 2021; 5 years ago
- Replaced: Hello HD; Kix
- Closed: 4 September 2023; 3 years ago
- Replaced by: Showcase (now Astro Showcase)

Primetime (stylised as PRIMEtime) was a 24-hour English-language pay television channel in Malaysia owned by Astro. The channel aired general entertainment programmes with content primarily on canned shows from the United States.

Alongside its sister channels Showcase Movies, BOO, EGG Network and TA-DAA!, it made its official launch on 15 September 2021 in response to the closure of the Disney/Fox channels in Southeast Asian region on 1 October 2021 which replaced Kix which ceased broadcasting on 1 July 2022.

Primetime ceased broadcasting on 4 September 2023 together with Astro Xiao Tai Yang (merged with Astro AEC and On Demand) and Astro Tutor TV SK (now Astro Tutor TV) and shows from this channel were aired on Showcase (now Astro Showcase; must have "Movies" pack before watching).

== Programming ==
The channel has a line-up of programmes primarily from Paramount Global Distribution Group, Sony Pictures Television and NBCUniversal, in addition to locally-produced English programmes and from Astro's Go Shop block.

=== Final Programs ===
- Evil
- Magnum P.I.
- Chicago Fire
- Chicago P.D.
- Chicago Med
- Chucky
- Young Rock
- Law & Order: Special Victims Unit
- Rachael Ray
- Transplant
- Private Eyes
- Survivor
- Nazli
- Magnificent Century
- Celebrity Wheel of Fortune
- Burden of Truth
- Nancy Drew
- Mary Kills People

=== Former Programs ===
- Tell Me a Story
- Four Weddings and a Funeral
- The Magicians
- A Discovery of Witches
- Punky Brewster
- Ordinary Joe
- S.W.A.T. (Moved to AXN Asia)
- Kids Say the Darnest Things
- The Affair
- Saved by the Bell
- The Game: Towards Zero
- What in The Malaysia?
- Travel For Love
- Star Vs Food Malaysia
- Best.Ever
- Who Wants to Be a Millionaire (Revival 2020)
- Keeping Up with the Kardashians
- Why Women Kill
- The Royals Revealed
- The Night Shift
- Girls5eva
- Into The Dark
- Riviera

=== Astro Originals ===
- Kuasa (Drama)
- Histeria The Series
- Murder By Moonlight
- One Cent Thief (Also aired on Astro Ria, Astro Vinmeen HD & Astro Shuang Xing)
- Kudeta (Also aired on Astro Ria)
