= Vision Four =

VIV (Vision Four)
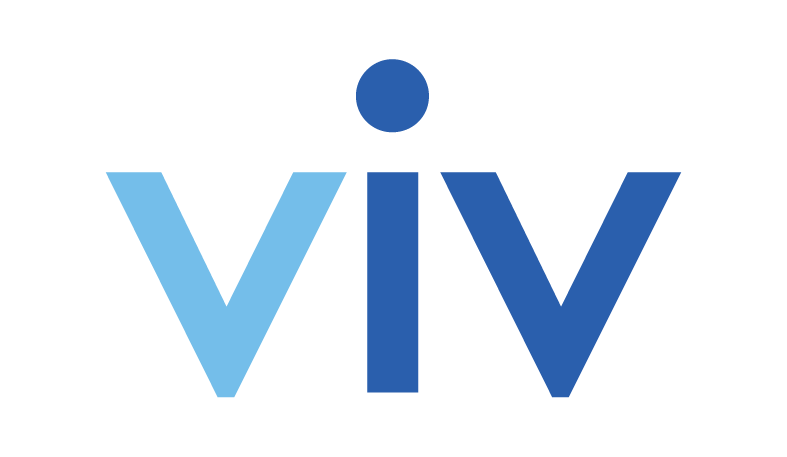
- Current logo, used since 1 April 2025
- Country: Malaysia
- Broadcast area: Malaysia, Singapore, Indonesia (Batam, Riau Islands) and Thailand (South Thailand)
- Headquarters: 28 Jalan Liku, Bangsar, 59100 Kuala Lumpur, Malaysia

Ownership
- Owner: VIV Media Group

History
- Launched: November 6, 1982 (as Vision Four); April 1, 2025 (as VIV)
- Founder: Dato Steven Harold Day and Datin Su Wai Fun
- Closed: April 1, 2025 (as Vision Four)
- Former names: Vision Four (November 2, 1982 – April 1, 2025)

Links
- Website: viv.my

VIV, formerly known as Vision Four, is a Malaysian media company established in 1982. It is recognised as Asia's first hotel television network. Headquartered in Bangsar, Kuala Lumpur, the company operates VIV (formerly known as Vision Four TV), which delivers in-room entertainment to hotel rooms across Malaysia and Singapore.

The network offers diverse English-language content, including Hollywood films, documentaries, and lifestyle programs from broadcasters like BBC Earth, Discovery, and National Geographic.

== Other ventures ==
Beyond television services, Vision Four Media Group has expanded its operations to encompass various media and event-related ventures. These include Vision KL, a city magazine; AsiaReach Publishing, which handles contract publishing; and AsiaReach Events, known for organising events such as the Malaysia International Gastronomy Festival (MIGF).

The company is also involved in digital media through Vision Four Multimedia, offering services like IPTV, digital content production, and internet services. Additionally, VIV Tech provides MATV and engineering services, supporting the technical infrastructure of its media operations.

== Awards and recognition ==
MIGF had won the Pacific Asia Travel Association (PATA) Gold Awards in Marketing twice, first in 2007 and later in 2019.

== Rebrand ==
From 1 April 2025, Vision Four TV channels were rebranded to VIV, offering enhanced movies, documentaries, Asian programming, and elective news channels. VIV stands for the letter V and the number 4 in Roman numerals.

== Logo history ==
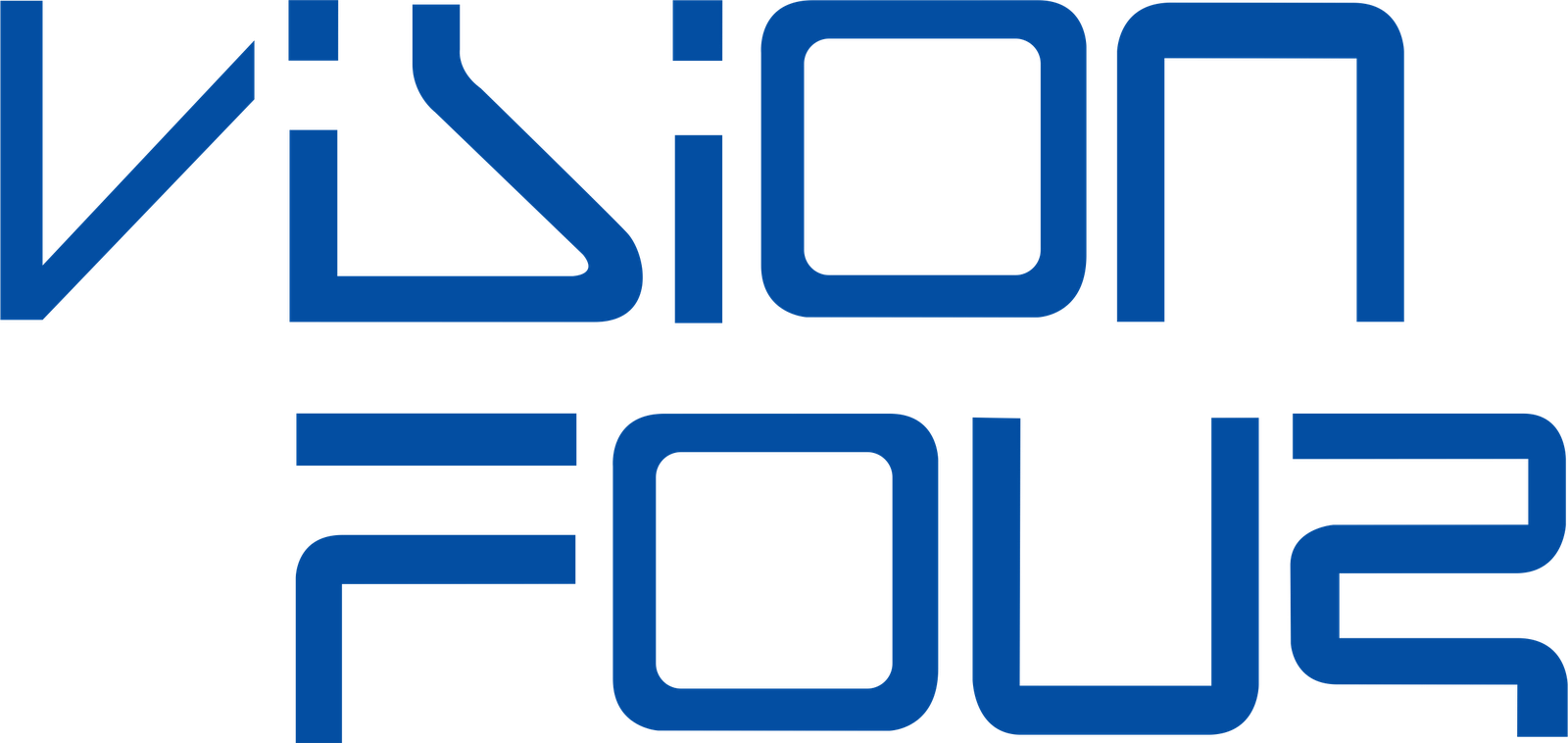
Vision Four logo (2010's-April 2025)

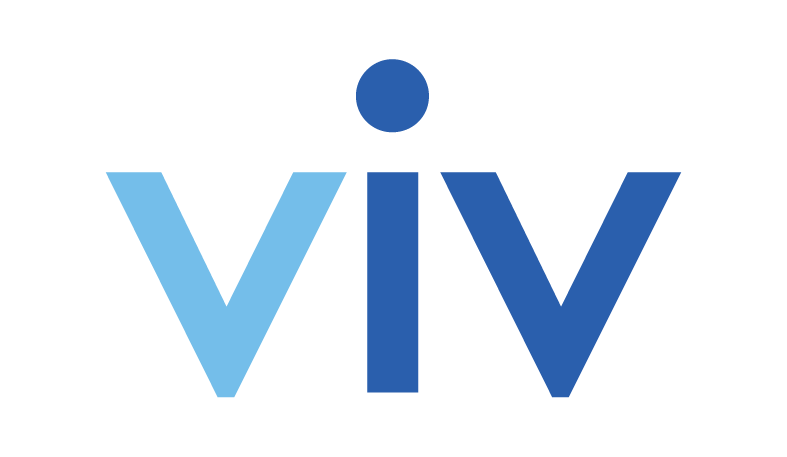
VIV logo (April 2025 – Present)

== Short-lived ban ==
In the 90s, there was a general ban on video screening of the in-house TV in hotels. However, it was short-lived when the government decided to review the ban a few days later. A few months after the ban revision, Vision Four and the Ministry of Tourism launched a video series promoting the country's attractions.

== Legal ==
On 5 May 2023, a former Vision Four employee, Sherlyn Teo Kia Lim, pleaded guilty and was convicted on three charges under Section 3(1)(b) of the Computer Crimes Act 1997 in the Kuala Lumpur Session Court. She was fined for unauthorised transfer of Vision Four data to poach its customers.
