= Melewar Industrial Group =

Melewar Industrial Group Berhad
- Formerly: Maruichi Malaysia Steel Tube Berhad
- Company type: Public limited company
- Traded as: MYX: 3778
- ISIN: MYL3778OO007
- Industry: Steel, Energy & Engineering
- Founded: 1972; 54 years ago
- Headquarters: 15th Floor, No 566 Jalan Ipoh, Kuala Lumpur, Malaysia
- Key people: Tunku Ya’acob Tunku Abdullah, Executive Chairman
- Revenue: ▲MYR 752.2 million (2022)
- Operating income: ▲MYR 60.9 million (2022)
- Net income: ▼MYR 35.0 million (2022)
- Total assets: ▲MYR 889.0 million (2022)
- Number of employees: 461 (2018)
- Subsidiaries: Mycron Steel Berhad; Ausgard Quick Assembly Systems Sdn. Bhd.; Melewar Imperial Limited; 3Bumi Sdn. Bhd.; Melewar Steel Mills Sdn. Bhd.; Melewar Steel Services Sdn. Bhd.; Melewar Steel Assets Sdn. Bhd.
- Website: www.melewar-mig.com

Melewar Industrial Group Berhad (MYX: 3778) is a manufacturing company in Malaysia. It is owned by the family of its late founder and chairman Tunku Tan Sri Abdullah ibni Almarhum Tuanku Abdul Rahman from the Negeri Sembilan royal family and engages in the manufacturing and trade of steel products in addition to investments. It has 461 employees and is listed on the Kuala Lumpur Stock Exchange. Presently Melewar Industrial Group Berhad has an installed capacity of more than 22,000 m/tons per month with the ability to manufacture pipes from 10 mm to 355 mm O.D. MIG's products are widely used in the construction, furniture, automotive, bicycle, and engineering industries.

== Business activities ==
MIG has three core business divisions;

- Iron and steel
- Energy
- Engineering

=== List of companies ===
Melewar Industrial Group Berhad group structure is shown below.

Iron and steel

- Mycron Steel Berhad (MYX: 5087) -Investment Holding Main Market Listed
  - Mycron Steel CRC Sdn. Bhd. – Manufacturer of Cold Rolled Coil (“CRC”) Steel Sheets
    - Silver Victory Sdn. Bhd. - Trading of Steel Related Products
  - Melewar Steel Tube Sdn. Bhd. – Manufacturer of Steel Tubes
- Melewar Steel Mills Sdn. Bhd. – Manufacturer/Trader of Steel Rebar, Billets and Scrap
- Melewar Imperial Limited -Investment Holding
  - Jack Nathan Limited - Trading of Building Tools and Materials
  - Melewar Steel UK Limited - Distribution of Steel Tube in the United Kingdom
- Ausgard Quick Assembly Systems Sdn. Bhd. - Steel Based Quick Assembly Homes Manufacturing
  - Melbina Builders Limited - Steel Based Quick Assembly Homes Marketing

Others

- Melewar Ecology Sdn. Bhd. - Dormant
- Melewar Steel Services Sdn. Bhd. -Property Investment
- Melewar Steel Assets Sdn. Bhd. - Investment Holding
- Melewar Steel Engineering Sdn. Bhd. - Investment Holding - Power
  - Mperial Power Limited - Investment Holding - Power
    - Siam Power Phase 2 Co., Ltd. - Power Generation

Engineering

- Melewar Integrated Engineering Sdn. Bhd. - Engineering
  - Melewar MycroSmelt Technology Limited - Smelting / Billet Making Technology Owner
