= Unifi Sports =

Malaysian sports pay television network

unifi Sports
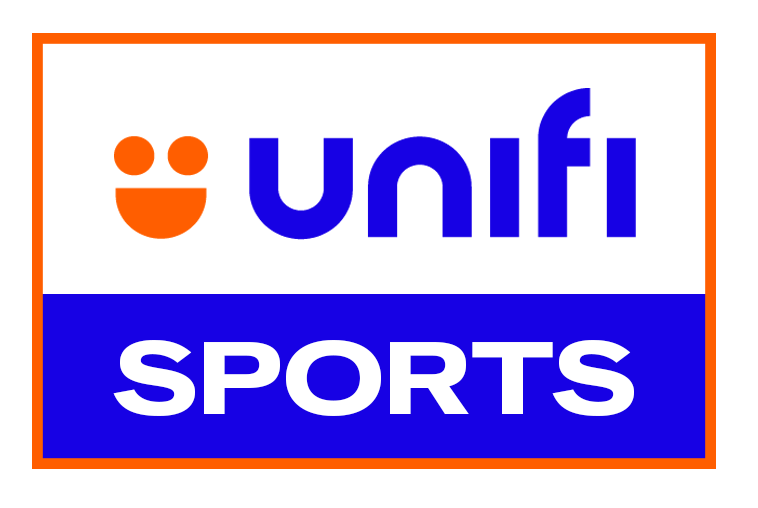
- Country: Malaysia
- Broadcast area: Malaysia

Programming
- Languages: English; Malay
- Picture format: 16:9 (HDTV)

Ownership
- Owner: Telekom Malaysia Berhad
- Sister channels: DEGUP; Dunia Sinema; Inspirasi; Salam HD; Sensasi; Unifi eSports

History
- Launched: September 15, 2012 (as HyppSports HD); February 28, 2020 (as unifi Sports); September 30, 2024 (unifi eSports)
- Closed: January 1, 2019 (as HyppSports HD); September 1, 2022 (Unifi Sports 5); February 1, 2023 (Unifi Sports 2 - 4 only)
- Former names: HyppSports 1 & 2 HD (2012–2018); HyppSports 3 HD (2012–2019); HyppSports 4 HD (2012–2017)

Links
- Website: https://unifi.com.my/tv

Availability

Streaming media
- unifi playTV: Watch live (Malaysia only)

unifi Sports (formerly HyppSports HD) is an in-house subscription IPTV network in Malaysia dedicated to broadcasting sports-related content 24 hours a day. It is available exclusively on unifi TV.

== History ==
Launched in 2012 as one of unifi TV original channels, HyppSports Illustrated HD (a joint-venture between unifi TV and Sports Illustrated Asia) offers a sports of international sporting events such as football, badminton, motorsport, rugby, volleyball and golf. unifi TV also operates two sister channels, HyppSports Illustrated 2 HD and HyppSports 3 HD on channels 702 & 703 respectively, along with a high definition simulcast of all channels.

The network was eventually closed in 2019 but after TM regain broadcasting rights of the top Malaysian football competitions/tournaments, a year later, unifi TV relaunch the sports network with its new name, unifi Sports.

== Current rights ==
=== Soccer ===
- FIFA World Cup
- I League (licensed from Vidio)
  - Indonesia Super League
  - Indonesia Championship Division

=== Mixed martial arts ===
- Ultimate Fighting Championship
- BYON Combat (licensed from Vidio)

=== Former rights ===
==== Soccer ====
- FAM (until 2022)
  - Malaysia FA Cup
- MFL
  - Malaysia Cup
  - Malaysia Super League
  - Piala Sumbangsih
  - Malaysia Premier League (until 2022)

==== Motorsports ====
- Malaysia Superbike Championship
- Malaysia Speed Festival
  - MSF SuperMoto
  - MSF SuperTurismo (until 2022)
