= Channel W =

Malaysian television channel

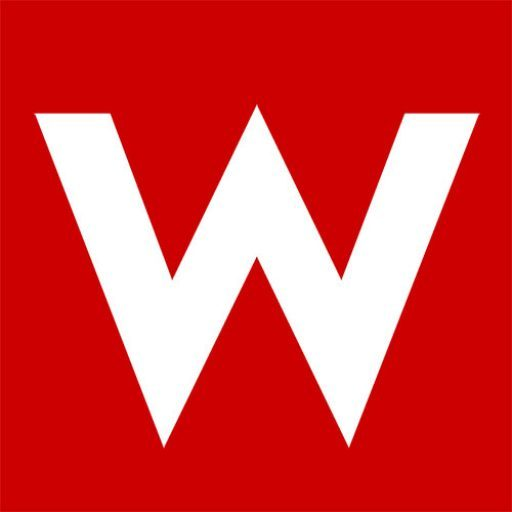
- Country: Malaysia
- Broadcast area: Malaysia; Singapore; Brunei; Thailand (Southern Thailand); Indonesia (Kalimantan) and (Riau) via DVB-T2
- Headquarters: Damansara Perdana, Petaling Jaya, Selangor

Programming
- Picture format: 16:9 576i SDTV

Ownership
- Owner: Online Dynamics (M) Sdn. Bhd.

History
- Launched: 29 March 2012; 14 years ago
- Closed: 1 April 2019; 7 years ago
- Replaced by: TVS (MYTV channel space)
- Former names: Capital TV

Links
- Website: channelw.my

Channel W was a Malaysian television channel broadcasting news, business matters, entertainment, and interviews, owned by Online Dynamics (M) Sdn Bhd, a Bumiputra-owned media company. The W in the channel name stands for Warta (gazette in English), referring to the newspaper Warta, also owned by Online Dynamics.

As Capital TV, the channel primarily broadcast in English, but over time, the channel began to gradually add more Malay-language programmes. Capital TV changed its name to Channel W on 3 January 2018. Channel W ceased broadcasting on 1 April 2019. It was replaced by TVS which taking over its formerly used channel space on MYTV on 6 February 2021.

== History ==
The channel began as Capital TV, broadcasting exclusively on Hypp TV in high definition on Channel 127. Touted as "Malaysia's first local business channel", the channel began broadcasting on 1 December 2011 and launched on 29 March 2012. Its first editor-in-chief was Pravin Kumar, who formerly worked with the national news agency Bernama.

In May 2014, Capital TV signed an agreement with Aylezo Sdn Bhd to produce motorsport-related content, specifically for "Team FXPrimus Aylezo’s participation in the 2014 Lamborghini Blancpain Super Trofeo Asia Season", which would only air in 2015.

In September 2014, Capital TV aired the reality TV programme Bake & Sell, dubbed as "the first local cookery and entrepreneurship show" inspired by similar programmes such as The Great British Bake Off and The Apprentice.

In August 2015, Capital TV produced and aired Jejak Jeneral, a 13-episode documentary series on the members of the Malaysian Armed Forces.

In 2016, Capital TV in collaboration with Radio Televisyen Malaysia and Universiti Putra Malaysia (UPM) produced the 15-episode talk show Persoalannya, where two panelists from UPM and two other panelists discuss on various current issues.

On 3 January 2018, Capital TV became Channel W, ditching its initial business format for news and current issues presented casually. As part of its name change, the Capital TV channel stopped updating and redirected to the Channel W website.
