= Astro Vellithirai =

Malaysian television channel

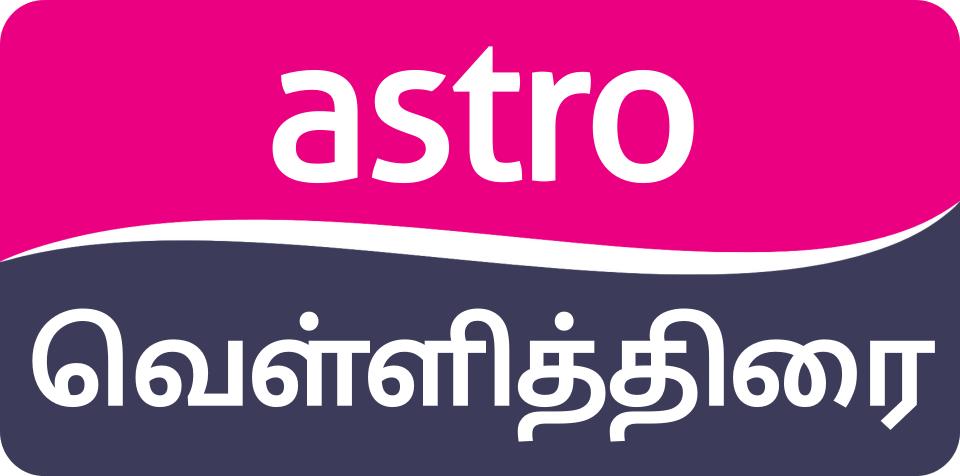
- Country: Malaysia
- Broadcast area: Malaysia

Programming
- Language: Tamil
- Picture format: 16:9 HDTV (1080i)

Ownership
- Owner: Astro Malaysia Holdings
- Parent: Measat Broadcast Network Systems Sdn. Bhd. (Astro)
- Sister channels: Astro Vaanavil; Astro Vinmeen; Astro Thangathirai

History
- Launched: 16 April 2007 (SD) (Malaysia); 14 April 2022 (HD) (Malaysia)
- Founder: Ananda Krishnan
- Closed: 1 July 2020 (Singapore); 14 April 2022 (SD) (Malaysia)

Astro Vellithirai is a 24-hour Tamil language movie channel and also known as the Tamil version of the Asian HBO, showing the local and Kollywood movies. The channel began its broadcast on 16 April 2007 on channel 74, and moved to channel 202 on 1 October of the same year due to channel renumbering. Most of the movies are available in Malay and English subtitles.

The channel is available for all Astro and NJOI customers.
