= Astro Ceria =

Malaysian television channel

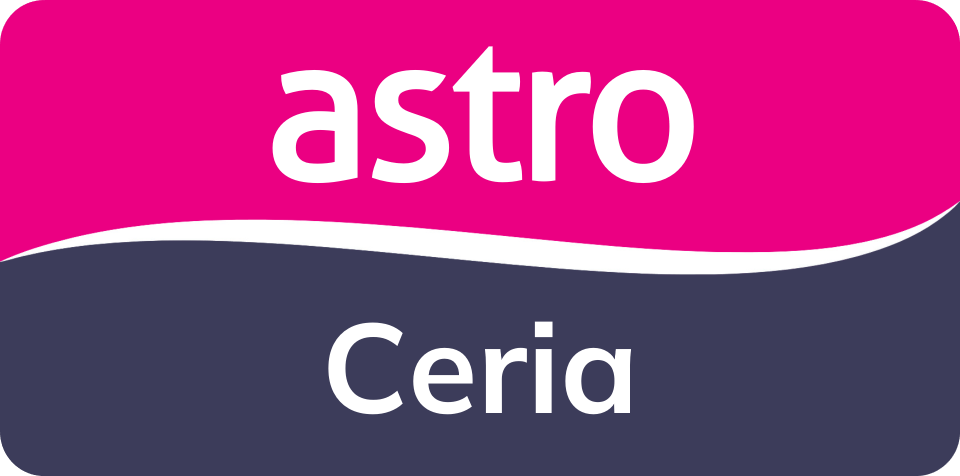
- Country: Malaysia
- Broadcast area: Malaysia
- Headquarters: Kuala Lumpur, Malaysia

Programming
- Languages: Malay; English
- Picture format: 16:9 HDTV (1080i)

Ownership
- Owner: Astro
- Sister channels: Astro Tutor TV

History
- Launched: 2 May 2006 (Indonesia); 31 August 2006 (Malaysia, SD); 22 November 2019 (HD)
- Founder: Ananda Krishnan
- Replaced: Astro TVIQ
- Closed: 20 October 2008 (Indonesia); 12 April 2021 (SD) (Astro & NJOI); 1 April 2022 (HD) (Kristal-Astro)

Links
- Website: www.astro.com.my/ceria

Astro Ceria is a 24-hour Malay-language television channel that is broadcast on the Astro satellite television service. This channel is dedicated to toddlers and children. It was launched on 31 August 2006, making it Malaysia's first-ever television channel dedicated to kids.

Some of Astro Ceria's programmes are taken from various countries that broadcast their cartoons in English, Malay, Indonesian, Korean, Japanese and Mandarin. Astro Ceria's lineup also consists of in-house programmes produced by Astro. Viewers can watch the cartoons on Astro Ceria in six languages; in Malay, which is the default language for all the shows on Astro Ceria, or in the original broadcast language unless the show was originally produced in July 2020 Malay. Subtitles are available in Astro Ceria at this time.

Astro Ceria has organised several activities for children of all ages to increase its popularity. A Run for Fun marathon was started in 2008 and is held between February and April. Berani Jadi Bos?, a competition searching for children who can portray a boss's role, was held in 2007. In 2009, it also organised a creative fun carnival, Sukaria Ceria, where kids created outstanding outfits using all-natural resources.

Astro Ceria is currently available for free-to-view on Astro customers and paid-per-view on NJOI customers in Malaysia on Channel 611.

Since 22 November 2019, Astro Ceria HD started broadcasting on channel number 631 and joined Astro Xiao Tai Yang HD on channel number 304. Astro Ceria has a new program in collaboration with Pinkfong (originally from South Korea) titled "Hello Pinkfong!".

On 20 August 2023 (after until 19 November 2024), Astro Ceria was rebranded with new branding, and new shows were added.

== Logo history ==
Astro Ceria HD logo (22 November 2019 – 19 November 2024)

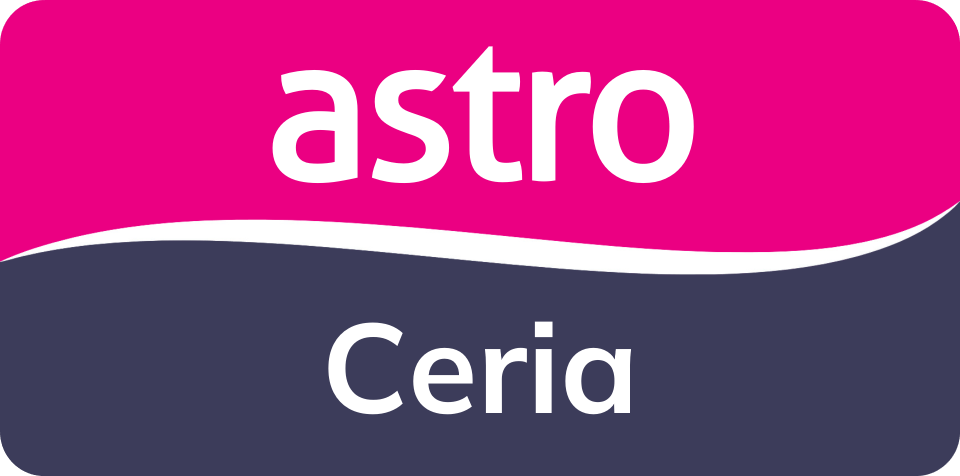
Astro Ceria logo (20 November 2024 - present)

== See also ==
- List of Malaysian television stations
- List of programmes broadcast by Astro Ceria
