= Tara HD =

Malaysian Hindi-language television channel

- Country: Malaysia
- Broadcast area: Malaysia; Brunei
- Headquarters: Kuala Lumpur, Malaysia

Programming
- Languages: Hindi; English
- Picture format: 1080i HDTV

Ownership
- Owner: Astro Malaysia Holdings Sdn. Bhd.

History
- Launched: 19 October 2016
- Replaced: Zee Variasi
- Closed: 1 October 2019

Tara HD was a Malaysian Hindi-language pay-television channel, owned by satellite provider Astro.

It offered Bollywood movies and Indian-made programming, including television productions from Colors TV, StarPlus, Life OK, Sony Entertainment Television, Colors Infinity, Star World, FYI TV18, Zoom, NDTV Good Times, Food Food TV, Big Magic, MTV India, Living Foodz and Zee TV.

Viewers were able to watch a variety of shows with English and Tamil subtitles.

The channel was launched on 19 October 2016, replacing Zee Variasi, and broadcast movies and programs with optional Malay and English subtitles. The channel ended its broadcast on 1 October 2019 and was replaced by Colors HD on the same channel number.

After Tara HD's closure, selected serials such as Shakti and discontinued shows (such as Court Room - Sachchai Hazir Ho and Madhubala - Ek Ishq Ek Junoon) from Colors Hindi continued on new channel Colors HD. Tujhse Hai Raabta, Ye Hai Mohabbatein, Kasautii Zindagii Kay, Crime Patrol Dial 100, Nazar, Qayamat Ki Raat and pre-Tara HD original shows moved to a sister channel, Astro Bollyone HD.
