= Sports Illustrated Television (Asia) =

Asian television channel

Sports Illustrated
- Broadcast area: Asiawide

Programming
- Language(s): English
- Picture format: 4:3/16:9 576i (SDTV); 16:9 1080i (HDTV)

Ownership
- Owner: ASN Limited; Meredith Corporation (Sports Illustrated)

History
- Launched: October 1, 2009; 15 years ago
- Closed: May 1, 2019; 5 years ago (Hong Kong, Indonesia and Malaysia); June 21, 2019; 5 years ago (Singapore and Thailand)
- Former names: All Sports Network (2009-2016)

Links
- Website: https://www.si.com/asia/tv-schedule

Sports Illustrated TV was the first 24-hour sports network in Asia. It was launched on October 1, 2009 by Yes Television. The channel was then relaunched in 2016 by the newly formed joint-venture between ASN Ltd. and Meredith Corporation (owners of the Sports Illustrated magazine).

Sports Illustrated TV featured a wide range of sports content from the world's biggest brands in american sports. It managed 3,200 hours of licensed sports content including NFL (including the Super Bowl), NHL, NCAA March Madness, NASCAR and Extreme Sports. It also had exclusive game rights to certain NCAA football, NCAA basketball and other major collegiate events.

Sports Illustrated reaches 11 territories – Cambodia, Laos, India, Indonesia, Macau, Malaysia, Myanmar, Taiwan, Thailand, Singapore and Sri Lanka.

As of 2018, the channel was no longer available in Hong Kong and Philippines.

It was announced on May 1, 2019, that Sports Illustrated TV would cease its transmission at the end of the following day in the rest of Asia. On June 21, 2019, it was no longer be available in Singapore and Thailand.

== Final Programming Broadcast by Sports Illustrated TV ==
- NHL
- NHL Tonight
- NCAA Football & Basketball
- National Lacrosse League
- Better Than Four
- Dream Car Garage
- Epic TV
- NASCAR Xfinity Series (Races & Highlights)
- NASCAR Camping World Truck Series (Races & Highlights)
- NASCAR Whelen Euro Series (Races & Highlights) (2016 onwards)
- NFL
- NFL Total Access
- NFL GameDay
- Super Bowl

NFL programming get excluded in Thailand (True Visions), Hong Kong (Now TV) and Taiwan (Sportcast)

- SI Now
- SI Fansided
