= Astro Vaanavil =

Tamil channel in Malaysia

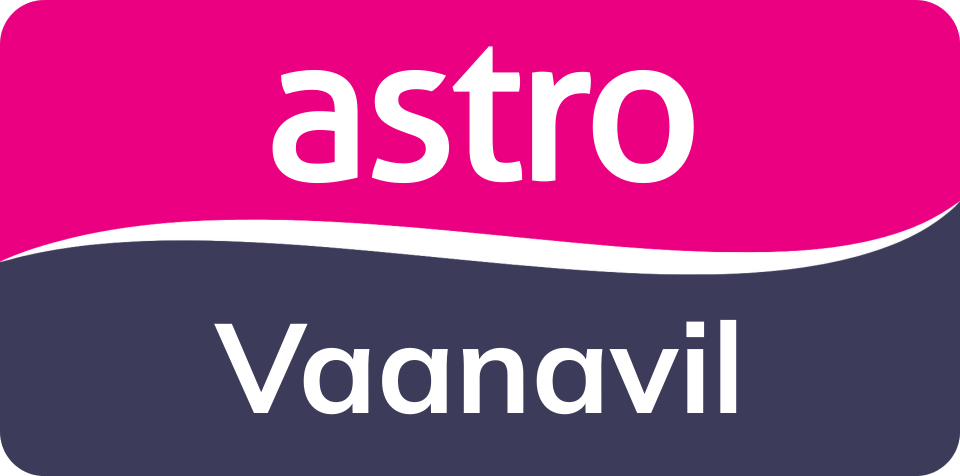
- Current logo, used since 2024.
- Country: Malaysia
- Broadcast area: Malaysia

Programming
- Languages: Tamil; Telugu; Malayalam; Punjabi
- Picture format: 16:9 HDTV (1080i)

Ownership
- Owner: Astro Malaysia Holdings
- Parent: Measat Broadcast Network Systems Sdn. Bhd. (Astro); Doordarshan
- Sister channels: Astro Vinmeen; Astro Vellithirai; Astro Thangathirai

History
- Launched: 1 June 1996; 30 years ago (SD); 1 June 2020; 6 years ago (HD)
- Founder: Ananda Krishnan
- Closed: 31 May 2020; 6 years ago (SD, Astro only)

Links
- Website: astroulagam.com.my

Astro Vaanavil (lit. 'rainbow') is a Malaysian pay television channel that broadcasts programming in Tamil, targeting the Indian community in Malaysia. It was launched on 1 June 1996. It was created by Astro. Starting 1 June 2020, Astro Vaanavil has been officially upgraded to SD/HD and is known as Astro Vaanavil HD.

It is the dominant local channel targeted at the Indian community in Malaysia. Besides from broadcasting in Tamil, there are also programs in Telugu, Malayalam & even to a lesser extent, Punjabi.

== Programmes ==
All programmes on Astro Vaanavil were dubbed in Malaysian Tamil with Malay subtitles, and contain sexual content, mild violence and adult language, which may be unsuitable for children to watch Playboy TV's Tamil-dubbed programmes, especially on Astro's electronic programme guide (EPG), but with all channel listings of all genres.
