= Astro NJOI =

Malaysian television service

- Type: Private satellite and digital television
- Headquarters: Astro Productions Sdn. Bhd., All Asia Broadcast Centre, Technology Park Malaysia, Bukit Jalil, 57000, Kuala Lumpur, Malaysia
- Area served: Malaysia
- Products: • Prepaid direct broadcast satellite • Digital television broadcasting
- Owner: Ministry of Communications (Malaysia)
- Parent: Astro Malaysia Holdings Berhad
- Website: www.njoi.com.my

Astro NJOI (stylised as NJOI) is a Malaysian free-to-view satellite and digital television service launched on 18 February 2012 in collaboration with the government of Malaysia and Astro. It was officially announced by Malaysia's sixth Prime Minister, Najib Razak, on 20 December 2011. At launch, the service offered 18 television channels and 19 radio stations. Existing Astro customers may also purchase this service through a separate account. NJOI is targeted at the rural and the lower household communities in Malaysia.

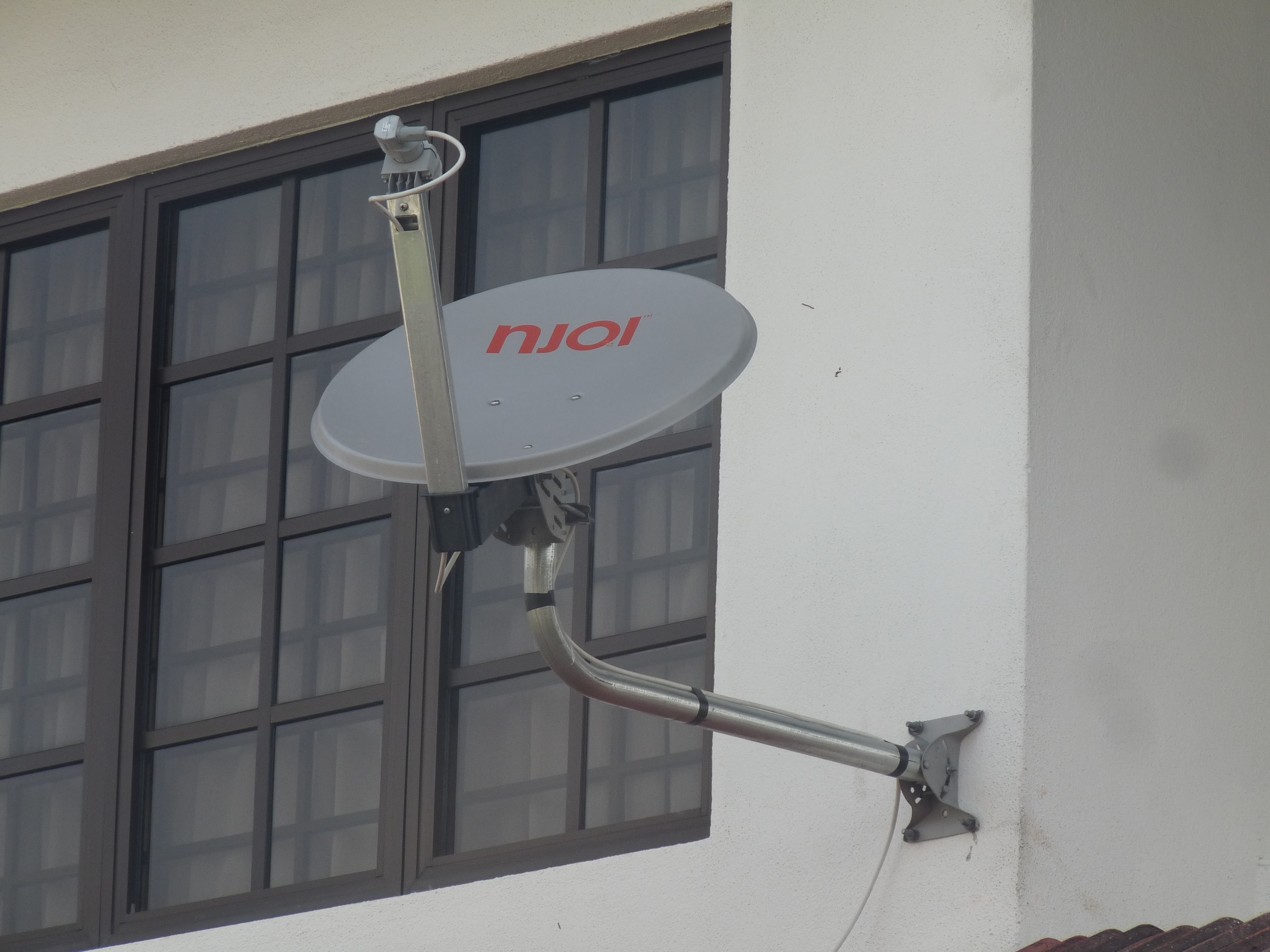
An NJOI satellite dish, similar to Astro's.

At launch, the setup, which included a set-top box, outdoor unit (ODU) satellite dish, smartcard, and remote control unit, was available for a one-time payment of RM 305 at all Astro-authorised retailers, with a standard installation fee of RM 100 from an Astro-authorised installer. In mid-2013, the one-time payment was reduced to RM 280, while the installation fee remained RM 100. The platform operates on a prepaid card system, allowing users to pay for the day and the number of prepaid channels they wish to watch. The decoder's HDMI output is initially locked, providing users with only composite signal and component video outputs. However, some decoders with updated firmware are able to use the HDMI output. In July 2012, the service started offering prepaid channels.

NJOI launched its first HD channel, channel 300 (Xi Yue HD), on 1 February 2015.

In 2016, the recommended retail price was set at RM 285 (inclusive of GST). From 1 February 2017, the price for a new setup was RM 350 (excluding RM 100 installation). On 1 October 2017, the total price was increased to RM 355. NJOI's main competitor is Sirius TV, which launched in Q4 2019. Its digital terrestrial antenna-based DTT competitor is myFreeview, which was launched in 2019.

On 28 April 2021, When Astro launched their new NJOI HD subscription-based package for NJOI customers, the HD version of Astro Prima, Astro Oasis, Astro Vaanavil, Astro Xiao Tai Yang, Astro AEC, CCTV-4, Astro Awani, Hello HD, eGG Network HD and Astro Arena can only be enabled via the HD Pack while retaining the SD versions of these channels, which were reassigned to different channel numbers.

== See also ==
- Television in Malaysia
- Digital television in Malaysia
