= Astro Xiao Tai Yang =

Malaysian video-on-demand channel

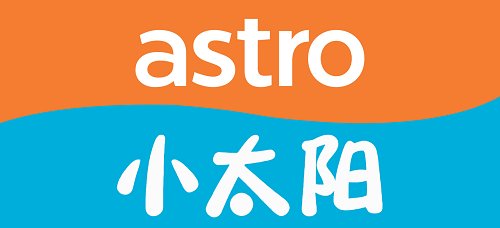
- Country: Malaysia
- Broadcast area: Malaysia
- Headquarters: Kuala Lumpur, Malaysia

Programming
- Language: Mandarin
- Picture format: 16:9 HDTV (1080i)

Ownership
- Owner: Astro
- Sister channels: Astro Ceria; Astro Tutor TV

History
- Launched: 13 October 2007; 18 years ago (SD); 22 November 2019; 6 years ago (HD)
- Closed: 15 March 2021; 4 years ago (Astro) (SD); 31 March 2022; 3 years ago (Kristal-Astro) (HD); 4 September 2023; 2 years ago (HD)
- Replaced by: Astro AEC

Links
- Website: xuan.com.my/channels/xty

Astro Xiao Tai Yang (simplified Chinese: Astro 小太阳; traditional Chinese: Astro 小太陽; English: Astro the Little Sun, Astro Little Sun, Astro Tiny Sun or Astro Small Sun or simplified as Astro XTY) is a video-on-demand channel (formerly from a 24-hour television channel) targeting Mandarin-speaking children aged 4–12 years old, providing educational and entertainment programmes. The channel line up consists of preschool learning, animation, music, science and arts.

== Logos ==
Previous logo.
