= List of VV Drama dramas in 2013 =

This is a list of television serial dramas broadcast by VV Drama in 2013. Variety shows and encore timeslots will not be shown on this list.

== Hong Kong ==
=== 8.00pm TVB series ===
These dramas air in Singapore from 8:00pm to 9:00pm, Monday to Friday on VV Drama.

| Broadcast | English title (Chinese title) | Eps. | Cast and crew | Theme song(s) | Genre | Notes | Official website |
|---|---|---|---|---|---|---|---|
| 27 Dec 2012– 24 Jan | No Good Either Way 衝呀！瘦薪兵團 (PG) | 21 | Amy Wong (producer); Ruco Chan, Kristal Tin, Louis Yuen, Gill Mohindepaul Singh, Natalie Tong, Jason Chan, Stephen Au, Florence Kwok | "瘦薪族" (Louis Yuen, Ruco Chan, Gill Mohindepaul Singh) | Comedy drama | | Official website |
| 25 Jan– 21 Feb | Witness Insecurity 護花危情 (PG13 Violence) | 20 | Lau Kar-ho (producer); Linda Chung, Bosco Wong, Paul Chun, Ram Chiang, Cilla Kung, Ronald Law, Queenie Chu | "最幸福的事" (Linda Chung) | Action drama, romance | | Official website |
| 22 Feb– 25 Mar | Divas in Distress 巴不得媽媽... (PG) | 22 | Poon Ka-tak (producer); Liza Wang, Gigi Wong, Chin Kar-lok, Him Law, Mandy Wong, Eliza Sam, Chung King-fai | "能否愛遇上" (Edmond Leung) | Comedy drama | | Official website |
| 26 Mar– 20 May | Silver Spoon, Sterling Shackles 名媛望族 (PG) | 40 | Chong Wai-kin (producer); Damian Lau, Idy Chan, Tavia Yeung, Kenneth Ma, Ron Ng, Rebecca Zhu, Elena Kong, Mary Hon, JJ Jia, Vincent Wong, Sire Ma, Shek Sau, Ben Wong | Opening: "此時此刻" (Fiona Sit); Ending: "有時" (Ron Ng) | Period drama | TVB 45th Anniversary Drama | Official website |
| 21 May – 17 Jun | Missing You 幸福摩天輪 (PG13 Mature Themes) | 20 | Fong Chun-chiu (producer); Linda Chung, Jason Chan, Lin Xiawei, Ram Chiang, Cilla Kung, Calvin Chan | "幸福歌" (Linda Chung) | Drama | | Official website |
| 18 Jun– 15 Jul | Season of Love 戀愛季節 (PG) | 20 | Kwan Wing-chung (producer); Kenneth Ma, Myolie Wu, Ron Ng, Kate Tsui, Nancy Wu, Vincent Wong, Oscar Leung, Him Law, Toby Leung, JJ Jia | "Little Something" (Mag Lam) | Drama | | |
| 16 Jul– 12 Aug | Reality Check 心路GPS (PG) | 20 | Lee Yim-fong (producer); Ruco Chan, Louise Lee, Rebecca Chan, Mak Cheung-ching, Priscilla Wong, Kaki Leung | "心路GPS" (Ruco Chan) | Drama | | |
| 13 Aug– 16 Sep | Bullet Brain 神探高倫布 (PG13 Violence) | 25 | Lee Tim-sing (producer); Wayne Lai, Natalie Tong, Ngo Ka-nin, Edwin Siu, Sire Ma | "我的歷史" (Edwin Siu) | Period crime drama | | |

=== 9.00pm TVB series ===
These dramas air in Singapore from 9:00pm to 10:00pm, Monday to Friday on VV Drama.

| Broadcast | English title (Chinese title) | Eps. | Cast and crew | Theme song(s) | Genre | Notes | Official website |
|---|---|---|---|---|---|---|---|
| 11 Dec 2012– 21 Jan | Master of Play 心戰 (NC16 Mature Themes) | 30 | Jonathan Chik (producer); Adam Cheng, Moses Chan, Kenny Wong, Maggie Shiu, Aimee Chan | "界限" (Adam Cheng) | Crime drama, thriller | | Official website |
| 22 Jan– 25 Feb | Three Kingdoms RPG 回到三國 (PG) | 25 | Lau Kar-ho (producer); Raymond Lam, Kenneth Ma, Ruco Chan, Tavia Yeung, Ha Yu, Lau Kong | "等你回來" (Raymond Lam) | Historical fiction, science fiction | | Official website |
| 26 Feb– 1 Apr | The Last Steep Ascent 天梯 (PG) | 25 | Lee Tim-shing (producer); Moses Chan, Maggie Cheung Ho-yee, Kenny Wong, Aimee Chan, Helena Law, Edwin Siu, Cheung Kwok-keung, Elliot Ngok | "一生一心" (Hubert Wu) | Period drama, romance | | Official website |
| 2 Apr– 16 May | The Confidant 大太監 (PG) | 33 | Marco Law (producer); Wayne Lai, Michelle Yim, Maggie Shiu, Raymond Wong Ho-yin, Aimee Chan, Nancy Wu, Raymond Cho, Edwin Siu, Elliot Ngok, Natalie Tong, Oscar Leung, Power Chan | Opening: "相濡以沫" (Shirley Kwan); Ending: "日月" (Wayne Lai, Nancy Wu) | Historic fiction | TVB 45th Anniversary Drama | Official website |
| 17 May– 21 Jun | Friendly Fire 法網狙擊 (PG13 Mature Themes) | 26 | Tommy Leung, Man Wai-hung (producers); Michael Tse, Tavia Yeung, Sammy Leung, Sharon Chan, Louis Yuen, Benz Hui, Alice Chan, Vincent Wong, Oscar Leung | "疑幻人生" (Michael Tse and Sammy Leung) | Legal drama | | Official website |
| 24 Jun– 19 Jul | The Day of Days 初五啟市錄 (PG) | 20 | Sonija Kwok, Sunny Chan, Raymond Wong Ho-yin, Cheung Kwok-keung, Katy Kung, Lin Xiawei | "揮春啟示錄" (FAMA) | Period drama | | |
| 22 Jul– 30 Aug | Beauty at War 金枝慾孽（貳） (PG) | 30 | Jonathan Chik (producer); Sheren Tang, Ada Choi, Christine Ng, Moses Chan, Kenny Wong, Eddie Kwan | | Period drama | | |

=== 10.00pm TVB sitcoms ===
These dramas air in Singapore from 10:00pm to 10:30pm, Monday to Friday on VV Drama.

| Broadcast | English title (Chinese title) | Eps. | Cast and crew | Theme song(s) | Genre | Notes | Official website |
|---|---|---|---|---|---|---|---|
| 15 Oct 2012– 26 Apr | Til Love Do Us Lie 結分謊情式 (NC16 Mature Themes) | 139 | Kwan Wing-chung (producer); Eddie Cheung, Kiki Sheung, Joyce Tang, Hanjin Tan, Lin Xiawei, Benjamin Yuen, Susan Tse, Bowie Wu | "Right On Time" (Hanjin Tan, Kiki Sheung) | Sitcom | | Official website |
| 29 Apr– 20 June 2014 | Come Home Love 愛·回家 (PG) | 300 | Lau Dan, Tsui Wing, Lai Lok-yi, Florence Kwok, Yvonne Lam, Joey Law, Angel Chiang, Queenie Chu | "擁抱愛" (Joyce Cheng) | Sitcom | | Official website |

=== 7.45pm TVB series ===
These dramas air in Singapore from 7:45pm to 9:30pm, weekends on VV Drama, 2 episodes back-to-back.

| Broadcast | English title (Chinese title) | Eps. | Cast and crew | Theme song(s) | Genre | Notes | Official website |
|---|---|---|---|---|---|---|---|
| 23 Dec 2012– 9 Feb | King Maker 造王者 (PG) | 28 | Leung Choi-yuen (producer); Wayne Lai, Kent Cheng, Pierre Ngo, Lai Lok-yi, Kristal Tin, Natalie Tong, Elaine Yiu, Kingdom Yuen, Florence Kwok, Kwok Fung | "追夢者" (Leo Ku) | Historical fiction | | Official website |
| 10 Feb– 31 Mar | Highs and Lows 雷霆掃毒 (NC16 Mature Themes) | 30 | Lam Chi-wah (producer); Michael Miu, Raymond Lam, Kate Tsui, Elaine Ng, Ella Koon, Ben Wong, Jin Au-yeung, Derek Kok, Alex Lam, Law Lok-lam | Opening: Theme music Ending: "幼稚完" (Raymond Lam) | Crime drama, action | | Official website |
| 6 Apr– 5 May | Inbound Troubles 老表，你好嘢! (PG) | 20 | Wong Wai-sing (producer); Roger Kwok, Wong Cho-lam, Joey Meng, Ivana Wong, Angela Tong, Louis Cheung, Tommy Wong, Mimi Choo | "大家" (Ivana Wong, Wong Cho-lam) | Comedy drama | | Official website |
| 11 May– 22 Jun | A Great Way to Care II 仁心解碼II (PG13 Violence) | 25 | Marco Law (producer); Alex Fong, Tavia Yeung, Yoyo Mung, Ben Wong, Edwin Siu, Aimee Chan | "圍牆" (Edwin Siu) | Medical drama | Expected to broadcast | |
| 23 Jun– 4 Aug | Slow Boat Home 情越海岸線 (PG) | 25 | Leung Choi-yuen (producer); Ruco Chan, Raymond Wong Ho-yin, Aimee Chan, Selena Li, Matt Yeung, Cilla Kung | | Romantic drama | Expected to broadcast | |

== China ==
=== 2.00pm series ===
These dramas air in Singapore from 7:15am to 8:15am, and repeats from 2:00pm to 3:00pm and 11:45pm to 12:45am, weekends on VV Drama.

| Broadcast | English title (Chinese title) | Eps. | Cast and crew | Theme song(s) | Genre | Notes | Official website |
|---|---|---|---|---|---|---|---|
| 5 Jan– 14 Apr | Naked Wedding 裸婚時代 (PG) | 30 | Wen Zhang, Yao Di, Zhang Kai Li, Ding Jia Li, Han Tong Sheng | Opening: 重来 (Tiger Huang); Ending: 等不到的爱 (Wen Zhang) | Romance | | |

=== Saturday 6.00pm series ===
These dramas air in Singapore from 6:00pm to 7:45pm, Saturdays on VV Drama, two episodes back-to-back.

| Broadcast | English title (Chinese title) | Eps. | Cast and crew | Theme song(s) | Genre | Notes | Official website |
|---|---|---|---|---|---|---|---|
| 6 Oct 2012– 9 Mar | The Emperor's Harem 后宫 (PG) | 46 | Ady An, Feng Shao Feng, Tavia Yeung, Patrick Tam | | Historical fiction | Broadcast from 7.45pm to 9.30pm until 10 Nov | Official Website |
| 16 Mar– 29 Jun | Beauties of the Emperor 王的女人 (PG13 Violence) | 32 | Ming Dow, Joe Chen, Luo Jin, Yang Shanshan, Jin Sha, Tian Liang, Xie Lei, Li Zhinan, Hu Yajie | | Historical fiction | | |

== Taiwan ==
=== Sunday 6.00pm series ===
These dramas air in Singapore from 6:00pm to 7:45pm, Saturdays on VV Drama, two episodes back-to-back.

| Broadcast | English title (Chinese title) | Eps. | Cast and crew | Theme song(s) | Genre | Notes | Official website |
|---|---|---|---|---|---|---|---|
| 19 Aug 2012– 16 Jun | Rookies' Diary 新兵日記 (PG13 Sexual References) | 73 | Lee Hsing-wen, How Yao, Chantel Liu, Pang Yong Zhi, Chunya Chao, Jun Fu, Derek Chan, Denny Tang, David Lin, Hsia Zhi-feng, Qian Jun-zhong, Penber Pan, Hao Jiao Xiang Qi, Debbie Huang, Eison Cai, Hans Cheng, Chen Bai-han, Novia Lin | Opening: 年輕的喝采 Ending: 我相信 (Yang Pei-An) | Comedy drama, army-related | Dubbed in Mandarin, broadcast from 7.45pm to 9.30pm until 11 Nov | Official Website |

== Japan ==
These dramas air in Singapore from 10:30pm to 12:45am, Fridays on VV Drama, two episodes back-to-back.

| Broadcast | English title (Chinese title) | Eps. | Cast and crew | Theme song(s) | Genre | Notes | Official website |
|---|---|---|---|---|---|---|---|
| 21 Dec 2012– 25 Jan | Antarctica 南極大陸 (PG) | 10 | Takuya Kimura, Teruyuki Kagawa, Yusuke Yamamoto, Masato Sakai | | Fictional drama | | Official website |
| 1 Feb - 1 Mar | Untouchable アンタッチャブル (PG13 Mature Themes) | 9 | Nakama Yukie, Kaname Jun | "Orion" (Girl Next Door) | Mystery, crime | | Official website |
| 8 Mar - 12 Apr | Rich Man, Poor Woman 窮小姐与富哥哥 リッチマン、プアウーマン (PG) | 11 | Oguri Shun, Ishihara Satomi, Saki Aibu, Arata Iura | "ヒカリヘ" (Miwa) | | | Official website |

== Korea ==
=== Saturday 9.30pm series ===
These dramas air in Singapore from 9:30pm to 11:45pm, Saturdays on VV Drama, two episodes back-to-back.

| Broadcast | English title (Chinese title) | Eps. | Cast and crew | Theme song(s) | Genre | Notes | Official website |
|---|---|---|---|---|---|---|---|
| 24 Nov 2012– 26 Jan | Moon Embracing the Sun 捧日之月 해를 품은 달 (PG) | 20 | Oh Gyeong-hun (producer), Kim Soo-hyun, Han Ga-in, Jung Il-woo, Kim Min-seo | | Historical drama, romance | | Official website |
| 2 Feb– 23 Mar | Me Too, Flower! 我也是花 나도, 꽃 (PG) | 15 | Ko Dong-soo (producer), Lee Ji-ah, Yoon Shi-yoon, Seo Hyo-rim, Lee Gi-kwang | | Comedy, romance | | Official website |
| 30 Mar– 23 Mar | KPOP Extreme Survival; Kpop 最强生死战 (PG) | 14 | Go Eun Ah, Park Yoo Hwan, Kwak Yong Hwan | | K-Pop | | |

=== Sunday 9.30pm series ===
These dramas air in Singapore from 9:30pm to 11:45pm, Sundays on VV Drama, two episodes back-to-back.

| Broadcast | English title (Chinese title) | Eps. | Cast and crew | Theme song(s) | Genre | Notes | Official website |
|---|---|---|---|---|---|---|---|
| 16 Dec 2012– 10 Feb | Hate to Lose 绝不认输 지고는 못살아 ! (PG) | 18 | Oh Kyung-hoon (producer), Choi Ji-woo, Yoon Sang-hyun | | Romance, comedy | | Official website |
| 17 Feb- 21 Apr | Immortal Masterpiece 不朽的名作 (PG) | 20 | Han Jae-suk, Park Sun-young, Lee Ha-nui, Go Doo-shim, Go Yoon-hoo | | Drama | | |

== Other countries ==
=== 5.45pm series ===
These dramas air in Singapore from 5:45pm to 7:00pm, Monday to Friday on VV Drama.

| Broadcast | English title (Chinese title) | Eps. | Cast and crew | Theme song(s) | Genre | Notes | Official website |
|---|---|---|---|---|---|---|---|
| 29 Oct 2012– 22 Jan | Fatal Lover 危險的女人 위험한 여자 (PG) | 62 | Go Eun-mi, Hwang Bo-ra, Kim Jung-hyun, Yeo Hyun-soo | | Melodrama | Korean | Official website |
| 23 Jan– 16 Apr | Grand Queen Insu 仁粹大妃 인수대비 (PG) | 60 | Chae Shi-ra, Kim Mi-sook, Kim Young-ho, Baek Sung-hyun, Ham Eun-jung | | Historical fiction, romance | Korean | Official website |

=== 7.00pm series ===
These dramas air in Singapore from 7:00pm to 8:00pm, Monday to Friday on VV Drama.

| Broadcast | English title (Chinese title) | Eps. | Cast and crew | Theme song(s) | Genre | Notes | Official website |
|---|---|---|---|---|---|---|---|
| 11 Oct 2012– 13 Feb | Gung Hay Fat Choy 我們發財了！ (PG) | 90 | Cai Zhen-nan, Wang Juan, James Wen, Alice Ko, Tian Xin, Li Qian-na, Patrick Lee, Gao Yu-zhen, Penny Xie, Fabien Yang | Opening: 白日夢 (Yisa Yu); Ending: 只想抱著你 (Nylon Chen) | Comedy drama | Taiwanese | Official website |
| 14 Feb– 24 May | Love, Now 真愛趁現在 (PG) | 72 | Annie Chen, George Hu, Bobby Dou, Harry Chang, Vivi Lee | Opening: 一起去跑步 (Cosmos People); Ending: 暫時的男朋友 (Yen-j) | Romance | Taiwanese | Official website |

== See also ==
- VV Drama
