= Next Future =

Studio album by Girl Next Door
- Released: January 20, 2010
- Genre: J-Pop
- Label: Avex Trax

Girl Next Door chronology
Girl Next Door (2008)	Next Future (2010)	Destination (2011)

Normal Edition

Next Future is the second album from Girl Next Door released on January 20, 2010. It was released in two versions, a Normal Edition and an Album+DVD version. The first press of the Album+DVD version came with a special booklet, while the first press of the Normal Edition came with a Non-Stop Euro Remix disc of their debut album Girl Next Door, excluding the instrumentals.

This is their 1st album to peak at #1 on the Oricon Albums Chart.

== Track list ==
Next Future
No.	Title	Length
1.	"Jump"	4:08
2.	"Infinity"	5:47
3.	"Winter Crystal"	4:43
4.	"Sora e (空へ; To the Sky)"	3:37
5.	"Tri△ngle"	5:28
6.	"Seeds of Dream"	4:44
7.	"Artemis (INST)"	3:50
8.	"Orion"	4:01
9.	"Mubōbi na Jun'Ai (無防備な純愛; Defenseless Pure Love)"	4:55
10.	"Suzukaze Kaoru Hana (INST) (涼風薫花; Cool Breeze, Fragrant Flowers)"	0:29
11.	"Sa・ku・ra"	6:47
12.	"Be Your Wings"	4:05
13.	"Koi no Mahō (恋の魔法; Magic of Love)"	4:21
14.	"Friendship"	4:40
15.	"Infinity ~Ballad Version~" (hidden track)

Super Eurobeat presents Girl Next Door Eurobeat Non-stop Remix
No.	Title	Length
1.	"Mega Mix"	2:02
2.	"Gūzen no Kakuritsu (Oh My Gold mix)" (from Seeds of Dream)	5:56
3.	"Winter Game (Eurogrooves remix)"	4:44
4.	"Escape (Serendipity SCP version)"	3:49
5.	"Shiawase no Jōken (HRG remix)"	5:07
6.	"Winter Mirage (Eurogrooves remix)"	7:15
7.	"Breath (Breathing mix)"	5:44
8.	"Winter Garden (GoGo's remix)"	4:11
9.	"Jōnetsu no Daishō (Diamond Mirror SCP version)" (from Infinity)	4:34
10.	"Fine After Rain (Cinematic Extraordinaire Delta version)"	3:42
11.	"Climber's High (Dima remix)"	4:56
12.	"Power of Love (Morris Capaldi Versus GND remix)"	5:55
13.	"Drive Away (GoGo's remix)" (from Orion)	4:21

DVD
No.	Title	Length
1.	"Seeds of Dream (music video)"
2.	"Infinity (music video)"
3.	"Be Your Wings (music video)"
4.	"Orion (music video)"
5.	"Jump (music video)"
6.	"Friendship (music video)"
