= Hub Drama First =

Hub Drama First HUB戏剧首选
- Country: Singapore
- Broadcast area: Nationwide
- Network: StarHub TV

Programming
- Picture format: HDTV 1080i

Ownership
- Owner: StarHub
- Sister channels: Sensasi; SuperSports Arena; SuperSports; VV Drama; E City

History
- Launched: 2 June 2014

Hub Drama First (Chinese: HUB戏剧首选; formerly known as TVB First) is a Hong Kong drama channel co-established by TVBI and StarHub. While broadcasting the newest HK drama on the same time HK does, it also plays TVB dramas that are firstly released overseas. This channel was officially launched on 2 June 2014.

== See also ==
- StarHub TV
- VV Drama
- Sensasi
- E City
