= The Voice (Singaporean and Malaysian TV series) =

Chinese-language TV series

- Chinese: The Voice 决战好声
- Genre: Reality competition
- Created by: John de Mol Jr.
- Presented by: Siow Hui Mei; Wong Woon Hong
- Judges: Sky Wu; Ding Dang; Hanjin Tan; Gary Chaw
- Composer: Martijn Schimmer
- Countries of origin: Malaysia; Singapore
- Original language: Mandarin
- No. of seasons: 1
- No. of episodes: 14

Production
- Production locations: Pinewood Iskandar Malaysia Studios, Johor, Malaysia
- Production companies: mm2 Entertainment; Malaysia Astro; Singapore StarHub TV

Original release
- Network: Malaysia Astro AEC; Singapore E City
- Release: 17 September – 17 December 2017

Related
- The Voice (franchise)

The Voice (Chinese: 决战好声; pinyin: Juézhàn hǎo shēng) is a Chinese-language Malaysian-Singaporean reality talent show and a version of The Voice format created by John de Mol Jr.. The series premiered on Mandarin Chinese-language channels StarHub TV E City and Astro AEC. It was hosted by Siow Hui Mei and Wong Hoon Hong. The coaches were Sky Wu, Ding Dang, Hanjin Tan and Gary Chaw.

== Format ==
The show's format features four stages of competition: blind auditions, battle rounds, knockouts, and live performance shows.

=== Blind auditions ===
The four judges/coaches choose teams of contestants through a blind audition process. Each judge has the length of the auditioner's performance to decide if he or she wants that singer on his or her team. If two or more judges want the same singer (as happens frequently), the singer has the final choice of coach.

=== The Battles ===
Each team of singers is mentored and developed by its coach. In the second stage, called the Battle Round, coaches will pair up two of their artists to battle against each other in a duet arrangement, after that the coach had to choose one of them to advance the next round, which is called Knockout Round. After making the decision from the coach, other coaches can steal the losing artists. Each coach can save two losing artists from another team.

=== The Knockouts ===
In the third stage, called the Knockout Round, the 8 remaining artists of each team will be pair up with their coach and have a player-killing arrangement. Unlike the Battles, artists have to pick a song (or chosen by his/her coach) and have a solo performance, after which the coach need to choose one of them as a winner and advance to the Live Shows. There is no steal for this round, so the other coaches are not allowed to steal the losing artist to their teams

=== The Live Shows ===
The winners of the Knockouts will advance to this round. In the week one performance, the arrangement in this round is similar to the live playoffs from the American version, but there has the highest public votes receiver can advance to the next round (American version can bring 2 highest votes artists), and the coach can save one of the remaining artists. And the coming week is the live finale, the top two artists of each team will perform a solo song, and only two artists of all teams can advance to the "final showdown", which all the cumulative votes will be reset in this round. The highest public votes receiver in the "final showdown" will be The Voice winner. EDITED

== Coaches ==
On 6 June 2017, The Voice officially announced that Hanjin Tan, Della Ding, Gary Chaw and Sky Wu would be the coaches for the series.

Coaches gallery

Hanjin Tan

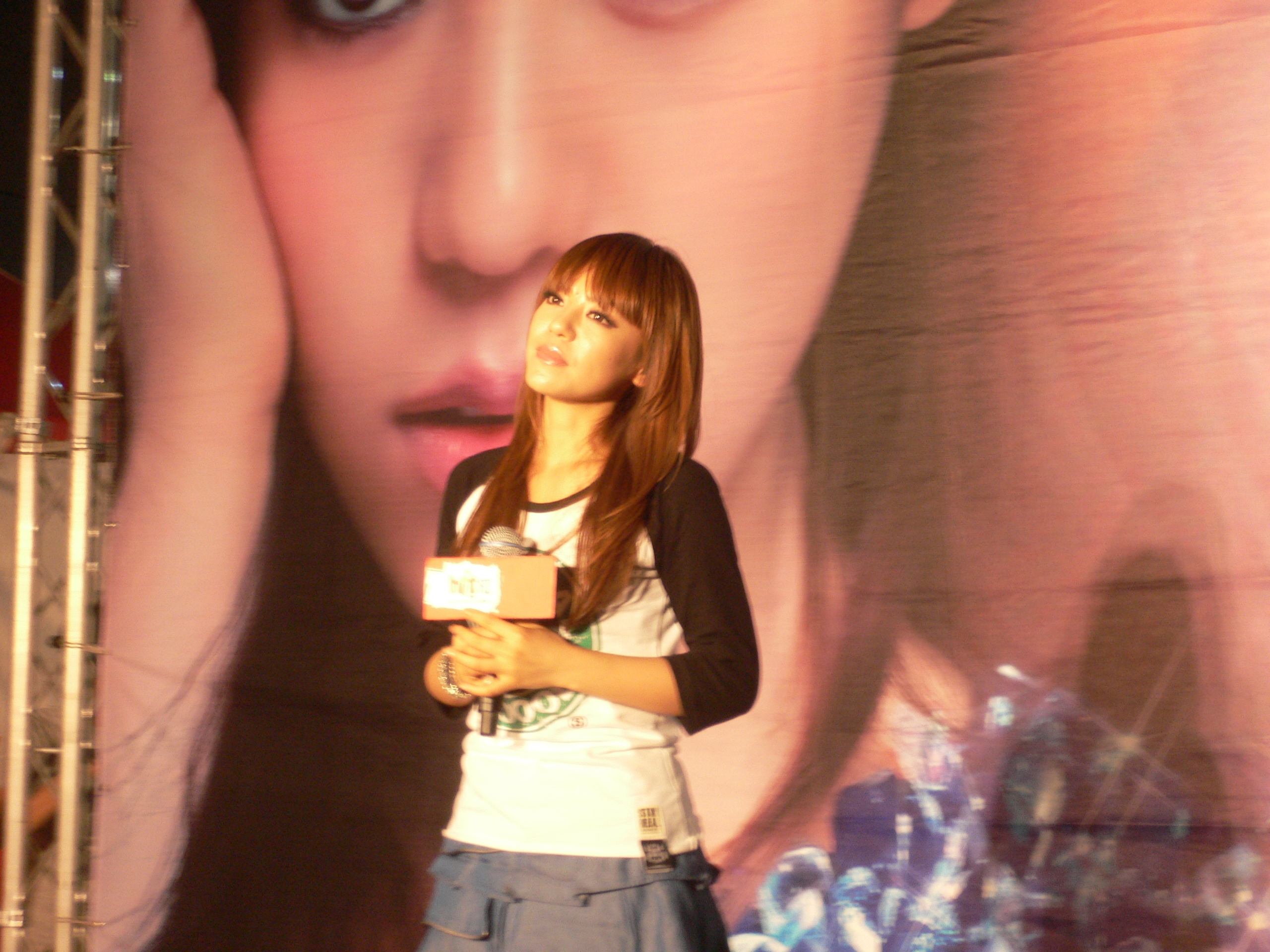
Della Ding

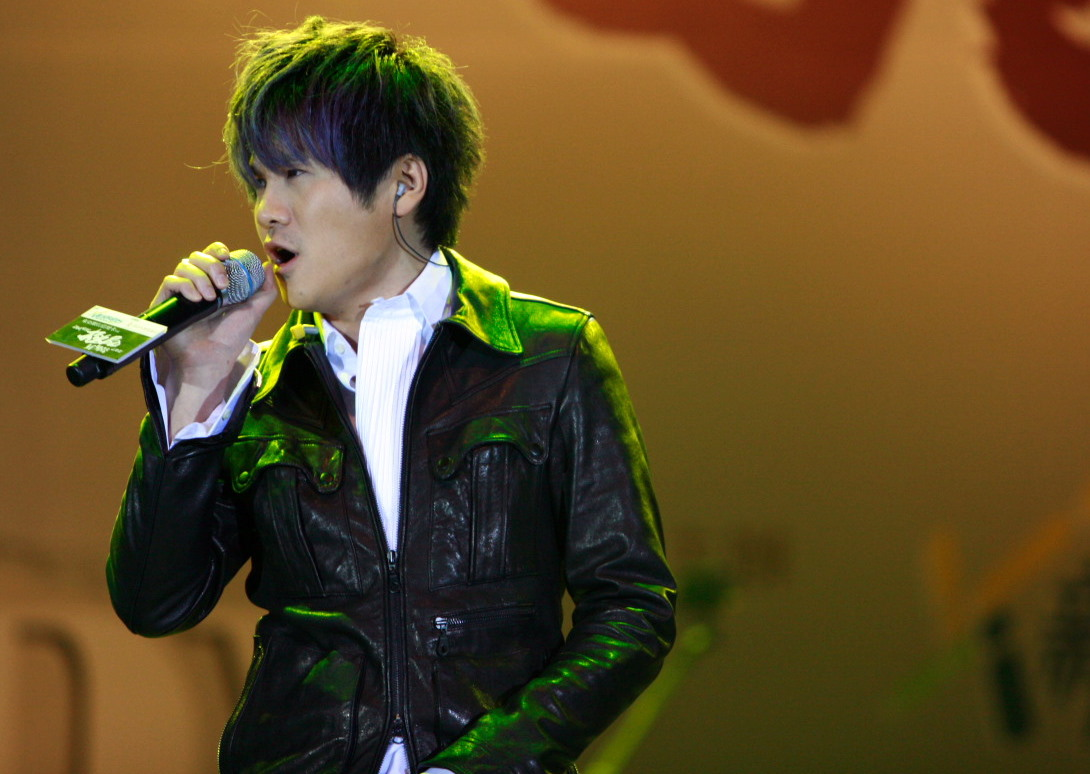
Gary Chaw

Sky Wu

== Season overview ==
- Team Hanjin
- Team Della
- Team Gary
- Team Sky

Season	First aired	Last aired	Winner	Runner-up	Other finalist(s)	Winning Coach	Hosts	Coaches (chairs' order)			
Season	First aired	Last aired	Winner	Runner-up	Other finalist(s)	Winning Coach	Hosts	1	2	3	4
1	September 17, 2017	December 17, 2017	Lim Wen Suen	Kenny Low	Anna Chua	Gary Chaw	Siow Hui Mei; Wong Hoon Hong	Hanjin	Della	Gary	Sky
1	September 17, 2017	December 17, 2017	Lim Wen Suen	Kenny Low	Becky Ye	Gary Chaw	Siow Hui Mei; Wong Hoon Hong	Hanjin	Della	Gary	Sky
1	September 17, 2017	December 17, 2017	Lim Wen Suen	Kenny Low	Chere Tan	Gary Chaw	Siow Hui Mei; Wong Hoon Hong	Hanjin	Della	Gary	Sky
1	September 17, 2017	December 17, 2017	Lim Wen Suen	Kenny Low	Daniel Sher	Gary Chaw	Siow Hui Mei; Wong Hoon Hong	Hanjin	Della	Gary	Sky
1	September 17, 2017	December 17, 2017	Lim Wen Suen	Kenny Low	Isaac Ong	Gary Chaw	Siow Hui Mei; Wong Hoon Hong	Hanjin	Della	Gary	Sky
1	September 17, 2017	December 17, 2017	Lim Wen Suen	Kenny Low	Yao Wong	Gary Chaw	Siow Hui Mei; Wong Hoon Hong	Hanjin	Della	Gary	Sky

== Teams ==
Color key

- Winner
- Runner-up
- Eliminated in the Live Finals
- Eliminated in Live Semifinals
- Eliminated in the Knockout rounds
- Artist stolen by another coach
- Eliminated in the Battle rounds

Coaches	Top 48 artists			
Hanjin Tan				
Hanjin Tan	Kenny Low 刘国辉	Daniel Sher 丹尼尔	Nick Kung 龚建华	An Hung Lin 闇鸿麟
Hanjin Tan	Alicia Yeo 杨楚容	Sharon Cheng 庄遂霖	Eugene Wen 尹景顺	See Ke Xin 施岢妡
Hanjin Tan	~~Ape Kao 高恺蔚~~	~~Low Siew Mun 刘绍雯~~	~~Yao Wong 黄欣瑶~~	Nutserlar Lim 林巧慧
Hanjin Tan	Low Mei Qi 刘美琪	Sharon Wong 黄雪云		
Della Ding				
Della Ding	Annabella Chua 蔡咏琪	Cherelle Tan 陈宣清	Zhang Minhua 张旻华 & Alfred Sng 孙英豪	Izen Kong 龚杰尉
Della Ding	Bryan Toro 黄家万	Jesse Chua 蔡静婷	JoA James 官有显	Low Siew Mun 刘绍雯
Della Ding	~~Zoey Hui 许美琦~~	~~Jelly Lee 李国玮~~	Rax Teh 王郑浚仁	Vessel Liu 刘子绮
Della Ding	Beatrice Pung 彭炜茵	Will Liew 刘俊伟		
Gary Chaw				
Gary Chaw	Lim Wen Suen 林文荪	Isaac Ong 翁奕杰	Lin Jia Han 林珈含	Daniel Lim 林峻民
Gary Chaw	Ape Kao 高恺蔚	Catherine Leong 梁佩颖	Kenneth Shih 施勤	Jelly Lee 李国玮
Gary Chaw	~~Nick Kung 龚建华~~	~~Sharon Cheng 庄遂霖~~	Wendy Oon 温子仙	Ryo Hee 许汉良
Gary Chaw	Adel Yang 杨紫薇	Celine Wong 黄彤欣		
Sky Wu				
Sky Wu	Yao Wong 黄欣瑶	Becky Yeung 杨碧琪	Suzanne Low 刘思延	Zoey Hui 许美琦
Sky Wu	Johnson Wong 黄庄盛	Only 唯一	Jay Chen 陈蓝杰	JY Chong 张家榕
Sky Wu	~~Cherelle Tan 陈宣清~~	Vivian Chua 蔡忆雯	Juni Goh 吴峻毅	Steyv Yap 叶映妤
Sky Wu	Kelvin Khoo 古伟权	Clement Lo 罗嘉铭		
Note: Italicized names are stolen contestants (names struck through within former teams) .

== Blind auditions ==
The Blind Auditions were taped between 5, 6, 10 and 11 July 2017 at Pinewood Iskandar Malaysia Studios. The first episode of the Blind Auditions premiered on 17 September 2017.

Color key:

✔	Coach hit his/her "I WANT YOU" button
	Artist defaulted to this coach's team
	Artist elected to join this coach's team
	Artist eliminated with no coach pressing his or her "I WANT YOU" button

=== Episode 1 (17 September) ===
The season's premiere aired on Sunday, 17 September 2017.

Group performance: The Voice coaches – Medley of "没时间后悔", "我爱他", "寂寞先生", and "特别的爱给特别的你".

Order	Artist	Age	Hometown	Song	Coach's and contestant's choices			
Order	Artist	Age	Hometown	Song	Hanjin	Della	Gary	Sky
1	Zoey Hui 许美琦	18	Kuala Lumpur, Malaysia	"泡沫"	✔	✔	—	✔
2	Kenny Low 刘国辉	31	Kuala Lumpur, Malaysia	"你给我听好"	✔	✔	✔	✔
3	Cherelle Tan 陈宣清	26	Singapore	"牙买加的槟榔"	—	—	—	✔
4	See Ke Xin 施岢妡	24	Penang, Malaysia	掉了	✔	—	✔	—
5	周俐伶	31	Indonesia	"最幸福的事"	—	—	—	—
6	Apprillissa Sue Ann	28	Sabah, Malaysia	"失语者"	—	—	—	—
7	Nutserlar Lim 林巧慧	27	Perlis, Malaysia	"When We Were Young"	✔	—	✔	—
8	林延芯	20	Singapore	"当我们同在一起"	—	—	—	—
9	Jay Chen 陈蓝杰	26	Taipei, Taiwan	"狼"	—	—	—	✔

=== Episode 2 (24 September) ===
Order	Artist	Age	Hometown	Song	Coach's and contestant's choices			
Order	Artist	Age	Hometown	Song	Hanjin	Della	Gary	Sky
1	Lin Jia Han 林珈含	22	Taipei, Taiwan	"不太乖"	✔	✔	✔	—
2	Low Mei Qi 刘美琪	25	Singapore	"True Love"	✔	—	✔	—
3	黄毅泯	32	Sarawak, Malaysia	"爱与愁"	—	—	—	—
4	Jesse Chua 蔡静婷	31	Penang, Malaysia	"女爵"	✔	✔	✔	✔
5	Rax Teh 王郑浚仁	29	Penang, Malaysia	"默"	—	✔	—	—
6	Low Siew Mun 刘绍雯	17	Kuala Lumpur, Malaysia	"如烟"	✔	—	✔	—
7	Only 唯一 (Irwin Fua 潘泳任 & Eli Low 刘嘉慧)	30 / 23	Singapore	"你被写在我的歌里"	—	—	—	✔
8	朱嘉仪	24	Kuala Lumpur, Malaysia	"我爱她"	—	—	—	—
9	郑玮琳	21	Sarawak, Malaysia	"被遗忘的时光"	—	—	—	—
10	Johnson Wong 黄庄盛	51	Pahang, Malaysia	"山丘"	✔	✔	✔	✔

=== Episode 3 (1 October) ===
Order	Artist	Age	Hometown	Song	Coach's and contestant's choices			
Order	Artist	Age	Hometown	Song	Hanjin	Della	Gary	Sky
1	Juni Goh 吴峻毅	31	Singapore	"一步一步爱"	—	—	—	✔
2	JoA James 官有显	27	Kuala Lumpur, Malaysia	"洋葱"	—	✔	✔	—
3	陈明慧	26	Kuala Lumpur, Malaysia	"隐形的翅膀"	—	—	—	—
4	Kenneth Shih 施勤	28	Singapore	"看看"	—	—	✔	✔
5	Kelvin Khoo 古伟权	18	Kuala Lumpur, Malaysia	"有没有"	—	—	✔	✔
6	Isaac Ong 翁奕杰	29	Singapore	"世界唯一的你"	✔	✔	✔	✔
7	Alicia Yeo 杨楚容	26	Malaysia	"麦田捕手"	✔	—	✔	—
8	张筱萱	22	Taiwan	"旅行的意义"	—	—	—	—
9	李玉钦	43	Sarawak, Malaysia	"我是不是你最疼爱的人"	—	—	—	—
10	Annabella Chua 蔡咏琪	17	Johor, Malaysia	"再见"	✔	✔	—	✔

=== Episode 4 (8 October) ===
Order	Artist	Age	Hometown	Song	Coach's and contestant's choices			
Order	Artist	Age	Hometown	Song	Hanjin	Della	Gary	Sky
1	Eugene Wen 尹景顺	27	Kuala Lumpur, Malaysia	"无与伦比的美丽"	✔	✔	—	
2	Catherine Leong 梁佩颖	24	Kuala Lumpur, Malaysia	"Radio"	—	—	✔	—
3	Ape Kao 高恺蔚	24	Taiwan	"那些你很冒险的梦"	✔		✔	✔
4	Vessel Liu 刘子绮	22	Sarawak, Malaysia	"听见下雨的声音"	—	✔	—	✔
5	Jelly Lee 李国玮	40	Taiwan	"巧克力"	✔	✔	✔	✔
6	Daniel Lim 林峻民	29	Singapore	"鬼迷心窍"	—	—	✔	—
7	许淑怡	23	Melaka, Malaysia	"野蔷薇"	—	—	—	—
8	吴隆正	18	Kuala Lumpur, Malaysia	"人质"	—	—	—	—
9	Becky Yeung 杨碧琪	24	Hong Kong	"开始和结束之间"	—	—	✔	✔

=== Episode 5 (15 October) ===
Order	Artist	Age	Hometown	Song	Coach's and contestant's choices			
Order	Artist	Age	Hometown	Song	Hanjin	Della	Gary	Sky
1	Sharon Wong 黄雪云	51	Kuala Lumpur, Malaysia	"女人花"	✔	✔	—	✔
2	Canaan Philip	39	Sarawak, Malaysia	"生命有一种绝对"	—	—	—	—
3	Sunny Lim 林婗姗	26	Singapore	"恶作剧"	—	—	—	—
4	Nick Kung 龚建华	24	Sabah, Malaysia	"3-7-20-1"	✔	✔	✔	✔
5	Beatrice Pung 彭炜茵	17	Singapore	"小情歌"	—	✔	—	
6	Suzanne Low 刘思延	20	Penang, Malaysia	"陌生人"	—	—	—	✔
7	黄祖娴	21	Sarawak, Malaysia	"你一直在心中"	—	—	—	—
8	Adel Yang 杨紫薇	18	Sarawak, Malaysia	" 听见下雨的声音"	—	—	✔	✔
9	JY Chong 张家榕	28	Sabah, Malaysia	"第三人称"	—	—	—	✔
10	Wendy Oon 温子仙	20	Johor, Malaysia	"躺在你的衣柜"	—	—	✔	—

^{1} Gary Chaw pushed Sky Wu's button.

=== Episode 6 (22 October) ===
Order	Artist	Age	Hometown	Song	Coach's and contestant's choices			
Order	Artist	Age	Hometown	Song	Hanjin	Della	Gary	Sky
1	Yao Wong 黄欣瑶	18	Malaysia	"燕尾蝶"	✔	✔	—	—
2	Zhang Minhua 张旻华 & Alfred Sng 孙英豪	27 / 26	Singapore	"我喜欢（不，我爱）"	—	✔	—	—
3	An Hung Lin 闇鸿麟	25	Pingtung County, Taiwan	"还是要相信爱情啊混蛋们"	✔	✔	✔	✔
4	Celine Wong 黄彤欣	19	Singapore	"无底洞"	—	—	✔	—
5	王圣豪	25	Penang, Malaysia	"你真的不想流浪"	—	—	—	—
6	张梦霜	27	Malaysia	"听不到"	—	—	—	—
7	Will Liew 刘俊伟	35	Singapore	"福尔摩斯"	—	✔	—	—
8	Sharon Cheng 庄遂霖	27	Johor, Malaysia	"一个便当"	—	—	✔	—
9	黄瑸霏	19	Sarawak, Malaysia	"左耳"	—	—	—	—
10	Steyv Yap 叶映妤	21	Selangor, Malaysia	"皇后区的皇后"	✔	✔	—	✔

=== Episode 7 (29 October) ===
Order	Artist	Age	Hometown	Song	Coach's and contestant's choices			
Order	Artist	Age	Hometown	Song	Hanjin	Della	Gary	Sky
1	Izen Kong 龚杰尉	22	Malaysia	"走钢索的人"	✔	✔	✔	✔
2	Lim Wen Suen 林文荪	30	Tawau, Malaysia	"身骑白马"	✔	✔	✔	✔
3	甄慧霞	17	Indonesia / Singapore	"Let It Go"	—	—	—	—
4	Daniel Sher 丹尼尔	27	Johor, Malaysia	"Funky 那个女孩"	✔	✔	✔	✔
5	Vivian Chua 蔡忆雯	25	Kuala Lumpur, Malaysia	"崇拜"	Team full	—	—	✔
6	Clement Lo 罗嘉铭	25	Pahang, Malaysia	"现在你是怎样的人"	Team full	—	—	✔
7	Ryo Hee 许汉良	39	Kuala Lumpur, Malaysia	"我不愿让你一个人"	Team full	✔	✔	Team full
8	刘巧莉	20	Kuala Lumpur, Malaysia	"蓝色雨"	Team full	—	Team full	Team full
9	Bryan Toro 黄家万	28	Singapore	"漂向北方"	Team full	✔	Team full	Team full

== The Battles ==
The Battle round started with episode 8 and ended with episode 10 (broadcast on 5, 12, 19 November 2017). As with most of the other versions, the coaches can steal two losing artists from another coach. Contestants who win their battle or are stolen by another coach will advance to the Knockout rounds.

Color key:

Artist won the Battle and advanced to the Knockouts
Artist lost the Battle but was stolen by another coach and advanced to the Knockouts
Artist lost the Battle and was eliminated

Episode	Coach	Order	Winner	Song	Loser	'Steal' result			
Episode	Coach	Order	Winner	Song	Loser	Hanjin	Della	Gary	Sky
Episode 8 (5 November)	Hanjin Tan	1	Daniel Sher 丹尼尔	"欧拉拉呼呼"	Nutserlar Lim 林巧慧	—N/a	—	—	—
Episode 8 (5 November)	Della Ding	2	Bryan Toro 黄家万	"我的妈"	Zoey Hui 许美琦	—	—N/a	—	✔
Episode 8 (5 November)	Gary Chaw	3	Isaac Ong 翁奕杰	"想哭就到我怀里哭"	Nick Kung 龚建华	✔	—	—N/a	—
Episode 8 (5 November)	Sky Wu	4	Becky Yeung 杨碧琪	"我要我们在一起"	Juni Goh 吴峻毅	—	—	—	—N/a
Episode 8 (5 November)	Hanjin Tan	5	Alicia Yeo 杨楚容	"布拉格广场"	Low Mei Qi 刘美琪	—N/a	—	—	—
Episode 8 (5 November)	Della Ding	6	Izen Kong 龚杰尉	"谋情害命"	Jelly Lee 李国玮	—	—N/a	✔	—
Episode 8 (5 November)	Gary Chaw	7	Catherine Leong 梁佩颖	"写一首歌"	Wendy Oon 温子仙	—	—	—N/a	—
Episode 8 (5 November)	Sky Wu	8	Johnson Wong 黄庄盛	"领悟"	Steyv Yap 叶映妤	—	—	—	—N/a
Episode 9 (12 November)	Hanjin Tan	1	See Ke Xin 施岢妡	"派对动物"	Low Siew Mun 刘绍雯	—N/a	✔	—	—
Episode 9 (12 November)	Della Ding	2	Annabella Chua 蔡咏琪	"狂风里拥抱"	Rax Teh 王郑浚仁	—	—N/a	—	—
Episode 9 (12 November)	Gary Chaw	3	Lin Jia Han 林珈含	"咖喱热狗"	Sharon Cheng 庄遂霖	✔	—	—N/a	✔
Episode 9 (12 November)	Sky Wu	4	Only 唯一	"一颗心交给谁"	Kelvin Khoo 古伟权	Team full	—	—	—N/a
Episode 9 (12 November)	Hanjin Tan	5	Kenny Low 刘国辉	"没出息"	Yao Wong 黄欣瑶	Team full	—	—	✔
Episode 9 (12 November)	Della Ding	6	Jesse Chua 蔡静婷	"原点"	Vessel Liu 刘子绮	Team full	—N/a	—	Team full
Episode 9 (12 November)	Gary Chaw	7	Kenneth Shih 施勤	"Dear Friend"	Ryo Hee 许汉良	Team full	—	—N/a	Team full
Episode 9 (12 November)	Sky Wu	8	Jay Chen 陈蓝杰	"高山青" / "站在高岗上"	Clement Lo 罗嘉铭	Team full	—	—	Team full
Episode 10 (19 November)	Hanjin Tan	1	Eugene Wen 尹景顺	"味道"	Sharon Wong 黄雪云	Team full	—	—	Team full
Episode 10 (19 November)	Della Ding	2	JoA James 官有显	"十七岁女生的温柔"	Will Liew 刘俊伟	Team full	—N/a	—	Team full
Episode 10 (19 November)	Gary Chaw	3	Daniel Lim 林峻民	"心动"	Celine Wong 黄彤欣	Team full	—	—N/a	Team full
Episode 10 (19 November)	Sky Wu	4	Suzanne Low 刘思延	"一个人跳舞"	Cherelle Tan 陈宣清	Team full	✔	✔	Team full
Episode 10 (19 November)	Hanjin Tan	5	An Hung Lin 闇鸿麟	"BB88"	Ape Kao 高恺蔚	Team full	Team full	✔	Team full
Episode 10 (19 November)	Della Ding	6	Zhang Minhua 张旻华 & Alfred Sng 孙英豪	"女孩"	Beatrice Pung 彭炜茵	Team full	Team full	Team full	Team full
Episode 10 (19 November)	Gary Chaw	7	Lim Wen Suen 林文荪	"离开情人的日子"	Adel Yang 杨紫薇	Team full	Team full	Team full	Team full
Episode 10 (19 November)	Sky Wu	8	JY Chong 张家榕	"我好想你"	Vivian Chua 蔡忆雯	Team full	Team full	Team full	Team full

== The Knockouts ==
Color key:

Artist won the Knockouts and advances to the Live shows
Artist lost the Knockouts and was eliminated

Episode	Coach	Order	Song	Artists		Song
Episode	Coach	Order	Song	Winner	Loser	Song
Episode 11 (26 November)	Sky Wu	1	"Funky Boy"	Yao Wong 黄欣瑶	Jay Chen 陈蓝杰	"怪……不怪"
Episode 11 (26 November)	Sky Wu	2	"是什么让我遇见这样的你"	Becky Yeung 杨碧琪	Only 唯一	"谢谢你"
Episode 11 (26 November)	Sky Wu	3	"天气这么热"	Zoey Hui 许美琦	Johnson Wong 黄庄盛	"没关系"
Episode 11 (26 November)	Sky Wu	4	"幸福太短"	Suzanne Low 刘思延	JY Chong 张家榕	"用情"
Episode 11 (26 November)	Della Ding	5	"A Whole New World"	Annabella Chua 蔡咏琪	Low Siew Mun 刘绍雯	"寂寞考"
Episode 11 (26 November)	Della Ding	6	"野百合也有春天"	Zhang Minhua 张旻华 & Alfred Sng 孙英豪	Bryan Toro 黄家万	"自然醒"
Episode 11 (26 November)	Della Ding	7	"烦"	Cherelle Tan 陈宣清	JoA James 官有显	"你正常吗"
Episode 11 (26 November)	Della Ding	8	"煎熬"	Izen Kong 龚杰尉	Jesse Chua 蔡静婷	"快疯了"
Episode 12 (3 December)	Gary Chaw	1	"橄榄树"	Lim Wen Suen 林文荪	Ape Kao 高恺蔚	"今天睡在这里"
Episode 12 (3 December)	Gary Chaw	2	"不好吗"	Lin Jia Han 林珈含	Catherine Leong 梁佩颖	"黑色柳丁"
Episode 12 (3 December)	Gary Chaw	3	"每次都想呼喊你的名字"	Daniel Lim 林峻民	Kenneth Shih 施勤	"想太多"
Episode 12 (3 December)	Gary Chaw	4	"放一颗心"	Isaac Ong 翁奕杰	Jelly Lee 李国玮	"给自己的歌"
Episode 12 (3 December)	Hanjin Tan	5	"飞机场的10:30"	An Hung Lin 闇鸿麟	Alicia Yeo 杨楚容	"好朋友" / "买一送一"
Episode 12 (3 December)	Hanjin Tan	6	"怎么了" / "打呼"	Nick Kung 龚建华	Sharon Cheng 庄遂霖	"喜欢呦" / "小女孩的花花世界"
Episode 12 (3 December)	Hanjin Tan	7	"你的背包"	Kenny Low 刘国辉	Eugene Wen 尹景顺	"相濡以沫"
Episode 12 (3 December)	Hanjin Tan	8	"帅到分手"	Daniel Sher 丹尼尔	See Ke Xin 施岢妡	"Hey Boy" / "Cappuccino"

== Live shows ==
Color key:

Artist was saved by the Public's votes
Artist was saved by his/her coach
Artist was eliminated

=== Week 1: Semifinals (10 December) ===
The Top 16 performed on 10 December 2017. Each team is allowed two artists advance to the finals, one is the highest public votes receiver; one is chosen by his/her coach.

Order	Coach	Artist	Song	Result
1	Sky Wu	Zoey Hui 许美琦	"奔"	Eliminated
2	Sky Wu	Yao Wong 黄欣瑶	"Chandelier"	Public's vote
3	Sky Wu	Becky Yeung 杨碧琪	"致青春"	Sky's choice
4	Sky Wu	Suzanne Low 刘思延	"睡不着的猫"	Eliminated
5	Gary Chaw	Lin Jia Han 林珈含	"维多利亚的秘密"	Eliminated
6	Gary Chaw	Isaac Ong 翁奕杰	"I'll Be There"	Gary's choice
7	Gary Chaw	Daniel Lim 林峻民	"傻瓜"	Eliminated
8	Gary Chaw	Lim Wen Suen 林文荪	"我是一只小小鸟"	Public's vote
9	Della Ding	Zhang Minhua 张旻华 & Alfred Sng 孙英豪	"UUU"	Eliminated
10	Della Ding	Annabella Chua 蔡咏琪	"寓言"	Public's vote
11	Della Ding	Izen Kong 龚杰尉	"轰炸"	Eliminated
12	Della Ding	Cherelle Tan 陈宣清	"大艺术家"	Della's choice
13	Hanjin Tan	Nick Kung 龚建华	"剩下的盛夏" / "画沙" / "全城热爱"	Eliminated
14	Hanjin Tan	An Hung Lin 闇鸿麟	"征服"	Eliminated
15	Hanjin Tan	Daniel Sher 丹尼尔	"你最美丽"	Hanjin's choice
16	Hanjin Tan	Kenny Low 刘国辉	"至少还有你" / "你是我的眼"	Public's vote

=== Week 2: Finals (17 December) ===
The finalists will perform on Sunday, 17 December 2017. The two artists with the highest votes will advance to the final showdown. The cumulative votes will be reset in the final showdown, with the winner in this round winning the competition.

Order	Coach	Artist	Song	Result
1	Hanjin Tan	Kenny Low 刘国辉	"值得" / "I Don’t Want to Miss A Thing"	Public's vote
2	Gary Chaw	Isaac Ong 翁奕杰	"我愿意"	Eliminated
3	Della Ding	Annabella Chua 蔡咏琪	"你敢不敢"	Eliminated
4	Sky Wu	Yao Wong 黄欣瑶	"Memori Tercipta"	Eliminated
5	Della Ding	Cherelle Tan 陈宣清	"你为什么说谎"	Eliminated
6	Hanjin Tan	Daniel Sher 丹尼尔	"普通朋友"	Eliminated
7	Sky Wu	Becky Yeung 杨碧琪	"寂寞公路"	Eliminated
8	Gary Chaw	Lim Wen Suen 林文荪	"风之彩"	Public's vote
Final showdown performance
1	Hanjin Tan	Kenny Low 刘国辉	"你给我听好"	Runner-up
2	Gary Chaw	Lim Wen Suen 林文荪	"身骑白马"	Winner

Non-competition performances
Order	Performer	Song
14.1	The Voice Top 8	"我们的爱" / "24K Magic" / "This is The Voice"
14.2	Della Ding and her two finalists (Annabella Chua 蔡咏琪 & Cherelle Tan 陈宣清)	"全世界不懂无所谓" / "我是一只小小鸟"
14.3	Hanjin Tan and his two finalists (Daniel Sher 丹尼尔 & Kenny Low 刘国辉)	"差不多女神和差不多先生"
14.4	Gary Chaw and his two finalists (Isaac Ong 翁奕杰 & Lim Wen Suen 林文荪)	"刮目相看"
14.5	Sky Wu and his two finalists (Becky Yeung 杨碧琪 & Yao Wong 黄欣瑶)	"情网"

== Elimination chart ==
=== Overall ===
Color key

Artist's info

- Team Hanjin
- Team Della
- Team Gary
- Team Sky

Result details

- Winner
- Runner-up
- Saved by the public
- Saved by his/her coach
- Eliminated

Live show results per week
Artist	Week 1	Finals	
Artist	Week 1	Round 1	Round 2
Lim Wen Suen 林文荪	Safe	Safe	Winner
Kenny Low 刘国辉	Safe	Safe	Runner-up
Annabella Chua 蔡咏琪	Safe	Eliminated	Eliminated (Finals Round 1)
Becky Yeung 杨碧琪	Safe	Eliminated	Eliminated (Finals Round 1)
Cherelle Tan 陈宣清	Safe	Eliminated	Eliminated (Finals Round 1)
Daniel Sher 丹尼尔	Safe	Eliminated	Eliminated (Finals Round 1)
Isaac Ong 翁奕杰	Safe	Eliminated	Eliminated (Finals Round 1)
Yao Wong 黄欣瑶	Safe	Eliminated	Eliminated (Finals Round 1)
An Hung Lin 闇鸿麟	Eliminated	Eliminated (Week 1)	
Daniel Lim 林峻民	Eliminated	Eliminated (Week 1)	
Izen Kong 龚杰尉	Eliminated	Eliminated (Week 1)	
Lin Jia Han 林珈含	Eliminated	Eliminated (Week 1)	
Nick Kung 龚建华	Eliminated	Eliminated (Week 1)	
Suzanne Low 刘思延	Eliminated	Eliminated (Week 1)	
Zhang Minhua 张旻华 & Alfred Sng 孙英豪	Eliminated	Eliminated (Week 1)	
Zoey Hui 许美琦	Eliminated	Eliminated (Week 1)	

=== Team ===
Color key

Artist's info

- Team Hanjin
- Team Della
- Team Gary
- Team Sky

Results details

- Winner
- Runner-up
- Eliminated

Artist	Week 1	Finals	
Artist	Week 1	Round 1	Round 2
Kenny Low 刘国辉	Public's choice	Advanced	Runner-up
Daniel Sher 丹尼尔	Coach's choice	Eliminated	
Nick Kung 龚建华	Eliminated		
An Hung Lin 闇鸿麟	Eliminated		
Annabella Chua 蔡咏琪	Public's choice	Eliminated	
Cherelle Tan 陈宣清	Coach's choice	Eliminated	
Zhang Minhua 张旻华 & Alfred Sng 孙英豪	Eliminated		
Izen Kong 龚杰尉	Eliminated		
Lim Wen Suen 林文荪	Public's choice	Advanced	Winner
Isaac Ong 翁奕杰	Coach's choice	Eliminated	
Lin Jia Han 林珈含	Eliminated		
Daniel Lim 林峻民	Eliminated		
Yao Wong 黄欣瑶	Public's choice	Eliminated	
Becky Yeung 杨碧琪	Coach's choice	Eliminated	
Zoey Hui 许美琦	Eliminated		
Suzanne Low 刘思延	Eliminated		

== Artists' appearances on other talent shows ==
- Rax Teh, Nick Kung, Daniel Sher, and Eugene Wen were a contestant on 2013, 2014, 2015 and 2016 of Astro Star Quest, and finished in second, sixth, second, and fourth place respectively.
- Vivian Chua was a contestant on the seventh season of One Million Star, where she was eliminated in the Top 16.
- Eugene Wen and Ape Kao appeared on the first season and the second season of Chinese Million Star as a challenger in the Challenging Round respectively.
- Eugene Wen and Rax Teh appeared on the second season and the third season of Chinese Million Star, and finished in the Top 29 and seventh place respectively.
- Jay Chen and An Hung Lin were a contestant on the first season of Million Star, and finished in seventh and eighth place respectively.
- Zhang Minhua appeared on the first season of Super Star, and finished in stage 13.
- Suzanne Low, Annabella Chua, Eli Low (from Only), and Nick Kung later appeared on the third season of Sing! China:
  - Nick Kung did not score a chair turn and was eliminated in the blind audition. His audition was not broadcast on television.
  - Eli Low received a four chair turn and joining Team Jay Chou, but later was eliminated in the sing-off round.
  - Annabella Chua received a three chair turn and joining Team Jay Chou, but later has been withdrawn the competition due to the new rules set out by the State Administration of Radio and Television which ban individuals below 18 years old from participating local television talent shows. Her audition video was edited out of broadcast on re-runs and video-streaming websites.
  - Suzanne Low received a two chair turn and joining Team Harlem Yu, but later was eliminated in the Cross Knockouts.
- Celine Wong later took part in Singapore's SPOP Sing! as one of top 20 finalists, and was eliminated in the semi-finals after losing the audience's vote.
- Annabella Chua later appeared on the fourth season of Sing! China, which received a one chair turn and joined Team Na Ying, but later was eliminated in the Cross Knockouts.
- Becky Yeung and Suzanne Low later took part in the second season of Jungle Voice, and were eliminated in the semifinals and episode 5 respectively.
- Alfred Sng (from Zhang Minhua & Alfred Sng) later appeared on the first season of Jungle Voice, and where eliminated in episode 5. After the show, he joined We Are Young as one of the 84 trainees, which finished in the 30th place.

== Extended links ==
- Official website
