= Infinity (Girl Next Door song) =

Single by Girl Next Door

from the album Next Future
- B-side: "If"
- Released: June 10, 2009 (Japan)
- Genre: J-Pop
- Label: Avex Trax

Girl Next Door singles chronology
"Seeds of Dream" (2009)	"Infinity" (2009)	"Be Your Wings/Friendship/Wait for You" (2009)

"Infinity" is the fifth single by the band Girl Next Door and it was released on June 10, 2009. Infinity was used as the theme song of Japanese drama Atashinchi no Danshi.

== CD Track listing ==
1. Infinity
2. If
3. Jōnetsu no Daishō (Diamond Mirror SCP Version)
4. Seeds of dream (Ice Cream Mix)
5. Infinity (Instrumental)

== DVD Track listing ==
1. Infinity (Music Video)

== Charts ==
Chart performance for "Infinity"
Chart (2009)	Peak position
Japan (Oricon)	1
Japan (Japan Hot 100)	3
