= Be Your Wings/Friendship/Wait for You =

Single by Girl Next Door

from the album Next Future
- Released: August 5, 2009 (Japan)
- Genre: J-pop
- Label: Avex Trax

Girl Next Door singles chronology
"Infinity" (2009)	"Be Your Wings/Friendship/Wait for You" (2009)	"Orion" (2009)

"Be Your Wings/Friendship/Wait for You" is the sixth single by the band Girl Next Door and was released on August 5, 2009. "Be Your Wings" was used as the theme song of PlayStation Portable game Tales of VS., "Friendship" was used as a Coca-Cola commercial song, and "Wait for You" was used as the theme song of NHK's broadcast of J-League.

== CD track listing ==
1. Be Your Wings
2. Friendship
3. Wait for You
4. Jōnetsu no Daishō (Ferry Corsten Remix)
5. Be Your Wings (instrumental)

== DVD track listing ==
1. Be Your Wings (music video)
2. Tales of VS. Opening Animation Movie

== Charts ==
=== Oricon Sales Chart ===
Release	Chart	Peak position	Debut sales	Sales total
August 5, 2009	Oricon Daily Singles Chart	3		
August 5, 2009	Oricon Weekly Singles Chart	4	22,801	34,354
August 5, 2009	Oricon Monthly Singles Chart	19		
August 5, 2009	Oricon Yearly Singles Chart	191		

=== Billboard Japan ===
Release	Chart	Peak position
September 3, 2008	Billboard Japan Hot 100	7
September 3, 2008	Billboard Japan Hot Singles Sales	6
