= Freedom (Girl Next Door song) =

Single by Girl Next Door
- B-side: "Sayonara"
- Released: June 16, 2010 (Japan)
- Genre: J-Pop
- Label: Avex Trax

Girl Next Door singles chronology
"Orion" (2009)	"Freedom" (2010)	"Ready to Be a Lady" (2010)

CD + DVD

"Freedom" is the eighth single by the band Girl Next Door and released by Avex Trax on June 16, 2010. "Freedom" is the theme song of the Japanese drama Jotei Kaoruko.

== CD Track listing ==
1. Freedom
2. "Sayonara" (サヨナラ)
3. Seeds of Dream (Blooming Remix)
4. Freedom (Instrumental)

== DVD Track listing ==
1. Freedom (Music Video)

== Charts ==
=== Oricon Sales Chart ===
Release	Chart	Peak position	Debut sales
June 16, 2010	Oricon Daily Singles Chart	4	
June 16, 2010	Oricon Weekly Singles Chart	9	8,858
