= Hub VV Drama =

Hub VV Drama HUB娛家戲劇台
- Country: Singapore
- Broadcast area: Nationwide
- Network: StarHub TV

Programming
- Picture format: HDTV 1080i SDTV 576i
- Timeshift service: VV Drama+3 娛家戲劇台+3

Ownership
- Owner: StarHub
- Sister channels: Astro Sensasi; Hub Sports Arena; Hub Sports; Hub E City; Hub Drama First

History
- Launched: 1 April 1992; 34 years ago
- Former names: VarietyVision (13 May 1992-31 May 1995); VarietyVision 1 (1 June 1995-31 May 2000); VV Drama (1 June 2000-31 December 2016)

Hub VV Drama (formerly known as VarietyVision) is a Singaporean Mandarin-language television channel owned by StarHub TV. Its programming consists solely of drama series from Hong Kong, China, South Korea and Taiwan, dubbed or subtitled into Chinese. There are no commercial breaks during programmes. Up until 28 July 2015, it also had a 3-hour timeshift channel on channel 856.

This channel is owned by StarHub TV, alongside Astro Sensasi, Hub Sports Arena, Hub Sports and Hub E City.

This channel celebrated its 20th anniversary to new timeslots including a new Japanese drama timeslot on Friday at 22:30 SST.

== History ==
VarietyVision launched on 13 May 1992 (pushed ahead from its prospective launch date of 1 June 1992). The channel initially broadcast eighteen hours a day every day of the week, except on Saturdays where it broadcast 24 hours. Content consisted of movies, documentaries, dramas and cartoons from suppliers from Taiwan, Hong Kong and mainland China.

== Commercial breaks ==
There are usually 1-minute commercial breaks in after the ending and before the beginning of each episode when 2 to 5 episodes of the same drama were broadcast back-to-back. Due to this scheme of not having commercial breaks during programmes, the show usually ends at about 45 minutes after the show has started to marks the end of the episode of each drama series, making the run of an episode faster than the typical one hour (60 minutes) including commercials.

== See also ==
- StarHub TV
- List of VV Drama dramas in 2013
