= Astro Star Quest =

- Astro新秀崛起吧 （aka. 新秀大赛）
- Genre: Singing Competition
- Country of origin: Malaysia

Production
- Production company: Astro

Original release
- Network: Astro Wah Lai Toi (1996-2016); Astro AEC (2025)
- Release: 1997

Astro Star Quest (Chinese: Astro新秀崛起吧), also formerly known as Astro Talent Quest and 新秀大赛 is an annual Chinese singing competition in Malaysia organized by Astro Wah Lai Toi and later Astro AEC, which was first held in 1997. The first winner in 1997 was 刘燕燕 Crystal and the most current winner in 2016 is 黄雯俐 Wengdyy. In 2017, it was temporary replaced by the Singapore-Malaysia version of 決戰好聲 The Voice and has since been went hiatus until 2025.

Due to the provisions of the competition contract, starting from 2005, the winner, 1st runner-up and 2nd runner-up will then represent Malaysia at the TVB全球华人新秀歌唱大賽 TVB International Chinese New Talent Singing Championship (from 1997 to 1999 and 2001, only the winner was sent to the competition. In 2000 and 2002 to 2004, the winner and 1st runner-up were sent out to the competition).

Astro Star Quest is one of the most popular Chinese singing competitions in Malaysia. In 2009, the organizers of the Astro Star Quest specially joined the "Creation Competition" for the first time. The "Best Original Song Award" not only realizes the dreams of emerging singers, but also discovers local emerging talents with creative talents, contributes to the promotion of local creations, and realizes the original dreams of local creators. "2009 Astro Star Quest Creative Group", the competition attracted nearly 2,000 submissions from all over Malaysia. After screening, the conference selected the top 5 talents to enter the top 10 competition of the Astro Star Quest. This second round of the Astro Star Quest successfully attracted public attention and response.

== Previous Award Winning Contestants ==
Year	Winner	1st Runner-Up	2nd Runner-Up	4th Place	5th Place	Other Awards
2016	黄雯俐 Wengdyy	周奕斌 Brian	陈建宏 William	尹景顺 Eugene	余筱慧 Steve	Most Popularity Award: 周奕斌 Brian
2015	邱诗凌 Apple	丹尼尔 Daniel	徐梦葹 Debbie	江卓权 Joesph	黄裔媁 Jacqueline	Media Recommendation Award: 江卓权 Joseph MY FM Most Popular Astro新秀 Single: 江卓权 Joseph -《野子》
2014	徐凱 Uriah	許益凱 Sean	李宜玲 Elaine	陈静宜 Yuli	彭世豪 Roe	My Favorite 新秀: 许益凯 Sean MY FM Across DJ Fully Recommendation Most Promising Astro新秀: 陈静宜 Yuli
2013	田育慈 Esther	王郑浚仁 Rax	吴宗翰 Justin	文小菲 Amy	黎桂金 Gean Lai	My Favorite 新秀: 吴宗翰 Justin
2012	赖淞凤 Nicole	陈雪芬 Chanice	叶美茜 Maxcy	许艾文 Ivyn	黄诗颖 Yyin	-
2011	颜慧萍 Geraldine	赵洁莹 Jie Ying	周艺培 Miko	黄立强 Licus	林长金 Kim	My Favorite 新秀: 赵洁莹 Jie Ying
2010	张诒博 Peace	刘佩芯 Stephanie	陈慧莹 Fyone	曾耀祖 Joe	颜伟伦 Alvin	My Favorite 新秀: 陈慧莹 Fyonne
2009	黄毓敏 Min	刘界辉 Kah Fai / Juztin	曾洁钰 Yoke	涂富祖 Ryan	钟瑾桦 Alvin	My Favorite 新秀: 刘界辉 Kah Fai / Juztin
2008	颜莞倩 WanChean	林淑晶 Debbie	朱浩仁 Haoren	许佳麟 Danny	张梦秦 Natalie	My Favorite 新秀: 朱浩仁 Haoren
2007	李政发 Zax	郑冰来 Wayne	陈晓燕 Christy	王翎蓓 Crystal	傅健颖 Jyin Poh	MY FM Internet Popularity Award: 李政发 Zax My Favorite 新秀: 陈晓燕 Christy
2006	郑伟康 Anthony	陳世安 Andrew	许慧珊 Echo	林智勇	董美玲	My Favorite 新秀: 郑伟康 Anthony 6th Place: 庄靖毅 Jym
2005	曾国辉 Tedd	符琼音 Meeia	刘洁琪			Best Talent Award: 刘洁琪
2004	吴国菲 Fayse	王明丽 Amy	叶咏鑫			Best Talent Award: 黄俊雄
2003	吴建亿 Kenny	洪韵诗	陈贻兴			Best Talent Award: 陈威全 VChuan
2002	张栋梁 Nicholas	张英胜 Vincent	杨爱芳			Best Talent Award: 叶朝明 Jack
2001	林健辉 Eric	黄慧仪	陈志刚			Best Talent Award: 陈玉芳
2000	何芸妮 Winnie	林凯璇	利慧君 Vivian			Best Talent Award: 彭慧玲
1999	李玉钦 Grace	马嘉轩 Athena	吴文聪	林忠彪 TP		Best Talent Award: 林忠彪 TP
1998	黎升铭 Christopher	陈雪兰	许文友 Thomas			Best Talent Award: 黎升铭 Christopher
1997	刘燕燕 Crystal	谢婉婷 Candy Cheah	梁佑诚 Dylan			

Note 1: There were 10 contestants in the finals from 1997 to 2005, the competition format was changed in 2006 with 6 in the finals, and 5 in the finals from 2007 to 2016.

Note 2: ( )The original name in brackets is the winner’s original name at the time of the competition, which has been changed.

== TVB International Chinese New Talent Singing Championship Record (Astro新秀) ==
Year	Winner	Award and Note	1st Runner-Up	Award and Note	2nd Runner-Up	Award and Note	4th Place	Award and Note	5th Place	Award and Note
2016	黄雯俐 Wengdyy	-	周奕斌 Brian	Gold Award	-		-		-	
2015	-		-		-		-		黄裔媁	Gold Award
2014	徐凱 Uriah See	Gold Award	-		李宜玲 Elaine	-	-		-	
2013			-		吴宗翰 Justin	Top 8	文小菲	Top 8	-	
2012			-		叶美茜 Maxcy	Top 8	-		-	
2011					周艺培 Miko	Top 8	黄立强	Top 8	林长金	Top 8
2010	張詒博 Peace	1st Runner-Up	劉佩芯 Stephanie	3rd Runner-Up	陳慧瑩 Fyone	2nd Runner-Up	-		-	
2009	黄毓敏 Min	Top 4	劉界輝 Kah Fai	Top 8	曾潔鈺 Yoke	Gold Award (Golden Microphone Award) Perfect Tone Award	-		-	
2008	颜莞倩 WanChean	Top 10	林淑晶 Debbie	Top 10	朱浩仁（朱豪仁）	-	-		-	
2007	李政发 Zax	Top 10	郑冰来 Wayne	-	陈晓燕 Christy	Top 10 Trendy Image Award	-		-	
2006	郑伟康 Anthony	SMS Popularity Award	陳世安 Andrew	Gold Award (Golden Microphone Award)	许慧珊	-	-		-	
2005	曾国珲 Tate (曾国辉 Tedd)	Top 4	符琼音 Meeia	Silver Award Perfect Tone Award	刘洁琪	-	-			
2004	吳國菲 Fayse	Silver Award	王明麗	Gold Award	-		-		-	
2003	吳建億 Kenny	-	洪韵诗	-	-		-		-	
2002	张栋梁 Nicholas	-	张英胜 Vincent	-	-		-		-	
2001	林健辉 Eric	-	-		-		-		-	
2000	何芸妮 Winnie	Bronze Award	林凯璇	Silver Award Best Stage Performance Award Best Potential Newcomer Award	-		-		-	
1999	李玉钦 Grace	Silver Award	-		-		-		-	
1998	黎升铭 Christopher	-	-		-		-		-	
1997	刘燕燕 Crystal	-	-		-		-		-	

== Other contestants/Other activities ==
Year	Name	Activities Participated	Award and Note
2016	尹景顺	2012 Chinese Million Star (Season 2)	Top 29
2016	周奕斌 Brian	2008 Astro International Hua Hee Karaoke	Winner
2015	黄裔媁	2009 Astro International Hua Hee Karaoke	1st Runner-Up
2015	黄裔媁	2009 Global Hokkien Song Composition and Singing Competition	8th Place (Global)
2015	黄裔媁	2011 Oriental Goddess Teresa Teng Global Competition	Winner (Malaysia Region)
2015	江卓权	2014 POP STAR	1st Runner-Up & SMS Most Popularity Award
2015	江卓权	2015 Top Million Star (Taiwan Program)	Top 24
2015	徐夢葹 Debbie	2015 Top Million Star (Taiwan Program)	Top 50
2015	邱诗凌 Apple	2008 Project Superstar (Malaysia) Season 3	Top 24
2015	邱诗凌 Apple	2014 The Ultimate Song	6th Place
2015	邱诗凌 Apple	2015 Top Million Star (Taiwan Program)	5th Place
2014	陈静宜	2011 Patriotic Song Singing Competition Inter Universities	Winner & Best Vocalist Award
2014	陈静宜	2015 Top Million Star (Taiwan Program)	Top 50
2014	許益凱 Sean	2015 Top Million Star (Taiwan Program)	Top 50
2014	徐凱 Uriah	2009 Opera Competition (Sim Cup) under 15 age	Winner
2014	徐凱 Uriah	2010 Opera Competition (Sim Cup) under 15 age	Winner
2013	黎桂金	2013 Chinese Million Star (Season 3)	Top 16
2013	文小菲	2011 Ultimate Power Star	2nd Runner-Up
2013	文小菲	2013 Chinese Million Star (Season 3)	Top 32
2013	文小菲	2014 Chinese Idol (Season 2)	Top 30
2013	吴宗翰 Justin	2011 Pop Star 2011	1st Runner-Up
2013	吴宗翰 Justin	2013 Chinese Million Star (Season 3)	Top 25
2013	王郑浚仁 Rax	2009 Pop Star 2009	Winner
2013	王郑浚仁 Rax	2013 Chinese Million Star (Season 3)	7th Place
2013	田育慈 Esther	2013 Chinese Million Star (Season 3)	6th Place
2012	黄诗颖	2011 Pop Star 2011	3rd Runner-Up
2012	黄诗颖	2012 Chinese Million Star (Season 2)	Top 18
2012	许艾文	2012 Chinese Million Star (Season 2)	8th Place
2012	叶美茜 Maxcy	2012 Chinese Million Star (Season 2)	Top 66
2012	陈雪芬 Chanice	2011 Global Hokkien Song Composition and Singing Competition	Top 10
2012	陈雪芬 Chanice	2012 Chinese Million Star (Season 2)	5th Place
2012	赖淞凤 Nicole	2008 Project Superstar (Malaysia) Season 3	Female's Team 1st Runner-up
2012	赖淞凤 Nicole	2012 Chinese Million Star (Season 2)	2nd Runner-up & Most Popular Award
2011	林长金	2011 Chinese Million Star (Season 1)	Top 40
2011	黄立强	2011 Chinese Million Star (Season 1)	Top 19
2011	周艺培 Miko	2011 Chinese Million Star (Season 1)	Top 20
2011	赵洁莹 Jie Ying Tha	2011 Chinese Million Star (Season 1)	2nd Runner-up & Most Popular Award
2011	颜慧萍 Geraldine	2011 Chinese Million Star (Season 1)	5th Place
2008	李佳薇 Jess	2011 One Million Star (Season 7)	Winner
2008	傅健颖	2004 Who Will Win THE MALAYSIAN TOPSTAR	2nd Runner-Up
2007	王翎蓓	2011 Chinese Million Star (Season 1)	Top 10
2005	符琼音 Meeia	2009 Super Idol (Season 2)	1st Runner-Up
2005	曾国珲 Tate (曾国辉 Tedd)	2023 Astro Classic Golden Melodies 2023	Winner
2004	许亮宇 (许俾文) Henley	2007 Project Superstar (Malaysia) Season 2	Winner Male's Team Winner
2003	郑综宪	2012 Astro International Hua Hee Karaoke	2nd Runner-Up
2003	郑综宪	2017 Hua Hee Mega Stars	Winner
2003	郑综宪	2021 Astro Classic Golden Melodies 2021	Winner
2003	洪韵诗	2004 Who Will Win THE MALAYSIAN TOPSTAR	Winner
2002	叶朝明	2007 Project Superstar (Malaysia) Season 2	Top 8
2001	尤诗君	2011 Chinese Million Star (Season 1)	100 People Primary Selection
2000	利慧君	2018 Astro Classic Golden Melodies 2018	Top 8 National (Integrated)
1999	李玉钦 Grace	2011 Global Hokkien Song Composition and Singing Competition	Winner
1999	李玉钦 Grace	2017 The Voice (Season 1)	Blind Audition
1999	李玉钦 Grace	2019 Astro Classic Golden Melodies 2019	Winner
1998	吳國豪	2016 Astro Classic Golden Melodies 2016	Final Top 8

Note 1: Astro collaborated with the most prominent in the world of Chinese music One Million Star. Starting from 2011, the top five contestants will be directly advanced to Taiwan's Chinese Million Star 100-person preliminary round

== Notable Contestants ==
While many talents have been shown through this competition, it also has many contestants who have gone on to become successful artists in their own right.

Notable abroadexamples would be Gary Chaw (1999 Finalist), Nicholas Teo (2002 Winner), 陈威全 VChuan Chen (2003 Finalist), Andrew Tan (2006 1st Runner-Up), Jess Lee (2008 Contestant) and 張詒博 Peace (2010 Winner).

Notable local (Malaysia) examples would be Eric Lim (2001 Winner), 朱浩仁（朱豪仁) (2008 2nd Runner-Up) 许佳麟 Danny (2008 Top 5), 曾潔鈺 Yoke (2009 2nd Runner-Up), 颜慧萍 Geraldine (Winner 2011) and 赖淞凤 Nicole (Winner 2012).

Notable local (Malaysia) that crossed to other languages entertainment industry examples would be Vincent Chong (2002 1st Runner-Up), 许亮宇 Henley Hii (2004 Contestant) and 钟瑾桦 Alvin Chong (2009 Top 5).

Notable local (Malaysia) radio DJs that were or currently still are examples would be 叶朝明 Jack Yap (2002 Finalist), 庄靖毅 Jym Chong (2006 Finalist), 曾耀祖 Joe Chang (2010 Top 5) and Jie Ying Tha (2011 1st Runner-Up).

== Competition Requirements ==
This competition is aimed at showcasing and unearthing talents among young Malaysian between ages 18 to 28 (age upper limit varies over the years) who are able to converse in Mandarin or Cantonese.

The competition started with audition where it is also open to all former finalists of Astro Talent Quest & Astro Star Quest (except former winners). The contestant must not be a recording artiste where he/she has released or in the process of releasing any solo and/or group album after the age of 12 years; or has intention to release a solo and/or group album within six months from the date of the finals of the contest;

For the first round of audition,

(Requirements differs over the years)

The contestant has to sing a song in any language or any Chinese dialects with a minimum duration of 90 seconds recorded into a video clip format for competition entry.

OR

The Contestant must sing from a selection of Chinese/Mandarin pop songs. The contestants have to perform a song with no instrumental accompaniment.

Selected contestants will enter the second round audition.

For the second round of audition, the contestant then must prepare his/her own CD/VCD/DVD minus one version containing the selected songs (one fast and one slow number) to be performed and will be judged before qualifying for the next round of competition. The contestants are required to use their own costumes and make-up as well.

== Competition Format ==
In the initial format, the final ten contestants are selected by judges who will battle it out for the title on one night performing one song and a talent time performance each. The top three will then be chosen by a panel of judges, where after they would be subjected to a series of tests which assesses various aspects of their vocal and singing ability, such as vocal range, musical timing, vocal flexibility to adapt to different music styles, etc. The judges then determine the winner, first runner-up and second runner-up. The talent time performance was eliminated as of year 2005.

As of 2006, with the change of name from Astro Talent Quest to Astro Star Quest a new format was introduced whereby all contestants would go through vocal, body gesture, hosting, speech management and dance trainings in addition to other challenges along the way to reach the finals with 6 contestants. The following year in 2007 onward, the finals narrowed to 5 contestants instead. Although SMS voting was introduced (for the popularity award), the judges still held absolute decision in the contestants' fate.

From year 2008 onward, the contestants were facing more challenges with the introduction of a "Player Kill" (PK) session among the contestants, with past winners, secondary school students or stars.

In 2011 onward, Astro collaborated with CTV (China Television Company, Ltd) where top 5 finalist will then represent Malaysia at the 華人星光大道 Chinese Million Star. Contestants were sponsored for their flight ticket to Taiwan.

The competition reaches its 20th anniversary in 2016 with the Final happening in the New Year's Eve on 31 December 2016 at Desa Park City. This particular year, the contestants were required to produce MTV as one of the competition segments. In the MTV production, the contestants were obligated to cover the selected songs with new improvisation (music arrangement improvisation) and different interpretation, with an aim in their unique portrayal as a new artist.

== Guest Judges and Artistes ==
Guest judges and artistes are invited every year including Eric Moo, Wang LeeHom, Jay Chou, Jordan Chan, Tension, F.I.R., JJ Lin, S.H.E, Rynn Lim, Janice Vidal and Yoga Lin.

The competition also judged by some renowned music industry personalities namely 李伟菘 Lee Wei Shiong from Singapore and Malaysian music producer Alex San.

Year	Artist
2016	Past Winners
2015	
2014	
2013	
2012	
2011	
2010	Yoga Lin
2009	Janice Vidal
2008	Zax Lee, Eric Lim
2007	S.H.E, Rynn Lim, Kenny Koh, Andrew Tan
2006	Kenny Koh, Nicholas Teo, Eric Lim
2005	
2004	F.I.R, JJ Lin, Kenny Koh
2003	Tension, Nicholas Teo, Z-Chen
2002	Jordan Chan, Eric Lim
2001	Jay Chou
2000	熊天平 Panda Hsiung, Chi Hsiao Chun, Island
1999	Wang LeeHom
1998	
1997	Eric Moo

== Notable incidents ==
=== 2025 edition: Astro Star Quest 2025 ===
During the first episode, contestant Ma Haoyi noticed that two other contestants, Peng Yuxin and Peng Yijun, shared the same surname and were unusually close. Upon asking, he found out they were biological siblings. The discovery surprised many, with host Ye Xiao'en later laughing, "I initially thought they were a couple."

== See also ==
- TVB全球华人新秀歌唱大賽
- Astro經典名曲歌唱大賽
