= Pink Tank (disambiguation) =

Pink Tank is the controversially painted post–World War II monument to Soviet tank crews in the Czech Republic.

Pink Tank may also refer to:

- Project Pink Tank by Rubicon Foundation
- Pink Tank Café Bar, The Public, West Bromwich, England
- Flying Pink Tank, a nickname of Japanese wrestler Yutaka Yoshie
- Pink Tank, a nickname of Taiwan-based Malaysian singer Meeia Foo
