= Untouchable (Japanese TV series) =

- アンタッチャブル〜事件記者・鳴海遼子〜
- Genre: Mystery; Comedy
- Screenplay by: Hiroshi Hashimoto
- Directed by: Ten Shimoyama; Akihiro Karaki; Jōta Tsunehiro
- Starring: Yukie Nakama; Jun Kaname; Tomohito Sato; Sei Ashina; Yoshimasa Tsujitani; Kazumi Urano; Yōji Tanaka; Toshiya Sakai; Yukiyoshi Ozawa; Tetsushi Tanaka; Susumu Terajima
- Music by: Akio Izutsu
- Ending theme: "Orion" by Girl Next Door
- Country of origin: Japan
- Original language: Japanese
- No. of seasons: 1
- No. of episodes: 9

Production
- Producers: Kiyoshi Kuwada; Yokochi Ikue; Yasui Kazunari; Ōta Masaharu
- Running time: 54 minutes
- Production companies: Asahi Broadcasting Corporation, All-Nippon News Network

Original release
- Release: October 16 – December 18, 2009

Untouchable (Japanese: アンタッチャブル〜事件記者・鳴海遼子〜, Hepburn: Antatchaburu Jiken Kisha Narumi Ryōko) is a TV series that was aired in Japan in 2009. It is a co-production between Asahi Broadcasting Corporation and All-Nippon News Network.

== Synopsis ==
Reporter Narumi Ryoko loses her job at a first-rate publisher and ends up at a trashy tabloid called "Shūkan Untouchable". She now chases celebrity scandals and sensational stories, but she hasn't lost her sense of duty or her persistence. While investigating her stories, she tends to notice details that imply some hidden truth beneath the surface, leading her to probe deeper into dangerous secrets.

== Cast and characters ==
- Yukie Nakama as Narumi Ryōko
- Jun Kaname as Toyama Shiro
- Tomohito Sato as Takafuji Shinichi
- Sei Ashina as Makise Misuzu
- Kazumi Urano as Nishio Rika
- Yoshimasa Tsujitani as Katayama Tamotsu
- Yōji Tanaka as Nakahara Makoto
- Toshiya Sakai as Jonouchi Hitoshi
- Yukiyoshi Ozawa as Narumi Koji
- Tetsushi Tanaka as Kashimura Hideaki
- Susumu Terajima as Nagakura Eiichi

== Guests ==
- Asano Yuko as Arisugawa Sumire (ep1)
- Mitsuishi Ken as Saionji Wataru (ep1)
- Sasai Eisuke (ep1)
- Nishida Ken (ep1)
- Kyomoto Masaki as Akutagawa Haruhiko (ep2)
- Aijima Kazuyuki as Natsume Ryudo (ep2)
- Wakaba Ryuya as Yoshiyuki Shusaku (ep2)
- Fukuda Moe (福田萌) as Dazai Hitomi (ep2)
- Takahashi Hitomi as Katsuragi Michiru (ep3)
- Ono Mayumi as Anna Tsubomi (ep3)
- Takigawa Hanako (多岐川華子) as Anna Sakura (ep3)
- Musaka Naomasa as Kishikawa Daigoro (ep3)
- Harada Ryuji as Sugawara Akimitsu (ep4)
- Uchida Asahi as Amamiya Sho (ep4)
- Kokubu Sachiko as Koike Shizuku (ep4)
- Kaneko Sayaka as Ayuhara Miku (ep4)
- Jinbo Satoshi as Producer Minato (ep4)
- Yamada Meikyo as Miyajima Nobumasa (ep4)
- Nakamura Shido as Kusuda Makoto (ep5)
- Miura Rieko as Martha (ep5)
- Inoue Masahiro (井上正大) as Takagi Ken (ep5)
- Matsumoto Wakana as Minami Ayaka (ep5)
- Sakurai Atsuko as Ichijo Haruka (ep6)
- Hinagata Akiko as Ichijo Chinatsu (ep6)
- Shinsui Sansho as Toyama Ichiro (ep6)
- Kanayama Kazuhiko as Diet member Yabu (ep6)
- Kikuhara Yutaro (菊原祐太朗) as Diet member Kubozono (ep6)
- Kobayashi Susumu as Police executive officer (ep6)
- Nocchi (ノッチ) as Haruka's apartment manager (ep6)
- Choshu Koriki (長州小力) as Haruka's neighbor (ep6)
- Akai Plutonium (赤いプルトニウム) as Haruka's neighbor (ep6)
- Yamamura Michi (山村美智) as the reporter (ep6)
- Owada Shinya as Ushimaru Hidetomo (ep7)
- Kawakami Maiko as Hikawa Michiko (ep7)
- Anzu Sayuri as Yuki (ep7)
- Shimura Haruka (志村陽香) as Miki (ep7)
- Dandy Sakano (ダンディ坂野) as Dandy Nogami (ep7)
- Sawatari Minoru (佐渡稔) as Sena Shun (ep7)
- Ishii Kenichi as Bushizawa Keiichi (ep7)
- Oginome Keiko as Ejima Akari (ep8-9)
- Asano Kazuyuki as Inagaki Heihachi (ep8)
- Kakazu Issei as Aoi Shinichiro (ep8)
- Hasegawa Hatsunori as Okawa (ep9)
- Toma Sora (藤間宇宙) as Nashino Kohei (ep9)
