= Girl Next Door (Girl Next Door album) =

2008 album by Girl Next Door

Studio album by Girl Next Door
- Released: December 24, 2008
- Genre: J-Pop
- Label: Avex Trax

Girl Next Door chronology
Girl Next Door (2008)	Next Future (2010)

Normal Edition

Girl Next Door is the first album from Girl Next Door released on December 24, 2008. It was released in two versions, a Normal Edition and an Album+DVD version. Both versions had a first press which included a slipcase and one of two photobooks. For the first time in the world of music, all the songs included in this album are tie-up to the media such as drama series, television shows, or commercials.

The album is certified platinum by RIAJ for shipment of 250,000 copies.

== CD track list ==
1. Winter Game
  - FujiTV show Uchikuru!? ending theme
2. Drive Away
  - Toyota Technical Development commercial song
3. Power of Love
  - Tokyo Tower 50th Anniversary official song
4. Shiawase no Jōken (幸福の条件, The Condition of Happiness)
  - TBS show Osama no Branch October and November ending theme
5. Winter Mirage
  - NTV drama Heroes Season 2 theme song
6. Jōnetsu no Daishō (情熱の代償, The Compensation of the Pasion)
  - TVAsahi Drama Gira Gira theme song
7. Fine After Rain
  - NTV show NNN News Realtime Real Sports section theme song
8. Breath
  - TBS show Uwasa no! Tokyo Magazine ending theme
9. Day's...
  - NTV show NNN Straight News weather theme
10. Escape (Album Edit)
  - Toshiba cellphone W65T(au) commercial song
11. Winter Garden
  - TBS show Rank Okoku December and January ending theme
12. Climber's High
  - NTV show Guru Guru Ninety Nine ending theme
13. Next Door
  - Tokyo FM Akasaka Yasuhiko no Dear Friends ending theme
14. Gūzen no Kakuritsu (偶然の確率, Accidental Probability) (Album Edit)
  - TBS show CDTV opening theme
  - TBS show Osama no Branch August and September ending theme
  - TBS show Arabiki-dan August and September ending theme

== DVD track list ==
1. Gūzen no Kakuritsu (music video)
2. Drive Away (music video)
3. Jōnetsu no Daishō (music video)
4. Winter Game (music video)

== Charts ==
Chart	Peak position	Sales total
Oricon Daily Chart	1	
Oricon Weekly Chart	3	171,165
Oricon Monthly Chart	4	
Oricon Yearly Chart	35	
Oricon Total Sales		212,411

=== Singles ===
Date	Title	Peak position	Sales
September 3, 2008	"Gūzen no Kakuritsu"	3	58,137
October 8, 2008	"Drive Away/Shiawase no Jōken"	3	33,474
November 19, 2008	"Jōnetsu no Daishō/Escape"	3	30,884
