= Hub E City =

Hub E City HUB都会台
- Country: Singapore
- Broadcast area: Nationwide
- Network: StarHub TV

Programming
- Languages: Mandarin, Cantonese, Japanese, Korean
- Picture format: SDTV 576i HDTV 1080i
- Timeshift service: E City +2 都会台 +2

Ownership
- Owner: StarHub
- Sister channels: Astro Sensasi; Hub Sports Arena; Hub Sports; VV Drama; Hub Drama First

History
- Launched: 1 June 1995; 31 years ago (Singapore)
- Replaced: HUB E City (2017-Present)
- Former names: VarietyVision 2 (1995-2000); VV Entertainment (2000-2003); E City (2003-2016)

Hub E City is a cable television StarHub TV channel 825 which belongs to StarHub. Its programming consists solely of drama series and hot entertainment programmes from Taiwan, Japan and Korea, dubbed into Mandarin for dramas (variety shows remain Korean) and also airs highly rated Taiwanese variety shows presented by popular hosts. There are commercial breaks during programmes on every 30 minutes. StarHub CableTV's channel 826 is E City +2 channel, showing programmes they air 2 hours before at a 2-hour later timeslot, which is still under the Chinese Entertainment Basic Group together with its Start Over and Catch Up TV buttons. Now StarHub also has added StarHub CableTV's channel 111, a simulcast of E City channel 825. Initially both of them are complimentary only on for one and a half years from 25 April 2011 to 31 December 2012, however, the complimentary viewing extended for two more years, which ends on 31 December 2014

The channel is a Homemade Theme channel by StarHub TV, along with HUB VV Drama (including On Demand), HUB Sports (4 different numbered channels, as well as HUB Sports Arena), HUB Sensasi, HUB Dunia Sinema On Demand, HUB Ru Yi Hokkien On Demand and HUB Varnam VOD.

In February 2012, for a period of 7 weeks, E City was the broadcaster of the Mandarin version of Fairprice Family Cook Off (S2). The English version was broadcast by the Asian Food Channel (Ch 435).

== See also ==
- StarHub TV
- VV Drama
- Astro Sensasi
