= Seeds of Dream =

Single by Girl Next Door

from the album Next Future
- B-side: "Reasons for Tears"
- Released: April 15, 2009 (Japan)
- Genre: J-Pop
- Label: Avex Trax

Girl Next Door singles chronology
"Jōnetsu no Daishō/Escape" (2008)	"Seeds of Dream" (2009)	"Infinity" (2009)

"Seeds of Dream" is the fourth single by the band Girl Next Door and it was released on April 15, 2009. Seeds of Dream was used as the commercial song for Glico's Ice no Mi, while Reasons for Tears was used as a commercial song for Tokyo's 2016 Olympic-Paralympic bid.

== CD track listing ==
1. Seeds of Dream
2. Reasons for Tears
3. Gūzen no Kakuritsu (Oh My Gold Mix)
4. Escape (Ice Cream Mix)

== DVD track listing ==
1. Seeds of Dream (Music Video)

== Charts ==
=== Oricon sales chart ===
Release	Chart	Peak position	Debut sales	Sales total	Chart run
April 15, 2009	Oricon daily singles chart	2			
April 15, 2009	Oricon weekly singles chart	3	25,269	34,266	6 weeks
April 15, 2009	Oricon monthly singles chart	17			
April 15, 2009	Oricon yearly singles chart	193			

=== Billboard Japan ===
Release	Chart	Peak position
April 15, 2009	Billboard Japan Hot 100	3
April 15, 2009	Billboard Japan Hot Singles sales	4
