= Orion (Girl Next Door song) =

Single by Girl Next Door

from the album Next Future
- B-side: "Toki no Shizuku"
- Released: November 25, 2009 (Japan)
- Genre: J-Pop
- Label: Avex Trax
- Producer: Max Matsuura

Girl Next Door singles chronology
| "Be Your Wings/Friendship/Wait for You" (2009) | "Orion" (2009) | "Freedom" (2010) |

"Orion" is the seventh single by the band Girl Next Door and it was released on November 25, 2009. Orion was used as the theme song of Japanese ABC drama Untouchable.

== CD track listing ==
1. Orion
2. "Toki no Shizuku" (時の雫)
3. Drive Away (Gogo's Remix)
4. Orion (Instrumental)

== DVD track listing ==
1. Orion (Music Video: Monochrome Version)

== Charts ==
=== Oricon Sales Chart ===
| Release | Chart | Peak position | Debut sales | Sales total |
|---|---|---|---|---|
| November 25, 2009 | Oricon Daily Singles Chart | 8 | | |
| November 25, 2009 | Oricon Weekly Singles Chart | 9 | 16,338 | 22,993 |
| November 25, 2009 | Oricon Monthly Singles Chart | 39 | | |
| November 25, 2009 | Oricon Yearly Singles Chart | 315 | | |

=== Billboard Japan ===
| Release | Chart | Peak position |
|---|---|---|
| November 25, 2009 | Billboard Japan Hot 100 | 16 |
| November 25, 2009 | Billboard Japan Hot Singles Sales | 10 |
