= Meeia Foo =

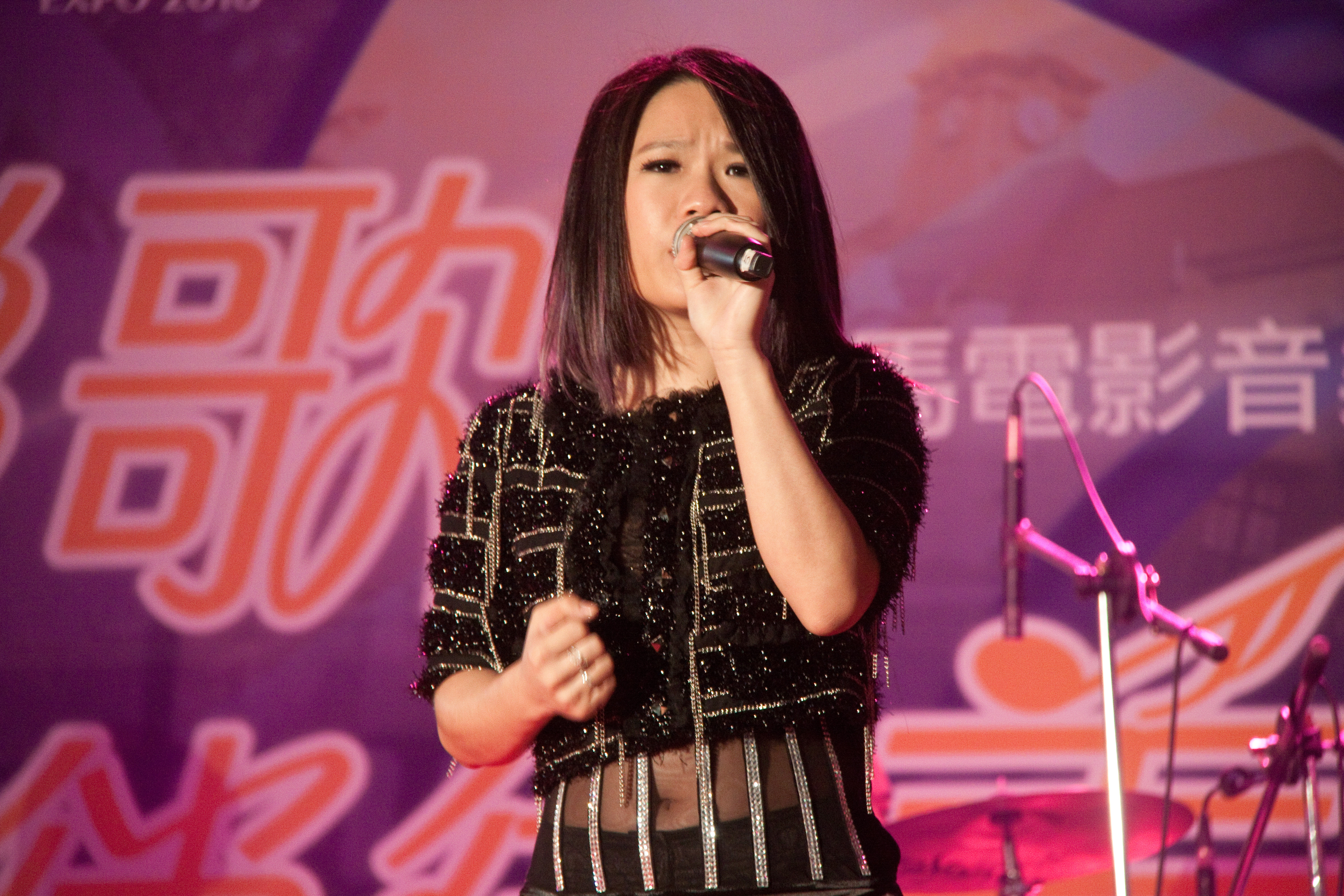
- Taiwan Railway Administration Hsinchu Station Square Golden Horse Film Concert, 2011
- Born: 11 February 1983 (age 43); Johor, Malaysia
- Occupation: Singer

Chinese name
- Traditional Chinese: 符瓊音
- Simplified Chinese: 符琼音
Transcriptions
Standard Mandarin
- Hanyu Pinyin: Fú Qióng-Yīn
Yue: Cantonese
- Jyutping: Fu4 King4 Jam1
Southern Min
- Hokkien POJ: Hû Khêng-im
- Tâi-lô: Hû Khîng-im
- Musical career
- Also known as: Pink Tank
- Origin: Malaysia
- Website: facebook.com/meeiafoo

Meeia Foo (simplified Chinese: 符琼音; traditional Chinese: 符瓊音; pinyin: Fú Qióng-Yīn; Jyutping: Fu4 King4 Jam1; Pe̍h-ōe-jī: Hû Khêng-im), is a Taiwan-based Malaysian singer who rose to fame after participating in "Super Idol" (超級偶像), a Taiwanese singing competition.

== Performances in main singing competitions ==
- 2004 Malaysian Idol I (大馬偶像I) – Top 33
- 2005 Astro Talent Quest/Astro Star Quest (Astro新秀大赛) – 1st runner-up
- 2005 TVB8 International Chinese New Talent Singing Championship (TVB8全球華人新秀歌唱大賽) – 1st runner-up, Perfect Tone Award
- 2008 Super Idol I (超級偶像I)
- 2009 Super Idol II (超級偶像II) - runner-up
- 2009 Super Idol III (超級偶像III)
- 2010 I Am The One (非同凡響)

=== 2004 Malaysian Idol Season 1 ~held in Malaysia ===
Date	Song	Results	Note
20040625#3	-	Advanced	Week 3: Johor Audition, Successful Candidates (15 persons)
20040709#5	-	Advanced	Theatre Elimination，Top 33 are born
20040730#8	Broken Vow／Lara Fabian	Failed	Top 33 – Group 3, advance to the Top 11. 8 people who are selected will be singing in the Wildcard Round on next week
20040806#9	Colors of The Wind／Vanessa Williams	Eliminated	The Wildcard Show,3 from 8 advanced to the Top 12

=== 2005 Astro Star Quest ~held in Malaysia ===
Date	Song	Results	Note
2005			
2005			

=== 2005 TVB8 International Chinese New Talent Singing Championship ~held in Hong Kong ===
Date	Song	Results	Note
20051022	-unknown-	61.46／70.00	20051016 Heat
20051023	Sui Ai Er Fei(隨愛而飛)／Cass Phang	advanced	
20051023	Hui Jia(回家)／Shunza	advanced	
20051023	Dai Ai Yi Cheng Wang Shi(當愛已成往事)／Sandy Lam	advanced	
20051023	Ling Wu(領悟)／Winnie Hsin, Bo Si Mao(波斯貓)/S.H.E, Jian Kang Ge(健康歌)／Mavis Fan, Xie Yi Shou Ge(寫一首歌)／Shunza	75／81	

=== 2008 Super Idol I ~held in Taiwan ===
Date	Song	Score	Note
20080503#28	Hui Jia(回家)／Shunza	44.2	
20080510#29	open your eyes／A-mei	43.6	

=== 2009 Super Idol II ~held in Taiwan ===
Date	Song	Score	Note
20080628#01	Ye Mang Zheng(夜盲症)／Tanya Chua	0light	Top 36 qualification，Pass！
20080726#05	Zhi Yuan Wei Ni Shou Zhe Yue(只願為你守著約)／Faye Wong	8.4	
20080809#07	Bao Hu Wo(保護我)／Penny Tai	8.6	My hit Song II，pass！
20080816#08	Yi Yan Shun Jian(一眼瞬間)／A-mei & Jam Hsiao	-	duet with Jam Hsiao
20080823#09	hero／Mariah Carey	8.5	Sing for My Love II，Pass！
20080830#10	Yi Yang De Yue Guang(一樣的月光)／Su Rui	8.7	
20080906#11	Liang Tiao Lu Shang(兩條路上)／Zhou Xuan	8.6	
20080913#12	Meng Zhong Ren(夢中人)／Faye Wong	8.4	tribute to idol
20080920#13	Tian Ya Ge Nv(天涯歌女)／Tsai Chin	8.5	Old song
20080927#14	Shuo Ni Ai Wo(說你愛我)／Sarah Chen	8.4	
#15	The Color of My Love／Celine Dion	8.6	My Love Story
#16	Qiao Qiao Wo De Tou(敲敲我的頭)／Julia Peng; Ou Ran(偶然)／Chelsia Chan	42.9; 42.1	
#17	What's up／4 Non Blondes	44.3	
#18	Saving all my love for you／Whitney Houston	43.5	
#19	You make me free／A-mei	42.6	
#20	All I ask of you／Barbra Streisand	42.9	
#21	Nan Ren Nv Ren(男人女人)／Valen Hsu&Amguulan		
#22	Memory／Barbra Streisand	43.4	
#23	An Shi(暗示)／Coco Lee	43.4	
#24	Jiu Gan Tang Mai Wu(酒矸徜賣無)／Su Rui	42.9	
#25	I will survive／Gloria Gaynor	43.8	
#26	Breakaway／Kelly Clarkson	43.0	
#27	lovin' you／Shanice	44.0	
#28	Duan Le Xian(斷了線)／Mindy Quah (柯以敏)	52.5	
#29	Mama mia／A-mei; Wei Ni Wo Shou Leng Feng Chui(為你我受冷風吹)／Sandy Lam	52.2; 52.2	
#30	Tian Ding De Yue Niang(天頂的月娘)／Christine Hsu(許景淳); Tian Xia Wu Shuang(天下無雙)、Whenever wherever／Jane Zhang、Shakira; Listen／Beyoncé	52.3; 51.8; 53.8	Grand Final
#31	San Tian San Ye(三天三夜)／A-mei	53.2	

=== 2009 Super Idol III ~held in Taiwan ===
Date	Song	Score	Note
20090620 #20	Hai Hai Ren Sheng(海海人生)／Chen Yingjie	43.1	
20090905 #31	All by myself／Celine Dion	44.0	
20091003 #35	Chui Chui Chui(追追追)／Huang Fei	44.2	

=== 2010 I Am The One ~held in Zhejiang, China ===
20100903	Song	Pro-judges	Audiences	Total	Note
1st round	Listen／Beyoncé	22:03	18:07	40:10	Win
2nd round	Jiu Gan Tang Mai Wu(酒矸徜賣無)／Su Rui	19:06	05:20	24:26	lose

== Discography ==
Released date Title	Label	Type	Tracks / Language / Additional Info
■ 2009-06-05; PINK JUKEBOX (粉紅點唱機)	Skyhigh	ALBUM – 1st	• Wo Shi Bu Shi Ni Zui Teng Ai De Ren (我是不是你最疼愛的人) / Mandarin / original artist: Michelle Pan (潘越雲); • Liu Bu Zhu De Gu Shi (留不住的故事) / Mandarin / original artist: Tracy Huang; • Jiu Gan Tang Mai Wu (酒矸倘賣無) / Mandarin / original artist: Su Rui; • Shi qu De Ai (逝去的愛) / Mandarin / original artist: Ouyangfeifei (歐陽菲菲); • Hai Hai Ren Sheng (海海人生) / Taiwanese / original artist: Chen Yingjie (陳盈潔); • Meng Xing Shi Fen (夢醒時分) / Mandarin / original artist: Sarah Chen; • Saving All My Love For You / English / original artist: Whitney Houston; • The Way We Were / English / original artist: Barbra Streisand; • Stupid Cupid (duet with Feng LingLing) / English / original artist: Connie Francis; • The Rose / English / original artist: Bette Midler; • Hero / English / original artist: Mariah Carey; • My Heart Will Go On / English / original artist: Celine Dion
■ 2010-12-17; TEARLESS (很久沒哭了)	Skyhigh	ALBUM – 2nd	• Zui Pa Leng Zhan (最怕冷戰) / Mandarin; • Hen Jiu Mei Ku Le (很久沒哭了) / Mandarin; • Bu Fu (不服) / Mandarin; • You Ni Cai Wan Zheng (有你才完整) / Mandarin; • Xi Huan Bu Shi Ai (喜歡不是愛) / Mandarin; • WAH WAH / Mandarin; • Bu Neng Deng (不能等) / Mandarin; • Wang Ji Wo (忘記我) / Mandarin; • Duan Chi De Hu Die (斷翅的蝴蝶 ) / Mandarin; • Xiao Sa Zou Yi Hui (瀟灑走一回) / Mandarin
■ 2010-01-15; CHIC	Skyhigh	EP – 1st	• Ai Wo Shuo Le Suan (愛 我說了算) / Mandarin; • Wei Jing (薇京) / Mandarin; • Hui Se Di Dai (灰色地帶) / Mandarin; • Star / English; • I Feel You / English; • Dreamers / English; • 58 °Ji Mo (58°寂寞) / Mandarin
■ 2009-03-06; I HAVE MY EXCLAMATION POINT ！ (我有我的驚嘆號！)	Skyhigh	COMPILATIONS	• Die Lian Hua (蝶戀花) / Mandarin
■ 2011-04-29; LOVE TOGETHER (愛讓我們在一起)	Skyhigh	SOUNDTRACK	• You Ni Cai Wan Zheng (有你才完整) / Mandarin / Theme Song; Lyrics:Yang Pei-an，Composer:Hsiao Huang Chi; • Zhu Jin Ni Xin Wo (住進你心窩)- Eison feat. Meeia Foo & Xie Junqi / Mandarin / Lyrics:Chen Le Rong(陳樂融), Composer：Chen Guo Hua (陳國華); • 58° Ji Mo (58°寂寞) / Mandarin / Lyrics: 劉虞瑞, Composer: Chris Wu (吳听徹)
■ 2010-01-05; EISON'S FANTASTIC WORLD – MACK DADDY (艾成的異想世界-萬人迷)	Skyhigh	OTHERS	• Zhu Jin Ni Xin Wo (住進你心窩) / Mandarin / 收錄在EISON'S EP 民視《新兵日記》插曲 民視《愛讓我們在一起》插曲 民視《夜市人生》插曲
■ 2006-12-30		OTHERS	• Guan Huai "Care" (關懷) / Mandarin / 曲-郑亿华 词-曾繁彬 编曲-EUGENE; Local singer help out in producing single song CD "Care" to show their support to all flood victims. This CD just for charity sales
■ 2007-06-06; VOIS	Two Formation	OTHERS	• Nian Shao Qing Kuang (年少輕狂) / Mandarin / Chan Kwok Fai feat. 林健輝 + Meeia Foo + 劉潔琪. 收錄在Chan Kwok Fai's ALBUM
■ 2009		OTHERS	• Rang Ai Zhuan Dong Yu Zhou (讓愛轉動整個宇宙) / Mandarin / （與50組藝人合唱）
■ 2009-07-30; LYRICISM (抒‧情)	Skyhigh	OTHERS	• You Ni You Ming Tian (有你有明天) / Mandarin / duet with Yang Pei-An 收錄在Yang Pei-AnEP 中視神鵰俠侶戲劇片頭曲）
■ 2010		OTHERS	• 蝴蝶花 花蝴蝶 / Mandarin / 大馬戲劇《碳鄉》片尾曲 入圍馬來西亞娛協獎最佳編曲獎
■ 2010		OTHERS	• 跨樂星光 / Mandarin / 2010娛協獎新人主題曲- 23組新人合唱

== Concert ==
- 2011 - Taiwan Railway Administration Hsinchu Station Square Golden Horse Film Concert

== Achievements & Awards ==
- 2005 Astro Talent Quest / Astro Star Quest(Astro Rookie Competition) – 1st runner-up
- 2005 TVB8 International Chinese New Talent Singing Championship (TVB8 Global Chinese New Talent Singing Competition) – 1st runner-up, Perfect Tone Award
