= Million Star =

- Hosted by: Sean Lin; Patty Wu
- Judges: Matilda Tao; Xiaoyu Sung; Winnie Hsin (week 1–4, 7–8); William So (week 1–4); Samingad (week 1–2); Kenji Wu (week 3–4); Lo Ta-yu (week 5–6); Steve Wong (week 5–6); Yuan Wei Jen (week 5–6); Richie Jen (week 7–8); Chan Ascent (week 7); Chief Chao (week 8); Khalil Fong (week 8); Edmond Leung (week 9-10); Pauline Lan (week 9-10); Grasshoppers (week 9-10)
- Winner: Che Zhili
- Runner-up: Song Chulin

Release
- Original network: Chinese Television System; STAR Chinese Channel; Star Entertainment Channel; Fox Taiwan; Coture; Yahoo! Taiwan; Astro Xi Yue HD; StarHub E City
- Original release: 15 August 2015 – present

The first season of Million Star (Chinese: 星光大道) is a Taiwanese reality talent show that is aired on Chinese Television System (CTS). The first episode was filmed on 2 July, and aired on 15 August 2015. This is Taiwan's first reality series to be aired across the globe (Taiwan, Hong Kong, China, Malaysia and Singapore). Viewers can use the Million Star mobile app to interact with the contestants and submit their predictions. The show premiered on 15 August 2015 on Taiwan's CTS, STAR Chinese Channel, Star Entertainment Channel, Fox Taiwan, Coture, Yahoo! Taiwan, Malaysia's Astro Xi Yue HD and Singapore's StarHub E City.

The show sponsor is Gamania.

== Judges and hosts ==
The show's hosts are Sean Lin, winner of the first season of Mimic King, and Patty Wu. Judges forming the judging panel include Matilda Tao, Xiaoyu Sung, Winnie Hsin, William So, Richie Jen, Steve Wong and Edmond Leung; while guest judges include Samingad, Kenji Wu, Chief Chao, Alan Tam, Jam Hsiao, Pauline Lan and Grasshoppers.

== Contestants ==
Colour key

- Winner
- Runner-up
- Third place
- Fourth place
- Fifth place
- Sixth place
- Eliminated in the Cumulative Rounds
- Eliminated in the Top 14 rounds
- Eliminated in the Top 18 rounds
- Eliminated in the Top 24 rounds

Top 24 contestants
Che Zhili 車志立	Song Chulin 宋楚琳	Jian Shuping 簡淑萍	Ren Longxin 任龍欣
Qiu Shiling 邱詩凌	Yang Shuxuan 楊淑萱	Chen Lanjie 陳藍杰	An Honglin 闇鴻麟
Lin Shixuan 林士軒	Chen Rui 陳銳	Chen Hongzhu 陳虹竹	Chen Jinghao 陳景皓
Wang Yanwei 王艷薇	Wang Zhihong 王志弘	Li Long 李龍	The Lighters 萊特姊弟
Ye Zuting 葉祖廷	Zhang Ruifei 張芮菲	Jiang Zhuoquan 江卓權	Wei Guoyuan 韋國元
Xie Bingyu 謝秉宇	Xu Junjie 徐俊傑	Zeng Yuchen 曾宇辰	Zheng Xingan 鄭幸安

== Blind auditions ==
The contestants will perform from behind a screen in the beginning. The screen will be lifted when one of the five judges has cast his or her vote, and the contestant is safe if he or she gets three or more votes. On the other hand, the contestant is immediately eliminated if the screen is not lifted. At the end of each episode, the judges will pick five contestants to advance into the top 24. In the end of week 4, the judges will choose four more contestants who were previously eliminated in the blind auditions to save into the top 24.

Colour key

- Advanced to the top 24
- Final PK round
- Chosen in the revival round
- 3 votes but did not advance
- Eliminated

=== Episode 1 (15 August) ===
Order	Contestant	Age	Hometown	Song	Judge's votes and choices				
Order	Contestant	Age	Hometown	Song	Samingad	William	Matilda	Winnie	Xiaoyu
1	You Hongming 尤鴻銘	30	Taichung	"我要我們在一起"	★	—	★	★	—
2	Xu Mengshi 徐夢葹	24	Malaysia	"被馴服的象"	—	★	★	★	—
3	An Honglin 闇鴻麟	24	Pingtung	"Mercy"	★	★	★	★	★
4	Unclean Face 臉不乾淨 (Gong Xiangwei 宮象瑋 & Xu Yaoqian 許耀謙)	21 / 19	New Taipei	"讓我一次愛個夠"	—	—	—	—	—
5	Lu Yuancheng 盧苑呈	22	Tamsui	"克卜勒"	—	—	—	—	—
6	Lin Shixuan 林士軒	24	Kaohsiung	"味道"	★	★	★	★	★
7	Chen Lanjie 陳藍杰	24	Yilan	"慢慢"	★	★	★	—	★
8	Li Yijun 李俋君	24	Kaohsiung	"P.S. 我愛你"	—	—	—	—	—
9	Jian Shuping 簡淑萍	22	Yingge	"我愛你"	—	—	★	—	—
10	Xu Yikai 許益凱	21	Malaysia	"陌生人"	—	—	—	—	—
11	Wei Guoyuan 韋國元	34	Taipei	"天高地厚"	★	★	★	—	—
12	Che Zhili 車志立	30	Malaysia	"如果雲知道"	★	★	—	★	★
Final PK round
1	You Hongming 尤鴻銘	30	Taichung	"愛是懷疑"	—	—	—	—	—
2	Wei Guoyuan 韋國元	34	Taipei	"黑色幽默"	★	★	★	★	★

=== Episode 2 (22 August) ===
Order	Contestant	Age	Hometown	Song	Judge's votes and choices				
Order	Contestant	Age	Hometown	Song	Samingad	William	Matilda	Winnie	Xiaoyu
1	Lü Chengcheng 呂程程	25	Shandong	"印第安老斑鳩"	—	—	—	—	—
2	Zhang Yuchang 張堉菖	26	Yilan	"離人"	—	★	—	—	—
3	Jiang Zhuoquan 江卓權	20	Malaysia	"最長的電影"	★	★	★	★	★
4	Huang Yanling 黃燕玲	22	Dominican Republic	"你不知道的事"	★	★	★	★	★
5	Xu Junjie 徐俊傑	22	Taipei	"流浪記"	★	—	—	—	—
6	Chen Jinghao 陳景皓	20	Chiayi	"我不知道愛是什麼"	★	—	★	—	—
7	Xie Minhua 謝旻樺	25	Taipei	"愛什麼稀罕"	—	—	—	—	—
8	Chen Pinhan 陳品涵	29	Taipei	"被遺忘的時光"	★	★	★	★	★
9	The Lighters 萊特姊弟 (Catherine Hu 胡斯華 & James Hu 胡斯漢)	30 / 25	Taipei	"Price Tag"	—	★	—	★	—
10	Li Long 李龍	22	Vietnam	"When I Was Your Man"	★	★	—	★	—
11	Wang Yanwei 王艷薇	21	Malaysia	"一個人" / "Bizarre Love Triangle"	★	★	—	★	★
12	Wang Zhihong 王志弘	22	Kaohsiung	"我很醜可是我很溫柔"	★	★	★	★	★
Final PK round
1	Huang Yanling 黃燕玲	22	Dominican Republic	—N/a	—	—	—	—	—
2	Chen Pinhan 陳品涵	29	Taipei	—N/a	—	—	—	—	★
3	Chen Jinghao 陳景皓	20	Chiayi	—N/a	★	★	★	—	—
4	The Lighters 萊特姊弟 (Catherine Hu 胡斯華 & James Hu 胡斯漢)	30 / 25	Taipei	—N/a	—	—	—	★	—

=== Episode 3 (29 August) ===
Order	Contestant	Age	Hometown	Song	Judge's votes and choices				
Order	Contestant	Age	Hometown	Song	Kenji	William	Matilda	Winnie	Xiaoyu
1	Xie Xiangyin 謝祥寅	20	Zhongli, Taoyuan	"兄妹"	—	—	★	—	—
2	Yi Weini 易薇倪	25	Singapore	"笑忘書"	—	—	—	—	—
3	Zheng Xingan 鄭幸安	27	Malaysia	"美麗"	★	★	★	★	—
4	Yan Junzhe 顏俊哲	35	Kenting	"袖手旁觀"	—	★	—	—	—
5	Luo Shiting 羅士庭	22	Taipei	"時間都去哪了"	—	★	★	—	★
6	Ye Zuting 葉祖廷	20	Taipei	"泡沫"	★	★	★	★	★
7	Zhang Shengzi 張聖子	23	Hualien	"最親愛的"	—	—	—	—	—
8	Chen Rui 陳銳	24	Taipei	"像夢一樣自由"	★	★	★	★	—
9	Chen Jingyi 陳靜宜	25	Malaysia	"獨角戲"	★	★	—	—	—
10	Liu Wen 劉雯	21	Wuhan, Hubei	"紅色高跟鞋"	—	—	—	—	★
11	Ren Longxin 任龍欣	21	Taipei	"All of Me"	★	★	★	★	★
12	Zeng Yuchen 曾宇辰	24	Hsinchu	"四季"	★	★	★	★	★
13	Zhang Ruifei 張芮菲	25	Pingtung	"我是一隻小小鳥"	★	★	★	★	—

=== Episode 4 (5 September) ===
Order	Contestant	Age	Hometown	Song	Judge's votes and choices				
Order	Contestant	Age	Hometown	Song	Kenji	William	Matilda	Winnie	Xiaoyu
1	Xie Bingyu 謝秉宇	20	Nantou	"夜夜夜夜"	—	★	★	★	★
2	Bai Chushan 白楚山	27	Puli, Nantou	"喜劇之王"	—	—	—	—	—
3	Chen Hongzhu 陳虹竹	26	Taipei	"光之翼"	★	★	—	—	★
4	Xie Bingyun 謝秉昀	23	Taipei	"可惜沒如果"	—	—	★	★	—
5	Zhu Jiaqi 朱佳祈	29	Hualien	"給我一個理由忘記"	—	—	—	—	—
6	Liu Xuefu 劉學甫	23	Hsinchu	"模特"	—	★	★	—	—
7	Liu Zhixuan 劉植軒	22	Chiayi	"內疚"	★	—	—	—	—
8	Song Chulin 宋楚琳	22	Kaohsiung	"魔鬼中的天使"	★	★	★	★	★
9	Wu Guanhong 吳冠宏	27	Taipei	"海嘯"	—	—	—	—	—
10	Liu Shanshan 劉姍姍	29	Xinjiang	"存在"	—	—	—	—	—
11	Yang Shuxuan 楊淑萱	23	Malaysia	"給我一個吻"	★	★	★	★	—
12	Qiu Shiling 邱詩凌	27	Malaysia	"身騎白馬"	★	★	★	★	★
13	Shi Siyu 史斯宇	20	Taichung	"是否我真的一無所有"	—	—	—	—	—
Revival round
1	Lü Chengcheng 呂程程	25	Shandong	—N/a	Not chosen				
2	Jian Shuping 簡淑萍	22	Yingge	—N/a	Chosen				
3	Xu Junjie 徐俊傑	22	Taipei	—N/a	Chosen				
4	Li Yijun 李俋君	24	Kaohsiung	—N/a	Not chosen				
5	Chen Pinhan 陳品涵	29	Taipei	—N/a	Not chosen				
6	Luo Shiting 羅士庭	22	Taipei	—N/a	Not chosen				
7	Zheng Xingan 鄭幸安	27	Malaysia	—N/a	Chosen				
8	The Lighters 萊特姊弟 (Catherine Hu 胡斯華 & James Hu 胡斯漢)	30 / 25	Taipei	—N/a	Chosen				

== Top 24 ==
In each episode, each of the six contestants to perform in the episode will select another contestant to battle against each other. In the event that there the contestant has no contenders, the contender will be selected randomly. After both contestants have performed their songs, the judges will decide who will be advanced based on the number of votes for the contestant (Team Red or Team Blue). After each episode, they will decide three eliminated contestants that will be saved among the six.

Episode	Order	Song	Team Red ★	Team Blue ★	Song	Judge's votes and choices				
Episode	Order	Song	Team Red ★	Team Blue ★	Song	John	Ta-yu	Matilda	Steve	Xiaoyu
Episode 5 (12 September)	1	"走在雨中"	Xu Junjie 徐俊傑	Chen Hongzhu 陳虹竹	"Revolution"	★	★	★	★	★
Episode 5 (12 September)	2	"迷路"	Jian Shuping 簡淑萍	Qiu Shiling 邱詩凌	"水災"	★	★	★	★	★
Episode 5 (12 September)	3	"吻別"	Wei Guoyuan 韋國元	Chen Jinghao 陳景皓	"長鏡頭"	★	★	★	★	★
Episode 5 (12 September)	4	"踮起腳尖愛"	Lin Shixuan 林士軒	Li Long 李龍	"Lost Stars"	★	★	★	★	★
Episode 5 (12 September)	5	"我懷念的"	Zeng Yuchen 曾宇辰	Chen Rui 陳銳	"擱淺"	★	★	★	★	★
Episode 5 (12 September)	6	"你的樣子"	Wang Zhihong 王志弘	Ye Zuting 葉祖廷	"讓"	★	★	★	★	★
Episode 6 (19 September)	1	"Sugar"	The Lighters 萊特姊弟	An Honglin 闇鴻麟	"不自由"	★	★	★	★	★
Episode 6 (19 September)	2	"夜空中最閃亮的星"	Zheng Xingan 鄭幸安	Che Zhili 車志立	"擁抱你"	★	★	★	★	★
Episode 6 (19 September)	3	"我等到花兒都謝了"	Xie Bingyu 謝秉宇	Ren Longxin 任龍欣	"漂著"	★	★	★	★	★
Episode 6 (19 September)	4	"終於說出口"	Zhang Ruifei 張芮菲	Song Chulin 宋楚琳	"走鋼索的人"	★	★	★	★	★
Episode 6 (19 September)	5	"辛德瑞拉"	Yang Shuxuan 楊淑萱	Chen Lanjie 陳藍杰	"我想我不會愛你"	★	★	★	★	★
Episode 6 (19 September)	6	"一個人還是想著一個人"	Wang Yanwei 王艷薇	Jiang Zhuoquan 江卓權	"那首歌"	★	★	★	★	★

== Top 18 – Cooperative Competition ==
The 18 contestants will be selected by the producers to be grouped into 9 pairs. After the contestants' performance, the judges will cast their votes. Both contestants will be advanced if they get three or more votes. At the end of the episode, the judges will select two potential contestants to be saved among the six eliminated.

Episode	Order	Contestants		Song	Judge's votes and choices				
Episode	Order	Contestants		Song	Ascent	Richie	Matilda	Winnie	Xiaoyu
Episode 7 (26 September)	1	Ye Zuting 葉祖廷	Che Zhili 車志立	"愛情不能作比較"	—	★	—	—	★
Episode 7 (26 September)	2	The Lighters 萊特姊弟	Li Long 李龍	"Say Something" / "A Thousand Years"	—	★	—	—	★
Episode 7 (26 September)	3	Chen Rui 陳銳	Chen Hongzhu 陳虹竹	"為你而活"	★	★	★	—	★
Episode 7 (26 September)	4	Chen Jinghao 陳景皓	Lin Shixuan 林士軒	"原點"	★	★	—	★	★
Episode 7 (26 September)	5	Wang Yanwei 王艷薇	Yang Shuxuan 楊淑萱	"閨蜜樂園"	★	★	★	★	★
Episode 7 (26 September)	6	Jian Shuping 簡淑萍	An Honglin 闇鴻麟	"鼓聲若響"	★	★	★	★	★
Episode 7 (26 September)	7	Qiu Shiling 邱詩凌	Chen Lanjie 陳藍杰	"春花夢露"	★	★	—	—	★
Episode 7 (26 September)	8	Ren Longxin 任龍欣	Song Chulin 宋楚琳	"Uptown Funk"	★	★	★	★	★
Episode 7 (26 September)	9	Wang Zhihong 王志弘	Zhang Ruifei 張芮菲	"血腥愛情故事"	—	★	—	—	★

== Top 14 – Oldies ==
The 14 contestants will select the oldie they want to perform. The song selected has to be the song that was performed around their birth. After each contestant's performance, the judges will cast their votes. The contestant will be advanced if he or she get three or more votes. At the end of the episode, the judges will select three potential contestants to be saved among the six eliminated.

The special guest for this episode is Khalil Fong.

Episode	Order	Contestant	Song	Year	Judge's votes and choices				
Episode	Order	Contestant	Song	Year	Richie	Chief	Matilda	Winnie	Xiaoyu
Episode 8 (3 October)	1	Wang Yanwei 王艷薇	"對你愛不完"	1993	★	—	—	—	—
Episode 8 (3 October)	2	Che Zhili 車志立	"每天愛你多一些"	1991	—	★	★	—	★
Episode 8 (3 October)	3	Lin Shixuan 林士軒	"心痛的感覺"	1984	★	★	★	★	—
Episode 8 (3 October)	4	An Honglin 闇鴻麟	"夜來香"	1978	★	—	—	—	★
Episode 8 (3 October)	5	Yang Shuxuan 楊淑萱	"原來的我"	1985	—	—	—	—	—
Episode 8 (3 October)	6	Chen Lanjie 陳藍杰	"鍾愛一生"	1998	★	★	★	★	★
Episode 8 (3 October)	7	Chen Rui 陳銳	"一場遊戲一場夢"	1987	★	★	—	★	—
Episode 8 (3 October)	8	Chen Jinghao 陳景皓	"Lemon Tree"	1995	—	—	—	—	—
Episode 8 (3 October)	9	Jian Shuping 簡淑萍	"桂花巷"	1987	★	—	—	—	★
Episode 8 (3 October)	10	Qiu Shiling 邱詩凌	"每次都想呼喊你的名字"	1984	★	★	★	★	★
Episode 8 (3 October)	11	Chen Hongzhu 陳虹竹	"Can't Take My Eyes Off You"	1967	—	★	—	★	—
Episode 8 (3 October)	12	Wang Zhihong 王志弘	"當愛已成往事"	1993	★	★	—	—	—
Episode 8 (3 October)	13	Ren Longxin 任龍欣	"秋意濃"	1993	★	★	—	★	★
Episode 8 (3 October)	14	Song Chulin 宋楚琳	"寂寞難耐"	1986	★	—	★	★	★

== Top 10 (Part 1) ==
The 10 contestants will choose their song to contest. After each contestant's performance, the judges will cast their votes. These votes will be carried over to the following week, where two contestants with the lowest number of votes at the end of two weeks will be eliminated. Grasshoppers occupy two tables and hence are entitled to two votes.

Episode	Order	Contestant	Song	Judge's votes and choices						Cumulative score
Episode	Order	Contestant	Song	Matilda	Pauline	Edmond	Xiaoyu	Grasshoppers		Cumulative score
Episode 9 (10 October)	1	Che Zhili 車志立	"When a Man Loves a Woman"	★	★	★	★	—	★	5
Episode 9 (10 October)	2	An Honglin 闇鴻麟	"你快樂所以我快樂"	★	—	—	—	—	★	2
Episode 9 (10 October)	3	Chen Rui 陳銳	"關不掉的月光"	—	—	—	—	—	—	0
Episode 9 (10 October)	4	Jian Shuping 簡淑萍	"晚安晚安"	★	★	★	★	★	★	6
Episode 9 (10 October)	5	Qiu Shiling 邱詩凌	"咕嘰咕嘰"	★	★	★	★	★	★	6
Episode 9 (10 October)	6	Lin Shixuan 林士軒	"我"	—	—	—	★	—	★	2
Episode 9 (10 October)	7	Yang Shuxuan 楊淑萱	"柵欄間隙偷窺你"	★	—	★	★	★	★	5
Episode 9 (10 October)	8	Song Chulin 宋楚琳	"女爵"	—	—	★	★	★	★	4
Episode 9 (10 October)	9	Chen Lanjie 陳藍杰	"沒離開過"	—	★	★	★	★	★	5
Episode 9 (10 October)	10	Ren Longxin 任龍欣	"煙味"	★	★	★	★	★	★	6

== Top 10 (Part 2) ==
Episode	Order	Contestant	Song	Judge's votes and choices						Score of last week	Total score
Episode	Order	Contestant	Song	Matilda	Pauline	Edmond	Xiaoyu	Grasshoppers		Score of last week	Total score
Episode 10 (17 October)	1	Chen Rui 陳銳	"My Anata"	★	★	★	★	★	★	0	6
Episode 10 (17 October)	2	An Honglin 闇鴻麟	"Rehab"	★	—	★	★	★	★	2	7
Episode 10 (17 October)	3	Song Chulin 宋楚琳	"Express"	★	★	★	★	★	★	4	10
Episode 10 (17 October)	4	Chen Lanjie 陳藍杰	"老派戀情"	★	★	★	★	★	★	5	11
Episode 10 (17 October)	5	Che Zhili 車志立	"飛機場的10:30"	★	★	★	★	★	★	5	11
Episode 10 (17 October)	6	Yang Shuxuan 楊淑萱	"But I Am a Good Girl"	★	★	★	★	★	★	5	11
Episode 10 (17 October)	7	Jian Shuping 簡淑萍	"浪費一整天"	—	★	—	—	★	—	6	8
Episode 10 (17 October)	8	Qiu Shiling 邱詩凌	"舞孃"	★	★	—	★	★	★	6	11
Episode 10 (17 October)	9	Ren Longxin 任龍欣	"有沒有"	★	★	—	★	★	—	6	10
Episode 10 (17 October)	10	Lin Shixuan 林士軒	"傷痕"	—	★	—	★	—	—	2	4

== Elimination chart ==
Contestant	Week 5	Week 6	Week 7	Week 8	Week 9	Week 10	Week 11	Week 12	Week 13
Che Zhili 車志立		Safe	Safe	Safe	Safe	Safe	Safe	Safe	Winner
Song Chulin 宋楚琳		Safe	Safe	Safe	Safe	Safe	Safe	Safe	Runner-up
Jian Shuping 簡淑萍	Safe		Safe	Safe	Safe	Safe	Safe	Safe	Third place
Ren Longxin 任龍欣		Safe	Safe	Safe	Safe	Safe	Safe	Safe	Fourth place
Qiu Shiling 邱詩凌	Safe		Safe	Safe	Safe	Safe	Safe	Safe	Fifth place
Yang Shuxuan 楊淑萱		Safe	Safe	Safe	Safe	Safe	Safe	Safe	Sixth place
Chen Lanjie 陳藍杰		Safe	Safe	Safe	Safe	Safe	Safe	Eliminated	Eliminated (Week 12)
An Honglin 闇鴻麟		Safe	Safe	Safe	Safe	Safe	Eliminated	Eliminated (Week 11)	
Lin Shixuan 林士軒	Safe		Safe	Safe	Safe	Eliminated	Eliminated (Week 10)		
Chen Rui 陳銳	Safe		Safe	Safe	Safe	Eliminated	Eliminated (Week 10)		
Chen Hongzhu 陳虹竹	Safe		Safe	Eliminated	Eliminated (Week 8)				
Chen Jinghao 陳景皓	Safe		Safe	Eliminated	Eliminated (Week 8)				
Wang Yanwei 王艷薇		Safe	Safe	Eliminated	Eliminated (Week 8)				
Wang Zhihong 王志弘	Safe		Safe	Eliminated	Eliminated (Week 8)				
Li Long 李龍	Safe		Eliminated	Eliminated (Week 7)					
The Lighters 萊特姊弟		Safe	Eliminated	Eliminated (Week 7)					
Ye Zuting 葉祖廷	Safe		Eliminated	Eliminated (Week 7)					
Zhang Ruifei 張芮菲		Safe	Eliminated	Eliminated (Week 7)					
Jiang Zhuoquan 江卓權		Eliminated	Eliminated (Week 6)						
Xie Bingyu 謝秉宇		Eliminated	Eliminated (Week 6)						
Zheng Xingan 鄭幸安		Eliminated	Eliminated (Week 6)						
Wei Guoyuan 韋國元	Eliminated	Eliminated (Week 5)							
Xu Junjie 徐俊傑	Eliminated	Eliminated (Week 5)							
Zeng Yuchen 曾宇辰	Eliminated	Eliminated (Week 5)							
