= Chan Kwok Fai =

Malaysian singer

Chan Kwok Fai 曾国珲
- Also known as: Tedd Chan
- Born: Chan Kwok Fai; June 18, 1982 (age 43)
- Origin: Ipoh, Malaysia (Hakka)
- Genres: Pop
- Occupation: Singer
- Labels: EMI
- Website: Official Website

Chan Kwok Fai, also known as Tedd Chan, (simplified Chinese: 曾国珲; traditional Chinese: 曾國琿; pinyin: Chèn Guóhuī; Jyutping: Can1 Gwok3 Wan4; Pha̍k-fa-sṳ: Chhìn Ket-fùn) is a Malaysian singer born in Ipoh, Malaysia. He is the winner of Astro Talent Quest 2005 and Astro Classic Golden Melodies 2023 (both are Malaysia Astro Singing Competitions).
