= Girl Next Door (band) =

Japanese pop musical trio

- Origin: Japan
- Genres: Pop; house; trance; rock; Eurobeat
- Years active: 2008–2013
- Label: Avex Trax
- Past members: Chisa; Daisuke Suzuki; Yuji Inoue
- Website: girlnextdoor.jp

Girl Next Door was a Japanese pop musical trio that debuted in 2008 on the Avex Trax label. The band consists of vocalist Chisa, guitarist Yuji Inoue and Daisuke Suzuki on keyboard. On September 3, 2013, the group's fifth anniversary, the band formally announced plans to dissolve Girl Next Door within the year. Their final performance as a group was held at SHIBUYA-AX on December 8, 2013.

== History ==
Girl Next Door was formed in March, and subsequently made their official debut in September 2008. Originally a dancer in the Kansai area, Chisa entered the Avex Artist Academy in 2005, and met Daisuke Suzuki (keyboardist) who was a respectable songwriter. Chisa and Suzuki recorded many demo tracks which eventually caught the eye of Avex CEO, Max Matsuura. Yuji Inoue(Guitarist) then joined the two, and Girl Next Door was formed and debuted with their 1st single: "Gūzen no Kakuritsu" (偶然の確率) in September 2008.

Chisa was born on November 16, 1985, and grew up in Hyōgo Prefecture. Her full name is Chisa Maekawa (前川 千紗). Girl Next Door's debut single, "Gūzen no Kakuritsu", was placed online on several sites from May 29, 2008. As of July 2008, there were two million views. Over a period of three months from their debut, they have released three singles. On December 24, 2008, they released their self-titled debut album including songs from the three singles. On December 22, 2008, the band's official fanclub "Next Door" opened.

The band's fifth single "Infinity" was released on June 10, 2009. It is also the theme song for the 2009 Spring TV show Atashinchi no Danshi and became their first No. 1 single on Oricon weekly single charts. They also sang the OP song of the game Tales of VS. using the song "Be Your Wings". The trio released their 6th single "Be Your Wings/Friendship/Wait for You" on August 5, 2009. It was their first triple A-side single.

On January 20, 2010, they released their second album Next Future including songs from the four singles and became their first No. 1 album with the first week sales of around 56,000 copies on Oricon weekly album charts.

== Discography ==
=== Singles ===
Release	Title	Oricon Singles Charts						Billboard Japan Charts			Legal Downloads (all formats)	Album
Release	Title	Peak Positions				Sales		Hot 100	Hot Airplay	Hot Singles	Legal Downloads (all formats)	Album
Release	Title	Daily	Weekly	Monthly	Yearly	Debut	Overall	Hot 100	Hot Airplay	Hot Singles	Legal Downloads (all formats)	Album
2008/09/03	"Gūzen no Kakuritsu" (偶然の確率))	3	3	17	125	31,025	58,137	1	1	1	-	Girl Next Door
2008/10/08	"Drive away/Shiawase no Jōken" (Drive away/幸福の条件)	3	3	18	218	21,081	33,474	1	1	1	-	Girl Next Door
2008/11/19	"Jōnetsu no Daishō/ESCAPE" (情熱の代償/ESCAPE)	1	3	21		25,117	30,884	1	1	1	-	Girl Next Door
2009/04/15	"Seeds of Dream"	2	3	17	193	25,269	34,266	1	1	1	-	Next Future
2009/06/10	"Infinity"	1	1	14	139	30,641	47,598	1	1	1	-	Next Future
2009/08/05	"Be your wings/FRIENDSHIP/Wait for you"	3	4	19	191	21,801	34,354	3	3	3	-	Next Future
2009/11/25	"Orion"	8	9	39	315	16,338	22,993	16	23	10	-	Next Future
2010/06/16	"Freedom"	4	9	48	-	8,858	12,015	18	23	12	-	Destination
2010/10/13	"Ready to Be a Lady"	6	8	34	-	9,138	12,972	11	14	11	-	Destination
2010/12/22	"Unmei no Shizuku ~Destiny's Star~/Hoshizora Keikaku" (運命のしずく~Destiny's star~/星空計画)"	4	7	48	462	9,386	13,487	10	35	11	-	Destination
2011/04/13	"Silent Scream"	12	15	48	-	5,716	7,056	19	19	16	-	Destination
2011/09/07	"Dadapara!!" (ダダパラ!!)	16	23	-	-	4,622	5,282	38	48	35	-	Agaruneku!
2011/10/19	"Rock Your Body"	19	21	-	-	-	4,286	73	93	28	-	Agaruneku!
2011/11/16	"Boogie-woogie Night" (ブギウギナイト)	22	33	-	-	2,883	3,328	76	-	42	-	Agaruneku!
2012/05/30	"Signal"	17	31	-	-	3,211	3,600	90	-	-	-	Life of Sound
2012/09/19	"All My Life"	18	40	-	-	1,560	-	-	-	59	-	Life of Sound
2013/02/27	"Standing for You"			-	-		-	-				Life of Sound

=== Albums ===
Release	Title	Oricon Singles Charts						Legal Downloads (all formats)
Release	Title	Peak Positions				Sales		Legal Downloads (all formats)
Release	Title	Daily	Weekly	Monthly	Yearly	Debut	Overall	Legal Downloads (all formats)
2008/12/24	Girl Next Door	1	3	3	35	171,165	212,844	
2010/01/20	Next Future	1	1	5	90	56,436	91,138	
2011/04/27	Destination	3	5	29	263	16,393	24,545	
2011/12/28	Agaruneku!	9	19	-	-	5,523	8,271	
2012/03/07	Single Collection	13	26	-	-	4,156	4,156	
2013/03/13	Life of Sound	-	-	-	-	-	-	
