= Drive Away/Shiawase no Jōken =

Single by Girl Next Door

from the album Girl Next Door
- Released: October 8, 2008
- Genre: J-Pop
- Label: Avex Trax

Girl Next Door singles chronology
"Gūzen no Kakuritsu" (2008)	"Drive Away/Shiawase no Jōken" (2008)	"Jōnetsu no Daishō/Escape" (2008)

"Drive Away/Shiawase no Jōken" is the second single by the band Girl Next Door and it was released on October 8, 2008. "Drive away" was used as the commercial song for Toyota Technical Development Corp. while "Shiawase no Jōken" was used as the ending theme for Osama no Branch.

== CD track listing ==
1. Drive Away
2. Shiawase no Jōken (幸福の条件)
3. Drive Away (Maximizor Mix)
4. Drive Away (Ice Cream Mix)

== DVD track listing ==
1. Drive Away (Music Video: Special Version)

== Charts ==
=== Oricon Sales Chart ===
Release	Chart	Peak position	Debut sales	Sales total
October 8, 2008	Oricon Daily Singles Chart	3		
October 8, 2008	Oricon Weekly Singles Chart	3	21,081	33,474
October 8, 2008	Oricon Monthly Singles Chart	18		
October 8, 2008	Oricon Yearly Singles Chart	218		

=== Billboard Japan ===
Release	Chart	Peak position
September 3, 2008	Billboard Japan Hot 100	3
September 3, 2008	Billboard Japan Top Singles Sales	6
