= Hub Sports Arena =

Sports channel in SIngapore

- Country: Singapore
- Network: StarHub TV

Programming
- Language: English
- Picture format: HDTV 1080i SDTV 576i

Ownership
- Owner: StarHub

History
- Launched: 15 January 2010
- Closed: 28 December 2018

Availability

Terrestrial
- UHF: 76.25 MHz (Singapore)

Hub Sports Arena, formerly SuperSports Arena, was a Singaporean television sports channel operated by StarHub, available on StarHub TV. It broadcast coverage of sporting events such as Lions 12 (M-League) and S-League.

The channel was a free channel and came to be in October 2013 due to an agreement between StarHub and Singapore Sports Council; the channel was launched on 10 October 2013. Thanks to a partnership with the S-League, the channel started airing its matches in 2016.

Hub Sports Arena ceased transmission on 28 December 2018, shortly before analogue broadcasts in Singapore were turned off.

== Coverage ==
- Lions 12 (M-League)
- S-League
- National School Games 2015 in Singapore
- National School Games 2015 In Malaysia
