= Gūzen no Kakuritsu =

"偶然の確率" "Gūzen no Kakuritsu"

Single by Girl Next Door

from the album Girl Next Door
- B-side: "Breath"
- Released: September 3, 2008 (Japan)
- Genre: J-Pop
- Label: Avex Trax
- Songwriters: Kato Kenn: Chisa Maekawa; Daisuke Suzuki

Girl Next Door singles chronology
"偶然の確率" "Gūzen no Kakuritsu" (2008)	"Drive away/Shiawase no Jōken" (2008)

"Gūzen no Kakuritsu" is the debut single by the band Girl Next Door and it was released on September 3, 2008. It is the theme song for the Japanese show CDTV while the B-side Breath was used as the ending theme for Uwasa no Tokyo Magazine.

== CD track listing ==
1. Gūzen no Kakuritsu (偶然の確率)
2. Breath
3. Red Ribbon ~Unmei no Hito~ (~運命の人~)
4. Gūzen no Kakuritsu (ice cream mix)
5. Gūzen no Kakuritsu (Instrumental)
6. Breath (Instrumental)

== DVD track listing ==
1. Gūzen no Kakuritsu (Music Video: Special Version)

== Charts ==
=== Oricon sales chart ===
Release	Chart	Peak position	Debut sales	Sales total
September 3, 2008	Oricon Daily Singles Chart	3		
September 3, 2008	Oricon Weekly Singles Chart	3	30,025	58,137
September 3, 2008	Oricon Monthly Singles Chart	17		
September 3, 2008	Oricon Yearly Singles Chart	125		

=== Billboard Japan ===
Release	Chart	Peak position
September 3, 2008	Billboard Japan Hot 100	2
September 3, 2008	Billboard Japan Hot Singles Sales	5
