= Astro Sensasi =

Malay-language television channel

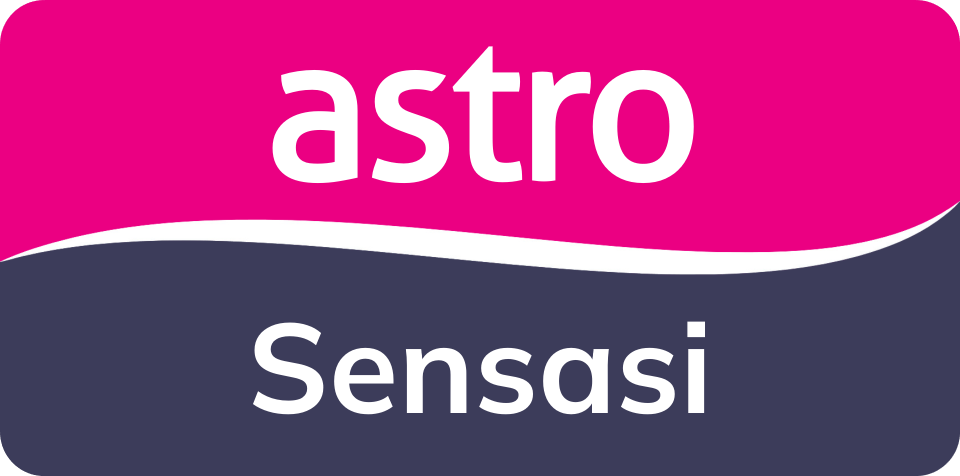
- Country: Singapore
- Broadcast area: Singapore
- Network: StarHub TV

Programming
- Languages: Malay; Indonesian
- Picture format: HDTV (1080i 16:9)

Ownership
- Owner: Astro
- Sister channels: Astro Warna

History
- Launched: 7 August 2007 (as Hub Sensasi); 28 April 2022 (as Astro Sensasi)
- Former names: Hub Sensasi (2007–2022)

Links
- Website: StarHub TV

Astro Sensasi - which means 'Sensation' in Malay, is the first and only dedicated Malay channel that showcases a large variety of programmes ranging from dramas, movies, entertainment and variety, documentaries to other magazine programmes.

== History ==
August 7, 2007

- Sensasi started as the first Malay language cable television channel in Singapore, broadcasting 18 hours a day from 7:00 am to 1:00 am. The channel launched at 7:00 pm.

May 1, 2013

- Sensasi began broadcasting 24 hours a day and using the slogan Detik Detik Sensasi. Sensasi began airing 6 hours of new content per day instead of 3.5 hours per day. Talk shows and magazine shows are now airing a week after its first broadcast in Malaysia.

April 28, 2022

- Hub Sensasi changes to Astro Sensasi. Astro Sensasi started Indonesian programming as well as Malaysian programming. It is currently owned by Astro.
