= Jōnetsu no Daishō/Escape =

Single by Girl Next Door

from the album Girl Next Door
- Released: November 19, 2008
- Genre: Pop
- Label: Avex Trax

Girl Next Door singles chronology
"Drive Away/Shiawase no Jōken" (2008)	"Jōnetsu no Daishō/Escape" (2008)	"Seeds of Dream" (2009)

CD + DVD
- CD + DVD cover

"Jōnetsu no Daishō/Escape" is the third single by the band Girl Next Door and was released on November 19, 2008. This was the last single the band released before their first album Girl Next Door. Jōnetsu no Daishō was the theme song for the Japanese television drama Giragira while "Escape" was used as the commercial song for Au's W65T phone.

== CD track listing ==
1. "Jōnetsu no Daishō" (情熱の代償)
2. Escape
3. Jōnetsu no Daishō (Shinichi Osawa Remix)
4. Jōnetsu no Daishō (Ice Cream Mix)

== DVD track listing ==
1. Jōnetsu no Daishō (Music Video: Special Version)

== Charts ==
Chart (2008)	Peak position
Billboard Japan Hot 100	3
Japan Oricon Weekly Singles Chart	3
