= Kalok Chow =

Hong Kong actor

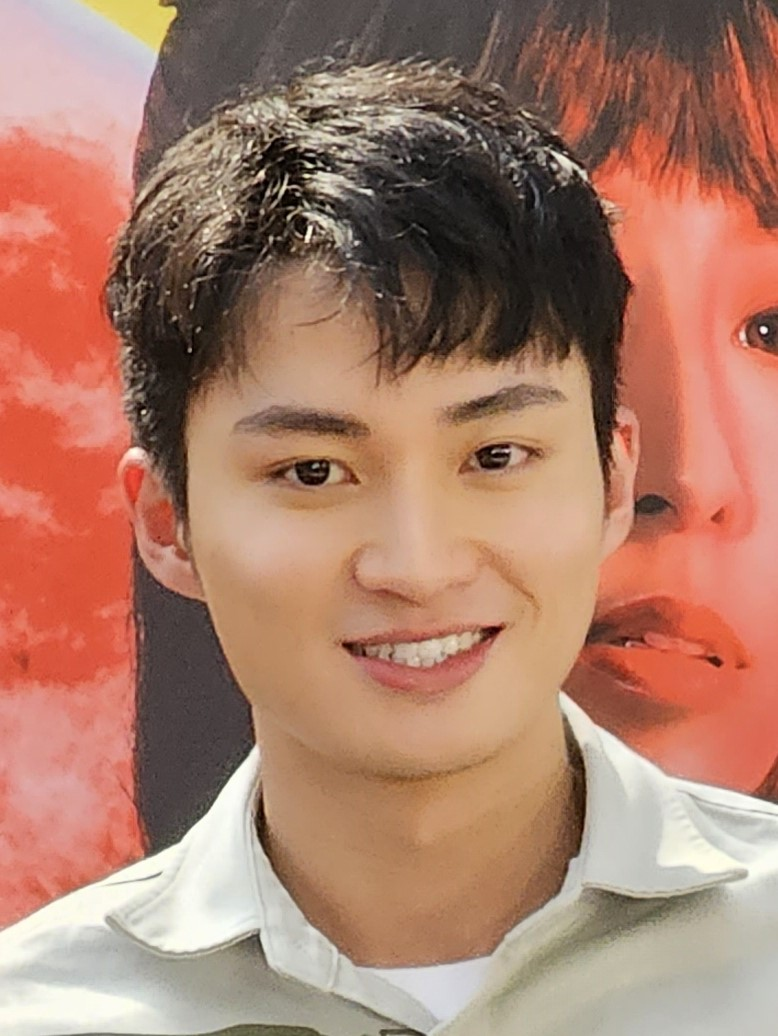
- Chow attending a promotional event for the TVB drama series Treasure of Destiny on 26 February 2023.
- Born: Chow Ka Lok; 7 October 1995 (age 30); Hong Kong
- Occupation: Actor
- Years active: 2015–present
- Notable work: Come Home Love: Lo and Behold; Your Highness
- Awards: TVB Anniversary Awards – Best Supporting Actor; 2019 Come Home Love: Lo and Behold; Most Popular Male Character; 2022 Your Highness

Chinese name
- Chinese: 周嘉洛
Transcriptions
Standard Mandarin
- Hanyu Pinyin: Zhōu Jiāluò
Yue: Cantonese
- Jyutping: Zau1 Gaa1Lok3

Kalok Chow (Chinese: 周嘉洛; born 7 October 1995) is a Hong Kong actor currently contracted to TVB.

He is best known for his work in the ongoing TVB sitcom franchise, Come Home Love. In particular, he won the TVB Anniversary Award for Best Supporting Actor in 2019 for his comedic performance as Kam Shing-On in Come Home Love: Lo and Behold. He won the TVB Anniversary Award for Most Popular Male Character with his role in the 2022 drama Your Highness.

== Early life ==
Kalok Chow was born on 7 October 1995 in Hong Kong and grew up as the middle child in a family of three children. He attended Ho Yu College and Primary School, where he discovered his passion for acting and performing after a drama teacher noticed his expressive personality and encouraged him to join the school's drama club. After completing Form 3 in Hong Kong, he pursued his senior high school studies abroad at Henley High School in Adelaide, Australia. Chow returned to Hong Kong shortly upon completing Year 12.

== Career ==
Chow successfully auditioned for TVB's 28th Artiste Training Class in 2015, after being encouraged by his older sister who saw a television advertisement for the opportunity. He appeared in many background roles as part of this training, including in Come Home Love, which was his television debut. A few months later, Chow was cast in a regular role in 2016 sitcom Come Home Love: Dinner at 8, playing a network television production assistant named 'Yu Yat-Tong'.

In 2017, Chow began playing a major supporting role in the ongoing sitcom Come Home Love: Lo and Behold as the lazy zillennial 'Kam Shing-On (On Jai)'. His comedic performance in the role gained him significant popularity and critical acclaim, establishing him as one of the series' standout characters. The role also earned him several nominations and awards – most notably Best Supporting Actor at the 2019 TVB Anniversary Awards. He currently holds the record for being the youngest actor to win this award, at age 24. In March 2021, it was announced that he would be taking a break from the role after 1255 episodes. He briefly returned to the role in February 2022, and has continued to make guest appearances in between filming other projects ever since.

In 2021, it was announced that Chow would be replacing Wong Cho Lam in wuxia comedy Your Highness. This drama marked Chow's debut in a first male lead role, and it aired in August 2022 to positive reception, with its success leading to the announcement of a sequel shortly after its finale. Chow's performance earned him the Most Popular Male Character award at the 2022 TVB Anniversary Awards, while his on-screen chemistry with Jeannie Chan garnered both a Most Popular On-Screen Couple award at the AEG Entertainment Awards and a Best On-Screen Partners award at the 2022 TVB Anniversary Awards, shared with Brian Chu, JW, and Jonathan Cheung. In the same year, Chow also starred in mini-series Communion.

Chow has continued to take on notable roles in dramas such as Treasure of Destiny, My Pet My Angel and Romeo and His Butterfly Lover. He has also been announced as part of the main line-up in upcoming legal drama Themis: Goddess of Justice, starring alongside Charmaine Sheh, Patrick Tam, Alice Chan and Benz Hui.

== Filmography ==
=== Television dramas ===
Year	Title	Role	Notes
2015	Come Home Love	Classmate	Episode 973
2015	Come Home Love	Groomsman	Episode 995
2016	Come Home Love: Dinner at 8	Yu Yat-tong (余日潼)	Recurring Role
2016	ICAC Investigators 2016	Pedestrian	Episode 1
2016	My Dangerous Mafia Retirement Plan	Gangster	1 episode
2016	Presumed Accidents	Constable	Episode 8
2016	Presumed Accidents	At-Risk Youth	Episode 9
2016	House of Spirits	Customer	Episode 15
2016	Between Love & Desire	Busker	1 episode
2016	Daddy Dearest	Basketball Team Member	Episode 1
2016	A Fist Within Four Walls	Kowloon Walled City Resident	4 episodes
2016	Law dis-Order	Policeman	Episodes 6, 18, 19, 23
2016	Brother's Keeper II	Subordinate	Episode 36
2016	Two Steps From Heaven	Customer	Episodes 1–3, 5, 10, 11, 15, 19, 24, 25
2016	Two Steps From Heaven	Waiter	Episode 13
2017–present	Come Home Love: Lo and Behold	Kam Shing-On (金城安)	Major Supporting Role, Episodes 1–1255; Recurring Role, Episodes 1459–present
2017	Recipes To Live By	Persian Messenger	Episode 12
2017	May Fortune Smile On You	Pedestrian	Episodes 2, 4, 5, 30
2017	May Fortune Smile On You	Party Guest	1 episode
2017	Burning Hands	Subordinate	Episode 3
2017	Destination Nowhere	Policeman	Episodes 30
2017	Provacateur	Waiter	Episode 16
2017	The No No Girl	Groomsman	Episode 8
2017	Legal Mavericks	Customer	1 episode
2017	The Unholy Alliance	Subordinate	Episodes 24, 25
2017	Nothing Special Force	Subordinate	Episode 5
2017	The Exorcist's Meter	Gangster	Episodes 5, 6
2017	My Ages Apart	Gangster	Episode 27
2017	My Ages Apart	Tang Ka-Long (鄧家朗)	Episode 41
2018	Threesome	Liverpool Fan	Episodes 5, 6
2018	Life on the Line	Soccer Player #1	Episode 4
2018	OMG, Your Honour	Tong Kwan-Yiu (湯軍瑤)	Episode 1
2019	My Life as Loan Shark	Lam (霖)	Episode 8
2021	Flying Tiger 3	Young Don Cheung Wai-Wah (年輕張偉樺)	Guest Appearance, Episodes 2, 5, 8
2022	You Light Me Up	Chow Kong-Hong (周港康)	Main Role
2022	Communion	Au Ka-Kin (區家健)	Major Supporting Role
2022	Your Highness	Kei Wei (紀威)	Main Role
2023	Treasure of Destiny	Oh Kin-Ning (柯建寧)	Main Role
2023	My Pet My Angel	Golden Wong Sing-Yan (汪聲仁)	Main Role
2023	Romeo and His Butterfly Lover	Romeo (羅密歐)	Main Role
2025	Your Finesse	Fei Yan (費仁)	Main Role
2026	Themis	Edgar Cheng Siu-Man (鄭邵文)	Main Role
TBA	Martial Arts World	Nip Fei-Wan (聶飛雲)	Main Role
TBA	The Airport Diary II	Ching Yat-Fei (程日飛)	Main Role

== Awards and nominations ==
=== Hong Kong Television Awards ===
Year	Category	Drama(s)	Result
2017	Best Newcomer	—N/a	Nominated
2018	Best Newcomer	—N/a	Nominated
2018	Best Supporting Actor	Come Home Love: Lo and Behold	Nominated

=== People's Choice Television Awards ===
Year	Category	Drama(s)	Result
2018	Most Improved Male Artiste	—N/a	Nominated
2018	Best Supporting Actor	Come Home Love: Lo and Behold	Nominated
2018	Best On-Screen Partnership for a Drama (with Ricco Ng, Sarkis Fung and Sky Chiu)	Come Home Love: Lo and Behold	Nominated

=== TVB Anniversary Awards ===
Year	Category	Drama(s)	Result
2019	Most Improved Male Artiste	My Life as Loan Shark, Come Home Love: Lo and Behold	Nominated
2019	Most Popular Male Character	Come Home Love: Lo and Behold	Nominated
2019	Best Supporting Actor	Come Home Love: Lo and Behold	Won
2019	Most Popular On-Screen Partnership (with Ricco Ng)	Come Home Love: Lo and Behold	Nominated
2019	Best OST (with the ensemble of Come Home Love: Lo and Behold)	Come Home Love: Lo and Behold	Nominated
2020	Lifetime Achievement Award (with the ensemble of Come Home Love: Lo and Behold)	Come Home Love: Lo and Behold	Won
2021	Most Popular Male Character	Come Home Love: Lo and Behold	Top 5 Finalist
2021	Most Popular On-Screen Partnership (with Ricco Ng, Sky Chiu, Keefe Ng, Oman Lam, Tom Lo, Andrea So, Iris Lam and Sophie Yip)	Come Home Love: Lo and Behold	Nominated
2022	Best Actor	You Light Me Up	Nominated
2022	Best Actor	Your Highness	Top 5 Finalist
2022	Most Popular Male Character	You Light Me Up	Nominated
2022	Most Popular Male Character	Communion	Nominated
2022	Most Popular Male Character	Your Highness	Won
2022	Best Supporting Actor	Communion	Nominated
2022	Favourite TVB Actor in Malaysia	You Light Me Up	Nominated
2022	Favourite TVB Actor in Malaysia	Your Highness	Top 10 Finalist
2022	Favourite OST	I am the Protagonist (Theme from "Your Highness")	Nominated
2022	Most Popular On-Screen Partnership (with Ricco Ng, Joey Thye, Kayan Yau)	Communion	Nominated
2022	Most Popular On-Screen Partnership (with Jeannie Chan, JW, Brian Chu, Jonathan Cheung)	Your Highness	Won
2023	Best Actor	Treasure of Destiny	Nominated
2023	Best Actor	My Pet My Angel	Top 10 Finalist
2023	Best Actor	Romeo And His Butterfly Lover	Nominated
2023	Favourite TVB Actor in Greater Bay Area	My Pet My Angel	Nominated
2023	Favourite TVB Actor in Malaysia	Treasure of Destiny	Nominated
2023	Favourite TVB Actor in Malaysia	My Pet My Angel	Nominated

=== AEG Entertainment Awards ===
Year	Category	Drama(s)	Result
2022	Best Couple (with Jeannie Chan)	Your Highness	Won
