= Astro Zhi Zun HD =

Malaysian television channel

- Country: Malaysia
- Broadcast area: Malaysia

Programming
- Languages: Mandarin (until 12 January 2013); Cantonese
- Picture format: 16:9 (HD)

Ownership
- Owner: Astro
- Sister channels: Astro AEC; Astro Hua Hee Dai HD; Astro Shuang Xing; Astro Quan Jia HD; Astro Wah Lai Toi; Astro Xiao Tai Yang

History
- Launched: 16 June 2010
- Closed: 6 October 2014
- Replaced by: Astro Wah Lai Toi HD

Links
- Website: zhongwen.astro.com.my/Channels/ZZHD

Astro Zhi Zun HD
- Simplified Chinese: 至尊HD
- Literal meaning: Extreme HD (Straight translation)
Transcriptions

Astro Zhi Zun HD (Astro至尊HD in Simplified Chinese) was a Malaysian channel that began broadcasting on 16 June 2010 as Astro's first Chinese-language channel and non-English language HD channel. This channel mirrored 80% of the content on its sister channel Astro Wah Lai Toi, including drama series and sitcoms on weekdays, as well as variety shows, game shows and travelogues.

Until 12 January 2013, Astro Zhi Zun HD featured programmes in Mandarin and Cantonese. This included Chinese dramas, documentaries, variety shows, TVB content, and local Cantonese programmes. The non-Cantonese content on Astro Zhi Zun HD was then moved to Astro Quan Jia HD.

Astro Zhi Zun HD was renamed to Astro Wah Lai Toi HD on 6 October 2014.
