= Kiko Leung =

Hong Kong artist

- 梁茵
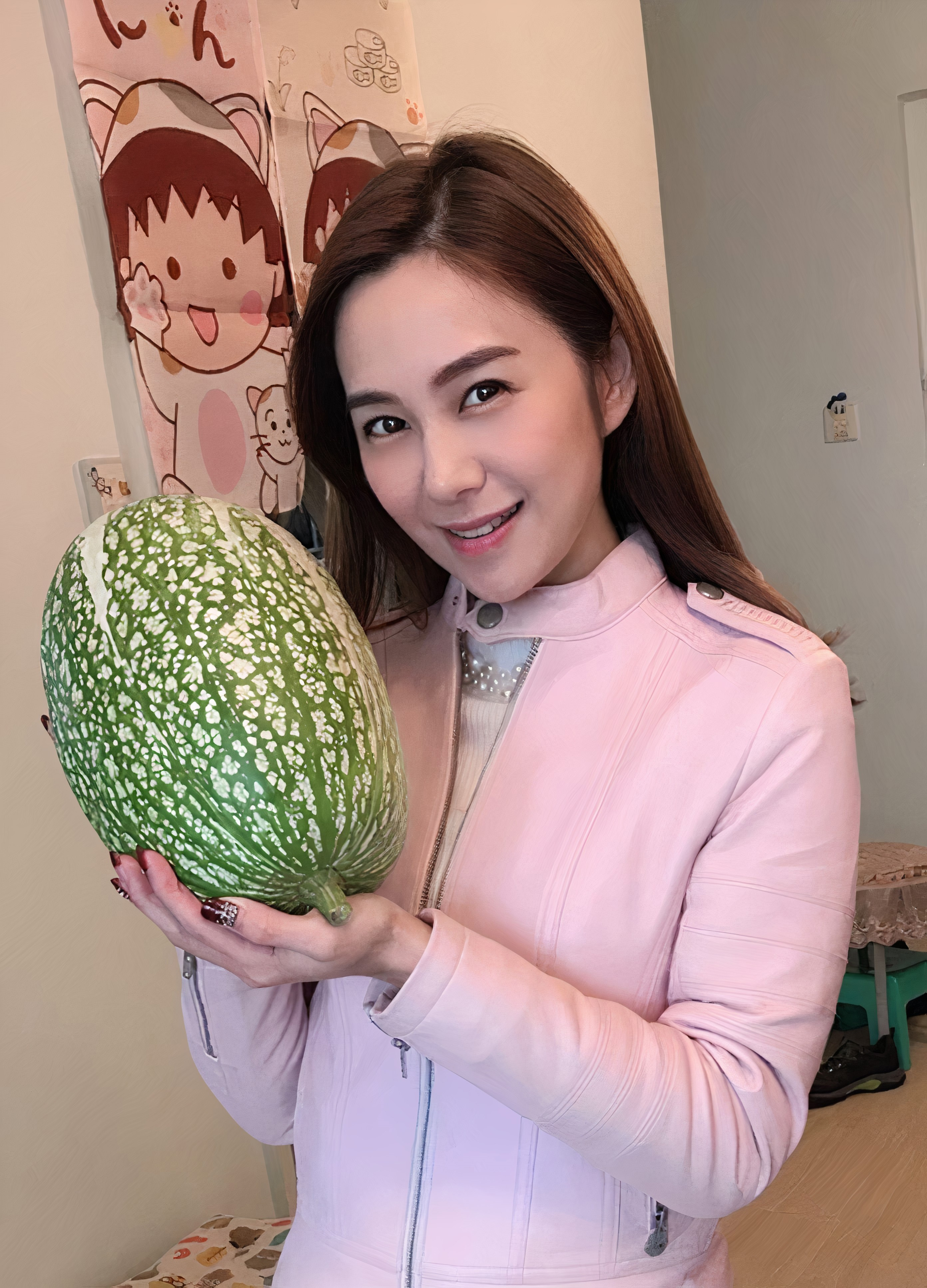
- Leung in 2012
- Born: December 31, 1993 (age 32); British Hong Kong
- Occupations: Actress; model
- Years active: 2012–present

Kiko Leung (born December 31, 1993) is a Hong Kong actress and TVB artist.

== Background ==
Leung was born on December 31, 1993, in British Hong Kong. Her father is a construction worker and her mother an acupuncturist. She has a younger brother. In 2012, she was discovered by TVB while studying at the Hong Kong Academy for Performing Arts. Leung proceeded to drop of in order to enter the 26th TVB Artist Training Class. Among her classmates was Matthew Ho.

== Career ==
In 2016, Leung Yin became known for her role as Kay Lee in the TVB sitcom Come Home Love. From 2017 to 2021, Leung played Anita in the spin-off series Come Home Love: Lo and Behold.
