= Miss Asia =

Miss Asia may refer to:

- Miss Asia Pageant, organized by the Asia Television Limited in Hong Kong
- Miss Universe, an annual international beauty pageant
- Miss World, the oldest running international beauty pageant
- Miss International, a Tokyo-based international beauty pageant

== See also ==
- Miss Asia Pacific International, a 1968–2020 beauty pageant in the Philippines
- Miss Asia Pacific World, a beauty pageant in South Korea established in 2011
