= Come Home Love: Dinner at 8 =

Hong Kong drama television series

- Official poster
- Also known as: Seated at 8 (八時入席)
- 愛·回家之八時入席]
- Genre: Modern Sitcom
- Created by: Hong Kong Television Broadcasts Limited
- Written by: Sandy Shaw (head writer); Choi Suk-yin; Lau Wai-kit; Cheung Wai-yin; Hui Ka-yu
- Directed by: Sin Yin-fung; Chan Seung-kuen; Yau Nam-lung
- Starring: Teresa Mo; Wayne Lai; Power Chan; Angela Tong; Chung King-fai; Florence Kwok; Eric Li; William Hu; Mark Ma; Veronica Shiu; Ricco Ng; Jessica Kan
- Theme music composer: Alan Cheung
- Opening theme: Perfect Life (完美的生活) by Jinny Ng
- Country of origin: Hong Kong
- Original language: Cantonese
- No. of episodes: 200

Production
- Executive producer: Catherine Tsang
- Producer: Law Chun-ngok
- Production location: Hong Kong
- Editors: Choi Suk-yin, Siu Lei-king, Ma Chun-ying, Sin Chui-ching
- Camera setup: Multi camera
- Running time: 22 minutes (without commercial)
- Production company: TVB

Original release
- Network: Jade
- Release: 4 April 2016

Related
- Come Home Love; Come Home Love (series 2); Come Home Love: Lo and Behold

Come Home Love: Dinner at 8
- Traditional Chinese: 愛·回家之八時入席
- Simplified Chinese: 爱·回家之八时入席
- Cantonese Yale: Oi·Wùihgā Baatsìh Yahpjihk
- Literal meaning: "Love Returning Home, Seated at 8"
Transcriptions
Standard Mandarin
- Hanyu Pinyin: Ài·Huíjiā Zhī Bāshí Rùxí
- Bopomofo: ㄞˋ ㄏㄨㄟˊㄐㄧㄚ ㄓ ㄅㄚㄕˊ ㄖㄨˋㄒㄧˊ
Yue: Cantonese
- Yale Romanization: Oi·Wùihgā Baatsìh Yahpjihk
- Jyutping: Oi3·Wui4gaa1 Zi1 Baat3si4 Jap6zik6
- IPA: [ɔ̄ːy wṷːy.káː tsíː pāːt̚.si̭ː jɐ̀p̚.tsèk̚]

Come Home Love: Dinner at 8 (Chinese: 愛·回家之八時入席; literally "Love Returning Home, Seated at 8") is a 2016 daily half-hour Hong Kong sitcom created by TVB and produced by Law Chun-ngok, who also produced the two previous Come Home Love. Filming began in March 2016 and will be filmed as it airs. The series premiered on April 4, 2016, airing every Monday to Friday on Hong Kong's TVB Jade, Malaysia's Astro Wah Lai Toi and Australia's TVBJ channels during its 8:00-8:30 pm timeslot, with an expected 120 episodes. As of August 17, 2016, it is announced that the episodes to be increased to 200.

Come Home Love: Dinner at 8 is an indirect sequel to the previous two series that shares the "Come Home Love" title. Unlike the second Come Home Love, which spawned off from the first series with a few returning characters from the first series to tie the two series together, Come Home Love: Dinner at 8 has no connections to the two previous series that share part of the same title. Florence Kwok is the only cast member to return from the previous series, but in Come Home Love: Dinner at 8, she portrays an entirely new character. The Come Home Love was added to the title of the new sitcom as TVB was bittersweet to see the long running highly rated series come to an end

The series revolves around employees of a fictional Hong Kong television station and their personal family life.

== Synopsis ==
TVI's (Television International) Senior Manager of accounting, Lam Siu-siu (Teresa Mo), meets TVI's Director of production, Koo Hiu-san (Wayne Lai), when he calls her into a meeting, asking why none of his requested work equipment has been approved for budget. Siu-siu calmly explains that due to errors his assistant Tong Chong-shu (Mark Ma) had in filing the paperwork, they missed the deadline before the fiscal quarter ends, and the account department will not approve any new budget request. Hiu-san, who has a reputation as a mean boss, demands to have the issue resolved right away, but Siu-siu tells him to schedule another meeting with her as it is late and nearly time to end work. Unimpressed with the rationale, Hiu-san mocks Siu-siu for leaving work with the issue unresolved. Hiu-san's comments backfire when Siu-siu mocks him back by hinting that his department is unorganized and then telling him the available executive secretary position in his department has been unfilled for so long because no one wants to work for him.

Hiu-san finds a way to get Siu-siu to resolve his department's invoice issues when he hints that her best friend Chiu Lei-hung's (Angela Tong) job might be on the line. Since then, Siu-siu has assumed Hiu-san is biased against her and wants to get back at her for her insults at their earlier meeting. Lei-hung, an unruly worker and slacker, begins working harder, knowing that she might be out of a job soon. Seeing Hiu-san's success in getting Lei-hung to change, Siu-siu ask him for advice on how to handle Lei-hung, since her unemployed make-up artist uncle, Lam Yi-mak (Power Chan), who lives with her, has a similar personality to Lei-hung. Siu-siu learns that Hiu-san does have a softer side when she coincidentally meets his father, Koo Lik-hang (Chung King-fai), after losing her cellular phone.

Siu-siu is tricked by her co-worker into transferring out of the accounting department, as she thinks someone will be fired because of company budget issues. Due to her kindness towards her co-workers, she volunteers to leave the accounting department and interviews for all available positions within TVI, even Hiu-san's longtime unfilled executive secretary position. During her interview, Siu-siu does not expect Hiu-san to hire her because of their past clashes, so she gives an honest opinion about him and his department during her interview. Siu-siu is devastated when she finds out her co-worker had been wanting to take her position, but her day, however ends on a high note when Hiu-San offers her the executive secretary position and lets her know her salary will be higher than what she is currently making as an accountant.

== Cast ==
=== Main cast ===
- Teresa Mo as Lam Siu-siu (林小小)
- Wayne Lai as Koo Hiu-san (古曉臣)
- Power Chan as Lam Yi-mak (林以默)
- Angela Tong as Chiu Lei-hung (趙麗虹)
- Chung King-fai as Koo Lik-hang (古力行)
- Florence Kwok as Wan Fei-fei (雲飛飛)
  - Jeannie Chan as young Wan Fei-fei (青年)
- Eric Li as Ryan Cha Wai-yan (卓威仁)
- William Hu as Ciu Wai (招偉)
- Mark Ma as Tong Chong-shu (唐中書)
- Amisha Ng as Ka Lei (嘉莉)
- Kalok Chow as Ah Tong (阿潼)
- Veronica Shiu as Yan Yan (殷欣)
- Ricco Ng as Lam Wo (林禾)
- Jessica Kan as Elsa (袁冰冰)

=== Extended Cast ===
- Kimmy Kwan as Daisy (劉愛思)
- Jan Tse as Christy
- Jimmy Au as K.C.
- Kim Li as Terry
- Hebe Chan as Bonnie (劉可怡)
- Aurora Li as 蚊蚊 (施敏)
- Roxanne Tong as Yan
- Hero Yuen as 阿齊 (鍾 齊)
- Glen Lee as 明哥 (江 明)
- Stephen Ho as 申監製 (申 聲)
- Joseph Yeung as Wilson (時天信)
- Mandy Lam as Dina
- Vicky Chan as Coco
- KK Cheung as Jason Yu (余總理)

=== Guest star ===
- Anthony Wong as Himself

== Development ==
- In early February 2016, TVB announced that the highly popular Come Home Love series would be coming to an end with the final episode to be broadcast on April 1, 2016 and announced Wayne Lai and Teresa Mo to be headlining the upcoming series to take the timeslot.
- Power Chan had declined to renew his contract with TVB in October 2015 in order to explore other work options outside of TVB, but decided to return to TVB when female lead Teresa Mo offered him a role in the new sitcom.

== Viewership Ratings ==
#	Timeslot (HKT)	Week	Episode(s)	Average points	Peaking points
1	Mon – Fri; 20:00－20:30	04–08 Apr 2016	1 — 5	25	30
2	Mon – Fri; 20:00－20:30	11–15 Apr 2016	6 — 10	22	25
3	Mon – Fri; 20:00－20:30	18–22 Apr 2016	11 — 15	24	26
4	Mon – Fri; 20:00－20:30	25–29 Apr 2016	16 — 20	24	27
5	Mon – Fri; 20:00－20:30	02–6 May 2016	21 — 25	23	25
6	Mon – Fri; 20:00－20:30	09–13 May 2016	26 — 30	23	26
7	Mon – Fri; 20:00－20:30	16–20 May 2016	31 — 35	23	27
8	Mon – Fri; 20:00－20:30	23–27 May 2016	36 — 40	23	--
9	Mon – Fri; 20:00－20:30	30 May–03 Jun 2016	41 — 45	23	--
10	Mon – Fri; 20:00－20:30	06–10 Jun 2016	46 — 50	22	--
11	Mon – Fri; 20:00－20:30	13–17 Jun 2016	51 — 55	22	--
12	Mon – Fri; 20:00－20:30	20–24 Jun 2016	56 — 60	23	--
13	Mon – Fri; 20:00－20:30	27 Jun–01 Jul 2016	61 — 65	--	--
14	Mon – Fri; 20:00－20:30	06–08 Jul 2016	66 — 70	--	--
15	Mon – Fri; 20:00－20:30	11–15 Jul 2016	71 — 75	23	--
16	Mon – Fri; 20:00－20:30	18–22 Jul 2016	76 — 80		
17	Mon – Fri; 20:00－20:30	25–29 Jul 2016	81 — 85		
18	Mon – Fri; 20:00－20:30	01–05 Aug 2016	86 — 90		
19	Mon – Fri; 20:00－20:30	08–12 Aug 2016	91 — 95		
20	Mon – Fri; 20:00－20:30	15–19 Aug 2016	96 — 100	22	
21	Mon – Fri; 20:00－20:30	22–26 Aug 2016	101 — 105	25	
22	Mon – Fri; 20:00－20:30	29 Aug-02 Sep 2016	106 — 110	24	
23	Mon – Fri; 20:00－20:30	05–09 Sep 2016	111 — 115		
24	Mon – Fri; 20:00－20:30	12–16 Sep 2016	116 — 120		
25	Mon – Fri; 20:00－20:30	19–23 Sep 2016	121 - 125		
26	Mon – Fri; 20:00－20:30	26–30 Sep 2016	126 - 130	23	
27	Mon – Fri; 20:00－20:30	3–7 Oct 2016	131 - 135	23	
28	Mon – Fri; 20:00－20:30	10–14 Oct 2016	136 - 140	24	
29	Mon – Fri; 20:00－20:30	17–21 Oct 2016	141 - 145	26	32
30	Mon – Fri; 20:00－20:30	24–28 Oct 2016	146 - 150	23	
31	Mon – Fri; 20:00－20:30	31 Oct–4 Nov 2016	151 - 155	24	27
32	Mon – Fri; 20:00－20:30	7–11 Nov 2016	156 - 160	24	
33	Mon – Fri; 20:00－20:30	14–18 Nov 2016	161 - 165	24	
34	Mon – Fri; 20:00－20:30	21–25 Nov 2016	166 - 170		
35	Mon – Fri; 20:00－20:30	28 Nov–2 Dec 2016	171 - 175	24	
36	Mon – Fri; 20:00－20:30	5-9 Dec 2016	176 - 180	24	
37	Mon – Fri; 20:00－20:30	12-16 Dec 2016	181 - 185	24	
38	Mon – Fri; 20:00－20:30	19-23 Dec 2016	186 - 190	23	
39	Mon – Fri; 20:00－20:30	26-30 Dec 2016	191 - 195	23	
40	Mon – Fri; 20:00－20:30	2-6 Jan 2017	196 - 200	22	
Total average				23	

== See also ==
- Come Home Love
- Come Home Love (series 2)
