= Alice Chan =

Hong Kong actress

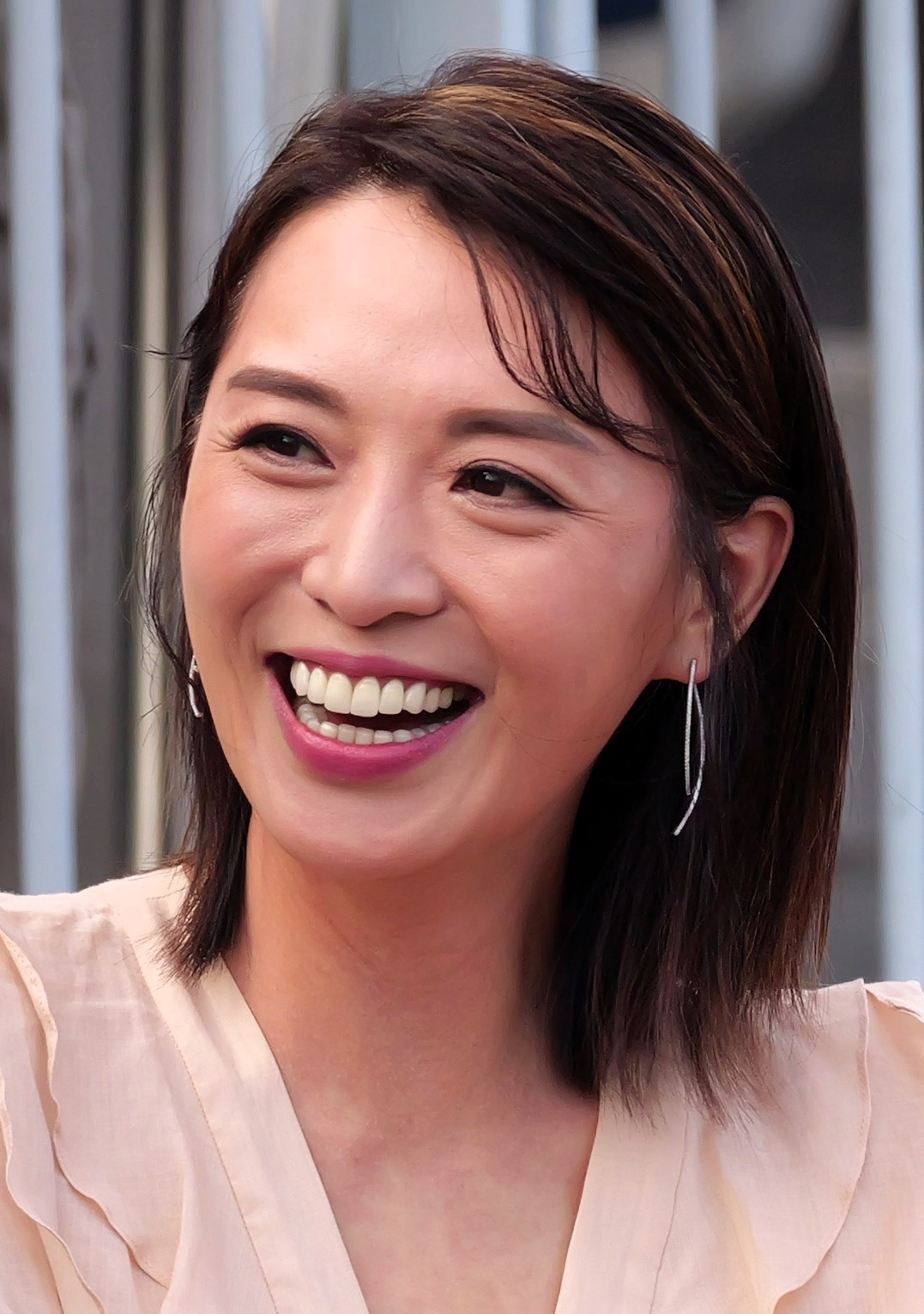
- Chan in 2024
- Born: Beijing, China
- Occupation: Actress
- Years active: 1996–2008; 2012–present
- Spouses: James Yen (m. 2008; div. 2012) Aldous Chan (m. 2022)
- Awards: StarHub TVB Awards – My Favourite Female Characters; 2016 Lord of Shanghai TVB Anniversary Awards – Most Popular Female Character; 2018 Deep in the Realm of Conscience

Chinese name
- Traditional Chinese: 陳煒
- Simplified Chinese: 陈炜
Transcriptions
Standard Mandarin
- Hanyu Pinyin: Chén Wěi
Yue: Cantonese
- Jyutping: Can4 Wai5
- Musical career
- Also known as: Wai Gor (煒哥; lit. "Big Brother Wai")
- Origin: Hong Kong

Alice Chan Wai is a Hong Kong actress currently contracted to TVB.

== Early life ==
Alice Chan was born in Beijing, with ancestry in the county-level city of Puning in Guangdong. She settled in Hong Kong with her parents and elder sister when she was one-and-a-half years old. After graduating high school, she attended Chu Hai College of Higher Education but She stopped after two years of study to enter the Miss Asia 1996 beauty pageant at 22 years old.

== Career ==
Chan began her television and acting career after winning the Miss Asia 1996 beauty pageant. She signed a management contract with Asia Television (ATV) that same year, and began filming her first television production. Chan quickly became one of the most popular actresses in ATV, alongside Joey Meng, Kristal Tin and Kristy Yang. In 2005, she gained recognition for her leading role of a series that was loosely based on the late actress Anita Mui.

Chan retired from the industry after marrying the Taiwanese businessman James Yen. In 2012, after divorcing with Yen, Chan returned to acting and signed an artiste contract with TVB.

In 2018, Chan earned critical acclaim with her role as the villainous Princess Taiping in the period drama Deep in the Realm of Conscience and won the Most Popular Female Character award at the 2018 TVB Anniversary Awards.

== Personal life ==
In 2008, Chan married Taiwanese businessman James Yen. They divorced in 2012. In 2019, Chan was spotted dating with a doctor. She later admitted that she was in a new relationship with a doctor named Aldous Chan. On 22 November 2021, Chan announced her engagement with her boyfriend. On 26 September 2022, the couple held their wedding in The Peninsula Hotel in Tsim Sha Tsui.

Chan is good friends with Wonder Women co-actresses Miriam Yeung and Rebecca Zhu.

== Filmography ==
=== Television dramas (ATV) ===
Year	Title	Role	Notes
1997	The Snow is Red	Chan Yuen-sheung	
1997	Coincidentally	Lang Chui	
1997	The Year of Chameleon	Aunt D	
1997	My Brother, My Mum	Chu Man-wai	
1998	Pretty Police Woman	Officer Chow Mei-yee	
1998	My Date with a Vampire	Miu-sin / Guanyin	
1999	Ten Tigers of Guangdong	Tung Chi	
1999	Hai Rui Dou Yan Song	Yang Xiaodong	
2000	Divine Retribution	Cheng Hei-man	
2000	A Dream Named Desire	Pauline Chan Ho-yan	
2001	Healing Hearts		
2001	To Where He Belongs	Yau Ying	
2001	A True Cop Story	Kwok Yun-yung	
2001	Love Out of Gamble	Siu Chi-fong	
2002	Son from the Past	Kam Lan / Hung Ling	
2002	As You Wish	Maria	
2003	Jin Ye Wu Feng		
2003	Xie Ling Long		
2003	Shu Si Jiao Liang		
2003	The Chinese Medic Master	Yeung Piu-piu	
2003	Mama, I Love You	Ho Yi-kuen	
2003	Light of Million Hopes	Ng Tin-yuen	
2004	My Date with a Vampire III	Yiu-king / Holy Mother of Yiu Lake	
2005	A Dream Named Desire II	Lui Kim-fong	
2006	Mei Yan Fang Fei	Fang Yanmei	
2006	Concubine of Qing Emperor	Boerjite Shi Jingzhen	
2007	Project A	Lau Yu-yin	
2008	The Kung Fu Master Wong Fei Hung	Fong Chi-wah	

=== Television dramas (TVB) ===
Year	Title	Role	Notes
2012	Friendly Fire	Pong Tit-sum	Supporting Role
2013	Beauty at War	Kwok Yuen-ching	Guest Star
2013	Sniper Standoff	Ting Hau	Major Supporting Role
2014	Palace 3: The Lost Daughter	Liniang	Supporting Role
2014	ICAC Investigators 2014	Yip Mei-la	Supporting Role
2014	Lady Sour	Chin Sheung	Supporting Role
2015	Lord of Shanghai	Yiu Kwai-sang	Major Supporting Role; StarHub TVB Awards for My Favourite Female Characters
2015	With or Without You	Lau Yuet-ngor	Major Supporting Role
2015	Angel In-the-Making	Defea Cheuk Tsz-kwan	Major Supporting Role
2016	My Dangerous Mafia Retirement Plan	So Yau-lam	1st Female Lead
2016	Daddy Dearest	Judy Chu Lai-sin	Major Supporting Role
2016	Two Steps from Heaven	Selina Koo Sing-fun	Major Supporting Role
2017	Married but Available	Carol Sze Ka-lo	Major Supporting Role
2017	Line Walker: The Prelude	Lau Kam-ying	Guest Appearance
2018	Apple-Colada	Barbara Lee Mung-lo (Big Bar)	1st Female Lead
2018	Deep in the Realm of Conscience	Princess Taiping	3rd Female Lead; TVB Anniversary Award for Most Popular Female Character
2019	The Ghetto-Fabulous Lady	Bau Mui-tai	2nd Female Lead
2019	As Time Goes By	Janet Bin Wai-ching (Miss Bin)	1st Female Lead
2019	Wonder Women	Joanna Man Fung-wah	2nd Female Lead
2020	Come Home Love: Lo and Behold	Angelina Lin Na-kuen	Guest Appearance
2020	Forensic Heroes IV	"Queen" Shui Wai-ming	2nd Female Lead
2021	Murder Diary	Leung Yat-sze	Guest Appearance
2021	Forever Young at Heart	Gigi's mother	Guest Appearance
2022	Stranger Anniversary	Flora Lee Tsz-ying	1st Female Lead
2022	Communion	Tang Lai-kuen	1st Female Lead
2022	Against Darkness	"CK" Fong Tze-kiu (Madam Fong)	1st Female Lead
2026	The Unusual Prosecutor	Wong Chung-sing	2nd Female Lead

=== Television dramas (Shaw Brothers Studio) ===
Title	Year	Role	Notes
Flying Tiger 3	2021	Tina Or Tsz-sin	Guest Appearance

=== Film ===
- 1997: 97 Lan Kwai Fong
- 1999: Dial D for Demons
- 2000: Guilty or Not
- 2000: A Wicked Ghost II: The Fear
- 2000: Phantom Call
- 2000: Bio-Cops
- 2000: Ransom Express
- 2001: City of Desire
- 2006: Wise Guys Never Die
- 2007: The Lady Iron Chef
- 2013: Hardcore Comedy
- 2014: Iceman
- 2016: Buddy Cops
- 2019: The Fallen
- TBA: Endless Battle

=== Television variety shows ===
- 2024: From Shenzhen to Zhongshan

== Awards and nominations ==
=== 1996 ===
- Miss Asia beauty pageant

=== 2015 ===
- TVB Anniversary Award for Best Actress Nomination — Lord of Shanghai
- TVB Anniversary Award for Most Popular Female Character Top 5 Nomination — Lord of Shanghai

=== 2016 ===
- StarHub TVB Award for My Favourite Female Characters — Lord of Shanghai
- StarHub TVB Award for My Favourite Supporting Actress — Lord of Shanghai
- TVB Anniversary Award for Best Actress Nomination — My Dangerous Mafia Retirement Plan
- TVB Anniversary Award for Most Popular Female Character Nomination — My Dangerous Mafia Retirement Plan
- TVB Anniversary Award for Best Show Host Nomination — Wai Gor's Wok

=== 2017 ===
- TVB Anniversary Award for Best Supporting Actress Nomination — Line Walker: The Prelude

=== 2018 ===
- TVB Anniversary Award for Best Actress Top 5 Nomination — Deep in the Realm of Conscience
- TVB Anniversary Award for Most Popular Female Character — Deep in the Realm of Conscience
- TVB Anniversary Gala for Favourite TVB Actress in Singapore Nomination — Deep in the Realm of Conscience
- TVB Anniversary Gala for Favourite TVB Actress in Malaysia Nomination — Deep in the Realm of Conscience
- Hong Kong Television Award for Best Leading Actress in Drama Series Top 5 Nomination — Deep in the Realm of Conscience

=== 2019 ===
- TVB Anniversary Award for Best Actress Nomination — As Time Goes By
- TVB Anniversary Award for Most Popular Female Character Nomination — Wonder Women

=== 2020 ===
- TVB Anniversary Award for Best Actress Nomination — Forensic Heroes IV
- TVB Anniversary Award for Most Popular Female Character Nomination — Forensic Heroes IV
- TVB Anniversary Award for Favourite TVB Actress in Malaysia Nomination — Forensic Heroes IV

=== 2021 ===
- TVB Anniversary Award for Best Supporting Actress Top 10 Nomination — Murder Diary

=== 2022 ===
- TVB Anniversary Award for Best Actress Top 10 Nomination — Communion
- TVB Anniversary Award for Best Actress Nomination — Against Darkness
- TVB Anniversary Award for Most Popular Female Character Nomination — Communion and Against Darkness
- TVB Anniversary Award for Favourite TVB Actress in Malaysia Top 10 Nomination — Communion
- TVB Anniversary Award for Favourite TVB Actress in Malaysia Nomination — Against Darkness
- TVB Anniversary Award for Most Popular Onscreen Partnership Nomination — Communion (with Roger Kwok)

Preceded by Kristy Yang 楊恭如	Miss Asia; 1996	Succeeded by Belinda Hamnett 韓君婷
