= Astro Wah Lai Toi =

Cantonese video on demand service

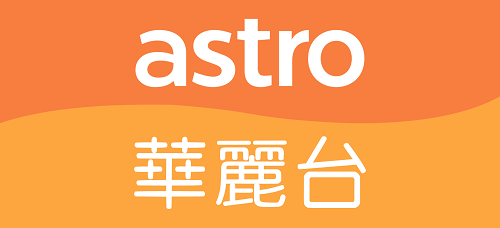
- Country: Malaysia
- Broadcast area: Malaysia; Around Asia (Via satellites)

Programming
- Language: Cantonese
- Picture format: 1080i (HDTV)

Ownership
- Owner: Astro (Astro Malaysia Holdings Berhad)
- Sister channels: Astro AEC; Astro AOD; Astro Hua Hee Dai; Astro QJ

History
- Launched: 1 June 1996 (SD, TV channel); 16 June 2010 (HD, TV channel); 1 May 2020 (On Demand)
- Replaced: TVB Jade (Malaysia Version)
- Closed: 1 April 2020 (SD); 1 May 2020 (TV channel); 1 May 2024 (On Demand)
- Replaced by: TVB Jade (HD); Astro AOD; Astro QJ; Astro AEC

Links
- Website: xuan.com.my/channels/wlt

Astro Wah Lai Toi (Chinese: Astro 華麗台) is a Malaysian Cantonese video on demand service owned and operated by Astro in partnership with Hong Kong's TVB. The channel offers mainly TVB programming, alongside some local content.

To satisfy a greater audience, selected programmes are available in dual audio, in which viewers can select either to watch the programme in Cantonese or Mandarin (or original language of the programme). Subtitles are also available in English, Bahasa Malaysia & Chinese languages by pressing the subtitle button.

== History ==
Since the Malaysian government does not allow any television station to be operated by foreigners; Hong Kong's TVB collaborated with Astro to launch Astro Wah Lai Toi. It benefits over 100 million HK dollars every year from Astro by providing 85% programs on primetime slots. Moreover, TVB is the advertising agency of Astro Wah Lai Toi and offers counselling service for it.

Astro had been mistaken for holding an exclusive right as the sole pay-TV service in Malaysia to broadcast TVB programmes; rather, it holds such right to broadcast TVB programmes on the entirety of one channel which it runs.

About 80% of the channel programmes were mirrored by Astro Zhi Zun HD until it was renamed to Astro Wah Lai Toi HD on 6 October 2014.

Astro Wah Lai Toi is made available for NJOI Prepaid from 3 June 2015 onwards.

Starting 1 April 2020, Astro Wah Lai Toi HD will begin to be exclusively available via On demand (VOD) and On the GO. Some of the successors of Astro Wah Lai Toi HD are TVB Jade Malaysia (Channel 310) and Astro AOD HD (Channel 311, SD On Channel 351).

As of 1 May 2020, Astro Wah Lai Toi HD has been completely transitioned as On Demand channels, which include all of the channel's original series aired in complete boxsets.

As for 1 May 2024, Astro Wah Lai Toi On Demand has been discontinued, all of Hong Kong Cantonese content was moved to Astro QJ and local Cantonese content with some of Astro Wah Lai Toi key programming such as Astro Star Quest will be change to Mandarin on Astro AEC. This change marks the end of Astro Wah Lai Toi as a brand.

== Programming ==
Astro Wah Lai Toi started to air programmes that were used by TVB to fight against Asia Television Limited. The first show was Healing Souls which was outsourced by Asia Television Limited.

=== Astro Wah Lai Toi Drama Awards ===
Since 2004, Astro Wah Lai Toi have held Astro Wah Lai Toi Drama Awards every year. All the awards receivers are 100% voted by the audiences. Astro Wah Lai Toi selected the TVB dramas that were played that year and published the nominated list at an appropriate time. Usually the dramas Astro Wah Lai Toi played were the ones HK Jade played in the previous year. For instance, the dramas Astro Wah Lai Toi played in 2007 was the ones that have been played in 2006. The award was succeeded by My AOD Favourites Awards and TVB Star Awards Malaysia in 2010 and 2013, respectively. Furthermore, Astro Wah Lai Toi also holds many major events, such as Astro Star Quest, Miss Astro Chinese International Pageant, Astro Wah Lai Toi Drama Awards, etc.

=== Live programmes ===
Astro Wah Lai Toi broadcasts HK major live events, but all charity programmes held by TVB are broadcast live by another channel which is Astro On Demand.
