= Astro Hua Hee Dai =

Malaysian television channel

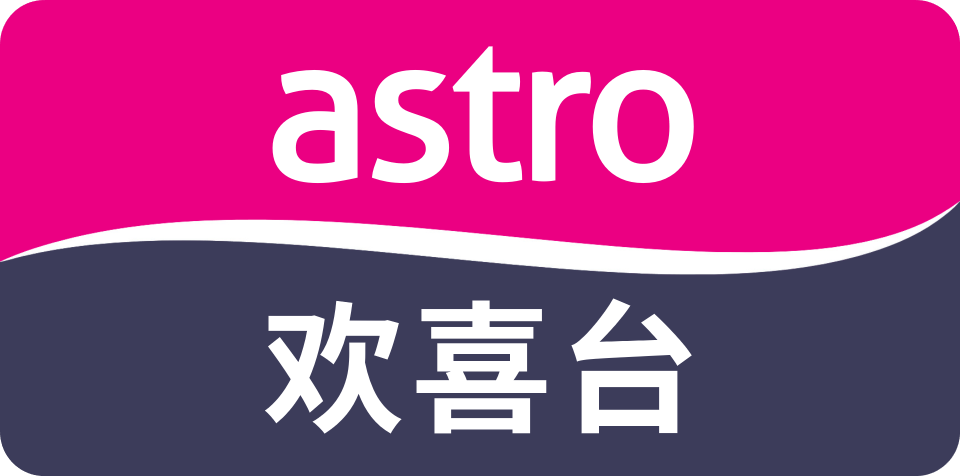
- Country: Malaysia
- Broadcast area: Malaysia
- Headquarters: Bukit Jalil, Kuala Lumpur, Malaysia

Programming
- Languages: Hokkien, Mandarin
- Picture format: 16:9 HDTV (1080i)

Ownership
- Owner: Astro
- Sister channels: Astro AEC; Astro AOD; Astro QJ

History
- Launched: 13 October 2007; 18 years ago

Astro Hua Hee Dai
- Traditional Chinese: Astro 歡喜台
- Simplified Chinese: Astro 欢喜台
Transcriptions
Standard Mandarin
- Hanyu Pinyin: Astro Huānxǐ Tái
Southern Min
- Hokkien POJ: Astro Hoaⁿ-hí-tâi

Astro Hua Hee Dai (Chinese: Astro 欢喜台; also known as Astro HHD) is a 24-hour in-house Hokkien-generic TV channel in Malaysia. It is the fourth in-house Chinese channel provided by pay TV provider Astro, after Astro Wah Lai Toi, Astro AEC and Astro Shuang Xing, and was launched on 13 October 2007 with other channels such as Astro Xiao Tai Yang, Asian Food Channel and KBS World. Bahasa Malaysia subtitles are provided.

On June 24, 2013, a HD version of this channel debuted. The two services only simulcast about half their content until 2016. The SD feed was closed in 2021.

== Logo history ==
Astro Hua Hee Dai HD logo (June 24, 2013 - November 14, 2024

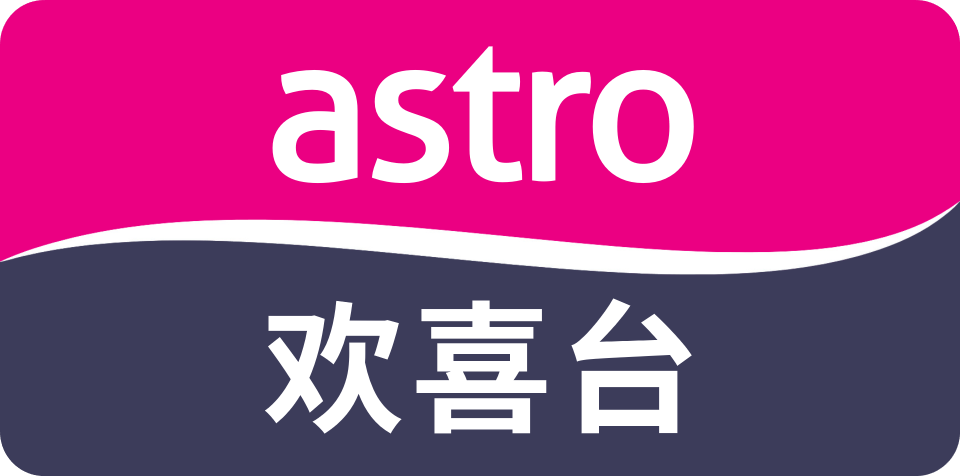
Astro Hua Hee Dai logo used since November 15, 2024
