= Come Home Love: Lo and Behold =

2017 Hong Kong daily half-hour TVB sitcom

- 愛·回家之開心速遞
- Genre: Comedy
- Created by: Hong Kong Television Broadcasts Limited
- Starring: Lau Dan; Angela Tong; Koni Lui; Pal Sinn; Andrea So; Joyce Tang; Kalok Chow; Law Lok-lam; Ricco Ng; Hoffman Cheng; Mandy Lam; Terry Li; Jimmy Au
- Opening theme: Latin Soul Strut (episodes 1-224); "In My Heart" by Jacqueline Wong (episodes 225-605, instrumental version from episode 557 onwards); " 開心速遞” (Happy Courier) by the cast of the drama (episode 606-1326); "愛心灌溉" (Filled with Love) by Joey Wong JW (episodes 1327-2326); "這個家" (This Family) by Chantel Yiu (episodes 2327-2868)
- Country of origin: Hong Kong
- Original language: Cantonese
- No. of episodes: 2868

Production
- Editors: Hong Kong Macao Zhuhai, Mainland China
- Running time: 30 minutes(including commercials and trailer)
- Production company: TVB

Original release
- Network: Jade
- Release: February 20, 2017 – August 7, 2026

Related
- Come Home Love; Come Home Love 2 Come Home Love: Dinner at 8 Park Yoho Weekend Express

Come Home Love: Lo and Behold (Chinese: 愛·回家之開心速遞; literally "Love Returning Home, Happy Delivery"), alternately known as Come Home Love: Happy Courier, was a 2017 daily half-hour Hong Kong sitcom created by TVB, starring Lau Dan, Angela Tong, Koni Lui, Stanley Cheung, Pal Sinn, Mandy Lam, Andrea So, Joyce Tang and Kalok Chow. It is produced by Law Chun-ngok who also produced the three previous Come Home Love.

Filming began in January 2017 and is filmed as it airs. The series premiered on February 20, 2017, airing every Monday through Friday on Hong Kong's TVB Jade, Malaysia's Astro Wah Lai Toi and Australia's TVB channels during its 8:00-8:30 pm timeslot, with an expected 180 episodes. Due to the show's popularity and high ratings, it has since been extended to 900 episodes and now airs six days a week (excluding Saturday). In September 2020 the show aired its one-thousandth episode, exceeding the episode count of the first series. Additionally, it exceeded A Kindred Spirit's episode count (when aired as a sitcom) when its 1128th episode aired, making it one of the longest running drama shows in Hong Kong television history.

Its last episode was aired on August 7, 2026, and it will be continued with a successor of the show, Come Home Love: Like Mother, Like Daughter

== Premise ==
The story revolves around the Hung and Lung family, their work lives and friends, and in earlier episodes Lung King Fung's spirit that the Hung family befriends as one of the family.

Hung Shu Kan (Lau Dan) is the head of the Hung (Chinese: 熊) family and also the owner of a transport company. Kan's younger brother Hung Shu Yan (Pal Sinn), is a photographer who comes to live with Kan. Other members of the Hung family: eldest daughter Hung Sheung Sin (Joyce Tang) who is away in the United States but later returns home; assistant manager of marketing and second daughter, Mary Hung Yeuk Shui (Koni Lui); University student and youngest daughter, Hung Sum Yu (Andrea So); and University student and son of the eldest daughter, Kam Shing On (Kalok Chow).

Early episodes focused on Lung King Fung (Andrew Chan), a rich heir who "died" in a car accident just as Shu Yan was taking pictures nearby. Fung's spirit was transferred into the camera; only the Hung family and certain others who touch the camera can see Fung.

== Cast ==
=== Hung Family ===
Actor / Actress	Role	Description
Lau Dan	Hung Shu Kun	Husband of Mrs Hung; Elder brother of Hung Shu Yan; Father of Hung Sheung Sin, Mary Hung, and Hung Shum Yu; Grandfather of Kam Shing On; Former brother-in-law of David Ko; Colleague and competitor of Chi Fu; Boss and friend of Chun Pok Sze; Fan of Yeung Na Na; Built a family-like relationship with Lung King Fung
Samantha Chuk Man Kwan	Mrs Hung	Deceased wife of Hung Shu Kun; Deceased sister-in-law of Hung Shu Yan; Deceased mother of Hung Sheung Sin, Mary Hung and Hung Shum Yu; Dead Grandmother of Kam Shing On; Deceased former sister-in-law of David Ko
Pal Sinn	Hung Shu Yan	Photographer of Junbo Net Online Shop since Episode 34; Younger brother of Hung Shu Kun; Uncle of Hung Sheung Sin, Mary Hung and Hung Shum Yu; Granduncle of Kam Shing On; Former war correspondent Friend of Lung King Fung, build a family-like relationship with him Former husband of David Ko, only Kenny Chow knows their marriage, discovered by Heidi Hau in Episode 34, blabbed carelessly in Episode 89, got back together with David in Episode 115; Photography teacher of Chu Ling Ling; Friend and former crush of Kenny Chow; Crush of Ho Pik Wan; Friend of Cheung Kwan
Joyce Tang	Hung Sheung Sin	Born in 1972 middle level Eldest daughter of Hung Shu Kun and Mrs Hung; Author and Screenwriter; Girlfriend of Kam Shing Mo, separated in 1995; Mother and university classmate of Kam Shing On; Eldest niece of Hung Shu Yan; Eldest sister of Mary Hung; Eldest sister and university schoolmate of Hung Shum Yu; Secondary school big sister of David Ko, stopped because of Kam Shing Mo (Brian Tse) in 1995; Mentor of Chun Pok Sze and Bonnie Tam; University classmate of Danny Chan Pak Keung
Koni Lui	Hung Yeuk Shui Mary Hung	Second Daughter of Hung Shu Kun Team Lead of Wai Lung Department Store operations Wife of Kung Yip Elder sister of Hung Shum Yu Younger sister of Hung Sheung Sin Niece of Hung Shu Yan Aunt to Kam Shing On Friend of Lung King Fung, build a family-like relationship with him
Andrea So	Hung Sum Yu	Youngest Daughter of Hung Shu Kun Graduated from Hong Kong Island University Younger sister of Hung Sheung Sin and Hung Yeuk Shui Niece of Hung Shu Yan Aunt to Kam Shing On Friend of Lung King Fung, build a family-like relationship with him ex-Business Partner with George Wong of academy Leaves HK to pursue biotech business
Kalok Chow	Kam Shing On	Son of Hung Sheung Sin and Kam Shing Mo Grandson of Hung Shu Kun Great maternal nephew of Hung Shu Yan Maternal nephew of Hung Yeuk Shui and Hung Sum Yu Psychology student at Hong Kong Island University Ex-Boyfriend of Bonnie Tam Friend of Lung King Fung, build a family-like relationship with him Part-time employee at Good Father Bar, Genius Academy, and Chiu Wai Film Making Company Full-time employee at Hong Kong consulate for Gu Lei Mu Island

=== Lung Family ===
Actor / Actress	Role	Description
Law Lok-lam	Lung Kam Wai	Boss of Wai Lung Company; Husband of Ann Ng, Melody Sheh, and Cindy Pak; Brother-in-law of KC Ng; Father of Linda, Terry, Max, Joe, Fung and Vivian Lung
Chung Chi Kwong	Lung Kam Kai	Boss of First Love Cafe; Younger brother of Lung Gam Wai; Uncle of Linda and Terry Worked with Ivan Chan to start Zip Lung Secret website
Andrew Chan Tsun Ting	Lung King Fung	Son of Lung Kam Wai; Half-brother to Linda, Max, Joe, Fung and Vivian Friend of Hung family, build a family-like relationship with them Crush of Hung Sum Yu Wai Lung E-commerce department in-store manager Takes over as lead (from brother Max) of Wai Lung Supermarket

==== First Chamber ====
Actor / Actress	Role	Description
Esther Wan / Mandy Lam (young)	Ann Ng Ka Yau	Deceased mother of Linda and Terry Lung; Older sister of KC
Mandy Lam	Linda Lung Lik Lin	Eldest child and eldest daughter of Lung Kam Wai; Elder sister of Terry Lung, elder half-sister to Max, Joe, Fung and Vivian Lung; Maternal niece of KC Ng; CFO and CEO at Zip Lung Group; Part owner of Good Father Bar with Song Shui Fai; Wife of Sung Shui Fai; Donated liver to father Lung Kam Wai
Kim Li	Terry Lung Lik Wong	Second son of Lung Kam Wai; Younger brother of Linda Lung, half-brother to Max, Joe, Fung and Vivian Lung; Maternal nephew of KC Ng; Shares same birth date as half-brother Max; Actor at Chiu Wai Film Making Company
Jimmy Au	KC Ng Ka Chung	Younger brother of Ann Ng, maternal uncle of Linda and Terry Lung, brother-in-law to Lung Kam Wai; Lawyer at Zip Lung Group; Former boyfriend of Helen Shum, Icy, and Rachel
Jack Hui	Sung Shui Fai	Husband of Linda Lik Lien; Director of Wai Lung restaurant division, former employee of Wai Lung Department store operations team Good Ba Bar proprietor
Dylan Leung	Philip 仔 / Philip Sung	Son of Sung Shui Fai, student at Moral Rebuilding Primary School, stepson of Linda Lung Lik Lin

==== Second Chamber ====
Actor / Actress	Role	Description
Cecelia So	Melody Sheh Sau Kam	Second wife of Lung Kam Wai; Mother of Max Lung; Ex Mother-in-law to Jenny Lui
Kitty Lau	Kitty Sheh	Sister of Melody Caretaker at Zip Lung Building
Jennifer Shum	Icy Yu Oi Sze	Cousin of Melody; Former secretary of Lung Gam Wai ex-Girlfriend of KC Ng
Hoffman Cheng	Max Lung Lik Sze	Son of Lung Gam Wai and Melody Sheh; Ex-Husband of Jenny Lui; Half-brother of Linda, Terry, Joe, Fung and Vivian Lung Boyfriend of Luna Siu (also his secretary)
Vicky Chan	Jenny Lui Chun Nei	Daughter of Lui Kung; Ex-Wife of Max Lung; Former Daughter-in-law of Lung Kam Wai; Former sexual partner of John Wu

==== Third Chamber ====
Actor / Actress	Role	Description
Amy Fan Yik Man	Cindy Pak Tin Ngo	Third wife of Lung Gam Wai; Mother of Vivian and Joe Lung
Rock Ho	Joe Lung Chau	Son of Cindy Pak and Lung Kam Wai; Twin brother of Vivian Lung; Half-brother of Linda, Terry, and Max and Fung Lung University student in UK who returns to Hong Kong; Works in Wai Lung IT Department Ex-Boyfriend of 餃餃
Katherine He	Vivian Lung Chok Mat	Daughter of Cindy Pak and Lung Gam Wai; Twin sister of Joe Lung; Half-sister of Linda, Terry, and Max and Fung Lung; Student at the University of Hong Kong Island; Worked at Not Lao Deli

=== Fourth Chamber ===
Actor / Actress	Role	Description
Ho Yee Wan	Mia; Ma Mei Na; Ma 姐	Fourth wife of Lung Gam Wai, later ex-wife Director of Operations, New Wai Lung Plaza; Best friends with Mary, Rebecca, Helen, and David

=== Zip Lung Group / Wai Lung Department Store ===
- Angela Tong as Ko Pak Fei / David Ko, girlfriend of Hung Shu Yan, E-commerce Director and Head of Wai Lung E-commerce department, aka Jumbo Net
- Kiko Leung as Anita / Kong Wai Kiu, sister of Venus, worked at Wai Lung Department store operations team, former life insurance salesperson
- Peter Lai as Ma Pau, works on Wai Lung Department store operations team, landlord of David Ko
- Joey Miu Ka Hing as Kwai Suk Ming, works on Wai Lung Department store operations team, IT specialist
- Edsel Chiu Ho Ming as Ying Chun, works on Wai Lung Department store operations team
- Veronica Shiu as Hau Choi Yan / Yan Yan / Heidi, former personal assistant to David, former girlfriend to Ivan
- Jan Tse Chi Lun as Mandy / Lam Mei Heung, Linda Lung Lik Lin's former secretary, best friend of Mary Hung Yeuk Shui, girlfriend of Chun Pok Sze, studying law in England
- Cinda Hui Sze Man as 群姐 aka Isabella, Head caretaker of Zip Lung Building, close friend of KC Ng
- Stanley Cheung as Kung Yip, Marketing Director of Zip Lung Group, husband of Mary Hung Yuk Shui
- Lisa Lau as Yeung Yeung, worked for Kung Yip in Zip Ling Marketing, ex-girlfriend of Chun Wah
- Eileen Yeow as Helen Shum, HR Director at Zip Lung, former girlfriend of KC Ng, former girlfriend of John Wu
- Janice Shum as Rebecca / Yip Pik Ka, Executive Secretary of Lung Kam Wai, girlfriend of Wai Lung Shopping Centre Security Guard Cheung Lung, ex-HR Manager at Zip Lung, ex-fiancée of Chan Siu Kuen, broke up with him after he said he didn't love her.
- Andy Wong as Chan Siu Kuen aka Iron Face Chan, Head of Security at Zip Lung, former fiancé of Rebecca Yip, former student of Headmaster Tam
- Jim Tang as Ivan Chan / Router, Head of Zip Lung Group IT department, boyfriend of May, was initially in fake relationship with May (Kung Yip's former girlfriend before Mary Hung), developed Zip Lung Secret website for Lung Kam Kai
- David Do as Peter Kwan Pei Tak, boyfriend of Mia Ma, used to work with Andy Lau Tak Wah, distant relative of Melody Sheh Sau Kam
- Tony Chui as Andy Lau Tak Wah, worked for Peter Kwan Bei Dut, ex-boyfriend of Elaine
- Danny Lo as Chun Wah, Finance Accountant Director at Zip Lung Group finance department, reported to Linda Lung Lik Lin, ex-boyfriend of Yeung Yeung
- Gregory Lee as Ho, works at First Love Cafe
- Denice Lam as Natalie / Law Lai, works at First Love Cafe, former delivery service woman
- Candice Chiu as May / Hei Seung Fei, ex-girlfriend of Ivan Chan and Kung Yip, ex-secretary for Linda Lung Lik Lin
- Phoebe Chow as Tam Ho Ching aka 垃圾清 "Garbage" Ching, ex-secretary of Linda Lung Lik Lin
- Stephen Ho as John Wu King Tang, was Director of Legal Affairs at Zip Lung, now works at Dei Lui Holdings, ex-boyfriend of Helen Shum Kai Yi, best friend of KC Ng Ka Chung
- DaDa Wong Chi Hang as Choi Yuk Kau, Joe Lung's girlfriend, ex-secretary of Sung Sui Fai, ex-secretary of Max Lung Lik See
- Terrence Wong as Cheung Lung, Security guard at Wai Lung Shopping Centre, boyfriend of Rebecca Yip
- Stephanie Lee as Elaine, works at Wai Lung Department Store, ex-girlfriend of Andy Lau
- Raymond Cho as Chan Wing Lim, worked at First Love Cafe, younger brother of Mr. Chan, brother-in-law of Chan Mui Chu 陳師奶
- Roxanne Ho as Luna Siu, girlfriend and former secretary of Max Lung
- Yvonne Ho as Mah Jie

=== Speedy Bear Delivery Service ===
- Mark Ma Kwun Tung as Chun Pok Sze, godson of Hung Shu Kun, Hung family friend, childhood friend of Mary Hung Yeuk Shui, boyfriend of Mandy Lam Mei Heung
- Chun Kai Wai as Ng Sai Lik, employee at Speedy Bear
- Vincent Cheung as Tai Lik, employee at Speedy Bear

=== Hong Kong Island University ===
- Kalok Chow as 金城安 Kam Shing On, son of Hung Sheung Sin
- Ricco Ng as 朱凌凌 Chu Ling Ling, Shing On's best friend, aspiring film maker, junior director at Chiu Wai Film Making Company, apprentice of Hung Shu Yan
- Sky Chiu as 艾頓壯 Ai Ton Chong aka Ah Chong, management intern at Zip Lung Sanitation Department (formerly in Security Department)
- Aaryn Cheung as 王國 George Wong, ex-academy business partner of Hung Sum Yu, dorm roommate of Chi Ji Hao, sold academy shares to Linda Lung
- Cheung Sze Yan as Lee Mok Sau, love struck stalker of Chu Ling Ling, actuarial science student.
- Judy Kwong as Venus Kong Pak Wai, ex-girlfriend of Chi Ji Hau, younger sister of Anita Kong (Wai Lung Department store)
- Sophie Yip as Candy
- Keefe Ng as 頭皮 "Dandruff"
- Tom Lo as Oily Face 面油
- Oman Lam as Bookworm 書蟲

=== Chiu Wai Film Making Company ===
- Andrew Yuen as 潮偉 Chiu Wai, owner and founder of Chiu Wai Film Making Company, Hung Sheung Sin's boyfriend
- William Chu as Sing, personal assistant to Chiu Wai
- Lee Kai Kit as Director
- Kinlas Chan as Assistant Director to Director
- Keefe Ng as 頭皮 "Dandruff", production assistant

=== Chi Family / Tai Chi ===
- Ricky Wong as Chi Fu, father of Chi Tsz Hau and Chi Mei Lai, Hung Shu Kun's rival
- Hero Yuen as Chi Tsz Hau, son of Chi Fu, part-time driver/bodyguard of Lung Kam Wai, boyfriend of Liza, ex-boyfriend of Venus and Hung Shum Yu, student at Hong Kong Island University, dorm roommate of George Wong, kung fu student of Hung Shu Kun
- Kitty Chung as Chi Mei Lai, daughter of Chi Fu. She had a crush on Kam Sing On and was once love-rival of Bonnie

=== Chu Family ===
- John Chan as Martin Chu Chin, father of Chu Ling Ling and Chu Tin Tai, partner at law firm, owns family house in Macau
- Kelvin Leung as Chu Tin Tai, second son of Martin Chu Chin, older brother of Chu Ling Ling, lawyer who works for Chu Chin's firm, passion is making HK style pineapple buns

=== Tam Family ===
- Wing Chun Chan as Headmaster 譚道德 Tam To Tak, father of Bonnie; headmaster of Moral Rebuilding Primary School
- Helen Ng as Tam Ho Yung Yee, mother of Bonnie, works as junior high school headmaster
- Iris Lam as Bonnie / Tam Yuk Ying, girlfriend of idol 葱頭, ex-girlfriend of Kam Shing On, student at Hong Kong Island University, apprentice of Hung Sheung Sin for screen-writing

=== Genius Academy (closed) ===
- Andrea So as Hung Sum Yu, co-owner and founder, ex-business partner of George Wong
- Sophie Yip as Candy, teacher. Opened own nail salon beside June's tarot card reading service after closing of academy
- Tom Lo as Oily Face 面油, teacher
- Oman Lam as Bookworm 書蟲, teacher
- Kelly Gu as June, tarot card expert, relied upon by Linda Lung for tarot card expertise

=== Building Residents ===
- Helen Sun Wai Lin as Chan Mui Chu aka 食屎陳師奶 aka 陳師奶 "Mrs. Chan"
- Wong Chi Wing as 陳生 Mr. Chan, husband of 陳師奶
- Carisa Yan as Miss Ko
- Lesley Chiang as Liza, girlfriend of Chi Ji Hao, Filipino housekeeper of Miss Ko
- Keith Ng Shui Ting as Mr. Lo
- Andrew Chan as Lung King Fung, lives in unit owned by Lung Kam Wai
- Sky Chiu as 艾頓壯 Ai Ton Chong, roommate of Lung King Fung
- Ricco Ng as 朱凌凌 Chu Ling Ling, roommate of Lung King Fung

=== Other Key Recurring Characters ===
- Kings Wong as Big Chen, Lung Kam Wai's rival and adversary
- Jason Pai as Lui Gung, father of Jenny Lui, wealthy owner of Dei Lui Holdings, adversary of Lam Kam Wai
- Adrien Yau as 葱頭 "Onion Head", singer idol and actor, boyfriend of Bonnie Tam
- Man Yeung Ching Wah as Dr. Man
- Yvonne Lam as Ceci, Mrs. Ronaldo, wealthy businesswoman, frequent business partner of Zip Lung Holdings
- Julian Gaertner as Mr. Ronaldo, husband of Mrs. Ronaldo, MMA fighter, has competed against Hung Shu Kan in both MMA and fencing
- Penny Chan as Dino, Filipino bodyguard for Lui Gung, former boyfriend of Liza

== Notes ==
- Michael Miu and Michelle Yim appeared as a cameo as themselves in episode 997 as spokesperson.
- Bobby Au-Yeung appeared as a cameo "Bobby" on episodes 606 (Ending only) and 607.
- On episode 606, the new theme song was sung by the cast.
- The weekend of June 21, 2019, the cast held a meeting and made a notice to the public about the theme song's change.
