= Communion (TV series) =

2022 Hong Kong television series

- Also known as: 回歸
- Genre: Family; Romance
- Written by: Cheung Sai-cheung
- Directed by: Wong Chi-wah; Leung Kai-ching; Chan Kong-hung; Ng Chiu-wing
- Starring: Roger Kwok; Alice Chan; Ricco Ng; Kalok Chow
- Opening theme: "One Water Two Ways (一水兩方)" by Gigi Yim
- Country of origin: Hong Kong
- Original language: Cantonese
- No. of episodes: 15

Production
- Producer: Lam Chi-wah
- Production location: Hong Kong
- Running time: 43 minutes
- Production company: TVB

Original release
- Network: TVB Jade; myTV Super
- Release: 11 July – 29 July 2022

Communion (Chinese: 回歸) is a Hong Kong family drama television series produced by TVB to mark the 25th anniversary of the handover of Hong Kong. Airing in July 2022, the 15-episode series stars Roger Kwok and Alice Chan, alongside Ricco Ng and Kalok Chow. The plot centers on a divorced couple and their two sons, as they navigate a trademark dispute over their family restaurant business while the sons compete in a technology entrepreneurship competition. Produced by Lam Chi-wah, the series explores themes of intergenerational cooperation and family reconciliation, highlighting the tension between traditional practices and contemporary innovation. The narrative is complemented by a one-episode prequel, Silver Lining, featuring Matthew Ho and Hera Chan as the younger versions of the protagonists.

== Cast ==
=== The Au Family ===
- Roger Kwok as Au Yiu-cho: The owner and head chef of Yuet Tak House in Hong Kong.
  - Matthew Ho as young Yiu-cho. Both actors trained under a traditional master to learn wok-tossing for their chef roles.
- Alice Chan as Tang Lai-kuen: Yiu-cho's ex-wife and a successful entrepreneur who founded a mainland Chinese restaurant chain. Chan described her character as having "significant emotional baggage" requiring a nuanced performance.
  - Hera Chan as young Lai-kuen.
- Ricco Ng as Au Ka-him: The elder son and an IT business owner who was raised by Lai-kuen in mainland China.
- Kalok Chow as Au Ka-kin: The younger son and an aspiring app developer raised by Yiu-cho in Hong Kong.
- Erica Chan as Ling Hau-yiu: Yiu-cho's adopted daughter.

=== Business and Technology Associates ===
- Kayan Au as On Yeuk-tung: Ka-him's personal assistant.
- Joey Thye as Cheung Loi: An app developer and competitor to Ka-kin.
- Tsui Wing as Ma Chi-to: A shareholder in Lai-kuen's company.
- Shek Sau as Cheng Chi-ho: The chairman and majority shareholder of Lai-kuen's company.

=== Staff at Yiu-cho's Yuet Tak House ===
- Mark Ma as Lo Fung-nin
- Jason Lau as Lui Tin
- Lee Shing-cheong as Gam Zin-fai
- Strawberry Yeung as Yim Wai-mui
- Man Yeung as Sung Yan-biu
- Ngai Wai-man as Yeung Kwok-keung
- Vincent Cheung as Chau Yat-ting

== Plot ==
The series centers on Au Yiu-cho (Roger Kwok) and Tang Lai-kuen (Alice Chan), a divorced couple living in Hong Kong and mainland China, respectively. Yiu-cho operates the traditional Cantonese restaurant Yuet Tak House, while Lai-kuen has established a large-scale business empire under the same brand name. Their sons are also separated by the divorce; the elder, IT expert Ka-him (Ricco Ng), lives with Lai-kuen, while the younger, aspiring developer Ka-kin (Kalok Chow), remains with Yiu-cho.

Conflict begins when Lai-kuen returns to Hong Kong to expand her franchise, triggering a legal battle over the Yuet Tak House trademark. This rivalry coincides with a technology entrepreneurship competition in which Ka-him mentors Ka-kin, forcing the family to balance professional competition with personal grievances.

During the litigation, Yiu-cho's original restaurant faces temporary closure due to shareholder interference. The conflict culminates when a money-laundering scheme is discovered within Lai-kuen's company involving Ka-kin's metaverse project. Working together, the family exposes the corporate corruption, allowing Lai-kuen to regain control of her company. Following the resolution of the criminal case, the sons use their virtual reality platform to help their parents revisit shared memories and facilitate a reconciliation, resulting in the merger of the two restaurant brands.

== Production and theme ==
The series, produced by Lam Chi-wah with scripts supervised by Cheung Sai-cheung and a rotating team of directors, was created to mark the 25th anniversary of the Hong Kong handover. According to Lam, it depicts a fictional family saga to illustrate the "diligence and resilience" of the Hong Kong people, integrating events such as the 1997 Asian financial crisis and the development of the Guangdong–Hong Kong–Macao Greater Bay Area. The production aimed to balance historical context and emotional depth with dramatic appeal.

The script adopts a naturalistic approach, using collective memories of the handover as narrative drivers rather than overt exposition. It emphasizes intergenerational cooperation and the resolution of long-standing familial conflicts. Lam noted that the narrative reflects the complexities of human relationships, where external circumstances can prolong misunderstandings; some conflicts are resolved quickly, while others require sustained mutual understanding.

The production team spent four months developing a digital recreation of the Yuet Tak House restaurant, incorporating detailed interior renderings and custom avatars for the cast. In the finale's metaverse reconciliation scene, virtual reality and motion capture technologies were employed to integrate the actors' performances into the virtual environment. Alice Chan discussed the technical challenges of the scene, noting that the actors relied heavily on their imagination while filming.

== Music ==
Track Listing
No.	Title	Lyrics	Music	Artist(s)	Length
1.	"One Water Two Ways (一水兩方)"	Hayes Yeung	Alex Lau	Gigi Yim	3:57

== Ratings and reception ==
Writing for HK01, Lam Chun-king noted that the series benefited from a focused and "emotionally cohesive" narrative by stripping away unnecessary subplots. They praised the drama's exploration of "eight types of sentiment," highlighting the nuanced performances of veterans Roger Kwok and Alice Chan. The review added that while the drama may feel "old-fashioned" and lack excitement for younger viewers, its nostalgic portrayal of relationships resonates strongly with older audiences. The series achieved a peak rating of 21 points, representing an audience of approximately 1.36 million viewers.

Week	Episodes	Airing dates	Ratings (Note: According to Hong Kong's TV rating system, each rating point represents approximately 64,670 viewers.)	Ref.
1	1 – 5	11–15 July 2022	17.2 points	
2	6 – 10	18–22 July 2022	17.6 points	
3	11 – 15	25–29 July 2022	21 points	

== Awards and nominations ==
Year	Award	Category	Nominated work	Results	Ref.
2022	55th TVB Anniversary Awards	Best Television Series	Communion	Nominated	
2022	55th TVB Anniversary Awards	Best Actress	Alice Chan	Nominated	
2022	55th TVB Anniversary Awards	Best Supporting Actor	Ricco Ng	Nominated	
2022	55th TVB Anniversary Awards	Best Television Theme song	"One Water Two Ways" (by Gigi Yim)	Nominated	

== Related show ==
Promotional poster for the prequel, Silver Lining, featuring Matthew Ho and Hera Chan

Silver Lining (Chinese: 回歸光影頌：曙光) is a one-episode prequel special starring Matthew Ho and Hera Chan as the younger versions of Au Yiu-cho and Tang Lai-kuen. Set in 1997, the episode depicts the couple's early years as they assume control of the Cantonese restaurant Yuet Tak House. The narrative explores the impact of the Asian financial crisis on their business and the marital tensions that arise after Lai-kuen purchases a property without Yiu-cho's knowledge—an event established in the main series as the catalyst for their divorce. To characterize the couple's relationship, the production incorporates George Lam's 1980 single "Every Minute I Need You" (分分鐘需要你) as a recurring musical motif. Producer Lam Chi-wah commended Chan's performance, specifically citing her execution of complex emotional transitions during a high-conflict scene filmed in a single take. The special was broadcast on 8 July 2022 and garnered 15 rating points, representing approximately 970,000 viewers.
