= Come Home Love =

Hong Kong TV series

- Official poster
- 愛·回家
- Genre: Modern Sitcom
- Created by: Hong Kong Television Broadcasts Limited
- Written by: Shiu Lai King, Sin Chiu Ching, Kwan Bing Hung, Liu Cheng Ching, Tsang Hon, Leung Chi Yin, Ma Chuan Ying, Lau Wai Kit, Yip Gwong Yam, Koo Yi Lai, Lo Yuan Ha, Lee Bak Wai, Wong Chi Yan, Liu Sau Lin, Ho Sai Kit, Yeung Cung Bak, Yuan Bo Wai, Chan Ho Yee, Man Yue Han
- Directed by: Chan Chi Gwong, Wong Yu Lok, Cheng Wing Ciu, Sin Yin Fong, Chan Siu Ling, Wong Wai Yip, Cheung Wing Ho
- Starring: Lau Dan, Tsui Wing, Lai Lok-yi, Yvonne Lam, Florence Kwok, Carlo Ng, Angel Chiang, Joey Law, Queenie Chu, Geoffrey Wong, Glen Lee, Max Cheung, Steve Lee, Lisa Chong; Griselda Yeung, Yeewan Ho, Raymond Chiu, Celine Ma, William Chu, Auston Lam, Samantha Ko, Jimmy Au
- Theme music composer: Joyce Cheng
- Opening theme: Embrace Love (擁抱愛) by Joyce Cheng
- Country of origin: Hong Kong
- Original language: Cantonese
- No. of seasons: 2
- No. of episodes: 804

Production
- Executive producer: Catherine Tsang
- Producer: Tsui Yu On
- Production locations: Hong Kong; Macao; Shantou. China
- Editors: Sandy Shaw; Hum Chui Chen
- Camera setup: Multi-camera
- Running time: 22 minutes (without commercial)
- Production company: TVB

Original release
- Network: TVB Jade, HD Jade
- Release: 14 May 2012 – 3 July 2015

Related
- Come Home Love 2 (Ep. 805-995); Come Home Love: Dinner at 8 Come Home Love: Lo and Behold

Come Home Love
- Chinese: 愛·回家
- Literal meaning: "Love, Return Home"
Transcriptions
Standard Mandarin
- Hanyu Pinyin: Ài·Huí Jiā
Yue: Cantonese
- Jyutping: Oi3 Wui4 Gaa1

Come Home Love (Chinese: 愛·回家; Jyutping: Oi3 Wui4 Gaa1; literally "Love, Return Home") is a Hong Kong sitcom created and produced by TVB. Premiering on TVB Jade on May 14, 2012, the series was originally intended for 180 episodes but extended multiple times, before finally concluding in July 2015 with a total of 804 episodes. The sitcom was broadcast on TVB Jade and HD Jade every Monday through Friday during its 8:00-8:30 pm timeslot.

In February 2015, TVB announced plans to end the series so the cast and production team could move on to other projects. However, the series' positive ratings led to a spin-off series with a whole new cast and production team. The spinoff series was first broadcast on July 6, 2015, with the only returning cast members being Lai Lok-yi, Max Cheung, Griselda Yeung and Geoffrey Wong, who play minor roles in the second series.

In 2020, the cast received the Lifetime Achievement Award at the 2020 TVB Anniversary Awards.

== Synopsis ==
The series revolves around the Ma family, an extended Chinese family living together in modern Hong Kong. The story also extends to the law firm youngest son John (Ma Chaung) works at.

Ma Fu (Lau Dan), is a retired Hong Kong Correctional Services officer. He is the patriarch of the Ma family and his traditional and disciplinarian approach to life creates both friction and solutions. The other members of the family are his much younger sister Ma Yau (Florence Kwok); second son and daughter-in-law, Ma Keung (Tsui Wing) and Lo Lai Sheung (Yvonne Lam); the deceased eldest son's Ma Gin's, children Ma Tse Yan (Joey Law) and Ma Tse Nei (Angel Chiang); and youngest son Ma Chuang (Lai Lok-yi).

== Cast ==
=== Main cast ===
- Lau Dan as Ma Fu (馬虎)

Head of the Ma family

- Tsui Wing as Ma Keung (馬強) & Ma Gin (馬健)

Fu's second son, married to Lai Sheung. Also adopted his deceased older brother's two kids, "Leslie" Tse Yan and "Tracy" Tse Nei.

- Yvonne Lam as Diana Lo Lai Sheung (勞麗嫦)

Keung's wife and adopted mother to Tse Yan and Tse Nei, and a wedding planner.

- Lai Lok-yi as John Ma Chong (馬壯)

Fu's youngest son, a legal executive, later lawyer.

- Florence Kwok as Angel Ma Yau (馬柔)

Fu's much younger sister, a coffee brewer and secret shopper.

- Carlo Ng as Jacky Leung Yin Fun (梁彥芬)

A Ma family friend and bakery manager in Macao, childhood friend of Angel.

- Angel Chiang as Tracy Ma Tse Nei (馬子妮)

Fu's granddaughter by his eldest son, a college student; she eventually works as a clerk at a law firm and as an amateur jewelry maker.

- Joey Law as Leslie Ma Tse Yan (馬子仁)

Fu's grandson by his eldest son, a fashion designer.

- Queenie Chu as Alex Wan Tak Yu (尹德如)

A barrister and John’s superior, later his girlfriend.

- Geoffrey Wong as Damon Cha Ka Sak (查嘉澤)

John's boss. He owns his own law firm.

- Glen Lee as Anthony Lau Sheung Yau (樓尚友)

Alex’s colleague and protege, Amanda's younger brother.

- Max Cheung as Richard Yim Gan (嚴謹)

A barrister. Eventually marries Fung Yin Ha.

- Griselda Yeung as Fung Yin Ha (馮嫣霞)

A barrister. Has a son from a previous marriage. Eventually marries Richard.

- Steve Lee as Leung Wing Hung (梁永洪)

Ma Keung's employee at the store.

- Lisa Chong as Heung Ching (向晴)

A legal clerk at the law firm

- Yeewan Ho as Maggie Koon May Kei (管美琪)

Damon Cha's personal secretary at the law firm.

- Raymond Chiu as Chung Biu (鍾標)

Ma Keung's former classmate.

- Celine Ma as So Bik (蘇碧)

A bartender at PushUp Bar.

- William Chu as Lee Chi Sing (李志成)

A legal executive and John's co-worker at the law firm. Si-Si's older brother.

- Auston Lam as Soeng Goon Fei (上官飛)

Ma Keung's employee at the store and a street performer who wants to be a singer.

=== Main recurring cast ===
- Eileen Yeow as Amanda Lau Seung Ho (樓尚好)
- Oceane Zhu as Sam Shiu Ching (岑水清)
- Helen Ma as Wan Suk Han (溫淑嫻)
- Kenny Wong as Eric Kau Nga Wik (裘亞域)
- Roxanne Tong as Lee Si Si (李思思)
- Jimmy Au as K.C. Liu Kai Chung (廖啟聰)
- Candice Chiu as Angel Liu Tung (呂瞳)
- Eddie Law as Wong Mau Dang (黄茂登)
- Katy Kung as Gem Kau Ah-Yuk (裘亞鈺)
- Matt Yeung as Jaden To Ngo Hang (任我行)
- Tim Cheng as Sau Wan Hoi (守雲開)
- Jerry Ku as Gino Bat Fan (畢凡)
- Samantha Ko as Lovely Ling Lei (凌俐)
- Owen Cheung as Ken Song Lai Kan (宋禮勤)
- Brian Tse as Alan Kei Wing Lun (祁詠倫)
- Jennifer Shum as San Ting Yee (申靜宜)
- Kayi Cheung as Isabella Leung Sai Yi (梁茜伊)
- Chow Chung as Chan Chung (陳聰)
- Eunis Sin as Chan Siu Nam (陳小楠)
- Yat-Fei Lau as Cou Zong (曹總)

=== Extended cast ===
- Wendy Hon as Choi Suk Gwan (蔡淑君)
- Claire Yiu as Ming Lee Mau Guen (李美娟)
- Chloe Nguyen as Pinky Ko Sau Ping (高秀蘋)
- Pauline Chow as Nicole Lai Chi Ling (賴芝玲)
- Kim Li as Terry Cheng Chi May (程志美)
- Kayee Tam as Situ Yun (司徒韻) ("V仔")
- Lily Leung as Laura Tsang-Lee Kap Kwan (李曾合群)
- Teresa Ha as Judy Ha-Yee Ho Ying (施夏浩縈)
- Ho Chun Hin as Haywood Chiu
- Kimmy Kwan as Samantha
- Rosella Lau as Ling Ko Nong (高寧)
- Lucy Li as Winnie
- Ip Ting Chi as Paula
- Gloria Chan as Mazie
- Ivana Wong as Emma Chu Oi Ma (朱愛瑪)
- Ricky Wong as Liu Mo (雷武)
- Nicole Wan as Heidi
- Snow Suen as Apple
- Kathy Fung as Tammy
- Candy Yuen as Lemon
- Doris Chow as Cherry
- Nicole Leung as Cherry #2
- Mandy Ho as Lily
- Annie Chong as Eva Lam
- Chiu Lok Yin as Andrew
- Andy Lau Tin Lung as Ben
- Hugo Wong as Calvin Ho
- So Lai Ming as Dora Wong
- Albert Cheung as Eric Cheung
- Esther Wan as Joyce
- Albert Law as Ka Tak Sik (賈德積)
- Christy Chan as Caty
- Helen Seng as Mandy
- Judy Tsang as Jamie & Gigi
- Wong Hong Kiu as Kiu (翹)
- Kimmi Tsui as Joey
- Alex Tse as Tyson
- Sam Tsang as Gilbert
- Julian Gaertner as Ronald
- Chuk Man Kwan as Manager Lo (魯經理)
- Kelvin Lee as Ching (青)
- Joey Mak as Amy
- Kanice Lau as Becky
- Vicky Chan as Carrie Lam
- Joseph Yeung as Andy Lo
- Jayden Kau as Brad
- Desmond Pang as Calvin Si
- Argus Ip as Tai (泰)
- Jacky Lei as Wah (華)
- Kelvin Yuen as Wah #2 (華第二)
- Kong Wing Fai as Leung Yin Chung (梁彥昌)
- Even Chan as Wing
- Shally Tsang as Paula Chan Bou Lai (陳寶拉)
- Sunny Tai as Morning Chan Ciu Jo (陳朝早)
- Louis Cheung
- Joyce Tang as Yu Sing Nam (余勝男)

== Music ==
=== Opening theme ===
No.	Title	Lyrics	Music	Singer(s)	Length
1.	"Embrace Love" (擁抱愛)	Sandy Chang	Joyce Cheng	Joyce Cheng	3:13

=== Sub themes ===
No.	Title	Lyrics	Music	Singer(s)	Length
1.	"The Puppet Said" (小木偶的話)	Sydney Sung	Auston Lam	Auston Lam	3:26
2.	"Betray" (騙徒)	Sydney Sung	Auston Lam	Auston Lam	3:31
3.	"Runaway" (逃出地球)	Sydney Sung	Auston Lam	Auston Lam	2:58
4.	"The Angel Said" (小天使的話)	Sydney Sung	Auston Lam	Auston Lam	3:59
5.	"No More Lies No More Tears" (不再說謊)	Sandy Chang	Auston Lam	Auston Lam	3:42
6.	"The Song of Puppet" (木偶歌)	Sydney Sung	Auston Lam	Auston Lam	4:21

== Development ==
TVB 2015 calendar, February. From left to right: Chris Lai, Joey Law, Tsui Wing, Lau Dan, Yvonne Lam, Florence Kwok, Kenny Wong

- The costume fitting ceremony was held on March 7, 2012, at 12:30 pm Tseung Kwan O TVB City Studio One. Original cast attendance included Lau Dan, Tsui Wing, Lai Lok Yi, Florence Kwok, Yvonne Lam, Joey Law, Angel Chiang, Queenie Chu, Carlo Ng, Yvonne Ho, Max Cheung, William Chu, Griselda Yeung, Lisa Ch'ng, Wong Chun Tong, Raymond Chiu, Lee Ka Ting, Auston Lam, Celine Ma, Jenny Lau, Apple Chan, Cheung Yin Chak, Hero Yuen, William Chak, and Hebe Chan.
- The series was originally intended to have 180 episodes. Due to solid ratings, TVB extended the series to 300 episodes in January 2013.
- Also in January 2013, Oceane Zhu whose character was originally a cameo was promoted to main cast due to her character being well received by audiences.
- With continued solid ratings and urging by audiences, TVB ordered an additional 200 episodes in May 2013. Totaling 500 episodes, the cast and crew held a banquet to celebrate the milestone.
- After extended the series multiple times because of solid ratings, TVB announced in February 2015 that they are planning to finally conclude the series even though the series is still doing well in the ratings.
- TVB originally planned to have certain cast members and the production crew collaborate again in a new sitcom series. Plans were scrapped, Instead a spin-off series with a whole new cast and crew was created. The second series retains the Come Home Love title, but will not have any major connections to the first series. Chris Lai, Max Cheung, Griselda Yeung and Geoffrey Wong are the only cast members to resume their characters in the second series. They will be playing minor roles in the new series.
- A promo image of Come Home Love was one of twelve series featured in TVB's 2015 calendar for the month of February.

== Viewership ratings ==
2012 Episode Ratings (Episode 1 — 166) (Week 1 — 34)
#	Timeslot (HKT)	Week	Episode(s)	Average points	Peaking points
1	Mon – Fri; 20:00－20:30	14–18 May 2012	1 — 5	25	29
2	Mon – Fri; 20:00－20:30	21–25 May 2012	6 — 10	24	
3	Mon – Fri; 20:00－20:30	28 May–1 Jun 2012	7 — 15	24	
4	Mon – Fri; 20:00－20:30	4–8 Jun 2012	16 — 20	24	
5	Mon – Fri; 20:00－20:30	11–15 Jun 2012	21 — 25	26	
6	Mon – Fri; 20:00－20:30	18–22 Jun 2012	26 — 30	25	
7	Mon – Fri; 20:00－20:30	25–29 Jun 2012	31 — 35	25	
8	Mon – Fri; 20:00－20:30	2–6 Jul 2012	36 — 40	25	
9	Mon – Fri; 20:00－20:30	9–13 Jul 2012	41 — 45	25	
10	Mon – Fri; 20:00－20:30	16–20 Jul 2012	46 — 50	26	
11	Mon – Fri; 20:00－20:30	23–27 Jul 2012	51 — 55	28	38 ^{1}
12	Mon – Fri; 20:00－20:30	30 Jul–3 Aug 2012	56 — 60	23	
13	Mon – Fri; 20:00－20:30	6–10 Aug 2012	61 — 65	23	
14	Mon – Fri; 20:00－20:30	13–17 Aug 2012	66 — 70	25	
15	Mon – Fri; 20:00－20:30	20–24 Aug 2012	71 — 75	24	
16	Mon – Fri; 20:00－20:30	27–31 Aug 2012	76 — 80	25	
17	Mon – Fri; 20:00－20:30	3–7 Sep 2012	81 — 85	26	
18	Mon – Fri; 20:00－20:30	10–14 Sep 2012	86 — 90	26	
19	Mon – Fri; 20:00－20:30	17–21 Sep 2012	91 — 95	26	
20	Mon – Fri; 20:00－20:30	24–28 Sep 2012	96 — 100	24	
21	Mon – Fri; 20:00－20:30	2–5 Oct 2012	101 — 104	26	
22	Mon – Fri; 20:00－20:30	9–12 Oct 2012	105 — 108	26	
23	Mon – Fri; 20:00－20:30	15–19 Oct 2012	109 — 113	26	
24	Mon – Fri; 20:00－20:30	22–26 Oct 2012	114 — 118	25	
25	Mon – Fri; 20:00－20:30	29 Oct–2 Nov 2012	119 — 123	27	
26	Mon – Fri; 20:00－20:30	5–9 Nov 2012	124 — 128	25	
27	Mon – Fri; 20:00－20:30	12–16 Nov 2012	129 — 133	25	
28	Mon – Fri; 20:00－20:30	20–23 Nov 2012	134 — 137	25	
29	Mon – Fri; 20:00－20:30	27-30 Nov 2012	138 — 142	25	
30	Mon – Fri; 20:00－20:30	3-7 Dec 2012	143 — 147	25	
31	Mon – Fri; 20:00－20:30	10-14 Dec 2012	148 — 152	26	
32	Mon – Fri; 20:00－20:30	18-21 Dec 2012	153 — 156	24	
33	Mon – Fri; 20:00－20:30	24-28 Dec 2012	157 — 161	23	
34	Mon – Fri; 20:00－20:30	31 Dec 2012-4 Jan 2013	162 — 166	23	

2013 Episode Ratings (Episode 167 — 421) (Week 35 — 86)
#	Timeslot (HKT)	Week	Episode(s)	Average points	Peaking points
35	Mon – Fri; 20:00－20:30	7-11 Jan 2013	167 — 171	24	
36	Mon – Fri; 20:00－20:30	14-18 Jan 2013	172 — 176	24	
37	Mon – Fri; 20:00－20:30	21-25 Jan 2013	177 — 181	24	
38	Mon – Fri; 20:00－20:30	28 Jan-1 Feb 2013	182 — 186	24	
39	Mon – Fri; 20:00－20:30	4-8 Feb 2013	187 — 191	22	
40	Mon – Fri; 20:00－20:30	12-15 Feb 2013	192 — 195	22	
41	Mon – Fri; 20:00－20:30	18-24 Feb 2013	196 — 200	23	
42	Mon – Fri; 20:00－20:30	25 Feb-1 Mar 2013	201 — 205	23	
43	Mon – Fri; 20:00－20:30	4-8 Mar 2013	206 — 210	23	
44	Mon – Fri; 20:00－20:30	11-15 Mar 2013	211 — 215	24	
45	Mon – Fri; 20:00－20:30	18-22 Mar 2013	216 — 220	23	
46	Mon – Fri; 20:00－20:30	25-29 Mar 2013	221 — 225	23	
47	Mon – Fri; 20:00－20:30	1-5 Apr 2013	226 — 230	24	
48	Mon – Fri; 20:00－20:30	8-12 Apr 2013	231 — 235	26	
49	Mon – Fri; 20:00－20:30	15-19 Apr 2013	236 — 240	25	
50	Mon – Fri; 20:00－20:30	22-26 Apr 2013	241 — 245	24	
51	Mon – Fri; 20:00－20:30	29 Apr-3 May 2013	246 — 250	25	27
52	Mon – Fri; 20:00－20:30	6–10 May 2013	251 — 255	24	27
53	Mon – Fri; 20:00－20:30	13–17 May 2013	256 — 260	22	24
54	Mon – Fri; 20:00－20:30	20–24 May 2013	261 — 265	24	
55	Mon – Fri; 20:00－20:30	27–31 May 2013	266 — 270	23	25
56	Mon – Fri; 20:00－20:30	3-7 Jun 2013	271 — 275	23	
57	Mon – Fri; 20:00－20:30	10-14 Jun 2013	276 — 280	24	27
58	Mon – Fri; 20:00－20:30	17-21 Jun 2013	281 — 285	24	27
59	Mon – Fri; 20:00－20:30	24-28 Jun 2013	286 — 290	25	
60	Mon – Fri; 20:00－20:30	1-5 Jul 2013	291 — 295	24	
61	Mon – Fri; 20:00－20:30	8-12 Jul 2013	296 — 300	24	
62	Mon – Fri; 20:00－20:30	15-19 Jul 2013	301 — 305	24	
63	Mon – Fri; 20:00－20:30	22-26 Jul 2013	306 — 310	24	
64	Mon – Fri; 20:00－20:30	29 Jul-2 Aug 2013	311 — 315	23	
65	Mon – Fri; 20:00－20:30	5-9 Aug 2013	316 — 320	23	
66	Mon – Fri; 20:00－20:30	12-16 Aug 2013	321 — 325	25	
67	Mon – Fri; 20:00－20:30	19-23 Aug 2013	326 — 330	23	
68	Mon – Fri; 20:00－20:30	26-30 Aug 2013	331 — 335	24	
69	Mon – Fri; 20:00－20:30	2-6 Sep 2013	336 — 340	24	
70	Mon – Fri; 20:00－20:30	9-13 Sep 2013	341 — 345	22	
71	Mon – Fri; 20:00－20:30	16-20 Sep 2013	346 — 350	22	
72	Mon – Fri; 20:00－20:30	23-27 Sep 2013	351 — 355	24	
73	Mon – Fri; 20:00－20:30	30 Sep-3 Oct 2013	356 — 359	25	
74	Mon – Fri; 20:00－20:30	7-11 Oct 2013	360 — 364	23	
75	Mon – Fri; 20:00－20:30	14-18 Oct 2013	365 — 369	25	
76	Mon – Fri; 20:00－20:30	21-25 Oct 2013	370 — 374	24	
77	Mon – Fri; 20:00－20:30	28 Oct-1 Nov 2013	375 — 379	23	
78	Mon – Fri; 20:00－20:30	4-8 Nov 2013	380 — 384	23	
79	Mon – Fri; 20:00－20:30	11-15 Nov 2013	385 — 389	23	
80	Mon – Fri; 20:00－20:30	18-22 Nov 2013	390 — 393	23	
81	Mon – Fri; 20:00－20:30	25-29 Nov 2013	394 — 398	23	
82	Mon – Fri; 20:00－20:30	2-6 Dec 2013	399 — 403	24	
83	Mon – Fri; 20:00－20:30	9-13 Dec 2013	404 — 408	24	
84	Mon – Fri; 20:00－20:30	17-19 Dec 2013	409 — 411	23	25
85	Mon – Fri; 20:00－20:30	23-27 Dec 2013	412 — 416	22	
86	Mon – Fri; 20:00－20:30	30 Dec 2013-3 Jan 2014	417 — 421	24	

2014 Episode Ratings (Episode 422 — 676) (Week 87 — 138)
#	Timeslot (HKT)	Week	Episode(s)	Average points	Peaking points
87	Mon – Fri; 20:00－20:30	6-10 Jan 2014	422 — 426	24	
88	Mon – Fri; 20:00－20:30	13-16 Jan 2014	427 — 430	23	
89	Mon – Fri; 20:00－20:30	20-24 Jan 2014	431 — 435	24	
90	Mon – Fri; 20:00－20:30	27-30 Jan 2014	436 — 439	22	
91	Mon – Fri; 20:00－20:30	3-7 Feb 2014	440 — 444	24	
92	Mon – Fri; 20:00－20:30	10-14 Feb 2014	445 — 449	26	
93	Mon – Fri; 20:00－20:30	17-21 Feb 2014	450 — 454	24	
94	Mon – Fri; 20:00－20:30	24-28 Feb 2014	455 — 459	24	
95	Mon – Fri; 20:00－20:30	3-7 Mar 2014	460 — 464	25	
96	Mon – Fri; 20:00－20:30	10-14 Mar 2014	465 — 469	25	
97	Mon – Fri; 20:00－20:30	17-21 Mar 2014	470 — 474	25	
98	Mon – Fri; 20:00－20:30	24-28 Mar 2014	475 — 479	25	
99	Mon – Fri; 20:00－20:30	31 Mar-4 Apr 2014	480 — 484	24	
100	Mon – Fri; 20:00－20:30	7-11 Apr 2014	485 — 489	23	
101	Mon – Fri; 20:00－20:30	14-18 Apr 2014	490 — 494	23	
102	Mon – Fri; 20:00－20:30	21-25 Apr 2014	495 — 499	24	
103	Mon – Fri; 20:00－20:30	28 Apr-2 May 2014	500 — 504	23	
104	Mon – Fri; 20:00－20:30	5–9 May 2014	505 — 509	23	
105	Mon – Fri; 20:00－20:30	12–16 May 2014	510 — 514	23	
106	Mon – Fri; 20:00－20:30	19–23 May 2014	515 — 519	22	
107	Mon – Fri; 20:00－20:30	26–30 May 2014	520 — 524	21	
108	Mon – Fri; 20:00－20:30	2-6 Jun 2014	525 — 529	22	
109	Mon – Fri; 20:00－20:30	9-13 Jun 2014	530 — 534	22	
110	Mon – Fri; 20:00－20:30	16-20 Jun 2014	535 — 539	22	
111	Mon – Fri; 20:00－20:30	23-27 Jun 2014	540 — 544	22	
112	Mon – Fri; 20:00－20:30	30 Jun-4 Jul 2014	545 — 549	21	
113	Mon – Fri; 20:00－20:30	7-11 Jul 2014	550 — 554	22	
114	Mon – Fri; 20:00－20:30	14-18 Jul 2014	555 — 559	23	
115	Mon – Fri; 20:00－20:30	21-25 Jul 2014	560 — 564	24	
116	Mon – Fri; 20:00－20:30	28 Jul-1 Aug 2014	565 — 569	23	
117	Mon – Fri; 20:00－20:30	4-8 Aug 2014	570 — 574	22	
118	Mon – Fri; 20:00－20:30	11-15 Aug 2014	575 — 579	23	
119	Mon – Fri; 20:00－20:30	18-22 Aug 2014	580 — 584	24	
120	Mon – Fri; 20:00－20:30	25-29 Aug 2014	585 — 589	22	
121	Mon – Fri; 20:00－20:30	1-5 Sep 2014	590 — 594	23	
122	Mon – Fri; 20:00－20:30	8-12 Sep 2014	595 — 599	24	
123	Mon – Fri; 20:00－20:30	15-19 Sep 2014	600 — 604	24	
124	Mon – Fri; 20:00－20:30	22-26 Sep 2014	605 — 609	23	
125	Mon – Fri; 20:00－20:30	29 Sep-3 Oct 2014	610 — 614	22	
126	Mon – Fri; 20:00－20:30	6-10 Oct 2014	615 — 619	22	
127	Mon – Fri; 20:00－20:30	13-17 Oct 2014	620 — 624	22	
128	Mon – Fri; 20:00－20:30	21-24 Oct 2014	625 — 628	22	
129	Mon – Fri; 20:00－20:30	27-31 Oct 2014	629 — 633	21	
130	Mon – Fri; 20:00－20:30	3-7 Nov 2014	634 — 638	21	
131	Mon – Fri; 20:00－20:30	10-14 Nov 2014	639 — 643	22	
132	Mon – Fri; 20:00－20:30	17-21 Nov 2014	644 — 647	22	
133	Mon – Fri; 20:00－20:30	24-28 Nov 2014	648 — 652	22	
134	Mon – Fri; 20:00－20:30	1-5 Dec 2014	653 — 657	23	
135	Mon – Fri; 20:00－20:30	8-12 Dec 2014	658 — 662	24	
136	Mon – Fri; 20:00－20:30	16-19 Dec 2014	663 — 666	22	
137	Mon – Fri; 20:00－20:30	22-26 Dec 2014	667 — 671	22	
138	Mon – Fri; 20:00－20:30	29 Dec 2014-2 Jan 2015	672 — 676	22	

2015 Episode Ratings (Episode 677 — 804) (Week 139 — 164)
#	Timeslot (HKT)	Week	Episode(s)	Average points	Peaking points
139	Mon – Fri; 20:00－20:30	5-9 Jan 2015	677 — 681	23	
140	Mon – Fri; 20:00－20:30	12-16 Jan 2015	682 — 686	22	
141	Mon – Fri; 20:00－20:30	19-23 Jan 2015	687 — 691	23	
142	Mon – Fri; 20:00－20:30	26-30 Jan 2015	692 — 696	22	
143	Mon – Fri; 20:00－20:30	2-6 Feb 2015	697 — 701	22	
144	Mon – Fri; 20:00－20:30	9-13 Feb 2015	702 — 706	22	
145	Mon – Fri; 20:00－20:30	16-18 Feb 2015	707 — 709	21	23
146	Mon – Fri; 20:00－20:30	23-27 Feb 2015	710 — 714	23	
147	Mon – Fri; 20:00－20:30	2-6 Mar 2015	715 — 719	23	
148	Mon – Fri; 20:00－20:30	9-13 Mar 2015	720 — 724	23	
149	Mon – Fri; 20:00－20:30	16-20 Mar 2015	725 — 729	22	
150	Mon – Fri; 20:00－20:30	23-27 Mar 2015	730 — 734	22	
151	Mon – Fri; 20:00－20:30	30 Mar-3 Apr 2015	735 — 739	22	
152	Mon – Fri; 20:00－20:30	6-10 Apr 2015	740 — 744	23	
153	Mon – Fri; 20:00－20:30	13-17 Apr 2015	745 — 749	23	
154	Mon – Fri; 20:00－20:30	20-24 Apr 2015	750 — 754	22	
155	Mon – Fri; 20:00－20:30	27 Apr-1 May 2015	755 — 759	22	
156	Mon – Fri; 20:00－20:30	4–8 May 2015	760 — 764	22	
157	Mon – Fri; 20:00－20:30	11–15 May 2015	765 — 769	22	
158	Mon – Fri; 20:00－20:30	18–22 May 2015	770 — 774	23	
159	Mon – Fri; 20:00－20:30	25–29 May 2015	775 — 779	22	25
160	Mon – Fri; 20:00－20:30	1-5 Jun 2015	780 — 784	23	26
161	Mon – Fri; 20:00－20:30	8-12 Jun 2015	785 — 789	23	
162	Mon – Fri; 20:00－20:30	15-19 Jun 2015	790 — 794	22	
163	Mon – Fri; 20:00－20:30	22-26 Jun 2015	795 — 799	24	
164	Mon – Fri; 20:00－20:30	29 Jun-3 Jul 2015	800 — 804	24	27

^Note 1: Episode 51 (July 23, 2012) peaked at 38 points as a result of Typhoon Vicente.

*' Episodes were not broadcast on:
*2012 - October 1, October 8, November 19, December 17
*2013 - February 11, October 4, November 19, December 16, December 20
*2014 - January 17, January 31, October 20, November 19, December 15
*2015 - February 19, February 20

== International broadcast ==
Network	Country	Airing Date	Timeslot
Astro Wah Lai Toi; Astro Wah Lai Toi HD (Formerly Astro Zhi Zun HD)	Malaysia	December 25, 2012－July 10, 2014	Monday-Friday 9:00－9:30 pm
Astro Wah Lai Toi; Astro Wah Lai Toi HD (Formerly Astro Zhi Zun HD)	Malaysia	July 11, 2014－February 11, 2016	Monday-Friday 8:00－8:30 pm
HTV7	Vietnam	March 11, 2013－May 7, 2013	Monday-Saturday 12:00－1:00 pm
StarHub TV	Singapore	April 25, 2013－May 25, 2016	Monday-Friday 8:00－8:30 pm
Fairchild TV	Canada	May 26, 2013－Present	Saturday 6:00-7:30 am,11:00 am–12:30 pm, 7:00-8:30 pm, 10:30-11:00 pm (Eastern Time Zone); Sunday 6:00-7:00 am, 11:00 am–12:00 pm, 7:00-8:00 pm, 10:30-11:30 pm (Pacific Time Zone)

== See also ==
- Come Home Love 2
