= From Shenzhen to Zhongshan =

2024 Hong Kong television series

- Also known as: 玩轉深中懶人包
- Genre: Food reality television
- Written by: Paul Tsui Ka-cheung; Yuen Sze-yung
- Presented by: Nancy Sit; Alice Chan; Matthew Ho; Hera Chan; Tiffany Fabienne; Bob Cheung; Roxanne Ho; Niklas Lam
- Country of origin: Hong Kong
- Original language: Cantonese
- No. of seasons: 1
- No. of episodes: 8

Production
- Producer: Cheung Hok-yi
- Running time: 25 minutes
- Production company: TVB

Original release
- Network: TVB Jade myTV Super
- Release: 13 June – 5 July 2024

From Shenzhen to Zhongshan (Chinese: 玩轉深中懶人包) is a Hong Kong food and travel reality television series that aired weekly on TVB Jade from 13 June to 5 July 2024. The series comprises eight episodes.

The program follows lead hosts Nancy Sit and Alice Chan, alongside Matthew Ho, Hera Chan, Tiffany Fabienne, Bob Cheung, Roxanne Ho, and Niklas Lam, as they travel along the Shenzhen–Zhongshan Link to explore local food and culture. Featured destinations include Zhongshan, Maoming, Yangjiang, and Jiangmen.

== Episodes ==
| No. | Title | Original release date |
|---|---|---|
| 1 | "Episode 1" | 13 June 2024 |
The episode follows the hosts as they explore Zhongshan's local cuisine, including pigeon and banana blossom dishes, visit a crisp grass carp farm to learn about its cultivation and sample a multi-course fish feast, and conclude their journey at a hot spring resort.
| 2 | "Episode 2" | 14 June 2024 |
The hosts explore breakfast options including Sanxiang noodle soup and pork wonton soup. Later, while sampling a variety of chrysanthemum-themed dishes, Alice Chan personally prepares chrysanthemum pancakes. They sample additional delicacies before visiting a coffee shop converted from an old watchtower.
| 3 | "Episode 3" | 20 June 2024 |
Alice Chan and Hera Chan learn to make leaf-wrapped rice dumplings, while the hosts later explore nostalgic local dishes, heritage-themed café culture, and contemporary interpretations of regional cuisine.
| 4 | "Episode 4" | 21 June 2024 |
The hosts travels to Maoming to explore its lychee industry, including a historic orchard and a lychee exhibition, while sampling lychee-based desserts. The itinerary also includes visits to a hot spring resort and a mountainous retreat, highlighting local culture and natural scenery.
| 5 | "Episode 5" | 27 June 2024 |
Nancy Sit assumes the role of lead host as the group visits a wet market, samples a traditional Maoming seafood meal, and tours the Maoming Open-Pit Mine Ecological Park, followed by a visit to a night market. In subsequent segments set in Yangjiang, Tsui Wing and Nicholas Yuen appear as guest participants accompanying the hosts.
| 6 | "Episode 6" | 28 June 2024 |
The group samples Chinese medicinal-infused dishes and seafood and explores local food culture by visiting a fermented black bean factory. They also visit Hailing Island for leisure activities, including sunbathing and a seaside barbecue.
| 7 | "Episode 7" | 4 July 2024 |
The group travels to Jiangmen, where they visit a chenpi (dried tangerine peel) farm and shop and sample chenpi-infused local dishes, along with other regional specialties such as Taishan-style eel rice and crispy char siu.
| 8 | "Episode 8" | 5 July 2024 |
The group continues their visit in Jiangmen, sampling local cuisine and visiting cultural sites, including a cha chaan teng operated by actor Jerry Ku, who prepares signature milk tea. They also tour Chikan Ancient Town and craftmanship shops.

== Ratings ==
| Week | Episodes | Airing dates | Ratings (Note: According to Hong Kong's TV rating system, each rating point represents approximately 64,670 viewers.) | | Ref. |
| Week | Episodes | Airing dates | Cross-platform peak ratings | Viewership | Ref. |
|---|---|---|---|---|---|
| 1 | 1 – 2 | 13–14 June 2024 | 10.1 points | 650,000 | |
| 2 | 3 – 4 | 20 –21 June 2024 | 10.2 points | 660,000 | |
| 3 | 5 – 6 | 27–28 June 2024 | 10.7 points | 690,000 | |
| 4 | 7 – 8 | 4–5 July 2024 | 11.6 points | 760,000 | |
