= Shuang Xing =

Malaysian television channel

Astro Shuang Xing
- Country: Malaysia
- Broadcast area: Malaysia; Asia (via satellites)

Programming
- Language: Mandarin
- Picture format: 1080i (HDTV)

Ownership
- Owner: Astro (Astro Malaysia Holdings Berhad)

History
- Launched: 1 January 2003; 23 years ago (SD); 16 November 2014; 11 years ago (HD)
- Closed: 15 March 2021; 5 years ago (Astro & NJOI) (SD); 1 July 2021; 5 years ago (Kristal-Astro) (HD); 28 August 2023; 2 years ago (Astro & NJOI) (HD)
- Replaced by: Astro QJ HD; Astro AEC
- Former names: Shuang Xing (1 January 2003 - 28 September 2003)

Links
- Website: xuan.com.my/channels/shx

Astro Shuang Xing (simplified Chinese: Astro双星; traditional Chinese: Astro雙星) was an 24-hour Mandarin youth entertainment TV channel owned and run by pay TV provider, Astro. The channel provided variety entertainment that target for younger generation.

== History and programming ==
Astro Shuang Xing officially launched on 1 January 2003 during the Chinese New Year on Dynasty package then Empreror package. Its programming genres covered from epic to idol, action, costume, comedy and romance. Its unique scheduling pattern enabled viewers to catch up on the last episode first before the new episode was broadcast.

Astro Shuang Xing HD was launched on 16 November 2014 and was the simulcast HD version of it on Channel 307. Malay and Chinese subtitles are available for all dramas (excluding Singaporean dramas which does not have Chinese subtitles). However, English subtitles is only available for Cantonese (between 19 November 2014 to 23 September 2015) and Japanese dramas.

Since 9 July 2018, the channel started showing more dramas from China while Singaporean dramas moved to its sister channel, Astro AEC, Meanwhile, Astro Shuang Xing was broadcasting rerun dramas and new released dramas from China and Taiwan.

After 20 yaars, Astro Shuang Xing ceased transmission on 28 August 2023, and the remaining programs moved to Astro QJ HD and Astro AEC.

=== Astro channel moves ===
- On 1 February 2003, Astro Shuang Xing launched, broadcasting two channels, i.e., Shuang Xing 1 (channel 37) and Shuang Xing 2 (channel 38), respectively.
- On 1 May 2004, the first channel was discontinued and the second channel was retained, merging the two channels to a single channel.
- On 1 October 2007, as part of the channel renumbering, Astro Shuang Xing moved to channel 324.
- On 16 November 2014, Astro Shuang Xing HD was launched on channel 307.
- On 1 April 2020, as part of the channel renumbering, the SD version moved to channel 347.
- On 15 March 2021, the SD version ceased broadcasting on channel 347.
- On 28 August 2023, the HD version ceased broadcasting on channel 307.
