= Miss Asia Pageant =

Beauty contest

- Formation: 1985; 41 years ago
- Type: Beauty pageant
- Location: Hong Kong
- Official language: Chinese, English
- Parent organization: Asia Television
- Website: www.missasia.com.hk

Miss Asia Pageant
- Traditional Chinese: 亞洲小姐競選
- Simplified Chinese: 亚洲小姐竞选
Transcriptions
Standard Mandarin
- Hanyu Pinyin: Yàzhōu Xiǎojie Jìngxuǎn
Yue: Cantonese
- Jyutping: aa^{3} zau^{1} siu^{2} ze^{2} ging^{3} syun^{2}

ATV Miss Asia Pageant (Chinese: ATV 亞洲小姐競選) is an annual Hong Kong–based beauty pageant organized and broadcast by Asia Television (ATV). Originating in 1985 as a local Hong Kong pageant, the contest went on a hiatus from 2000 through 2003, and was re-branded as an Asian pageant in 2004, with contestants spanning the continent of Asia. The pageant was ceased to exist in 2015 with the shutdown of its organizer, ATV.

In 2018, ATV announced that they are rebooting the pageant, after their transition from a terrestrial broadcast operation to an online media company. The pageant, which will be partnered with South Korean company CJ E&M, was reported by the media as "ATV's biggest investment of the year".

== History ==
=== 1985–2000: Beginnings as local pageant ===
With the success of the Miss Hong Kong Pageant by rival Hong Kong television station Television Broadcasts Limited (TVB), ATV started organizing Miss Asia Pageant in 1985, searching out Hong Kong's representative for Miss Asia Pacific International (then known as the Miss Asia Pacific Quest). The pageant name was a bit of a misnomer back then as Miss Asia Pageant was actually named to match the name of organizer Asia Television Limited, and it was solely intended for local Hong Kong residents to enter.

In 1995, the pageant made history by removing age restrictions for delegates. That year, Aicardi Jiang (宮雪花), at the age of 47 years became the oldest delegate of Miss Asia, placing fifth in the pageant. On the other end of the spectrum, On-Yuen To (陶安仁), was the youngest delegate at the age of 15 years.

In 2000, due to poor ratings and lack of sponsors, ATV announced that the pageant would go on hiatus until further notice.

=== 2000–present: Post-hiatus and rebrands ===
In 2004, ATV rebooted the pageant and re-branded it as an event for not just Hong Kong, but also for the rest of Asia as contestants from other parts of Asia now participate, finally living up to its namesake as an Asia-wide pageant. However, the pageant is still very Chinese focused, with multiple representatives from Hong Kong, Taiwan and Mainland China, compared to one contestant from each of the rest of the countries.

As of 2011, Miss Asia Chinese Regional Competitions selects Chinese delegates in several regions: Hong Kong, Macau, mainland China, Taiwan, Canada, and US. Then, the top performers of these competitions come together for the ATV Miss Asia Pageant Greater China Finals, which also acts as the semi-finals of the ATV Miss Asia Pageant, selecting around 10 finalists (12 finalists are selected in 2013). These delegates are then joined by national pageant winners from other Asian countries to compete the crown of ATV Miss Asia at the Finals.

In 2011, the pageant name has been modified to ATV Miss Asia Pageant (ATV亞洲小姐競選), adding the organizer's name to the title, to distinguish it from other Asia-wide beauty pageants.

Whereas the pageant mirrored Miss Hong Kong Pageant pre-hiatus, the revived version more closely resembled the Miss Chinese International Pageant, which is also organized by rival television station, TVB.

In 2018, ATV rebooted the whole project after the company was transformed into an online media company.

Year	Winner	1st Runner-up	2nd Runner-up	Miss Photogenic
2006	Judy Tsang 曾敏			
2007	Jessica Wong 黃礎瑩	王爽	陳詠虹	
2008	Belinda Yan 顏子菲	Julie Fan 譚麗思	Doris Tam 范冰一	
2009	An Sheng 盛安	Marilyn Lin 林雅麗	Carol Zuo 左亮	An Sheng 盛安
2010	Lucy Qi 祁翼	Cleone Ye 葉小寒	吳皓	
2011	Jolene Berude 裘琳	Janet Lam 林珍娜	Josi Gao	林珍娜
2012	Mary Tan 陳瑪莉	Jess McKenzie 謝莤嘉·麥堅斯	Joanna Yu	
2013	Diana Duong 董安娜	Angela Liang 梁詩韻	Kushi Gupta	
2014	Sunpreet Dhaliwal 辛珮·達利禾	May Tong 唐淑薇	Rowena Zhang	
2015	Tracy Le-Nguye	Sudupta Das	Lisa Nguyen	
2016	Jae Hee Mun	Fei Fei Li	Diana Rao	
2017	Leona Liu	Megan Soo	Jennele Giong	
2018	Julia Yang 楊鈺	Lily Park	Angelina Liang	
2019	Ava Khajeh	Genevieve Zhou	(Disqualify) Shayna Ding 丁雪怡	
2020	Jimin Yoo	Tiffany Lam	Sarah Wang	
2021	Cierra Johnson	Kayla Ko	Patty Chomseng	
2022	Anna-Marie Ondaatje	Wing Hu 胡永諭	Marion Jubelle	Anna-Marie Ondaatje

== See also ==
- Miss Hong Kong Pageant
- Miss Chinese International Pageant
- Miss Asia Pacific International
