= Come Home Love series 2 =

Come Home Love
- Series 2
- Come Home Love series 2 official poster
- Starring: Louis Cheung; Priscilla Wong; Katy Kung; Owen Cheung; Quinn Ho; James Ng; Evergreen Mak; Helen Ma; Li Fung
- No. of episodes: 805–995 (continued from Sr.1)

Release
- Original network: TVB Jade, HD Jade
- Original release: 6 July 2015 – 1 April 2016

Series chronology
- ← Previous; Come Home Love 2 (Ep. 1–804)

Come Home Love series 2
- Chinese: 愛·回家
- Cantonese Yale: Oi·Wùih Gā
- Literal meaning: "Love, Return Home"
Transcriptions
Standard Mandarin
- Hanyu Pinyin: Ài·Huí Jiā
- Bopomofo: ㄞˋ ㄏㄨㄟˊㄐㄧㄚ
Yue: Cantonese
- Yale Romanization: Oi·Wùih Gā
- Jyutping: Oi3·Wui4 Gaa1
- IPA: [ɔ̄ːy wṷːy.káː]

Come Home Love (Chinese: 愛·回家; literally "Love, Return Home") is a Hong Kong sitcom that is a continuation of TVB's long running sitcom Come Home Love with a whole new cast and production team. The second series plot and characters did not have any connections to the first series. Lai Lok-yi, Geoffrey Wong, Max Cheung and Griselda Yeung, resumes their characters from the first series and play minor roles. The main cast are Katy Kung, Owen Cheung, Quinn Ho, James Ng, Evergreen Mak, Helen Ma and Li Fung. Louis Cheung and Priscilla Wong also made their appearance for the first 2 months as the main cast from July 6, 2015, the release date for the first episode of the second series. The new cast started appearing on episode 805 and slowly transitioning out the cast from the first series. However, most of the actors from the Ma family in the first series appeared again in the second series on 23 December 2015 due to low ratings of the second series. The series is broadcast on Hong Kong's TVB Jade and HD Jade channels every Monday through Friday during its 8:00 pm to 8:30 pm timeslot.

== Synopsis ==
The series centers around the family, employees and relationships of three shops in Hong Kong.

Leo (Louis Cheung) is the owner and popular fitness instructor of "See See Fitness", his long-time girlfriend Wan Si Si (Priscilla Wong) manages all the staff, clerical, legal and accounting work for his business which puts him at ease to concentrate on his clients. Though Leo feels their relationship is steady, Si Si often feels insecure and neglected by Leo since they have been together for so long and she has no legal status. While witnessing an employee going through a nasty divorce, Si Si fears that Leo will leave her one-day and secretly has her lawyer draw up documents so she can have half of Leo's business without him knowing. After being reminded by a friend, Leo realizes all the support Si Si has given him without him knowing and shows his appreciation. Feeling at ease, Si Si shreds her lawyer's documents.

Anson (Owen Cheung) has just returned to Hong Kong after studying yoga in India. He wants to work as a yoga instructor at "See See Fitness", but his family eagerly wants him to take over their dry seafood business. His first day at the family shop, he uses his allergic reaction to the shop's pet cat as an excuse on why he can't be at the shop. His father Lun Bak Fuen (Evergreen Mak), knowing Anson set up the cat to go near him gives him a year and half to pursue his interest, but makes Anson promise that after the year and half have past he must take over the family business since the shop's cat will past its life expectancy by then and there won't be any excuses why Anson can't be at the shop. Bak Fuen knows his son has no interest in the family business and he doesn't want to push him into it but he feels obligated to hand the business over to him since the business was inherited from his late father-in-law (Anson's maternal grandfather).

== Cast ==
=== Main cast ===
- Louis Cheung as "Leo" Seung Kin San (常健新)

Wan Sze Sze's longtime boyfriend. Owner and instructor of "See See Fitness". He and Sze Sze later breakup on episode 846 and went to Maldives.

- Priscilla Wong as Wan Sze Sze (溫詩詩)

Leo's longtime girlfriend. She manages "See See Fitness". She and Leo later breakup on episode 846 and went to Maldives.

- Owen Cheung as "Anson" Lun Lap Shun (倫立信)

Lun Bak Fuen's son. Heir to On Fai Dry Goods business. Yoga instructor at "See See Fitness". Has no interest in the family business.

- Quinn Ho as "Billy" Fong Ka Sheung (方嘉尚)

Wan Sze Sze's younger cousin. He returned to Hong Kong from Singapore and request to join "See See Fitness" as the marketing manager.

- Katy Kung as Lee Lok Yi (利樂兒)

Lok Tung's older twin sister, hardworking and capable. She has a number of suitors, but dislikes how all of them try to win her over with gifts instead of trying to get to know her.

- James Ng as "Kenny" Lei Lok Tung (利樂童)

Lok Yee's younger twin brother, lazy and weak-willed. He tries to take advantage of Anson and Billy's competition for Lok Yi for material benefits.

- Evergreen Mak as Lun Bak Fuen (倫伯寬)

Anson's widowed father and Lun Ching Man's younger brother. Current boss of On Fai Dry Goods. Wants his son to work in the family business.

- Li Fung as Lun Ching Man (倫靜雯)

Lun Bak Fuen's older sister and Anson's aunt. She manages the accounting at On Fai Dry Goods.

- Helen Ma as Man Wai Lan (文惠蘭)

The Lun family longtime employee. She works as a maid at the Lun home and by day help manage On Fai Dry Goods.

=== See See Fitness staff ===
- Virginia Lau as "Amy" Lam Hei Nga (林希雅)
- Christy Chan as Chow Wing Han (周穎嫻)
- Mikako Leung as "Feya" Song Chi Yue (宋梓茹)
- Rocky Cheng as "Raymond" Ma Wat Fan (馬屈帆)
- Otto Chan as Wong Bok Si (王博仕)
- Nathan Ngai as "Henry" Lo Chung Tak (魯仲德)
- Kiko Leung as "Kay" Lee Kei (李淇)
- Tse Ho Yat as Luk Liu (陸磊)

=== On Fai Dry Goods staff ===
- Kong Wing Fai as Lam Chung Yau (林忠有)
- Kelvin Lee as Sing Son Hang (成申行)
- Cheng Shu Fung as Law Hon Ko (羅漢果)
- Lily Liew as Fung Ying Oi (馮英愛)

=== Im family ===
- Max Cheung as "Richard" Im Gan (嚴謹)
- Griselda Yeung as Fung Yin Ha (馮嫣霞)

=== Cha Bak Im Law Offices ===
- Lai Lok-yi as "John" Ma Chaung (馬壯)
- Geoffrey Wong as "Damon" Cha Ka Sak (查嘉澤)

=== Extended cast ===
- Maggie Yu as 小花 or 邪花 (宋小花), expert cook and seamstress. Also a Tai Chi expert. Becomes Lun Bak Fuen's housemaid.
- Vincent Lam
- Gill Mohindepaul Singh
- Gloria Chan
- Bobo Yeung
- Wong Wai Tong
- Lena Wong
- Ice Chow
- Kanice Lau
- KK Cheung as "Johnson" Lei Kwok Wing (利國榮), Lok Tung and Lok Yee's father. He first appeared on episode 925.

== Development ==
- In February 2015, TVB announced that the highly popular Come Home Love would be coming to an end after being on air since 2012.
- While planning the end of Come Home Love first series, TVB originally planned to have Louis Cheung, Eliza Sam, and a cast of fresh talents star in the upcoming sitcom. However plans were scrapped by TVB as they were afraid audiences might not react well to unknown new talents.
- In May 2015, instead of ending the series TVB decided to spin off the series focusing on a new cast instead. Louis Cheung and Priscilla Wong were confirmed to lead the new series at a press conference.
- Filming of series 2 began in May 2015.
- The costume fitting ceremony was held on May 27, 2015 at 12:30 pm Tseung Kwan O TVB City Studio One.

== Viewership Ratings ==
*Episode number is continued from series 1

2015
#	Timeslot (HKT)	Week	Episode(s)	Average points	Peaking points
1	Mon – Fri; 20:00－20:30	06–10 July 2015	805–809	25	31
2	Mon – Fri; 20:00－20:30	13–17 July 2015	810–814	21	–
3	Mon – Fri; 20:00－20:30	20–24 July 2015	815–819	23	–
4	Mon – Fri; 20:00－20:30	27–31 July 2015	820–824	22	–
5	Mon – Fri; 20:00－20:30	03–07 Aug 2015	825–829	21	–
6	Mon – Fri; 20:00－20:30	10–14 Aug 2015	830–834	22	–
7	Mon – Fri; 20:00－20:30	17–21 Aug 2015	835–839	21	–
8	Mon – Fri; 20:00－20:30	24–28 Aug 2015	840–844	21	–
9	Mon – Fri; 20:00－20:30	31 Aug–04 Sep 2015	845–849	21	–
10	Mon – Fri; 20:00－20:30	07–11 Sep 2015	850–854	20	–
11	Mon – Fri; 20:00－20:30	14–18 Sep 2015	855–859	20	
12	Mon – Fri; 20:00－20:30	21–25 Sep 2015	860–864	20	
13	Mon – Fri; 20:00－20:30	28 Sep–02 Oct 2015	865–869	21	
14	Mon – Fri; 20:00－20:30	05–09 Oct 2015	870–874	22	
15	Mon – Fri; 20:00－20:30	12–16 Oct 2015	875–879	21	
16	Mon – Fri; 20:00－20:30	19–23 Oct 2015	880–884	22	
17	Mon – Fri; 20:00－20:30	26–30 Oct 2015	885–889	21	
18	Mon – Fri; 20:00－20:30	02–06 Nov 2015	890–894	22	
19	Mon – Fri; 20:00－20:30	09–13 Nov 2015	895–899	22	
20	Mon – Fri; 20:00－20:30	16–20 Nov 2015	900–905	21	
Total average					

== See also ==
- Come Home Love
