= Astro AEC =

Malaysian television channel

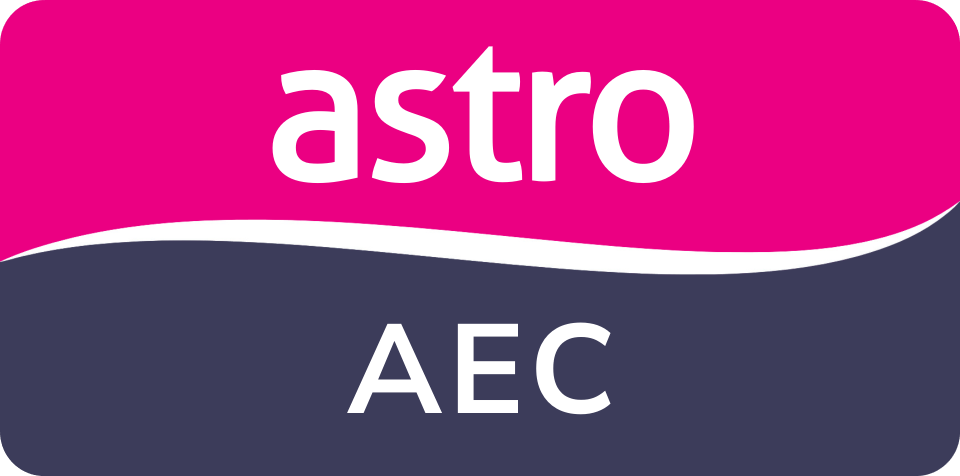
- Country: Malaysia
- Broadcast area: Malaysia
- Headquarters: Bukit Jalil, Kuala Lumpur, Malaysia

Programming
- Language: Mandarin
- Picture format: 16:9 HDTV (1080i)

Ownership
- Owner: Astro (Astro Malaysia Holdings Berhad)
- Sister channels: Astro AOD; Astro Hua Hee Dai; Astro QJ

History
- Launched: 1 September 1997; 28 years ago
- Replaced: STAR Chinese Movies; Astro Xiao Tai Yang
- Former names: AEC (1997–2003)

Astro AEC (abbreviation for Asian Entertainment Channel) is a 24-hour in house Mandarin-generic television channel in Malaysia, owned by Astro. The channel broadcasts local productions in addition to productions from Singapore, Taiwan and Mainland China.

Astro AEC HD was launched on 16 November 2014 for Astro subscribers who subscribed to HD service. Subtitles are provided in Bahasa Malaysia, English and Chinese where available. The HD version became the only version of the channel on 15 March 2021.

== Logo history ==
Astro AEC HD logo (November 16, 2014 - November 14, 2024)

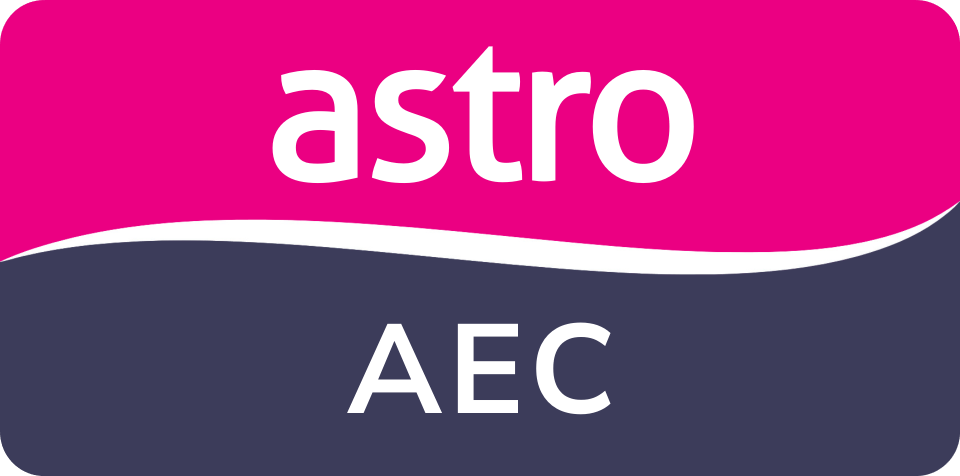
Astro AEC logo used since November 15, 2024
