= Television in Malaysia =

Malaysian television broadcasting was introduced on 28 December 1963. Colour television was introduced on 28 December 1978. Full-time colour transmissions were officially inaugurated on New Year's Day 1982. There are currently 14 national free-to-air terrestrial television channels in Malaysia and 3 national pay subscription television operators in Malaysia.

== History ==
Plans for a television network began to be outlined in February 1960, two and a half years after Malaysia achieved its independence, on 8 January 1962, it was decided that a 1963 launch target was set. Canadian technicians arrived to Malaysia in early 1963, to assist in its setup. Broadcasts started on 28 December 1963, opened by prime minister Tunku Abdul Rahman. Initially, the station in Kuala Lumpur broadcast on channel 10, but moved to channel 5 on 16 May 1964. The first expansion was in Ipoh and Malacca in April 1964 and then Penang and Johor by July. The pilot service became regular on 6 July.

Malaysia had a two-channel plan outlined, similar to Singapore (Singapore started television on 15 February 1963, before its brief integration into Malaysia, yet its television service was independent from the service from Kuala Lumpur). Arrival of new equipment from the United Kingdom implied the creation of the second network, which was initially due July 1964. In July 1968, the plan was formalised with an 8 February 1969 launch target. Before the launch, the existing TV Malaysia channel started broadcasting on spare frequencies in its coverage area in order to clear out the existing frequencies for a six-day Quranic reading competition between 14 and 19 December. The 8 February target was failed, being delayed to 17 November. Tunku Abdul Rahman opened the second channel, coinciding with the opening of Television House, and started at 9pm. Most of the first night on air consisted solely of the variety special Anekarama Angkasapuri.

On 31 August 1975, television broadcasts in Sarawak began.

Colour television began on RTM1 on 28 December 1978, the fifteenth anniversary of the launch of television, and on RTM2 on 7 May 1979.

== Broadcasting ==
Transmissions in Malaysia were black-and-white until 28 December 1978, when colour transmissions were introduced. First stereo audio broadcasting was introduced in 1985 by TV3. Five out of eight channels do not have 24-hour schedule. 24-hour television was introduced in Malaysia between 13 and 16 May 1989 on TV1. The first 24-hour broadcasting in Malaysia was introduced in 1997 by TV3, but was discontinued later due to energy-saving plan (see below). Since April 2006, TV2 broadcast round-the-clock followed by TV1, which began broadcasting 24 hours in August 2012 after having short-lived round-the-clock broadcast previously.

== Television providers ==
Subscription providers are available, with differences in the number of channels, capabilities such as the programme guide (EPG), video on demand (VOD), high-definition (HD), interactive television via the red button, and coverage across Malaysia. Set-top boxes are generally used to receive these services. Households viewing TV from the internet also tracked by the Malaysian government.

Provider	Free or pay	No. broadcast channels	VOD	HD	Red button	Transmission	Streaming Apps	Owner
MYTV	Free-to-air	25 (TV and Radio)	Yes	Yes	Yes	Digital terrestrial television and Digital satellite	MYTV Mana Mana	MYTV Broadcasting Sdn Bhd
Astro	Free and Pay TV (Bill)	175 (TV and Radio)	Yes	Yes	Yes	Digital satellite and IPTV (Both Multicast and Unicast)	Astro GO	Measat Broadcast Network Systems Sdn Bhd (Astro)
NJOI	Free and Pay TV (Prepaid)	172 (TV and Radio)	No	Yes	Yes	Digital satellite	NJOI Now (Discontinued)	Measat Broadcast Network Systems Sdn Bhd (Astro)
Unifi TV	Free and Pay TV	77 (TV and Radio)	Yes	Yes	Yes	IPTV	Unifi TV (app)	Telekom Malaysia Berhad (TM)

== Analogue terrestrial television ==
This was the traditional way of receiving television in Malaysia, however it is being supplanted by digital providers. There are eight channels; three of them are government public-owned by Radio Televisyen Malaysia (RTM). The three television channels are terrestrial free-to-air TV1, TV2 and Okey (formerly TVi). TV Alhijrah is owned by Alhijrah Media Corporation while TV3, NTV7, 8TV and TV9 are private and commercially owned by Media Prima. Worldview Broadcasting Channel was commercial-owned by Worldview Broadcasting Channel (M) Sdn Bhd. It has since closed down in October 2012 after they were unable to operate the channel due to financial difficulties. Analogue terrestrial transmissions were scheduled to be switched off in phases as part of the digital switchover, expected to be completed in 2020 as a recommendation from Southeast Asia. On 31 December 2018, digital television consortium MYTV Broadcasting scheduled the switchoff on third quarter 2019, to allow a period of digital set-top box distribution to eligible viewers with low income. The frequency has been moved to avoid signal jamming with television in Thailand and preventing Singaporeans from watching foreign-copyrighted programming, especially that contains Chinese dialects (mainly in Cantonese and Hokkien) on free-to-air, due to tight censorship currently in place in Singapore. The analogue were indefinitely switched off nationwide on 31 October 2019.

== Digital terrestrial television ==
In 2005, the Ministry of Information announced their plan to digitalise nationwide free-to-air TV broadcasts led by Radio Televisyen Malaysia (RTM). Trial broadcasts were undertaken, involving one thousand households in the Klang Valley from September 2006 till February 2007. According to the then-Deputy Minister of Information, Chia Kwang Chye, the trial received "very positive" feedback, i.e. "more than 60 percent said the quality of the signal ranged from good to very good. Over 88 percent said the picture quality improved, while 70 percent said the sound quality was better".

On 1 January 2008, TV3 announced that they were carrying out their own tests using a completely different system, T-DMB. However their test transmission is available only to areas surrounding their main headquarters at Sri Pentas, Bandar Utama, Petaling Jaya. The test signals consists of a single DAB stream, Fly FM, and two T-DMB streams, TV3 and a Hot Visual, which carries a slide show with audio signal streamed from the radio station Hot FM.

Despite a success of RTM's pilot trials, the digital terrestrial television transition faced many problems. These problems stemmed from the lesser enthusiasm of content providers toward the digitisation, with the exception of Les' Copaque Production, and the need to improve the nation's Internet broadband infrastructure. With the resignation of then Prime Minister Abdullah Badawi and the succession of Najib Tun Razak, the project by RTM was deferred indefinitely.

The advent of digital television has facilitiated Malaysia's constituent regions to launch their own public broadcasters: Sarawak's state government officially launched TVS in October 2020 after a 6-year trial period since 2014, Sabah followed suit launching the TV Sabah mobile streaming service in April 2023 with plans to establish its own station more than 40 years after the dissolving of its previous incarnation under RTM's Third Network in 1985.

== Satellite television ==
Malaysia's sole satellite television operator, MEASAT Broadcast Network Systems (a subsidiary of Astro Malaysia Holdings) launched the Astro service in launch of the MEASAT-1 satellite as part of Malaysia's commercialisation of space, Astro commenced broadcasting on 1 June 1996 with an initial offering of 3 radio stations and 22 television channels. Today, Astro has over 160 TV channels and Radio Stations, as well as 25 HD channels. They have also started their IPTV service in 2013.

=== Television ===
Channel	Name	Language	Owner	Group	Type
1	TV1	Malay	RTM	Free-to-air	Terrestrial
2	TV2	Malay	RTM	Free-to-air	Terrestrial
3	TV3	Malay	STMB	Free-to-air	Terrestrial
4	Astro Ria	Malay	Astro	Astro channels	Satellite
5	Astro SuperSport	English	Astro	Astro channels	Satellite
6	Astro AEC	Chinese	Astro	Astro channels	Satellite
7	Astro Wah Lai Toi	Cantonese	Astro	Astro channels	Satellite
8	Astro Vaanavil	Tamil	Astro	Astro channels	Satellite
9	CNN International	English	CNN	News	Satellite
10	Discovery Channel	English (Malay subtitles)	Discovery Communications	Education	Satellite
11	NBC Asia	English (Malay subtitles)	National Geographic Society	Education	Satellite
12	ESPN	English	ESPN	Sports	Satellite
13	STAR Sports	English	STAR TV	Sports	Satellite
14	HBO	English (Malay subtitles)	HBO	Movies	Satellite
15	STAR Movies	English (Malay subtitles)	STAR TV	Movies	Satellite
16	MGM Gold	English (Malay subtitles)	Metro Goldwyn Mayer	Movies	Satellite
17	Cartoon Network	English (Malay subtitles)	Cartoon Network	Animated	Satellite
18	Disney Channel	English (Malay subtitles)	The Walt Disney Company Southeast Asia	Animated	Satellite
19	STAR World	English	STAR TV	Entertainment	Satellite
20	Channel [V]	English	STAR TV	Entertainment	Satellite
21	MTV Asia	English	MTV Networks	Entertainment	Satellite
22	Phoenix Chinese Channel	Chinese	Phoenix Satellite Television	Jade	Satellite
23	STAR Chinese Movies	Cantonese (Malay subtitles)	STAR TV	Jade	Satellite
24	CCTV-4	Chinese	China Central Television (CCTV)	Jade	Satellite

It currently holds exclusive rights from the Malaysian government to offer satellite television broadcasting services in the country through the year 2017. The rights was extended to 2022 recently. However, today Astro contains more than 100 channels including local and international channels and radio channels.

There are also laws preventing too many advertisements from being aired on both radio and television, similar to the United Kingdom.

In December 2011, former prime minister Najib Tun Razak announced that the free-to-view satellite television service by Astro, NJOI, will be made available from February 2012 onwards.

== Cable TV ==
Mega TV was launched in 1995 by TV3 as the only cable television service. However, it faced stiff competition from the satellite television network Astro, and failed to expand its content. Because of this, it closed down in 2001, and was replaced by its competitor since then. In 2013, ABN Networks launched their Cable TV service together with Fiber Optic Internet as ABNXcess yet the network also failed to compete with Astro.

== Internet Protocol Television (IPTV) ==
In contrast to Internet TV, Internet Protocol Television (IPTV) refers to services operated and controlled by a single company, who may also control the 'Final Mile' to the consumers' premises.

DETV, a new paid television provider owned by REDtone, provides television and video-on-demand services on the IPTV platform, targeting the Chinese audiences in Malaysia.

However, Astro is the first broadcast company in Malaysia that introduce the IPTV services, branded as Astro IPTV in collaboration with Maxis Communications and TIME dotCom.

After that, Telekom Malaysia (TM) launched its IPTV services, currently branded as HyppTV in the second quarter of 2009, and now conducts trials with 1,000 selected households in Klang Valley, Penang and Kulim, Kedah.

TM then successfully released their IPTV based on their HSBB Unifi service which only available to Unifi subscriber through nationwide. Collaboration with Astro stopped on 1 August 2016 with termination of both Astro Supersports HD and Astro Supersports 2 HD. HyppTV is rebranded as Unifi TV starting from 12 January 2018.

== Mobile TV ==
Maxis, DiGi and U Mobile provide mobile television services for reception on third generation mobile phones. They consist of a mixture of regular channels as well as made for mobile channels with looped content. Maxis TV now offers more than 20 channels to Maxis 3G subscribers who own compatible mobile phones. Yet, Maxis is expected to roll out broadcast mobile TV services based on DVB-H in the near future.

U Mobile also provides broadcast mobile TV to users of selected 3G phones, also based on DVB-H.

In October 2008, Astro launched Astro Mobile TV which currently provides 18 channels, all of which are mobile versions of its existing channels, seven of them are under its own brand. This service is only available to Maxis subscribers with compatible 2.5G or 3G handsets, and does not reprise its role from Maxis TV.

=== Live streaming ===
Television received via the Internet may be free, subscription or pay-per-view, multicast, unicast, or peer-to-peer, streamed or downloaded, and use a variety of distribution technologies. Playback is normally via a computer and broadband Internet connection, although digital media receivers or media centre computers can be used for playback on televisions, such as a computer equipped with Windows Media Center.

== Most-viewed channels ==
Most-viewed networks since Q3 2023.

Position	Channel	Group	Share of total viewing (%)
1	TV3	Media Prima	18%
2	8TV	Media Prima	17%
3	TV9	Media Prima	14%
4	NTV7	Media Prima	2%
5	TV1	Radio Televisyen Malaysia	10%
6	TV2	Radio Televisyen Malaysia	9%
7	Okey	Radio Televisyen Malaysia	8%
8	Astro Ria	Astro Holdings Sdn Bhd	5%
9	Astro Prima	Astro Holdings Sdn Bhd	4%
10	Astro Ceria	Astro Holdings Sdn Bhd	3%

== Channels from neighbouring countries ==
Channel	Owner	Language	Transmission	Format	Country	Receiving states
Suria	Mediacorp	Malay	Digital	HDTV	Singapore	Johor
Channel 5	Mediacorp	English	Digital	HDTV	Singapore	Johor
CNA	Mediacorp	English	Digital	HDTV	Singapore	Johor
Channel U	Mediacorp	Mandarin	Digital	HDTV	Singapore	Johor
Channel 8	Mediacorp	Mandarin	Digital	HDTV	Singapore	Johor
Vasantham	Mediacorp	Tamil	Digital	HDTV	Singapore	Johor
SCTV	Surya Citra Media	Indonesian	Digital	HDTV	Indonesia	Johor; Malacca; Negeri Sembilan; Selangor; Kuala Lumpur; Putrajaya; Perak; Penang; Sarawak; Sabah
Indosiar	Surya Citra Media	Indonesian	Digital	HDTV	Indonesia	Johor; Malacca; Negeri Sembilan; Selangor; Kuala Lumpur; Putrajaya; Perak; Penang; Sarawak; Sabah
Mentari TV	Surya Citra Media	Indonesian	Digital	HDTV	Indonesia	Johor; Malacca; Negeri Sembilan; Selangor; Kuala Lumpur; Putrajaya; Perak; Penang; Sarawak; Sabah
Moji	Elang Mahkota Teknologi	Indonesian	Digital	HDTV	Indonesia	Johor; Malacca; Negeri Sembilan; Selangor; Kuala Lumpur; Putrajaya; Perak; Penang; Sarawak; Sabah
RCTI	Media Nusantara Citra	Indonesian	Digital	HDTV	Indonesia	Johor; Malacca; Negeri Sembilan; Selangor; Kuala Lumpur; Putrajaya; Perak; Penang; Sarawak; Sabah
MNCTV	Media Nusantara Citra	Indonesian	Digital	HDTV	Indonesia	Johor; Malacca; Negeri Sembilan; Selangor; Kuala Lumpur; Putrajaya; Perak; Penang; Sarawak; Sabah
GTV	Media Nusantara Citra	Indonesian	Digital	HDTV	Indonesia	Johor; Malacca; Negeri Sembilan; Selangor; Kuala Lumpur; Putrajaya; Perak; Penang; Sarawak; Sabah
iNews	Media Nusantara Citra	Indonesian	Digital	HDTV	Indonesia	Johor; Malacca; Negeri Sembilan; Selangor; Kuala Lumpur; Putrajaya; Perak; Penang; Sarawak; Sabah
Trans TV	Trans Media	Indonesian	Digital	HDTV	Indonesia	Johor; Malacca; Negeri Sembilan; Selangor; Kuala Lumpur; Putrajaya; Perak; Penang; Sarawak; Sabah
Trans7	Trans Media	Indonesian	Digital	HDTV	Indonesia	Johor; Malacca; Negeri Sembilan; Selangor; Kuala Lumpur; Putrajaya; Perak; Penang; Sarawak; Sabah
CNN Indonesia	Trans Media	Indonesian	Digital	HDTV	Indonesia	Johor; Malacca; Negeri Sembilan; Selangor; Kuala Lumpur; Putrajaya; Perak; Penang; Sarawak; Sabah
CNBC Indonesia	Trans Media	Indonesian	Digital	HDTV	Indonesia	Johor; Malacca; Negeri Sembilan; Selangor; Kuala Lumpur; Putrajaya; Perak; Penang; Sarawak; Sabah
ANTV	Visi Media Asia	Indonesian	Digital	HDTV	Indonesia	Johor; Malacca; Negeri Sembilan; Selangor; Kuala Lumpur; Putrajaya; Perak; Penang; Sarawak; Sabah
tvOne	Visi Media Asia	Indonesian	Digital	HDTV	Indonesia	Johor; Malacca; Negeri Sembilan; Selangor; Kuala Lumpur; Putrajaya; Perak; Penang; Sarawak; Sabah
VTV	Visi Media Asia	Indonesian	Digital	HDTV	Indonesia	Johor; Malacca; Negeri Sembilan; Selangor; Kuala Lumpur; Putrajaya; Perak; Penang; Sarawak; Sabah
Metro TV	Media Group	Indonesian	Digital	HDTV	Indonesia	Johor; Malacca; Negeri Sembilan; Selangor; Kuala Lumpur; Putrajaya; Perak; Penang; Sarawak; Sabah
Magna Channel	Media Group	Indonesian	Digital	HDTV	Indonesia	Johor; Malacca; Negeri Sembilan; Selangor; Kuala Lumpur; Putrajaya; Perak; Penang; Sarawak; Sabah
BN Channel	Media Group	Indonesian	Digital	HDTV	Indonesia	Johor; Malacca; Negeri Sembilan; Selangor; Kuala Lumpur; Putrajaya; Perak; Penang; Sarawak; Sabah
Kompas TV	KG Media	Indonesian	Digital	HDTV	Indonesia	Johor; Malacca; Negeri Sembilan; Selangor; Kuala Lumpur; Putrajaya; Perak; Penang; Sarawak; Sabah
MDTV	MDTV Media Technologies	Indonesian	Digital	HDTV	Indonesia	Johor; Malacca; Negeri Sembilan; Selangor; Kuala Lumpur; Putrajaya; Perak; Penang; Sarawak; Sabah
RTV	Rajawali Corpora	Indonesian	Digital	HDTV	Indonesia	Johor; Malacca; Negeri Sembilan; Selangor; Kuala Lumpur; Putrajaya; Perak; Penang; Sarawak; Sabah
BTV	B Universe	Indonesian	Digital	HDTV	Indonesia	Johor; Malacca; Negeri Sembilan; Selangor; Kuala Lumpur; Putrajaya; Perak; Penang; Sarawak; Sabah
Nusantara TV	NT Corp	Indonesian	Digital	HDTV	Indonesia	Johor; Malacca; Negeri Sembilan; Selangor; Kuala Lumpur; Putrajaya; Perak; Penang; Sarawak; Sabah
Garuda TV	Digdaya Media Nusantara	Indonesian	Digital	HDTV	Indonesia	Johor; Malacca; Negeri Sembilan; Selangor; Kuala Lumpur; Putrajaya; Perak; Penang; Sarawak; Sabah
Sin Po TV	Sin Po Media	Indonesian	Digital	HDTV	Indonesia	Johor; Malacca; Negeri Sembilan; Selangor; Kuala Lumpur; Putrajaya; Perak; Penang; Sarawak; Sabah
TVRI Nasional	LPP Televisi Republik Indonesia	Indonesian	Digital	HDTV	Indonesia	Johor; Malacca; Negeri Sembilan; Selangor; Kuala Lumpur; Putrajaya; Perak; Penang; Sarawak; Sabah
TVRI Sport	LPP Televisi Republik Indonesia	Indonesian	Digital	HDTV	Indonesia	Johor; Malacca; Negeri Sembilan; Selangor; Kuala Lumpur; Putrajaya; Perak; Penang; Sarawak; Sabah
TVRI World	LPP Televisi Republik Indonesia	English	Digital	HDTV	Indonesia	Johor; Malacca; Negeri Sembilan; Selangor; Kuala Lumpur; Putrajaya; Perak; Penang; Sarawak; Sabah
RTB Perdana	RTB	Malay	Digital	HDTV	Brunei	Sarawak; Sabah; Labuan
RTB Aneka	RTB	Malay	Digital	HDTV	Brunei	Sarawak; Sabah; Labuan
RTB Sukmaindera	RTB	Malay	Digital	HDTV	Brunei	Sarawak; Sabah; Labuan
TV5	Royal Thai Army	Thai	Digital	HDTV	Thailand	Terengganu; Kelantan; Perak; Kedah; Perlis
NBT	The Government Public Relations Department	Thai	Digital	HDTV	Thailand	Terengganu; Kelantan; Perak; Kedah; Perlis
Thai PBS	Thai Public Broadcasting Service	Thai	Digital	HDTV	Thailand	Terengganu; Kelantan; Perak; Kedah; Perlis
Thai Parliament Television	The Secretariat of The House of Representatives	Thai	Digital	SDTV	Thailand	Terengganu; Kelantan; Perak; Kedah; Perlis
NBT South	The Government Public Relations Department	Thai	Digital	HDTV	Thailand	Terengganu; Kelantan; Perak; Kedah; Perlis
TNN16	TrueVisions	Thai	Digital	SDTV	Thailand	Terengganu; Kelantan; Perak; Kedah; Perlis
JKN18	JKN Global Group	Thai	Digital	SDTV	Thailand	Terengganu; Kelantan; Perak; Kedah; Perlis
Nation TV	Nation Group	Thai	Digital	SDTV	Thailand	Terengganu; Kelantan; Perak; Kedah; Perlis
Workpoint TV	Workpoint	Thai	Digital	SDTV	Thailand	Terengganu; Kelantan; Perak; Kedah; Perlis
True4U	TrueVisions	Thai	Digital	SDTV	Thailand	Terengganu; Kelantan; Perak; Kedah; Perlis
GMM 25	GMM Grammy	Thai	Digital	SDTV	Thailand	Terengganu; Kelantan; Perak; Kedah; Perlis
Channel 8	RS Group	Thai	Digital	SDTV	Thailand	Terengganu; Kelantan; Perak; Kedah; Perlis
MONO29	MONO Next	Thai	Digital	SDTV	Thailand	Terengganu; Kelantan; Perak; Kedah; Perlis
Channel 9 MCOT HD	MCOT	Thai	Digital	HDTV	Thailand	Terengganu; Kelantan; Perak; Kedah; Perlis
One 31	GMM Grammy	Thai	Digital	HDTV	Thailand	Terengganu; Kelantan; Perak; Kedah; Perlis
Thairath TV	Thairath Group	Thai	Digital	HDTV	Thailand	Terengganu; Kelantan; Perak; Kedah; Perlis
Channel 3 HD	BEC Multimedia	Thai	Digital	HDTV	Thailand	Terengganu; Kelantan; Perak; Kedah; Perlis
Amarin TV	Amarin Group	Thai	Digital	HDTV	Thailand	Terengganu; Kelantan; Perak; Kedah; Perlis
Channel 7	Bangkok Broadcasting & Television	Thai	Digital	HDTV	Thailand	Terengganu; Kelantan; Perak; Kedah; Perlis
PPTV	Bangkok Media & Broadcasting	Thai	Digital	HDTV	Thailand	Terengganu; Kelantan; Perak; Kedah; Perlis

== See also ==
- List of television stations in Malaysia
- List of Malay language television channels
