= Television in Brunei =

Television in Brunei was introduced in 1975. It operates as a three-channel monopoly operated by state broadcaster Radio Televisyen Brunei. Until 2022, Kristal-Astro provided subscription television services.

== History ==
The first television signals received in the vicinity of Brunei were those of TV Sabah, whose test broadcasts started in February 1971. When regular broadcasts started the following month, there was an increase in television sets. As part of a five-year plan, the introduction of television became a possibility.

RTB started testing its signals on VHF channel 5 on 1 March 1975 in Bandar Seri Begawan; on 10 July, its broadcasts became regular. In 1976, a second transmitter in Seria on channel 8 was added.

Beginning 1 January 1994, RTB Sukmaindera (later renamed Brunei International) launched, a one-hour international service delivered by the Palapa B2P satellite.

Kristal started delivering a 14-channel subscription television service on 2 January 1999, in order to combat the rise in illegal satellite dishes. The broadcast of MTV was cut from the operator due to moral concerns, but was later reinstated with certain programming blocked. Kristal-Astro, a subscription satellite service, started on 25 January 2000, when Kristal signed an agreement with Astro.

RTB rearranged its line-up of channels with the introduction of digital terrestrial television in Brunei: the existing channel became RTB1 while RTB2 launched in 2006 as an entertainment channel. Around 2008, RTB3, an HD channel, started with a similar mix of programmes to those seen on RTB2. Brunei International was renamed RTB4 and an Islamic channel, RTB5, launched. On 11 April 2017, RTB cut the number of channels from five to three, with RTB1 and RTB5 merging to form RTB Perdana, RTB2 and RTB3 merging to form RTB Aneka and RTB4 becoming RTB Sukmaindera.

In January 2022, Kristal-Astro announced its closure on 31 March. Subscribers were resorted to use the availability of overspill signals from Malaysian digital terrestrial television provider MYTV Broadcasting as an alternative.

== See also ==
- Mass media in Brunei
- Telecommunications in Brunei
- List of Malay language television channels
