= List of Malay-language television channels =

This is a list of Malay-language television channels and channels that air Malay-language TV shows.

== Brunei ==
- Radio Television Brunei (RTB)
  - RTB Perdana
  - RTB Aneka
  - RTB Sukmaindera

== Malaysia ==
=== Current ===
- Radio Televisyen Malaysia (RTM)
  - TV1
  - TV2
  - TV Okey
  - Berita RTM
  - Sukan+
- Media Prima
  - TV3
  - DidikTV KPM
  - TV9
- Bernama
  - Bernama TV
- AlHijrah Media Corporation
  - TV AlHijrah
- Sarawak Media Group
  - TVS
- MY Hankuk TV
  - Hankuk TV
- MYTV Broadcasting
  - SIARA TV
- Astro (By channel listing)
  - Astro Ria HD (104)
  - Astro Prima HD (105)
  - Astro Oasis HD (106)
  - Astro Citra HD (108) (selected programmes only)
  - Astro Rania HD (112)
  - Astro Aura HD (113)
  - KBS World HD (392)
  - Astro Daebak HD (393)
  - tvN HD (395)
  - K-Plus HD (396)
  - Astro Boo HD (404) (selected programmes only)
  - Astro Showtime HD (411)
  - tvN Movies HD (416)
  - Astro Awani HD (501)
  - Love Nature HD (550)
  - History HD (555) (selected programmes only)
  - CGTN Documentary HD (556) (selected programmes only)
  - Astro Tutor TV HD (603)
  - Astro Ceria HD (611) (dual sound)
  - Cartoon Network HD (615) (bilingual - English, Malay)
  - Nickelodeon HD (616) (bilingual - English, Malay)
  - Nick Jr. HD (617) (bilingual - English, Malay)
  - Asian Food Network HD (709) (selected programmes only)
  - Astro Arena HD (801)
  - Astro Arena 2 HD (802)
  - Astro Arena Bola HD (803)
  - Astro Arena Bola 2 HD (804)
- Unifi TV (By channel listing)
  - Salam HD (113)
  - Sensasi HD (116)
  - Inspirasi HD (118)
  - DEGUP HD (120)
  - SIAR HD (121)
  - Dunia Sinema HD (128)
  - Pesona HD (141)
  - RTM Parlimen HD (633)
  - Unifi Sports HD (701)

=== Former or defunct ===
- Rangkaian Ketiga (1971-1985), shut down
- MetroVision (1995-1999), shut down and revived as 8TV
- Channel 9 (2003–2005), shut down and revived as TV9
- 8TV, no longer broadcasts any Malay-language programmes
- TV Pendidikan, ceased broadcasting in 2008. Replaced by EDUWEBTV.
- Astro Kirana, ceased broadcasting on 18 May 2009 due to low viewership, replaced with Astro Citra on 1 June 2009
- Astro Aruna, ceased transmissions in Malaysia, Singapore and Brunei due to declining viewership of the channel.
- Channel W (2011-2019), shut down
- WBC, ceased broadcasting on October 2012 due to financial difficulties
- Disney Channel, ceased broadcasting and transmission on 1 January 2021 due to arrival of Disney+ Hotstar in Malaysia six months later and replaced by Boomerang HD on 15 December 2020.
- Disney Junior HD, ceased broadcasting and transmission on 1 January 2021 due to arrival of Disney+ Hotstar in Malaysia six months later and replaced by Nick Jr. HD on 15 December 2020.
- Disney XD HD, ceased broadcasting and transmission in Southeast Asia on 1 January 2021 due to a review of Disney's business in the region, but content moving to Disney+ Hotstar which eventually was launched in Malaysia on 1 June 2021.
- Astro Box Office Movies Tayangan Hebat HD ceased broadcasting and transmission on 1 June 2021 due to the low popularity, but Astro OD (On Demand) service continue reserves.
- Fox Sports 3 HD ceased broadcasting and transmission on 1 October 2021, with several of its content were moved to Astro SuperSport 5 HD that was launched on the same time.
- Oh!K HD ceased broadcasting on 1 June 2022. Both channels were replaced by K-Plus HD on 18 May 2022.
- National Geographic HD and Nat Geo Wild HD ceased broadcasting on 1 February 2023. Both channels were replaced by Global Trekker HD and Love Nature 4K and HD on 15 January 2023.
- Astro Premier HD ceased broadcasting on 20 November 2024.
- Astro Warna HD ceased broadcasting on 3 December 2024.
- Global Trekker HD ceased broadcasting on 15 October 2025. Both channels were replaced by CGTN Documentary HD on 1 October 2025.
- ONE HD ceased broadcasting on 1 July 2026. Both channels were replaced by Astro Daebak HD.
- SUKE TV (2022-2026), shut down
- TV6 (2021-2026), shut down
- Awesome TV (2020-2026), shut down
- Enjoy TV5 (2023-2026), shut down

== Singapore ==
- Mediacorp
  - Suria HD
- StarHub TV
  - KBS World HD (815)
  - tvN HD (824)
  - HUB E City HD Within Bahasa Malay Subtitles (825)
  - HUB Ru Yi Hokkien HD VOD (Within Bahasa Malay Subtitles) (852)
  - HUB VV Drama HD Within Bahasa Malay Subtitles (855)
  - Astro Warna HD (118)
  - Astro Sensasi HD (123)
- Singtel TV
  - Asian Food Network HD (selected programmes only) (256)
  - Jia Le HD With Bahasa Malay Subtitles (Channel 502)
  - KBS World HD (Channel 606)
  - E-Le HD with Bahasa Malay Subtitles (Channel 11 & 501)
  - tvN HD (Channel 619)
  - Astro Prima HD (Channel 602)
  - Astro Ria HD (Channel 608)
  - Astro World HD On Demand
  - Drama Sangat TV3 HD On Demand (Channel 605)

=== Former or defunct ===
- StarHub TV
  - TV1 HD (178) (Ceased since November 2019)
  - Hub Sensasi HD (123) (Ceased and Rebrand in Astro Sensasi HD since 28 April 2022)
  - Nat Geo Wild HD (413) (Ceased since 1 October 2023)
  - ONE HD (124) (Ceased since 1 July 2026)
- Singtel TV
  - Nat Geo Wild HD (207) (Ceased since 1 October 2023)
  - Astro Citra HD On Demand (603) (Ceased since 1 December 2025)
  - Astro Maya HD On Demand (609) (Ceased since 1 December 2025)
  - ONE HD (604) (Ceased since 1 July 2026)

== See also ==
- List of television stations in Malaysia
- Television in Singapore
- Television in Brunei
