= Telecommunications in Brunei =

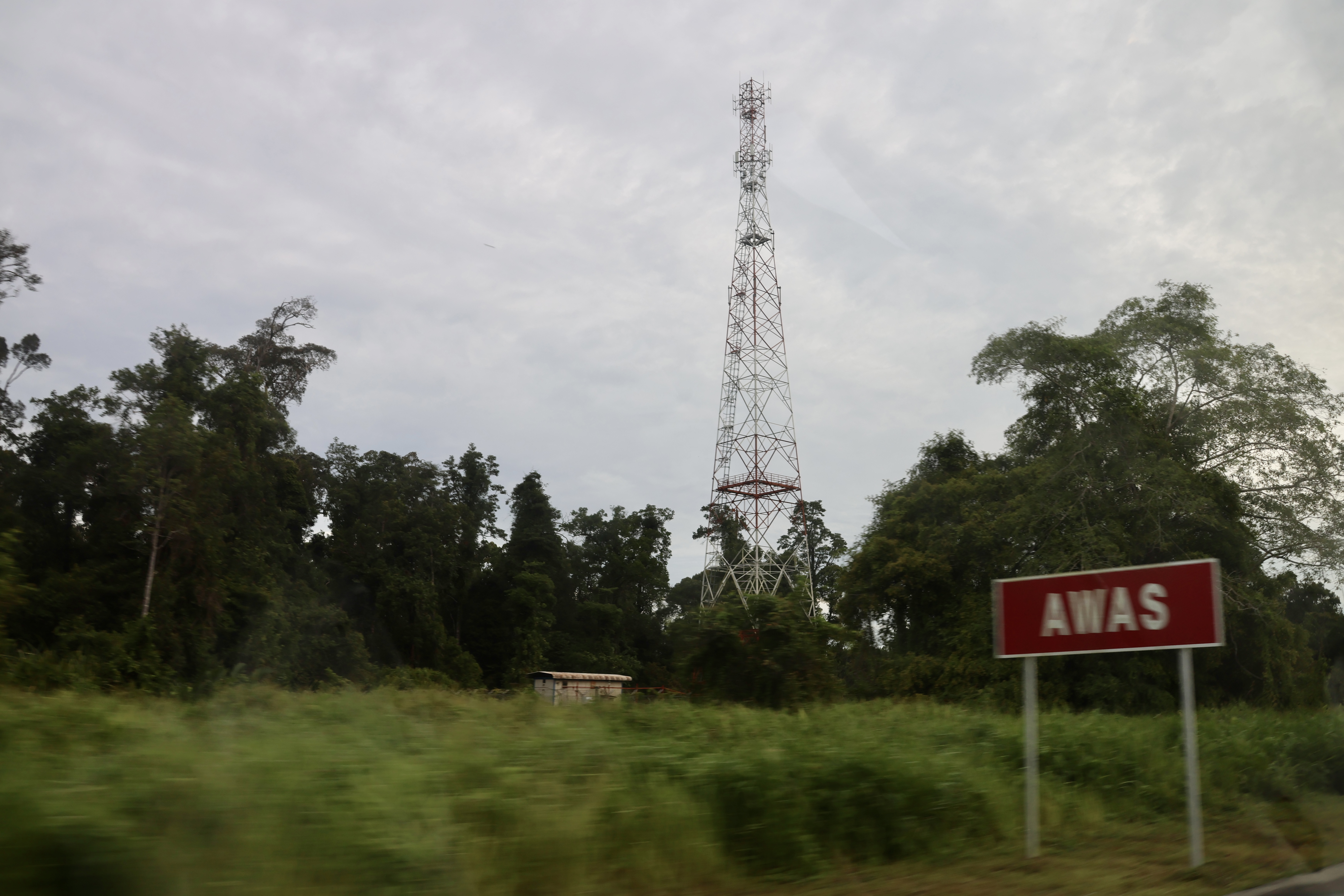
A telecommunication tower in Belait District.

Brunei possesses an extensive system of telecommunications, including telephone and mobile phone service, internet service, television and radio. The majority of Bruneians have access to these services: for every 100 Bruneians there are 118 mobile phone subscriptions, and 99% of the population uses the internet. The official radio and television network, Radio Television Brunei (RTB), operates five channels, and satellite systems make foreign broadcasts accessible as well.

== Telecommunications ==
=== Telephone ===
There is telephone service throughout the country and there is international service is to Southeast Asia, Middle East, Western Europe, and the US.

- Main lines in use: 122,204 (2022)
- Mobile phones: 603,486 (2021)

Landing points for the SEA-ME-WE-3, SJC, AAG, Lubuan-Brunei Submarine Cable via optical telecommunications submarine cables that provides links to Asia, the Middle East, Southeast Asia, Africa, Australia, and the US; satellite earth stations - 2 Intelsat (1 Indian Ocean and 1 Pacific Ocean) (2019)

IDD Country Code: +673

=== Mobile Telephone ===
Brunei has 3 major telco namely DST, Imagine (TelBru) and Progresif which offers prepaid and postpaid plan. UNN is the Single Wholesale Network with holds all the telecommunication infrastructures in Brunei.

== Internet ==
- Internet service providers: 3 (2025), Imagine, Progresif Cellular and Datastream Digital
- Country code: .bn
- Internet fixed subscriptions: 49,452 (2020)
- Internet users: 410,800 (2019)

=== Broadband ===
Brunei's Internet service was monopolized by Telekom Brunei. ADSL speeds were ranging from 512 kbit/s to the maximum speed of 1 Mbit/s through ADSL2+ broadband. 1 Mbit/s was introduced in 2006 and was priced at BND$128 per month (Equivalent to Singapore currency). It was well known that the Brunei's broadband ranging from 512 kbit/s to 1 Mbit/s is one of the most expensive in the world. The limited market in Brunei means that new developments in the telecommunications sector is stagnant.

In 2002, Telekom Brunei was incorporated become Telekom Brunei Berhad (TelBru). In 2008, the internet were improved with dramatically with speeds ranging from 1 Mbit/s to maximum speed of 5 Mbit/s. Price starting from B$65 to B$105 per month respectively.

Bandwidth	Plan	Charges (BND)
1Mbit/s	Value Surf	$39/month
2Mbit/s	Lite Surf	$59/month
3.5Mbit/s	Super Surf	$79/month
5Mbit/s	Premium Surf	$105/month

In 2012, Telekom Brunei started deploying its FTTH network capable of 100 Mbit/s through a contract awarded to Huawei. They aimed to provide FTTH coverage to around 85% of the population by 2017.

In 2016 Telbru drastically reduced the price and increased the speeds of its broadband plans. Due to the fact that a significant number of people were now connected via FTTH and not via the old copper cables.

On 1 March 2018 Telbru rolled out their new 'high speed' broadband plans They also split the plans which have unlimited quota into 'unlimited plans'

In 2017 Forbes reported that Brunei had the 4th most expensive broadband service in the world

Broadband Plans Effective 1 March 2018
Type of plan	Bandwidth Up To	Monthly Charge	Quota
Quota Based	10 Mbit/s	$25	50GB
Quota Based	10 Mbit/s	$39	100GB
Quota Based	15 Mbit/s	$59	200GB
Quota Based	20 Mbit/s	$75	250GB
Quota Based	20 Mbit/s	$99	350GB
High Speed Quota Based	30 Mbit/s	$75	50GB
High Speed Quota Based	45 Mbit/s	$135	100GB
High Speed Quota Based	60 Mbit/s	$240	200GB
High Speed Quota Based	100 Mbit/s	$290	250GB
High Speed Quota Based	300 Mbit/s	$350	350GB
Unlimited	30 Mbit/s	$199	N/A
Unlimited	45 Mbit/s	$259	N/A
Unlimited	60 Mbit/s	$339	N/A
Unlimited	100 Mbit/s	$459	N/A
Unlimited	300 Mbit/s	$999	N/A

On 4 September 2019, The UNN took over all of the telecommunications infrastructure in Brunei. By doing so they aimed to provide equal infrastructure to all the isps in the country. This brought an end to a long held monopoly by Imagine Sdn Bhd (Formerly Known as Telbru) over the home broadband market with the introduction of Datastream Digital's 'Infinity' home broadband plans on 24 January 2020.

== Television ==
- Terrestrial TV Stations (Free to air)

In some areas residents may enjoy some of the Malaysian TV channels

1. RTB Perdana (Formerly known as RTB 1 and RTB 5) - An 17.5-hour national flagship channel of Radio Television Brunei aired news and information programs, with local and sinetron Indonesia series in 1080p HDTV.
2. RTB Aneka (Formerly known as RTB 2 and RTB 3 HD) - A 16.5-hour second channel of Radio Television Brunei airs entertainment programmes in 1080p HDTV.
3. RTB Sukmaindera (Formerly known as RTB 4) - A 24-hour international satellite television channel airing all of RTB programs both locally and internationally in 1080p HDTV.
- Pay TV (Satellite TV) 1 - Kristal Astro

== Radio ==
All radio stations in the country use FM. 5 radio stations are broadcast by the state controlled Radio Television Brunei. The British Forces Broadcast Service (BFBS) broadcasts 2 other stations in the country. Reception from some Malaysia stations can be received.

== Recent developments ==
In 2023, ULAP Networks, a global cloud communications company, was awarded a Services-Based Operations (SeTi) license by the Authority for Info-communications Technology Industry (AITI). This license allows ULAP to offer telecommunications services including voice and cloud infrastructure within Brunei, supporting the country's digital transformation and connectivity goals.
