= Garuda (disambiguation) =

Garuda is a divine bird in Hindu and Buddhist mythology.

Garuda or Garudan may also refer to:

- Brahminy kite, a kite (bird) of India

== Film and television ==
- Garuda (2004 film), a Thai monster film
- Garuda (2022 film), an Indian Kannada-language film by Dhanakumar K
- Garudan (2023 film), an Indian Malayalam-language film by Arun Varma
- Garudan (2024 film), an Indian Tamil-language film by R. S. Durai Senthilkumar
- Dharm Yoddha Garud or Garud, a 2022 Indian television series about the Hindu mythological bird
- Garuda TV, an Indonesian channel news television
- Garuda TV (Netherlands), a defunct Dutch television channel

== Fiction ==
- Garuda (video game character), a character from the Street Fighter EX series of games
- Ike Garuda, a character in The Transmutation of Ike Garuda
- Garuda Vega, a ship in the 2017 Indian Telugu-language film PSV Garuda Vega
- Garuda, the protagonist of the 1991 Indian Kannada-language film Garuda Dhwaja
- Garuda, a character from the Indian film franchise KGF
- Garudas, a race of humanoid avians from Bas-Lag in Perdido Street Station by China Miéville
- Garuda, a villain in Combattler V
- Jet Garuda, a mecha in Chōjin Sentai Jetman
- Garuda, a warship in Godzilla vs. Mechagodzilla II
- Garuda, a recurring enemy in the Final Fantasy video games series; see Final Fantasy XIV
- Garuda, a villain in Lost Girl
- Garuda 1 and Garuda 2, characters in Ace Combat 6: Fires of Liberation
- Garuda, a floating country in the 2015 action-adventure video game Rodea the Sky Soldier
- Garuda, a playable character in the 2013 third-person action video game Warframe

== Other ==
- Garuda of Gour, a fourteenth-century prince
- Garuda 1, a satellite
- Garuda Contingent, Indonesian peacekeepers serving under the United Nations
- Garuda F.C. PH, an amateur association football club in Philippines
- Garuda Indonesia, the national airline of Indonesia
- Garuda Mas, a bus company in Indonesia
- Garuda Party, a political party in Indonesia
- Garuda Upanishad, one of 108 Upanishadic Hindu scriptures
- GARUDA, an Indian grid-computing initiative
- INS Garuda, an Indian Naval Air Station in Kochi, Kerala
- VAQ-134 or the Garudas, a United States Navy EA-18G Growler squadron
- Garuda Pancasila, the National emblem of Indonesia
- Garuda, a bus service operated by Andhra Pradesh State Road Transport Corporation
- Garuda Linux, an Arch Linux based operating system
- Garuda (rocket), a sounding rocket

== See also ==
- Garud Commando Force, an elite special forces unit of the Indian Air Force
- Garudamon, a Digimon
- Garudayaksa F.C., a professional football club from Indonesia
- The Dream of Garuda, a 1994 Japanese film
