= Radio Television Brunei =

Bruneian public broadcaster

Coordinates: 4.8907905°N 114.9404052°E

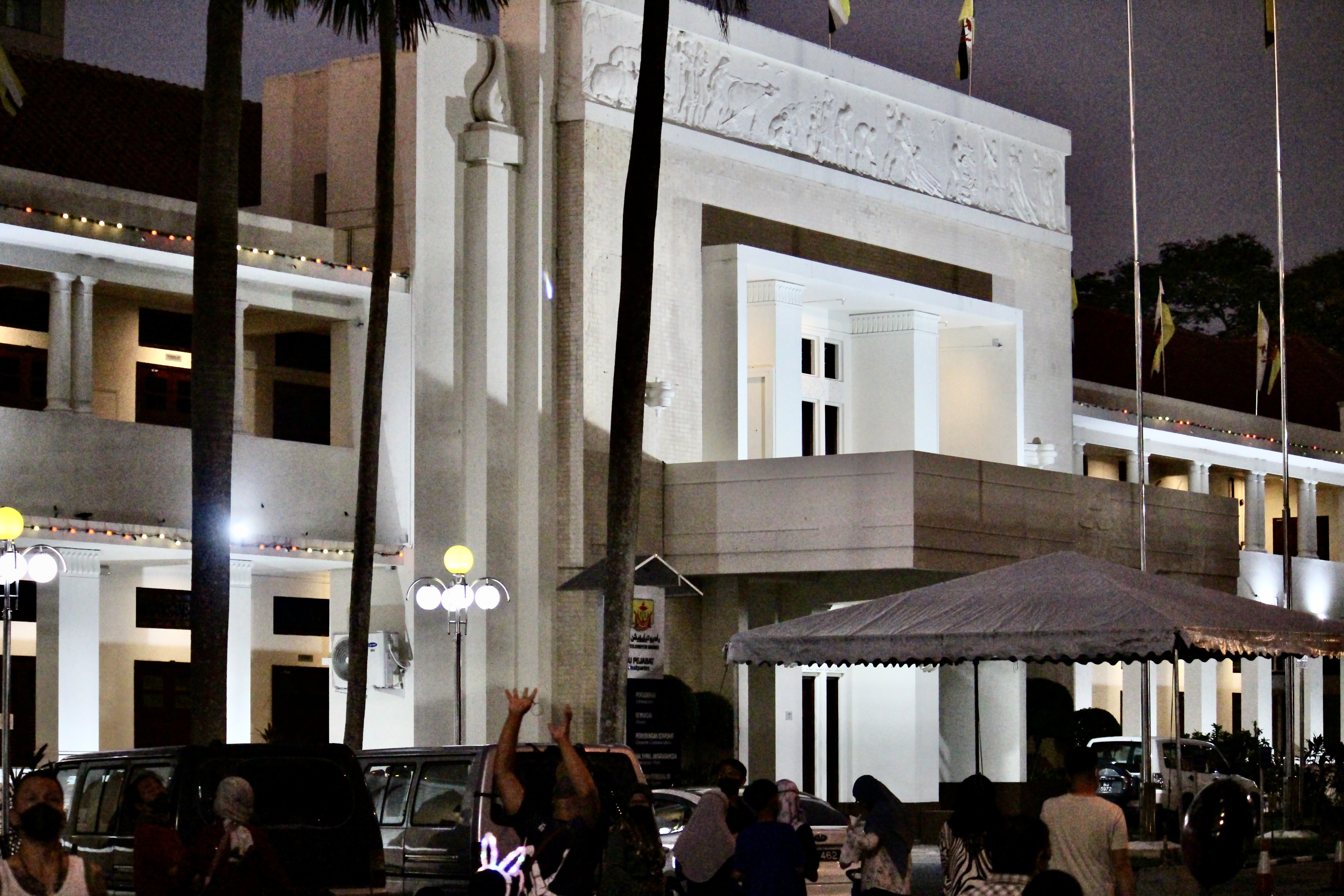
- RTB's headquarters in Pusat Bandar, Bandar Seri Begawan
- Native name: Radio Televisyen Brunei
- Type: Government agency
- Industry: Mass media
- Predecessors: Radio Brunei (1957–1975); Televisyen Brunei (1975)
- Founded: 2 May 1957; 69 years ago
- Headquarters: Secretariat Building, Jalan Elizabeth II, Bandar Seri Begawan, Brunei BA8610
- Area served: Nationwide (Note: Also available in Malaysia (through its international border located in the northern part of the state of Sarawak and the island territory of Labuan) and also worldwide through its international television channel, RTB Sukmaindera.)
- Key people: Pengiran Ismail Pengiran Muhammad Kifli (Acting Director)
- Products: Broadcasting; web portals
- Services: Television; radio; online
- Owner: Government of Brunei
- Number of employees: 5,000 (2021)
- Parent: Prime Minister's Office
- Website: www.rtb.gov.bn

Radio Television Brunei (Malay: Radio Televisyen Brunei, Jawi: راديو تيليۏيشن بروني, officially abbreviated as RTB) is the national public broadcaster of Brunei, headquartered at the Secretariat Building, Bandar Seri Begawan. Radio Brunei made its first broadcast on 2 May 1957, with a television service starting on 1 March 1975. Modelled after Radio Televisyen Malaysia (RTM), which is a government department, RTB came into its current state with its present name in 1975 after the merger of its radio and television services.

RTB monopolises the free-to-air television in the country, and also radio until 1999, when the country's only commercial radio station, Kristal FM was founded. Currently, it operates 3 television channels and 5 radio stations as well as an over-the-top streaming service, RTB Go. The broadcaster's logo was based from the national emblem of Brunei.

== History ==
Brunei started its radio broadcasting on 2 May 1957 under the name Radio Brunei with an Eid al-Fitr message from Sultan Omar Ali Saifuddien III. There was one studio which broadcast for 45 minutes each evening from 8:00 to 8:45 pm. The range of the single 1.2Kw transmitter was only five miles around the capital Brunei Town and surrounding areas. The first radio station would later become known as Nasional FM.

By September 1958, Radio Brunei began on air six hours a day after underwent a test period for two weeks.

In 1974, RTB had only 171 staff and three transmitting sites giving almost 100% coverage of the country and beyond.

Ahead of the launching of television service in Brunei, the broadcaster sent more than five of its staff members to undergo training at Radio Television Singapore (RTS) in late January 1975.

Radio Television Brunei launched its first pilot television broadcast on 1 February 1975 when RTB Television Brunei test transmissions began. Official regular television services began on 1 March 1975 from Brunei-Muara District. RTB1 was officially opened by the Sultan of Brunei, Hassanal Bolkiah on 9 July 1975, with the Radio Brunei and Television Brunei identities merged to become Radio Television Brunei, abbreviated as RTB. There were only three staff members in the RTB studio and four to attend the transmitter.

- Phase 1 - Used part of the Radio Studios as the television station.
- Phase 2 - Utilising the current multi-purpose studio complex which was fully commissioned by 1980. A second television transmitter was commissioned at Brunei-Muara District on 1 March 1976.

On 1 March 1976 was also the year of the first outside television broadcast which was the coverage of His Majesty's birthday parade from the then 'Town Padang'. The television project was budgeted at B$35M. FM Stereo Radio Services from Brunei-Muara District started on 1 March 1977. At the same time, two high power medium wave stations in Brunei-Muara District commenced transmission of the Malay language service. Today, around 1,100 employees work in RTB. Coverage by radio and television is almost 100% for Brunei.

In 1980, RTB sent 16 of its staff members to Singapore where they underwent on-the-job training at the Singapore Broadcasting Corporation (SBC), the forerunner of Mediacorp.

In 1982, RTB sent another 4 of its staff members to undergo certain training at the SBC in Singapore. That same year, it acquired 75% of programmes produced by SBC.

In 1983, RTB, through its Training Unit, conducted a training programme for its staff and officers in preparation for the celebration of Brunei's independence by 1984.

RTB aired a joint radio-TV simulcast of the ceremony of the declaration of independence day on New Year's Eve 1983 and the first National Day Parade in 1984.

In 1985, RTB allowed dress code reforms for its Muslim news presenters, with men having their songkoks dispensed with and women having their traditional hijabs shed.

In 1987, an RTB senior officer proposed an establishment of a consortium to operate an ASEAN satellite for a news and TV program exchange for all ASEAN broadcasting stations.

On 24 December 1993, RTB introduced a one-hour satellite broadcast service using the Indonesian Palapa B2P satellite. The service, named RTB Sukmaindera, was set to start on 1 January 1994. The primary target audience was Bruneians in the Malay archipelago, delivering news, current affairs programmes and documentaries produced by the broadcaster. The service also became a basis for one of its eponymous TV channels, which was launched in 2003.

Towards the end of the 20th century, four more radio stations were established: vernacular station Pilihan FM on 31 December 1995, youth station Pelangi FM on 1 January 1996, family station Harmoni FM on 15 July 1996 and Islamic station Nur Islam FM on 2 May 1997. In 2001, RTB started its NetRadio service where its radio stations became available for streaming on the Internet.

In 2002, RTB commissioned an initial transmission consultancy project on incorporating a digital broadcasting service, which was conducted by NTL Asia Pacific. On 30 September 2002, the broadcaster and Kristal TV signed an agreement with Singaporean news channel Channel NewsAsia (CNA) to broaden the news channel's reach to Bruneian audiences.

On 9 July 2003, 24-hour international television channel RTB4 International went on the air. By 2010, High Definition (HD) entertainment channel RTB3 and Islamic channel RTB5 were added to RTB's television network, but RTB3 and RTB5 each had only 6 hours of transmission per day and only broadcast in the evening.

Up until 2008, the sole RTB television broadcast twice a day during weekdays and broadcast continuously during weekends, usually until midnight. In May 2008, the broadcaster planned to launch an HDTV service and began carried out HD trials using a 100Watt transmitter, located at the Subok earth station near Bandar Seri Begawan.

RTB, alongside Thai Public Broadcasting Service (Thai PBS), Educational Broadcasting System (EBS) and OBS, have secured a content deal with Singaporean media company Bomanbridge Media in 2015, which saw it acquiring factual programming in the environmental genre in high definition.

The broadcaster discontinued the satellite service for RTB4 on 28 February 2017.

On 11 April 2017, RTB made a major rebranding project for its TV channels. RTB1 and RTB5 merged to form RTB Perdana, while RTB2 and RTB3 combined as RTB Aneka and RTB4 renamed as RTB Sukmaindera. The cause for the reduction in the number of channels was that viewers preferred at least two of the five channels. The rebranding was made as part of RTB's plan to transition the then-current analogue television service to digital television.

On 2 May 2017, RTB celebrated the 60th anniversary of its radio service. In November 2017, the broadcaster became the host of ASEAN Digital Radio Broadcasting.

RTM announced it would officially discontinue the analogue broadcasting service from its transmitter in Bukit Subok on 31 December 2017. The broadcaster concurrently migrated to digital HD service on 1 January 2018. During the RTB Carnival 2019 at The Airport Mall, the RTB director, Haji Md Suffian Haji Bungsu said that the broadcaster had highlighted the improvements on three fields of excellence, namely "operations, productivity and organisation".

In 2020, RTB moved its headquarters from its old headquarters in Jalan Stoney to Secretariat Building, Jalan Elizabeth II. The broadcaster signed a memorandum of understanding with the Universiti Teknologi Brunei to create a mutual partnership in the creative media industry.

In 2021, RTB began to air educational programmes to provide "additional learning support", which would be aired during school days.

The broadcaster's new TV visual presentation was launched on 9 July 2025, concurrently with the rebranding of Studio 4 to Golden Jubilee TV Studio.

== Properties and facilities ==
=== Bandar Seri Begawan ===
- RTB Headquarters (Secretariat Building, Jalan Elizabeth II)
- RTB Sungai Akar Broadcasting Complex
- RTB Centre for Broadcasting Development (CfBD)
- Berakas RTB Orchestra Unit Building

=== Tutong District ===
- RTB Tutong District Branch, Tutong

=== Belait District ===
- RTB Belait District Branch, Kuala Belait

=== Temburong District ===
- RTB Temburong District Branch, Bangar

== Services ==
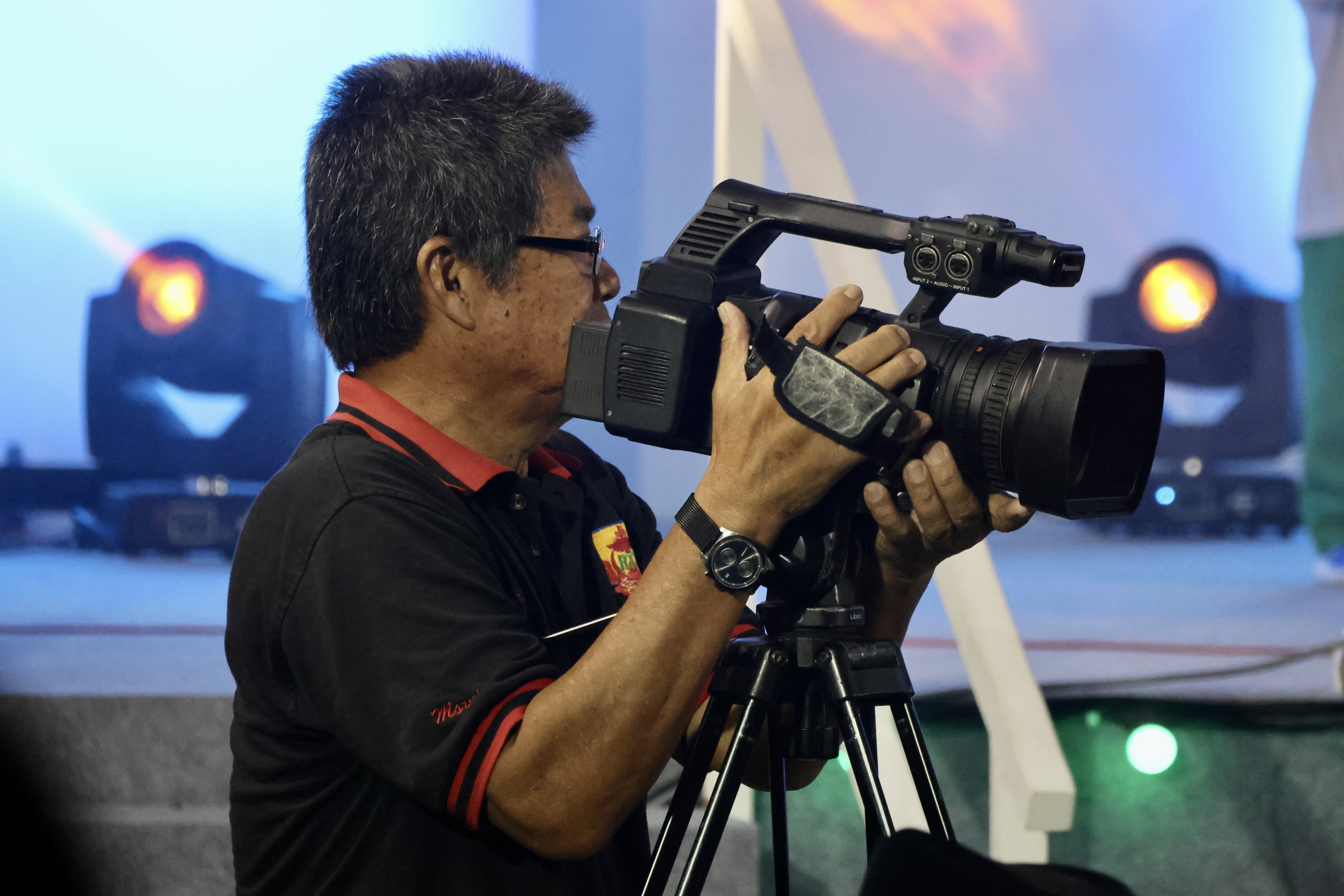
RTB camera operator during a national event in 2023.

=== Radio ===
Logo	Station	Frequencies (Area/Transmitter)	Language	Format	Ref
	Nasional FM	92.3 MHz (Bandar Seri Begawan/Bukit Subok); 93.8 MHz (Kuala Belait/Andulau)	Malay	News and Full-service	
	Pilihan FM	95.9 MHz (Bandar Seri Begawan/Bukit Subok); 96.9 MHz (Kuala Belait/Andulau)	English, Chinese (Mandarin) and Nepali	Infotainment, Top 40 (CHR) and Oldies	
	Pelangi FM	91.4 MHz (Bandar Seri Begawan/Bukit Subok); 91.0 MHz (Kuala Belait/Andulau)	Malay and English	Infotainment, Top 40 (CHR) and Talk radio	
	Harmoni FM	94.1 MHz (Bandar Seri Begawan/Bukit Subok); 97.7 MHz (Kuala Belait/Andulau)	Malay	Classic hits and Talk radio	
	Nur Islam FM	93.3 MHz (Bandar Seri Begawan/Bukit Subok); 94.9 MHz (Kuala Belait/Andulau)	Malay	Religion (Islam)	

=== Television ===
All logos of the RTB television channels consist of the italic letters R, T and B in three separate boxes, similar to pre-1998 BBC logos, with the channel's name below.

- RTB Perdana's logo is blue. The word "perdana" is presented in lower case.
- RTB Aneka's logo is orange. The word "Aneka" is presented in sentence case, the capital letter A is white superimposed on an orange diamond with grey shadow behind it.
- RTB Sukmaindera's logo is green. The word "SUKMAINDERA" is presented in upper case.

Name	Language	Programming	24-hours	Ref
RTB Perdana	Malay, English and Indonesian	News, culture, entertainment and sports	No	
RTB Aneka	Malay, English, Korean, Tagalog, Chinese (Mandarin), Turkish and Thai	Culture, entertainment, children, sports and education	No	
RTB Sukmaindera	Malay and English	News, culture, entertainment, children and sports	Yes	

=== Digital platforms ===
RTB GO logo.

RTB GO is RTB's Over-the-top media service (OTT). It covers viewers across multiple devices such as computers, tablets, smartphones. The service's website contains all RTB's radio stations and television channels except for RTB Perdana. However, RTB Aneka and RTB GO Live are not available for view outside Brunei. The Android TV apps version of RTB GO was launched in December 2023.

== Flagship programmes ==
- Rampai Pagi (Jawi: رمڤاي ڤاڬي, Morning Medley) - An all-time breakfast television programme in the form of a talk show, which airs on RTB Perdana and RTB Sukmaindera.

== See also ==
- Mass media in Brunei
- Television in Brunei
- List of Malay language television channels
