= Garuda (rocket) =

Nepalese sounding rocket

GARUDA
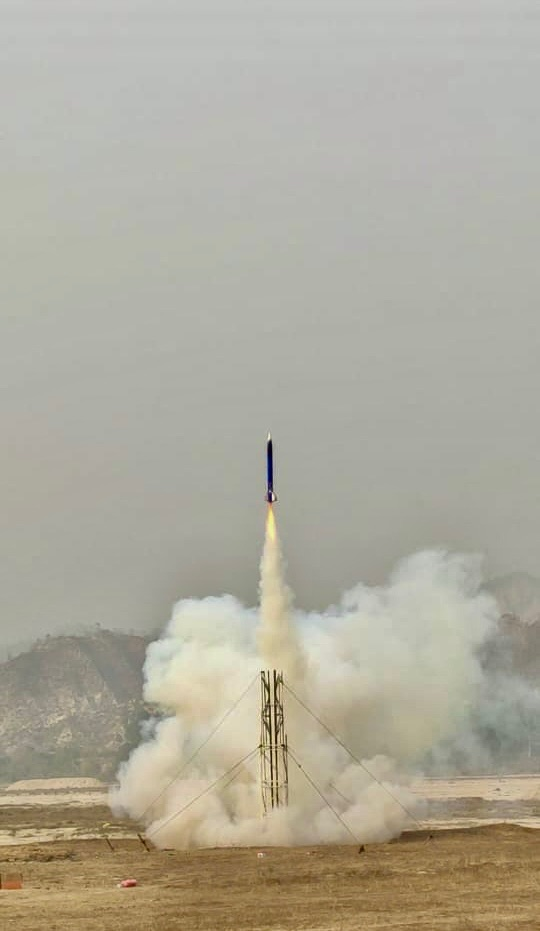
- Country of origin: Nepal

Size
- Height: 89 Inch
- Diameter: 6 Inch
- Mass: 22.6 kg
- Stages: Single Stage

Capacity

Launch history
- Total launches: 2
- Success(es): December 3, 2021
- First flight: March 20, 2021

GARUDA is a Nepalese sounding rocket. It is Nepal’s first rocket, designed and built by a team of Nepalese university students to compete in the Spaceport America Cup — the world’s largest student rocketry competition in 2021. This rocket was designed to reach 10,000 ft apogee carrying an experimental payload, marking as a foundational milestone in Nepal’s aerospace and rocket engineering history. The project brought together a team of engineers and undergrad students from several universities across Nepal. Participants were divided into specialized subsystems, allowing team members to gain hands-on experience with industry-standard aerospace practices.

== Background ==
The Garuda rocket project was initiated in 2020 by Mohan Tamang, then president of SEDS-Nepal, a student-led organization dedicated to promoting space education and engineering in Nepal. The project brought together 30+ students from multiple universities and disciplines to design, fabricate, test, and launch a high-power sounding rocket. Garuda was conceived not only as a competitive entry for the Spaceport America Cup 2021, but also as a national milestone to demonstrate Nepal’s emerging capabilities in space technology. By undertaking this ambitious project, the team aimed to inspire future generations of Nepali engineers and to lay the groundwork for private and academic aerospace initiatives in Nepal. The project also provided a unique opportunity to showcase Nepal on an international stage, fostering collaboration and knowledge exchange with global student rocketry teams.

== Design and development ==
Garuda is a single-stage solid-fuel rocket designed to reach an apogee of approximately 10,000 feet (about 3 km) and carrying a 2U CubeSat payload for experimental purposes. Its structure consists of a glass fiber body tube reinforced with multiple layers and a glass fiber nose cone, with four fins providing aerodynamic stability during ascent. The rocket’s primary propulsion system utilized a sugar based solid rocket motor researched and developed by students itself, delivering an average thrust of roughly 2,400 N over a burn time of 3.2 seconds, resulting in a simulated maximum velocity of 1,021 ft/s and acceleration of 11.8 g. The design also included a dual-parachute recovery system, with a drogue parachute deployed at apogee and a main parachute ensuring soft landing of the payload. The avionics subsystem of Garuda consisted of a 900 MHz RF telemetry system, capable of transmitting real-time altitude, velocity, and flight health data to the ground station for monitoring and analysis. The project involved a multidisciplinary team of 30+ students from seven universities, working across propulsion, avionics, and structure/recovery subsystems.

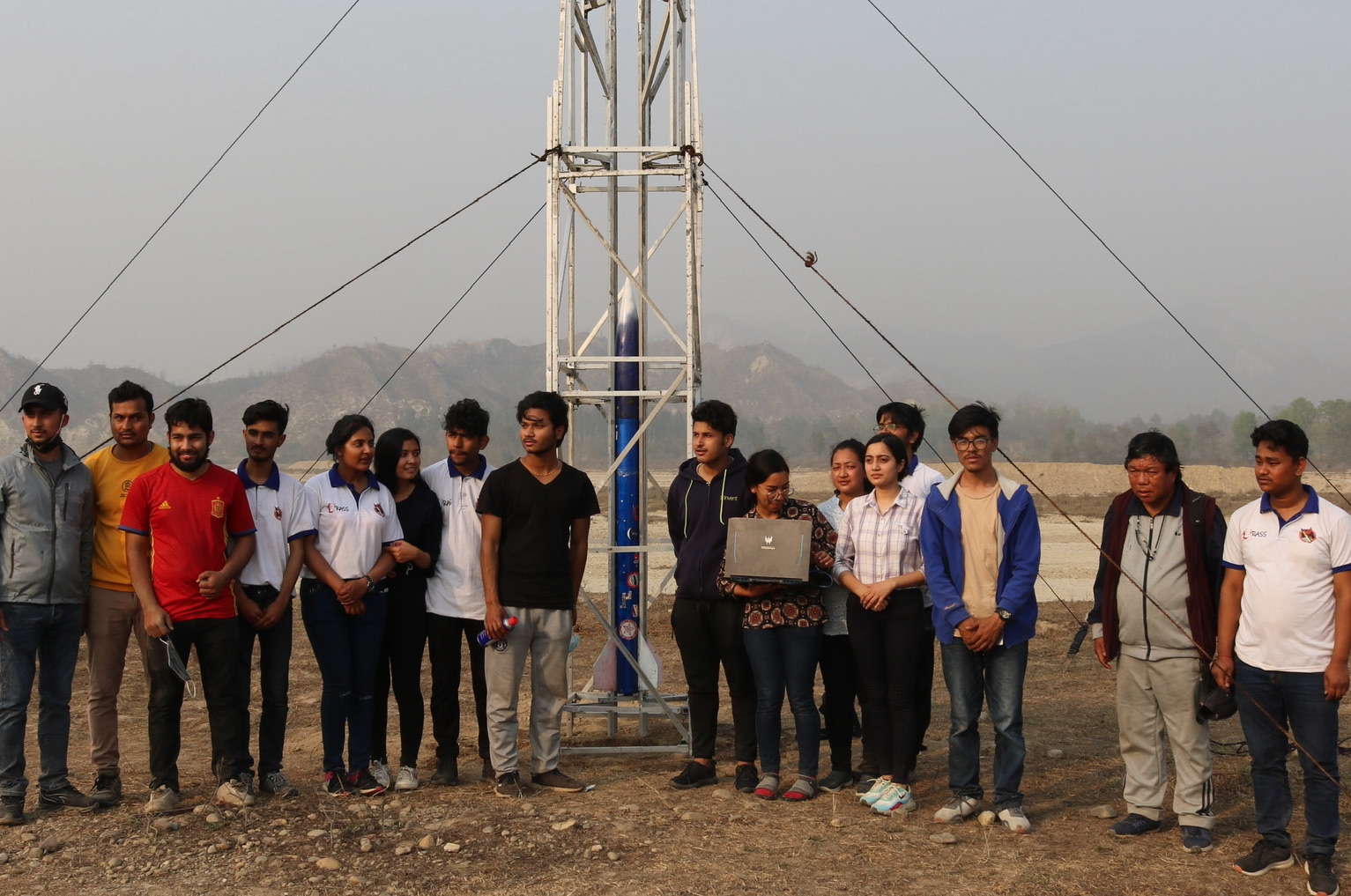
Team picture before launch

== Launch and mission ==
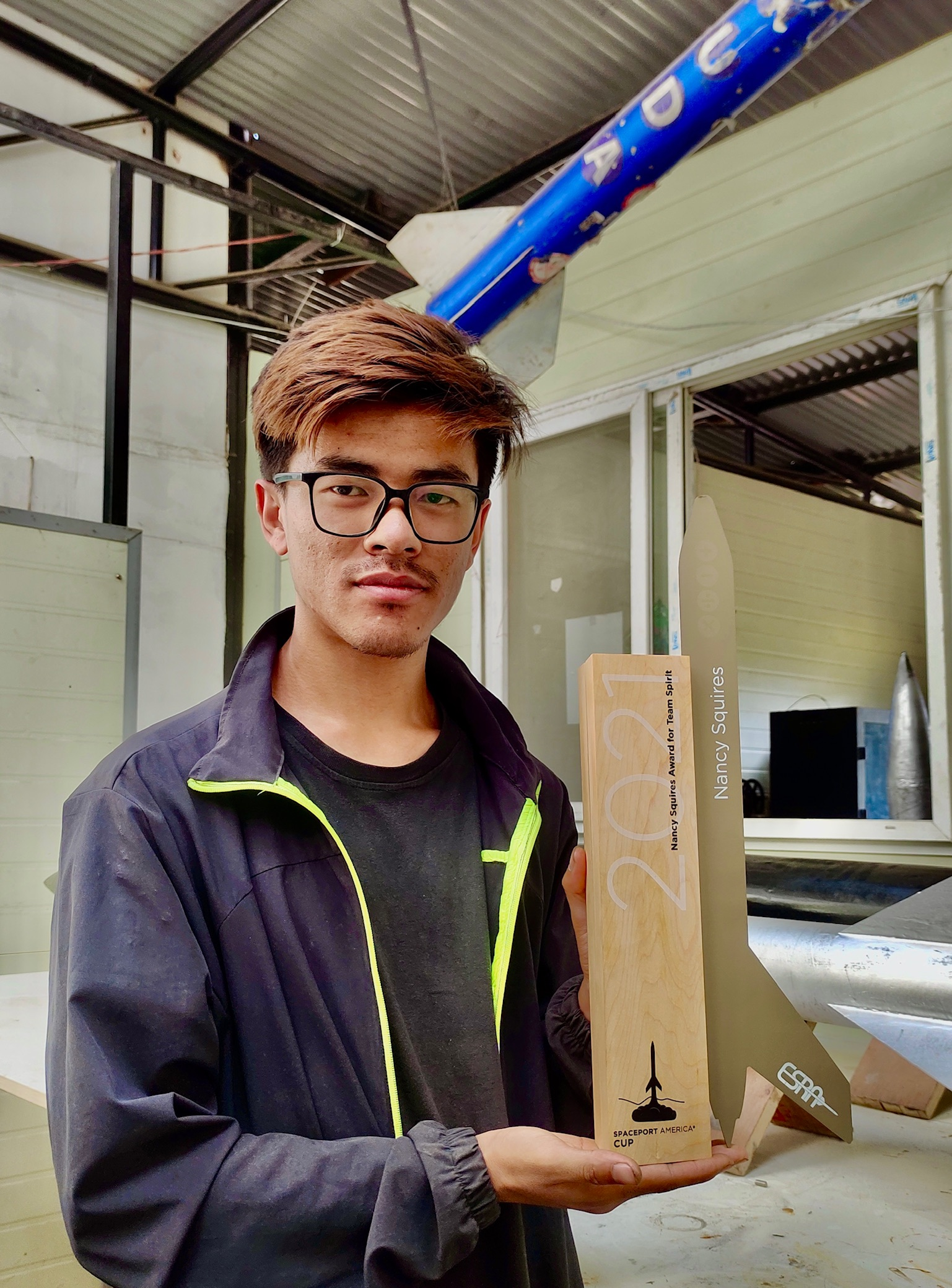
Project lead Mohan Tamang with Award from Spaceport America Cup

The Garuda rocket was intended to be launched at Spaceport America, New Mexico, USA, as part of the Spaceport America Cup 2021. While early reports noted technical challenges during test phases and some on-site efforts, Garuda represented a historic attempt by Nepalese engineers on an international stage, showcasing Nepal’s emerging capabilities in high-power rocketry but they could not travel to the US due to COVID-19. However they managed to do the historic launch of Nepal's first rocket in Janakpur, Dhanusha. The test launch did not go as planned, it crashed shortly after it took off. Later 2nd upgraded version GARUDA II was successfully launched on December 3, 2021 achieving 10km Apogee.

=== Achievements and impact ===
- International Recognition: The team won the Nancy Squires Team Spirit Award at the Spaceport America Cup 2021.
- Inspiration for Nepal’s Space Sector: Garuda’s development helped catalyze interest in aerospace in Nepal and laid groundwork for future initiatives in rocket development.

== Legacy ==
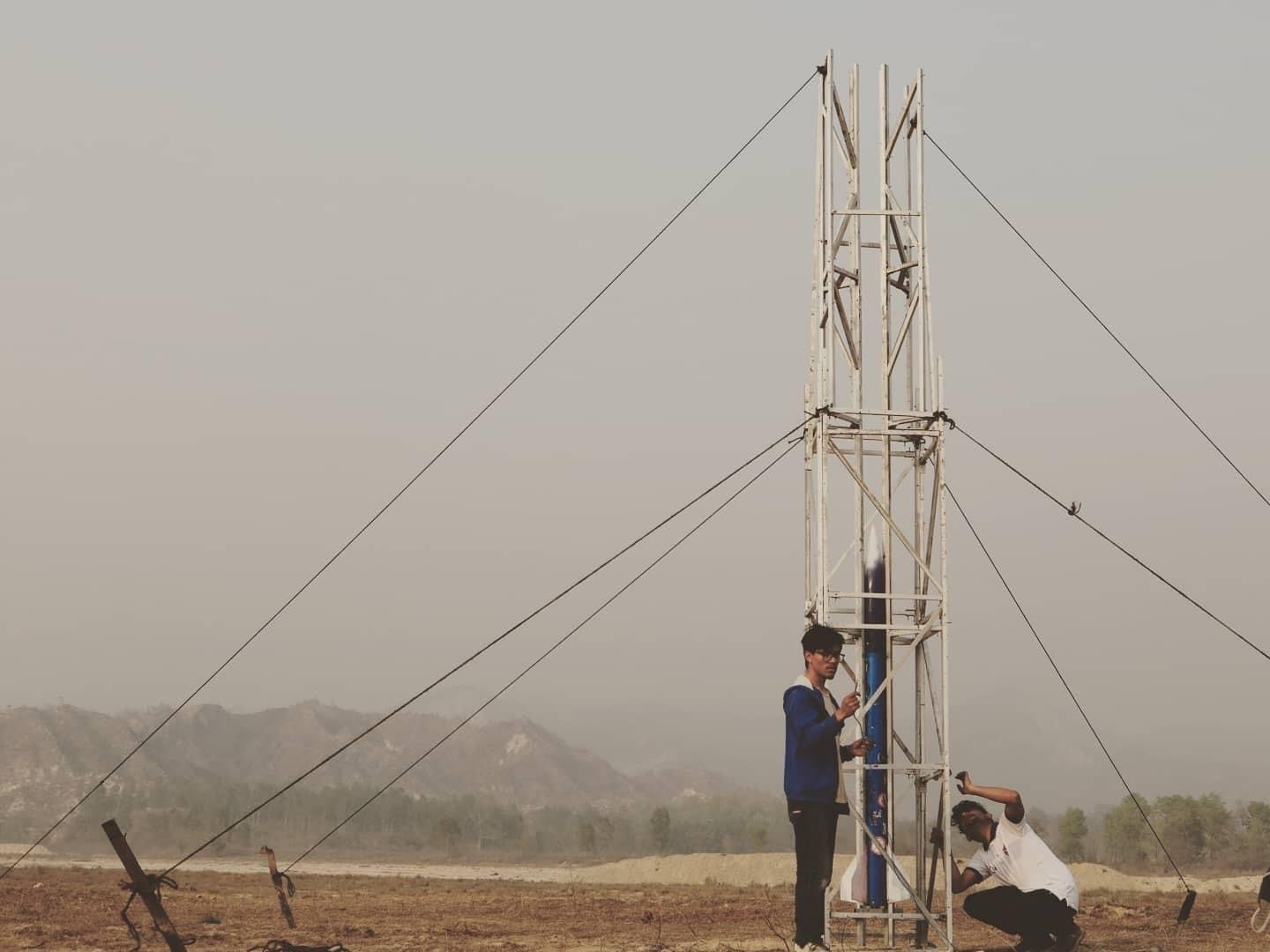
Final checks before rocket launch

Key Details
Launch Date	March 20, 2021
Test Site	Viman, Dhanusha
Project Lead	Mohan Tamang

Garuda is widely regarded in Nepali aerospace circles as the starting point of homegrown rocket engineering. It inspired subsequent projects and contributed to the founding of private aerospace ventures such as Mach24 Orbitals, which continue to advance rocket technology and launch capabilities in Nepal

== Reception ==
Prime minister of Nepal Khadga Prasad Oli congratulated the young engineers and institutions that were involved right from the development to its launching. Then Army Chief Purna Chandra Thapa and Ramon Magasaysay Award Winner Dr. Mahabir Pun was present personally at the launching site to congratulate and witness this historic launch.

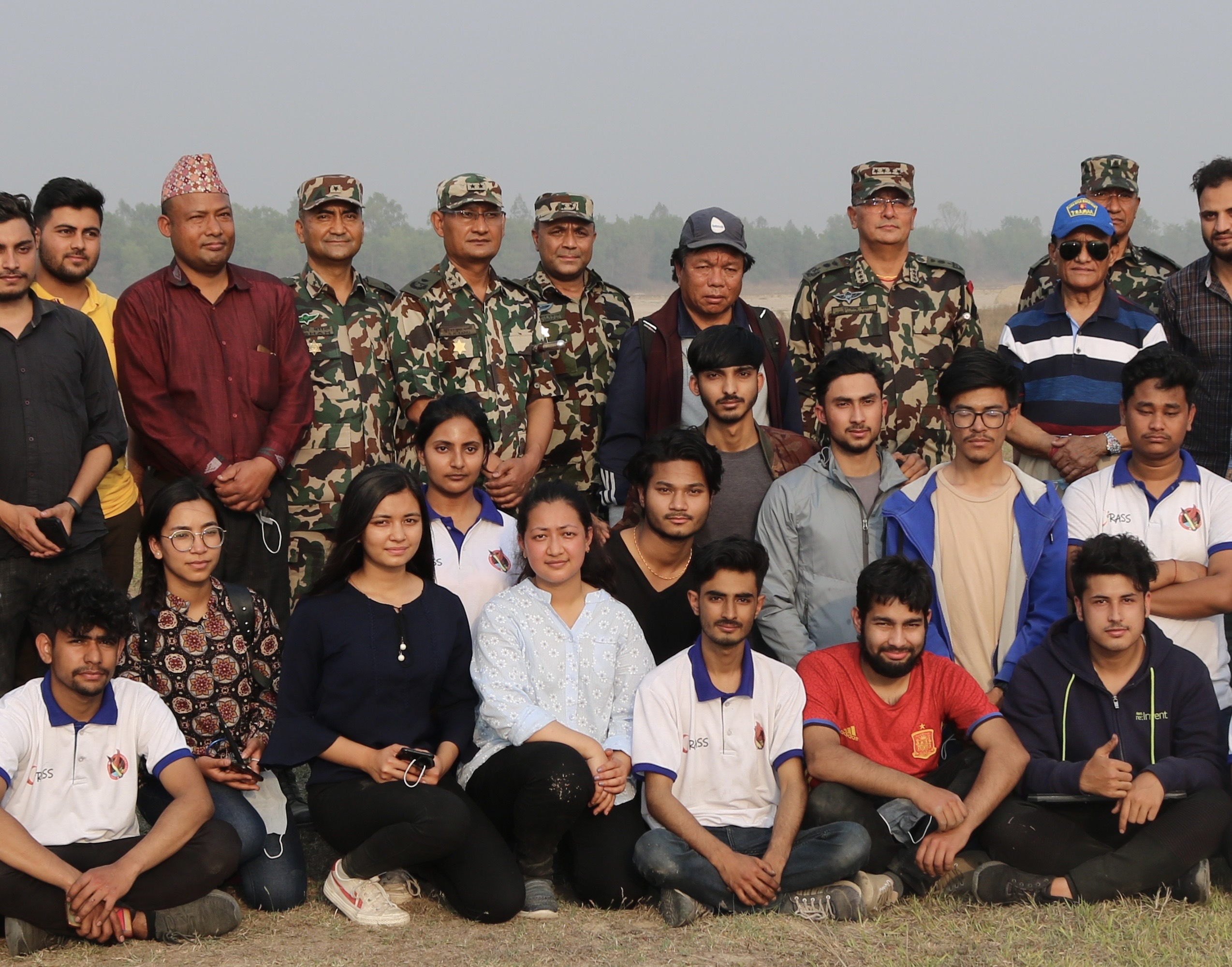
Team picture with Nepali Army chief and Dr. Mahabir pun
