= Worldview Broadcasting Channel =

Malaysian television channel

- Country: Malaysia
- Broadcast area: Klang Valley and Selangor

Programming
- Languages: Malay; Indonesian; English; Arabic; Persian
- Picture format: SDTV (480i 4:3); PAL (576i 4:3); DVB-T (Digital UHF); HDTV (1080i 16:9)

Ownership
- Owner: Worldview Broadcasting Channel (M) Sdn Bhd

History
- Launched: 1 April 2012
- Closed: October 2012

Links
- Website: wbcchannel.tv (inactive)

Worldwide Broadcasting Channel was a free-to-air news channel operated by Worldview Broadcasting Channel (M) Sdn Bhd. The channel was officially launched on 1 April 2012. However, in October 2012, it ceased transmission due to financial difficulties.

Test transmissions began on 1 December 2011, and it could typically be tuned on UHF 39 (615.25 MHz) in the Klang Valley and Selangor. Its test transmission time was from 6 p.m. to 12 a.m., broadcasting from its headquarters in the Petronas Twin Towers at Jalan Ampang, Kuala Lumpur. The channel began test broadcasting on 1 January 2012, was soft-launched on Thursday, 1 March 2012, and officially began broadcasting on 1 April 2012. WBC broadcast for six hours daily from 18:00 to 00:00 MST, via UHF Channel 39, with video frequency on 615.250 MHz and audio frequency on 620.750 MHz from Gunung Ulu Kali. The transmission had a power output of 20 kilowatts, with the antenna raised at 300 metres.

On 1 March 2012, TV3 news was aired live from Bandar Utama, Damansara, Petaling Jaya, Selangor on WBC daily from 20:00 to 21:00 MST. On 2 April 2012, WBC partnered with the Kuala Lumpur Stock Exchange (KLSE) to create a programme called "Bisnes Kuala Lumpur (Kuala Lumpur Business)," a business and financial news show. Malay newspapers carried the television schedule listings as the channel was officially launched on 1 April 2012.

== History ==
WBC was established on 1 October 2011 as a privately owned commercial company. It first aired on 1 November 2011, with limited broadcast airtime, covering only the Klang Valley area. Initially, technical broadcasts lasted only a few hours per day, mainly featuring Indonesian music. The broadcast coverage area included Klang Valley and Selangor.

WBC began test broadcasts on 1 January 2012, airing mostly Indonesian music videos from 18:00 to 20:00 MST daily. It was soft-launched on 1 March 2012, broadcasting from 18:00 to 21:00 MST daily. This occurred one day before the official metropolitan broadcast for the Klang Valley area on Channel 39, using a video frequency of 615.250 MHz and an audio frequency of 620.750 MHz via UHF. The television transmitter was located at Menara TV3 in the Bukit Sungai Besi complex. From 1 March to 31 March 2012, WBC aired two programmes—news relays and movie premieres.

WBC was officially launched by Toni Braxton, accompanied by Ecstasia Sanders and Agam Darshi, on 1 April 2012 at 21:00 MST. The "Grand Launching" event, broadcast live from the Petronas Twin Towers, marked the channel's grand opening as a free-to-air terrestrial channel in Kuala Lumpur. During the event, the signature inscription and button press on the video camera symbolized the start of longer broadcast hours, with transmissions extending from 18:00 to 00:00 MST daily. The channel aired in the Klang Valley on Channel 39, featuring a full programme lineup, including dramas, music videos, news bulletins, blockbuster movie premieres, and current affairs. However, the channel was short-lived, ceasing operation in October 2012 on account of financial difficulties.
