= RTB Sukmaindera =

Television network in Brunei

- Country: Brunei
- Broadcast area: Worldwide
- Headquarters: Secretariat Building, Jalan Elizabeth II, Bandar Seri Begawan, Brunei-Muara District, Brunei BS8610

Programming
- Languages: Malay; English
- Picture format: 1080i (16:9/HDTV)

Ownership
- Owner: Radio Television Brunei
- Sister channels: RTB Perdana; RTB Aneka

History
- Launched: 9 July 2003; 23 years ago
- Former names: RTB International (9 July 2003-2009); RTB4 International (2009-10 April 2017)

Links
- Website: www.rtb.gov.bn

Availability

Terrestrial
- (Malaysia) MYTV: Channel 857 (HD)

Streaming media
- RTBGo: Watch live

RTB Sukmaindera (Jawi: سوكمايندرا RTB) (formerly known as RTB4 International and RTB International, stylised as RTB SUKMAINDERA) is a 24-hour free-to-air television channel in Brunei owned by Radio Television Brunei (RTB), the country's state broadcaster. The channel officially began broadcasting on 9 July 2003, a pilot service had existed since 1994.

The channel shows Malay and English dramas, animated programmes, documentaries, movies and various other programmes, both local and international and simulcast news slots from sister channel RTB Perdana.

== History ==
RTB announced the beginning of a one-hour satellite slot using the Indonesian Palapa B2P satellite on 24 December 1993. The service, named RTB International, was set to start on 1 January 1994. The primary target audience was Bruneians in the Malay archipelago, delivering news, current affairs programmes and documentaries produced by RTB.

The channel's satellite signal was discontinued on 28 February 2017.

On 11 April 2017, RTB4 was renamed as RTB Sukmaindera as part of RTB's rebranding project as well as broadcaster's shift from analogue into digital broadcasting.
