= Garuda TV =

Defunct Dutch television channel

- Country: Netherlands

Programming
- Language: Indonesian
- Picture format: 4:3 SDTV

History
- Launched: December 2005; 20 years ago
- Closed: December 2009

Garuda TV was a Dutch cable television channel aimed primarily at Indonesian and Dutch East Indies immigrants. It was a subscription channel, part of a digital package. Garuda TV's parent company was GTV, based in Jakarta, Indonesia, unrelated to the Indonesian television channel of the same name.

== History ==
In late 2004, the company was established with a tentative early 2005 launch date. The channel was owned by PT Altra Excis Investama (AXIS Group) who owned 100% of the channel, and its subsidiary PT Cipta Indah Strategi. The target audience was made up of Dutch people of Indonesian descent, as well as ethnic Java/Surinamese Dutch and people with active interest in Indonesia who were living in Europe. It procured rights for programs from the main Indonesian channels.

The channel was formally announced in late October 2005, with Casema and Multikabel the first companies to carry it. Experimental broadcasts started in December 2005, becoming regular on 15 January 2006.

By 2009, the channel was in limbo, carrying mainly repeats. Facing this situation, the channel ceased operations gradually during December that year.
