= Secretariat Building, Brunei =

Historical building in Brunei

Secretariat Building
- Bangunan Sekretariat
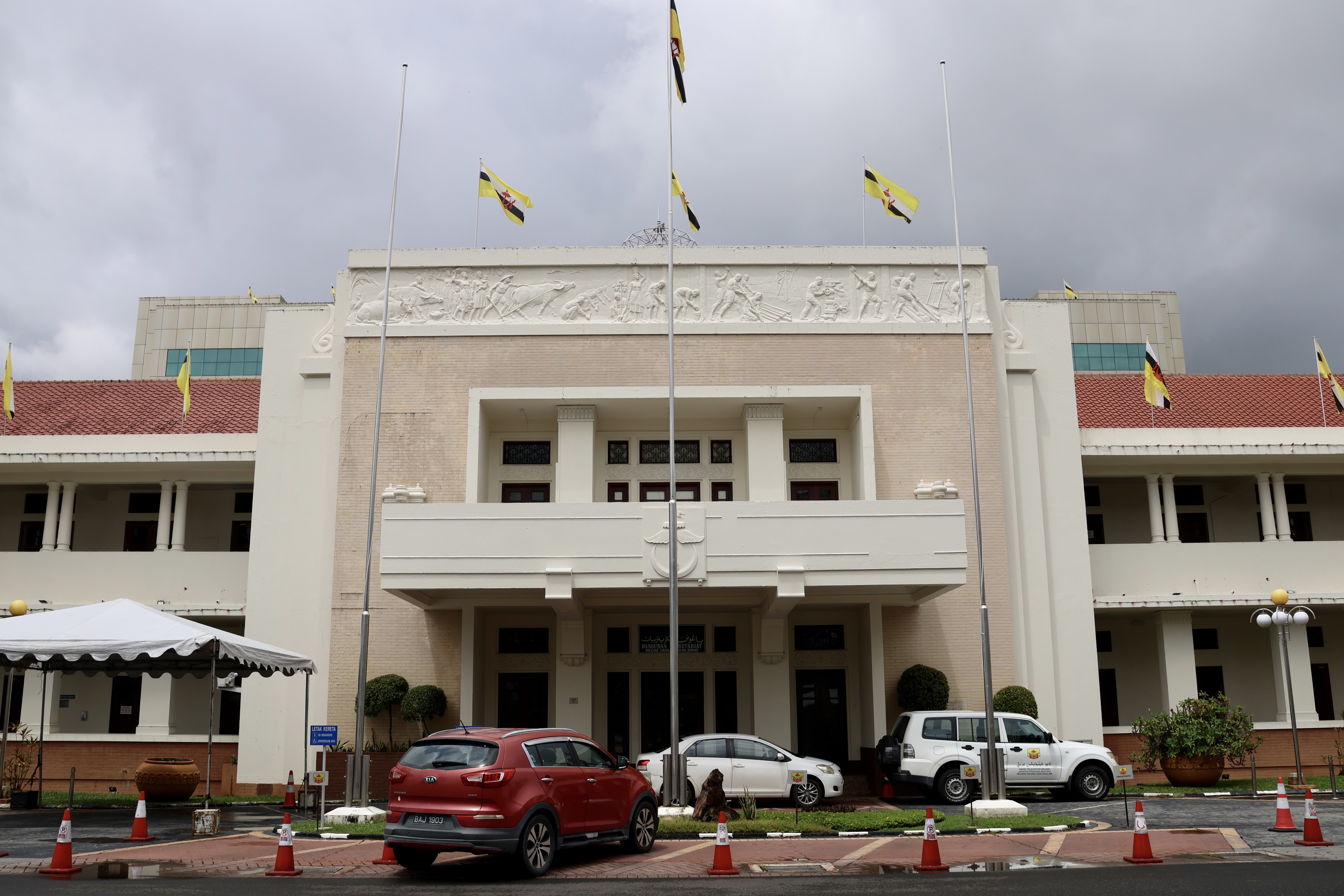
- Secretariat Building in 2023
- Interactive map of the Secretariat Building area
- Former names: Brunei Government Offices
- Alternative names: Government Secretariat Building; RTB Headquarters

General information
- Type: Office
- Architectural style: Constructivist architecture
- Location: Jalan Elizabeth II, Bandar Seri Begawan, Brunei
- Coordinates: 4.89064°N 114.94173°E
- Current tenants: Radio Television Brunei
- Construction started: 19 November 1952
- Completed: August 1953
- Opened: 1 July 1954

Technical details
- Material: concrete

Design and construction
- Architect: Rudolfo Nolli
- Architecture firm: Booty and Edwards Architecture

Other information
- Parking: On site (no charge)

The Secretariat Building (Malay: Bangunan Sekretariat) or formerly known as the Brunei Government Offices and Government Secretariat Building (Bangunan Setiausaha Kerajaan) is the oldest government structure that serves the State Secretariat of Brunei or the seat of government. The building is located at Jalan Elizabeth II, Bandar Seri Begawan, Brunei-Muara District, Brunei. The building is currently under the protection of the Antiquities and Treasure Trove Act of the Museums Department.

== History ==
Following the completion of the design and layout plans in the first part of the previous year. Sultan Omar Ali Saifuddien III set the foundation stone on 19 November 1952, and it was finished in August 1953, completely furnished in the style of classic concrete colonial architecture. The Brunei Government Offices was regarded as Brunei's most contemporary structure at the time it was constructed. At the beginning of its establishment on 1 July 1954, the Jabatan Adat Istiadat Negara of the Prime Minister's Office (PMO) was located in the General Office of the building.

It served as Brunei government's administrative hub after the 1959 promulgation of the Brunei Constitution. Before being placed under the Prime Minister's Office's (PMO) control, the Public Works Department was in charge of all government buildings in the country. After the Supreme Court's establishment in 1963, it has previously used portion of Secretariat Building as their main building. Birthday of Queen Elizabeth on 8 June 1968, was honoured with a ceremonial procession in front of the building in Brunei Town.

As soon as Brunei attained complete independence in 1984, the Ministry of Communications was founded in the Secretariat Building, before its relocation to the Brunei Telecom Department Building at the Old Airport, Berakas. Radio Television Brunei's (RTB) have relocated to its new headquarters to the building on 15 June 2020.

== Design and construction ==
The Secretariat Building's façade hasn't altered much since it was first constructed. The building's original brick-red roofs, white body, and fair-faced external accent walls. The building appears to be shaped like the capital letter "E" from above. This is thought to be a tribute to Queen Elizabeth II, representing both the colonial architectural style and the period of time when it was built under the British Residency. The symmetrical architecture and mirrored floor plan of the structure were designed by Booty and Edwards Architecture. It has a face-brick pattern on the front and on the concrete porch of the building.

Its colonnaded front verandah, which is decorated with Brunei emblem, and its three pylon entrances combine traditional British and minimalist Egyptian architectural feature. The primary entry to the structure is the somewhat bigger center entrance. Along the passage between the pylons are similar doors surrounded by white stucco, light brickwork, and five pillars. The double timber doors with black glass allow for ventilation when there are no windows. Each pylon's parapet facing Taman Sir Omar 'Ali Saifuddien is adorned with relief sculptures that represent historical and indigenous scenes from Brunei. The Italian sculptor Rudolfo Nolli created these carvings that depict customary Bruneian pursuits including farming, metalworking, and fabric weaving, summarizing the locals' means of subsistence.

== See also ==
- Politics of Brunei
- Bandar Seri Begawan
