= Rangkaian Ketiga =

Television channel in Sabah and Sarawak, Malaysia

- Country: Malaysia
- Broadcast area: Sabah and Sarawak
- Headquarters: Kota Kinabalu, Sabah, Malaysia

Programming
- Language: Malay

Ownership
- Owner: Radio Televisyen Malaysia
- Sister channels: RTM1

History
- Launched: 30 December 1971; 54 years ago
- Founder: Government of Sabah
- Closed: 1 August 1985; 41 years ago
- Replaced by: RTM2
- Former names: Televisyen Sabah (1971 – 1975)

Availability

Terrestrial
- VHF: Channel 10 (Pantai Barat); Channel 9 (Kudat, Tawau, Pedalaman); Channel 8 (Sandakan); Channel 7 (Lahad Datu, Semporna)

Rangkaian Ketiga (Network Three) was a Malaysian television station for Sabah and Sarawak, operating out of Kota Kinabalu. It started in 1970 as a television station owned by the government of Sabah, before being acquired by Radio Televisyen Malaysia in 1975. The introduction and coverage reach expansion of RTM2 into these two states led to its dissolution in 1985.

== History ==
=== Setup ===
The possibility of introducing television to the two states first emerged on 12 October 1964, where a plan to install television stations in Jesselton (Kota Kinabalu) and Sandakan was approved by the House of Representatives. The plan cost a total of $9 million, of which $3.5 million were spent for an initial phase covering only the state capital of Jesselton, and the remaining $5.5 million were for a second phase where the signal would be extended to the entire state.

In 1965 TV Malaysia announced a plan for the introduction of television there between 1966 and 1970, the period covered by the First Malaysia Plan, after achieving total coverage in West Malaysia, where coverage to the east coast was expected to be introduced by the end of 1965. On 13 July 1966, the state of Sabah approved plans for the extension of the television service to Jesselton and Sandakan, with assistance from Kuala Lumpur. A site for the television station was yet to be studied. In July 1968, it was calculated that the new station would take $3 million to build. Following the purchase of the land to build the station, it was projected that it would be on the air by June 1969. By January 1969, it was expected that the television station for Sabah would start only in 1970, at a cost of $10 million, where it would be run as an independent operation from the Kuala Lumpur network, producing its own programmes. There was no talk yet of a television station for Sarawak.

In April 1970, it was announced that Sabah TV would only start in 1971. It was expected that a pilot service would begin in August in the state's west coast, before starting a full service covering every kampong and district the following year. It was expected by June that the launch of the service would take place only at the end of 1971.

Equipment from the British company EMI arrived in November 1970, in a contract worth $6.4 million, awarded by Talivishen Malaysia. A tentative December 1971 launch date was announced, alongside a telephone system by February 1972. At the end of December, an airlift operation for heavy equipment atop Mount Kinabalu (where the main transmitter was located) began, using a Royal Malaysian Air Force (RMAF) Nuri helicopter for the purpose.

Test transmissions started on 21 December 1970, with limited programming. In February 1971, it was reported that these signals were being picked up in some parts of Brunei (whose television station would not start until 1975), causing confusion from locals, some of whom believed to be a hoax. On 29 November, it was announced that the service would launch on 28 December 1971. With the launch, Televisyen Sabah was now broadcasting five hours a day (a total of 35 hours a week), consisting mainly of imported films, local documentaries, children's programmes, local songs (mostly in Dusunic languages) as well as promotion of local talents, for the promotion of both the local ethnic groups and the tourist industry. In January 1972, it was announced that the station, alongside its radio counterpart, would introduce advertising, under the condition that all commercials would be in the Malay language.

=== Acquisition by RTM and closure ===
In March 1975, it was announced that satellite connections would be installed in August in Kuantan and Kota Kinabalu, the capitals of the two Borneo states. This enabled RTM1 to be broadcast across all of Malaysia. Consequently, Radio Televisyen Malaysia bought the television station from the Sabah government and added Sarawak to its coverage area.

Network Three started broadcasting in colour in 1980. The colour broadcast aired a restricted number of imports seen in Peninsular Malaysia. Imports shown on Network Two were often skipped, limiting to the ones seen on Network One. The service aired an uncensored version of The Monte Carlo Show in 1981, which ended up having cuts on Network One.

When Malaysia unified its timezone on 1 January 1982, the airtime of the channel was reduced from two hours (6pm to 8pm) to just 45 minutes (6:10pm to 6:55pm). The news bulletin, which aired at 7:40pm, was moved to 6:40pm. In order to ramp up collaborations between both sides of Malaysia, more Sabah programmes would be seen on the Kuala Lumpur networks. The only non-news programmes were limited to Intisari (Sabah) and Rampai Kenyalang (Sarawak). The move received criticism because the prior two-hour slot aired cartoons and foreign series, and that programming aimed at children aired at an earlier slot, much to the dissatisfaction of the target audience.

In May 1982, RTM announced that TV2 would start broadcasting in Sabah and Sarawak from 31 August 1983. The Rangkaian Ketiga network was used to rebroadcast TV2 from that date, causing local programming to be reduced (airing only one hour a day as of December 1984), before finishing in 1985. On 16 December 1984, the Sabah State Government appealed to the federal government, telling RTM to delay the decision to close the network. Without the network, relations between the ethnic people of the two states would not be closer, due to the poor communication facilities at the time. It was proposed that TV2 would air a substitute news bulletin for the region in place of the Tamil bulletin shown in West Malaysia, and that more programmes from the two states should be seen on the two national networks.

Rangkaian Ketiga ceased broadcasting on 1 August 1985, with RTM2 took over its broadcast expansion in East Malaysia. Since the channel's closure, the Sabah centre of RTM has not produced its own television programmes, limiting instead to the rebroadcast of the national networks from Kuala Lumpur.

RTM planned to relaunch the East Malaysia channel with the introduction of digital terrestrial television, but the plan was scrapped in favour of TV Okey. The concept was later given to a private company called the Sarawak Media Group (SMG) to establish the basis of what would become TV Sarawak.

== See also ==
- Radio Televisyen Malaysia
- TV Okey
- TV Sarawak
