= RTB Perdana =

Television network in Brunei

- Country: Brunei
- Broadcast area: National; also available in Malaysia (northern part of state of Sarawak and the island territory of Labuan)
- Headquarters: Secretariat Building, Jalan Elizabeth II, Bandar Seri Begawan, Brunei-Muara District, Brunei BS8610

Programming
- Languages: Malay; English; Indonesian
- Picture format: 1080i (16:9/HDTV)

Ownership
- Owner: Radio Television Brunei
- Sister channels: RTB Aneka; RTB Sukmaindera

History
- Launched: 1 March 1975; 51 years ago
- Former names: TV Brunei (1975-1984); RTB (1984-2006); RTB1 (2006-2017)

Links
- Website: www.rtb.gov.bn

Availability

Terrestrial
- (Malaysia) MYTV: Channel 855 (HD)

RTB Perdana (formerly known as Television Brunei, Television Brunei RTB and RTB1, stylised as RTB perdana) is the oldest free-to-air terrestrial television channel in Brunei. The channel officially began broadcasting on 1 March 1975.

RTB Perdana broadcasts for 05:40 until 23:20 BST followed by a prayer in Makkah filling the rest of its broadcasting time. It mainly shows documentaries, educational programs and news during its broadcasting time.

== History ==
Brunei was first scheduled to have long-term plans for a television service as far back as 1964, when a representant of the Marconi Company had visited Brunei early that year, carried a geographic survey and sent a report to the government. The 1965 report made by Canadian firm Pappas and Associates claimed that there were no technical issues, and the final decision was up to the Sultan, who had seen television in trips abroad. Ground work for the new service would cost $3 million, $10 million for the final total. The main issue was the lack of technical staff to sustain the service. The Sultan believed to have mentioned the issue in what was at the time his latest trip to the UK.

These plans were later delayed to 1969, towards the end of the first lapse of time given during the first study regarding the feasibility of a television service. If introduced, the service would be used for "religious, cultural, educational and entertainment purposes". A commercial service was out of the cards. The plan was aborted on 31 March 1968, in order to cut the Bruneian expenditure. Among the reasons given were the lack of producing local programming.

When Televisyen Sabah started conducting test transmissions in February 1971, Bruneians claimed to have picked up the Malaysian signals, but some viewers questioned if it was a hoax. Once the test transmissions were over, shops started selling television sets under the counter under the risk of having problems with the authorities. A "TV fever" had begun. When Brunei was about to witness a five-year economic boom, there was the possibility of launching a television service. By 1973, 3,000 television sets existed in Brunei. It was later decided in October 1974 that the service would broadcast in colour.

Yusof Ahmad, a former Malay programmes editor at RTS, was granted a job at RTB for the then-upcoming colour television service. Ahead of the launch of the service, many Singaporean technicians were working at RTB, providing assistance for its colour service.

RTB's television service launched on 1 March 1975; the network did a first test on 1–2 March. The first phase of the pilot service launched on 10 July 1975, costing B$30 million. BBC and RTS executives assisted in its launch. RTB's television service was initially receivable only in Bandar Seri Begawan. A second transmitter to cover the rest of the protectorate was to be included in a second phase. Before the arrival of TV2 to Sabah and Sarawak, viewers near the border picked up RTB's signals with adapted aerials. By 1978, it had been attracting RTS technicians from Singapore under the grounds of having better salaries. RTB used two transmitters to air its signal, starting with channel 5 in Bandar Seri Begawan, and from 1976; it was joined by the second transmitter at Seria on channel 8. The lack of preparation for its launch implied that TV Brunei, as it was then called, to open with a skeleton staff; most other jobs at the station had to be filled in by overseas trainees.

The five-year project for television was divided in two phases:

- Phase 1 - part of the radio studios were used for television.
- Phase 2 - utilising the current multi-purpose studio complex which was fully commissioned by 1980.

Facing lack of expertise ahead of the 1985 SEA Games, RTB employed staff from the Singapore Broadcasting Corporation in December 1983 to provide technical assistance. Days ahead of the start of the Games, Intelsat did not provide sufficient airtime to Singapore, meaning that Singapore, the only country that negotiated live satellite broadcasts, was unable to carry the opening ceremony live.

In December 1985, RTB approved a change to the dressing style of the news presenters, with female presenters appearing without headgear. Continuity announcers were also affected.

On 11 April 2017, RTB1 along with sister channel RTB5 officially merged and renamed RTB Perdana as part of RTB's rebranding project as well as broadcaster's shift from analogue into digital broadcasting.
