= RTB Aneka =

Television network in Brunei

- Country: Brunei
- Broadcast area: National; also available in Malaysia (northern part of state of Sarawak and the island territory of Labuan)
- Headquarters: Secretariat Building, Jalan Elizabeth II, Bandar Seri Begawan, Brunei-Muara District, Brunei BS8610

Programming
- Languages: Malay; English; Korean; Mandarin; Tagalog; Thai; Turkish
- Picture format: 1080i (16:9/HDTV)

Ownership
- Owner: Radio Television Brunei
- Sister channels: RTB Perdana; RTB Sukmaindera

History
- Launched: 23 February 2006; 20 years ago
- Former names: RTB2 (2006-2017)

Links
- Website: www.rtb.gov.bn

Availability

Terrestrial
- (Malaysia) MYTV: Channel 856 (HD)

RTB Aneka (formerly known as RTB2) is the second oldest free-to-air terrestrial television channel in Brunei. The channel officially began broadcasting on 23 February 2006.

RTB Aneka broadcasts for 07:40 until 00:00 BST followed by a Promo/AIDS/PSA filling the rest of its broadcasting time. RTB Aneka mainly shows entertainment and variety programs as well as news during its broadcasting time.

Before the merger, RTB2 mainly aired variety and drama content, while RTB3 broadcast a similar mix of programming in HD.

On 11 April 2017, RTB2 along with sister channel RTB3 HD officially merged and renamed RTB Aneka as part of RTB's rebranding project as well as broadcaster's shift from analogue into digital broadcasting.
