= Agila-1 =

First Filipino satellite

- Names: Palapa B2P (1987–1996); Agila-1 (1996–1998)
- Mission type: Communications
- Operator: PT Pasifik Satelit Nusantara (1987–1996); Mabuhay (1996–1998)
- COSPAR ID: 1987-029A
- SATCAT no.: 17706
- Mission duration: 10 years, 10 months

Spacecraft properties
- Spacecraft type: HS-376
- Manufacturer: Hughes
- Launch mass: 1,200 kg (2,600 lb)
- BOL mass: 692 kg (1,526 lb)

Start of mission
- Launch date: March 20, 1987, 22:22 UTC
- Rocket: Delta-3920 PAM-D; D-182
- Launch site: Cape Canaveral LC-17

End of mission
- Disposal: Decommissioned
- Last contact: January 1998

Orbital parameters
- Reference system: Geocentric
- Regime: GEO
- Semi-major axis: 42,265 km (26,262 mi)
- Perigee altitude: 35,882.9 km (22,296.6 mi)
- Apogee altitude: 35,905.5 km (22,310.6 mi)
- Inclination: 14.6°
- Period: 1,441.2 min
- Epoch: 31 March 2025, 12:08:51 UTC (JD 2460766.0061438)

Agila-1 or Mabuhay was launched on March 20, 1987, under the name Palapa B2-P in Cape Canaveral Air Force Station. It was originally under Indonesian company, PT Pasifik Satelit Nusantara until it was acquired by Philippine company, Mabuhay Satellite Corporation which is under PLDT in 1996. Upon its acquisition by Mabuhay, it became the first Philippine satellite through acquisition while in orbit. Palapa B2-P was later renamed to "Agila-1", the local name for the Philippine eagle. The satellite's operation ended in January 1998 and was decommissioned into a graveyard orbit above GEO.
