= Mass media in Brunei =

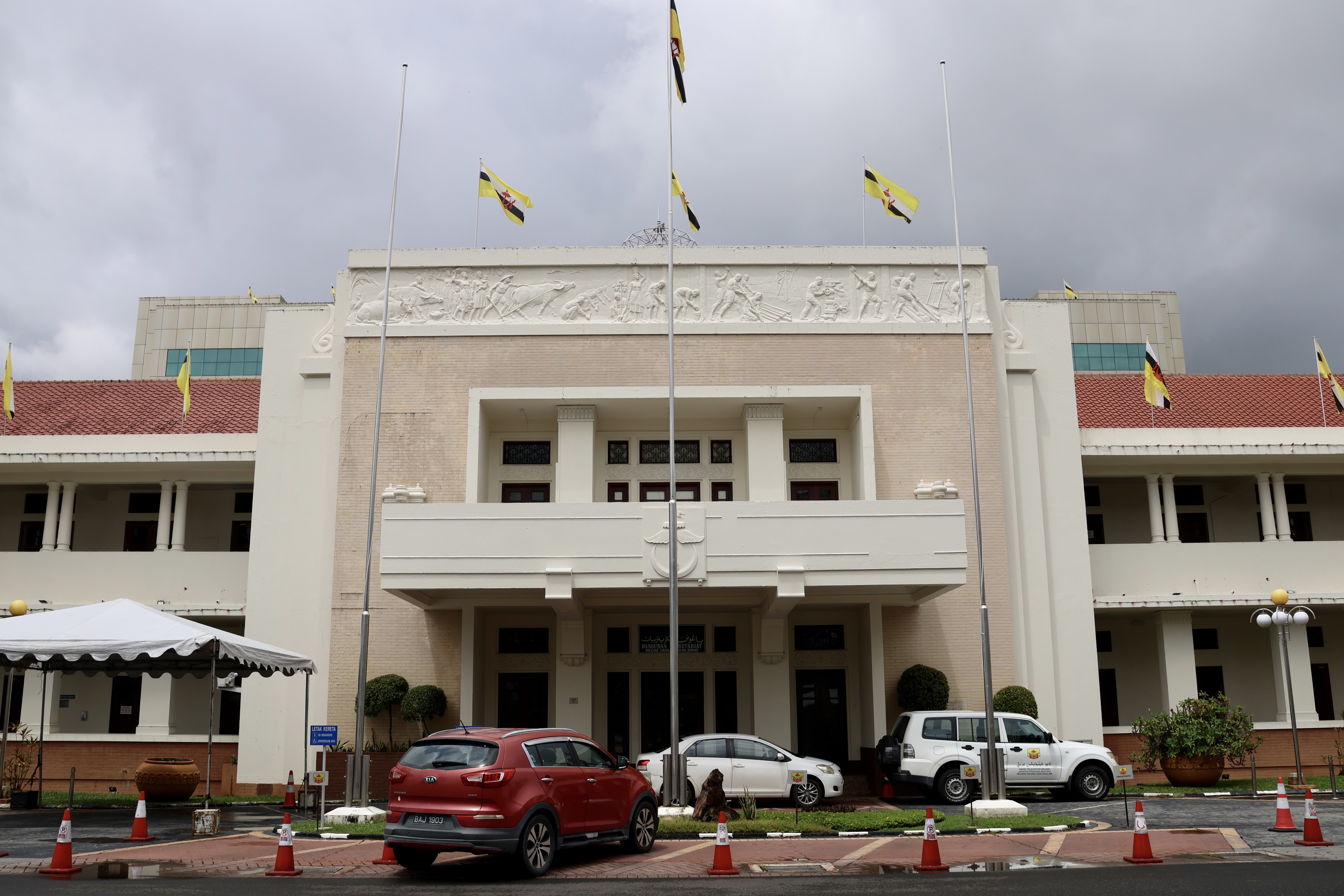
The headquarters of Radio Television Brunei at the Secretariat Building.

The mass media in Brunei are strictly controlled by the government under Sultan Hassanal Bolkiah, who has effectively maintained martial law in the country since the Brunei Revolt of 1962. News coverage is largely limited to police reports, lifestyle features, and community events, with minimal representation of diverse viewpoints. Reporters Without Borders states that there is "virtually no criticism of the government." Additionally, the liberal democracy watchdog Freedom House categorizes Brunei's media as "not free."

The privately owned Brunei Press Sdn Bhd, which publishes the Borneo Bulletin, is controlled by the Sultan's family. Reporters and editors practice self-censorship on political and religious issues.

A press law imposes prison sentences of up to three years for reporting "false news."

== History ==
The newspaper industry in Brunei began only after the 1950s. Before that, the only publication available in Brunei was the Annual Reports, published by the British Colonial Office. The first regular government publication was the Government Gazette, which was first issued in 1951. However, the Gazette was not strictly a newspaper but an official government publication.

The first newspaper to appear in Brunei was Salam Seria, published in 1952 by the British Malayan Petroleum Company, the predecessor of today's Brunei Shell Petroleum Company. As an official company publication, it provided news and information to both its staff and the general public, covering topics such as oil exploration and other company-related updates. Although it was produced bilingually in English and Malay, the Malay version included additional content, such as world news and educational materials. In 1953, Salam Seria was renamed Salam and has continued to be published to this day as a free publication.

The second newspaper, today's Borneo Bulletin, first appeared on 7 November 1953. This English weekly publication was printed in Kuala Belait by the Brunei Press Company, which was established in October 1953. Initially sold for 20 cents, the Borneo Bulletin focused primarily on news from Borneo, with a special emphasis on Brunei. Its first print run of approximately 3,500 copies was the largest in Borneo at the time.

In 1959, the founders of the Borneo Bulletin sold the press and the newspaper to the Straits Times of Singapore. Initially, the Bulletin featured different covers for its three editions, which were tailored for Brunei, Sabah, and Sarawak. Circulation rose to approximately 10,000 copies by 1957 but declined to around 6,000 by 1970 due to Sarawak and Sabah being incorporated into Malaysia. However, by 1983, production had increased to about 30,000 copies before gradually declining to approximately 10,000 by 1997.

In 1985, Brunei's first publicly listed company, QAF Brunei, acquired part of the shares of Brunei Press from the Straits Times. By September 1990, the Borneo Bulletin transitioned into a daily newspaper. Currently, its daily circulation averages 20,000 copies per issue, while the weekend and Sunday editions average 25,000 copies.

The third publication is the government-owned Pelita Brunei, first published on 15 February 1956. The inaugural issue featured a speech by His Majesty Sultan Haji Omar Ali Saifuddien Saadul Khairi Waddien to mark the launch of the newspaper.

In 1957, Pelita Brunei was published twice a month and initially produced on A4-sized paper. In 1959, the paper's size increased to 9 inches by 14 inches. It wasn't until July 1965 that Pelita Brunei became a weekly newspaper, published every Wednesday, and it has remained so ever since.

In the beginning, only about 1,000 copies of Pelita Brunei were printed. By the 1990s, weekly circulation had grown to over 45,000, making it the largest print publication in the country. The newspaper's content expanded from approximately 4 pages to about 24 pages today, with a second section added that includes government job vacancies, awarded tenders, and other interesting features and articles.

A fourth publication, Berita Brunei, was a short-lived newspaper first published in March 1957. It was printed in Malay, partly in Jawi, and was a weekly publication, released every Thursday. It sold for about 10 cents per copy, with a print run of approximately 5,000. By July 1958, the Jawi script was dropped, and in October 1959, the newspaper was renamed Berita Borneo. However, the newly renamed Berita Borneo lasted only five editions, with the final issue published in December 1958. The editor cited a drop in advertisements from Malaysia and Singapore as the main reason for its closure.

In April 1958, another publication in Jawi, called Malaysia, was launched by the Budaya Press. Sold for about 20 cents per copy, it ceased publication by September 1958.

Suara Bakti, a publication by a former political party, was launched in October 1961 as the sixth newspaper in Brunei. It was published every Friday and dubbed itself "the largest weekly newspaper in North Kalimantan," selling for 20 cents per copy. However, the newspaper was released sporadically, and by December 1961, it had only about 10 editions. A new editor took over, but the publication lasted for only about 5 more editions before closing down in January 1962.

The seventh publication, Bintang Harian and The Daily Star, was first published in March 1966 in both Malay and English. It was released every day except Sunday and sold for about 15 cents. More than 10,000 copies were printed daily, as it was distributed not only in Brunei but also in Sabah, Sarawak, West Malaysia, and Singapore. When it ceased publication in January 1971, circulation had increased to more than 15,000 copies. The publication ended when its publisher, The Star Press, became a subsidiary of The Brunei Press.

Two other government publications, Brunei Darussalam Newsletter and Brunei Darussalam Daily Digest, were launched in October 1985 and January 1990, respectively. The former continued publication but was primarily read by foreign audiences and was rarely seen by local readers. The latter ceased publication, though efforts are underway to revive it.

Media Permata was the latest of several local Malay newspapers when it began in January 1995 as a weekly publication focused on local news and features for the Malay-literate audience. It was relaunched as a daily newspaper in July 1998 and has remained so to this day, with an average circulation of 10,000 copies. Media Permata is available from Monday to Friday, with a weekend edition also published for Saturday and Sunday.

The last newspaper to appear before The Brunei Times was News Express. It was launched during the 20th Southeast Asian Games, which were hosted in Bandar Seri Begawan in late 1999. By early 2001, however, it joined the ranks of other newspapers that were unable to sustain themselves in Brunei's competitive newspaper market.

== Newspapers ==
There are currently three local newspapers circulating in Brunei:

BruDirect.com

Brunei's No. 1 news website is an online newspaper and the largest online media platform in Brunei Darussalam, as well as a pioneer in the field of online media. The website receives between 70,000 and 80,000 visits per day.

Pelita Brunei

A free bi-weekly Malay-language newspaper published by the government's Information Department, with a circulation of around 40,000.

Borneo Bulletin

The sultanate's first English-language daily, published by Brunei Press Sdn Bhd, circulates around 20,000 copies on weekdays and 25,000 copies on Saturday and Sunday. It also includes New Straits Times from Malaysia, The Straits Times from Singapore, and The New York Times International Edition.

Media Permata

The sole Malay-language daily, published by Brunei Press Sdn Bhd, has a circulation of around 10,000.

Meanwhile, there was also one defunct newspaper:

The Brunei Times

An English-language broadsheet daily, published from 2006 to 2016, it had a more international outlook compared to the Borneo Bulletin, which focused on community news. Its circulation was around 10,000 copies, with 15,500 copies in 2011 (source: Publisher Data). Foreign newspapers are also widely circulated in Brunei.

== Broadcasting ==
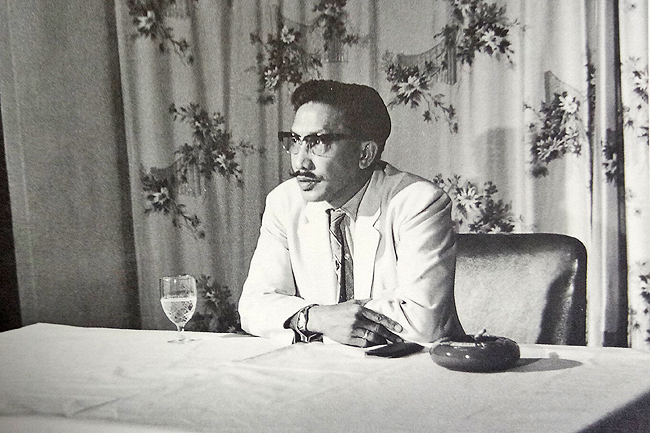
Sultam Omar Ali Saifuddien III giving a titah via Radio Brunei in 1962.

Domestic radio and television in Brunei fall under the auspices of the national broadcaster, Radio Television Brunei (RTB), and KRISTALfm, the country's only commercial radio station, which ended the radio monopoly in 1999. KRISTALfm is operated by KRISTAL Media Sdn Bhd, a subsidiary of the DataStream Technology DevCo Group, which is currently headquartered at Jalan Tungku Link. Established on 2 January 1999, KRISTALfm transmits on frequency 90.7 MHz in the Brunei-Muara District and parts of Tutong from Bukit Subok, and 98.7 MHz in the Belait District and other parts of Tutong from Andulau.

Foreign programming was also available via Direct Broadcast Satellite Pay TV service, through the Malaysian satellite TV service Astro, which was available in Brunei under the brand Kristal-Astro until 2022. Indonesian TV channels, such as TVRI Nasional, TVRI West Kalimantan, TVRI Central Kalimantan, TVRI East Kalimantan, TVRI Nusantara, TVRI North Kalimantan, TVRI South Kalimantan, TVRI Bangka Belitung, TVRI Jambi, TVRI Bengkulu, TVRI West Sumatra, TVRI North Sumatra, TVRI Aceh, TVRI West Java, TVRI Jakarta, TVRI Yogyakarta, TVRI West Sulawesi, TVRI Central Sulawesi, TVRI Papua, TVRI World, TVRI Sport, TVR Parlemen, RCTI, MNCTV, GTV, iNews, SCTV, Indosiar, Moji, Ajwa TV, Mentari TV, Trans TV, Trans7, CNN Indonesia, CNBC Indonesia, Kompas TV, MDTV, RTV, BTV, BeritaSatu, VTV, Nusantara TV, Magna Channel, BN Channel, Garuda TV, Sin Po TV, DAAI TV, Rodja TV, Surau TV, TV9 Nusantara, tvMu, and others, are also accessible to Bruneian and Indonesian audiences (including at the Indonesian Embassy building in Bandar Seri Begawan) through renting or purchasing a free digital satellite receiver decoder.

Malaysian TV and radio stations can be tuned in Brunei via the Bukit Mas and Bukit Lambir transmitters, including:

Bandar Seri Begawan and Bangar

- 97.1MHz: RTM Radio Klasik (Bukit Mas) - Malay
- 98.1MHz: RTM Nasional FM (Bukit Mas) - Malay
- 101.5MHz: RTM Sarawak FM (Bukit Mas) - Sarawakian Malay
- 102.3MHz: RTM TraXX FM (Bukit Mas) - English
- 103.3MHz: RTM Ai FM (Bukit Mas) - Chinese
- 104.1MHz: RTM Red FM (Bukit Mas) - Chinese and English
- 104.9MHz: RTM Limbang FM (Bukit Mas) - Iban, Malay, Bisaya and Lun Bawang
- 102.9MHz: RTM Sabah VFM (Bukit Tampalagus) - Kadazan, Dusun, Murut, Bajau, Chinese, and English
- 88.7MHz: Cats FM

Tutong, Kuala Belait and Seria

- 92.7MHz: RTM Radio Klasik (Bukit Lambir) - Malay
- 91.9MHz: RTM Nasional FM (Bukit Lambir) - Malay
- 88.1MHz: RTM Sarawak FM (Bukit Lambir) - Sarawakian Malay
- 88.9MHz: RTM TraXX FM (Bukit Lambir) - English
- 89.9MHz: RTM Ai FM (Bukit Lambir) - Chinese
- 90.7MHz: RTM Red FM (Bukit Lambir) - Chinese and English
- 105.8MHz: Hitz (Bukit Lambir) - English
- 101.3MHz: Era (Bukit Lambir) - Malay
- 96.6MHz: Sinar (Bukit Lambir) - Malay
- 103.2MHz: My FM (Bukit Lambir) - Chinese
- 102.4MHz: Melody (Bukit Lambir) - Chinese
- 104.0MHz: IKIMfm (Bukit Lambir) - Malay
- 93.3MHz: Cats FM (Bukit Lambir) - Malay & Iban
- 95.7MHz: RTM Miri FM (Bukit Lambir) - Malay, Iban, Kayan & Kenyah

== Internet ==
There appear to be no restrictions on internet use in Brunei, although Freedom House reports that the local forum BruneiTalk was blocked in 2003 after contributors discussed the business dealings of senior officials. As of June 2006, it seemed the site was attempting to move to a different server.

== See also ==
- Brunei
- Communications in Brunei
