= List of television stations in Indonesia =

Digital television regions in Indonesia.

This is a list of television networks and stations in Indonesia. Since the establishment of TVRI, Indonesians could only watch one television channel. In 1989, the government allowed RCTI to broadcast as the first private television network in Indonesia, although only people who had a decoder could watch; it was opened to the public on 24 August 1990. Private television (other than TPI/TVRI) began broadcasting nationally on 24 August 1993.

== National channels ==
The following lists free-to-air television networks and stations in Indonesia.

Depending on types of broadcast, free-to-air television networks and stations can be received by either using a UHF/VHF antenna or free-to-air satellite dish. Since the enactment of Act No. 32 of 2002 on Broadcasting (Undang-Undang No. 32 Tahun 2002 tentang Penyiaran), all private terrestrial television broadcasts licences are granted only to local television stations. Any television entities that wish to broadcast nationally must affiliate with other local stations.

Most of them air on both analog and digital terrestrial, as part of the broadcast system transition from analog to digital. All analog terrestrial broadcasts in Indonesia began to be phased out on 30 April 2022 and completely shut down on 2 November 2022.

=== Networks ===
The following lists television networks sorted by launch date and ownership; both commercial and non-commercial, also whether the broadcast coverage includes all provinces or only a few regions. Parts of these television networks previously received analog terrestrial broadcasting.

Name	Owner	Launch date	Genre	No. of transmitters
TVRI	LPP Televisi Republik Indonesia	24 August 1962	General (Note: National)	361 (35 local stations) (Note: TVRI regional station system is based on province, thus a regional station can have multiple transmitters across its respective provinces.)
TVRI World	LPP Televisi Republik Indonesia	21 December 2010	General (Note: International)	361 (35 local stations)
TVRI Sport	LPP Televisi Republik Indonesia	21 December 2010	Sports	361 (35 local stations)
TVR Parlemen	House of Representatives	8 January 2007	News (Note: Parliament)	6 (Note: The digital broadcast of TVR Parlemen currently only covers Serang, Bandung, Semarang, Surabaya, Lombok, and Medan, only available through the TVRI multiplexing exclusively.)
RCTI	MNC Media	24 August 1989	General	59
MNCTV	MNC Media	23 January 1991 (Note: MNCTV rebranded from their previous name (TPI) on 20 October 2010. MNCTV currently sets its anniversary date on 20 October, even it still traces its age from the inception of TPI in 1991.)	General	59
GTV	MNC Media	8 October 2002	General	57
SCTV	Surya Citra Media	24 August 1990	General	64
Indosiar	Surya Citra Media	11 January 1995	General	64
Moji	Emtek	16 July 2005 (Note: Moji rebranded from their previous name (O Channel) on 21 August 2022. But since Moji's 18th anniversary fell on 2 August 2023, although at that time it was 19 years old, Moji currently sets its anniversary date on that date, even it still traces its age from the inception of O Channel in 2004.)	General	61
Mentari TV	Surya Citra Media	2 November 2022	Children (Note: Mentari TV also airs non-children's programming, such as soap operas.)	61
ANTV	Visi Media Asia (Note: Visi Media Asia's ownership of ANTV and VTV through MDIA.)	1 March 1993	General	56
tvOne	Visi Media Asia	14 February 2008	News and sports (Note: "News-oriented" is not to be confused with "news" network which offers full news-related and factual programming. This refers to any network whose a majority of its programming are news-related and factual, while also airing non-news programming such as sports, religion, entertainment or children's.)	56
VTV	Visi Media Asia	9 January 2023	Children	34 (Note: Only available through the tvOne/ANTV multiplexing exclusively.)
Metro TV	Media Group	25 November 2000	News	81
Magna Channel	Media Group	16 July 2020	Entertainment	62
BN Channel	Media Group	12 September 2022	News (Note: Business)	62
Trans7	Trans Media (Note: Trans Media's ownership of CNN Indonesia with a license from Skydance and CNBC Indonesia with a license from Versant.)	25 November 2001 (Note: Trans7 rebranded from their previous name (TV7) on 15 December 2006. Trans7 currently sets its birthday date on 15 December (along with Trans TV).)	General	65
Trans TV	Trans Media	15 December 2001	General	63
CNN Indonesia	Trans Media	15 December 2015	News	46 (Note: Only available through the Trans TV/Trans7 multiplexing exclusively.)
CNBC Indonesia	Trans Media	10 October 2018	News	46
Kompas TV	KG Media	9 September 2011	News	37 (Note: The digital broadcast of Magna Channel which only covers Malingping, is now part of the Kompas TV network. However, it is not yet known whether these networks will be acquired or only temporarily borrowed until separate legal entities are established.)
RTV	Rajawali Corpora	3 May 2014	General	48 (Note: The digital broadcast of BN Channel which covers Jember, Madiun, Banda Aceh, Banyuwangi, and Kediri, are now part of the RTV network. However, it is not yet known whether these networks will be acquired or only temporarily borrowed until separate legal entities are established.)
iNews	Republikorp (Note: Republikorp's ownership of iNews through iNews Media Group.)	6 April 2015	News and sports	65
Nusantara TV	NT Corp	10 November 2015	General	25 (Note: The digital broadcast of Magna Channel which covers Surabaya, Malang, Jember, Banyuwangi, Kediri, Semarang, Tegal, Jepara, Banyumas, Garut, Cirebon, Sukabumi, Purwakarta, Cianjur, Sumedang, Banjarmasin, Balikpapan, Tarakan, and Makassar, are now part of the Nusantara TV network. However, it is not yet known whether these networks will be acquired or only temporarily borrowed until separate legal entities are established.)
BTV	B Universe	11 October 2022	General	26 (Note: The digital broadcast of BTV only covers 15 regions on a national relay basis, plus 11 local stations which are members of the Disway network on a relay basis and only air 2 hours per day.)
Garuda TV	Digdaya Media Nusantara	5 August 2023	General	52 (Note: The digital broadcast of Magna Channel which covers Bandar Lampung, Manado, Lombok, and Banda Aceh, as well as the digital broadcast of BN Channel which only covers Makassar, are now part of the Garuda TV network. However, it is not yet known whether these networks will be acquired or only temporarily borrowed until separate legal entities are established.)
MDTV	MDTV Media Technologies	28 February 2025	General	66 (Note: The digital broadcast of BN Channel which covers Pamekasan, Tuban, Pacitan, Banyuwangi, Situbondo, Magelang, Blora, Jepara, Purworejo, Sukabumi, Purwakarta, Sumedang, Cianjur, Pangandaran, Lhokseumawe, Balikpapan, and Pematangsiantar, are now part of the MDTV network. However, it is not yet known whether these networks will be acquired or only temporarily borrowed until separate legal entities are established.)
Sin Po TV	Sin Po Media	16 June 2025	News and sports	34

Notes:
- The blue fields ( ) are public television channels.
- Unless cited, some number of affiliates/transmitters are sourced from respective network articles in Wikipedia (either Indonesian or English) without any references.
Overwritten channels:
1. 24 of the regions that Magna Channel covers are overwritten by other channels. (Note: Only available through the Metro TV multiplexing exclusively.) (Note: The digital broadcast of Magna Channel which only covers Yogyakarta, is now Jogja Istimewa TV. However, it is not yet known whether these networks will be acquired or only temporarily borrowed until separate legal entities are established.)
2. 18 of the regions that BN Channel covers are overwritten by other channels. (Note: The digital broadcast of BN Channel which only covers Yogyakarta, Surakarta, and Surabaya, are now part of the tvMu network. However, it is not yet known whether these networks will be acquired or only temporarily borrowed until separate legal entities are established.)

=== Television station groups ===
The following lists media groups (all of which are private) whose members are local television stations, but which do not air joint programs at the same time or simultaneously as with television networks.

Name	Owner	Launch date	Genre	No. of transmitters
JTV	Jawa Pos Group	8 November 2001	General (Note: Local from East Java)	10 (Note: The current digital broadcast of JTV only covers their 10 affiliates or transmitter stations in East Java.)
DAAI TV	Indonesian Tzu Chi Foundation	25 August 2007	General and education	2 (Note: The current digital broadcast of DAAI TV only covers Jakarta and Medan. However, 2 are now Metro TV network, and 1 is now a Garuda TV network.)
Indonesia Network	Bali Post Media Group	February 2012	General (Note: Local from respective regions)	8 (Note: The broadcast network of Indonesia Network only covers Bali (through Bali TV), Yogyakarta and Surakarta (through Jogja TV), Bandung (through Bandung TV), Semarang (through Semarang TV), Palembang (through Sriwijaya TV), Banda Aceh (through Aceh TV), Surabaya (through Surabaya TV), and Pematangsiantar (through Sumut TV).)
tvMu	Muhammadiyah	18 November 2013	Religion (Note: Islam - Muhammadiyah)	3 (Note: The current digital broadcast of tvMu only covers Jakarta, Yogyakarta, Surakarta, and Surabaya. However, 1 former network has its broadcast contract expiring.)
JPM	Jawa Pos Group	17 August 2015	General	25 (Note: The current JPM network only covers their 28 member stations. However, 1 former JPM network is now part of MahakaX like Jak TV in Jakarta, 1 now airs the Polri TV broadcast in Jakarta, 10 are now JTV networks in East Java who are part of Jawa Pos, 9 are now Jawa Pos TV networks who are also part of Jawa Pos, 13 are now Disway networks who have left Jawa Pos, 4 are now included in the Makassar-based Fajar Group (through Fajar National Network), 6 are now Garuda TV networks, 1 is now a Mentari TV network, 3 are now Sin Po TV networks, 1 is now a Kompas TV network, 2 are now BTV networks, 1 is now a Metro TV network, and 1 is now a Moji network.)
STTV Network		January 2016	General	11 (Note: The current broadcast network of STTV only covers Palembang (through Musi TV), Bandar Lampung (through Delta TV), Sukabumi (through Sembada TV), Bandung (through AKTV), Pematangsiantar (through HRTV), Surabaya (through TV9 Nusantara), Malang (through Gajayana TV), Madura (through Madura Channel), Bojonegoro (through B-One TV), Situbondo (through Situbondo TV), Lombok (through Sasambo TV), and Manado (through Mimosa TV). However, 1 former STTV network is now a Garuda TV network.)
Fajar National Network	Fajar Group (Note: Formerly operated by Jawa Pos Group.)	June 2016	General	4 (Note: The current Fajar network only covers their 4 member stations in Eastern Indonesia, especially Makassar (through Fajar TV), Kendari (through Sultra TV), and Kupang (through Timor TV), but in Parepare (through Pare TV) it is still not available until now.)
Disway National Network	Disway (Note: Owned by Dahlan Iskan, after leaving Jawa Pos Group.)	9 February 2018	General	13
Ajwa TV	Surya Citra Media (Note: Ownership through Indonesia Entertainment Group.)	29 October 2020 (Note: Coincides with the birthday of the Islamic prophet Muhammad on 12 Rabi' al-Awwal 1442 AH, based on the Islamic calendar.)	Religion (Note: Islam)	3 (Note: Only available through the Indosiar/SCTV multiplexing exclusively.) (Note: The current digital broadcast of Ajwa TV only covers Samarinda (through Kaltim TV), Bandung (through Rase TV), and Purwakarta (through Cipta TV).)
Harum TV	NT Corp	21 April 2021 (Note: The trial broadcast date and until now has not been officially launched.)	Entertainment	2 (Note: The current digital broadcast of Harum TV, Gold TV, and Bhineka TV is only available through the provision of Nusantara TV multiplexing exclusively in Bandar Lampung and Bali, although until now they are still conducting broadcast trials.)
Gold TV	NT Corp	21 April 2021	Sports	2
Bhineka TV	NT Corp	21 April 2021	Education	2
Jawa Pos TV	Jawa Pos Group	21 May 2021	General	10 (Note: The current digital broadcast of Jawa Pos TV only covers Surabaya, Madiun, Jakarta, Serang, Semarang, Bali, Cianjur, Bandung, Cirebon, Padang (through Padang TV), and Bukittinggi (through Bukittinggi TV).)
Smile TV	Kick Andy Foundation	26 August 2021	General	4 (Note: The current digital broadcast of Smile TV only covers Jakarta, Yogyakarta, Surakarta, Bandung, and Medan.)
CTV		1 November 2023	General	8 (Note: The current CTV network only covers Jakarta, Pati, Bandar Lampung, Semarang, Yogyakarta, Surakarta, Surabaya, Bandung, Medan, and Palembang. However, 1 former CTV network has ceased to air, 1 is now a BTV network, 3 are now Garuda TV networks, 4 are now Moji networks, 3 are now Mentari TV networks, 5 are now Sin Po TV networks, 2 are now ANTV networks, 1 is now a VTV network, 1 is now a Trans7 network, 1 is now a Trans TV network, 1 is now a MDTV network, 1 now airs locally independently under the name Mitra TV in Bandar Lampung, 1 now airs locally independently under the name Carang TV in Ambon and 1 now airs locally independently under the name Gamalama TV in Ternate.)
Stara TV	Stara Media Group	January 2025	Music, (Note: Dangdut, Malay Orchestra, and regional) entertainment, culture, and health (Note: Jamu)	9 (Note: The current local broadcast network of Stara TV only covers Majalengka (reaching as far as Sumedang), Cianjur, Malang, Bandung (consisting of 2 channels between Stara TV Bandung and Stara TV Parahyangan), Yogyakarta, Jakarta, and Bojonegoro (reaching as far as Lamongan and Tuban).)
Republika TV (Note: Broadcast trial through the airing of most television shows produced or distributed by IEG.)	MahakaX	27 January 2025	News, religion, and entertainment (Note: While Republika TV is conducting broadcast trials at this time, in order to air entertainment programs that previously aired on SCTV in the 2010s.)	3 (Note: The current digital broadcast of Republika TV only covers Jakarta, Bandung, Yogyakarta, and Surakarta, only available through the SCTV multiplexing exclusively, although until now they are still conducting broadcast trials.)
Jagantara TV (Note: Broadcast trial through the airing of most television shows produced or distributed by VIVA through MDIA.)	Visi Media Asia	7 April 2025	General (Note: While Jagantara TV is conducting broadcast trials at this time, in order to air programs that previously aired on ANTV and tvOne from 2009.)	21 (Note: The current digital broadcast of Jagantara TV only covers Jakarta, Serang, Pandeglang, Bandung, Yogyakarta, Surakarta, Semarang, Surabaya, Banda Aceh, Medan, Padang, Pekanbaru, Bandar Lampung, Bali, Banjarmasin, Samarinda, Ambon, Pematang Siantar, Tegal, Malang, and Balikpapan, only available through the tvOne/ANTV multiplexing exclusively, although until now they are still conducting broadcast trials.)

== Regional channels ==
Local television stations in Indonesia are divided into local public television stations (as Local Public Broadcasting Institutions or Lembaga Penyiaran Publik Lokal, abbreviated as LPPL), local private television stations, and community television stations.

Due to the unclear distinction of 'television network', 'local bureau', 'regional station' of a television network (Note: Including former local stations.) and 'local television station' in practice, the list below, ordered by province, only includes TVRI stations, independent stations, and stations affiliated (which were formerly independent) with one of the networks formed after the Broadcasting Act signed into law while still retaining their original name.

=== Aceh ===
Region	Ch. (UHF)	Name	Network
Banda Aceh	29	TVRI Aceh	TVRI
Banda Aceh	32	Aceh TV	Indonesia Network

=== Bali ===
Ch. (UHF)	Name	Network
30	TVRI Bali	TVRI
30	Bali TV	Indonesia Network
30	Jawa Pos TV Bali	Jawa Pos TV
36	Surya Manggala TV	Moji (Member of Emtek Group)
36	Big TV	Mentari TV (Member of Emtek Group)

=== Bangka Belitung Islands ===
Region	Ch. (UHF)	Name	Network
Pangkalpinang	30	TVRI Bangka Belitung	TVRI

=== Banten ===
Region	Ch. (UHF)	Name	Network
Serang and Cilegon	38	TVRI Banten	TVRI
Serang and Cilegon	44	Jawa Pos TV Banten	Jawa Pos TV
Serang and Cilegon	44	Banten TV	DNN and BTV

=== Bengkulu ===
Ch. (UHF)	Name	Network
34	TVRI Bengkulu	TVRI
34	RBTV	DNN and BTV

=== Central Java ===
Region	Ch. (UHF)	Name	Network
Semarang	30	TVRI Central Java	TVRI
Semarang	30	TVKU	Suara Merdeka Media
Semarang	30	Semarang TV	Indonesia Network
Purwokerto	28	TVRI Central Java	TVRI
Purwokerto	40	Satelit TV	Independent
Purwokerto	40	BMS TV	Independent
Kebumen	28	TVRI Central Java	TVRI
Kebumen	28	Kebumen TV	Independent (Public)
Pekalongan	30	TVRI Central Java	TVRI
Pekalongan	30	Batik TV	Independent (Public)
Surakarta	29	TVRI Central Java and TVRI Yogyakarta	TVRI
Surakarta	29	TATV	TATV (flagship)
Surakarta	38	TV10 (Solo TV)	Independent (Community)
Temanggung	31	TVRI Central Java	TVRI
Temanggung	31	Temanggung TV	Independent

=== Central Kalimantan ===
Region	Ch. (UHF)	Name	Network
Palangka Raya	30	TVRI Central Kalimantan	TVRI
East Kotawaringin	28	TVRI Central Kalimantan	TVRI
East Kotawaringin	28	Sampit TV	Independent

=== Central Sulawesi ===
Region	Ch. (UHF)	Name	Network
Palu	35	TVRI Central Sulawesi	TVRI

=== East Java ===
Region	Ch. (UHF)	Name	Network
Surabaya	35	TVRI East Java	TVRI
Surabaya	35	Surabaya TV	Indonesia Network
Surabaya	38	Jawa Pos TV	Jawa Pos TV (flagship)
Surabaya	38	JTV	JTV (flagship)
Surabaya	38	Madu TV Surabaya	Independent
Surabaya	44	TV9 Nusantara	Independent
Batu	31	TVRI East Java	TVRI
Batu	31	Batu TV	Independent
Batu	31	Agropolitan TV	Independent (Public)
Malang	31	TVRI East Java	TVRI
Malang	31	Malang TV	Independent
Malang	31	Dhamma TV	Independent
Malang	31	MHTV Malang	Independent
Malang	31	Gajayana TV	STTV
Malang	34	JTV Malang	JTV
Malang	40	Stara TV Malang	Stara TV
Malang	43	UBTV	Independent (Community)
Madiun	34	JTV Madiun	JTV
Madiun	34	Jawa Pos TV Madiun	Jawa Pos TV
Madiun	34	Sakti TV Madiun	Independent
Madiun	43	TVRI East Java	TVRI
Madiun	43	TV9 Nusantara	Independent
Kediri	36	JTV Kediri	Independent
Kediri	36	JTV Kediri	JTV
Kediri	36	DhohoTV	Independent
Kediri	39	TVRI East Java	TVRI
Kediri	45	Kilisuci TV	Independent
Blitar	36	Astro Blitar TV	Independent
Blitar	39	TVRI East Java	TVRI
Tulungagung	36	Madu TV	Independent
Tulungagung	39	TVRI East Java	TVRI

=== East Kalimantan ===
Region	Ch. (UHF)	Name	Network
Samarinda	28	TVRI East Kalimantan	TVRI
Samarinda	31	Samarinda TV	JPM
Samarinda	37	Kaltim TV	Ajwa TV (member of Emtek Group)
Balikpapan	38	TVRI East Kalimantan	TVRI
Balikpapan	44	Balikpapan TV	JPM
Bontang	28	TVRI East Kalimantan	TVRI
Bontang	47	PKTV	Independent

=== East Nusa Tenggara ===
Region	Ch. (UHF)	Name	Network
Kupang	29	TVRI East Nusa Tenggara	TVRI
Kupang	29	AFB TV	Independent
Kupang	29	Timor TV	Fajar National Network
North Central Timor	32	TVRI East Nusa Tenggara	TVRI
North Central Timor	32	Biinmafo TV	Independent
Belu	30	TVRI East Nusa Tenggara	TVRI
Belu	30	Atambua TV	JPM

=== Gorontalo ===
Ch. (UHF)	Name	Network
34	TVRI Gorontalo	TVRI

=== Jakarta ===
Ch. (UHF)	Name	Network
26	CTV	Independent
26	KTV	KG Media
31	Jawa Pos TV	Jawa Pos TV (flagship)
31	Smile TV	Kick Andy
31	UGTV	Independent (Community)
31	JakTV	MahakaX
43	TVRI Jakarta & TVRI West Java	TVRI
43	Stara TV Jakarta	Stara TV
43	Elshinta TV	Independent

=== Jambi ===
Region	Ch. (UHF)	Name	Network
Jambi	44	TVRI Jambi	TVRI
Jambi	44	Jambi TV	DNN and BTV
Jambi	44	Jek TV	DNN and BTV
Sungai Penuh	30	SPTV	Independent

=== Lampung ===
Region	Ch. (UHF)	Name	Network
Bandar Lampung	33	TVRI Lampung	TVRI
Bandar Lampung	33	Davika TV	Independent
Bandar Lampung	33	Saburai TV	DNN and BTV
Bandar Lampung	33	Radar Lampung TV	DNN and BTV
Bandar Lampung	33	Unila TV	Independent (Community)
Bandar Lampung	36	Siger TV	CTV/MOS Network
Bandar Lampung	36	Delta TV	STTV
Bandar Lampung	42	Tegar TV	Independent
Bandar Lampung	42	Mitra TV	Independent

=== Maluku ===
Region	Ch. (UHF)	Name	Network
Ambon	33	TVRI Maluku	TVRI

=== North Kalimantan ===
Region	Ch. (UHF)	Name	Network
Tarakan	30	TVRI North Kalimantan	TVRI
Tarakan	30	Tarakan TV	Independent (Public)

=== North Maluku ===
Region	Ch. (UHF)	Name	Network
Ternate	28	TVRI North Maluku	TVRI

=== North Sulawesi ===
Region	Ch. (UHF)	Name	Network
Manado	29	TVRI North Sulawesi	TVRI
Manado	29	Mimosa TV	STTV
Manado	38	Kawanua TV	JPM

=== North Sumatra ===
Region	Ch. (UHF)	Name	Network
Medan	28	TVRI North Sumatra	TVRI
Medan	37	Berita TV	STTV
Pematangsiantar and Simalungun	29	TVRI North Sumatra	TVRI
Pematangsiantar and Simalungun	29	Sumut TV	Indonesia Network
Pematangsiantar and Simalungun	29	HRTV	STTV
Pematangsiantar and Simalungun	29	Efarina TV	Independent

=== Papua ===
Region	Ch. (UHF)	Name	Network
Jayapura	43	TVRI Papua	TVRI
Jayapura	43	Jaya TV	Independent

=== Riau ===
Region	Ch. (UHF)	Name	Network
Pekanbaru	39	TVRI Riau and TVRI Riau Islands	TVRI
Pekanbaru	45	Riau TV	JPM
Rokan Hilir	40	TVRI Riau	TVRI
Rokan Hilir	40	Riau TV	JPM
Tembilahan	30	TVRI Riau	TVRI
Tembilahan	30	GemilanG TV	Independent (Public)

=== Riau Islands ===
Region	Ch. (UHF)	Name	Network
Batam and Tanjungpinang	48	TVRI Riau Islands and TVRI Riau	TVRI
Batam and Tanjungpinang	48	Batam TV	JPM
Batam and Tanjungpinang	48	TVTPI	DNN and BTV

=== South Kalimantan ===
Region	Ch. (UHF)	Name	Network
Banjarmasin	30	TVRI South Kalimantan	TVRI
Banjarmasin	30	Prima TV	ICTA
Banjarmasin	36	Banjar TV	JPM
Banjarmasin	42	Duta TV	Independent
Tapin	29	TVRI South Kalimantan	TVRI
Tapin	29	Tapin TV	Independent

=== South Sulawesi ===
Region	Ch. (UHF)	Name	Network
Makassar	28	TVRI South Sulawesi	TVRI
Makassar	28	Fajar TV	JPM
Makassar	28	Unhas TV	Independent (Community)
Makassar	34	VE TV	Moji (Member of Emtek Group)
Palopo	29	TVRI South Sulawesi	TVRI
Palopo	29	Ratona TV	Independent
Parepare	28	TVRI South Sulawesi	TVRI
Parepare	28	TV Peduli	Independent (Public)
Bone	30	TVRI South Sulawesi	TVRI
Bone	30	Matajang TV	Independent
Sinjai	32	TVRI South Sulawesi	TVRI
Sinjai	32	Sinjai TV	Independent (Public)

=== South Sumatra ===
Region	Ch. (UHF)	Name	Network
Palembang	29	TVRI South Sumatra	TVRI
Palembang	29	PALTV	DNN and BTV
Palembang	35	Sriwijaya TV	Indonesia Network
Palembang	35	Musi TV	STTV

=== Southeast Sulawesi ===
Region	Ch. (UHF)	Name	Network
Kendari	30	TVRI Southeast Sulawesi	TVRI
Kendari	30	Sultra TV	Fajar National Network

=== West Java ===
Region	Ch. (UHF)	Name	Network
Bandung	32	MQTV	Independent
Bandung	32	AKTV	Independent
Bandung	32	DIVIA UNPAD TV	Independent (Community)
Bandung	32	I Channel	Independent
Bandung	32	Jawa Pos TV Bandung	Jawa Pos TV
Bandung	35	TVRI West Java	TVRI
Bandung	35	UTV	Independent
Bandung	35	Stara TV Bandung	Stara TV
Bandung	35	Stara TV Parahyangan	Stara TV
Bandung	38	PJTV	JPM
Bandung	38	Bandung TV	Indonesia Network
Cianjur	27	Jawa Pos TV Cianjur	Jawa Pos TV
Cianjur	48	Stara TV Cianjur	Stara TV
Cirebon	29	TVRI West Java	TVRI
Cirebon	35	RCTV	
Cirebon	41	Caruban TV	Stara TV
Majalengka	37	TVRI West Java	TVRI
Majalengka	43	Stara TV	Stara TV (flagship)
Purwakarta	30	TVRI West Java	TVRI
Purwakarta	42	AKTV	Independent
Sukabumi	29	TVRI West Java	TVRI
Sukabumi	32	MGSTV	Independent
Sukabumi	32	Sembada TV	AKTV
Sumedang	31	SMTV	JPM
Sumedang	37	TVRI West Java	TVRI
Sumedang	43	ParTV	Independent
Tasikmalaya	39	TVRI West Java	TVRI
Tasikmalaya	42	Radar Tasikmalaya TV	DNN and BTV

=== West Kalimantan ===
Region	Ch. (UHF)	Name	Network
Pontianak	29	TVRI West Kalimantan	TVRI
Pontianak	29	M2TV	Independent
Pontianak	29	Ruai TV	Independent
Pontianak	29	EdTV	Independent (Community)
Pontianak	41	PON TV	JPM
Sambas	36	TVRI West Kalimantan	TVRI
Sambas	36	Sambas TV	JPM

=== West Nusa Tenggara ===
Region	Ch. (UHF)	Name	Network
Mataram	29	TVRI West Nusa Tenggara	TVRI
Mataram	29	Selaparang TV	Independent
Mataram	29	TV9	Independent
Mataram	35	Sasambo TV	STTV
Bima	28	TVRI West Nusa Tenggara	TVRI
Bima	28	Bima TV	Independent

=== West Papua ===
Region	Ch. (UHF)	Name	Network
Manokwari	28	TVRI West Papua	TVRI

=== West Sulawesi ===
Region	Ch. (UHF)	Name	Network
Mamuju	28	TVRI West Sulawesi	TVRI

=== West Sumatra ===
Region	Ch. (UHF)	Name	Network
Padang	30	TVRI West Sumatra	TVRI
Padang	30	Padang TV	Jawa Pos TV
Padang	30	Bukittinggi TV	Jawa Pos TV

=== Special Region of Yogyakarta ===
Ch. (UHF)	Name	Network
29	TVRI Yogyakarta and TVRI Central Java	TVRI
29	ADiTV	Independent
29	TATV Jogja (Sangaji TV)	TATV
29	Matrix TV Yogyakarta	Stara TV
32	RBTV	Kompas TV
35	Jogja TV	Indonesia Network
38	Jogja Istimewa TV	Government of Special Region Of Yogyakarta (Public) (Currently via Magna Channel)

== Satellite channels ==
In addition to the terrestrial system, many television stations in Indonesia also air through satellite and can only be caught using a parabolic antenna. Almost all terrestrial broadcasts, both from national television networks and several local television stations, also air through satellite and can be caught through a parabolic antenna.

=== Government television ===
Name	Owner	Launch date	Type	Genre	Satellite
TV Tabalong	Government of Tabalong Regency	2017/2018	Public	General (Note: Local from Tabalong Regency)	Telkom-4
Indonesiana TV	Ministry of Culture	-	Government	Culture (Note: Indonesia)	Telkom-3S

Note: The blue fields ( ) are public television channels.

=== Private television ===
Name	Owner	Launch date	Genre	Satellite
Ashiil TV	PT Ashiil Cahaya Tauhid	-	Religion (Note: Islam - Salafiyah)	Telkom-4
Ahsan TV	Ahsan TV Media Muslim Indonesia	-	Religion	Telkom-4
Ajwa TV	Surya Citra Media	29 October 2020	Religion	SES-9; Telkom-4
Al Wafa Tarim TV	AM Media (Note: By Al Habib Hasan bin Ismail Al Mudhor)	-	Religion	MEASAT-3b
Al-Bahjah TV	Yayasan Al-Bahjah Cirebon (Note: By Buya Yahya)	-	Religion	MEASAT-3b
Al-Iman TV	Radio Suara Al-Iman	-	Religion	Telkom-4
AllPlay Entertainment	IndiHome TV (Note: By Telkom Indonesia)	2017	Entertainment	Telkom-3S
Bali TV	Bali Post Media Group (Note: Indonesia Network)	26 May 2002	General (Note: Local from Bali)	Telkom-4; MEASAT-3b
BETV	Disway National Network	18 December 2013	General (Note: Local from Bengkulu)	Telkom-4
Efarina TV	Efarina Etaham Group	13 September 2016	General (Note: Local from Simalungun)	Telkom-4
Fatwa TV	Dewan Fatwa Perhimpunan Al-Irsyad	-	Religion	SES-9; Telkom-4
Gazwah TV	Gazwah Enterprise (Note: By Ustadz Khalid Basalamah)	-	Religion and Sharia business	Telkom-4
Hayat TV	PT Hayat Televisi Entertainment	-	General (Note: Local from East Kotawaringin Regency)	Telkom-4
HCBN Indonesia	Indonesia Seventh-day Adventist Church	-	Religion (Note: Christian Protestant - Advent)	Telkom-4
Hijrah TV	Media Hijrah Indonesia	-	Religion	Telkom-4
Hope Channel Indonesia	Indonesia Seventh-day Adventist Church	-	Religion and lifestyle	Telkom-4
I Am Channel	-	-	Religion (Note: Christian)	Telkom-4
IndiHome Shopping	IndiHome TV	-	Shopping	Telkom-3S
Insan TV	Insan Media Televisi	-	Religion	Telkom-4
Izzah TV	Pondok Pesantren Ubay bin Ka'ab Jambi	-	Religion	Telkom-4
Jaya TV	PT Jayapura Televisi	7 February 2007	General (Note: Local from Jayapura)	Telkom-4
JTV	Jawa Pos Group	8 November 2001	General	Telkom-4; MEASAT-3b
Java TV	-	2014	General (Note: Local from Kediri)	Telkom-4
KTV	KG Media	1 September 2008	General (Note: Local from Jakarta)	Telkom-4
Madani TV	Bina Madani Foundation	-	Religion	Nusantara Satu
M Channel	Nex Parabola	-	Music and shopping	Telkom-4; SES-9
Meds TV	Yayasan Media Sunnah Aceh	-	Religion	Telkom-4
MGI TV	Televisi Media Gama Islam	-	Religion	Telkom-4
MTA TV	Yayasan Majlis Tafsir Al-Qur'an	1 October 2014	Religion	Telkom-4
MQH TV	-	-	Religion	Telkom-4
Muadz TV	Islamic Center Mu'adz Bin Jaball	-	Religion	Telkom-4
Naajiya TV	Yayasan An-Naajiya Pasaman Barat	11 October 2015	Religion	Telkom-4
Nabawi TV	Rabithah Alawiyah	-	Religion (Note: Islam - Rabithah Alawiyah)	MEASAT-3b
Niaga TV	-	-	Religion and Sharia business	Telkom-4
On Channel	K-Vision	-	Entertainment, music, tutorial and K-Vision promotion	Telkom-4; MEASAT-3b
PALTV	Disway National Network	9 September 2005	General (Note: Local from Palembang)	Telkom-4
Paliko TV	Media Dakwah Sunnah	7 February 2020 (Note: Seen from the Paliko TV Facebook page.)	Religion	Telkom-4
Pijar TV	Yayasan Pelayanan Media Indonesia	-	Religion (Note: Christian Protestant)	MEASAT-3b
Puldalpii TV	Perkumpulan Lembaga Dakwah dan Pendidikan Islam Indonesia	-	Religion	Telkom-4
RBTV	Disway National Network	18 November 2009	General	Telkom-4
Reformed 21	Indonesian Reformed Evangelical Church, through Stephen Tong Evangelistic Ministries International (Note: By Pr. Stephen Tong)	-	Religion	Telkom-4
Rinjani TV	Media Dakwah As-Sunnah Lombok Timur	-	Religion	Telkom-4
Rodja TV	Cahaya Sunnah Foundation	2009	Religion	Telkom-4; SES-9
Ruai TV	PT Ruai Televisi	-	General (Note: Local from Pontianak)	Telkom-4
Ruang Trampil	IndiHome TV	2014	Lifestyle	Telkom-3S
Salam TV	-	-	Religion	Telkom-4
SalingSapa TV	-	-	Religion	MEASAT-3b
Sunnah Jalan Pasti TV	-	-	Religion	Telkom-4
Surau TV	Dar el-Iman Foundation	24 November 2013	Religion	Telkom-4
TV9 Nusantara	Nahdlatul Ulama (Note: Through PWNU Jawa Timur)	31 January 2010	Religion (Note: Islam - Nahdlatul Ulama)	MEASAT-3b
tvMu	Muhammadiyah	18 November 2013	Religion	Telkom-4
U Channel	United Christian Broadcasters International	26 June 2006	Religion	Telkom-4
Usee Photo	IndiHome TV	2014	Lifestyle (Note: Photography)	Telkom-3S
Wesal TV	Nur Medinah Intermedia	-	Religion	Telkom-4

== Pay channels ==
Pay television in Indonesia can only be received by means of a certain receiver (receiver/decoder) through satellite, cable, or terrestrial.

=== General ===
The following list are channels intended for Indonesian market and available in more than one pay provider.

Name	Owner	Launch date	Genre
Sindonews TV	iNews Media Group	1 March 2006	News
IDX Channel	Indonesia Stock Exchange/iNews Media Group	18 April 2016	News
Champions TV	Indonesia Entertainment Group	11 September 2019	Sports
Metro Globe Network	Media Group	23 November 2021	News
BeritaSatu	B Universe	1 January 2025	News

=== Premium/Exclusive ===
The following list are channels available exclusively in one pay provider or more than one provider in the same ownership.

==== MNC Channels ====
Available on MNC Vision and K-Vision.

Channel name	Former name
Celebrities TV	MNC Infotainment and Infotainment
Entertainment	MNC Entertainment & Comedy Channel
Food Travel	MNC Food & Travel, OKTV, MNC Channel and Food & Travel
Hanacaraka TV	MNC Fashion, MNC Lifestyle, Lifestyle & Fashion & Okezone TV
IDX Channel	MNC Business and iBCM Channel
Kids TV	MNC Kids and Kids Channel
Life	
Music TV	MNC Music Channel, MNC Music and Music Channel
Muslim TV	MNC Muslim and Hidayah
Sindonews TV	MNC News Channel and MNC News
Soccer Channel	
Sportstars	Vision 1 Sports, MNC Sports 1 and MNC Sports
Sportstars 2	MNC Sports 2
Sportstars 3	MNC Sports 3
Sportstars 4	
Vision Prime	Movie Channel & Comedy Channel

==== Transvision ====
Channel name	Former name
!nsert	
Bioskop Indonesia	Bioskop TelkomVision
Dunia Anak	Ananda
Dunia Lain	
Eat & Go	
Golf+	Golf Channel Indonesia
Khazanah	Alif TV
Lingua Channel	
Musik Indonesia	MTV Asia and Channel V
SERU! Channel	Showcase

==== MAXStreamTV ====
Channel name	Former name
Chinese Drama	
MAXeats	
MAXkids	IndiKids and Fun Planet
MAXreels	Usee Prime and AllPlay Entertainment
MAXsports	Usee Sports and AllPlay Sports
MAXstreak	
MAXstream TV	Also available on the MAXstream website and app for a fee customers

==== First Media ====
Channel name	Former name
Balai Kota Bandung	
Balai Kota Channel	
First Atmos	Hi!
First Football	BeritaSatu Sports
First Lifestyle	BeritaSatu Lifestyle and The First Comedy Network
Jakarta Globe News Channel	BeritaSatu English
Kairos	
KaraOKE Channel	
Liga Mahasiswa	BeritaDua
SPH Channel	
West Java Network	

==== Nex Parabola ====
Channel name	Former name
Champions TV 1	Bola Indonesia and TSB 1
Champions TV 2	TSB 2
Champions TV 3	
Champions TV 5	
Champions TV 6	
Champions Golf 1	
Champions Golf 2	
Champions TV Goal	
Champions TV Xtra HD	
Citra Bioskop	
Citra Culinary & Travel	
Citra Dangdut	
Citra Drama	
Citra Drama+	
Citra Entertainment	
Citra Muslim	
Horee!	
Hip Hip Horee!	
Nex Sports	Nex Football
PET TV	
Voli TV	
Voli TV 2	

==== Biznet Home ====
Channel name	Note
B Adventure	
B Kids	
B Lifestyle	

== Internet channels ==
=== General ===
The following list are private channels that can be watched free of charge only through internet television providers (other than YouTube).

Name	Owner	Genre	Availability
Dens Learning & Knowledge	Digdaya Duta Digital	Education	DensTV
Dens Life & Style	Digdaya Duta Digital	Lifestyle	DensTV
Dens Play	Digdaya Duta Digital	Lifestyle	DensTV
Dens Showbiz	Digdaya Duta Digital	Entertainment	DensTV
MAX Reels	Telkom Indonesia	General	MAXStreamTV
MAX Kids	Telkom Indonesia	Children	MAXStreamTV
MAX Sports	Telkom Indonesia	Sport	MAXStreamTV
MAX Eats	Telkom Indonesia	Lifestyle (Note: Culinary)	MAXStreamTV
MAX Streak	Telkom Indonesia	Sport (Note: Esports)	MAXStreamTV
GGS TV (Note: Only focuses on airing reruns of the soap opera Ganteng-Ganteng Serigala (and its sequel) which aired on SCTV in 2014–2015, for a non-stop 24-hour live streaming on Vidio. Replaced RANS Channel (from RANS Entertainment owned by Raffi Ahmad and Nagita Slavina, and operated by Elang Mahkota Teknologi).)	Amanah Surga Productions (Note: Operated by Elang Mahkota Teknologi.)	Entertainment	Vidio
Musica	Musica Studio's	Music (Note: Only airs the songs produced by Musica Studio's.)	Vidio
Lingkar TV	PT Lingkar Taqwa Vision	General (Note: Local station from Pati Regency, Central Java)	Website
Salira TV	PT Salira Info Utama	General (Note: Local station from Tasikmalaya Regency, West Java)	Website

=== Premium/Exclusive ===
The following list are channels that can be watched for a fee only through internet television providers.

Name	Owner	Genre	Availability
Champions Fight	Indonesia Entertainment Group	Sport (Note: Combat sport)	Vidio

== Defunct ==
Station/channel	Closing date	Note
MTV Indonesia	1 January 2007	Returned by Singapore-based MTV Asia on 1 January 2007. Then replaced by the United Kingdom-based MTV 90s on 1 September 2022.
Televisi Paling Indonesia	20 October 2010	TPI went bankrupt and Tutut Suharto later rebranded TPI to MNCTV on 20 October 2010.
Spacetoon Indonesia	17 May 2013	(Note: First change of what is now MDTV (through terrestrial), then Spacetoon moved to satellite television.)
Bloomberg TV Indonesia	26 August 2015	Returned by Bloomberg Television Asia Pacific based at Marina Bay Financial Centre Singapore and Pacific Place Jakarta.
MD Channel	18 December 2016	(Note: The collaboration with K-Vision ended, before moving to a collaboration with Lejel Group through the name MD Entertainment TV (as a satellite television station), and the first forerunner before MDTV (via terrestrial))
Indonesia TV	30 December 2016	(Note: On 30 December 2016, digital broadcast of Indonesia TV which only covered Jakarta suddenly ceased to air for no apparent reason.)
MD Entertainment TV	31 October 2019	(Note: The cooperation with Lejel Group ended and the second forerunner before MDTV (via terrestrial).)
KTI	31 March 2020	(Note: On 31 March 2020, digital broadcast of KTI which only covered Jakarta suddenly ceased to air for no apparent reason.)
Aswaja TV	2023	(Note: Islamic missionary satellite television station from Banten Province, Indonesia. Initially broadcast via the Telkom-4 satellite, however Aswaja TV broadcasts disappeared from the satellite in 2023.)
TV Edukasi	1 February 2023	Switched to YouTube channels Televisi Edukasi and Rumah Belajar Kemdikbud.
MYTV	8 March 2023	(Note: Since around November 2022, digital broadcast of MYTV which only covers Jakarta and Medan is still inactive, after suddenly disappearing for no apparent reason, after the termination of analog broadcasts.)
The Indonesia Channel	31 March 2023	(Note: The Indonesia Channel launched on 2 June 2014 and ceased on 29 February 2016, then launched again on 2 October 2019 and ceased again on 31 March 2023. The exact cause of the channel's closure is unknown.)
Gramedia TV	31 July 2023	(Note: On 31 July 2023, digital broadcast of Gramedia TV which only covered Jakarta suddenly ceased to air for no apparent reason.)
RIM TV	30 December 2023	(Note: On 30 December 2023, digital broadcast of RIM TV which only covered Jakarta suddenly ceased to air for no apparent reason.)
HDAS TV	2024	(Note: Local television station from Bandung, West Java. Broadcast coverage only includes Bandung City, Cimahi City, Bandung Regency and West Bandung Regency. HDAS TV broadcasts disappeared from digital broadcasts suddenly.)
Betawi TV	31 December 2024	(Note: On 31 December 2024, digital broadcast of Betawi TV which only covered Jakarta suddenly ceased to air for no apparent reason. change of what is now Astha TV)
SEA Today	30 June 2025	(Note: On 30 June 2025, SEA Today ceased to air, the impact of budget efficiency which resulted in mass layoffs of employees.)
Astha TV	25 May 2026	(Note: Local television station from Jakarta. Broadcast coverage only includes Jakarta Regency and West Jakarta Regency. Astha TV broadcasts disappeared from digital broadcasts suddenly.)

== See also ==
- Television in Indonesia
- List of radio stations in Indonesia

== Notes ==
Owner

Genre

Other
