= Television in Indonesia =

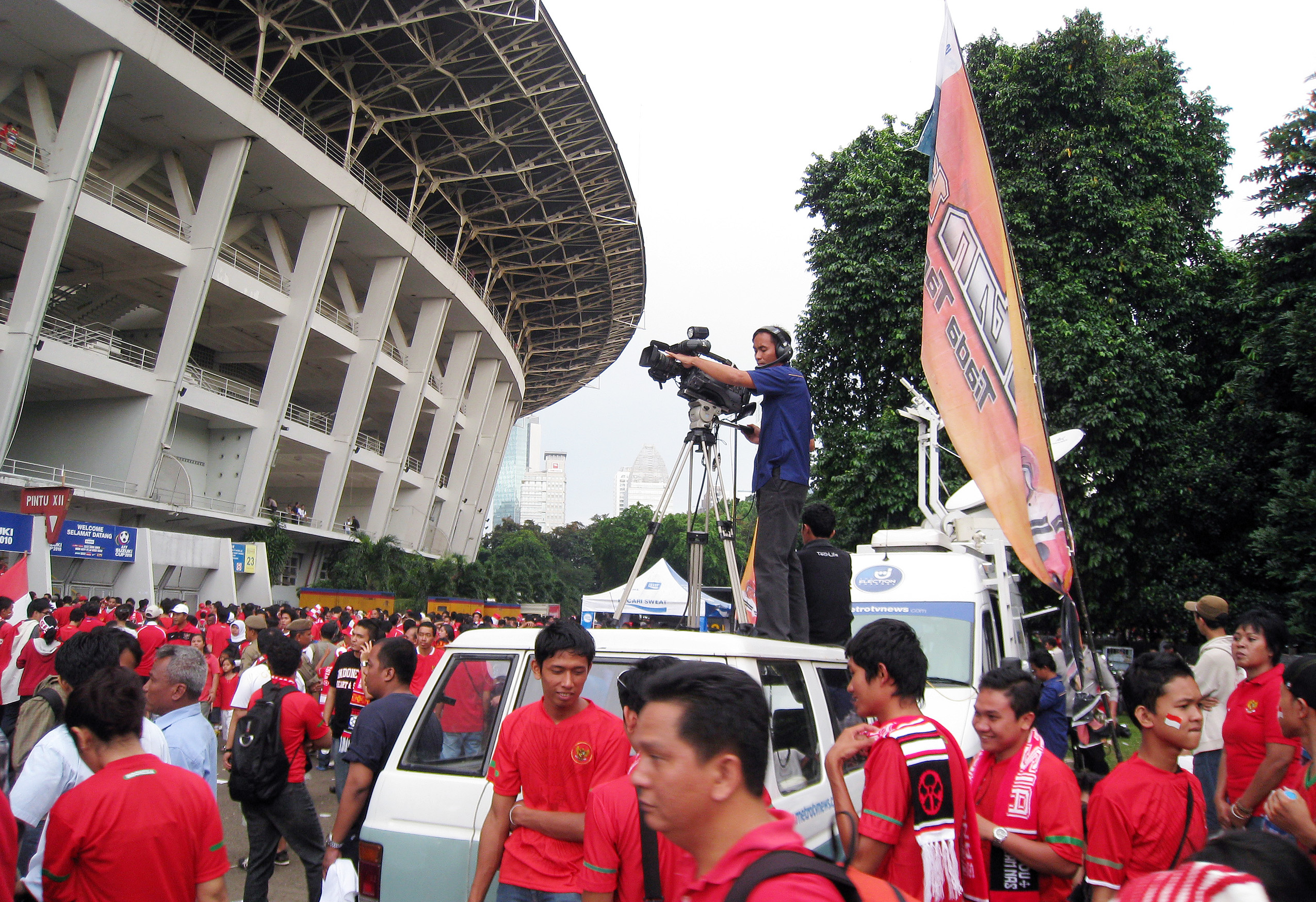
A Metro TV cameraman in Gelora Bung Karno Stadium Jakarta, reporting the 2010 AFF Suzuki Cup match.

Indonesia was the third country in Southeast Asia to create a state-run station, TVRI which began broadcasting on August 24th 1962 during the opening ceremony of the 1962 Asian Games. TVRI held a television monopoly in Indonesia until 1989 when the first commercial station, RCTI began as a local television station and was subsequently granted a national license a year later. Indonesian television is regulated by both Ministry of Communication and Digital Affairs (Komdigi) for frequency matters and Indonesian Broadcasting Commission (KPI) for content matters.

Each of the networks have a wide variety of programs, ranging from traditional shows, such as wayang performances, to Western-based programs such as Indonesian Idol, Family Feud, MasterChef, Top Model and The Voice.

One typical television show common to almost every network is called a sinetron. A sinetron is usually a drama series, following the soap opera format, but can also refer to any fictional series. Sometimes it can be comedic, like the popular Bajaj Bajuri series, featuring a bajaj driver and the people he drives around.

There are a number of awards given for excellences in Indonesian television, notably Panasonic Gobel Awards (defunct) and Indonesian Television Awards (since 2016), as well as Anugerah KPI held by the KPI.

== History ==
=== Early years ===
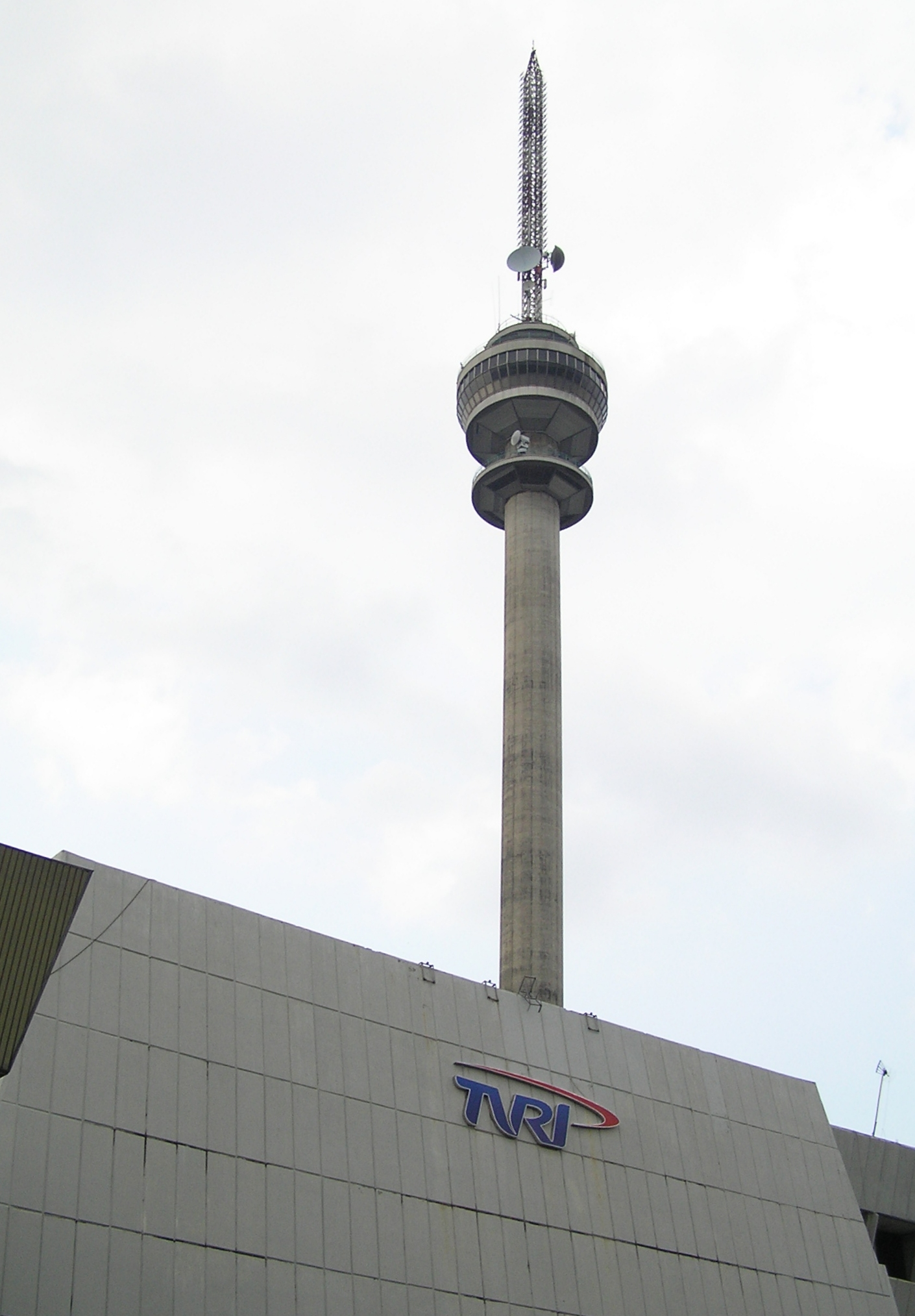
TVRI head office, the first TV station in Indonesia.

The first time the Indonesian public was exposed to television was in 1955 in Yogyakarta, during a municipal fair commemorating the city's bicentennial (Republican spelling Indonesian: Pekan Raja 200 Tahun Kota Jogjakarta). These first television sets were brought to Indonesia from the Soviet Union.

However, the initial idea to establish a television station in Indonesia was put forward by then Minister of Information Maladi as far as 1952. The argument is that the station would be useful for the socialization of the upcoming 1955 general election, but the idea was failed because the idea was deemed as too expensive by the cabinet.

On July 25, 1961, Maladi, who has become Minister of Information, signed an agreement (SK Menpen) to create a committee for the preparation of the establishment of television in Indonesia. This was established as a part of the preparation for the fourth Asian Games. There was only a year to create a studio, broadcast tower, and other technical equipments in the former site of the Information Academy at Senayan. In that short period of preparation, Sukarno had a very prominent role, going as far as to personally choosing the equipment and where they should be imported from. The first experimental TV broadcast was the live coverage of the celebration of the 17th Anniversary of Indonesia's Independence on the morning August 17, 1962 from Jakarta's Merdeka Palace.

At 14.30, August 24, 1962, the citizens of Jakarta witnessed the live broadcast of the opening ceremony of the 4th Asian Games from Gelora Bung Karno. This broadcast was held by the Television Division of the Radio and Television Organizing Committee Bureau. This day is now recognized as the birth of Televisi Republik Indonesia or TVRI, the first television network in Indonesia, as well as its main channel TVRI.

On October 20, 1963, President Sukarno issued a Presidential Decree on the formation of the TVRI Foundation (Jajasan TVRI, later spelled Yayasan TVRI) as its governing body. In the first year of the TVRI broadcast, there are 10,000 television owners in Indonesia. Since then, the Foundation allotted a tax for television-owners until 1969, when the television property tax was transferred through mail and air deliveries nationwide. From 1963 to 1976, TVRI established television stations in Yogyakarta (1965), Medan (1970), Makassar (1972), Balikpapan (1973), and Palembang (1974). TVRI then quickly formed as a network made up of 12 television stations and 8 production studios, one national and 7 regional. Color broadcasting was introduced on September 1, 1979 on TVRI's national and local stations, which expanded to other provincial capitals.

Advertisements were introduced to TVRI on March 1, 1963, to cope with the increasing broadcast hours. This advertisement was known as Siaran Niaga (literally "advertisement broadcast"). Currently television advertisements and other general advertisings are known simply as iklan ("advertisement").

On August 16, 1976, the Domestic Satellite Communication System (Sistem Komunikasi Satelit Domestik or SKSD) through Palapa A1 was inaugurated. This communication satellite was the first satellite owned by Indonesia and one of the first satellite operated by a developing country. Palapa A1 had 12 transponders which allows TVRI to distribute its broadcast reach nationally.

On January 5, 1981, President Suharto issued an instruction to remove the Siaran Niaga advertisements from TVRI. The reason for this is from the belief that advertisements may create negative effects for the development of Indonesia during that time. This instructions had created pros and cons, especially because there is no research behind this statement. One month later, the Department of Information's Research and department division decided to perform a research about the effect of advertisements to national development programs aired within the TVRI network. In March 1981, the ban on commercial advertisements was in force on TVRI, making it funded by both the licence fee and government budgets for years.

=== The beginning of private television ===
As the only TV station in Indonesia for many years, aside from coverage of state events, sessions of the People's Consultative Assembly and national holidays, as well as news, educational programming and regional programs in the many regional languages, TVRI had also broadcast entertainment, child-oriented and sports programmes to suit the needs of the viewing public. As part of the plans of the Fifth Development Cabinet, however, noticing how its ASEAN neighbours had operated private television channels with success (Malaysia had its own by then sole private TV channel TV3, which opened in 1984 and the Philippines and Thailand also had private TV stations in conjunction with the state networks, while TVRI was by then in the same situation as in Laos, Myanmar, Cambodia and Brunei which all had only a state TV channel while Vietnam had both national and state-sponsored regional stations), the door was opened for the formation of private television stations and an end to the TVRI monopoly, while the former was starting to become a true national network when it launched TVRI Program 2 (Programma 2), which signed on on April 1, 1989, as the Metro Jakarta station offering both national programming and local productions.

TVRI and the Ministry of Information helped prepare the nation as well for satellite and cable TV when Jakarta viewers received the first cable TVRI broadcasts from Channels 6 and 8 in 1986 - the year an open skies policy led to the broadcasts of Malaysian TV and the Singaporean Mediacorp network expanding to viewers in the Riau Islands, Sumatra and Borneo, the latter already having received the broadcasts of Bruneian channel RTB since its launch in 1976. In return, TVRI would now beam its signals to these countries thru relay transmitters.

Initially, private television stations may only air terrestrially in a certain province and must air in a subscription scheme with a set-top box; this scheme, officially called Limited Channel Broadcasting (Siaran Saluran Terbatas, SST), was the scheme that was used when Rajawali Citra Televisi Indonesia or RCTI, Indonesia's first private television station, was inaugurated on August 24, 1989. The television station was owned by Suharto's son Bambang Trihatmodjo's Bimantara Group (now MNC Group) subsidiary Bimantara Citra and Peter Sondakh's Rajawali Wira Bhakti Utama (now Rajawali Corpora) (hence the "Rajawali Citra"). (RCTI was an initiative of Sondakh.) Unlike TVRI, RCTI was allowed to broadcast advertisements up to 15% its broadcast hours, and began as a local station serving Greater Jakarta before broadcasting nationwide. TVRI would finally air advertisements since 1998 after the country transitioned to democracy. On August 24, 1990, the third television station, Surabaya Centra Televisi (SCTV, later stands for Surya Citra Televisi) was inaugurated; it was then owned by "King of Cineplex" Sudwikatmono's Subentra Group (later Indika Group). SCTV was a FTA channel and was granted the same advertising privileges as RCTI - the government having bowed to public and industry pressure to end the decoder and subscription system for the private channels that same year, resulting in RCTI granted its free to air broadcast licence and the ability for both channels to create regional channels in competition with TVRI.

At the end of 1990, TVRI became a national network with two channels: one national and three local stations operating in Jakarta, Bandung and Surabaya, with regional channels sharing the national programming schedule while airing regional opt-outs.

Also in 1990, the government issued a decree forbidding private television stations from airing commercial advertising in languages other than Indonesian. At that time, all private television stations except TVRI air commercials. Meanwhile, private television stations were able to broadcast special programs in English at certain times; for example, special interviews with foreign leaders.

On September 13, 1990, the president issued Presidential Decree no. 40 regarding the television property tax collection between Yayasan TVRI and PT Mekatama Raya, a private company owned by Sudwikatmono and Sigit Hardjojudanto. Since the beginning of 1991, this private company was the responsible body that accepted the television property tax paid by TVRI viewers nationwide. The reason for this change is to increase revenue from the lower 1969 post and air mail system.

On January 23, 1991, PT Cipta Televisi Pendidikan Indonesia (TPI) started its broadcast of educational programs with some advertisements. The company was led by Siti Hardjanti. During its first years, TPI shared channels with TVRI and as a blocktimer then with the channel, its facility and operational staff, whenever TVRI did not broadcast, were supported by the channel. TPI would later become the first Indonesian UHF television station when it launched free to air broadcasts on the Channel 34 frequency in 1992.

On April 14, 1992, the Directorate General of Radio, Television and Films decided that Yayasan TVRI will phase out the television tax altogether when, after one year, PT Mekatama Raya failed to increase the revenue from payments made by viewers, thus transitioning to one fully financed by the national budget.

In October 1992, Department of Information issued television broadcast licenses for six companies: PT Indosiar Visual Mandiri or Indosiar (Jakarta), PT Sanitya Mandara Televisi (Yogyakarta), PT Merdeka Citra Televisi Indonesia (Semarang), PT Ramako Indotelevisi (Batam), PT Cakrawala Andalas Televisi or ANTV (Lampung), and PT Cakrawala Bumi Sriwijaya Televisi (Palembang). Of all these six television companies, only PT Indosiar Visual Mandiri and PT Cakrawala Andalas Televisi were able to broadcast continuously. On February 28, 1993, PT Cakrawala Andalas Televisi, a joint venture between Agung Laksono and the Bakrie family, started its first broadcast. The broadcast station was initially planned to be located in Lampung, but later moved to Jakarta, in a building at the Kuningan region. PT Indosiar Visual Mandiri, owned by Salim Group, started its first broadcast on January 11, 1995.

In March 1998, TV Kabel Indovision, operated by PT Matahari Lintas Cakrawala under the leadership of Peter F. Gontha, started its operation as the first cable television system in Indonesia (the first cable television was operated in the United States in 1972). Previously, since 1996, Indovision had operated using television decoders and parabolic antennas as the first DTH satellite pay TV system in the nation. The following year, digital broadcasts debuted to replace analogue ones, a first for Indonesian pay TV. Within the same month, Publik Khatulistiwa TV (PKTV) was first founded as a community television station run by Pupuk Kaltim employees at Bontang, although it only became a limited company 3 years later, while also PKTV has not expanded its coverage nationally unlike SCTV or ANTV.

=== Reform era ===
In October 1999, out of fourteen applicants that had been received by Department of Information, five television broadcasting companies passed the selection and received broadcast licenses. These companies are: Trans TV (PT Televisi Transformasi Indonesia, led by Ishadi, the former head of TVRI), Metro TV (operated by Grup Media Indonesia which was led by Surya Paloh), Global TV (PT Global Informasi Bermutu, established by Timmy Habibie), Lativi (PT Lativi Media Karya, owned by Abdul Latief), and TV7 (PT Duta Visual Nusantara Tivi Tujuh). Metro TV was the first to broadcast on November 25, 2000, as the seventh Indonesian television channel.

On June 7, 2000, following the changes after the dissolution of the Department of Information by President Abdurrahman Wahid, TVRI was officially able to change its status into a service company (perusahaan jawatan). The status later changed once again into a state-owned corporation before it changed as an independent public broadcasting institution (lembaga penyiaran publik) in 2005.

In December 2002, Act No. 32 of 2002 on Broadcasting was enacted by the People's Consultative Assembly, replacing previous Act No. 24 of 1997. Under the act, aside from transforming TVRI into a public broadcaster, all national private terrestrial television stations (which previously could broadcast nationwide from a central station) must transform themselves into a network of local stations, similar to those in the United States and Brazil. In practice, are more similar to that of neighboring Philippines. National coverage of TV channels are increasingly centralized, especially with post-2002 TV channels where it originally having local TV stations until they changed their name to national counterparts (like Kompas TV Jawa Barat and NET. Batam), and it is often limited to very few hours. On the other side, the Department of Information later resurfaced under several forms before formed into the current Ministry of Communication and Information Technology under SBY administration.

The use of Chinese was banned from 1965 to 1994 in television, but its use did not come until years later. In November 2000, after more than 3 decades, Metro TV would become the first to broadcast news in Mandarin Chinese to the Indonesian Chinese community. Indonesia is one of a few countries that use logos in light gray during commercial breaks (similar to Turkey in practice) (and, in some stations, have their logos in a "shiny" effect when on air), although not all local TV stations follow this practice, and the TVRI logo is always in light gray in on-air since 2019 (see more at Digital on-screen graphic by country#Indonesia).

== Types of television broadcast ==
Act No. 32 of 2002 classified television broadcast in Indonesia, regardless of its transmission medium, as follows:

- Public Broadcasting Institution (Lembaga Penyiaran Publik or LPP): consists of TVRI and independent local public stations.
- Private Broadcasting Institution (Lembaga Penyiaran Swasta or LPS): consists of private networks and stations, both national and local-scope.
- Subscription Broadcasting Institution (Lembaga Penyiaran Berlangganan or LPB): consists of pay television providers.
- Community Broadcasting Institution (Lembaga Penyiaran Komunitas, LPK): consists of community television stations.

Despite this, a number of indirectly government-operated channels still exist, some albeit satellite-based, thus formally can't included in any types above. Examples are TV Edukasi (owned by Ministry of Education, Culture, Research, and Technology), GPR TV (owned by Ministry of Communication and Information Technology), and two local TV channels in Bontang owned by state-owned corporations, LNGTV (owned by Badak NGL, a subsidiary of Pertamina) and Publik Khatulistiwa TV (owned by Pupuk Kalimantan Timur).

=== Terrestrial ===
Terrestrial television was started with the establishment of TVRI. Most parts of Indonesia only had one television channel (with TVRI has a second television channel for Jakarta region) until the establishment of RCTI as a first private television in Indonesia. Currently there are about 28 major national free-to-air terrestrial television networks in Indonesia, most of them are private broadcasters. Act No. 32 of 2002 requires private television networks to broadcast local programming from local stations minimum of 10% of their airtime.

Since early 2011, the authority allowed (Indonesian) digital television to simulcast with analog television in some areas. Indonesia adopted the European DVB-T format but decided to switch to DVB-T2 on 1 January 2012. Analog broadcast phased out on 2 November 2022.

=== Satellite ===
Satellite television has been available in Indonesia since Indovision, currently known as MNC Vision, was incorporated on 8 August 1988 and officially launched on 16 January 1994. Since then, technology for satellite television has changed from analogue to digital. Satellite television in Indonesia uses the DVB-S/S2 format. Up to now, there are only five satellite pay TV operators which still operating at almost the same azimuth, vertical angle and bearing, such as MNC Vision, K-Vision, Transvision, Nex Parabola and Accola Play.

Besides pay television services, free-to-air satellite television is available nationwide through various satellites, such as Telkom-4, Telkom-3S, MEASAT-3b, SES-9 and Nusantara Satu. There are dozens of Indonesian and foreign satellite television channels that can be received via satellite dish without monthly fee. Much of them are religious (particularly Islamic) channels, with some of them are national networks and local stations as well as entertainment channels. Examples include TV Edukasi, GPR TV, RRI NET, TV MUI, Ajwa TV and Spacetoon.

=== Cable and IPTV ===
PT Broadband Multimedia Tbk is the first operator for cable TV in Indonesia under the brand name "Kabelvision" on 16 January 1994. In 2006, the company launched Digital1 along with the technology changing from analogue to digital. The company then change the name of the company to PT First Media Tbk on 8 September 2007 and also launched new brand First Media. Its coverage is now only available in metropolitan areas, such as Greater Jakarta, Bandung, Semarang, Surakarta, Yogyakarta, Surabaya, Malang, Bali, Medan metropolitan area and Batam. Cable TV in Indonesia is using DVB-C format.

=== Mobile ===
Mobile TV has two categories, free-to-air and Pay TV. Free-to-air TV available for years in Indonesia. Free-to-air is using analogue technology like UHF/VHF. Now free-to-air TV has adopted digital technology. In Indonesia, free-to-air TV is using DVB-H format.

There was two operator for mobile pay TV in Indonesia (most notably Nexdrive which affiliated with Nexmedia). It was only available in Jakarta and currently ceased to exist.

== Most-viewed networks ==
All viewed networks.

Position	Channel	Group	Share of total viewing (%)
1	RCTI	MNC Media (MNC Asia Holding)	44.8%
2	MNCTV	MNC Media (MNC Asia Holding)	44.8%
3	GTV	MNC Media (MNC Asia Holding)	44.8%
4	iNews	iNews Media Group (Republikorp)	44.8%
5	SCTV	Surya Citra Media (Emtek)	27.6%
6	Indosiar	Surya Citra Media (Emtek)	27.6%
7	Trans7	Trans Media (CT Corp)	13.1%
8	Trans TV	Trans Media (CT Corp)	13.1%
9	ANTV	Visi Media Asia (Bakrie Group)	11.9%
10	tvOne	Visi Media Asia (Bakrie Group)	11.9%
11	TVRI	LPP Televisi Republik Indonesia	1.4%
12	Metro TV	Media Group	1.2%

== See also ==
- List of television stations in Indonesia
- Mass media in Indonesia
