= Nusantara TV =

Indonesian television station

- Type: Television broadcaster
- Country: Indonesia
- Broadcast area: Bali, most of Java, and small parts of Sumatra, Kalimantan, and Sulawesi
- Headquarters: NT Tower Building, Jl. Pulomas Selatan No.20, Kayu Putih, Pulo Gadung, East Jakarta

Programming
- Language: Indonesian
- Picture format: 1080i HDTV (downscaled to 16:9 576i for the SDTV feed)

Ownership
- Owner: NT Corp

History
- Launched: 10 November 2015
- Founder: Nurdin Tampubolon

Links
- Webcast: www.nusantaratv.com/live
- Website: www.nusantaratv.com

Availability

Terrestrial
- See #Broadcast network

Streaming media
- IndiHome TV: Watch live (IndiHome customers only)
- Vidio: Watch live
- YouTube: Watch live

PT Nusantara Media Mandiri, commonly known as Nusantara TV (NTV, stylized in all-lowercase), is an Indonesian digital national network based in East Jakarta. It is owned by NT Corp. NTV launched on 10 November 2015 and obtained a permanent broadcasting permit (IPP) from the Indonesian government in 2019.

The coverage of Nusantara TV currently include the digital television regions of Bali, Central Java (only regions -1, -3, -6, and -7), East Java (except regions -3, -5, -8, and -9), Jabodetabek, Lampung-1, North Sumatra-1, Riau Islands-1, Special Region of Yogyakarta, South Kalimantan-1, South Sulawesi-1 and West Java (except region -4).

== History ==
NTV is owned by PT Nusantara Media Mandiri, a business unit of NT Corp, that engages in digital television broadcasting media with national coverage and has the status of a private broadcasting institution. Nusantara TV and its logo has a trademark certificate from Ministry of Law and Human Rights of Republic of Indonesia, based on Act No.20 of 2016, with registration number IDM000806608 regarding trademarks since 14 October 2019.

NTV received its broadcasting operation license in 2014 and permanent broadcasting operation permit (permanent IPP) in 2016, granted by Ministry of Communication and Digital Affairs of Republic of Indonesia through decree No.463/T.02.02/2019 dated 16 October 2016. Nusantara TV began officially broadcast on 10 November 2015 following a trial in 20 cities on 15 June 2016. Digital terrestrial broadcast nationwide throughout Indonesia began on 28 June 2016.

== Identity ==
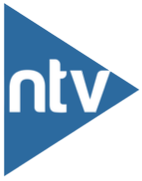
The first logo of Nusantara TV (10 November 2015 – 14 October 2019)

Nusantara TV's second logo (14 October 2019 – 1 December 2020), used during the show (1 December 2020 – present). A transparent version of this logo is used during commercial breaks

On 14 October 2019, NTV launched its new logo, which features a triangle with a blue background and the word NTV in white. This logo has received a certificate of Trademark Protection from the Minister of Law and Human Rights, Directorate General of Intellectual Property with Number IDM000806608.

== Broadcast network ==
Company name	Station name	Area	Frequency (DVB-T2)	Quality	Mux Digital
PT Nusantara Media Mandiri	Nusantara TV	DKI Jakarta, Bogor, Depok, Tangerang, South Tangerang, Bekasi	40 UHF	HD	Trans TV Jakarta
PT Nusantara Media Mandiri Bali	Nusantara TV Bali	Denpasar, Singaraja	39 UHF	HD	NTV Bali (Badung) dan NTV Singaraja (Buleleng)
PT Nusantara Media Mandiri Lampung	Nusantara TV Lampung	Bandar Lampung	42 UHF	HD	NTV Bandar Lampung
PT Nusantara Media Mandiri Tapanuli	Nusantara TV Medan	Medan	28 UHF	HD	TVRI Sumatera Utara (TVRI Bandar Baru)
PT Nusantara Media Mandiri Yogyakarta	Nusantara TV Yogyakarta	Yogyakarta, Surakarta	29 UHF	SD	TVRI Yogyakarta (TVRI Pathuk)
PT Nusantara Media Mandiri Parahyangan	Nusantara TV Bandung	Bandung, Cimahi	35 UHF	SD	TVRI Jawa Barat (TVRI Panyandakan)
PT Nusantara Media Mandiri Batam	Nusantara TV Batam	Batam, Bintan, Tanjung Pinang, Karimun	48 UHF	HD	TVRI Kepulauan Riau (TVRI Batam dan TVRI Kijang)
PT Mitra Media Digital	Nusantara TV Surabaya (Note: Nusantara TV is temporarily broadcasting via Magna Channel.)	Surabaya, Lamongan, Mojokerto, Gresik, Sidoarjo, Pasuruan, Bangkalan	38 UHF	SD	MetroTV Surabaya
PT Mitra Media Digital	Nusantara TV Malang	Malang	34 UHF	SD	MetroTV Malang
PT Mitra Media Digital	Nusantara TV Jember	Jember, Bondowoso	46 UHF	SD	MetroTV Jember
PT Mitra Media Digital	Nusantara TV Banyuwangi	Banyuwangi	34 UHF	SD	MetroTV Banyuwangi
PT Mitra Media Digital	Nusantara TV Kediri	Kediri	36 UHF	SD	MetroTV Kediri
PT Mitra Media Digital Satu	Nusantara TV Semarang	Semarang, Ungaran, Demak, Kudus	36 UHF	SD	MetroTV Semarang
PT Mitra Media Digital Satu	Nusantara TV Tegal	Tegal, Pekalongan	39 UHF	SD	MetroTV Tegal
PT Mitra Media Digital Satu	Nusantara TV Jepara	Jepara, Rembang, Pati	35 UHF	SD	MetroTV Jepara
PT Mitra Media Digital Satu	Nusantara TV Purwokerto	Banyumas, Cilacap, Purbalingga	34 UHF	SD	MetroTV Banyumas
PT Mitra Media Digital Dua	Nusantara TV Garut	Garut, Tasikmalaya	28 UHF	SD	MetroTV Garut
PT Mitra Media Digital Dua	Nusantara TV Cirebon	Cirebon, Kuningan, Indramayu	32 UHF	SD	MetroTV Cirebon
PT Mitra Media Digital Dua	Nusantara TV Sukabumi	Sukabumi	32 UHF	SD	MetroTV Sukabumi
PT Mitra Media Digital Dua	Nusantara TV Purwakarta	Purwakarta, Karawang, Subang	36 UHF	SD	MetroTV Purwakarta
PT Mitra Media Digital Dua	Nusantara TV Cianjur	Cianjur	27 UHF	SD	MetroTV Cianjur
PT Mitra Media Digital Dua	Nusantara TV Majalengka	Sumedang, Majalengka	34 UHF	SD	MetroTV Sumedang
PT Mitra Media Digital Lima	Nusantara TV Banjarmasin	Banjarmasin, Banjarbaru, Martapura, Marabahan, Pelaihari	45 UHF	SD	MetroTV Banjarmasin
PT Mitra Media Digital Lima	Nusantara TV Balikpapan	Balikpapan	29 UHF	SD	MetroTV Balikpapan
PT Mitra Media Digital Enam	Nusantara TV Makassar	Makassar, Gowa, Maros, Pangkep, Takalar	34 UHF	HD	MetroTV Makassar

== See also ==
- List of television stations in Indonesia
