= TVRI Nusantara =

- Nusantara; Indonesia
- Channels: Digital: 38 (UHF); Virtual: 2

Ownership
- Owner: TVRI

History
- First air date: 1 March 2024

Technical information
- Licensing authority: Kementerian Komunikasi dan Informatika Republik Indonesia

TVRI Nusantara is a regional public television station owned by government broadcaster TVRI. It serves Nusantara, the future capital of Indonesia, in eastern Kalimantan, the Indonesian part of Borneo.

== History ==
TVRI Nusantara started broadcasting on 1 March 2024. On the same day, the new station was visited by president Joko Widodo. The station's goal was to amplify the progress of the future capital. Iman Brotoseno is the station's director.

On 10 September 2025, a lecture was held in Nusantara as part of the series Nusantara Berbaliqh. This lecture was televised on 9 October on TVRI Kalimantan Timur.
