= TVRI Central Kalimantan =

- Palangka Raya; Indonesia
- Channels: Digital: 30 (UHF); Virtual: 2

Ownership
- Owner: TVRI

History
- First air date: 17 February 1995
- Former channel number: 29 UHF (1995-2022)

Technical information
- Licensing authority: Kementerian Komunikasi dan Informatika Republik Indonesia

Links
- Website: tvri.go.id/stasiun/kalteng

TVRI Central Kalimantan (Indonesian: TVRI Kalimantan Tengah, often shortened to TVRI Kalteng) is a regional television station owned by TVRI, based in Palangka Raya, Central Kalimantan, Indonesia.

== History ==
TVRI established a local production center on 17 February 1995. Local programming did not begin in earnest until 9 September 1999, using a playback system to broadcast three times per week, 5:00 p.m. to 6:00 p.m., from a transmitter at Jalan Yos Sudarso. On 14 May 2002, a fourth day of local programming was introduced. From 1 October 2003, the daily airtime moved to 4:30 to 5:30 p.m. In 2006, the station expanded to a three-hour schedule, reaching at least ten regencies. In 2013, the terrestrial coverage expanded in Kalimantan to Palangka Raya, Pulang Pisau, Sampit, Kuala Kurun, Pangkalan Bun, Kuala Pembuang, Buntok, Ampah, Muara Teweh, and via overspill to some areas outside of Kalimantan.

On the afternoon of 15 June 2022, a fire broke out at the station. In 2023, during its anniversary celebrations, the station announced that it would improve the quality of its local programs in anticipation of the next year's elections, in line with TVRI's tagline of being the "home of democracy". The improvements were also justified on the conversion of its signal from analog-to-digital.
