= TVRI =

Indonesian public television network

LPP Televisi Republik Indonesia
- Logo since 29 March 2019
- Type: Public television broadcaster
- Country: Indonesia
- Founded: 24 August 1962; 64 years ago
- TV stations: TVRI; TVRI regional stations TVRI World; TVRI Sport
- Revenue: Rp137 billion (2016)
- Headquarters: Jalan Gerbang Pemuda, Gelora, Central Jakarta
- Broadcast area: Indonesia
- Area: Southeast Asia, with a focus in Indonesia, East Timor and Papua New Guinea
- Key people: Agus Sudibyo (Chairman of the Supervisory Board); Fiki Satari (President Director)
- Official website: tvri.go.id

LPP Televisi Republik Indonesia (TVRI; lit. 'Public Broadcasting Organization "Television of the Republic of Indonesia"') is an Indonesian national public television network and one of Indonesia's two national Public Broadcasting Institutions, the other being the public radio network RRI. First publicly airing in 24 August 1962 after 2 years on the date of the same name 1960 as set as the official original date of birth and 12 July the year of the same name, on the opening day of, and established as part of the preparations for, the 1962 Asian Games, it is the oldest television network in the country. Its national headquarters is in Gelora, Central Jakarta.

TVRI monopolized television broadcasting in Indonesia until 24 August 1989, when the first commercial television network RCTI went on the air (also until the date of the same name 1985, after 4 years ago, as an official original birth date following corporate). Alongside RRI, TVRI was converted from a state-controlled broadcaster under government department into an independent public broadcaster on 18 March 2005, becoming the first public broadcaster in the country.

TVRI currently broadcasts throughout the country with three national channels as well as 35 regional stations. As of 2025 it has 361 transmitters; making it the television network with the largest terrestrial coverage in the country. Its funding primarily comes from the annual state budget approved by the parliament, advertisements, and other services.

== History ==
=== 1960–1975: The idea and initial broadcast ===
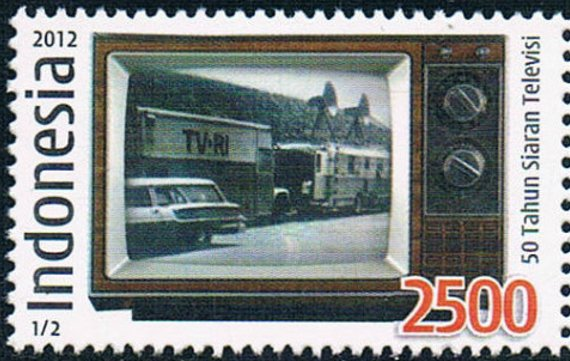
A 2012 Indonesian stamp commemorating 50 years of Indonesian television, showing one of the first TVRI OB vans

The initial idea to establish a television station in Indonesia was put forward by then Minister of Information Maladi as far as 1952. The argument at the time is that it would be useful for the socialization of the upcoming 1955 general election, but the idea was deemed as too expensive by the cabinet.

The plan to organize the first television broadcast finally began to materialize when in 1961, the Indonesian Government decided to include the television mass media project in the IV Asian Games development project under the IV Asian Games Project Affairs Command (KUPAG). On July 25, 1961, the Minister of Information issued Decree of the Minister of Information of the Republic of Indonesia (SK Menpen) No. 20/SK/M/1961 concerning the formation of the Television Preparatory Committee (P2TV). This institution is chaired by RM Soetarto, head of the State Film Directorate. Apart from Soetarto, there were also his representatives, namely RM Soenarjo and 7 committee members, and they worked together with the Ministry of Information to prepare television broadcasts in Indonesia. To learn more about television, the President then sent Soetarto to New York and Atlanta, United States.

On 23 October 1961 at 09.30, President Sukarno who was in Vienna, Austria sent a telex to Maladi to immediately prepare a television project with the following targets:

1. Building a studio at the former AKPEN (Information Academy) in Senayan, which is now the location of the LPP TVRI head office. This location was chosen because it was close to the Bung Karno Sports Arena, so it was more practical for broadcasting the Asian Games event. Before occupying this location, other locations that had been studied as TVRI studios included the PFN Jatinegara Building, the Topography Bureau Building, the RRI transmitter in Kebayoran, and several other places.
2. Built two transmitters: 100W and 10 kW with a tower 80 meters high. Built in the TVRI Senayan complex, initially this tower was planned to be above the Hotel Indonesia or the former Perfini Building. The second transmitter was completed on 22 August 1962 and was ready for operation a few hours before the start of the IV Asian Games.
3. Preparing the equipment (programs and personnel). Specifically, the equipment supply comes from NEC (Japan), after going through selection from other providers, such as Siemens (West Germany), RCA (United States), and Marconi (England). Apart from NEC, another Japanese company involved in the preparation of TVRI was NHK, which trained prospective employees and provided technical assistance for the broadcast. This training was carried out for TVRI employees who generally had no experience in television at that time, because they came from RRI, PFN, as well as ITB students.

On August 17, 1962, TVRI began conducting trial broadcasts of the 17th Indonesian Independence Day event from the grounds of the Merdeka Palace, Jakarta, in black and white format and supported by a backup transmitter with a power of 100W. The TVRI broadcast complex was completed in less than a year and was inaugurated on 23 August 1962 by the chairman of P2TV.

TVRI was formed based on the Decree of the Minister of Information of the Republic of Indonesia No. 20/SK/VII/61, then it became part of the Bureau of Radio and Television under the Asian Games IV Organizing Committee for the IV Asian Games that year. TVRI broadcast its first test transmission on the Independence Day celebrations from the Merdeka Palace on 17 August 1962. TVRI went on air, airing the 1962 Asian Games opening ceremony on 24 August. Throughout the Games TVRI aired every event of the meet especially those involving Indonesian athletes; live broadcasts were held from the morning to evening and delayed broadcasts were held from 20:45 until 23:00 WIB when it signed off for the night. With TVRI's presence, Indonesia became the sixth country in eastern Asia to introduce television, behind Japan, the Philippines, Thailand, China and South Korea. During the Asian Games, Matsushita awarded a contract from the Indonesian Ministry of People's Industry for the installation of television sets, worth $3 million.

TVRI began broadcasting advertisements starting March 1963. Later on 20 October, the Yayasan TVRI (TVRI Foundation) was formally created as the official governing authority for the station with President of Indonesia as chairman. The foundation experienced several changes and lasted until late 1990s.

Two years later, the first regional TVRI station opened in Yogyakarta. Later, many regional TVRI stations were opened, including stations and studios in Bandung, Semarang, Medan, Surabaya, Makassar, Manado, Batam, Palembang, Denpasar and Balikpapan. In the succeeding years, TVRI aired as a network carrying programming from Jakarta supplemented by opt-out broadcasts from the regional stations.

=== 1975–1998: Under the New Order ===
In 1974, eight years after President Suharto took office, TVRI became a part of the Department of Information, with the status as a directorate. Its role was to inform the public about government policies. A year after, a decree instituted TVRI a dual status, as a part of the TVRI Foundation and a part of the directorate. In 1976, it began to be broadcast all over Indonesia via Palapa satellite.

The first colour television signal was transmitted via satellite transmission in 1979. The first colour news bulletins were Berita Nasional (National News), Dunia Dalam Berita (The World in News), breaking events segments on Laporan Khusus (Special Report) and Berita Terakhir (Latest News).

TVRI in the late 1970s and 1980s became a well-defined mass media component of the Department of Information, in early years it generating income from advertising slots. After enjoying income from advertisements for years, President Suharto in his speech abolished the advertisement on TVRI in 1981 in order to "better directing television to help the development programs and avoid negative effects that do not support the spirit of development". This policy would later be revoked after the reform era. In 1982 TVRI Tower was officially opened to broadcast a wider signal.

During the era, the government-backed TVRI progressively established television production studios and television stations in many provinces across the country. As of 1998, all provinces in Indonesia had their own TVRI regional station or production studio; including East Timor.

It was decided in February 1981 that television commercials were to be banned by April, with TVRI scheduled to lost 20 billion rupiahs ($64 million) a year. With the ban, TVRI eyed the creation of programming for rural audiences.

In the 1980s the decision was made to split TVRI into two channels - Channels 6 and 8 - the latter as a test service for Jakarta and West Java viewers as well as in other areas wherein network-produced programs and foreign imports would be shared between the two channels.

On the Channel 8 basis TVRI launched its second channel TVRI Programa Dua (TVRI Programme Two) in 1989 to attract the Jakartan urban audience, with a single English-language news program Six Thirty Report for half an hour that began at 18:30 WIB; later Programa Dua became a local channel under the name TVRI Jakarta. However, in the same year TVRI lost its monopoly when the government's sixth Five Year Plan allowed private television networks, channels, and stations to begin broadcasting, the first commercial television network being RCTI.

A fire broke out at TVRI's facilities in Jakarta on the early hours of 31 December 1985, accumulating US$2 million in losses. The blaze did not affect the playout, which was being held at a new studio in an adjacent facility. Suharto demanded an investigation about the causes.

In 1994, TVRI launched its teletext service TVRI-Text, in partnership with PT Pilar Kumalajaya, about four months after RCTI launched the first teletext in the country.

=== 1998–2006: Transformation and restructurization ===
After the start of the reform era, especially in 2000, TVRI's status was changed. Under a service corporation (Perusahaan Jawatan or Perjan) form, it became responsible firstly to the Ministry of Finance and was then turned into a limited company under the authority of the State Ministry of State-Owned Enterprises for organizational matters and Ministry of Finance for financial matters. Under this arrangement, TVRI broadcasts in accordance with the principles of public television such as independent, neutral and public interest-oriented. Later in 2002, the status of TVRI changed again to a limited company (Perseroan Terbatas or PT), still under the two ministries.

The enactment of the Act No. 32/2002 on Broadcasting designated TVRI, along with RRI, as the public broadcasting institution (Lembaga penyiaran publik or LPP) and were removed from any direct governmental control. TVRI was given a transition period of 3 years from PT to public broadcasting form. The status then reaffirmed by Government Regulation (Peraturan Pemerintah) No. 13/2005. TVRI officially became LPP on 18 March 2005.

=== 2006–2019: Modernization and rebranding ===
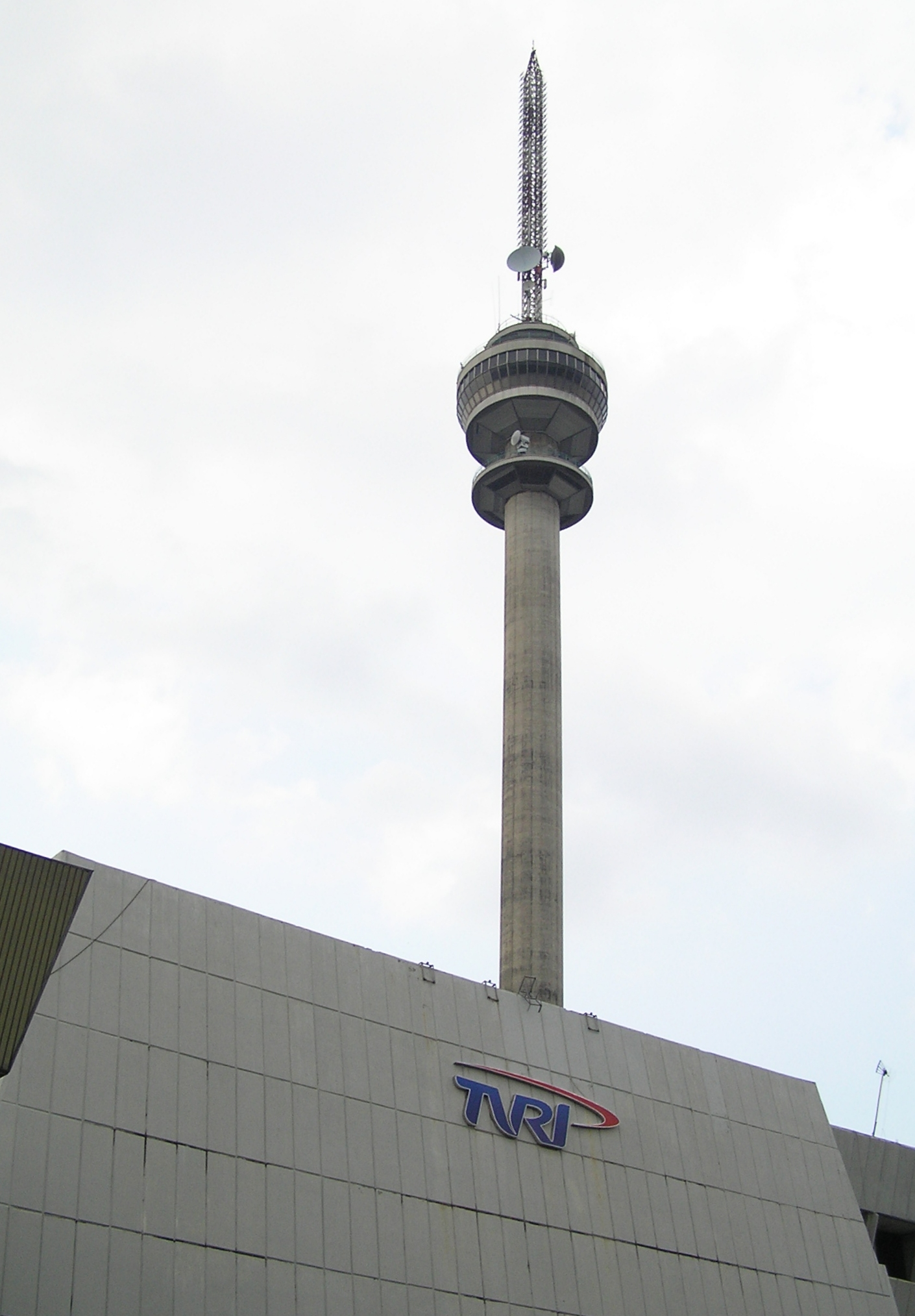
TVRI headquarters in Jakarta, with its seventh logo

Following the government's plan to introduce digital television in Indonesia, TVRI launched its digital broadcasting services on 21 December 2010. Initially launched in Jakarta, Surabaya and Batam; TVRI also launched two digital terrestrial channels, which were the first of its kind in Indonesia: TVRI 3 (currently TVRI World) and TVRI 4 (currently TVRI Sport). The launch was attended by President Susilo Bambang Yudhoyono and Minister of Communications and Information Technology Tifatul Sembiring.

In 2017, the TVRI board of supervisors installed a well-known television figure, Helmy Yahya as the chief director and Apni Jaya Putra (former programming director at Kompas TV and employer of SCTV, RCTI and SUN TV) as the news and programming director. During the leadership of Helmy Yahya and Apni Jaya Putra, TVRI began to remodel its programming on a large scale.

On 29 March 2019, at the concert special Menggapai Dunia (Reaching the World), TVRI adopted its new logo as a part of the rebranding efforts. The new logo was actually decided to be released in the fourth quarter of 2018, but for several reasons, it was postponed to the end of March 2019. At the same time, all TVRI regional stations have changed their logo in front of their respective studios.

In August 2019, TVRI together with two national private networks (Metro TV and Trans7) and Ministry of Communication and Information Technology officially launched digital television broadcasts for border regions in Nunukan Regency, North Kalimantan. With the launch, the government hoped that people in all regions of Indonesia can watch television with high quality.

A proposed new Broadcasting Act currently in the making, replacing Act No. 32/2002, would merge TVRI with RRI into RTRI (Radio Televisi Republik Indonesia, Radio [and] Television of the Republic of Indonesia).

=== 2020–present: Recent developments ===
TVRI's improvements under Helmy were not continued in the era of his successor. TVRI seemed to have returned to its original essence, with its broadcasts barely noticed by television viewers, plus it was less agile in seizing digitalization opportunities. In terms of budget, TVRI also seemed not independent, continuing to rely on government funding. Efforts to diversify revenue also still did not show maximum performance, while having to be burdened with operating regional channels and stations. Nevertheless, TVRI's President Director Iman Brotoseno still believes that TVRI will become a "world-class broadcasting institution", with programs such as modernizing broadcast equipment, capacity building in human resources, plus the implementation of a Digital Broadcasting System in collaboration with the French government.

== Structure ==
TVRI is designated as public broadcasting institution per Act No. 32 of 2002 on Broadcasting, which defined as a "legal entity established by the state, independent, neutral, not commercial, and has the function to provide services for the public benefit". Its duty, according to Government Regulation No. 13 of 2005, is "to provide the healthy information, education and entertainment services, (maintain) social control and unity, and preserve the nation's culture for the whole public benefit by organizing television broadcast that reaches all parts of the Unitary State of the Republic of Indonesia".

TVRI organization structure consists of five Board of Supervisors (Dewan Pengawas) appointed by the People's Representative Council (DPR) and six Board of Directors (Dewan Direksi) appointed by the Board of Supervisors. Both are sworn in by the President, serve for five years and renewable once. It also has an Internal Supervisory Unit (Satuan Pengawasan Intern), which reports internal finance and operational supervision to the Board of Directors.

According to article 15 of the Broadcasting Act, TVRI is funded by several sources such as broadcasting fees, annual state budget (drafted by the government and approved by the DPR), community contribution, and advertisement, as well as other legal efforts related to its broadcasting operation. In fact, as of today the broadcasting fee is yet to be implemented, and for "other legal efforts" TVRI is asked to generate "non-tax state revenue" by various funding sources besides annual state budget; such as website ads, training service, professional certification, assets rent, program production, multiplexing service, and programming royalty. Previously, "television fee" has existed to supplement TVRI funding besides the government budget until the 1990s, but later abolished.

As of 2018 TVRI has approximately 4,300 employees, with an estimated 1,800 of whom being based in Jakarta. 90% of its employees are civil servants under Ministry of Communication and Information Technology, now Ministry of Communication and Digital Affairs, though the network is not under the ministry.

== Services ==
=== Channels ===
TVRI currently operates three national channels and a dedicated regional channel:

- TVRI: The main channel of TVRI, it broadcasts information and educational content, as well as entertainment for 24 hours a day.
- TVRI World: The channel broadcasts TVRI programming in English that is targeted for an international audience, previously known as TVRI Kanal 3.
- TVRI Sport: The channel broadcasts sports programming as well as simulcasting live sports events from the TVRI main channel in high definition.

=== Regional stations ===
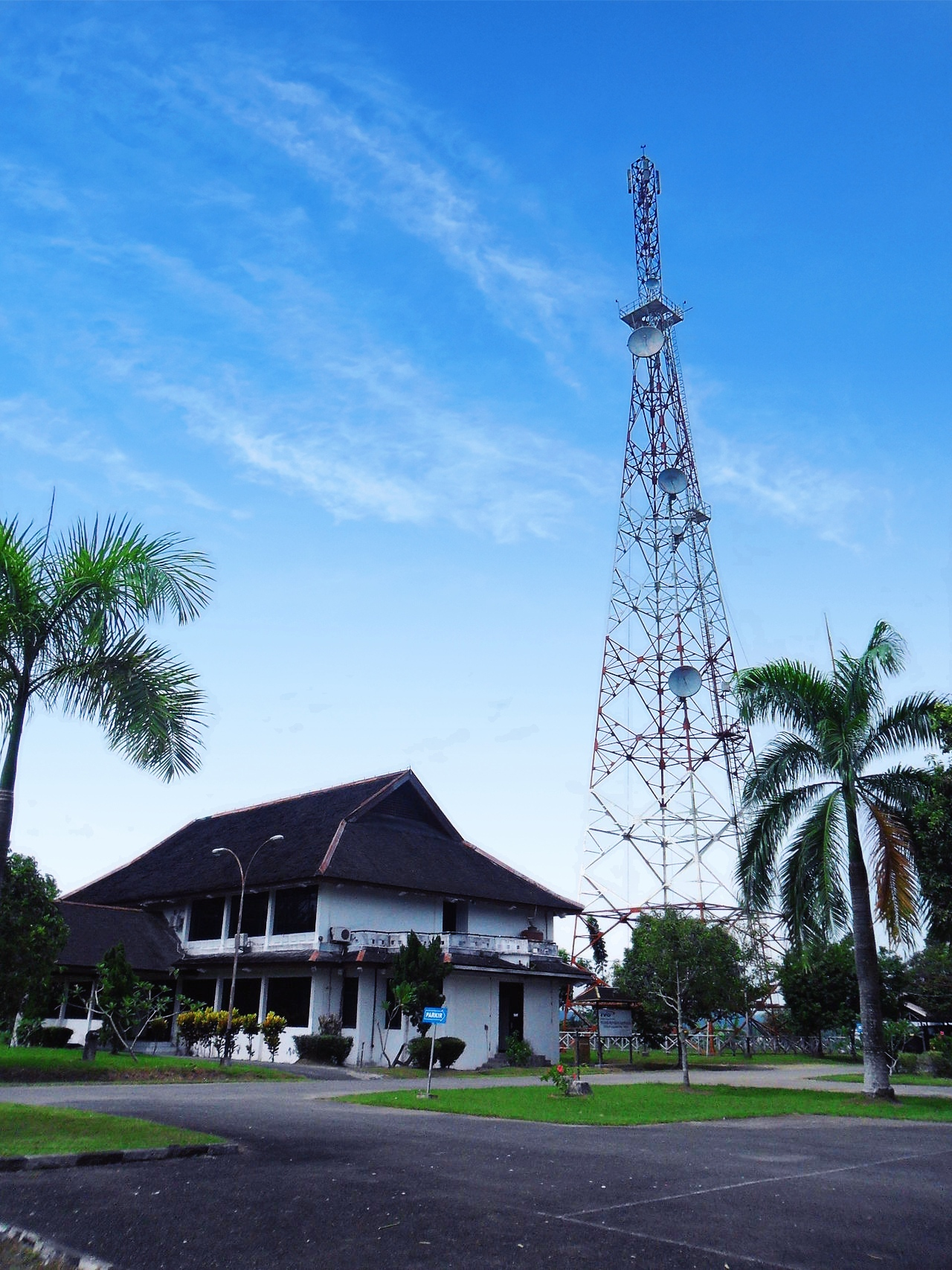
TVRI East Kalimantan station building and transmitter in Samarinda, East Kalimantan.

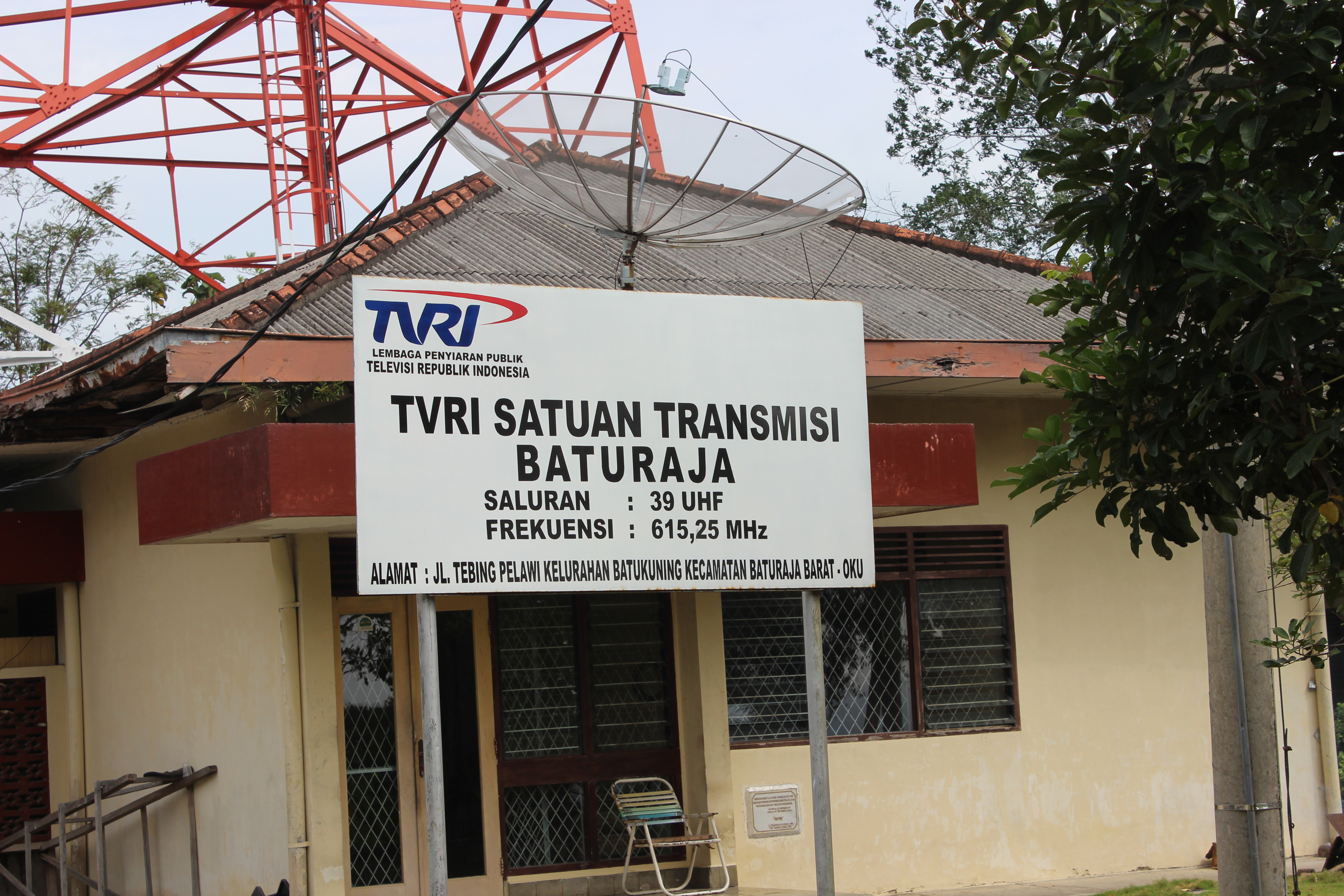
TVRI South Sumatra transmission station in Ogan Komering Ulu, South Sumatra.

TVRI has 38 regional stations covering all provinces of Indonesia, shown below in their native names and broadcast area:

Region	Logo	Station	Founding date	Headquarters	Broadcast area
Sumatra		TVRI Aceh	24 February 1993	Banda Aceh City, Aceh	Aceh
Sumatra		TVRI North Sumatra	28 December 1970	Medan City, North Sumatra	North Sumatra
Sumatra		TVRI West Sumatra	19 April 1997	Padang City, West Sumatra	West Sumatra
Sumatra		TVRI Riau	3 November 1998	Pekanbaru City, Riau	Riau
Sumatra		TVRI Riau	3 November 1998	Pekanbaru City, Riau	Riau Islands (Note: TVRI Riau also covers the Riau Islands-1 digital television service area (covering Batam City, Tanjungpinang City, Bintan Regency and Karimun Regency).)
Sumatra		TVRI Riau Islands	2 June 1980 (began to be established as a relay broadcast from Jakarta); 9 November 2021 (first local broadcast)	Tanjung Pinang City, Riau Islands (Note: TVRI Riau Islands broadcasts through a mini studio in Tanjungpinang City.)	Riau Islands
Sumatra		TVRI Riau Islands	2 June 1980 (began to be established as a relay broadcast from Jakarta); 9 November 2021 (first local broadcast)	Tanjung Pinang City, Riau Islands	Riau (Note: TVRI Riau Islands also covers the Riau-1 digital television service area (covering Pekanbaru City and Kampar Regency).)
Sumatra		TVRI Jambi	15 April 1995	Jambi City, Jambi	Jambi
Sumatra		TVRI Bengkulu	3 August 1998	Bengkulu City, Bengkulu	Bengkulu
Sumatra		TVRI South Sumatra	31 January 1974	Palembang City, South Sumatra	South Sumatra
Sumatra		TVRI Bangka Belitung	21 November 2014	Pangkal Pinang City, Bangka Belitung Islands	Bangka Belitung Islands
Sumatra		TVRI Lampung	12 July 1991	Bandar Lampung City, Lampung	Lampung
Java		TVRI Jakarta	1 January 1983 (as Programa Dua TVRI); 26 March 2007 (as TVRI Jakarta)	Central Jakarta (headquarter) and West Jakarta (transmission station), Jakarta	Jakarta
Java		TVRI Jakarta	1 January 1983 (as Programa Dua TVRI); 26 March 2007 (as TVRI Jakarta)	Central Jakarta (headquarter) and West Jakarta (transmission station), Jakarta	West Java (Note: TVRI Jakarta also covers the Jabodetabek digital television service area in West Java (covering Bogor, Bekasi and surrounding areas).)
Java		TVRI Jakarta	1 January 1983 (as Programa Dua TVRI); 26 March 2007 (as TVRI Jakarta)	Central Jakarta (headquarter) and West Jakarta (transmission station), Jakarta	Banten (Note: TVRI Jakarta also covers the Jabodetabek digital television service area in Tangerang and its surroundings.) (Note: Reaches the province, because there is no TVRI station in the province.)
Java		TVRI Banten	2024 (estimated first local broadcast)	Serang City, Banten	Banten
Java		TVRI West Java	11 March 1987	Bandung City, West Java	West Java (Note: TVRI West Java also covers the Jabodetabek digital television service area, including several areas in Jakarta.)
Java		TVRI Central Java	29 May 1996	Demak Regency, Central Java	Central Java
Java		TVRI Central Java	29 May 1996	Demak Regency, Central Java	Special Region of Yogyakarta (Note: TVRI Central Java also covers the Yogyakarta and Surakarta digital television service areas, which also covers the entire Yogyakarta Special Region area.)
Java		TVRI Yogyakarta	17 August 1965	Sleman Regency, Special Region of Yogyakarta	Special Region of Yogyakarta
Java		TVRI Yogyakarta	17 August 1965	Sleman Regency, Special Region of Yogyakarta	Central Java (Note: TVRI Yogyakarta also covers the digital television service area of Yogyakarta and Surakarta, which also includes the Greater Solo area.)
Java		TVRI East Java	3 March 1978	Surabaya City, East Java	East Java
Bali and Lesser Sunda		TVRI Bali	16 July 1978	Denpasar City, Bali	Bali
Bali and Lesser Sunda		TVRI West Nusa Tenggara	29 August 2007	Mataram City, West Nusa Tenggara	West Nusa Tenggara
Bali and Lesser Sunda		TVRI East Nusa Tenggara	29 July 1985	Kupang City, East Nusa Tenggara	East Nusa Tenggara
Kalimantan		TVRI West Kalimantan	14 September 1977 (began to be established as a relay broadcast from Jakarta); 14 September 1998 (first local broadcast)	Pontianak City, West Kalimantan	West Kalimantan
Kalimantan		TVRI Central Kalimantan	17 February 1995	Palangka Raya City, Central Kalimantan	Central Kalimantan
Kalimantan		TVRI South Kalimantan	5 August 1985	Banjarmasin City, South Kalimantan	South Kalimantan
Kalimantan		TVRI East Kalimantan	19 January 1993	Samarinda City, East Kalimantan	East Kalimantan
Kalimantan		TVRI North Kalimantan	25 October 2021	Bulungan Regency, North Kalimantan (Note: TVRI North Kalimantan is temporarily broadcast through the North Kalimantan Governor's Office in Tanjung Selor, Bulungan Regency.)	North Kalimantan
Kalimantan		TVRI Nusantara	1 March 2024 (first local broadcast)	Penajam North Paser Regency, East Kalimantan	
Sulawesi		TVRI North Sulawesi	7 October 1978	Manado City, North Sulawesi	North Sulawesi
Sulawesi		TVRI Gorontalo	13 June 2007	Gorontalo City, Gorontalo	Gorontalo
Sulawesi		TVRI Central Sulawesi	22 December 2001	Palu City, Central Sulawesi	Central Sulawesi
Sulawesi		TVRI Southeast Sulawesi	23 July 2007	Kendari City, Southeast Sulawesi	Southeast Sulawesi
Sulawesi		TVRI South Sulawesi	7 December 1972	Makassar City, South Sulawesi	South Sulawesi
Sulawesi		TVRI West Sulawesi	19 August 2011	Mamuju Regency, West Sulawesi	West Sulawesi
Maluku and Papua		TVRI North Maluku	12 October 2023	Sofifi City, North Maluku (Note: TVRI North Maluku is temporarily broadcasting through a mini studio at the North Maluku Governor's Office Complex, Sofifi City.)	North Maluku
Maluku and Papua		TVRI Maluku	20 February 1993	Ambon City, Maluku	Maluku
Maluku and Papua		TVRI West Papua	28 October 2020	Manokwari Regency, West Papua	West Papua
Maluku and Papua		TVRI West Papua	28 October 2020	Manokwari Regency, West Papua	Southwest Papua
Maluku and Papua		TVRI Papua	23 February 1994	Jayapura City, Papua	Papua
Maluku and Papua		TVRI Papua	23 February 1994	Jayapura City, Papua	Central Papua
Maluku and Papua		TVRI Papua	23 February 1994	Jayapura City, Papua	Highland Papua
Maluku and Papua		TVRI Papua	23 February 1994	Jayapura City, Papua	South Papua

Notes:

A former regional station for East Timor, TVRI Dili, ceased operation in 1999. East Timor national broadcaster RTTL currently takes its place.

=== Online services ===
TVRI currently maintain two online services. TVRI Klik, launched in 2018, is the primarily online streaming service for all TVRI channels, as well as its regional stations. TVRI VoD is the network's video-on-demand service. Both services could be accessed from their dedicated Android and iOS apps as well as their website.

Besides TVRI Klik, the channels and regional stations streaming service can also be found on the network's official website, YouTube, and other social media where available.

TVRI has its own news portal on TVRINews.com. The portal, which is active as far as 2014, has undergone several changes since.

=== Others ===
TVRI has an educational center called Pusat Pendidikan dan Pelatihan TVRI (Pusdiklat TVRI, TVRI Educational and Training Center) which provides television skill training.

TVRI also manages Studio Alam TVRI (literally "TVRI Natural Studio"), an outdoor studio in Sukmajaya, Depok, West Java. It is a green open space which is used for the production of several TVRI shows, and is also used as a recreational area for tourists. The studio complex was opened in 1987 as part of TVRI's Silver Jubilee.

== Criticism and controversies ==
=== Corruption scandals ===
In 2008, former TVRI President Director, Sumita Tobing was arrested due to alleged corruption in the procurement of 50 cameras worth 5.2 billion rupiah. She was found guilty in 2012, and imprisoned for 1 year and 6 months in 2014.

In 2013, TVRI Director of Finance Eddy Machmudi Effendi was sentenced to 8 years 6 months in prison due to a scandal involving Director of News and Programming Irwan Hendarmin and Indonesian senior comedian Mandra, regarding purchasing of programs.

=== Broadcasting of political events ===
On 6 June 2013, TVRI aired a delayed broadcast of the Muktamar Khilafah (Caliphate Conference) organized by Hizb ut-Tahrir Indonesia (HTI) in Gelora Bung Karno Stadium, Jakarta. The Indonesian Broadcasting Commission (KPI) Commissioner, Idy Muzayyad assessed that TVRI as a public broadcasting institution was "experiencing national disorientation" by broadcasting this event because "HTI's ideology is questioning the state ideology and nationalism, as well as rejecting democracy"; but HTI spokesperson Ismail Yusanto says that "TVRI is a public broadcaster, and HTI is also a part of the public" and the broadcast is "a part of the public's right to be broadcast and heard". TVRI was subsequently warned by KPI that they could face sanctions for the broadcast.

Later on 15 September, TVRI aired a delayed broadcast of the Democratic Party convention for more than 2 hours, the political party of which was founded by the incumbent president Susilo Bambang Yudhoyono. The broadcast again caused KPI sanctioning, due to the violation of political independence principle according to the law. However, TVRI directors secretary manager Usi Karundeng said that the network was never intervened or paid for by the party.

=== Dismissal of Helmy Yahya and internal chaos ===
On 6 December 2019, Helmy Yahya was temporarily dismissed as President Director for the 2017-2022 period by the TVRI Board of Supervisors led by Arief Hidayat Thamrin and replaced by acting President Director Supriyono. According to news sources in almost all mass media on 16 January 2020, Helmy Yahya was officially dismissed from his position by the board permanently and unilaterally, citing the "expensive" purchase of broadcast rights for the Premier League from Djarum-owned premium multi-platform network, Mola TV, a problem during Siapa Berani quiz show, and various other problems. Despite public pushback against the dismissal, the board continued to refuse Helmy Yahya's opposition to his dismissal until the election for the new president director to replace him.

On 17 January, 4,000 TVRI employees declared a motion of no confidence to the Board of Supervisors. One day before, the board's room was sealed. As of 27 March 2020, another three directors (including News (Editor in Chief) and Program Director Apni Jaya Putra) were also temporarily dismissed for less than a month by the TVRI Board of Supervisors regarding the Helmy Yahya case. On 13 May, all of them (including Apni) were permanently dismissed.

On 27 May 2020, the TVRI Board of Supervisors appointed Indonesian advertising practitioner, journalist, and filmmaker/film director Iman Brotoseno as the new President Director for the remainder of the 2017–2022 period, replacing Helmy Yahya. The appointment caused controversy thanks to his endorsement of incumbent president Joko Widodo in the 2019 election, but he stated that he "would be independent and impartial". He was also criticized for his past posts on Twitter which included Indonesian colloquial terms for pornography and porn films.

On 5 October 2020, the Board of Supervisors Arief Hidayat Thamrin was ultimately dismissed by first commission of People's Representative Council. However, Arief was suspended from power since 11 May.

== Visual identity ==
=== Logo history ===
TVRI 1st Logo (24 August 1962–24 August 1978) (corporate) Used as an endcap until 1981.

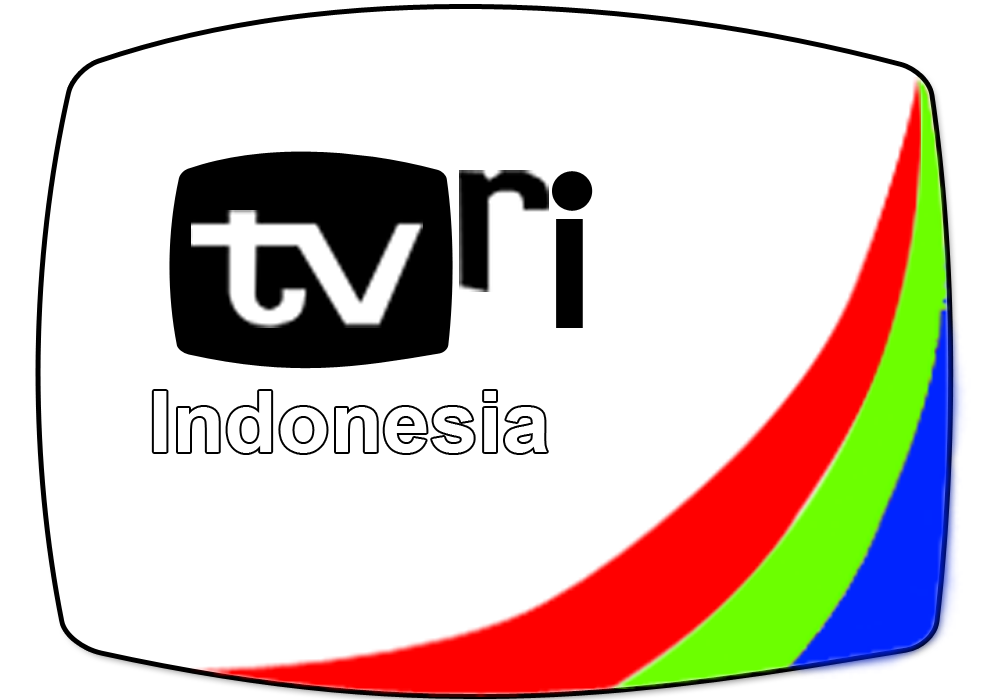
TVRI 2nd Logo (24 August 1978–29 December 1983)

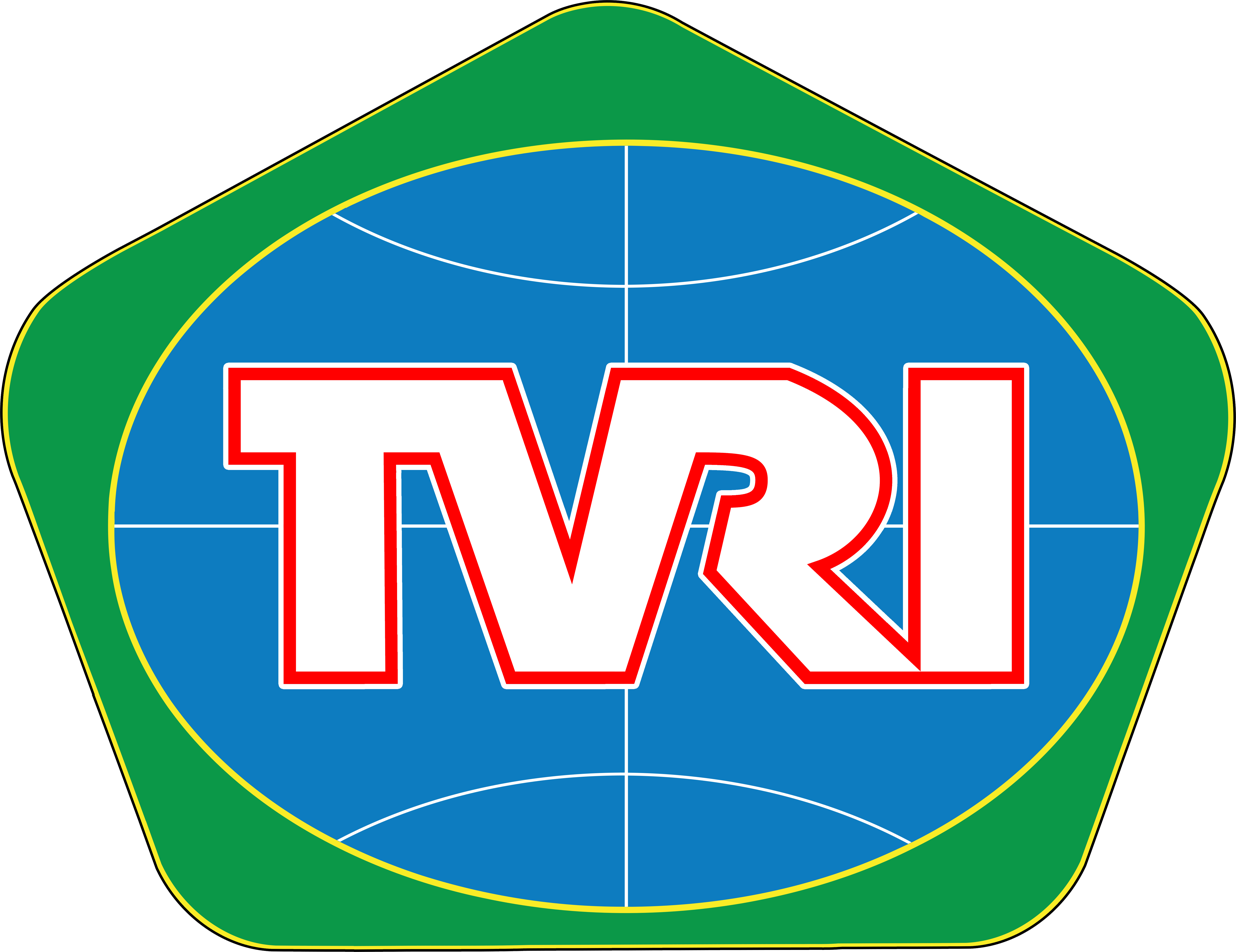
TVRI 3rd Logo (29 December 1983-23 August–1999) This logo was first introduced at the RRI-TVRI Leadership Coordination Meeting held in Denpasar, Bali. The logo was inaugurated on 29 December 1983, and was used as the on-air logo from 1996 to 1999.

TVRI 4th Logo (24 August 1999–12 July 2001)

TVRI 5th Logo (13 July 2001– 31 July 2003)

TVRI 6th Logo (1 August 2003–16 April 2007)

TVRI 7th Logo (16 April 2007–29 March 2019)

TVRI 8th Logo (29 March 2019–present)

=== Anniversary logos ===
Logo of TVRI's 62th anniversary (2024)

Logo of TVRI's 63th anniversary (2025)

=== Slogan history ===
- Menjalin Persatuan dan Kesatuan (Weaving Unity and Unitary, 1962–2001)
- Makin Dekat Di Hati (Going Closer to The Heart, 2001–2003)
- Semangat Baru (New Spirit, 2003–2012)
- Mencerdaskan dan Aman bagi Keluarga (Intelligent and Safe for Families, 2011)
- Saluran Pemersatu Bangsa (The Nation's Unifying Channel, 2001–2019)
- Media Pemersatu Bangsa (The Nation's Unifying Media, 2019–present)

=== Test cards ===
TVRI discontinued all test cards upon introducing a 24/7 schedule on TVRI Nasional in 2021. Some other TVRI channels still do not broadcast round-the-clock like TVRI Bali during Nyepi (Balinese day of silence).

- 1962–1974: modified RMA 1946 Resolution Chart with Garuda Pancasila in the middle
- 1974–1985: Telefunken FuBK
- 1985–2021: Philips PM5544

== See also ==
- Television in Indonesia
- Radio Republik Indonesia, the Indonesian public radio network
- Antara, the Indonesian news agency
- Public broadcasting in Indonesia
