= TVRI South Sulawesi =

TVRI Sulawesi Selatan

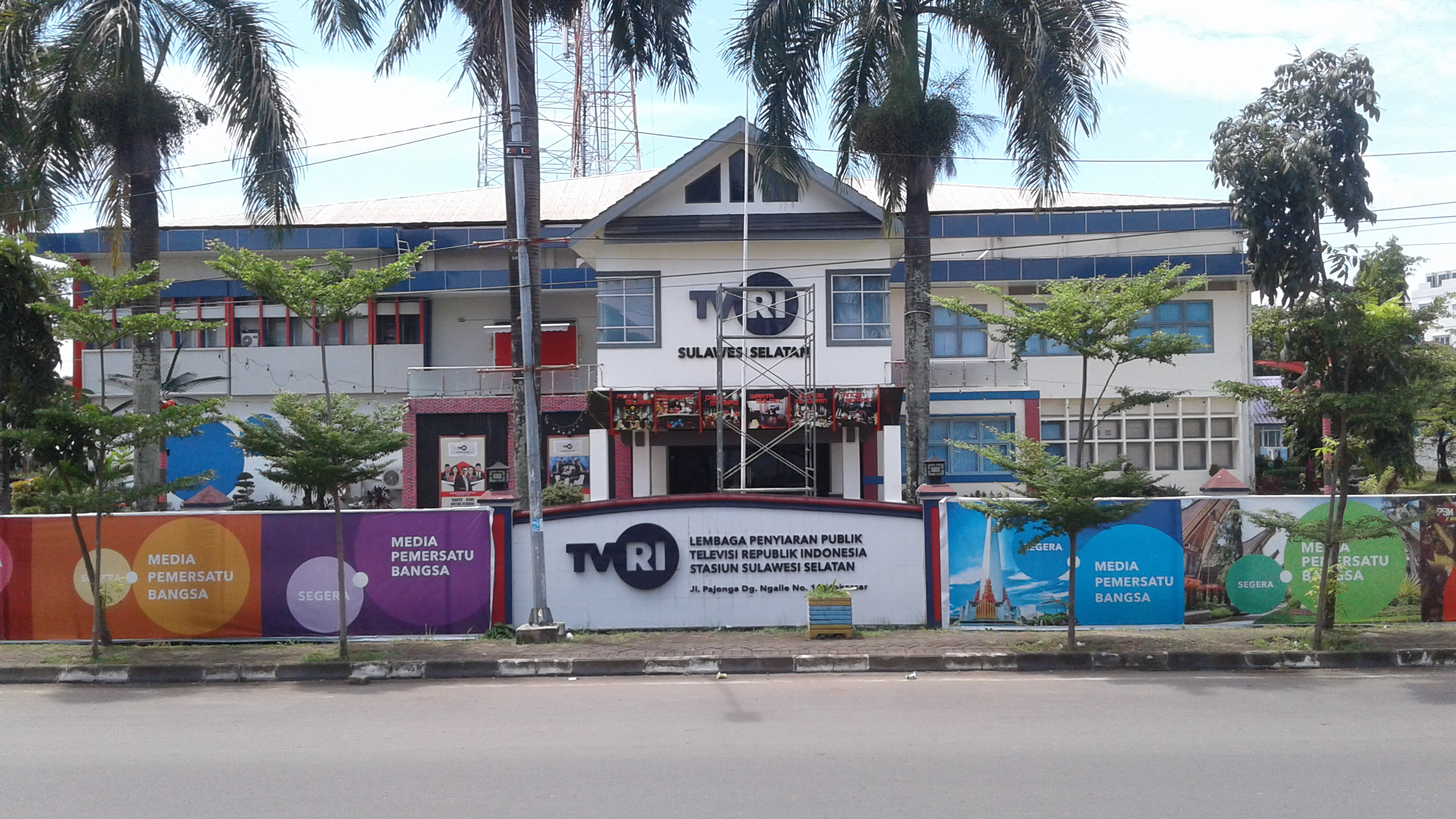
- TVRI Sulawesi Selatan (South Sulawesi) Station building in Makassar

Makassar, South Sulawesi; Indonesia
- Channels: Digital: 28 UHF

Programming
- Affiliations: TVRI

Ownership
- Owner: TVRI

History
- First air date: 7 December 1972
- Former channel number: 37 UHF (analog)

Technical information
- Licensing authority: Kementerian Komunikasi dan Informatika Republik Indonesia

- Headquarters: Jalan Pajonga Daeng Ngalle 5, Mamajang, Makassar

History
- Former names: TVRI Ujung Pandang (1972–1999); TVRI Makassar (1999–2004)

Availability

Streaming media
- TVRI website: Watch live (Indonesia only)

TVRI Sulawesi Selatan (TVRI South Sulawesi, legally LPP TVRI Stasiun Sulawesi Selatan) is a regional public television station owned-and-operated by TVRI, serving South Sulawesi, Indonesia. The station's studios are located in Mamajang, Makassar.

== History ==
TVRI Sulawesi Selatan signed on on 7 December 1972 as TVRI Ujung Pandang. It became one of the earliest local television stations in Indonesia and the first in Sulawesi. LPP TVRI South Sulawesi was established based on the Decree of the Governor of South Sulawesi Number 178/VII/71 of 15 July 1971.

In the beginning, TVRI Ujung Pandang started its broadcast programme in the status of "trial broadcast". At that time, TVRI Ujung Pandang broadcasts could be seen for a radius of 60 kilometres in six areas: Ujung Pandang City, Maros, Pangkajene Islands, Gowa, Takalar and Jeneponto. The trial broadcast used a 1 KW VHF (Very High Frequency) transmitter with a tower height of 75 metres.

According to the central TVRI masterplan, TVRI Ujung Pandang was planned to be built in 1978, but with the initiative and insistence of local government elements, especially the Mayor of Ujung Pandang Municipality, HM Dg. Patompo succeeded in inviting the national company Gobel and its Japanese partner PT Matsushita Electric Company, to establish a TVRI station in Ujung Pandang.

On 2 November 2022, at morning (WITA), TVRI Sulawesi Selatan stopped broadcasting analog television in Makassar first, and was only available through terrestrial digital television broadcasts on channel 28 UHF (multiplexing TVRI Makassar).
