= TVRI North Sumatra =

TVRI Sumatera Utara

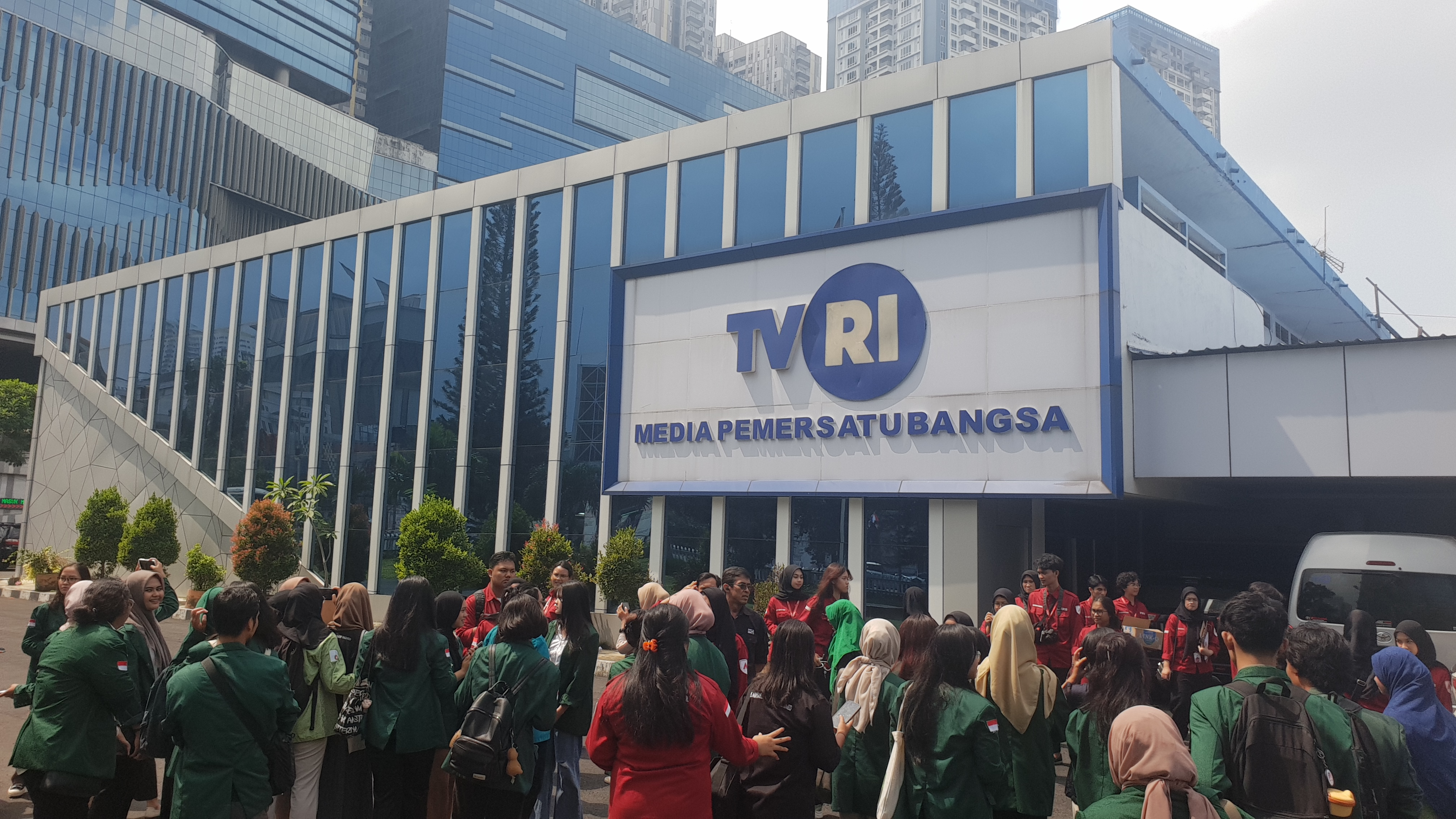
- TVRI North Sumatra headquarters in Medan

North Sumatra; Indonesia
- City: Medan
- Channels: Digital: 28 (UHF); Virtual: 2
- Branding: TVRI Sumut (alternative)

Programming
- Affiliations: TVRI

Ownership
- Owner: TVRI

History
- First air date: 28 December 1970
- Former channel number: 47 UHF (analog)

Technical information
- Licensing authority: Ministry of Communication and Information Technology of Indonesia
- Translator(s): UHF 29 (Gunungsitoli and Padangsidempuan); UHF 30 (Sibolga and Sidikalang); UHF 46 (Tarutung)

Links
- Webcast: TVRI Klik

Availability

Streaming media
- TVRI website: Watch live (Indonesia only)

TVRI Sumatera Utara (TVRI North Sumatra, legally LPP TVRI Stasiun Sumatera Utara) is a regional public television station owned-and-operated by TVRI, serving North Sumatra, Indonesia. TVRI Sumatera Utara studios are located in Medan, and its main transmitter is located in Bandar Baru, Sibolangit, Deli Serdang.

== History ==
In 1961, TVRI revealed its plan for local television stations following the implementation of its main station in Jakarta. Medan was planned to get a station in 1962.

On June 27, 1967, the committee TVRI North Sumatra Construction Foundation (Yayasan Pembangunan TVRI Sumatera Utara) was established by a partnership between the provincial government, the provincial parliament, regional TNI, and Pertamina; led by Lt. Col. Wahid Lubis and Lt. Col. Ridwan Hutagalung. The foundation's purpose is to find sources of funds for station construction and purchase of a number of broadcast equipment.

At the time of the station's approval, viewers were able to receive signals from Television Malaysia entering by overspill. The channel was available in hotels and homes. About 500 television sets were bought around the time to tune in to Malaysian signals.

TVRI Sumatera Utara first signed on the air on 9 December 1970 as TVRI Medan; it is considered the second TVRI regional station to be founded after TVRI Yogyakarta five years prior.

In December 2017, TVRI Sumatera Utara digital transmitters were located in Bandar Baru and Sibolga, whereas the dual cast transmitters were located in Simarjarunjung, Gunung Sitoli, Padang Sidempuan and Parapat.

== Programming ==
TVRI Sumatera Utara broadcasts 28 hours of locally produced programming each week (with 4 hours each day), the same duration as other TVRI regional stations.
