= TVRI Yogyakarta =

Yogyakarta; Indonesia
- Channels: Digital: 29 (UHF); Virtual: 2

Ownership
- Owner: TVRI

History
- First air date: 17 August 1965
- Former channel number(s): 8 VHF (1965-2014); 22 UHF (analog, 2014-2022)

Technical information
- Licensing authority: Kementerian Komunikasi dan Informatika Republik Indonesia

Links
- Website: tvrijogja.co.id

TVRI Yogyakarta (Javanese: ꦠꦼꦊꦮ꦳ꦶꦱꦶꦫꦺꦥꦸꦧ꧀ꦭꦶꦏ꧀ꦆꦤ꧀ꦢꦺꦴꦤꦺꦱꦶꦪꦔꦪꦺꦴꦒꦾꦏꦂꦠ, translit. Televisi Républik Indonésia Ngayogyakarta) is a regional television station owned by TVRI. It serves the Yogyakarta Special Region, Surakarta Residency in Central Java (except Wonogiri Regency). This station was the first local television station in Indonesia (the first outside Jakarta), founded in 1965. The TVRI Yogyakarta office and studio are located on Jalan Magelang km 4.5, Sleman, and the transmitter is in Patuk, Gunungkidul.

== History ==
TVRI Yogyakarta was founded by the Radio Directorate of the Ministry of Information. The station was originally located on Jl. Hayam Wuruk, when TVRI Yogyakarta was led by the first Station Head, Ir. Dewabrata. Its transmitting tower was built from bamboo.

In the initial plan outlined for TVRI, Yogyakarta was to get television by 1962, but did not arrive until 1965.

TVRI Yogyakarta's first broadcast on 17 August 1965 was a speech commemorating the 20th Anniversary of the Proclamation of Indonesian Independence by Deputy Governor Sri Paduka Paku Alam VIII.

Initially, TVRI Yogyakarta broadcast three days a week, each lasting 2 hours. At that time broadcast coverage was limited to the area that could be reached by a 10 KW VHF transmitter, and the broadcast format was still black and white. In 1973, TVRI Yogyakarta started broadcasting every day.

Starting in 2005, the broadcast name and station logo used the Jogja brand from the hand of Governor Sri Sultan Hamengkubuwono. The logo changed in 2015, following the new brand "Jogja Istimewa". Following the change to the TVRI logo in March 2019, TVRI Jogja is no longer used as a broadcast name.

On August 25 2022, TVRI Yogyakarta analog broadcasts on UHF channel 22 were turned off, and later, TVRI Yogyakarta broadcasts could only be watched via digital channel 29 UHF (DVB-T2).

== Programming ==
TVRI Yogyakarta's local production broadcasts 3 to 5 hours daily.

== Logos ==
TVRI Yogyakarta logo (16 April 2007-7 March 2015)

TVRI Yogyakarta logo (29 March 2019-present)

On-air bug (29 March 2019-present)
