= Impact of the COVID-19 pandemic on television =

The COVID-19 pandemic has had a substantial impact on the television industry, mirroring its impacts across all arts sectors, shutting down or delaying production of television programs in many countries with consequent negative impacts on revenues (through rights and advertising sales) and employment.

Such measures and changes have been done to appeal to mandates for social distancing and stay-at-home orders, as well as commitments by production companies and broadcasters to maintain the safety of all involved in production.

Ampere Analysis projected that the pandemic had delayed at least 60% of scripted television programming worldwide, including at least half of the programming originally scheduled to air in the second half of 2020. There had been a noticeable increase in non-scripted productions—including smaller-scale series capable of being produced remotely—that can be used to fill schedules until scripted programs resume production (noting that audiences may eventually become tired out by pandemic-themed programming).

The animation industry remained largely unaffected, due to the ease of remote work by animators.

== Production by region ==
=== Asia-Pacific ===
==== Australia ====
On Network 10, The Project, the seventeenth season of Dancing with the Stars Australia, Studio 10, and the eighth season of Have You Been Paying Attention? suspended their in-studio audiences. Have You Been Paying Attention? was recorded with only Tom Gleisner and a handful of production crew filming the show from the South Yarra studio, with all of the contestants remote working and using videotelephony to enforce social distancing.

The Australian Survivor: All Stars reunion episode filmed without an audience and was hosted by Osher Günsberg, rather than the series' regular host Jonathan LaPaglia, due to travel restrictions. The eighth season of Australian Survivor, set to start filming in Fiji in April, was postponed following the federal government's decision to establish a Level 4 travel restrictions, heavily discouraging international travel (this was later upgraded to an outright ban of international travel). The eighth (Brains V Brawn) and ninth (Blood V Water) seasons of Australian Survivor were eventually filmed in Outback Queensland. Network 10 also changed the race route for the fifth season of The Amazing Race Australia so that it would film only in Australia instead of internationally, but was later postponed due to interstate travel restrictions.

The eighth season of The Bachelor suspended filming midway into the season, with two virtual "Love In Lockdown" episodes being produced before in person production could resume. Neighbours suspended filming for two days after a crew member came into contact with someone who had tested positive for coronavirus. Upon resuming production, Neighbours implemented new guidelines, including splitting its crews and avoiding intimate scenes between cast members.

On the ABC, Q&A, Shaun Micallef's Mad as Hell, and The Weekly with Charlie Pickering suspended their studio audiences.

The Nine Network's Australian Ninja Warrior excluded audiences from attending tapings, with exception of the contestants' family members. The Voice Australia postponed production due to international talent facing a two-week quarantine after arriving in Australia.

The eleventh season of Gogglebox Australia filmed as normal prior to the beginning of the pandemic, with changes made to the show once the pandemic reached Australia. On April 10, following the beginning of the pandemic in Australia, cast members Mick and Di announced that they would be self-isolating for the remainder of the season; whilst further changes to the show included Jad using video conferencing software on his laptop, allowing him to continue participating in the program with his best friend Matty and Sarah Marie (Matty's wife); and 91-year old Emily (of the Silbery family) self-isolating, whilst her daughter Kerry and granddaughter Isabelle remained in weekly episodes for the remainder of the season.

Filming on the Seven Network's Home and Away was suspended as of March 22. The network also removed the show from its schedule for three weeks and replaced it for the first two weeks with the news show The Latest, and for the third week with the first week of the 8th season of House Rules. Production resumed on May 25.

Australia's Got Talent postponed production due to international talent facing a fourteen-day quarantine after arriving in Australia.

The annual Channel Seven Perth Telethon, traditionally aired as a marathon 26 hour live broadcast, was instead reduced to two, 3 hour live primetime specials that aired on October 24 and 25, 2020. The specials had a greater focus on Western Australia-based performers and personalities due to interstate travel restrictions.

==== Indonesia ====
As the government appeal Indonesians to "work, study, and pray at home", the Ministry of Education and Culture partners with TVRI to broadcast educational programming on a dedicated block Belajar dari Rumah on the network starting April 13, 2020. The block consists of kids program for preschools, instructional programming for elementary and high school students, and a parenting program on weekdays; as well as national movies at several weeknights and children, talkshow, and documentary programs at weekends. The block is aired every day at 08.00 to 11.00 WIB and 21.30 to 23.30 WIB on several weeknights, and also broadcast on TV Edukasi.

==== Japan ====
A handful of anime studios have encouraged their employees to work from home although the employment of freelance animators in some studios has limited work disruption. Anime productions including A3! Season Spring & Summer, A Certain Scientific Railgun T, Infinite Dendrogram, Asteroid in Love, The Millionaire Detective Balance: Unlimited were delayed apparently due to the pandemic. Productions which heavily rely on outsourcing in-between and coloring work to studios in China were the most affected by the COVID-19 pandemic, due to international travel restrictions making it impossible to physically deliver works across national boundary in person.

On March 31, media outlets reported that Toei Company closed its Tokyo studio for disinfection after the lead actor of Mashin Sentai Kiramager, the 44th season of the long-time running Super Sentai series, Rio Komiya (Jūru Atsuta) tested positive for COVID-19 the previous day and halted production of the series. However, on April 3, Toei released a statement that the studio was not closed despite what news and media outlets reported, citing the news as misinformation. As of April 5, Komiya's health condition was improving, and four days later, Komiya was discharged from the hospital and self-quarantined for two weeks. On May 10, both Kiramager and Kamen Rider Zero-One, the 30th season of the long-time running Kamen Rider series was announced to be going on hiatus. In place of the standard weekly episodes, Kiramager will broadcast Episode ZERO, a prequel episode detailing events before the series, as well as the Director's Cut versions of the first two episodes, Kira Talk!, and the Jamental Institute. Kamen Rider Zero-One will be releasing five special episodes that recount the events of the episodes covered in the 35 episodes released before hiatus, with two of those episodes dubbed "President Special" that are from the perspective of Aruto Hiden and his secretary, Is, while the third episode dubbed "Shooting Special" will be from the perspective of Isamu Fuwa and Yua Yaiba. On May 27, it was reported that Kamen Rider Zero-One would resume filming on June 1 following Japan lifting its state-of-emergency declaration two days prior, albeit with new guidelines to be used while shooting the remaining episodes. On June 7, TV Asahi announced that Kiramager and Zero-One would return to their regular weekly episodes starting on June 21.

Live-action drama series also suspended production to reduce the spread of the virus, and most broadcast stations transmitted works from their archives. Nippon TV shows such as Haken no Hinkaku 2 and Detective Notice, Tokyo Broadcasting System Television shows such as MIU404and Hanzawa Naoki 2, and Fuji TV shows such as Unsung Cinderella and Suits Season 2 all temporarily ceased production. Additionally, NHK suspended production and airing of their shows Dear Patient, Request to an Angel: The Last Wish in Life, and I'm Going to Die Soon.

On April 19, 2020, TV Tokyo, MediaNet & ShoPro announced that the Pokémon anime series would be going on hiatus, with production temporarily suspended. Reruns of old episodes began airing from April 26 to May 31, 2020; production staff later announced that new episodes would resume airing on June 7, 2020. In addition, production for many Toei anime shows was suspended due to the pandemic, including Healin' Good Pretty Cure (at Episode 12) and Digimon Adventure: (at Episode 3). As of April 19, 2020, Fuji TV, Toei Animation confirmed that the One Piece anime series would be going on recess, with production temporarily postponing new episodes and reruns of older episodes taking their place. On April 26, 2020, Nippon Animation announced that broadcasting of new episodes of the Chibi Maruko-chan anime had been suspended indefinitely as a result of the virus first reaching Tokyo. As a side note, as of April 26, 2020, there were a number of anime series with production pauses due to difficulties in supply and production, including some series like Black Clover, Boruto: Naruto Next Generations, Duel Masters King, Kingdom (Season 3), Major 2nd Season 2.

As of May 9, 2020, it was reported that nine anime series had completed production during the public health crisis.

==== Malaysia ====
Malaysia suspended all active filming in March. On May 19, the government has given the green light for the filming industry to resume its activities after Hari Raya Aidilfitri.

==== Philippines ====
Television talk, reality, variety and game shows in the Philippines temporarily filmed without a live audience. TAPE Inc. announced on March 9 that it would stop admitting live audiences for their variety show Eat Bulaga!, which airs on GMA Network; ABS-CBN followed suit, announcing on March 10 that they would do the same for their television shows including It's Showtime, Banana Sundae, Magandang Buhay, the second season of the Philippine version of I Can See Your Voice and ASAP. GMA Network then followed suit again with Wowowin (including its Saturday primetime edition), All-Out Sundays, Centerstage, The Boobay and Tekla Show, Mars Pa More and GMA News TV's Idol sa Kusina and Tonight with Arnold Clavio.

On March 14, 2020, ABS-CBN and GMA Network both announced that they will suspend production on their respective drama and live entertainment shows effective March 15 (the same day a quarantine declared by President Rodrigo Duterte was enacted in Metro Manila and Cainta, Rizal). Hence, ABS-CBN would air its previously aired shows temporarily in place for primetime viewing: 100 Days to Heaven, May Bukas Pa and On the Wings of Love. Additionally, the network gave its iWant TV series I Am U on its television debut. The following week, Walang Hanggan, The Legal Wife and Got to Believe were re-aired on the afternoon programming block, additionally, Wildflower, Tubig at Langis and the 2018 remake of the Chinese version of Meteor Garden on the primetime block. GMA Network followed suit with Ika-6 na Utos, Encantadia, Kambal, Karibal, My Husband's Lover, Alyas Robin Hood and Onanay.

On March 18, 2020, GMA News TV and CNN Philippines announced that they will temporarily go off-air beginning March 19, with the latter going off as the Worldwide Corporate Center in Mandaluyong, where their newsroom and studios are based, is being disinfected after a confirmed case in the offices of one of the building's tenants. The two networks eventually returned on March 20 and 23 respectively, with GMA News TV making way for a temporary full-time video simulcast of DZBB-AM and its studio programming.

In an unrelated matter, ABS-CBN's broadcast licence was not renewed by its expiry date by Congress, and the company's free television and radio stations were hence forced off the air by the National Telecommunications Commission on May 5, 2020, to much domestic controversy and further worldwide attention when the European Parliament released a resolution that could lead to the revocation of GSP certifications of Filipino Products if the cases of journalist Maria Ressa were not dropped alongside the denial of the Philippine congress to grant ABS-CBN a fresh 25-year broadcasting franchise. The license revocation is believed to involve the network's critical news coverage of President Duterte's administration, along with overall inaction from the Congress of the Philippines to renew their broadcast license since the matter came up in 2016. Although the reason for the closure is not directly due to COVID-19, some figures have expressed concern about its impact on public efforts to contain the pandemic. In a statement, ABS-CBN management said that "Millions of Filipinos will lose their source of news and entertainment when ABS-CBN is ordered to go off-air on TV and radio tonight (5 May 2020) when people need crucial and timely information as the nation deals with the COVID-19 pandemic".

Furthermore, Albay Representative Joey Salceda warned that the network's shutdown could add up to 2,600 COVID-19 cases, as many viewers would lose a vital source of information on how to keep themselves safe during the pandemic. Vice President Leni Robredo (who does not share Duterte's party affiliation) questioned the move as she believes the network's operations have helped in efforts to contain COVID-19 more than the country's offshore gaming operations, and added that the shutdown could "cost lives on top of the thousands who will lose their jobs". The company's premium network ABS-CBN News Channel is unaffected as a cable-only network, continuing to provide full news updates, along with ABS-CBN's social media accounts and YouTube channels, and its international networks, including The Filipino Channel. On May 8, 2020, the newscast of the network's flagship news programme, TV Patrol began to broadcast on ABS-CBN TV Plus channels TeleRadyo and Cine Mo!.

Pantawid ng Pag-ibig: At Home Together Concert was a benefit concert, broadcast on March 22.

Following the downgrade to general community quarantine, most shows continued their production with safety protocols, such as lock-in tapings in which artists are isolated in a bubble setup and are required to stay in nearby hotels for the duration of the taping cycles and wearing of face shields for certain in-studio programs.

==== Singapore ====
On February 7, the government announced that the framework scheme Disease Outbreak Response System Condition (DORSCON) was raised to Orange, while Suria held a live concert special celebrating the channel's 20th Anniversary, which was the last live program to have a live audience, among which President of Singapore Halimah Yacob was ushered as guest-of-honor. The last three episodes of the 26th season of another live-broadcast Channel 8 game show, The Sheng Siong Show (with the first episode airing a day after on the 8th), began suspending their studio audience, though contestants are still invited on-stage for studio segments including the Thousandfold Cash Reward; previously live-broadcast programs airing at the time such as Te:Ra Seh 4.0 and Sinar Lebaran 2020, also followed suit and continued production without live audience.

After Singapore enforced its lockdown restrictions (dubbed "Circuit Breaker") from April 7 to June 1, Suria and Vasantham both began their broadcasts earlier at 9 am starting April 8, and new local shows featuring celebrities premiered on morning and afternoon timeslots on April 9. However, some reruns on the afternoon were pre-empt on certain days to broadcast update messages delivered by Prime Minister Lee Hsien Loong. On April 12, Channel 5 brought the airing for the 2019 film Spider-Man: Far From Home earlier as opposed to a 2-3 year average gap as other films recently aired. Prior to the period, medical-themed dramas Big White Duel and My Guardian Angels were premiered as 7:30 pm and 9 pm dramas on Channel 8 respectively to raise awareness. Another medical-theme drama, You Can Be an Angel 3 began reruns from May 29 at 5:30 pm, after the finales of My Guardian Angels and Big White Duel on May 15 and 26, respectively.

Many other Singaporean shows have also postponed production or delayed broadcast to a later date, such as the monthly crime documentary television series CrimeWatch, annual Star Awards ceremony (initially on April 26 before being moved to 2021) and the 27th season of The Sheng Siong Show (postponed from May 9 to June 6). Since the suspension of production of local dramas, Channel 8 had begun airing international dramas asn replacements for local drama series on the 7:30 pm and 9 pm, starting with Heart and Greed and Sky Castle, as well as the Mandarin dubbing drama Titoudao: Inspired by the True Story of a Wayang Star.

On April 25 at 7:55 pm (SGT), all Mediacorp channels aired a short five-minute sing-along music video of celebrities and musicians singing a rendition of Kit Chan's "Home" as a tribute to commemorate the efforts of frontline and migrant workers during the outbreak. On June 1 at 7:30 pm (SGT), a second video short titled Stronger As One was broadcast on all Mediacorp channels, paying tribute to the current events and featured the sing-along segment of Stephanie Sun's "We Will Get There".

Both pay televisions by StarHub and SingTel (and along with their respective apps StarHub GO and CAST) also announced free preview screening during the lockdown from March 20 to June 1, and from April 1 to June 30, respectively. On June 2, after the lockdown was eased in Singapore, StarHub further extended the free preview until June 30.

==== South Korea ====
Many shows continued as planned, however traveling or outside shows such as SBS' Running Man, KBS 2TV's 2 Days & 1 Night, and MBC's Real Man 300 were suspended. Many shows accepted fewer spectators, to allow for social distancing, such as KBS 2TV's Immortal Songs, You Hee-yeol's Sketchbook, and MBC's King of Mask Singer. Mnet's competition series such as Road to Kingdom (a sequel to Queendom) and Good Girl changed completely, using one set instead of two, and have no live shows. They also changed the process of voting on the shows, so only competitors may vote.

In music shows such as SBS MTV's The Show, MBC M's Show Champion, Mnet's M Countdown, KBS 2TV's Music Bank, MBC's Show! Music Core, and SBS's Inkigayo, there are also no spectators. Instead, they used pre-recorded screaming and clapping.

=== Latin America ===
==== Argentina ====
Since the start of the national lockdown in Argentina, broadcast television in the country saw a 30% increase of viewership during the week between March 17 and 22. The networks increased the airtime of talk shows and news programming, while reality shows were still in production.

A fundraising special show aimed to the Red Cross for supplying hospitals and health centers aired throughout all six broadcast networks on April 5. The show, called "United for Argentina", included celebrities and famous people from the Argentine media. Donations reached a total of $87,938,624.

The only telenovela that was airing on broadcast television before the beginning of the pandemic, Separadas (from El Trece), was removed from the schedule after its March 19 airing and production was suspended temporarily. Two months later, producing company Pol-Ka definitely cancelled the show due to "economic reasons", leaving Argentine television without any scripted programming.

The first cases of COVID-19 reached Argentine television in June. Producers from Telefe's game show El Precio Justo were diagnosed, making the show to enter on hiatus and schedule reruns to air instead. El Precio Justo's hostess Lizy Tagliani later reported that she was diagnosed positive for COVID-19. Telefe also announced that talk show Cortá por Lozano would be broadcast with the hostess and panelists from their homes as a preventive measure. News channel C5N had to implement a protocol to prevent new infections after one of their journalists tested positive for COVID-19.

==== Brazil ====
TV Globo shifted their programming schedule by expanding their regular news programming and cutting entertainment programming. This included the suspension of the filming of the network's telenovelas for the safety of cast and crew. Because of this, the currently-running 9pm telenovela Amor de Mãe was replaced by the 2011 series Fina Estampa, the 7:30 pm current series Salve-se Quem Puder was replaced with the 2015 series Totalmente Demais and debut of the upcoming 6 pm series Nos Tempos do Imperador was postponed, with the 2017 series Novo Mundo airing on its place. Journalists for the network over the age of sixty were told to telework.

==== Mexico ====
In Mexico, as the health crisis expands, it seems that there will be inevitable changes to the broadcasting schedule. Unfortunately, as the health crisis has expanded in Spain and Brazil, it is difficult to broadcast overseas sports leagues, and it is expected that there will be some influence on the production of telenovelas. In addition, since the number of diagnostic tests of per population is relatively small, it is unlikely that there will be a small number of Mexican broadcasters among the suspected patient or potentially infected population, as it is difficult to say that the situation inside Mexico is better than other developing countries. However, it is believed that the minimum number of broadcasting personnel is contributing to the operation of broadcasting companies, as all broadcasting stations seek to slow down and minimize and spread infection.

=== Anglo-America ===
==== Canada ====
As in other regions, the pandemic has forced the modification of television production in Canada, including programs being reformatted to not use studio audiences or be produced remotely, and the suspension of filming for international scripted productions taking place in the country — such as Vancouver-based productions of The CW's Batwoman, The Flash, Riverdale, and Supernatural, as well as Snowpiercer and See. On March 24, 2020, production of the eighth season of Big Brother Canada ended, and a season finale aired on April 1 with no winner declared.

Both the Juno Awards and the Canadian Screen Awards, which were scheduled to be televised in March, were cancelled. The Canadian Screen Awards ultimately announced their winners via livestreaming in the week of May 25 to 28, while the Junos were presented in an online event on June 29. The 22nd Quebec Cinema Awards were also cancelled, with organizers announcing winners via livestreaming on June 10.

Due to the suspension of the National Hockey League (NHL), CBC Television replaced its weekly Hockey Night in Canada broadcast with Movie Night in Canada, a double bill of Canadian films. With virtually all live sports cancelled, TSN and Sportsnet both opted to rerun various past sports broadcasts, including the entire 2019 championship playoff run of the Toronto Raptors. In addition to Movie Night in Canada, CBC Television also launched a number of other special short-run series during the pandemic, including What're You At?, a remotely-produced Sunday-evening talk show with Tom Power, and Hot Docs at Home, a Thursday night series which broadcast several feature documentary films which had been slated to premiere at the cancelled Hot Docs Canadian International Documentary Festival.

To widen their availability, the CBC and Bell Media made their news channels, CBC News Network, CP24, CTV News Channel, and Ici RDI available as free previews on pay television providers, and freely available for streaming online without TV Everywhere authentication. Due to resource constraints, the CBC temporarily replaced its local evening newscasts with a simulcast from CBC News Network combining content from local and national journalists from across the country, a decision that was criticized by the Premier of Prince Edward Island Dennis King (CBC News: Compass is the province's only local daily television news program). By the end of March, however, local news service began to be restored in most markets.

The benefit event Stronger Together, Tous Ensemble aired across most major Canadian broadcasters on April 26; with around 11.5 million viewers, it was the most-watched non-sports telecast in Canadian history. On May 22, CTV aired the special Unsinkable Youth, hosted by Silken Laumann and Maitreyi Ramakrishnan in partnership with Kids Help Phone to promote awareness of youth mental health in the wake of the pandemic. and WE Celebrate: Class of 2020 on June 6, hosted by Lilly Singh.

In mid-August 2020, it was reported that local unions had resolved an impasse with U.S. studios over safety and testing protocols for their Vancouver-based productions.

==== United States ====
The COVID-19 pandemic has been the most impactful event to U.S. television production since the 2007–08 Writers Guild of America strike, which disrupted nearly all scripted television production. Upon the beginning of restrictions and stay-at-home orders that resulted in an industry-wide shutdown of nearly all television production, networks were dependent on their remaining inventory of completed programs that had not yet aired (resulting in some completed programs being delayed to air as contingencies in place of other programs), the remaining completed episodes of series whose production was interrupted, programs designed for or capable of being adapted for remote production — including talk shows, unscripted programs, one-off entertainment specials (such as the multi-network simulcast One World: Together at Home) and esports events as alternatives to cancelled or delayed professional sports.

On May 22, Georgia became the first U.S. state to release guidelines for safety protocols during film and television production. California began to authorize the resumption of film and television production on June 12; the Big Three networks' soap operas were among the first to resume production (with The Bold and the Beautiful resuming first-run episodes in July). Tyler Perry completed production on the next seasons of his BET dramas Sistas and The Oval in July and August respectively at his Atlanta-based Tyler Perry Studios complex using a "bubble" strategy, with Sistas being the first U.S. scripted primetime series to complete a season of production under COVID-19 safety protocols. Many of Adult Swim and the CW's Atlanta-based series soon followed suit.

The National Women's Soccer League was the first professional sports league to return to play, with all but one of its teams traveling to Salt Lake City, Utah, for a single-site Challenge Cup tournament broadcast live on CBS using off-site remote integration model production methods to minimize on-site staff.

Some late-night talk shows began to migrate from home-based formats in July, returning to new or re-configured studios with no studio audience, and continued use of remote interviews for guests. Other reality series that were suspended or delayed due to the pandemic, such as America's Got Talent, Big Brother, and Love Island, also began the process of returning to air with additional safety measures in place (and in the case of AGT and Love Island, being filmed from different locations than they usually are).

The fall schedules of the major broadcast networks were impacted by production delays and other contingencies, relying more on acquisitions and imports new to U.S. broadcast TV, deferred and/or postponed summer series, and other non-scripted output (which have a faster turnaround time) to fill timeslots until scripted series could return to air.

=== Europe ===
On March 18, 2020, the European Broadcasting Union (EBU) announced that the Eurovision Song Contest 2020 would be cancelled; it was scheduled to take place in Rotterdam, the Netherlands on May 12, 14 and 16. Rotterdam remained host of the 2021 contest on 18, 20, and May 22, 2021, and countries were required to submit new entries; many countries announced plans to retain their selected artists for 2020 with new songs for 2021. The EBU announced that it would air a non-competitive special on May 16 (the original date of the 2020 final), Eurovision: Europe Shine a Light, featuring the artists that were set to participate.

The Junior Eurovision Song Contest 2020 in Warsaw, Poland went ahead in a remote format, with most acts performing from studios in their home country. In September 2020, the EBU announced that the Eurovision Song Contest 2021 would have contingency plans allowing for such a format as a last resort, but with other options available, including a less-crowded production with a limited audience, and the option for countries to perform remotely if their act cannot travel to the Netherlands.

==== Belgium ====
A lockdown in Belgium influenced local studio Woestijnvis (of The Mole fame) to produce The Container Cup, a sports competition series where equipment is delivered to contestants' homes in camera-equipped shipping containers. Proving popular, the series has been optioned and sold internationally in markets such as Italy, Spain, and the United States.

==== Germany ====
As the public health crisis expanded significantly in Germany, there were cases where scheduled broadcasts were postponed or suspended and proceeded without the audience.

==== Netherlands ====
Dutch reality series Wie is de Mol?, which films its finale episode in front of a crowd in Vondelpark, decided to film without an audience for its twentieth season. Starting on March 15, satirical television programme Zondag met Lubach began filming without an audience. Production of the daily soap Goede tijden, slechte tijden suspended with the show's channel deciding to broadcast four episodes per week from March 23 instead of five.

==== Poland ====
In popular Polish TV sitcom The Lousy World (Świat według Kiepskich) two actors playing main roles died of COVID-19 as Dariusz Gnatowski (in October 2020) and Ryszard Kotys (in January 2021), which was one of cause of finishing series after 23 years. Soon after there was made final episode of sitcom, titled Eternal quarantine (Wieczna kwarantanna) dedicated to pandemic, there were recreated characters played by Gnatowski and Kotys by using of deepfake.

==== Spain ====
Since the second week of March all programs are filmed without audiences. The 11th season of music competition show Operación Triunfo went on hiatus as a precautionary measure over the ongoing pandemic. Comedy programs Late Motiv, El intermedio and El Hormiguero have decided to make low cost programs involving fewer people and with heavy use of videoconferences to avoid contagions.

Also, TV game shows like the Spanish adaptation of The Chase (El Cazador) were suspended or are using archived episodes like Saber y ganar, Ahora caigo, ¡Boom! and La ruleta de la suerte.

As well, TV series are suspended and/or in hiatus, like the recordings of the final season of La que se avecina or the 2nd season of Señoras del (h)ampa. Veneno, biographical series about the life and death of Cristina Ortiz, La Veneno, will only premiere in Atresplayer Premium with 1 of the 8 episodes on March 29, 2020, leaving the rest of episodes unaired until further notice.

==== United Kingdom ====
The BBC postponed filming for a celebrity version of Race Across the World that was set to start filming in April. The following week, the organisation suspended production of Peaky Blinders and Line of Duty. Ant & Dec's Saturday Night Takeaway cancelled a finale taping set at Walt Disney World following the park's closure. On March 15, filming for the second season of the Netflix series The Witcher in the United Kingdom was suspended for two weeks. Starting on the week of March 16, Jeremy Vine, Loose Women, and QI filmed without studio audiences. On March 18, the BBC suspended production of its medical dramas and soap operas, including EastEnders, Casualty, Doctors, and Holby City.

The BBC announced that it would devote resources to providing educational programmes as a supplement to cancelled classes beginning April 20, including 14 weeks of "core subject learning". This included Bitesize Daily (daily 20-minute programmes on the iPlayer for six age groups), a weekday strand on BBC Four catered towards GCSE and A-levels, and other digital content via BBC Sounds and Red Button.

On April 23, the BBC held a charity appeal titled The Big Night In, in collaboration between Children in Need and Comic Relief. Chef Jamie Oliver produced a new programme, Keep Cooking and Carry On, for Channel 4, and Charlie Brooker produced a one-off BBC Two special, Charlie Brooker's Antiviral Wipe, to satirize the impact of the pandemic and the British government response.

On May 12, it was reported that the British government would allow scripted television production to resume if safety precautions are instituted. Emmerdale and Coronation Street were among the first scripted series to resume. In July 2020, The War of the Worlds became the first British drama series to resume production. Several non-scripted programs normally produced in other countries were re-located domestically, including I'm a Celebrity...Get Me Out of Here! — whose twentieth series moved from Australia to Gwrych Castle in Wales, and The Wall – which moved to Wembley Arena after having filmed its first series at an Endemol Shine hub in Poland. Sky Studios paused production of all domestic dramas that involved international filming through at least spring 2021. On December 13, 2021, the BFI announced that a record £4bn recovery was spent on television production in the UK. TV production slumped during the impact of the COVID-19 pandemic. The £4bn in 2021 was compared to the £2.3bn figures spent in the same period between 2018-19.

=== MENASA ===
==== Bangladesh ====
Due to the COVID-19 pandemic, most of televising productions came to a halt in Bangladesh. The state television re-aired old shows such as Songsoptok, Ei Shob Din Ratri, Bohubrihi, and Kothao Keu Nei. Old episodes of Ityadi were also re-aired.

==== India ====
All television and film and production in India was halted on March 19, 2020.

According to Chief Minister K. Chandrasekhar Rao, filming, post-production work, and movie theaters began to reopen in phases beginning in June.

Tamil satellite channel Sun TV abruptly officially ended four of its running television soap operas such as Chocolate, Azhagu, Kalyana Parisu and Tamil Selvi owing to COVID-19 lockdown in India which also resulted in inter-district ban and due to artists refusing to shoot for the relevant television serials amid COVID-19 fears. Alongside Sun TV, other satellite television channels Star Vijay, Zee Tamil and Colors Tamil also started airing old television serials and movies from March 23, 2020. Tamil Nadu state government granted permission to start shooting for the television soap operas in the mid of May 2020 (May 21, 2020) with allowing only a maximum of 20 cast artists in indoors and cautioned to maintain strict health guidelines during shooting procedures. As of May 25, 2020, shooting of television soap operas commenced but government in Tamil Nadu imposed another lockdown between June 19 to 30 which resulted in yet another halting of television production. However, on July 7, 2020, most of the shooting of television soap operas resumed again to telecast all new episodes.

Sun TV Network revealed that it will telecast new episodes of their current television soap operas such as Kalyana Veedu, Nayagi, Roja, Kanmani and few others with effect from July 27, 2020. Star Vijay also stated that its prime time television soap operas such as Pandian Stores, Bharathi Kannamma, Ayutha Ezhuthu, Kaatrin Mozhi, Thaenmozhi B.A, Mouna Raagam and Baakiyalakshmi will be telecast with new episodes from July 27, 2020. Zee Tamil also confirmed that their prime time and non-prime time serials such as Sembaruthi, Yaaradi Nee Mohini, Oru Oorla Oru Rajakumari, Gokulathil Seethai, Poove Poochoodava, Rettai Roja, Raja Magal, Endrendrum Punnagai, Sathya and Neethane Enthan Ponvasantham will also be telecast with new episodes from July 27, 2020.

==== Saudi Arabia ====
Ahlan Simsim: Friends Time is a program that will be broadcast across the Middle East and North Africa, featuring characters from the Sesame Street co-production having a playdate over a video call service.

==== Turkey ====
Following a campaign started by the cast and crew members of various TV series, many networks temporarily suspended the production of their TV shows and programs until further notice. A few number of TV series, however, still continue to be produced.

=== Sub-Saharan Africa ===
==== South Africa ====
Many telenovelas announced an indefinite filming break, causing shows that were planning to shoot to cancel production as television programs faced a sudden reschedule. As South Africa began to ease restrictions starting on May 1, telenovelas and the TV industry as a whole were allowed to film, but only following social distancing rules. During the pandemic, TV news thrived as most South Africans received their information about the pandemic leading to increased ratings to news media.

== Affected productions ==
As of 2=MDY, a number of television shows announced that production was either delayed or stopped completely. Some shows continue with production but without a studio audience, and some shows would have reruns, since some shows could finish their seasons earlier than expected due to being unable to finish production for telecasting.

=== Suspended and/or postponed ===
==== Unscripted ====
Name	Network	Information	Source
All-Out Sundays	GMA Network	Production suspended	
The Amazing Race Australia	Network 10	Season 5 was originally intended to travel in Australia, India, Armenia, Georgia, Switzerland, Brazil, and Mexico; but was changed to race entirely in Australia amid international travel restrictions; however, production was later postponed due to interstate travel restrictions. Production later commenced in October 2020.	
The Amazing Race Canada	CTV	Season 8 production postponed indefinitely until 2022 due to the COVID-19 pandemic in Canada causing Canada's borders closed amid travel restrictions in selected provinces. Production of the 8th season was ultimately held in March 2022.	
The Apprentice UK	BBC One	Season 16 production postponed	
ASAP	ABS-CBN	Production suspended, replaced temporarily by replays of 2019 and later prods via best of compilation episodes for first two weeks, then later resumed remotely for subsequent episodes, but on April 9, 2020, it was temporarily moved to 2:30 pm and shortened to 1 hour, with its remaining airtime being used temporarily for a one-movie extension of Kapamilya Blockbusters Family Weekend. Resumed production in-studio without audience on June 14.	
Australia's Got Talent	Seven Network	Series 10 postponed	
Asia Express Hungary	TV2	Season 3 production postponed	
The Bachelor Australia	Network 10	Season 8 production suspended midway into filming on March 25, sending contestants home. Full on-location filming resumed on July 5. Two lockdown episodes (referred to "Love In Lockdown" on the show) were produced during the hiatus.	
Bachelor in Paradise Australia	Network 10	Season 3 scheduled to premiere in April; postponed to July 15 to accommodate programming gaps caused by the network's disrupted productions.	
Big Brother Australia	Seven Network	Season 12 production suspended for two days, after a member of production had been exposed to a confirmed positive case. Game events (challenges and eliminations) were stopped during the hiatus with contestants still being recorded via unmanned cameras.	
Big Brother Greece	Skai TV	Season 6 was due to premiere on March 15, 2020; postponed to August 30, 2020	
Big Brother Portugal	TVI	Season 5 was due to premiere on March 22, 2020; postponed to April 26, 2020, with a special quarantined set of episodes (titled BB Zoom) starting the series before the contestants moved into the house.	
The Block Australia	Nine Network	Production suspended 35 days into 90-day shoot on March 26. Production resumed on May 4	
The Block NZ	Three	Season 9 filming postponed	
Britain's Got Talent	ITV	Series 14 live shows postponed	
Celebrity Race Across the World	BBC One	Series filming was due to begin in April but postponed	
Centerstage	GMA Network	Production suspended	
The Chase UK	ITV	Production suspended	
Dancing with the Stars Austria	ORF1	Season 13 production suspended	
Dancing with the Stars Portugal	TVI	Season 5 production suspended	
Dragons' Den UK	BBC Two	Series 18 production postponed	
Eat Bulaga!	GMA Network	Production suspended; resumed partially with no studio audience on June 9, 2020.	
Everybody, Sing!	ABS-CBN	Series was due to premiere on March 15, 2020, but postponed to June 2021, timeslot was filled by The Reruns Of Gandang Gabi Vice	
Gemma Collins: Diva Forever	ITVBe	Production suspended	
Got Talent Portugal	RTP1	Season 7 suspended during the live competition	
The Great British Bake Off	Channel 4	Series 11 production originally postponed, was filmed in 6 weeks.	
Holey Moley Australia	Seven Network	Production suspended. Episodes had been filmed in the United States at Sable Ranch in Santa Clarita, California (where the United States version is filmed) before further episodes were moved to Australia.	
Hunted UK	Channel 4	Series 6 production postponed	
I Can See Your Voice Philippines	ABS-CBN	Season 2 production suspended, replaced temporarily by season 1 re-runs.	
It's Showtime	ABS-CBN	Production suspended, replaced temporarily by replays of previous episodes, resumed remotely on April 13 for partial segments, also from April 29, 2020, until the shutdown of ABS-CBN, the show was temporarily reduced to 1 hour with its remaining airtime being used for an extension of Kapamilya Blockbusters.	
Jeopardy! Poland	TVP2	Production suspended in March. Episodes ran until April. A new season premiered in August.	
Just the 2 of Us Greece	Open TV	Season 3 filming postponed after week 2	
Little Mix: The Search	BBC One	Production and premiere postponed	
Love Island UK	ITV2	Series 7 production postponed until 2021	
Maak My Famous	kykNET	Season 2 production suspended for one month	
MasterChef Brasil	Band	Season 7 production suspended	
The Only Way Is Essex	ITVBe	Series 26 production postponed	
Operation Triumph	La 1	Season 11 production suspended during Gala 9	
Going for Gold France	France 3	Production suspended	
RuPaul's Drag Race UK	BBC Three; WOW Presents Plus	Series 2 filming suspended	
SAS Australia	Seven Network	Filming suspended with celebrity contestants returning to Australia from New Zealand. Production now held in Australia's Snowy Mountains.	
Australian Survivor	Network 10	Season 8 (Brains V Brawn) production postponed amid international travel restrictions. This season was produced in mid-2021, in an Outback location near the town of Cloncurry, Queensland and aired in late 2021. Season 9 (Blood V Water) was also held domestically.	
Survivor Hungary	RTL Klub	Season 5 production postponed	
Survivor South Africa	M-Net	Season 8 (Immunity Island) production postponed. Production went ahead in late 2020, on Wild Coast Region of South Africa. Season 9 (Return of the Outcasts) also produced locally in late 2021.	
The Voice Australia	Nine Network	Season 9 production postponed	
The Voice Finland	Nelonen	Regular and Kids editions postponed	
The Voice Lithuania	LNK	Season 7 production suspended	
The Voice France	TF1	Season 9 production suspended	
Pékin Express	M6	Season 14 production suspended	
The Voice Myanmar	MRTV-4	Season 3 postponed	
The Voice Switzerland	3+	Season 3 production suspended	
The Voice Thailand	PPTV36	Season 9 production suspended	
The Voice UK	ITV	Series 9 production suspended; semi-finals and finals competitions have been postponed to November 7, 2020, and sending contestants home, coach Meghan Trainor will be conducted remotely in her Los Angeles home	
The Voice Canada (French)	TVA	Season 8 production suspended	
The Voice Spain	Antena 3	Season 7 production suspended	
The Voice Kids Azerbaijan	itv	Season 1 production suspended	
The Voice Kids Belgium	VTM	Season 5 production suspended	
The Voice Kids Germany	Sat.1	Season 8 production suspended	
The Voice Kids Indonesia	GTV	Season 4 postponed until 2021	
The Voice Kids Netherlands	RTL 4	Season 9 production suspended	
The Voice Teens Philippines	ABS-CBN	Season 2 production suspended, despite already taping all episodes prior to the enhanced community quarantine, sending contestants home; the Saturday telecast and the first hour of the Sunday telecast was replaced temporarily by season 1 of Your Face Sounds Familiar Kids Philippines and the second hour of the Sunday telecast was temporarily replaced with season 6 of Pilipinas Got Talent	
Ultimate Love	Africa Magic; DStv; GOtv	Filming suspended one week before completion	
Who Wants to Be a Millionaire Austria	ORF 2	Production suspended	
Who Wants to Be a Millionaire Croatia	HRT1	Production suspended	
Who Wants to Be a Millionaire Denmark	TV 2	Production suspended	
Who Wants to Be a Millionaire France	TF1	Production suspended	
Who Wants to Be a Millionaire Finland	Nelonen	Production suspended	
Who Wants to Be a Millionaire Germany	RTL	Production suspended	
Who Wants to Be a Millionaire Netherlands	RTL 4	Production suspended	
Who Wants to Be a Millionaire Italy	Canale 5	Production suspended	
Who Wants to Be a Millionaire Sweden	TV4	Production suspended	
Who Wants to Be a Millionaire Spain	Antena 3	Production suspended	
Who Wants to Be a Millionaire Poland	TVN	Production suspended	
Who Wants to Be a Millionaire India (Malayalam)	Asianet; Mazhavil Manorama	Production suspended	
Wowowin	GMA Network	Production suspended, resumed remotely on April 13	
X Factor Denmark	TV 2	Season thirteen production suspended	
Your Face Sounds Familiar Greece	ANT1	Season six filming postponed after week 7	

==== Scripted ====
Name	Network	Reason	Source
7de Laan	SABC 2	Filming suspended	
Ackley Bridge	Channel 4	Series four production postponed	
Amor de Mãe	Globo	Production suspended. Replaced by Fina Estampa and A Força do Querer. Production resumed in August 2020 and wrapped two months later. Resumed airing on March 1, 2021, with new episodes starting March 15. Finished its run on April 9.	
Anak ni Waray vs. Anak ni Biday	GMA Network	Production suspended, replaced temporarily by Kambal, Karibal	
Ang sa Iyo ay Akin	ABS-CBN	Series was due to premiere on March 23, 2020, but postponed to August 2020, timeslot was filled by Got to Believe	
Around the World in 80 Days	BBC; France Télévisions; ZDF; RAI	Production suspended	
Back to the Rafters	Amazon Prime Video	Production suspended	
Baptiste	BBC One	Series 2 production halted	
Beyhadh 2	Sony Entertainment Television	Abruptly off aired without conclusion.	
Bilangin ang Bituin sa Langit	GMA Network	Production suspended, replaced temporarily by Ika-6 na Utos	
Britannia	Amazon Video	Production suspended	
Call the Midwife	BBC One	Series 9 production suspended	
Carnival Row	Prime Video	Production suspended, but resumed	
Casualty	BBC One	Series 34 production suspended, transmission break started on May 30, 2020, program will return later in the Summer.	
Coronation Street	ITV	Production suspended, resumed in June	
Dadi Amma Dadi Amma Maan Jao	StarPlus	The low ratings of the series before being halted on COVID-19 outbreak made the channel to axe it without a conclusion before the shootings resumed.	
Death in Paradise	BBC	Series 10 production suspended	
Descendants of the Sun	GMA Network	Production suspended, replaced temporarily by Encantadia. Resumed filming in September 2020 and returned to broadcast on October 26, 2020.	
Doctors	BBC One	Series twenty-one production suspended	
EastEnders	BBC One	Production suspended	
Emmerdale	ITV	Production suspended, will resume in May	
Fair City	RTÉ One	Production postponed; episodes reduced to two per week; last recorded episode aired on Easter Day	
First Yaya	GMA Network	Production suspended after filming of the first episode	
Goede tijden, slechte tijden	RTL 4	Production suspended	
Holby City	BBC One	Series 22 production suspended	
Hollyoaks	Channel 4	Production suspended	
Home and Away	Seven Network	Production suspended	
Kamen Rider Zero-One	TV Asahi	Production suspended, resumed on June 1. Resumed airing on June 21	
Line of Duty	BBC One	Series 6 started filming in February, then postponed	
The Lord of the Rings	Amazon Studios	Casting and pre-production suspended	
Love of My Life	GMA Network	Production suspended, replaced temporarily by My Husband's Lover	
Love Thy Woman	ABS-CBN	Production suspended, replaced temporarily by The Legal Wife 1 week after airing fresh episodes.	
Magkaagaw	GMA Network	Production suspended, replaced temporarily by Ika-6 na Utos	
Mashin Sentai Kiramager	TV Asahi	Production suspended, resumed on June 1. Resumed airing on June 21	
Neighbours	10 Peach	Production suspended for two days	
Nos Tempos do Imperador	Globo	Production suspended. Release date originally scheduled to March 30, now delayed indefinitely	
Peaky Blinders	BBC One	Season 6 began pre-production but postponed	
Pepito Manaloto	GMA Network	Production suspended, replaced temporarily by re-runs of earlier episodes	
Pobol y Cwm	S4C	Production suspended	
Prima Donnas	GMA Network	Production suspended, replaced temporarily by Ika-6 na Utos	
Ang Probinsyano	ABS-CBN	Season 7 production suspended, replaced temporarily by May Bukas Pa	
RFDS	Seven Network	Production suspended	
River City	BBC One Scotland	Production suspended	
Rownd a Rownd	S4C	Production suspended	
Salve-se Quem Puder	Globo	Production suspended; resumed in August 2020 and currently ongoing. Resumed airing on March 22, 2021, with new episodes starting May 17.	
School 2020	KBS	Filming process factually postponed	
See	Apple TV+	Production postponed	
A Soldier's Heart	ABS-CBN	Production suspended, replaced temporarily by iWant Originals including I Am U and subsequently Wildflower	
Voltes V: Legacy	GMA Network	Production postponed to 2021, began in May 2021 with a lock-in taping in place but briefly suspended in August 2021 due to the Delta variant resulted in the enhanced community quarantine in the country	
Wentworth	Fox Showcase	Season 8 filming suspended	
Wynonna Earp	Syfy; CTV Sci-Fi Channel	Production suspended	

==== Talk shows ====
Name	Network	Reason	Source
The Boobay and Tekla Show	GMA Network	Production suspended	
Idol sa Kusina	GMA News TV	Production suspended	
Lorraine	ITV	Production suspended	
Mars Pa More	GMA Network	Production suspended	
Tonight with Arnold Clavio	GMA News TV	Production suspended	

==== Anime ====
On March 18, 2020; Funimation announced that their same-day English dubbing and broadcast of domestic Japanese anime would be delayed for the remainder of the Winter season as well as upcoming seasons, but they stated that simulcasts in English subtitles will continue as scheduled. Later on April 11, 2020; Funimation announced that their same-day dubs slowly resumed production on a work-from-home basis. On March 27, 2020, Crunchyroll announced that they would also delay English dubbing of their licensed anime series as a result of the pandemic. On April 2, 2020, Sentai Filmworks' HIDIVE announced that they will also be delaying dubbed titles until further notice. In early April 2020, many anime series were revealed to be postponed from their intended broadcast dates due to Japan declaring a state of emergency on April 6, 2020, because of the increase of cases in the nation. On April 19, 2020, TV Tokyo, MediaNet & ShoPro announced that the Pokémon anime series will be going on hiatus, with production on the TV anime series suspended, and in its place it will rerun the old episodes on all networks and on TV Tokyo starting April 26, 2020, due to the complicated COVID-19 pandemic in Japan. It has not been stated when new episodes will air, but the staff said that they will make an announcement once they receive information on a return date. On April 20, 2020, Toei Animation announced that their shows: One Piece, Pretty Cure, and Digimon, were also suspended. Production of Sazae-san was also suspended, while studios relying on computer-generated imagery faced excessive bandwidth use when employees at home tried to access company servers at the same time.

Name	Animation Studio	Network	Reason	Source
A3! Season Autumn & Winter	P.A. Works / Studio 3Hz	Tokyo MX / Funimation	Broadcast premiere postponed	
A Certain Scientific Railgun T	J.C.Staff	Tokyo MX / Crunchyroll / Funimation	Production suspended	
Akudama Drive	Pierrot / Too Kyo Games	N/A	Broadcast premiere postponed	
Appare-Ranman!	P.A. Works	Tokyo MX / Funimation	Production suspended	
Assault Lily Bouquet	Shaft	N/A	Broadcast premiere postponed	
Black Clover	Pierrot	TV Tokyo / Crunchyroll / Funimation	Production suspended	
Boruto: Naruto Next Generations	Pierrot	TV Tokyo / Crunchyroll / Viz Media	Production suspended, resume on July 5	
Cardfight!! Vanguard Gaiden if	OLM	TV Tokyo	Broadcast premiere postponed	
Chibi Maruko-chan	Nippon Animation	Fuji TV / Fuji Network System	Production suspended	
Diary of Our Days at the Breakwater	Doga Kobo	Tokyo MX / Funimation	Production suspended	
Digimon Adventure:	Toei Animation	Fuji TV / Crunchyroll	Production suspended, resumed on June 28	
Duel Masters King	Brain's Base	TV Tokyo	Production suspended	
Ex-Arm	Visual Flight	Tokyo MX / Crunchyroll	Broadcast premiere postponed	
Food Wars! Shokugeki no Soma: The Fifth Plate	J.C.Staff	Tokyo MX / Crunchyroll	Production suspended	
Gal & Dino: My Roomie Is a Dino	Space Neko Company / Kamikaze Douga	Tokyo MX / Funimation	Production suspended	
Girl Gaku ~Sei Girls Square Gakuin~	OLM / Wit Studio	TV Tokyo	Production suspended	
Gundam Build Divers Re:Rise Season 2	Sunrise Beyond	Tokyo MX	Production suspended	
Haikyu!! To The Top: Part 2	Production I.G	JNN (MBS)	Broadcast premiere postponed	
Hakushon Daimaō 2020	Tatsunoko Production / Nippon Animation	ytv / NNS	Production suspended	
Healin' Good Pretty Cure	Toei Animation	ABC / ANN / TV Asahi	Production suspended; resumed on June 28	
Higurashi When They Cry	Passione	N/A	Broadcast premiere postponed	
Hypnosis Mic: Division Rap Battle: Rhyme Anima	A-1 Pictures	Tokyo MX	Broadcast premiere postponed	
IDOLiSH7: Second Beat	Troyca	Tokyo MX / Crunchyroll	Production suspended	
Ikebukuro West Gate Park	Doga Kobo	N/A	Broadcast premiere postponed	
Is It Wrong to Try to Pick Up Girls in a Dungeon? Season III	J.C.Staff	Tokyo MX / Crunchyroll	Broadcast premiere postponed	
Kingdom Season 3	Pierrot / Studio Signpost	NHK / Funimation	Production suspended	
Kiratto Pri Chan	Tatsunoko Production / DongWoo A&E	TV Tokyo	Season three anime production temporarily suspended; Broadcast premiere of season 3 postponed	
Kyoshin to Hyōka no Shiro	TriF Studio	N/A	Broadcast premiere postponed	
Log Horizon: Destruction of the Round Table	Studio Deen	NHK	Broadcast premiere postponed	
Maesetsu!	Studio Gokumi / AXsiZ	N/A	Broadcast premiere postponed	
Major 2nd Season 2	OLM	NHK / Crunchyroll	Production suspended	
Mewkledreamy	J.C.Staff	TXN / Kids Station	Production suspended	
My Teen Romantic Comedy SNAFU Climax	feel.	TBS / HIDIVE	Broadcast premiere postponed	
No Guns Life: Part 2	Madhouse	TBS / Funimation	Broadcast premiere postponed	
Ochikobore Fruit Tart	feel.	N/A	Broadcast premiere postponed	
One Piece	Toei Animation	Fuji TV / Crunchyroll / Funimation	Production suspended	
Pokémon	OLM Team Kato	TV Tokyo / MediaNet / ShoPro	Season 23 anime production temporarily suspended	
Re:Zero − Starting Life in Another World 2nd Season	White Fox	TV Tokyo / Crunchyroll	Broadcast premiere postponed	
Sazae-san	Eiken	Fuji TV / Fuji Network System	Production suspended / voice recording production suspended	
Senyoku no Sigrdrifa	Aniplex	N/A	Broadcast premiere postponed	
Skate-Leading Stars	J.C.Staff	N/A	Broadcast premiere postponed	
So I'm a Spider, So What?	N/A	N/A	Broadcast premiere postponed	
Soreike! Anpanman	TMS Entertainment	Nippon TV / NNS	Voice recording production suspended	
Sword Art Online: Alicization – War of Underworld – Part 2	A-1 Pictures / Aniplex	Tokyo MX / Crunchyroll / Funimation	Broadcast premiere postponed	
That Time I Got Reincarnated as a Slime Season 2	Eight Bit	Tokyo MX / Crunchyroll / Funimation	Broadcast premiere postponed	
The Irregular at Magic High School Season 2	Eight Bit	Tokyo MX	Broadcast premiere postponed	
The Millionaire Detective Balance: Unlimited	CloverWorks / Aniplex	Fuji TV / Funimation	Production suspended	
The Misfit of Demon King Academy	Silver Link / Aniplex	N/A	Broadcast premiere postponed	
The Promised Neverland Season 2	CloverWorks / Aniplex	Fuji TV	Broadcast premiere postponed	
The Quintessential Quintuplets Season 2	Bibury Animation Studios	TBS / Crunchyroll / Funimation	Broadcast premiere postponed	
The Seven Deadly Sins: Anger's Judgement	N/A	TV Tokyo / BS-TX	Broadcast premiere postponed	
The Slime Diaries: That Time I Got Reincarnated as a Slime	Eight Bit	Tokyo MX / Crunchyroll / Funimation	Broadcast premiere postponed	
Tsukiuta the Animation Season 2	Children's Playground Entertainment	Tokyo MX / Funimation	Broadcast premiere postponed	
Vladlove	Drive / Production I.G	N/A	Broadcast premiere postponed	
Yu-Gi-Oh! Sevens	Bridge	TV Tokyo	Production suspended	
Zoids Wild Zero	OLM	TV Tokyo	Production suspended	

=== Modified ===
These tables include series that adopted remotely-filmed and home-based productions for one or more episodes, or are using studio-based productions with additional safety protocols, such as reduced staff, lack of studio audience, and/or visible social distancing.

==== Unscripted ====
Name	Network	Notes	Source
Ant & Dec's Saturday Night Takeaway	ITV		
Australian Ninja Warrior	Nine Network		
Australian Survivor	Network 10	Season 7 (All Stars) live season finale and reunion conducted with no studio audience	
Big Brother Brasil	Globo		
Big Brother Germany	Sat.1		
Big Brother Israel	Channel 13		
Big Brother Sweden	TV4; Sjuan; C More		
Celebs Go Dating	E4	A shorter series with a "socially distanced" theme, titled Celebs Go Virtual Dating, was aired instead of series 9.	
Germany's Next Topmodel	ProSieben	Season 15 finale conducted with no studio audience. Heidi Klum remotely appeared in her Los Angeles home.	
Idols Germany	RTL		
Italia's Got Talent	Sky Uno; TV8		
Let's Dance	RTL		
The Masked Singer Australia	Network 10		
The Mole Belgium Finale	VIER		
The Mole Netherlands Finale	AVROTROS		
QI	BBC Two		
Taskmaster	Channel 4		

==== Talk shows ====
Name	Network	Notes	Source
heute-show	ZDF		
Jeremy Vine	Channel 5		
The Last Leg	Channel 4		
The Late Late Show	RTÉ One		
Late Motiv	#0		
Loose Women	ITV	Production suspended on March 20 and resumed remotely on May 4	
Magandang Buhay	ABS-CBN	Production suspended on March 13 and resumed remotely on March 30	
The Marilyn Denis Show	CTV		
The Project	Network 10		
Q&A	ABC		
Question Time	BBC		
Shaun Micallef's Mad as Hell	ABC		
The Social	CTV		
Studio 10	Network 10		
Zondag met Lubach	NPO 3		

==== Scripted ====
Name	Network	Reason	Source
Shortland Street	TVNZ 2	Due to COVID-19 restrictions on non-essential services	

=== Show reruns ===
==== Anime ====
Name	Animation Studio	Network	Source
Detective Conan	TMS Entertainment	Nippon TV / ytv / STV / NNS	
Pokémon	OLM Team Kato	TV Tokyo / MediaNet / ShoPro	
One Piece	Toei Animation	Fuji TV / KTV / Fuji Network System	
Healin' Good Pretty Cure	Toei Animation	TV Asahi / Asahi Broadcasting / ANN	
Sazae-san	Eiken	Fuji TV / Fuji Network System	

==== Drama series ====
Promoted series	Replaced series	Network	Source
Haken no Hinkaku 2	Haken no Hinkaku: 2007 Special Edition	Nippon TV / NNS	
BG Personal Bodyguard 2	BG Personal Bodyguard Selection	TV Asahi / ANN	
Unsung Cinderella	Good Doctor	Fuji TV / KTV / FNS	
Spiral Labyrinth: DNA Forensics	Silent Voice	TV Tokyo / TXN	
MIU404	Kounodori Selection	TBS TV / MBS / JNN	
Miman Keisatsu	Nobuta wo Produce: Special Edition	Nippon TV / NNS	
Hanzawa Naoki 2	No Side Game: Special Edition	TBS TV / MBS / JNN	
Suits Season 2	Confidence Man JP	Fuji TV / KTV / FNS	

=== Seasons ended prematurely ===
Name	Network	Notes	Source
Big Brother Canada	Global Television Network	Season 8 discontinued during week 4 on March 24, 2020, reduced from 83 to 25 days; season ending early and sending contestants home. There was no winner for this season.	
Big Brother India (Malayalam)	Asianet	Season 2 discontinued on week 11, reduced from 105 to 74 days; season ending early and sending contestants home. There was no winner for this season.	
Celebrity Big Brother Italy	Canale 5 La5; Italia 1 Mediaset Extra	Season 4 production reduced from 111 days to 92 days, but continued indefinitely	
Dancing with the Stars Australia	Network 10	Season 17 ended earlier from April 5 to March 29, the finale conducted with no audience.	
Love Island France	Amazon Prime Video France	Production suspended two weeks into four-week production with contestants sent home early from South Africa	

=== New productions ===
Name	Network	Notes	Source
Eurovision: Europe Shine a Light	AVROTROS; NOS; NPO	Held in lieu of the cancelled 2020 Eurovision Song Contest.	
Junior MasterChef Australia	Network 10	Renewed as main MasterChef Australia series was produced in compliance with Social Distancing requirements. Season 3 will be the first season since 2011.	

=== Series cancelled due to factors brought upon by the pandemic ===
Name	Network	Notes	Source
Dancing for a Dream Argentina	El Trece	Original season 15 production cancelled in September 2020 due to social distancing measures.	
Gandhi	SBS	Production cancelled in July 2020 due to social distancing measures.	
The Bottomline with Boy Abunda	ABS-CBN	Cancelled after ABS-CBN Shutdown	
Tonight with Boy Abunda	ABS-CBN	Cancelled after ABS-CBN Shutdown	
Salamat Dok	ABS-CBN	Cancelled after ABS-CBN Shutdown	
Home Sweetie Home	ABS-CBN	Cancelled after ABS-CBN Shutdown	
24/7	ABS-CBN	Cancelled after ABS-CBN Shutdown and 4 episodes were aired.	
Make It with You	ABS-CBN	When production was suspended, its timeslot was temporarily replaced by On the Wings of Love. Cancelled after 45 episodes were aired.	
Pamilya Ko	ABS-CBN	When production was suspended, its timeslot was temporarily replaced by 100 Days to Heaven. Cancelled after 135 episodes were aired.	

== See also ==
- Impact of the COVID-19 pandemic on cinema
