= BDR =

BDR may refer to:

== Technology ==
- BD-R or Blu-ray Disc recordable
- Backup Designated Router, the router interfaced used in the Open Shortest Path First protocol if the designated router fails
- Backcountry Discovery Routes, US-base non-profit organization that creates off-highway routes for dual-sport and adventure motorcycle travel
- Backup and Disaster Recovery appliance
- PostgreSQL Bi Directional Replication

== Other uses ==
- Bangladesh Rifles, now Border Guard Bangladesh
- Belajar dari Rumah, an Indonesian television block
- Big Dad Ritch, lead vocalist for American heavy metal band Texas Hippie Coalition
- Bilateral Digit Reduction, in fossil birds
- Bill Davis Racing, a NASCAR team
- Bombardier, a non-commissioned officer rank in some artillery corps, abbreviated Bdr
- German Cycling Federation (Bund Deutscher Radfahrer)
- Sikorsky Memorial Airport (FAA and IATA codes)
