= Adesuwa (name) =

Adesuwa is a female name by Edo people. It means "in the center of prosperity". Notable people with the name include:

- Adesuwa Aighewi, American fashion model and filmmaker
- Adesuwa Obasuyi (born 1990), Nigerian environmentalist and climate change advocate
- Adesuwa Oni, television actress (African Queens, Casualty)
- Adesuwa Onyenokwe (born 1963), Nigerian television personality

== See also ==
- Adesua Etomi (born 1988), Nigerian actress and entrepreneur
