= EQM =

EQM may refer to:

- eligible-qualifying mile and elite-qualifying mile, types of measure used in a frequent-flyer program
- Environmental Quality Management, a U.S. environmental engineering and remediation company
- Equitrans Midstream, a U.S. energy pipeline company
- extended quality method, a method of defuzzification
