= Adesuwa Obasuyi =

Nigeria climate change activist

- Born: February 1, 1990 (age 36); Nigeria
- Education: BS.c Biochemistry Delta State University, Ms.c Environmental Quality Management University of Benin
- Occupations: An environmentalist & climate change activist
- Known for: Climate Change Advocate

Adesuwa Obasuyi (born February 1990) is a Nigerian environmentalist, climate change advocate, and the initiator of Sustainable Africa Cities and Communities Initiative - an environmental non-governmental organization that focuses on waste, and waste data management in Nigeria and Africa. She currently works as the Climate Change Policy Manager at the British High Commission, Abuja.

== Early and personal life ==
She attended Delta State University, and obtained a bachelor's degree in Biochemistry in 2010; she went further to get a master's degree in Environmental Quality Management(2014 - 2017) from the University of Benin.

== Career ==
Early in her career, she worked as a research assistant while advocating for the environment and climate change. Adesuwa Obasuyi is the initiator of the Sustainable Africa Cities and Communities Initiative, which is an environmental non-governmental organization that focuses on waste and waste data management in Nigeria and Africa. She rose to the position of an Operations Manager at Sustainable Africa Waste Initiative (SAWI), which is an environmental non-governmental organization that focuses on waste and waste data management in Nigeria and Africa. She further went on to become an ambassador for TeachSDGS. She is also an ambassador for the Global Youth Climate Network. Currently, she works at British High Commission, Abuja as a climate change policy manager. She has several experiences in volunteering. She has volunteered with the Nigerian youth SDGs network (as a member and mentor), pick that trash, and NYSC/NDLEA drug-free club at Bayelsa. people in decision-making. She is a Country Representative for the African Circular Economy Network and a City Organizer for Circular Economy Club. She is also a Global Youth Climate Network Climate Ambassador, and a Teach SDGs Ambassador.
