= Wai Chim =

Chinese-American author

- Born: 1983 (age 42–43); New York, United States
- Occupation: Author
- Television: Australian Survivor

Wai Chim (born 1983) is a Chinese American author of books for children and young adults residing in Australia. She was a contestant on Australian Survivor: Brains V Brawn, the sixth season of Australian Survivor.

== Early life ==
Born and raised in New York, Wai spoke Cantonese in her home growing up, and spent time in Japan before relocating to Australia in 2006. Chim graduated from Duke University where she majored in English and Economics.

== Writing career ==
Wai writes books for children and young adults. In addition to the Chook Chook series, her next book Shaozhen: Through My Eyes is set in rural China, and her third has the “great leap forward” as a backdrop. Shaozhen: Through My Eyes is part of the "Natural Disaster Zones" series which was awarded the 2019 Educational Publishing Award, given by the Australian Publishers Association (APA). Her most recent release, The Surprising Power of a Good Dumpling, features a Chinese Australian family, and was finalist for the 2021 Kirkus Prize for Young Readers' Literature. It is also recommended by the New York Times as a "Fantastic, Flavor-Filled Novel for Kids."

== Survivor ==
Wai appeared as a contestant on the Australian reality television show, Australian Survivor: Brains V Brawn. She made it far into the competition and placed fifth overall voted out on day 44 of 48 days.

== Publications ==
- The Chook Chook Series, University of Queensland Press
- Chook Chook: Mei's Secret Pets, 2012, ISBN 978-1459687257
- Chook Chook: Little and Lo in the City, 2013, ISBN 978-1459691735
- Chook Chook: Saving the Farm, 2014, ISBN 978-0702253164
- Shaozhen: Through My Eyes - Natural Disaster Zones, Allen & Unwin, 2017, ISBN 978-1760113797
- Freedom Swimmer, Scholastic Press, 2021 (first published 2016), ISBN 978-1338656138
- The Surprising Power of a Good Dumpling, 2019 (Allen & Unwin), ISBN 978-1338756319
