= Remote integration model =

Method of live television production

Remote integration model, also known as REMI and at-home production, is a method of live production for television broadcasts and video distribution that transmits live feeds to a single centralized production facility or workflow for integration into a finished feed, which is then distributed to broadcasters.

Initially developed as a less staff- and equipment-intensive alternative to on-site production of live sports events using production trucks or local studios, REMI grew in popularity in 2020 due to the impact of the COVID-19 pandemic on television, which required heavily isolated remote work. However, the practice — particularly in live sports productions — is subject to criticism for the compromises in image quality, stability, and the detachment of commentators and producers operating sometimes thousands of miles from the events they're covering.

== History ==
NBC Sports deployed a remote production workflow for the 1996 Summer Olympics, which were hosted in Atlanta, Georgia. To reduce the amount of on-site staff needed to cover all events, producers instead had taped and time-shifted footage transmitted from events to a single centralized production facility at 30 Rockefeller Plaza in New York City nicknamed the "virtual International Broadcast Center", allowing on-site producers to focus on live broadcasts. NBC continued the practice in subsequent Olympic Games, and in 2013 established a permanent remote International Broadcast Center in Stamford, Connecticut.

Early REMI productions relied on high-bandwidth T1 lines and grew into higher-speed connections and IP routing capabilities as they became available, in order to accommodate increases in broadcast display resolution and the number of cameras in use.

Alongside the growth of in-house REMI studios, independent remote-production service providers expanded into providing full REMI services and commentary on contract to other events and leagues. For example, VISTA Worldlink, which had engaged in global-commentary rebroadcasts of Major League Soccer (MLS) and CONCACAF matches, expanded into providing full REMI services and commentary on contract to United Soccer League competitions, National Women's Soccer League (NWSL), the U.S. Open Cup, and MLS.

=== Lowering production costs ===
Sports leagues with smaller broadcast budgets began deploying REMI productions to allow for more live-broadcast and livestreamed matches. For example, with A+E as a broadcast partner in 2016, the National Women's Soccer League produced match livestreams using REMI practices with budgets as small as $10,000 per match, compared to $50,000 to $100,000 for television broadcasts using a production truck. The Premier Hockey Federation used REMI production to expand its match availability to its full season and produce its first linear television broadcasts. NASCAR consolidated its remote production to a studio in Charlotte, North Carolina, in 2019 where it produced 30 events remotely.

=== Use during the COVID-19 pandemic ===
The impact of the COVID-19 pandemic on television forced live event coverage to adapt to strict rules on isolation. Entities already using REMI methods were able to return to broadcasting events since most production staff and commentators already operated in remote, isolated facilities.

Isolation measures required to control the COVID-19 pandemic in 2020 and 2021 also led live television production companies to adopt REMI practices in sports and fields that previously had not deployed them. For example, NBC used practices from its Olympics coverage to produce college football broadcasts that had traditionally relied on extensive on-site production. ESPN migrated National Basketball Association coverage to REMI productions based in Bristol, Connecticut, continuing into the 2021–22 NBA season. The 47th Daytime Emmy Awards in 2020 adapted to REMI production after the in-person ceremony was cancelled.

== Methods ==
In traditional remote broadcast production, multiple cameras routed to a vision mixer and microphones routed to a mixing console, operated by a technical director receiving orders from a director in an on-site studio or production truck (OB van) connected to a transmission network, either a fiber access or a satellite uplink via a SNG truck. A REMI workflow instead routes camera and audio feeds via dedicated fiber optic, communications satellite, or facility or cellular internet connections to a remote production center. Such consolidation allows one production staff and set of equipment to produce multiple events, in sequence or simultaneously, without traveling, setting up, and tearing down production equipment between events. For simple one-camera productions, only a single on-site camera operator might be necessary.

This workflow also allows commentators to call events from the live feeds without being on-site. For example, Matt Vasgersian called Los Angeles Angels games from MLB Network's studio in Secaucus, New Jersey to accommodate his day-to-day role at the channel. Prior to COVID-19, San Francisco Giants color commentator Mike Krukow had already planned to call selected games remotely, as his inclusion body myositis had made him unfit to travel with the team.

REMI production methods can be further streamlined by use of cloud computing production tools, further eliminating part or all of the centralized production facility. BT Sport engaged a test of such a cloud-based workflow for a UEFA Youth League match using aggregated cellular links and local broadband to also eliminate the need for dedicated transport connections.

== Drawbacks and criticism ==
REMI productions rely on IP transport from the venue to the remote production facility, which can be subject to outages if redundant transport methods aren't available on-site. Failures can result in compression artifacts or outages, which can affect the collection of sports analytics data and social media coverage of live events. Players in the NWSL complained when match footage was unavailable for review, or when camera angles weren't available to review goals or important plays.

Tight budgets facilitated by REMI production can result in low-quality productions that doesn't meet viewers' expectations, leading to organizers being forced to increase spending on equipment and on-site staff to compensate.

Off-site commentators are limited to what cameras and microphones can record and can be tasked with calling several consecutive games per day, leading to facutal errors, omissions, and mischaracterizations of an event's atmosphere. On-site staff can be subject to communications latency from off-site producers. Commentary can become sufficiently delayed from live events to be recognized by viewers. Viewers can also recognize attempts to make commentators sound or appear to be reporting live from an event when they're remote.

== See also ==
- Impact of the COVID-19 pandemic on television, and in the United States
- Remote broadcast
- Production truck
