= Ultimate Love season 1 =

Nigeria television show

Ultimate Love
- Season 1
- Presented by: Dakore Egbuson-Akande; Oluwaseun Olaniyan
- No. of days: 50
- No. of housemates: 16
- Winner: Roksie
- Runner-up: Iykeresa

Release
- Original network: Africa Magic; DStv; GOtv
- Original release: 9 February – 29 March 2020

Ultimate Love season 1 was the debut season of the Nigerian reality competition series, Ultimate Love. It premiered on 9 February 2020 on DStv channel 198. Dakore Egbuson-Akande and Oluwaseun Olaniyan were the hosts. The ultimate prize is finding love and if the Ultimate Couple decides to get married, they will win a lavish all-expenses-paid wedding and a fully furnished home. The winning couple of ultimate love season 1 reality show will also get a cash prize of N5million after being married for a year.

Ultimate Love was expected to run for 60 days, but was cut short and ran for 50 days, due to the COVID-19 pandemic.

On 29 March 2020, Roksie, the duo of Rosie and Kachi became the winners of the show, after polling the highest number of votes. Iykeresa (Iyke and Theresa) and Bolar (Bolanle and Arnold) were the runner-up love guests of the show.

Kachi later proposed to Rosie on the show during their discussion with the hosts before the end of the program on 29 March. Rosie said yes.

== Housemates ==
Housemates	Age on Entry	Occupation	Residence/Birthplace	couple name	Day entered	Day exited
Rosemary "Rosie"	35	School teacher	Ogun State	Roksie	0	Day 50 (Winner)
Ucheagwu "Kachi" Onyeka	32	Serial entrepreneur	Imo State	Roksie	0	Day 50 (Winner)
Ikenna "Iyke" Nnamadi	24	Entrepreneur and Manufacturer	Enugu State	Iykeresa	0	Day 50 (Runner up)
"Theresa" Ifeoma Ugorji	23	Optometrist	Imo State	Iykeresa	0	Day 50 (Runner up)
Henry "Arnold" Olatunde	32	Writer, Singer, Entrepreneur and content producer	Ogun State	Bolar	0	Day 50 (3rd place)
"Bolanle" Oluchi Babalola	35	Media presenter and production manager	Ondo State	Bolar	0	Day 50 (3rd place)
"Chris" Adah	35	Brand architect	Abia State	Doublechris	0	Day 50 (4th place)
"Chris" ville	34	Importer, Blogger and content producer.	Lagos State	Doublechris	0	Day 50 (4th place)
Sylvia Chioma	23	Student and Entrepreneur	Anambra State	Chivia	5	Day 50 (5th place)
Uchenna Nwakweze "Uche"	28	Development Economist	Anambra State	Chivia	5	Day 50 (5th place)
Precious "Presh Talker"	27	MC and Content Creator	Abia State	Preshdavid	5	Dumped Day 45
"David" Wilson	34	MC and entrepreneur	Bayelsa State	Preshdavid	0	Dumped Day 45
Emeka Sunny Ewenike "Obichukwu"	32	Social worker and businessman	Imo State	Obiebi	0	Dumped Day 45
Juliet "Ebiteinye"	26	Accountant	Bayelsa State	Obiebi	0	Dumped Day 45
Jonathan "Jay" Benson	35	Engineer	Ebonyi State	Jaykech	0	Dumped Day 42
"Nkechi" Maureen Agba	29	Marketing executive	Anambra State	Jaykech	0	Dumped Day 42
Jennifer "Jenny Koko"	26	Fabrics seller	Rivers State	Jelo	0	Dumped Day 35
"Louis" Ejiofor	33	TV content creator and producer	Delta State	Jelo	0	Dumped Day 35
Jerry	36	Actor, Designer and Entrepreneur	Delta State	Jeriton	5	Dumped Day 28
Meriton	29	Unknown	Rivers State	Jeriton	0	Dumped Day 28
"Michael" Ngene	29	Radio presenter	Enugu State	Micherry	0	Dumped Day 14
"Cherry" Osigwe	30	Medical doctor	Imo State	Micherry	0	Dumped Day 14

The premiere night is marked as Day 0. The day after is Day 1.
Initially, the contest was to last for 60 days, however due to the COVID-19 pandemic, Multichoice announced the season will end on 29 March 2020.

== Marriages ==
Chris Adah and Chris Obaoye (Double Chris) earlier held their wedding on Saturday, 26 December 2020.
