= Ultimate Love (TV series) =

Nigeria television show

- Starring: Adesuwa Onyenokwe; Dakore Egbuson-Akande; Oluwaseun P. Olaniyan
- Country of origin: Nigeria

Original release
- Network: Africa Magic channels; DStv and GOtv
- Release: 9 February 2020

Ultimate Love is a Nigerian reality competition series created by pay-TV operator, Multichoice Nigeria, for DStv. The series follows 16 random contestants (half of each gender) in a secluded venue for 8 weeks under 24-hour surveillance, until two contestants are declared the "Ultimate Couple".

== History ==
Multichoice announced auditions for its brand-new reality series on early 2019, requesting Nigerian citizens aged 23 and older. Entrants were to complete and submit an application form (specially curated by the organisers to get full knowledge of the contestants), along with a one-minute video and photos of themselves and family online on the Africa Magic website, as well as their social media platforms. Auditions closed on the 30th of November 2019.

== Format ==
The format is similar to Big Brother, with a few slight differences. 16 contestants are put in a secluded venue known as "Aunty's Love Pad" for eight weeks, during which they will spend time getting to know each other and forging relationships and completing challenges set out for them. Each week, viewers get to decide on their favourite contestants/couple. The contestants with the fewest votes will be evicted from the premises. The winning contestants are declared the " Ultimate Couple" who will receive a cash prize, a fully furnished apartment and an all-expenses paid traditional wedding.

"Aunty" takes a similar role to Big Brother, the difference being that she is occasionally in direct physical contact with the contestants, announcing the challenges, offering emotional support, announcing the winning couple and evicting the couple with the lowest votes. In season one she is portrayed by Adesuwa Onyenokwe.

== Series overview ==
Season	Premiere date	Finale date	Days	Housemates	Winner	Main presenters	Network
Ultimate Love 1	9 February 2020	29 March 2020	50	16	Roksie	Dakore Egbuson-Akande; Oluwaseun Olaniyan	Africa Magic; DStv; GOtv
