= Australian Survivor: Brains V Brawn =

Australian reality show

- Season 8
- Presented by: Jonathan LaPaglia
- No. of days: 48
- No. of castaways: 24
- Winner: Hayley Leake
- Runner-up: George Mladenov
- Location: Cloncurry, Queensland
- No. of episodes: 24

Release
- Original network: Network 10
- Original release: 18 July – 12 September 2021

Additional information
- Filming dates: 24 April – 10 June 2021

Season chronology
- ← Previous; All Stars Next → Blood V Water

Australian Survivor: Brains V Brawn is the eighth season of Australian Survivor, which aired on Network 10. This season features contestants divided into two tribes: "Brains" and "Brawn".

Due to the COVID-19 pandemic, this season was filmed domestically in Cloncurry, Queensland. It premiered on 18 July 2021 and concluded on 12 September 2021 with Hayley Leake named the winner over George Mladenov in a 7–2 vote, winning the grand prize of A$500,000 and the title of Sole Survivor. It is the sixth season to air on Network 10 and is hosted by Jonathan LaPaglia.

== Contestants ==
The 24 contestants are divided into two tribes based on their intellect or strength. The cast includes author Wai Chim, surfer Felicity "Flick" Palmateer, MMA fighter Chelsea Hackett, retired cyclist Baden Cooke and former AFL footballer Gavin Wanganeen.

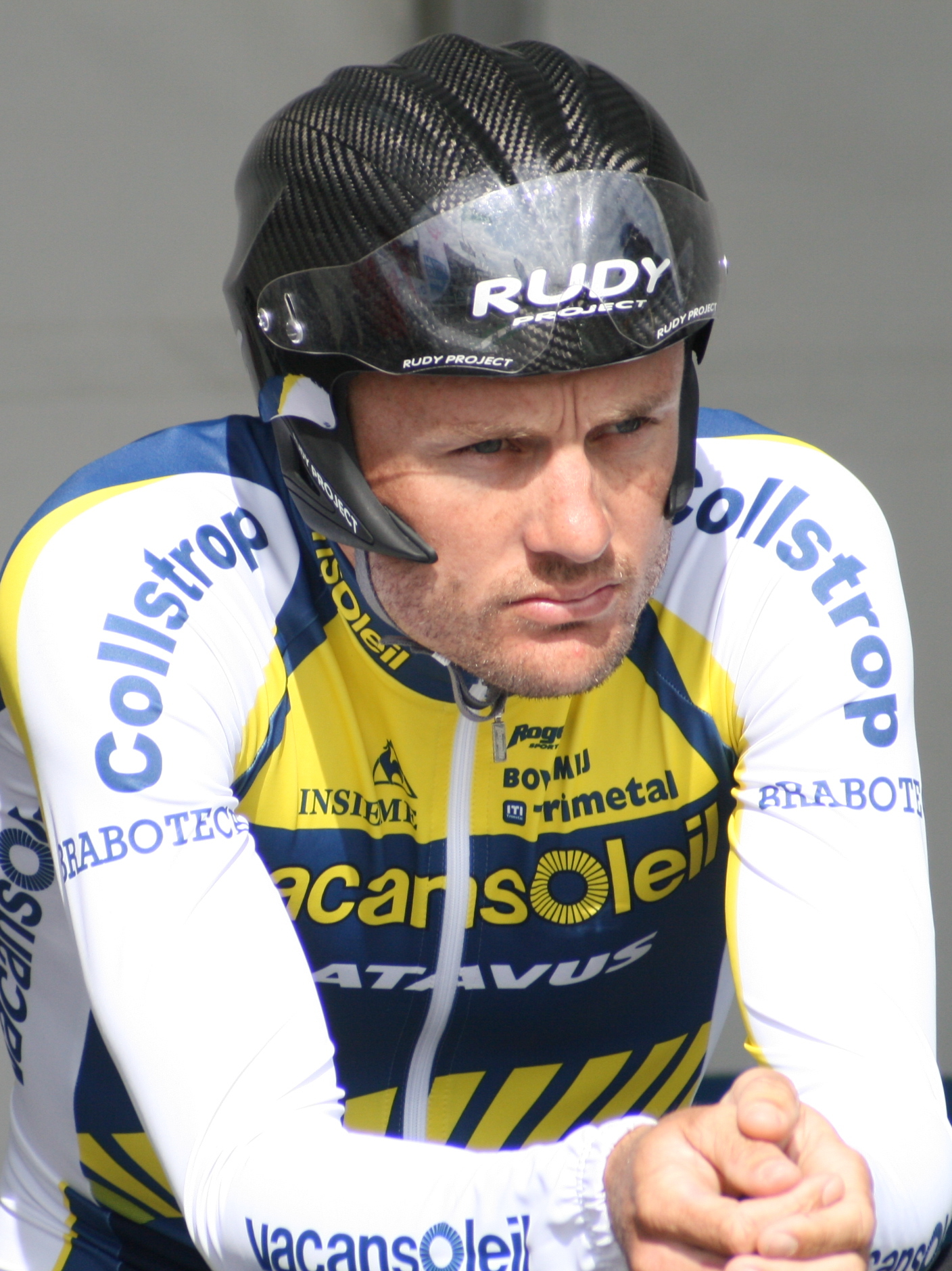
Baden Cooke

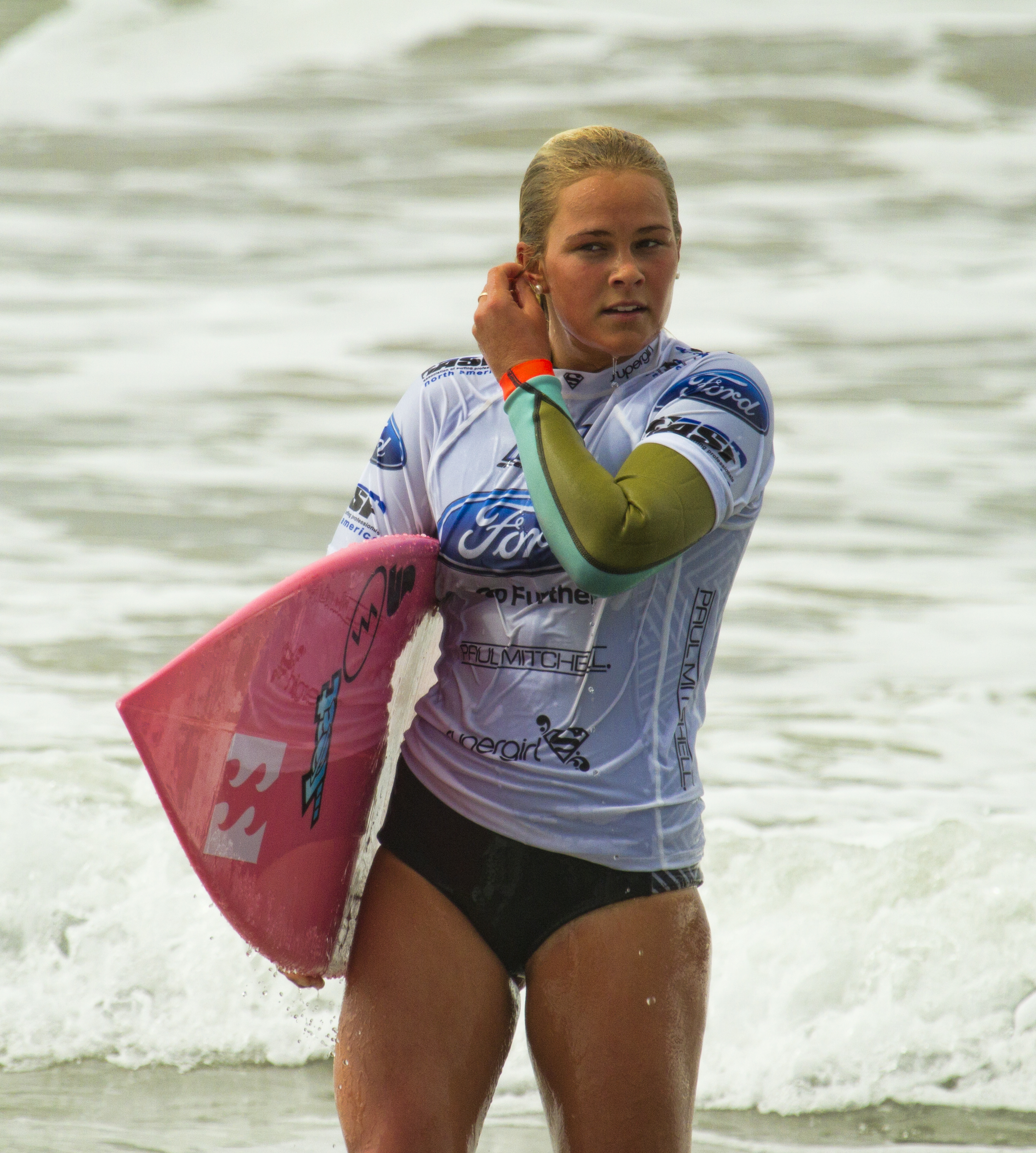
Flick Palmateer

List of Australian Survivor: Brains V Brawn contestants
| Contestant | Original tribe | Post-Swap tribes | Shuffled tribes | Merged tribe | Finish |
|---|---|---|---|---|---|
| Phil Ferguson; 28, Melbourne, VIC | Brains | | | | 1st voted out Day 2 |
| Janelle Durso; 43, Townsville, QLD | Brawn | | | | 2nd voted out Day 5 |
| Gavin Wanganeen; 48, Adelaide, SA | Brawn | | | | 3rd voted out Day 7 |
| Binyamin "Benny" Burdo; 35, Los Angeles, California, USA | Brawn | | | | 4th voted out Day 9 |
| Mitchell "Mitch" Shaw; 33, Brisbane, QLD | Brains | | | | 5th voted out Day 12 |
| Joey McCann; 35, Sydney, NSW | Brains | Brains | | | 6th voted out Day 16 |
| Daini Tuiqere; 26, Sydney, NSW | Brawn | Brawn | Brains | | 7th voted out Day 18 |
| Shannon Lawson; 30, Sydney, NSW | Brawn | Brawn | Brawn | | 8th voted out (Note: On Day 19, both Brains and Brawn attended Tribal Council to vote out a castaway. The castaways voted out of their tribe would then have their fate decided by the four Immune castaways from both tribes. If the Immune couldn't come to a decision on who to eliminate, a fire-making duel would take place. Laura and Shannon were voted out. The Immune castaways unanimously agreed to eliminate Shannon, saving Laura and returning her to the Brains tribe.); Day 19 |
| Georgia Ray; 35, Noosaville, QLD | Brains | Brains | Brains | | 9th voted out Day 21 |
| Rachel Downie; 50, Buderim, QLD | Brains | Brains | Brains | | 10th voted out Day 23 |
| Simon Mee; 31, Brisbane, QLD | Brawn | Brawn | Brawn | | 11th voted out Day 25 |
| Kerryn "Kez" McGee; 25, Busselton, WA | Brawn | Brawn | Brains | Fire | 12th voted out Day 27 |
| Chelsea Hackett; 21, Gold Coast, QLD | Brawn | Brawn | Brawn | Fire | Medically evacuated Day 31 |
| Baden Cooke; 42, Melbourne, VIC | Brains | Brains | Brawn | Fire | Lost redemption duel (Note: Baden was officially eliminated on Day 31, after two nights in Redemption Rock, when he lost his challenge duel against Hayley.); 1st jury member Day 31 |
| Gerald Youles; 26, Kilcoy, QLD | Brawn | Brawn | Brains | Fire | 15th voted out 2nd jury member Day 33 |
| Laura Wells; 36, Sydney, NSW | Brains | Brains | Brains | Fire | 16th voted out 3rd jury member Day 35 |
| Emmett Pugh; 31, Perth, WA | Brawn | Brawn | Brains | Fire | 17th voted out 4th jury member Day 37 |
| Andrew Ucles; 33, Alice Springs, NT | Brains | Brains | Brawn | Fire | 18th voted out 5th jury member Day 39 |
| Dani Beale; 34, Sydney, NSW | Brawn | Brawn | Brawn | Fire | 19th voted out 6th jury member Day 43 |
| Wai Chim; 38, Sydney, NSW | Brains | Brains | Brawn | Fire | 20th voted out 7th jury member Day 44 |
| Cara Atchison; 47, Sydney, NSW | Brains | Brawn | Brains | Fire | 21st voted out 8th jury member Day 45 |
| Felicity "Flick" Palmateer; 28, Margaret River, WA | Brawn | Brawn | Brawn | Fire | 22nd voted out 9th jury member Day 47 |
| George Mladenov; 31, Sydney, NSW | Brains | Brains | Brains | Fire | Runner-up; Day 48 |
| Hayley Leake; 31, Sydney, NSW | Brains | Brains | Brawn | Fire | Sole Survivor; Day 48 |

=== Future appearances ===
In 2023, Hayley Leake, George Mladenov, Flick Palmateer, and Simon Mee competed on Australian Survivor: Heroes V Villains, with Leake and Palmateer as heroes and Mladenov and Mee as villains. Cara Atchison also appeared in Heroes V Villains as a loved one.

In 2025, Mladenov competed on Australian Survivor: Australia V The World.

In 2026, Mee competed on Australian Survivor: Redemption.

Outside of Survivor, Mladenov appeared on Dogs Behaving (Very) Badly and competed on the seventh season of The Amazing Race Australia with his sister Pam in 2023. In 2025, Mladenov competed on Deal or No Deal. Gerald Youles competed on the second season of The Floor.

== Season summary ==
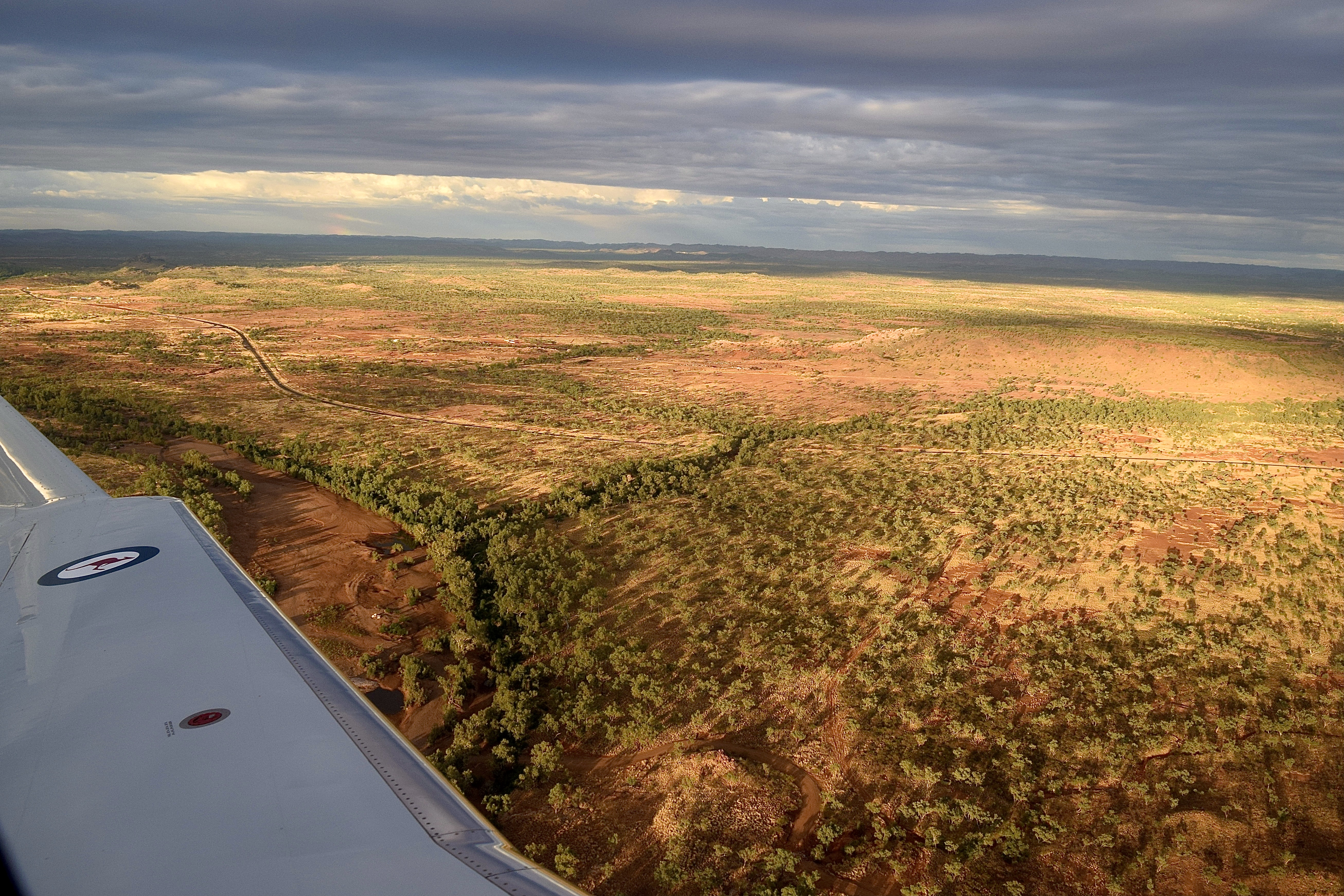
The season filmed in Cloncurry, Queensland.

The 24 contestants were divided into two tribes based on their intellect (Brains) or strength (Brawn). On the Brains tribe, George found himself in the minority early and was the primary target of the majority alliance led by Joey. Just before the swap, George was saved when Hayley flipped on Joey. On the Brawn tribe, Shannon and Simon butted heads early and competed for control as the tribe culled its weak challenge performers.

After a tribe swap, George reconnected with Cara and joined Emmett’s Brawn majority to eliminate the Brains players who had previously betrayed them. On the new Brawn tribe, Simon succeeded in voting out Shannon after Hayley caused the Brawn to turn on each other; however, Simon was then blindsided after revealing he had two hidden immunity idols.

At the merge, George and Cara continued working with the Brawn, led by Emmett and Dani. However, George acted as a double agent, feeding information to the Brains minority as the Brawn sought to eliminate them. He orchestrated several key eliminations, with more advantages gifted to him, including Hayley, who later won her way back into the game in a redemption duel. After Emmett and Dani turned on each other, George and Cara rejoined the Brains to eliminate the remaining Brawn.

Hayley won four individual immunity necklaces down the stretch, including at the final three to eliminate Flick, a huge social threat. She and George faced the jury, where George highlighted his dominant strategic play while Hayley emphasised her all-around strategic, physical and social game. The jury agreed that Hayley had the more well-rounded game and voted in her favour 7-2, awarding her the $500,000 and the title of Sole Survivor.

Challenge winners and eliminations by episode

Tribal phase (Days 1–25)
| Episode | | Challenge winner(s) | | Eliminated | Finish |
| No. | Original air date | Reward | Immunity | Eliminated | Finish |
|---|---|---|---|---|---|
| 1 | 18 July 2021 | Brawn | Brawn | Phil | 1st voted out Day 2 |
| 2 | 19 July 2021 | Brawn | Brains | Janelle | 2nd voted out Day 5 |
| 3 | 20 July 2021 | Brawn | Brains | Gavin | 3rd voted out Day 7 |
| 4 | 25 July 2021 | Brawn | Brains | Benny | 4th voted out Day 9 |
| 5 | 26 July 2021 | Brawn | Brawn | Mitch | 5th voted out Day 12 |
| 6 | 27 July 2021 | Brawn | Brawn | No elimination on Day 14 due to a fake tribal council (Note: Instead of voting out a player, Brains unknowingly voted for a player to swap to the Brawn tribe. Cara rejoined the game as a member of the Brawn tribe.) | |
| 6 | 27 July 2021 | [Joey] (Note: The Brawn tribe was told to invite a castaway from the Brains tribe on their reward; they chose Joey.) | Brawn | No elimination on Day 14 due to a fake tribal council | |
| 7 | 1 August 2021 | Brains | Brawn | Joey | 6th voted out Day 16 |
| 8 | 2 August 2021 | None (Note: No Reward Challenge, due to Tribe Swap.) | Brawn | Daini | 7th voted out Day 18 |
| 9 | 3 August 2021 | Emmett, Rachel (Note: As both Brains and Brawn were to attend Tribal Council on Day 19, each tribe competed among themselves for individual immunity. Andrew, Emmett, Rachel and Wai won their tribe's immunity challenge.) | | Shannon | 8th voted out (Note: Both Brains and Brawn attended Tribal Council on Day 19. After Laura and Shannon were voted out by their respective tribes, the Four Immune players had to unanimously decide who to eliminate. The saved person returned to their tribe and remained in the game, while the other was eliminated. If they could not come to a decision, a fire-making duel would take place. Laura was saved by the Immune and returned to Brains, eliminating Shannon.); Day 19 |
| 9 | 3 August 2021 | Andrew, Wai | | Shannon | 8th voted out Day 19 |
| 10 | 8 August 2021 | Brains | Brawn | Georgia | 9th voted out Day 21 |
| 11 | 9 August 2021 | None | Brawn | Rachel | 10th voted out Day 23 |
| 12 | 10 August 2021 | Brains | Brains | Simon | 11th voted out Day 25 |

Individual phase (Days 26–48)
| Episode | | Challenge winner(s) | | Eliminated | Finish |
| No. | Air date | Reward | Immunity | Eliminated | Finish |
|---|---|---|---|---|---|
| 13 | 15 August 2021 | George (Note: Each player was given the right to pick their merge feast meal upon completion of the challenge; while there was no designated winner, George was the first to complete the challenge and had first choice.) | Emmett | Kez | 12th voted out Day 27 |
| 14 | 16 August 2021 | None | Emmett, Andrew, Dani (Note: There were three immunity necklaces up for grabs in the immunity challenge. After the challenge, it was revealed that the three winners would also be the only contestants who would have the opportunity to vote at tribal, however, at the tribal council it was revealed only one of the winners would vote and that the winners would participate in a fire-making duel to determine who would cast the vote.) | Baden | 13th voted out Redemption Rock (Note: On Days 29 and 30, instead of voting a castaway out of the game, the Fire tribe unknowingly voted to send castaways to Redemption Rock. Hayley and Baden were each voted out on the respective days and had to compete against each other in a duel on Day 31 to determine who would return to the game. Hayley won the duel, officially eliminating Baden from the game.); Day 29 |
| 15 | 17 August 2021 | None | Emmett | | |
| 15 | 17 August 2021 | None | Emmett | Hayley | 14th voted out Redemption Rock; Day 30 |
| 15 | 17 August 2021 | None | Emmett | Chelsea | Medically evacuated Day 31 |
| 15 | 17 August 2021 | None | Emmett | Baden | Lost Redemption Duel; 1st jury member Day 31 |
| 16 | 22 August 2021 | Dani, Flick, Gerald, Laura, Wai | Andrew | Gerald | 15th voted out 2nd jury member Day 33 |
| 17 | 23 August 2021 | None | Andrew, Hayley, Emmett, Flick, George (Note: There were 5 individual immunities up for grab. The bottom four of the challenge were the only ones able to receive a vote at Tribal Council.) | Laura | 16th voted out 3rd jury member Day 35 |
| 18 | 24 August 2021 | Dani [Andrew, Emmett, Flick] | Hayley | Emmett | 17th voted out 4th jury member Day 37 |
| 19 | 29 August 2021 | Cara, (Note: The Challenge was contested in two teams of three. Cara did not have a team and therefore did not compete. As Cara had correctly guessed the winning team, she joined them on the reward.); Dani, Flick, Wai | Hayley | Andrew | 18th voted out 5th jury member Day 39 (Note: On Days 39, Johnathan introduced four urns at Tribal Council which would be opened by the next four voted out castaways – one urn had a save scroll, which allowed the voted out player to stay in the game. On Day 41, Flick chose the correct urn and stayed in the game.) |
| 20 | 30 August 2021 | None | Dani | No elimination on Day 41 due to save scroll. | |
| 21 | 31 August 2021 | Dani [Flick, Hayley] | Wai | Dani | 19th voted out 6th jury member Day 43 |
| 22 | 5 September 2021 | None | Hayley | Wai | 20th voted out 7th jury member Day 44 |
| 23 | 6 September 2021 | None | Flick | Cara | 21st voted out 8th jury member Day 45 |
| 24 | 12 September 2021 | None | Hayley | Flick | 22nd voted out 9th jury member Day 47 |
| 24 | 12 September 2021 | | | Final vote | |
| 24 | 12 September 2021 | | | George | Runner-up; Day 48 |
| 24 | 12 September 2021 | | | Hayley | Sole Survivor; Day 48 |

== Episodes ==
| No. overall | No. in season | Title | Timeline | Original release date |
|---|---|---|---|---|
| 151 | 1 | "Episode 1" | Days 1–2 | 18 July 2021 |
This season, 12 intelligent Brains take on 12 strong Brawn in Cloncurry, Queensland for another exciting season of Australian Survivor that will test whether the mind or the body will outlast the others. The tribes immediately compete in their first reward challenge when they meet.: Reward challenge: Teams retrieve a key and have a choice between chopping a log or solving a puzzle. They then spin a giant wheel with spokes and move puzzle pieces to spell their tribe's name on each arm. The first tribe to complete this has a choice between a survival kit including fruit, vegetables, rope and a tarpaulin or fire in the form of flame.; Brawn wins Reward and chooses the survival kit. Back at camp, Brawn begins to second guess their decision on picking the survival kit as they fail to get fire started on their first night. Simon takes some of the heat for this as he advocated for taking the kit, told the others he could get fire, and he failed. Brawn endures a very cold, miserable first night. On Brains tribe, Mitch is perceived as the leader of camp. Discussion of keeping the tribe physically strong causes concern with tribe members Wai and George over whether they will be voted out first. George resents Mitch taking a leadership role and believes he is taking the tribe in the wrong direction. While walking by the well, George finds an advantage that allows him to give himself and five other tribe members Immunity from their first Tribal Council. The six immune tribe members will not vote and will instead leave Tribal Council, leaving the other six people vulnerable to be voted out.: Immunity challenge: Teams will race across a ramp and net, untying a ladder from the course. They will climb up to a deck, get into a cart, and race down to the bottom. From there, they will climb up a rope to release four balls. They will use a slingshot to launch all four balls into a net. The first tribe to land their balls into the net wins Immunity.; Brawn wins Immunity. At Brains tribe, Mitch leads a discussion about voting Wai out of the tribe due to her poor performance at the Immunity Challenge and the perception that she is physically weakest. Wai is aware she is on the chopping block and her and George attempt to turn the tide against Mitch for being a strong social threat and the leader of the tribe. George also considers playing his advantage, but is concerned that if he does then Mitch might not be voted out. At Tribal Council, the discussion centers on whether the Brains tribe should keep physically stronger tribe members or whether people should be given a chance to excel in other challenges. Mitch advocates for a strong tribe, but George advocates against voting people out only based on strength. George criticizes Mitch's leadership and his tribe for not giving him a chance to shine in the first challenge and believes people are not being given a chance to show their strengths. Before the vote, George decides to play his advantage and decides to save Rachel, Baden, Cara, Georgia, and Wai. The six leave Tribal Council. The remaining six are stunned by the change of events as Wai or George was the intended target. After the votes are cast, the other five voters believe that Phil is the physically weakest of the group and has fewer social connections with the other five. In a 5-1 vote, Phil becomes the first person voted out of Australian Survivor.
| 152 | 2 | "Episode 2" | Days 3–5 | 19 July 2021 |
At Brains, the tribe is still in shock over George's advantage play. Wai is grateful to still be in the game and thanks George for saving her. George hopes that he can form a six-person alliance with the people he saved, admitting that he saved people he believed were weaker and vulnerable players. However, George voices those feelings to Rachel and Georgia, causing Rachel to be insulted. While George hoped to build trust, everyone on the tribe believes that George is just trying to run the game, acted in his own self-interest, and not many are keen to align themselves with him. At Brawn, Emmett is finally able to start a fire. The tribe believes they've started the game well and hope to continue their winning streak.: Reward challenge: Contestants face off against one another to collect a bag and get it into a marked square to win a point. The first tribe to win three points wins a fishing kit, salt & pepper and a loaf of bread with honey.; Brawn wins Reward. During the final round, Emmett had an easy chance to win, but he taunted Joey long enough to be tackled. Emmett still wins the round, but made the challenge closer than it should have been. Back at camp, Janelle is unimpressed with Emmett's behavior during the challenge and believes him to be arrogant. At Brains, George expresses frustration with his tribe that he tried to volunteer for the challenge, but he was ignored. George believes he could have won one of the rounds for his tribe. Baden notes it is the round he won for the tribe and confronts George. George again argues he is not being given a chance, but Baden believes George is just being selfish and not looking out for the tribe's best interest. George begins to realize that he doesn't have the allies he was hoping for and believes he is in trouble if Brains lose another Immunity Challenge.: Immunity challenge: The tribes will swim out to a deck, climb a ladder, and roll over a spinning ladder into the water. They will then use a stick to hit balls out of a net and push them up a chute to release a key. The key will unlock a hanging fish puzzle that the tribes will have to compete. First tribe to finish the puzzle will win Immunity.; Brains win Immunity. At Brawn, the tribe discusses voting Janelle out for her performance on the puzzle and the belief that she will be a challenge liability. There is also discussion among tribe members that Simon, Emmett, and Gavin have formed a strong trio and might need broken up. Janelle advocates for Emmett to be voted out for his arrogance at the reward challenge and for being a huge threat, which surprises Emmett when he hears his name. However, Simon overhears Shannon talking about keeping the ladies together and Simon believes Shannon is going to lead the women against his alliance down the road. Simon attempts to organize a blindside against Shannon and recruits Emmett, Gavin, Chelsea, and Dani. Flick finds herself as the swing vote as both voting blocs against Shannon and Janelle try to recruit her for her vote. At Tribal Council, Janelle acknowledges that she's on the hot seat, but argues she is not the only challenge liability and has useful skills for the tribe. Janelle takes a jab at Emmett for almost losing the reward challenge by showing off. Emmett argues that he never would have lost the challenge. Janelle also calls out Simon, Emmett, and Gavin for being a strong trio. Emmett questions why his name was mentioned as a vote off, but he doesn't get much of an answer. After the votes are cast, Flick decides to join the vote against Janelle. Janelle becomes the second person voted out of Australian Survivor.
| 153 | 3 | "Episode 3" | Days 6–7 | 20 July 2021 |
At Brawn, Simon contemplates where the votes went wrong on his attempt to blindside Shannon. Gavin notes that he accidentally voted the wrong way because he was confused on whether Shannon or Janelle was the target, but he does not tell Simon this for fear of losing his trust. Flick states that she didn't vote with Simon's group because she believed she would be on the bottom of his alliance and she believes she can work with Shannon moving forward. An alliance forms between Flick, Shannon, and Kez with the intention of breaking up Simon, Emmett, and Gavin at the next Tribal Council. At Brains, the tribe has gone six days without a fire. Andrew leads an effort to build a fire so they can cook their food, but George believes they'll be wasting strength for the Reward Challenge. Andrew pushes forward and is able to finally start a fire for Brains.: Reward Challenge: Two members from each tribe will hold up a trough. Two other members will be guarding the front of the trough while the remaining tribe members will try to throw buckets of water past them and into the trough. Eventually, the trough will become too hard to hold and one tribe will drop it. The last tribe holding up their trough will win a Coffee and Tea Reward.; Brawn wins their third Reward in a row. At the Reward site, they find pictures of their families and loved ones. The tribe shares an emotional afternoon talking about their families. When they return, Kez comes upon a clue for a hidden immunity idol. At Brains, the tribe has not been getting much nourishment with no rewards or fire. The tribe ventures out to catch some fish and are successful in catching a few small fish.: Immunity Challenge: Tribes will solve a giant brainteaser to release a ring and use it to climb over a wall. They will then make their way over rope steps, retrieve sandbags, and use them to knock down a tower of blocks. They will then have to stack those blocks on a seesaw and keep the stack standing for three seconds after the seesaw levels. The first tribe to complete this will win Immunity.; George finally gets his time to shine when he figures out the brainteaser and gives Brains a massive lead. Brains win Immunity. At Brawn, Flick, Shannon, and Kez talk to Benny, Big D, and Gerald about a six person alliance to vote off Gavin to break up the boys alliance and keep the tribe strong. Simon observes that Flick has turned on his group, but hopes to find another way to succeed in blindsiding Shannon. Simon approaches Big D to join his five person alliance with Emmett, Gavin, Chelsea, and Dani. When Kez sees Simon talking to Big D, she worries that he might flip and decides to search for the idol. Kez finds the idol, but because of the little clothing she is wearing, she must sneak it back to camp and manages to succeed. Big D finds himself the swing vote for the night. Big D attempts to sway Simon's group to vote for Kez instead of Shannon as he finds her to be a bigger threat. Simon agrees to change the vote to prove his trust to Big D. At Tribal Council, the tribe discusses their poor performance in the challenge. Simon admits that he was blindsided at the last vote. There is discussion that the tribe is truly divided in half and tonight will determine which side takes control. Kez teases that there might be a snake in the grass, tonight, and Emmett and Shannon express confidence that their sides will take the numbers tonight. After the votes are cast, Kez senses she is in danger and plays her idol, negating five votes against her. However, Big D decides to go along with the plan to eliminate Gavin. With 6 votes, Gavin becomes the third person voted out of Australian Survivor.
| 154 | 4 | "Episode 4" | Days 8–9 | 25 July 2021 |
At Brawn, Simon, Emmett, Chelsea, and Dani realize that Big D played double agent and they are now in the minority of the tribe. Simon believes he is the next target and begins looking for the idol. At Brains, while the tribe longs for a reward win, they are happy to have avoided Tribal Council twice. While most believe the tribe has a good dynamic, almost everyone still believes George doesn't fit in with the tribe and is on the outs. George is aware of this and hopes to find an idol to shake up the game again. Baden believes the tribe is underestimating George's ability to play the game and tails him as he searches for the idol. While doing so, Baden finds an idol clue.: Reward Challenge: While tethered in pairs, teams will race through a web of obstacles to get their tribe-colored ball and attempt to shoot it into a basket. The first tribe to three points will win a comfort reward of pillows, blankets, a hammock, and bacon and eggs.; Brawn wins their fourth reward in a row. At Brains, Mitch observes that while Brains have lost all the rewards, Brawn has lost more Immunities. Mitch hopes that Brawn continues to feel overconfident at the Immunity Challenges and continue to lose. Baden continues his idol hunt, but George follows him and knows Baden is idol searching. After Baden walks by an area, George searches it and finds the idol in a tree. George shares his discovery with Wai and, while she is excited, she also worries how this affects her position in the tribe.: Immunity Challenge: Tribes will carry a heavy cage through an obstacle course and gather puzzle pieces. They will race up a ramp, climb out of the cage, over a wall, down a cargo net, and then throw a rope to pull together a wooden bridge. At their puzzle station, they will solve a word puzzle. First to solve the puzzle wins Immunity.; Brains win their third Immunity Challenge in a row. At Brawn, Simon and Big D believe that Benny is to blame for the challenge loss because he moved puzzle pieces around and didn't communicate. While Shannon's alliance targets Simon, Simon's alliance hope to flip a few of them to vote Benny out. Things are further complicated when Benny reveals to Dani that Simon is the target, which makes Shannon's alliance worry about an idol play. Simon attempts a pitch to Shannon and Big D that Brawn needs to vote Benny out to stay strong and he can provide more in the challenges. As Brawn arrives at Tribal, Shannon, Kez, and Flick whisper over who to vote for. There is discussion of whether Benny is at fault for losing the challenge. There is discussion of whether the vote should be based on alliances or based on overall challenge performance. Simon pitches that Benny will continue to hurt them in challenges while he will help Brawn win and get them majority for the merge. Benny argues that Simon is saying whatever he can to stay in the game. Shannon and Big D both admit they are conflicted over the vote, which startles Benny because he thought he had a solid alliance. Benny tries to pitch his loyalty to his alliance. When the votes are cast, Big D is revealed to have gone against his alliance, voting for Benny and resulting in a 5–5 tied vote between Benny and Simon. On the revote, Kez and Shannon decide to vote Benny out and keep Simon. Benny becomes the fourth person voted out of Australian Survivor.
| 155 | 5 | "Episode 5" | Days 10–12 | 26 July 2021 |
On Brawn, Gerald questions his alliance's decision to turn on Benny but hopes they can still have majority on the tribe. Simon knows that he narrowly dodged a bullet last night and continues his idol search. Simon finds the idol in a tree. On Brains, a four-person alliance has formed between Joey, Laura, Andrew, and Georgia. The group plans to vote George out next because he doesn't fit in with the tribe and they find him to be untrustworthy.: Reward Challenge: Tribe members will square off one on one in a log rolling competition and try to stay on the log longer than the other tribe. The first tribe to score three points will win a reward of toasties.; Brawn wins their fifth reward in a row. While the tribe enjoys their reward, Simon discovers some sacks he hopes to use for fishing. When he picks them up, he feels an idol inside and grabs it. Simon now has two idols in his possession. However, Gerald spots Simon grab this idol and worries how Simon is now a bigger threat than he was previously. On Brains, Baden continues his search for the idol which George already found. George knows that Baden is not in a majority alliance and still hopes to recruit him despite their differences. George decides to tell Baden that he found the idol. Baden notes that he still has problems trusting George, but he believes George is a strong player and decides to join an alliance with him, Wai, and Cara. George believes he is now gaining ground in the game and hopes to have some numbers if Brains goes to Tribal again.: Immunity Challenge: Teams will release a series of balls. The entire tribe will have to race through a course to catch the balls down a chute. Once everyone catches a ball, each tribe member will have to roll it through a raised chute, race through a mud pit, and then shoot the balls into a hanging frame. First tribe to land all of their balls wins Immunity.; Brawn wins Immunity. During the challenge, George had struggled to get his ball through the chute. Back at camp, Joey believes it will be an easy vote tonight as the majority of the tribe is ready and eager to vote George out. However, George decides to shake up camp prior to Tribal by openly wearing his idol. The tribe is taken aback and realize they now need to make a new plan. The four-person alliance decides to target Mitch because they believe he is hiding in the middle and will emerge as a threat later because he's been such a good leader and will recruit allies easier. George, Wai, Baden, and Cara decide to target Laura because they believe she has strong social connections and it would tear apart the four-person alliance. Both groups attempt to recruit Hayley and Rachel towards their side and Hayley and Rachel find themselves as swing votes for the night. At Tribal, the tribe discusses the alliances growing in the tribe and George affecting the vote tonight by revealing his idol. Joey and George exchange a few words back and forth regarding George's position and unpopularity with the tribe. George states that the tribe needs a good bloodletting, tonight. Hayley acknowledges that the vote, tonight, will be based on trust and who people want to work with moving forward. After the votes are cast, George plays his idol for himself. It only negates one vote from Mitch. In the end, Hayley and Rachel decide to join the four-person alliance with their plan to blindside Mitch. Mitch becomes the fifth person voted out of Australian Survivor.
| 156 | 6 | "Episode 6" | Days 13–14 | 27 July 2021 |
On Brawn, Gerald informs his alliance that Simon found an idol. The group hopes they can flush his idol before Simon becomes too powerful of a player. On Brains, George is disappointed that his plan to vote out Laura failed. George confronts Rachel for her betrayal last night and criticizes her for lying to him. Some believe that George is acting like a poor sport. They hope the next Tribal Council will be the time they get rid of George.: Reward Challenge: Tethered to a rope, the tribes will dig under a log, weave through obstacles, and unlock a box of sandbags. Two people will use the sandbags to smash six clay baskets. First tribe to smash all six will win Lamingtons and chocolate milk.; Brawn wins their sixth reward in a row. They are allowed to pick one member from Brains to join them and they pick Joey. Brawn hopes that Joey will spill some information about the Brains. At the Reward, Joey does share that George is on the outs and what happened with last night's Tribal. At Brains, Rachel confronts George about his negative comments he made about the tribe at the Reward Challenge. Rachel believes George is a constant negative energy in the tribe and he put the tribe down today. George does not take the criticism well and storms off. Georgia follows him with the dual purpose of calming him down and making sure he doesn't find the idol. George can tell what Georgia is trying to do and sets his sights on targeting her next.: Immunity Challenge: One member of each tribe will run out to a pontoon to collect one of five keys. They'll then hang onto a board and the remaining tribe members will use a winch to wheel them back to the puzzle mat. Once the five keys are collected, they can unlock their puzzles pieces and solve a puzzle containing an image on their tribe flag. First tribe to complete the puzzle wins Immunity.; At Brains, the majority six plan to vote out George. George and Cara search for the idol, knowing it is the only way to keep their alliance intact. Cara finds the idol in a tree. The two tell Baden and Wai about their idol discovery and the four intend to target Georgia. Laura and Rachel suspect that George or Cara found an idol and they do not have enough numbers to split the vote with no risk. The majority talk to Wai to see if she will flip and vote with them to split up George and Cara. Wai is conflicted because she does appreciate George for saving her at the first Tribal, but she believes George's game can be a little too volatile. Wai does admit to George, Cara, and Baden that she is unsure of what to do. George tries to convince Wai that she is being played by the other side and reminds her that he saved her. George, Cara, and Baden discuss playing Hot Potato with the idol, passing it around to confuse the others on who it will be played for. At Tribal Council, Cara openly wears her idol and her, George, and Baden pass it around to each other throughout Tribal. Joey accuses George of being the bad egg on the tribe. Wai states the dynamics on the tribe are fluid and the alliances are not set tonight. George discusses about how the game has changed him and is content to go out knowing he played true to himself. George pleads with Wai to vote with him, stating that he saved her because he felt she was a genuine person. After the votes are cast, Cara decides to play her idol on George, which moves him to tears over the gesture. Cara's idol negates four votes against George. However, Wai flips on her alliance and joins the majority to force a tie between Cara and Georgia after splitting their votes. On the revote, Cara is voted out of the tribe. However, after she leaves Tribal, she comes upon a lit torch with a Brawn buff and a sign indicating she was voted out of the tribe, but not out of the game. Cara will join the Brawn tribe. Therefore, nobody is voted out of the game this episode.
| 157 | 7 | "Episode 7" | Days 15–16 | 1 August 2021 |
| 158 | 8 | "Episode 8" | Days 17–18 | 2 August 2021 |
| 159 | 9 | "Episode 9" | Day 19 | 3 August 2021 |
| 160 | 10 | "Episode 10" | Days 20–21 | 8 August 2021 |
| 161 | 11 | "Episode 11" | Days 22–23 | 9 August 2021 |
| 162 | 12 | "Episode 12" | Days 24–25 | 10 August 2021 |
| 163 | 13 | "Episode 13" | Days 26–27 | 15 August 2021 |
| 164 | 14 | "Episode 14" | Days 28–29 | 16 August 2021 |
| 165 | 15 | "Episode 15" | Days 30–31 | 17 August 2021 |
| 166 | 16 | "Episode 16" | Days 32–33 | 22 August 2021 |
| 167 | 17 | "Episode 17" | Days 34–35 | 23 August 2021 |
| 168 | 18 | "Episode 18" | Days 36–37 | 24 August 2021 |
| 169 | 19 | "Episode 19" | Days 38–39 | 29 August 2021 |
| 170 | 20 | "Episode 20" | Days 40–41 | 30 August 2021 |
| 171 | 21 | "Episode 21" | Days 42–43 | 31 August 2021 |
| 172 | 22 | "Episode 22" | Day 44 | 5 September 2021 |
| 173 | 23 | "Episode 23" | Day 45 | 6 September 2021 |
| 174 | 24 | "Episode 24" | Days 46–48 | 12 September 2021 |

== Voting history ==
Tribal Phase (Days 1–25)

| | Original Tribes | | | | | | | | Post-Swap Tribes | Switched Tribes | | | | | | |
| Episode # | 1 | 2 | 3 | 4 | | 5 | 6 | | 7 | 8 | 9 (Note: Both Brains and Brawn attended Tribal Council on Day 19. After a person had been voted out by their respective tribes, the Four Immune players must unanimously decide whom to eliminate. If they could not come to a decision, a fire-making duel would take place. Laura and Shannon were voted out. Laura was saved by the Immune and returned to Brains, eliminating Shannon.) | | | 10 | 11 | 12 (Note: Cara found an Advantage that allowed her to select two members of the winning tribe to vote at the losing tribe's Tribal Council. She selected herself and George.) |
|---|---|---|---|---|---|---|---|---|---|---|---|---|---|---|---|---|
| Day # | 2 | 5 | 7 | 9 | | 12 | 14 | | 16 | 18 | 19 | | | 21 | 23 | 25 |
| Eliminated | Phil | Janelle | Gavin | Tie (Note: The Tribal Council vote resulted in a tie. Per the rules, a second vote was held where the castaways involved in the tie would not vote and the remaining castaways could only vote for those who tied.) | Benny | Mitch | Tie | Cara (Note: On Day 14, unbeknownst to the Brains, the voted out castaway, Cara, would join the Brawn tribe.) | Joey | Daini | Laura | Shannon | Shannon | Georgia | Rachel | Simon |
| Votes | 5–1 | 7–4–1 | 6–0 (Note: Kez played a hidden immunity idol on herself, therefore five votes against her were negated.) | 5–5 | 6–2 | 6–4–0 (Note: George played a hidden immunity idol on himself, therefore one vote against him was negated.) | 3–3–0 (Note: Cara played a hidden immunity idol for George, therefore four votes against him were negated.) | 6–2 | 5–3–1 | 3–2–1–0 (Note: Laura played a hidden immunity idol for Rachel, therefore three votes against her were negated.) | 5–2 | 6–2–1 | Consensus | 5–3 | 3–2–2 | 6–3–1 |
| Voter | Vote | | | | | | | | | | | | | | | |
| Hayley | Phil | | | | | Mitch | ~~George~~ | Cara | Joey | | | Shannon | | | | Dani |
| George | Immune (Note: George played an advantage allowing him to save himself and an additional five castaways from the first tribal council. Saved castaways immediately left tribal council and were unable to cast a vote or have votes cast against them.) | | | | | Laura | Georgia | Georgia | Joey | Georgia | Laura | | | Georgia | Rachel | Simon |
| Flick | | Janelle | Gavin | Simon | Simon | | | | | | | Chelsea | | | | Simon |
| Cara | Immune | | | | | Laura | Georgia | None (Note: Cara and Georgia were ineligible to vote in the revote.) | | Laura | Laura | | | Georgia | Laura | Simon |
| Wai | Immune | | | | | Laura | ~~George~~ | Cara | Joey | | | Shannon | Shannon | | | Simon |
| Dani | | Shannon | ~~Kez~~ | Benny | Benny | | | | | | | Shannon | | | | Simon |
| Andrew | Phil | | | | | Mitch | Cara | Cara | George | | | Shannon | Shannon | | | Dani |
| Emmett | | Shannon | ~~Kez~~ | Benny | Benny | | | | | ~~Rachel~~ | Laura | | Shannon | Georgia | Rachel | |
| Laura | Phil | | | | | Mitch | Cara | Cara | Wai | Daini | Cara | | Saved | Cara | Emmett | |
| Gerald | | Janelle | Gavin | Simon | Simon | | | | | ~~Rachel~~ | Laura | | | Georgia | Rachel | |
| Baden | Immune | | | | | Laura | Georgia | Georgia | Joey | | | Flick | | | | Dani |
| Chelsea | | Shannon | ~~Kez~~ | Benny | Benny | | | | | | | Shannon | | | | Simon |
| Kez | | Janelle | Gavin | Simon | Benny | | | | | Georgia | Laura | | | Georgia | Laura | |
| Simon | | Shannon | ~~Kez~~ | Benny | None (Note: Benny and Simon were ineligible to vote in the revote.) | | | | | | | Shannon | | | | Flick |
| Rachel | Immune | | | | | Mitch | ~~George~~ | Cara | Joey | Daini | Cara | | Shannon | Cara | Emmett | |
| Georgia | Immune | | | | | Mitch | ~~George~~ | None | George | Daini | Sick Day (Note: Due to medical intervention by production, Georgia did not attend Tribal Council but not be deemed unable to continue with the game. As she could not attend Tribal Council, she could not vote, nor be voted out.) | | | Cara | | |
| Shannon | | Janelle | Gavin | Simon | Benny | | | | | | | Chelsea | Sent | | | |
| Daini | | Janelle | Gavin | Benny | Benny | | | | | ~~Rachel~~ | | | | | | |
| Joey | Phil | | | | | Mitch | Cara | Cara | George | | | | | | | |
| Mitch | Phil | | | | | ~~George~~ | | | | | | | | | | |
| Benny | | Janelle | Gavin | Simon | None | | | | | | | | | | | |
| Gavin | | Janelle | ~~Kez~~ | | | | | | | | | | | | | |
| Janelle | | Emmett | | | | | | | | | | | | | | |
| Phil | Hayley | | | | | | | | | | | | | | | |

Individual phase (Day 26–48)

| | Merged tribe | Redemption Twist (Note: On Days 29 and 30, instead of voting a castaway out of the game, the Fire tribe unknowingly voted to send 2 castaways to Redemption Rock. Hayley and Baden were each voted out on the respective days and had to compete against each other in a duel on Day 31 to determine who would return to the game. Hayley won the duel, officially eliminating Baden.) | | | | Merged tribe | | | Save Scroll Twist (Note: On Days 39, Johnathan introduced four urns at Tribal Council which would be opened by the next four voted out castaways - one urn had a save scroll, which allowed the voted out player to stay in the game. On Day 41, Flick found the save and stayed in the game.) | | Merged tribe | | | | |
| Episode # | 13 | 14 | 15 | | | 16 | 17 | 18 | 19 | 20 | 21 | | 22 | 23 | 24 |
|---|---|---|---|---|---|---|---|---|---|---|---|---|---|---|---|
| Day # | 27 | 29 | 30 | 31 | | 33 | 35 | 37 | 39 | 41 | 43 | | 44 | 45 | 47 |
| Eliminated | Kez | Baden | Hayley | Chelsea | Baden | Gerald | Laura | Emmett | Andrew | Flick | Tie | Dani | Wai | Cara | Flick |
| Vote | 4–1–0 (Note: Hayley played a hidden immunity idol on Laura, therefore eight votes against her were negated.) | 1 (Note: Andrew, Dani and Emmett were originally the only ones allowed to vote for winning immunity, until it was revealed only a fire making challenge would decide which 3 of them had the sole vote to eliminate anyone not immune. Dani won and cast the sole vote.) | 9–1 | Evacuated | Challenge | 5–4–0 (Note: Flick played a hidden immunity idol for Emmett, therefore one vote against him was negated.) | 1–0 (Note: George played a secret immunity idol on Cara, therefore eight votes against her were negated.) | 4–3–1 | 4–2–1 | 4–2–0 | 2–2–2 | 3–0–0 | 2–1–0 (Note: Flick played a hidden immunity idol on herself, therefore two votes against her were negated.) | 2–1–1 | 1–0 |
| Voter | Vote | | | | | | | | | | | | | | |
| Hayley | Kez | None (Note: This castaway was ineligible to vote due to losing the episode's immunity challenge.) | Andrew | Redemption | Win (Note: Baden lost to Hayley in the redemption rock duel, eliminating him from the game.) | Gerald | ~~Cara~~ | Emmett | Andrew | Flick | Flick | Dani | ~~Flick~~ | Cara | Flick |
| George | ~~Laura~~ | None | Hayley | | | Gerald | ~~Cara~~ | Emmett | Andrew | Flick | Dani | Dani | Wai | Cara | None (Note: This contestant was only able to vote for one other contestant, thus they were not eligible to vote.) |
| Flick | ~~Laura~~ | None | Hayley | | | Dani | ~~Cara~~ | George | George | George | Cara | None (Note: Cara, Dani and Flick were ineligible to vote in the revote.) | George | Hayley | None |
| Cara | ~~Laura~~ | None | Hayley | | | Dani | Laura | Emmett | Andrew | Flick | Flick | None | Wai | George | |
| Wai | Kez | None | Hayley | | | Gerald | ~~Cara~~ | Emmett | Andrew | Flick | Dani | Dani | ~~Flick~~ | | |
| Dani | ~~Laura~~ | Baden | Hayley | | | ~~Emmett~~ | ~~Cara~~ | Cara | George | George | Cara | None | | | |
| Andrew | Kez | None (Note: Andrew and Emmett were ineligible to vote due to losing the fire making challenge, along with the nine who were already ineligible to vote, due to losing the immunity challenge.) | Hayley | | | Gerald | ~~Cara~~ | George | Flick | | | | | | |
| Emmett | ~~Laura~~ | None | Hayley | | | Dani | ~~Cara~~ | George | | | | | | | |
| Laura | Dani | None | Hayley | | | Gerald | ~~Cara~~ | | | | | | | | |
| Gerald | ~~Laura~~ | None | Hayley | | | Dani | | | | | | | | | |
| Baden | Kez | None | Redemption | | Lose | | | | | | | | | | |
| Chelsea | ~~Laura~~ | None | Sick Day (Note: Due to medical intervention by production, Chelsea did not attend Tribal Council but was not deemed unable to continue with the game. As she could not attend Tribal Council, she could not vote, nor be voted out.) | | | | | | | | | | | | |
| Kez | ~~Laura~~ | | | | | | | | | | | | | | |

Final vote
| Episode # | 24 | |
|---|---|---|
| Day # | 48 | |
| Finalist | Hayley | George |
| Vote | 7–2 | |
| Juror | Vote | |
| Flick | Hayley | |
| Cara | | George |
| Wai | Hayley | |
| Dani | Hayley | |
| Andrew | Hayley | |
| Emmett | Hayley | |
| Laura | | George |
| Gerald | Hayley | |
| Baden | Hayley | |

== Reception ==
=== Ratings ===
Ratings data is from OzTAM and represents the viewership from the 5 largest Australian metropolitan centres (Sydney, Melbourne, Brisbane, Perth and Adelaide).

| Week | Episode | Air date | Overnight ratings | | Consolidated ratings | | Total ratings | | Source |
| Week | Episode | Air date | Viewers | Rank | Viewers | Rank | Viewers | Rank | Source |
|---|---|---|---|---|---|---|---|---|---|
| 1 | 1 | 18 July 2021 | 752,000 | 4 | 72,000 | 3 | 824,000 | 4 | |
| 1 | 2 | 19 July 2021 | 768,000 | 7 | 71,000 | 5 | 839,000 | 6 | |
| 1 | 3 | 20 July 2021 | 730,000 | 9 | 66,000 | 5 | 797,000 | 6 | |
| 2 | 4 | 25 July 2021 | 563,000 | 11 | 68,000 | 2 | 632,000 | 11 | |
| 2 | 5 | 26 July 2021 | 627,000 | 13 | 67,000 | 5 | 694,000 | 13 | |
| 2 | 6 | 27 July 2021 | 618,000 | 11 | 99,000 | 1 | 717,000 | 9 | |
| 3 | 7 | 1 August 2021 | 568,000 | 11 | 64,000 | 3 | 635,000 | 11 | |
| 3 | 8 | 2 August 2021 | 603,000 | 13 | 72,000 | 4 | 675,000 | 13 | |
| 3 | 9 | 3 August 2021 | 595,000 | 15 | 119,000 | 1 | 714,000 | 13 | |
| 4 | 10 | 8 August 2021 | 609,000 | 10 | 69,000 | 4 | 678,000 | 9 | |
| 4 | 11 | 9 August 2021 | 618,000 | 11 | 71,000 | 4 | 689,000 | 12 | |
| 4 | 12 | 10 August 2021 | 664,000 | 9 | 99,000 | 3 | 763,000 | 7 | |
| 5 | 13 | 15 August 2021 | 664,000 | 6 | 68,000 | 7 | 732,000 | 7 | |
| 5 | 14 | 16 August 2021 | 733,000 | 8 | 56,000 | 6 | 789,000 | 8 | |
| 5 | 15 | 17 August 2021 | 682,000 | 9 | 83,000 | 4 | 767,000 | 7 | |
| 6 | 16 | 22 August 2021 | 691,000 | 6 | 43,000 | 9 | 740,000 | 5 | |
| 6 | 17 | 23 August 2021 | 699,000 | 8 | 41,000 | 8 | 741,000 | 8 | |
| 6 | 18 | 24 August 2021 | 689,000 | 8 | 78,000 | 4 | 767,000 | 6 | |
| 7 | 19 | 29 August 2021 | 676,000 | 7 | 47,000 | 8 | 723,000 | 6 | |
| 7 | 20 | 30 August 2021 | 690,000 | 9 | 48,000 | 7 | 737,000 | 9 | |
| 7 | 21 | 31 August 2021 | 707,000 | 7 | | | | | |
| 8 | 22 | 5 September 2021 | 689,000 | 5 | 40,000 | 6 | 729,000 | 7 | |
| 8 | 23 | 6 September 2021 | 761,000 | 7 | 34,000 | 6 | 795,000 | 9 | |
| 9 | 24 (Note: The final episode was coded into two programs - the first titled "Grand Finale" and the second titled "Winner Announced". Because of this, two separate sets of ratings were produced.) | 12 September 2021 | 785,000 | 7 | | | | | |
| 9 | 24 | 12 September 2021 | 923,000 | 6 | | | | | |

While the season was lauded by some,
