= TV Edukasi =

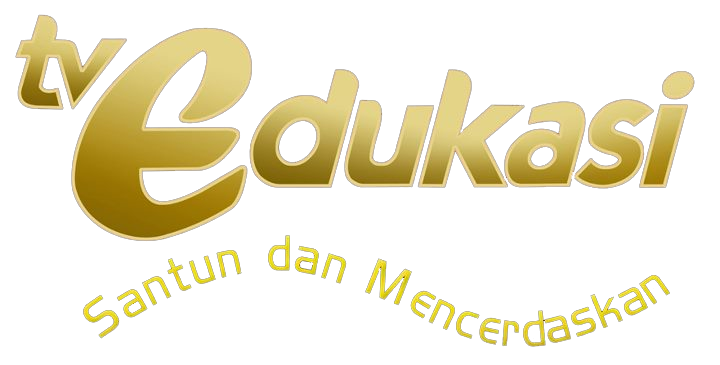
- Country: Indonesia
- Broadcast area: Free to Air (through affiliates)/Cable/Satellite
- Headquarters: Pustekkom Building, Jl RE Martadinata KM 15.5 Ciputat, South Tangerang

Programming
- Picture format: 1080i (HDTV)

Ownership
- Owner: Ministry of Education, Culture, Research, and Technology
- Sister channels: Radio Edukasi AM 1251 kHz Yogyakarta

History
- Launched: 12 October 2004; 21 years ago
- Closed: 1 February 2023; 3 years ago
- Former names: TVE

Links
- Website: tve.kemdikbud.go.id

TV Edukasi first logo (2004-2013)

TV Edukasi (Educational TV, formerly TVE) was an Indonesian television station owned by Ministry of Education, Culture, Research, and Technology. It served to spread information to the education sector.

== History ==
The station was made official by the Minister of National Education Abdul Malik Fadjar on 12 October 2004.

As a part of widening TVE's reach to larger Indonesian audiences, TVE partnered with Indonesian public television network TVRI — under the partnership the TVE daytime broadcasts was relayed by TVRI starting in 2004. The partnership ends in the early 2010s. In 2021, a programming block Belajar dari Rumah which was aired in the same partnership in midst of COVID-19 pandemic in Indonesia was moved to the station after almost a year in TVRI.

Starting February 1, 2023, TV Edukasi stopped airing on three live streaming platforms: IndiHome TV (also through IPTV services), Vidio, and MAXStream.

== Affiliations ==
- Space Toon (2005–2013)
- TVRI (2004–2014)
- Sindo TV (2014–2015)
- O Channel (2004–2012)

== See also ==
- List of television stations in Indonesia
- MNCTV
