= Washington Backcountry Discovery Route =

The Washington Backcountry Discovery Route is a 600-mile (970 km), mostly off-road trail traversing the Cascade Mountains in the U.S. state of Washington. The entire route is double track suitable for motorized users (four-wheel drive automobile or dual-sport motorcycle) and non-motorized users (mountain bike). The route was created by Bryce Stevens and Andrew Cull. In 2007 Steve Bisig of Pacific Northwest Adventures successfully completed and published a 4x4 route from the Oregon to Canadian border that consisted of more off-road trails (Washington Cascades Overland Tour).

Backcountry Discovery Routes is a 501(c)(4) education and advocacy non-profit that supports off-road route development and dissemination of route information to riders on the Washington Backcountry Route and others in Utah, Colorado, Arizona, and Idaho. The state of Oregon has a collection of five interconnected routes that are similar to the Washington Route and was created in the late 1990s by the Oregon Off Highway Vehicle Association.

== Bibliography/Videography ==
Butler Maps has produced a map of the route in association with Helge Pedersen and others, and Noren Films has produced a documentary DVD about the mapping expedition.

- Washington Backcountry Discovery Route Map, Butler Maps, ISBN 9780984559084
- Sterling Noren (Director); Andrew Cull, Paul Guillien, Tom Myers, Helge Pedersen, Bryce Stevens (Riders) (2011). Washington Adventure Backcountry Discovery Route (DVD). Noren Films/distributed by Touratech. ISBN 978-0-9830443-2-1. Archived from the original on 2014-11-17.
