= Belajar dari Rumah =

Indonesian educational television programming

- Network: TVRI (2020–2021); TV Edukasi (2021–2023)
- Launched: April 13, 2020
- Country of origin: Indonesia
- Owner: Ministry of Education and Culture, Republic of Indonesia
- Format: Education
- Running time: 180 minutes (morning block); 120 minutes (evening block)
- Original language: Indonesian
- Official website: bersamahadapikorona.kemdikbud.go.id/surveibdr/

Belajar dari Rumah (Study from Home or Learning from Home, abbreviated as BDR) was an Indonesian educational programming block created by the Ministry of Education and Culture to facilitate education via television during the COVID-19 pandemic. Originally aired in partnership with the Indonesian public television network TVRI, the block was moved to TV Edukasi starting in April 2021.

On weekdays, Belajar dari Rumah consisted of preschool program and instructional programming for all school levels (primary school, junior high school, and senior high school) as well as parenting program and selected national movies on primetime. On weekends, the block shows educational and cultural programming for all ages.
