= Environmental Quality Management =

Environmental engineering company

Environmental Quality Management, Inc. (EQM) is an environmental engineering and remediation company headquartered in Cincinnati, Ohio that has been active in providing environmental remediation support in response to terrorist attacks, the space shuttle disaster, superfund site cleanup, hazardous chemical spills and natural disasters.

== History ==
EQ was established in 1990, to provide nationwide environmental consulting, engineering, and remediation/restoration services from its offices throughout the country. In addition to its Cincinnati headquarters, EQM has offices in Chicago, Illinois; Denver, Colorado; Durham, North Carolina; Las Vegas, Nevada; New Orleans, Louisiana; Pittsburgh, Pennsylvania; Portland, Oregon; Roanoke, Virginia; Sacramento, California; San Antonio, Texas; and Seattle, Washington. According to the July 7 issue of Engineering News Record’s (ENR) listing of The Top 200 Environmental Firms, EQ is currently ranked as the 43rd largest environmental firm in the US; the 17th largest in hazardous waste projects, the 16th largest overall governmental environmental contractor, and the 9th largest “All Environmental” firm in the US.

The company provides services in the following areas:

- Air Quality Services
- Emergency Response
- Environmental Management
- Industrial Hygiene
- Steel
- Cement

== World Trade Center site monitoring study ==
EQM conducted a monitoring study of residential buildings located north and southwest of Ground Zero to determine the presence of dioxins, PCBs, inorganic metals, and asbestos. EQM made recommendations to ensure proper cleanup of the asbestos-contaminated dust and to reduce the exposure of cleanup personnel and occupants returning to buildings.

The company assisted in coordination of NIEHS-WETP grantee activities at the WTC Site, assessed the current safety and health status of response personnel working at the WTC Site, evaluated the current Site safety and health plans or programs and related aspects such as exposure monitoring with respect to worker protections, and performed a preliminary training needs assessment specific to the WTC Site activities.

EQ assisted in the mobilization of response resources, including coordination with the New York City Building and Construction Trades Council and the Construction Employers Association, Bechtel Corporation (the contractor responsible for developing the overall WTC Disaster Site Safety and Health Plan), and other parties with respect to the training programs that could be promptly provided by the grantee organizations.

The assessment of the safety and health status at the Site was based on on-site observations and analysis of the WTC Disaster Site Worker Injury and Illness Surveillance Update Reports issued by the City Health Department.

== Anthrax emergency response cleanup ==
The Hart Senate Office Building was closed on October 17, 2001, when aides to Senate Majority Leader Tom Daschle opened an anthrax-laced letter in his office. Several other congressional office buildings also showed evidence of anthrax contamination and had to be fumigated.

Responding to these life-threatening hazards, EQ was on site at Capitol Hill within 24 hours with crews and equipment to develop biocidal treatment of Bacillus Anthracis endospores. EQM led, developed, and trained multiple contractors to deal with personnel, equipment, and gasification decontamination.

EQM developed “Sampling for Anthrax” training. EQM also designed, constructed, and staffed modular multi-chamber decontamination containment systems in three locations in the Hart Senate Office Building. EQM refined construction units to make them quicker to assemble during daily setup and tear-down. EQM developed handbooks, established Standard Operating Procedures, and taught specialized decontamination procedures.

== Space Shuttle Columbia recovery ==
The Space Shuttle Columbia broke up on re-entry over Texas on February 1, 2003. Within hours of the Columbia disaster, U.S. EPA Region 6 used its Emergency and Rapid Response Services (ERRS) contract to contact EQM for help in the recovery effort. The company responded immediately by dispatching a crew to the Dallas/Fort Worth area. Before long, EQM and its team had 75 trained response personnel in the field assisting with the recovery effort. The EQM team was involved with tagging and retrieving the debris and transporting it to a secure location.

Due to concerns over hazardous exposures and site disturbances, the company was under pressure to rapidly accomplish and secure recovery. EQM’s staff worked in conjunction with many different local, state, and federal personnel to meet the goal of a quick and complete recovery of the shuttle remains.

This project was conducted over a 500-square-mile (1,300 km^{2}) area centered on Texas and Louisiana. Chemical hazards encountered included hydrazine and nitrogen tetroxide, in addition to risks of explosive, flammable, corrosive, and reactive materials.

As a result of this important effort, EQM was honored on July 10, 2003 in Washington, D.C. at the U.S. EPA’s 15th Annual Small & Disadvantaged Business Awards ceremony. The award recognized EQ for its outstanding accomplishments in recovering debris from the Space Shuttle Columbia.

== Environmental cleanup response to Hurricanes Katrina and Rita ==
EQM provided environmental cleanup and waste management services in eight parishes in Louisiana affected by Hurricane Katrina and Hurricane Rita. The company was an integral part of the search and rescue operation.

Days after Hurricane Katrina devastated New Orleans and the neighboring Gulf Coast, the Federal Emergency Management Association (FEMA) tasked EQM (through its U.S. EPA Region 6 Emergency & Rapid Response Services contract) to conduct a search and rescue mission, followed by debris removal and cleanup of hazardous waste in the hardest-hit areas.

The company immediately dispatched 120 people (employees and subcontractors) to assist with the effort. At the height of the rescue mission, the EQM team was working 15 to 18 hours a day and living in a tent city. Sixty boats were deployed continuously from New Orleans to various parishes in an effort to search for survivors and bring them to shore.

After the search and rescue effort was completed, the company turned its attention to removing debris and hazardous waste. The work involved identifying, labeling, packaging, and arranging transportation and disposal of massive amounts of household waste, manufacturing and refinery waste, and large appliances containing refrigerants.
