= Adesuwa Onyenokwe =

Nigerian journalist

- Born: Adesuwa; August 8, 1963 (age 63); Ibadan, Oyo State, Nigeria
- Citizenship: Nigeria
- Education: Obafemi Awolowo University; University of Ibadan
- Occupation: Journalist
- Known for: television personality; Writer; motivational speaker; Journalist
- Spouse: Ikechukwu Onyenokwe
- Children: 6

Adesuwa Onyenokwe (born August 8, 1963, in Ibadan) is a Nigerian television personality. She was a former presenter at NTA before becoming an editor for the magazine "Today's Woman". She is a talk show host of the program "Seriously Speaking" which came on air in 2014. She is a motivational speaker and elocution trainer, living in Lagos Nigeria.

== Early life and education ==
Onyenokwe was born on August 8, 1963, in Ibadan, Oyo state, Nigeria to a family of 11 children. She is the 5th child. She attended Emotan Preparatory School, and Idia College, both in Benin City, Edo State. She then proceeded to study drama at the Obafemi Awolowo University (OAU) in Ile-Ife, Osun State, Nigeria. After her first degree at OAU, she went further to obtain a master's degree in Language Arts at the University of Ibadan. Whilst at her first degree programme, she was one of the lucky ones to have been tutored by Professor Wole Soyinka, a Nobel Laureate. She married Ikechukwu Onyenokwe an engineer and management consultant from Ndokwa East Local Government Area of Delta State in 1988. The couple have 6 children.

== Career ==
Her father wanted her to be a lawyer but Adesuwa had always dreamed of the big screen from childhood. Adesuwa Onyenokwe first contact with broadcasting was when she was posted by the National Youth Service Corp (NYSC) to serve in Nigerian Television Authority (NTA) station in Sokoto State in 1983. The head of Presentation Unit of the station at that time, Mr. Danladi Bako, selected her to present the kiddies programme on television. That was her first appearance as a presenter in television. When she finished the National Service in 1984, she left Sokoto State and accepted employment as a teacher at Akenzua II Grammar School, Benin, Edo State. In 1985, she moved back to broadcasting when she accepted employment at the then Bendel Broadcasting Service which was later changed to be called Edo Broadcasting Service (EBS). When she married in 1988, she left Benin City to join her husband who was living in Lagos. She then resigned from Edo Broadcasting Service and joined Nigerian Television Authority (NTA) in Lagos

She presented many programmes in NTA. She was the presenter NTA magazine show called Newsline. The programme was aired every Sunday by 9pm in place of the daily Network news. One of her most memorable assignments in NTA was when she was assigned to cover the visit of the Catholic Pontiff, Pope John Paul II to Nigeria in 1998. She retired after 15 years of working with NTA. In 2000 she started a half-hour independent production on TV titled “Today’s Woman with Adesuwa”. Nigerian Television Authority (NTA) however granted her airtime on credit which allowed her to commence the programme. The programme ran for 10 years before it ended.

In 2007, Adesua Oyenokwe launched Today's Women magazine, a lifestyle magazine for women. She is the Publisher and Editor-in-Chief of the magazine. She is also the host of a TV show: “TW Conversations,” which is aired on Africa Magic channel of DSTV. She organized and hosted a presidential chat with the President of the Federal Republic of Nigeria Goodluck Ebele Jonathan in February 2015. She also comperes for several high-profile events in Nigeria. Adesuwa commenced another TV show, Seriously Speaking in July 2014. The show was aired on Channels TV and hosted a long list of celebrities, public figures and notable guests. On 10 August 2016, Adesua Onyenokwe launched her VLOG series ‘Speaking my mind with Adesuwa’. The first series of the VLOG was titled ‘Identity’ where she discussed how Nigerian experiences and background can define its citizens much more than can be imagined. The programme was launched to celebrate her 53rd birthday. She was chosen by Multichoice Nigeria owners of DSTV and GOtv, a direct to home pay TV, to play the role of Aunty a central character on its reality TV show Ultimate Love, which premieres on February 9, 2020, at 7:30pm WAT on DStv and GOtv. She is a figure on topical issues like relationships, health and wellness in Nigeria.
