= Television in Singapore =

Television broadcasting in Singapore began on 15 February 1963. Public broadcaster Mediacorp, owned by the Singaporean government investment company Temasek Holdings, currently holds a monopoly on terrestrial television channels in the country. In addition, Pay-TV services are available from private operators such as StarHub TV and Singtel TV. Historically, the private ownership of satellite dishes was prohibited.

== History ==
=== Background (1952–1963) ===
The introduction of television in Singapore began with experimental closed-circuit broadcasts during the British Radio Exhibition in August 1952, organised by the British Radio and Accessories Manufacturing Association (BRAMA). British electronics company Pye supplied the equipment and set up a temporary studio, with Governor J. F. Nicoll delivering the first televised speech. The exhibition attracted significant public attention, reaching an estimated 400,000 viewers, around 40% of Singapore's population at the time.

Although the Singaporean population had become aware of television technology, the government opposed a privately operated television service, favouring public ownership. In late 1952, a preliminary proposal estimated the initial cost of a state-run service at around $1 million, which would be funded through licence fees. Although private companies such as Cathay Organisation, Shaw Brothers, and Rediffusion submitted bids to operate a commercial station, all were rejected.

In 1956, the Legislative Assembly's proposal for commercial television faced strong opposition, notably from Lee Kuan Yew and Chief Secretary William Goode. Critics cited concerns about commercial exploitation, poor quality programming, and its potential influence on youth, who made up half the population. The government subsequently abandoned the commercial model and commissioned a study into establishing a government-run service.

By the early 1960s, the government sought technical expertise from Japan's NHK and Australia's ABC. Recommendations included a multilingual service using the 625-line CCIR standard. Contracts were awarded to the British Marconi Company for transmission and studio equipment, and to the Singaporean-Japanese company Marubeni-Iida for outside broadcast vehicles. The Ministry of Culture would operate the service, which was named Television Singapura. Staffing and equipment shortages postponed the target launch date from December 1962 to early 1963.

=== Television Singapura/Radio and Television Singapore (1963–1980) ===
On 3 January 1963, the Singaporean government announced pilot programming would begin on February 15. The station would broadcast on VHF Channel 5 in the 625-line television standard. The licencing fee would be $24 per year ($2 per month). Pilot programming was initially less than two hours a day but had extended to four hours by April.

A second channel began broadcasting between August and September 1963. By March, programmes were offered in English and Hokkien. The service expanded to include Mandarin, Malay, Tamil, and other non-Mandarin varieties. By April, regular broadcasts were available in all of Singapore’s official languages.

A temporary studio was built at Caldecott Hill, Radio Singapore's headquarters. Bukit Batok was the site of the television transmitter. The staff included experienced workers from the United Kingdom, Australia, and Japan. Television set manufacturers were asked to ensure their presets matched Channels 5 and 8 before service began.

As planned, Television Singapore launched its pilot service on 15 February 1963. Minister for Culture S. Rajaratnam became the first person to appear on Singapore TV, announcing that, "[that night] might well mark the start of a social and cultural revolution in [the lives of Singaporeans]." After his speech, the station televised a 15-minute documentary, TV Looks at Singapore, produced by Television Singapura. Two cartoons, a news report, a newsreel, a comedy show, and a local variety show followed.

At the time, it was estimated that only 1 in 58 people in Singapore owned a TV set, and the pilot service offered only one hour of broadcasting per day on Channel 5. In March 1963, a local branch of the Australian company Ferris Industries began to manufacture television aerials in Singapore. That same month, Rajaratnam said that Television Singapore had the ambition to be "one of the best" in the world, "with the co-operation of the public." Despite these stated goals, there was strong criticism that television gave undue prominence to English and non-Mandarin Chinese varieties, with so little time given to programming in Malay and Tamil. In late March, a campaign was initiated to install television sets in bars, restaurants, and coffee shops. By then, one week ahead of the start of regular broadcasts, the channel was broadcasting for three-and-a-half hours daily. At the beginning of April, a Straits Times survey showed that television was now available in as many as 7,000 Singaporean households. By August, the number of television sets had risen to 16,000.

On 2 April 1963, President Yusof Ishak officially inaugurated the regular service of Television Singapura. It began broadcasting from 7:15 p.m. to 11:15 p.m. nightly, showing programming in Singapore's four official languages (English, Mandarin and other Chinese varieties, Malay, and Tamil). Following the launch, it was suggested that television should be used "wisely," and not "as a drug."

Channel 8 began its test transmissions on Saturday, 31 August 1963, on Malaysia's national day (known then as Solidarity Day). Its first day consisted of a Hokkien film, repeats of India's participation in the South East Asian Cultural Festival, and Singapore Celebrates. A second test transmission took place between September 16 and 20, the same year, and devoted much of its time to the week-long celebrations, coinciding with the historic Proclamation of Malaysia and the political campaigns leading up to the 1963 General Election.

Channel 8 started regular broadcasts on 23 November 1963. At first, the channel aired for just two and a half hours each day, signing off at 10:10 p.m., with plans to match Channel 5's broadcasting hours the following year. As with Channel 5, its output was in a mix of every language of the time. Commercial advertising was allowed on Channel 5 starting 15 January 1964. Both channels aired during the brief time Singapore was a state of Malaysia, from that year to 9 August 1965, airing together with TV Malaysia from the Klang Valley and Kuala Lumpur areas. From that day of independence, when then-Prime Minister Lee Kuan Yew addressed Singaporeans, both channels became the national TV stations. They later formed the TV Division of Radio Television Singapore (RTS).

Television also had its critics. Universal Pictures' head, Milton Rackmil, while in Singapore in 1964, said that television was luring its viewers away from cinema and that viewers should return to cinema once the novelty wore off. Initially, television sets only received channels 5 to 10 in the VHF band (where the two Singaporean channels broadcast). However, in preparation for the start of Television Malaysia's relay station in Johor Bahru (which was on channel 3), and following complaints from viewers that they were unable to receive the station, all television sets sold in Singapore would receive all channels in the VHF band (1 to 11) from 9 December 1964.

On 1 May 1965, Television Malaysia Singapura started carrying four news bulletins a day, in each of the four official languages. The weekly total became 28, up from 16.

When Setron opened its new facility in April 1966, one out of six households had a television set, mostly due to rising incomes. A purpose-built television facility was opened on 26 August 1966, at a cost of $3.6 million. By that time, TV Singapura had experienced significant growth and developed recognition abroad. Its news bulletins received praise for the quality of its reports, and films shot by the news division were already being seen in the UK and Australia, with increasing demand from other countries. The new facility would also cater to the needs of the Educational Television Service, which was set to start early the following year.

Starting on 30 January 1967, Channel 8 also became home to the Educational Television Service, which showed TV programmes produced by the Ministry of Education on school subjects at different educational levels and in the four national languages. The block time slot would eventually be transferred to Channel 12 in 1993, under the CDIS (Curriculum Development Institute of Singapore) brand.

In 1970, the two RTS channels were broadcasting a weekly sum of 106 hours of programming.

Speculation emerged in 1972 that a third television channel would begin operating in Singapore, when on 13 January that year, the Centre for Production and Training of Adult Education Television (CEPTA TV) suggested that the new channel was to be used to boost adult education. The government said the following day that it had no plans to start the channel.

RTS revised its two television channels on 30 March 1973. Channel 5 would broadcast in English and Malay, and Channel 8 in Chinese and Tamil. This arrangement would last for the next twenty years. Around this time, roughly half of its programming was imported. The United Kingdom and the United States were the primary sources, yet there was a substantial amount of imports from West Germany, Hong Kong, and Australia.

In January 1974, RTS purchased two colour television transmitters from Marconi, worth $700,000. They were to be installed at Bukit Batok, which underwent an expansion to accommodate them; by April, RTS was receiving a $7 million order to install colour equipment. At the same time, RTS warned potential colour set buyers on purchasing sets capable of receiving UHF signals, as ETV planned to launch its own channel on UHF channel 27, independent from RTS's two VHF channels and projected to start producing its own programmes in colour by at least 1976. Test broadcasts with recorded programming were first held on 2 May 1974, consisting of test films and imported colour programming (such as The Mary Tyler Moore Show). On 7 July 1974, Channel 5 presented its first live colour broadcast, the 1974 FIFA World Cup Final. The first locally produced colour broadcast—the ninth Singapore National Day Parade—aired on 9 August. The second phase of the pilot colour service began on 11 November 1974, with newsreels being converted to colour. The number of weekly hours given to colour programming increased from two hours to four on weekdays and from four hours to six on weekends. The news would only be converted to colour in 1975 when the commissioned purpose-built colour studio was scheduled to open.

Starting on 1 July 1978, in line with the introduction of the Singapore government's Speak Mandarin Campaign, skits and advertisements on TV no longer used non-Mandarin Chinese varieties. On 30 October 1979, the Hong Kong drama Heaven Sword and Dragon Sabre (倚天屠龙记 or Yee Tin To Long Kei) became the first program in a non-Mandarin Chinese variety to be dubbed in Mandarin before its Singaporean broadcast. The Mandarin dub received negative feedback from Cantonese-language speakers, with RTS receiving over 100 letters from viewers about the decision, with one viewer noting that the dubs caused such productions to lose their "character and authenticity".

=== Singapore Broadcasting Corporation (1980–1994) ===
On 1 February 1980, Radio Television Singapore (RTS) was succeeded by a new entity, the Singapore Broadcasting Corporation (SBC), through an act of Parliament. Unlike RTS, which operated under the Ministry of Culture, SBC would operate as an autonomous state-owned enterprise, similar to the BBC in the United Kingdom. The new structure aimed to reduce the administrative burden in expanding television and radio services in Singapore. Through this restructuring, the SBC retained a virtual monopoly on television programming in Singapore.

In 1983, SBC launched SBCText, a teletext service. On 31 January 1984, a third free-to-air TV channel, Channel 12, which would focus on educational and cultural programming, was inaugurated by Minister for Culture S. Dhanabalan.

SBC introduced NICAM stereo broadcasts in 1985, beginning with Channel 5 that August, and Channel 12 in December. That same year, it also invested in upgrades to its production facilities in order to support the format. It would take more than a decade before all channels were fully in stereo sound, beginning with the 1990 National Day celebrations.

In September 1993, SBC, with its eye on a series of changes in the following year, announced that it would increase the amount of local content and broadcasting hours, with channels 5 and 12 being the initial targets. It was also decided that SBC 8 would remain under the existing Chinese and Tamil format.

=== Privatization, expansion of channels (1994–present) ===
On 18 December 1991, Brigadier General George Yeo, as the Minister of Information and the Arts, announced a two-year plan to privatize SBC. Its three television channels were to be sold to two or three separate companies. The plans for that were delayed in March 1993, with the end of 1994 becoming the new target goal. It was announced in late August 1994 that a fourth free-to-air television channel, set to use the UHF band, was going to start the following year, absorbing the cultural format of Channel 12. The plan also outlined the conversion of Channel 5 to an English-language service, Channel 8's conversion to an all-Chinese service, and the move of Channel 8's Tamil output to Channel 12.

SBC's successors would be set to face commercial competition from Singapore Telecom and the NTUC. The two companies would also act as channel providers for the cable network. 1 January 1994 saw the debut of Singapore International Television, a rented time slot on the Indonesian Palapa B2P satellite, intending to target overseas Singaporeans in Southeast Asia.

On 1 October 1994, SBC was privatized as the holding company Singapore International Media (SIM), with both Channel 5 and Channel 8 brought under the subsidiary. The Television Corporation of Singapore (TCS) and Channel 12 operated under the subsidiary Singapore Television Twelve. On 1 September, 1995, Channel 8 switched exclusively to Mandarin-language programming, Channel 12 relaunched as Prime 12 (which would focus on Malay and Tamil programming), and the new UHF channel Premiere 12 launched; the new channel would be devoted to the arts, children's programming, and sports.

On 1 March 1999, TCS launched a free-to-air news channel, Channel NewsAsia (CNA). On 15 June 1999, SIM was renamed to the Media Corporation of Singapore (MediaCorp). On 30 January 2000, Television Twelve relaunched Prime 12 as Suria, now focusing exclusively on Malay programming. Premiere 12 would be concurrently relaunched as Central. The new channel would be split into three blocks: Arts Central, Kids Central, and Vasantham Central, which feature Tamil-language programmes. On 28 September 2000, CNA expanded its carriage and programming to target the Asia–Pacific region.

In May 2001, the Singapore government granted new free-to-air licences to SPH MediaWorks, a subsidiary of publisher Singapore Press Holdings, breaking the virtual monopoly that had existed. The company launched two channels, TVWorks (later renamed Channel i) and Channel U, with English and Chinese programming respectively. Channel U started broadcasting on May 6 and TVWorks followed on 20 May.

In late 2004, citing financial difficulties and a limited market for English-language programming, SPH sold its television channels to MediaCorp. As a result, Channel i was shut down at the end of the year, while Channel U continued to operate as a complement to Channel 8.

In March 2008, it was announced that Central would be split into two standalone channels: the Tamil-language Vasantham, and Okto, a new channel containing a mixture of children's and arts programmes. The new channels launched on October 19. In June 2014, Okto also began to carry sports coverage.

On 1 May 2019, Okto was replaced by a branded daytime block on Channel 5 under the Okto branding. The physical slots formerly occupied by the Okto channel (and also by TVWorks/Channel i) were discarded.

== Cable and Fibre-optic television ==
In 1992, Singapore's first pay TV company, Singapore Cable Vision (SCV), began offering news and entertainment channels while progressively rolling out the construction of its cable TV network across Singapore. The network was completed in 1999. Initially SCV provided a three-channel encrypted UHF network, with the first channel (NewsVision) going live on 2 April and the other 2 (MovieVision and VarietyVision) on 1 June. When the regular cable service launched, SCV provided thirty channels. SCV had about 1,500 subscribers in 1992 and became a standard practice for StarHub users. StarHub also has a different package for its fibre internet service. On 1 October 2002, Singapore Cable Vision merged with Singapore telecommunications company StarHub to create StarHub Cable Vision, a pay TV service with more than 40 international channels of news, movies, entertainment, sports, music, and education. The service has been known as StarHub TV since 2007.

On 20 July 2007, telecommunications provider SingTel began offering a digital pay TV service, Singtel TV, through its broadband network. The Internet Protocol television (IPTV) had 26 channels, including on-demand channels.

In November 2019, StarHub completed the transition of its subscribers to a new fibre-optic network and IPTV-based television service, which offered increased capacity for high-definition channels, and other new features.

== Internet television ==
In 2006, MOBTV (MediaCorp Online Broadband Television) was launched as MediaCorp's first subscription-based video on demand service that provides viewers with access to various TV programmes via immediate digital streaming or download from an Internet connection. MOBTV ceased its operation on 30 March 2010, while its services were merged to another website, xinmsn, a joint-venture between MediaCorp and MSN Singapore, which was launched earlier that month. The rest was rebranded to SingTel mio TV under MobTV Select in 2012 until 7 January 2014, (the MobTV Select was pulled from SingTel TV on October 8 as well). However, other applications, such as StarHub GO, SingTel TV GO, and Dash, were also launched in lieu of the closure.

In 2013, MediaCorp launched another internet TV service, Toggle, later rebranded as meWATCH in 2020. Until Xinmsn's closure on 1 April 2015, both OTT websites co-existed.

Other international catch-up or on-demand services available in Singapore include RTMKlik, tonton, RTB GO, TVRI Klik, Vidio, Vision+, Netflix, Amazon Prime Video, Apple TV, Sun NXT, Eros Now, Catchplay+, iQIYI, Viu, WeTV, Hayu, DAZN, HBO Max, Crunchyroll, SonyLIV, ZEE5, Hotstar, Disney+, VMX, Viva One, Pilipinas Live Plus, iWant, GMA Play, BBC Player, SPOTV NOW, beIN SPORTS CONNECT, Rakuten Viki, Bilibili, Mango TV, TVB Anywhere+, YuppTV and Youku.

== Digital television ==
In 1999, Europe's DVB-T standard was selected for future digital terrestrial television service in Singapore, and the DVB-C standards were later selected as the recommended format for digital cable.

On 10 June 2006, via a partnership between MediaCorp and StarHub, Singapore became the first Southeast Asian country to launch trials of high-definition television. The beginning of the trials coincided with the 2006 FIFA World Cup, with StarHub launching HD service for 1,000 participants. It would carry all matches from the tournament in HD, and then two HD trial channels afterward. On 18 June, MediaCorp launched a part-time terrestrial trial service, which operated in prime time with a mix of original and acquired HD programming and films—some of which simulcast from Channel 5. On 11 November 2007, the trial service was relaunched as HD5, an HD simulcast of Channel 5. Furthermore, MediaCorp also tested interactive television.

In June 2012, after a trial conducted by MediaCorp and StarHub in Ang Mo Kio and Bedok, the Infocomm Media Development Authority (IMDA) officially announced that Singapore would adopt the updated DVB-T2 standards for its deployment of digital terrestrial television, with MediaCorp aiming to make all seven of its free-to-air channels available in DTT by the end of 2013. Association of Southeast Asian Nations (ASEAN) member states agreed to complete their transitions by 2020.

The IMDA instituted a labelling program to promote televisions and converter boxes compatible with digital television, and began the Digital TV Assistance Scheme (DTVAS) in 2014, allowing qualifying low-income households to receive a free converter box. In January 2016, Minister for Communications and Information Yaacob Ibrahim set the end of 2017 as the target for the analogue shutdown, in order to open up the spectrum for mobile broadband and the Smart Nation initiative.

On 6 November 2017, in response to a question posed in Parliament by Melvin Yong, who expressed concerns over the availability of MediaCorp programming, Ibrahim revealed that the analogue shutdown had been delayed by the IMDA to 31 December 2018. According to reports, only around half of Singapore's low-income households had participated in the scheme. Beginning the same day, analogue signals of MediaCorp channels began to display the word "Analogue" next to their logo bugs. On 17 September 2018, the analogue signals also began to display a "squeeze-back" L-bar graphic, displaying reminders and information regarding the transition. MediaCorp talent such as Romeo Tan, Xiang Yun, and He Ying Ying made appearances at public events in partnership with the IMDA to promote the transition.

Analogue television services ended on 2 January 2019, at 00:00.

== Free-to-air terrestrial television channels ==
=== MediaCorp ===
MediaCorp operates six free-to-air terrestrial channels broadcast in the four official languages of the country (English, Mandarin Chinese, Malay, and Tamil). The company holds a monopoly on terrestrial television within the country.

- 5
- 8
- Suria
- Vasantham
- CNA
- U

=== Defunct channels ===
- Sportscity/City TV (closed in 2002)
- Channel i (closed in 2005; the channel allotments were reused by Okto from 2008 to 2019)
- Central (replaced by Vasantham since 2008, Kids Central and Arts Central replaced with Okto)
  - Kids Central
  - Vasantham Central
  - Arts Central
- MediaCorp TVMobile (closed in 2010)
- Okto (Note: replaced Kids Central and Arts Central from Central) (continued as block programming on Channel 5 and 8)

=== Internet TV ===
- meWATCH (launched in 2013 as Toggle)

==== Defunct Internet TV ====
- MOBTV (launched in 2007, ceased services on 7 January 2014)
- Xinmsn (launched in March 2010 in collaboration with Microsoft Singapore, ended services on 1 April 2015)

== Channels from neighboring countries ==
Due to Singapore's proximity to Malaysia and Indonesia, channels from these countries can also be received over-the-air in Singapore. Both countries have also adopted DVB-T2 as their digital television standards.

=== Malaysia ===
All channel signals are based in Johor Bahru and currently provided by MYTV Broadcasting. Signals from TV Malaysia reached Johor Bahru in January 1965, seven months before Singapore left Malaysia. Until the early 2000s, it was common for Singaporean publications to carry schedules for both TV1 and TV2. TV3 did not appear in listings services. Moreover, Singaporean advertisers were hesitant in screening their commercials on the channel and the fact that it carried non-Mandarin Chinese films led to the government discouraging its viewing.

TV1, TV2 and TV3 were carried at the beginning of SCV in 1995, but the latter two had to cut their airtime due to December 1999 copyright rulings effective 9 May 2001 and were subsequently removed on 22 June 2002.

- TV1
- TV2
- TV3
- Hankuk TV
- NTV7
- 8TV
- TV9
- OKEY
- Sukan+
- TV AlHijrah
- Bernama TV
- TVS
- Berita RTM
- SIARA TV

=== Indonesia ===
All channels' signals are based in Batam and Tanjungpinang. Direct reception started on 2 June 1980, (broadcasts went regular on 26 June) when TVRI set up a relay station there. Its proximity with Singapore caused its signal (on Channel 6) to be picked up easily. The transmitter extended its reach in August 1982, enabling the signal to be picked up across all of Singapore and also in Johor Bahru.

- SCTV
- Indosiar
- Moji
- Mentari TV
- Sin Po TV
- RCTI
- MNCTV
- GTV
- iNews
- antv
- tvOne
- Trans TV
- Trans7
- CNN Indonesia
- CNBC Indonesia
- MetroTV
- Kompas TV
- TVRI Nasional
- TVRI Riau Islands
- TVRI World
- TVRI Sport
- TVRI Riau
- Batam TV
- Nusantara TV
- RTV
- MDTV
- TVTPI
- BTV

Viewers farther away from the Malaysian or Indonesian border usually require specialized equipment to receive the signals. Catch-up TV services available on those channels' websites are now accessible in Singapore but only for local programming. Smart TVs are gaining massive popularity among tech-savvy users.

== See also ==
- Mass media in Singapore
- Telecommunications in Singapore
- List of Malay-language television channels
