= Groom My Room =

Singaporean television game show

- Genre: Interior Design
- Presented by: Melody Chen (Season 1-4); Kim Wakerman (Season 5); Lee Ann Chong (Season 6); Evelyn Kuek (Season 7); Joanne Marie Sim (Season 8); Silver Ang (Season 9); Charmian Tan (Season 10-present)
- Narrated by: Melody Chen (Season 1-4); Kim Wakerman (Season 5); Lee Ann Chong (Season 6); Evelyn Kuek (Season 7); Joanne Marie Sim (Season 8); Silver Ang (Season 9)
- Country of origin: Singapore
- Original language: English
- No. of seasons: 11
- No. of episodes: 103

Production
- Production location: Singapore

Original release
- Network: Kids Central (seasons 1-4); Okto (seasons 5-9); Channel 5 (season 10)
- Release: 2005 – October 13, 2020

Related
- Groom My School; The Apartment (TV series)

Groom My Room is a Singaporean home renovation television game show series produced by Mediacorp and aired on Kids Central in the series premiere in 2005, then Okto between seasons five and nine, and Channel 5 beginning season ten. The show focuses on a bedroom renovation for a contestant, aged between 7 and 13, under a given budget and time for a bonus prize.

Since the series premiere in 2005, the series had received critical acclaim and in 2009, a spin-off, Groom My School, was produced and has spun off to different Asian countries.

The series was added to meWatch (previously Toggle) on 15 July 2018. After a near ten-year hiatus, announced on 27 February 2020, the show returned for a tenth season which aired on okto on 5 which premiered on 9 August 2020, thereafter, episodes were then aired on Tuesdays beginning 18 August with encore airing on Sundays, until the season finale aired on 13 October 2020. The eleventh season premiered on Saturdays starting 29 May 2021 with Charmian Tan reprising her hosting role; the encore aired on Wednesdays.

== Gameplay ==
=== House rules ===
In each episode of Groom My Room, a child contestant will renovate his room on his or her liking coupled with a theme to go along. The contestant is given a budget to spend on and an allocated time frame of two days to renovate the room, with the amount varying each season (see table). The contestant is assisted along with an interior designer and a group of room managers (dubbed as "room groomers"), and is given two "lifelines" to use throughout the course of the entire game (a parent and/or a friend of the contestant). Successfully refurnishing the room under the allocated budget, a given time frame and help using no more than two "lifelines" will award the contestant a bonus $100 voucher as a prize (the bonus was not mentioned from Season 10 onwards). Prior to season five, the contestant is given three days to refurnish the room and any time they spent on their shopping are cumulative towards their time frame.

Twists were also used in later seasons though only used on one season only. In the second season (Groom My Room Too), the contestant can also increase their budget through a fundraising event which also cumulates towards their time spent. In season eight, a mystery guest, a celebrity will also join along.

House rules (by season)
Season	Given time frame	Allocated budget
1 - 3	Three days (72 hours)	$500
4	Three days (72 hours)	$1,000
5 - 7	Two days (48 hours)	$1,300
8	Two days (48 hours)	$1,000
9 - 11	Two days (48 hours)	$1,500

== Series overview ==
Season	Episodes	Originally released		
Season	Episodes	First released	Last released	Network
1	13	2005	2005	Kids Central
2	13	2006	2006	Kids Central
3	9	2007	2007	Kids Central
4	8	2008	2008	Kids Central
5	10	2009	2009	okto
6	13	2010	2010	okto
7	14	2011	2011	okto
8	14	2012	2012	okto
9	8	2014	2014	okto
10	10	August 9, 2020	October 13, 2020	Channel 5 (okto on 5)
11	11	May 29, 2021	2021	Channel 5 (okto on 5)
