= MOBTV =

MOBTV Select
- Country: Singapore
- Broadcast area: Nationwide
- Network: MediaCorp TV
- Headquarters: Caldecott Broadcast Centre

Programming
- Picture format: 1080i (HDTV) MPEG-2

Ownership
- Owner: MediaCorp
- Sister channels: MediaCorp Channel 8

History
- Launched: August 2008; 16 years ago
- Closed: 7 January 2014; 11 years ago (MOBTV Select on Singtel Mio TV)

MOBTV (MediaCorp Online Broadband Television) was a Singaporean subscription-based video on demand service. It was launched in August 2008, offering viewers access to a variety of television programmes through digital streaming or downloads via an internet connection.

On 30 March 2010, MOBTV merged with xinmsn.com to become a free video on demand service, incorporating Podcast.sg and xin.sg. MOBTV Select, its version available on Mio TV, was discontinued on 7 January 2014, marking the end of the MOBTV service.

== Services ==
Before the migration, subscribers could access MediaCorp TV programmes, including drama, comedy, and movies. MOBTV was available online at www.mobtv.sg and as MOBTV Select on the SingTel mio TV service within Singapore. Subscribers outside of Singapore could only access content owned by MediaCorp.

The free video-on-demand channels provided streaming services exclusively within Singapore. Users were required to have a valid MOBTV account and a Singapore NRIC to access the content.

=== Packages ===
MOBTV offered two types of subscription packages:

- MediaCorp Channels Package (accessible in Singapore and internationally), which included select content from Channel 5, Channel 8, Channel U, Channel NewsAsia, Suria, okto, and Vasantham. Subscription options were available for either 1 month or 3 months.
- Asian Channels Package (accessible in Singapore), which featured select content from Asian dramas, documentaries, and movies, as well as MediaCorp telemovies. This package also included movies and drama series co-produced by MediaCorp's external partners.

==== Discontinued package ====
In August 2008, MOBTV introduced anime titles under a segment called "AnimeTrix." The service provided anime episodes through Internet-based subscription video on demand (SVOD), allowing users to stream or download episodes within the same week as their broadcast in Japan.
