= Blood Jade =

- Directed by: Ali Fowle
- Narrated by: Andres Williams
- Country of origin: Singapore
- Original language: English

Production
- Producer: Ali Fowle
- Cinematography: Khin Maung Kyaw
- Editor: Jean Kao
- Running time: 45 minutes
- Production company: Mediacorp Pte Ltd

Original release
- Network: Channel NewsAsia
- Release: April 5, 2016

Blood Jade is a 2016 Singaporean documentary television film, directed and produced by Ali Fowle, a broadcast journalist and documentary filmmaker based in Yangon, Myanmar, for Channel NewsAsia. It investigates into the secretive multi-billion jade mining industry in the Kachin State of Myanmar, where it is controlled by the past military elites, its cronies and drug lords, the devastation of the people and its environment, and the often fatal and dangerous working environment around the mines and links to drugs and prostitution.

Aired on Channel NewsAsia's Undercover Asia 3 documentary series on 5 April 2016, it was nominated for Best Current Affairs Programme at the 21st Asian Television Awards in 2016 and was awarded a Finalist Certificate at the 2017 New York Festivals International TV & Film Awards in the Environment and Ecology category.
