= Telok Kurau Secondary School =

Coordinates: 1.31664°N 103.90696°E

Telok Kurau Secondary School 德乐中学 Sekolah Menengah Telok Kurau

Location
- 3 Chin Cheng Avenue, Singapore 429401

Information
- Type: Government
- Motto: Knowledge For Progress
- Established: 1965; 61 years ago
- Closed: 2011; 15 years ago
- Session: Single
- School code: 3305
- Enrolment: 800
- Colour: Red
- Affiliations: Telok Kurau Primary School

Telok Kurau Secondary School (TKSS) was a co-educational secondary school in Bedok, Singapore.

== History ==
The school was established in 1965 to cater to the education needs of the malay population in the area.

== Closure ==
In 2011, Telok Kurau Secondary School was closed down and all students were transferred to Broadrick Secondary School.

== Academic Programme ==
The school offered a four-year express programme leading to GCE 'O' Level, and an academic programme for the students who follow the Normal Academic and Normal Technical path. All Express students in Telok Kurau were offered pure physics, chemistry, and biology besides additional mathematics.

== Campus ==
The school campus stood on Chin Cheng Avenue along Still Road, not far away from Eunos MRT station.

== Notable alumni ==
- Hawazi Daipi: Former Member of Parliament
- Muhamad Faisal Manap: Member of Parliament of Aljunied GRC
- Woon Tai Ho: Founder of Channel NewsAsia
- Marvin Lim Chun Kiat: Singaporean snooker player
