= Sandra Buenaventura =

Singaporean broadcasting executive

Sandra P. M. Buenaventura (7 December 1950) is a Singaporean broadcasting executive. Initially, she worked at the Ministry of Culture, having been transferred to RTS (now Mediacorp) in 1979 upon its corporatisation to SBC. There, she was head of Programme Acquisitions and censor, as well as promotor of Channel 12, and CEO of the later reformed Singapore Television Twelve.

== Early life and education ==
Buenaventura graduated from the University of Singapore in 1974 with a bachelor's degree in Social Science. From 1975 to 1977, she acted as an administrative officer in the Ministry of Defence, and, in 1978, research officer in the Ministry of Culture.

== Broadcasting career ==
In 1979, she was promoted to work at Radio Television Singapore—at the time in its corporatisation process to become the Singapore Broadcasting Corporation—as head of programme acquisition and scheduling. In addition to that, she also acted as SBC's chief censor, primarily dealing with imports that made it to Channel 5. These guidelines were published in a confidential document. On top of that, her work involved annual meetings with the Board of Film Censors. The staff grew with the launch of Channel 12 in 1984. In 1982, in an interview given to The Straits Times, she stressed that the ban of the first episode of Journey Into The Himalayas on the Ganges River as being a "guide series", in this case, on Hinduism, and that content that was "religiously inclined" was not allowed.

Her tenure at SBC led to the acquisition of fine arts-related programming, in order to promote cultural programmes and appreciation of fine arts among Singaporeans. The first deal was a 108-hour contract with Rainier Morris, which SBC wanted to show for a long time, and that, if those 108 hours ran out, it would contact the company to supply more content. In late 1982, she received a telex from Asia Television to provide SBC programmes into Hong Kong.

Buenaventura attended yearly content sales events in Cannes (MIPCOM) and the United States; in 1983, she said to The Straits Times that the main problem was the language barrier, as she preferred to buy programmes in English, however more European titles began to trickle in, as long as they were dubbed or subtitled into English from the producer and/or distributor. In December, SBC announced the creation of a third channel, SBC 12, and her job at SBC was extended to cover the new service. The channel—which opened on 31 January 1984—was not driven by language, but rather the quality of its programmes. In August 1989, she gave the greenlight for SBC to air the Hungarian film Mephisto as television technology in use at the time enabled cuts to be done directly on tape. Said film was withdrawn from the Singapore International Film Festival in January of that year due to censorship problems.

With the privatisation of SBC in 1994, Buenaventura was appointed CEO of Television Twelve (later Singapore Television Twelve), thus becoming the only woman among the five CEO posts in the new Singapore International Media group. She also oversaw the launch of Premiere 12 and touted the complementary nature of the two channels. She left her post in April 1997, choosing to join the Ministry of Defence. She was replaced by Lim Hup Seng.

== Ministry of Defence ==
At Mindef, she was the co-chairman of publicity and general manager of Safra Radio. The move to radio was to foster competition in the radio industry, which was limited in Singapore.
