= Jo Kilat =

1998 Singaporean animated series

- Also known as: Lightning Jo
- Genre: Comedy; Satire
- Country of origin: Singapore
- Original language: Malay
- No. of seasons: 1
- No. of episodes: 13

Production
- Running time: 22 minutes
- Production company: UTV International

Original release
- Network: Prime 12
- Release: 30 January 1998 – December 1998

Jo Kilat (Lightning Jo in English) was a Singaporean animated series produced by UTV International for Singapore Television Twelve. The series aired on Prime 12 in 1998 and was the first such local animation. The series was about a group of multi-ethnic kids, representing the ethnic diversity of Singapore. The series consisted of thirteen episodes, starting with a one-off Ramadan special followed by a regular 12-episode season.

== Premise ==
The series is about Jo, a 10-year old street-wise Singaporean Malay who is "as fast as lightning", which gave him the nickname Jo Kilat. His closest friends are of other key ethnic groups of Singapore: Sam, an Indian who is a heavy eater, Nick, a tall Chinese Singaporean and Rid, who represented the Singaporean teens of the time, who preferred to listen to music on his Walkman instead of worrying about the state of the Singaporean dollar. Older characters include Jo's parents and his grandfather Tok.

== Production ==
Canadian-Indian company UTV International set up an office in Singapore in 1995 with the aim of producing offshore animation, marketing local characters and situations at an international scale. A pilot episode aired on Prime 12 on 30 January 1998 as a Ramadan special. In this episode, Jo and his friends search for a lost companion in Geylang Serai during Ramadan. The aim of the series was to showcase the popularity of local animation and storylines in a country keen on appreciating Western animated series such as The Simpsons. Producer Marhaini Kamarudin was confident that the characters in the series were set to become a hit among children and adults. Animation was done by a Mumbai team led by Indian animation expert Rem Mohan. Most of the animators at the time of production had never been to Singapore before. The pilot was repeated on 8 February. One such detail was that the policeman wore a white uniform, which in Singapore was blue.

In February, it was announced that the series would start in April, while UTV pitched international sales for Malaysia and Indonesia, trying to attract the wider Malay population in the archipelago, estimated at the time of being 200 million. The Hari Raya special received praise from the SBA Programme Advisory Committee at the end of February, for its portrayal of life in Singapore.

The full series eventually premiered in September 1998. The first episode was broadcast on 20 September.

The series won an award in December 1998, becoming the most popular Malay-language kids show of 1998, surpassing two educational series on Prime 12, Matemajik and Ya Alif.

Following the retooling of Singapore Television Twelve's channels and the creation of the current Suria, the new channel aired reruns from 31 January 2000 to 15 April 2000.
