= Mediacorp TV12 =

Subsidiary of Mediacorp

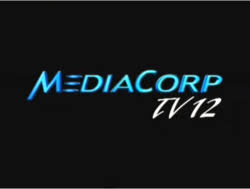
The Mediacorp TV12 logo.

Mediacorp TV12 (formerly Singapore Television Twelve, Malay: Televisyen Duabelas Singapura, Tamil: சிங்கப்பூர் தொலைக்காட்சி பன்னிரண்டு, Ciṅkappūr Tolaikkāṭci Paṉṉiraṇṭu) is a subsidiary of Mediacorp. It operates the Suria and Vasantham channels, which cater to specific groups in Singapore, as well as Central and Okto. TV12 also owns production units: Mediacorp EagleVision, which is used for television production, and Mediacorp VizPro Entertainment for live events.

== History ==
=== Background ===
TV12 originally started as SBC Channel 12, which started broadcasting on 31 January 1984, under the control of Sandra Buenaventura. The channel had a niche, highbrow appeal, but it toned down the amount of programming to increase its appeal among locals who thought the content was "too European". The channel reduced the amount of operas and added mini-series and documentaries to its weekly schedule in March 1985. In 1986, it added wrestling shows as well.

This format remained the norm for Channel 12 until 1 January 1994 when all Malay programmes from Channel 5 were moved to Channel 12. On 29 January, Channel 12 rebranded.

=== Television Twelve ===
At the same time, the Singapore Broadcasting Corporation was being privatised and divided into three units owned by Singapore International Media: the Television Corporation of Singapore, in charge of channels 5 and 8; the Radio Corporation of Singapore, in charge of the radio stations; and Television Twelve, in charge of Channel 12. The new corporations came into effect on 1 October 1994. Television Twelve was positioned as a public service broadcasting company and, as such, would host a fourth television channel: an Ultra High Frequency (UHF) outlet dedicated exclusively to cultural programming. Under these plans, all Tamil programming would move from Channel 8 to Channel 12, with the existing channel becoming an ethnic channel, while the former Channel 12 fare would move to the new UHF channel. Another TV12 priority was the production of "high-quality public service programmes".

In order to fulfill its public service credentials, in May 1995, TV12 announced plans to find independent production houses to produce programmes for its channels. At the time, independent production companies had little know-how. However, according to the then Head of Programme, Sandra Buenaventura, this would lead to increased competition between the companies even while aiming at improving the quality of the programmes. TV12 also planned to produce programmes on its own. On 29 July 1995, it formally announced the creation of a second channel on UHF channel 24.

=== Singapore Television Twelve ===
Ahead of the launch of the UHF channel, the company was renamed as Singapore Television Twelve (STV12) and left the Caldecott Hill facilities. It moved to its own place at the Bestway Building in Shenton Way. Its own facility had a reception area, which The Straits Times found to be "futuristic-looking", with couches in primary colours, while its reception counter featured STV12 merchandise for sale.

The new line-up premiered on 1 September 1995 , consisting of Prime 12 on the existing VHF channel, and Premiere 12 on UHF channel 24, inheriting the former Channel 12 format. It wanted to become the world's first profitable public service broadcasting company, as both of its channels carried commercial advertising, which PBS and the BBC don't do.

By 1996, Malay-language programming acquired from local companies had become profitable, including a documentary series, Meniti Pelangi (Follow the Rainbow), which was produced by Fandi Ahmad's production company Fandi Ahmad International. It was also going to take part in the inaugural Asian Television Awards as a co-host, but pulled out at the last minute on the early hours of 15 November 1996 due to "unresolved issues" concerning budget. Another issue was that its sports unit was created in the middle of the year, which did not qualify for the awards, as the period was only valid between July 1995 and June 1996. Premiere 12 was to screen it on 30 November; Channel 5 would repeat it on 1 December. STV12 was going to be the only outlet, but without the production facilities and the cost of hiring commercial producers, Television Asia, creator of the awards, talked to TCS instead. STV12 refused to comment.

In January 1997, STV12 announced a partnership with the Economic Development Board to upgrade independent production companies producing programmes for its channels, under the Local Industry Upgrading Programme (Liup) scheme. At the end of the month, Sandra Buenaventura quit her post at STV12, but was signed again effective 5 February, when she was expected to return to Singapore.

STV12 announced in 1998 that it would develop an Enhanced TV service with digital content developer Media Manager. Its two channels would use their vertical blanking interval to provide value-added data to viewers. The Singapore One network held a six-month trial run of the service. In November, when it made its fourth anniversary carnival, it announced plans to rename the two channels, under the grounds that "Prime" and "Premiere" sounded similar, in both meaning and spelling. The rename process would take "another two years or so".

STV12 was appointed as the PSB SBU of the new MediaCorp conglomerate on 1 August 1999. In September 1999, Woon Tai Ho took over from Lim Hup Seng as Director-General of STV12, and announced to the public that its two channels, Prime 12 and Premiere 12, would be replaced effective 30 January 2000. The former was to be renamed Suria, an all-Malay channel, while the Tamil programming would move to Premiere 12, which was set to become Central. The new service was to be divided into three programming belts: Kids Central for children, Vasantham Central for Tamil programming and Arts Central for highbrow programming. Certain types of programmes were purged, such as US news magazines (to Channel NewsAsia), David Letterman (to Channel 5) and sports programming (to SportsCity, which was set to launch on 30 January alongside the revised STV12 offer). By changing the names, it became easier to differentiate the formats and programmes of the channels.

Throughout its existence under this name, STV12 was frequently mistaken for the Television Corporation of Singapore. The confusion stemmed from the SBC days, when all channels were under the same owner.

=== Mediacorp TV12 ===
In January 2006, it signed a deal with US Asian cable network, ImaginAsian TV, to provide the channel with 100 hours of Arts Central content. Such content included Party Guide for an Urbanite and Stage to Screen.

== List of channels ==
=== Television ===
- Suria is a Malay free-to-air terrestrial television channel in Singapore. It is the largest Malay channel in Singapore.
- Vasantham is a Tamil free-to-air terrestrial television channel dedicated to the Indian community, launched on 19 October 2008. It replaced the Vasantham Central timebelt.

=== Former television channels ===
- Kids Central was the first timeshare on the Central and broadcasts children's programmes. It was replaced by Okto on 19 October 2008.
- Vasantham Central was the second timeshare on the Central channel. It is also hailed as the biggest Indian television station outside of India. It offers Tamil movies for Singaporean Tamil. It was replaced by the standalone Vasantham channel on 19 October 2008.
- Arts Central was the third timeshared channel on Central. Arts Central generally shows alternative programs from around the globe. It was replaced by Okto on 19 October 2008. It was later revived as a~ok (arts on Okto). However, as the channel rebranded to include sporting programmes by mid-2017, it was moved to Channel 5 as arts on 5.
- Okto was an English free-to-air terrestrial television channel with selected programmes broadcast in the language of the country of origin launched on 19 October 2008. An example was Filmart which showcases critically acclaimed films from around the world in its original language. Okto retained the programming of both Kids Central and Arts Central - former timeshares of the Central channel. Meanwhile, it replaced SPH Mediaworks Channel i, a subsidiary of SPH MediaWorks, on its frequency. The kids segment was moved to Channel 5, while the Sports segment moved to Mediacorp's digital streaming service, Toggle. Okto closed down on 1 May 2019 due to low viewership.

== Production ==
- EagleVision is a content producer for Suria and Vasantham. It co-produces programmes with various foreign broadcasters and production houses.
- VizPro Entertainment is the company's events arm. It has brought in and produced several international and local acts such as Disney on Ice, Barney & Friends, Winnie the Pooh, Wedding Banquet and Siti Nurhaliza Concert.

== See also ==
- Singapore Press Holdings
