= NewsVision =

Defunct Singaporean news channel

NewsVision was the first Singaporean subscription television channel. Owned by Singapore Cable Vision, the channel aired a mix of live and pre-recorded news bulletins from various sources, as well as a repeat of the news from Channel 5. It was eventually replaced by CNN International.

== History ==
NewsVision, the first of the three SCV channels, launched on 2 April 1992. Initially the channel's schedule consisted of rebroadcasts of CNN International, in a bid it won in December 1991 over BBC World Service Television, due to the technical limitations of the initial service. NewsVision carried eight minutes of advertising per hour, being shared between local ad slots and those from the relays of CNN International.

NewsVision's CNN coverage was supplemented by the ITN World News and simulcasts of the 9pm SBC News bulletin. By July 1993, NewsVision had added content from the NHK, the news bulletin of the recently launched Australia Television International and its newest addition, a half-hour BBC World Service Television bulletin from Monday to Saturday.

SBC 5 aired a commercial for NewsVision on 5 October 1993 during the news, where a boxing glove repeatedly punched a television screen to reveal the names of the partners (CNNI, ITN, BBC, NHK, ATVI). The commercial announced that Singaporeans now had access to 24-hour news coverage, which SBC saw as a challenge to its operation. By January 1995, it had added programmes from Asia Business News.

It is unknown when exactly did NewsVision shut down; the launch of SCV's full cable service in June 1995 provided 24-hour access to its partner channels (ABN, NHK, BBC World, CNN International).
