= Eureka Learning Channel =

Singaporean educational television channel

Eureka Learning Channel, also known as Eureka, was a Singaporean cable television channel owned by and broadcast on Singapore Cable Vision (SCV). Portions of the schedule were also carried for free on the SCV Preview Channel.

Eureka was Singapore's first home-grown children's channel with a strong emphasis on educational content, the vast majority of which came from overseas. The channel operated between September 2, 1996 and March 31, 2002. By 1999, Eureka was available in 20% of Singaporean households.

== History ==
Eureka was launched by Aline Wong, and its local programmes were made in collaboration with the Curriculum Development Institute of Singapore, the Ministry of Health, and Singapore's two universities. Ahead of Eureka's launch, a programme produced by the National University of Singapore titled Preparing for Higher Education was broadcast on the SCV cable network. It was one of 12 local programmes to be shown on Eureka upon its launch on 2 September 1996. The target audience ranged from pre-schoolers as little as 3 to young adults in their early twenties.

Upon launching on the scheduled date, Eureka was broadcast 15 hours a day from 7:00 am to 10:00 pm. The bulk of programming was intended for kids and young adults, while from 9:00 pm to 10:00 pm, the channel had an hour devoted to adult education. Children's programming was divided between four key demographics: pre-schoolers (ages 3–6), pupils (ages 6–12), teens (ages 12–17), and young adults (ages 17–22). Pre-school programming was about language and numbers, while young adult programming tackled subjects like sports, music, careers, and social issues; adult education programming tackled leadership and accounting in an initial phase. Eureka also showed documentaries provided by embassies, specifically for its adult education or children's education slots.

In its early years, Eureka was carried on channel 6. The channel also had plans to expand beyond Singapore and the region. It ceased operations on April 1, 2002.

== Programming ==
=== Local ===
- Preparing for Higher Education
- Health Beat
- Kampung TV Tampines
- Spilled Milk

=== Foreign ===
- Polka Dot Door
- Teletubbies
- Barney & Friends
- Katie and Orbie
- Animal Tales
- Here's Humphrey
- Tombik and B.B.
- Mad Scientist Toon Club
- The Why Why Family
- Inspector Gadget's Field Trip
- PC4U
- Banana Zoo
- Where on Earth Is Carmen Sandiego?
- The Magic School Bus
- The Magic Box
- Nature Connection
- Ready or Not
- Ghostwriter
- The Big Comfy Couch
- Brambly Hedge
- Shakespeare: The Animated Tales
- The Enid Blyton Secret Series
- Amazing Animals
- The Huggabug Club
- Hot Science
- Percy the Park Keeper
- Pappyland
- Julia Child & Company
- Old MacDonald's Sing-A-Long Farm
- The World of Peter Rabbit and Friends
- Adventures with Kanga Roddy
- Groundling Marsh
- The Eddie Files
- Animal Ark
- Dotto's Data Cafe
- By the Numbers
- Mastering the Internet
- Earth Revisited
- Marketing for the 90's
- Energy Express (health)
- The Sales Connection
- Undercurrents
- Literary Vision
- The Travel Magazine
- The Web
- CNN Newsroom
- Newswriting
- Time to Grow
- Bloomberg TV simulcasts
