= Against Us =

2008 book by Jim Sciutto

Against Us: The New Face of America's Enemies in the Muslim World
- Author: Jim Sciutto
- Language: English
- Publisher: Harmony Books
- Publication date: September 9, 2008
- Pages: 288
- ISBN: 9780307406880

Against Us: The New Face of America's Enemies in the Muslim World is a 2008 book by Jim Sciutto, published by Harmony Books. Sciutto argued that Anti-American sentiment in the Middle East and Islamic world was on the increase due to actions done by the U.S. government. Publishers Weekly stated that this sentiment was "becoming in effect, a form of Middle Eastern nationalism." According to book the anti-American sentiment spread to religiously moderate and pro-democracy activists.

== Background ==
Sciutto at the time worked for ABC News as a journalist covering news outside of the United States. After the September 11, 2001 attacks occurred, his assignments included the Middle East for the first time. As part of his research, Sciutto used polling data and conducted interviews in the Middle East and the United Kingdom. Interview subjects included a female student from Afghanistan, the wife of an Egyptian political prisoner, an Iranian secretly operating a blog, a trauma surgeon in Baghdad, Iraq, a member of Al Qaeda incarcerated in Jordan, a Christian man in Lebanon who supports Hezbollah, and a former jihadist from Saudi Arabia.

== Contents ==
The book discusses the history of the Middle East, and chronicles nine countries. The book criticizes the George W. Bush administration. Sciutto made his recommendations for changes in American and Western foreign policy at the end of the book. His suggestions were stated by Spectrum that the governments ought to "forswear the us-versus-them mentality and instead to embrace global strategies that strengthen ties with the Middle East"; he argued that there should be apologies for past misbehavior from the U.S. government.

== Reception ==
Bryce Christiansen of Booklist stated that Against Us is "Much-needed light on dark geopolitical realities."

Publishers Weekly stated that Against Us "is less interesting for what it reveals about American policy than for its empathetic and candid depiction of its subjects and their lives."

Kirkus Reviews stated that while it had "Well-cast thumbnail sketches" of its interview subjects, Against Us lacked "Fresh insights and forward-looking prescriptions", and concluded that it was "A missed opportunity."

Debra McGuire of the Las Vegas Review-Journal argued that "Sciutto could have done a great service in his book if he had resisted the popular temptation to blame us. [meaning the United States government/United States] That’s easy. The truth is harder."
