= Jim Sciutto =

American journalist (born 1970)

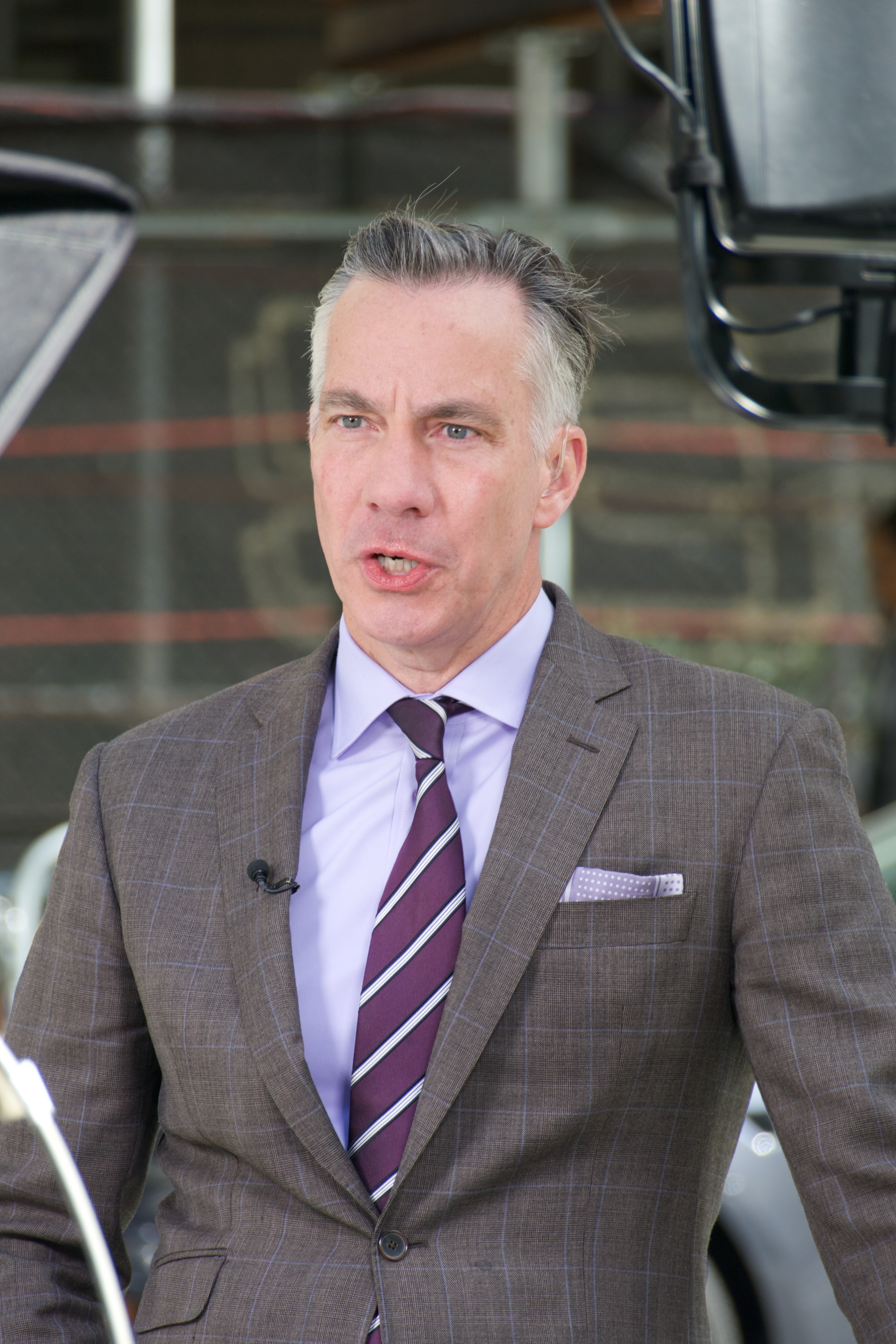
- Jim Sciutto in 2024
- Born: James Ernest Sciutto; March 10, 1970 (age 56)
- Education: Yale University
- Spouse: Gloria Riviera (m. 2006)
- Children: 3

James Ernest Sciutto (born March 10, 1970) is an American news anchor and former government official who has been the chief national security correspondent for CNN since September 2013. In this role he provides analysis on a variety of topics concerning United States national security, including foreign policy, the military, terrorism, and the intelligence community. From 2011 to 2013, he served as chief of staff to U.S. Ambassador Gary Locke at the U.S. Embassy in Beijing. Prior to his appointment as chief of staff, he was senior foreign correspondent for ABC News, based in London. He is the author of Against Us: The New Face of America's Enemies in the Muslim World among other books. He anchors CNN Newsroom with Jim Sciutto weekdays from 3-4pm ET on CNN Max.

== Biography ==
Sciutto attended St. Ignatius Loyola School before Regis High School in Manhattan. He is of Italian and Irish descent; his father was Ernest Sciutto and his mother was Liz Sciutto (née Higgins). Sciutto is a 1992 graduate of Yale College where he majored in Chinese history and graduated cum laude. During his time at Yale, Sciutto lived at Pierson College.

Following in the footsteps of his mother, who worked as a film editor at WHAS-TV in Louisville, Kentucky, Sciutto began his career in television as the moderator and the producer of the PBS program The Student Press, a weekly public affairs talk show aimed at college students. Sciutto was the Hong Kong correspondent for Asia Business News, and covered the return of Hong Kong to China in 1997. Sciutto also covered stories in China, Mongolia, Laos, Vietnam, Singapore, and South Korea. He joined ABC News in 1998, working in Chicago before moving to Washington, D.C. to cover the Pentagon.

Sciutto was an appointee of the Obama administration, serving as chief of staff and senior advisor to the U.S. Ambassador to China, Gary Locke.

In 2006, he married ABC News Correspondent Gloria Riviera in a Roman Catholic ceremony in Manhattan.

== Works ==
- Sciutto, Jim (September 9, 2008). Against Us: The New Face of America's Enemies in the Muslim World. Random House. ISBN 978-0307406897.
- Sciutto, Jim (May 14, 2019). The Shadow War: Inside Russia's and China's Secret Operations to Defeat America. Harper. ISBN 978-0062853646.
- Sciutto, Jim (August 11, 2020). The Madman Theory: Trump Takes On the World. Harper. ISBN 9780063005686.
- Sciutto, Jim (March 12, 2024). The Return of Great Powers: Russia, China, and the Next World War (Hardcover ed.). Penguin Random House. ISBN 9780593474136.

== Honors ==
- Edward R. Murrow Award for his reporting from Iran during the 2009 election protests.
- George Polk Award for Television Reporting in 2007 for his undercover reporting inside Myanmar.
- Emmy awards in 2004 and 2005 for best story in a regularly scheduled newscast for his reporting in Iraq. Emmy nominations in 2008 for his reporting inside Myanmar and in 2005 for his reporting in Beslan, Russia during the school siege.
- Fulbright Fellow in Hong Kong from 1993 to 1994.
- Associate Fellow of Pierson College at Yale.
- Selected as a life member of the Council on Foreign Relations in 2008.

== See also ==
- New Yorkers in journalism
- Madman Theory
