= TVRI Riau Islands =

TVRI Kepulauan Riau
- Tanjungpinang; Indonesia
- Channels: Virtual: 2

Programming
- Language: Indonesian

Ownership
- Owner: TVRI

History
- First air date: 9 November 2021

Technical information
- Licensing authority: Ministry of Communication and Digital Affairs

TVRI Kepulauan Riau (TVRI Riau Islands, legally LPP TVRI Stasiun Kepulauan Riau, also known as TVRI Kepri) is a regional television station. It is owned by Televisi Republik Indonesia, which covers Batam, Tanjung Pinang and adjacent areas. Its programming includes local newscast Kepri Hari Ini and local talk shows, as well as relaying TVRI's national schedule.

Its studio and transmitting station are located in Tanjungpinang, Riau Islands.

== History ==
=== TVRI carriage in the Riau Islands before 2021 ===
On 2 June 1980, TVRI began testing transmissions from Batam, a city adjacent to the provincial capital Tanjungpinang, on VHF channel 6. Its location made it possible to reach Singapore, the fifth receivable channel. It was a relay station without local programming catering to Batam. Its regular broadcasts started on 26 June, three weeks after tests began. Juma'at bin Sujak, an assistant technician at Telecoms, was mocked because of the reception of the Batam relay station after discovering its existence at his home, because his colleagues thought that Indonesia was far away. The transmitter extended its reach in August 1982, enabling the signal to be picked up across Singapore.

=== Local programming ===
On 9 November 2021, local programming originating from Tanjungpinang began with the inauguration of the facilities, which included a small studio for local production. At the time, TVRI had pledged its commitment to broadcast to remote areas of Indonesia, as well as improving the quality of local output. With its opening, all Indonesian provinces could watch a TVRI local station. On 27 May 2022, groundbreaking work for a full local building began. In December 2024, three people working for the construction of the building were arrested for corruption, costing the state IDR 9,3 billion.
