= Woon Tai Ho =

Singaporean writer, art collector and TV producer

- Born: 26 July 1958 (age 68); Singapore
- Education: National University of Singapore
- Organization(s): Channel NewsAsia, MediaCorp, National Gallery Singapore

Woon Tai Ho (Chinese: 云大篪; pinyin: Yun Dachi) (born 26 July 1958), is a TV producer, art collector and writer. He is the founder of Channel NewsAsia.

== Early life ==
Woon grew up in Geylang, where he would organise 20-cent magic lantern shows for the neighbourhood with his twin brother, former MediaCorp Raintree Pictures CEO and Homerun Asia founder Daniel Yun.

His father, a chef, died when he was in secondary school, and his mother tried various ways to care for her two sons and two daughters, including running a food stall.

Woon attended Telok Kurau Secondary School and Hwa Chong Junior College on scholarships, and graduated from the National University of Singapore with a Bachelor of Arts (Honours) in Political Science in 1982.

In his youth, Woon was an aspiring painter who sold a work when he was 16 years old.

== Career ==
Woon began his career as a producer in Singapore Broadcasting Corporation and Television Corporation of Singapore, producing programmes like Depth of Field: A Portrait of Chua Soo Bin (1989), A Changing Beat (1990) and War in the Gulf (1991).

In 1999, he launched Channel NewsAsia. From 2000 to 2004, which Woon describes as "the most rewarding years of my life", he was the CEO of MediaCorp TV12, and from 2004 to 2009, the managing director of MediaCorp News.

In November 2008, Woon released a non-fiction book on the life and work of Cultural Medallion recipient Tan Swie Hian, To Paint a Smile.

In 2009, he left MediaCorp and in June of the same year, founded media consultancy Green Orange.

In February 2013, Woon released his debut novel Riot Green, set in the cut-throat world of South-east Asian art. Riot Green is in the process of being adapted into a movie.

In August 2013, Woon was appointed as Director for Media and Marketing for the National Gallery Singapore. In January 2015, Woon, in a shock move, quit. Woon is currently a senior media consultant at communications consultancy RHT ARC Comms & Relations.

Woon has also contributed articles on art and travel to The Business Times and The Straits Times, and helped put together an exhibition of early Keith Haring drawings in 2012.

In 2024, he won the inaugural Dr Alan H.J. Chan Spirit of Singapore Book Prize for his biography of artist Lim Tze Peng, Soul Of Ink: Lim Tze Peng At 100 (2021).

== Personal life ==
He is an art collector, counting the works of Roland Ventura and Tan Swie Hian as part of his collection.

== Works by Woon ==
- Art of joy: The journey of Yip Yew Chong (World Scientific, 2024) ISBN 9811278717
- Unfinished canvas: Life of Koh Seow Chuan (World Scientific, 2024) ISBN 9811287317
- Rainbow after Dusk: Lim Tze Peng Remembers (World Scientific, 2023) ISBN 9811274541
- George Yeo: Musings. Series one to three (World Scientific, 2022-23) ISBN 9811259690 ISBN 9811259720 ISBN 9811259755
- Transition: The story of PN Balji (Marshall Cavendish International, 2022) ISBN 9815066803
- Soul of ink: Lim Tze Peng at 100 (World Scientific, 2021) ISBN 9811237026
- We Have A Problem: Crisis and Reputation Management in the Digital Age (Candid Creation, 2016) ISBN 981098443X
- Riot Green (Candid Creation, 2013) ISBN 9810752512
- My kampong, my home: Conversations with Lim Tze Peng (2010) ISBN 9810873654
- Partnering to rebuild: Operation Blue Orchid: the Singapore Armed Forces experience in Iraq (Ministry of Defence, Public Affairs Dept, 2010) ISBN 9810848536
- To paint a smile: Insights of one artist's approach to happiness (Candid Creation, 2010) ISBN 9810818076
