= StarHub TV =

Cable television operator in Singapore

Star Hub TV
- Type: IPTV
- Country: Singapore
- First air date: 11 July 1991; 35 years ago
- Broadcast area: Singapore
- Owner: StarHub
- Key people: Tan Tong Hai (CEO)
- Former names: Singapore Cable Vision (1991 – 2002)
- Official website: www.starhub.com

StarHub TV is a pay television service provided by StarHub in Singapore. It has been a subsidiary of StarHub Limited since StarHub acquired Singapore Cable Vision (SCV) in 2001, and was the sole pay-TV operator in the country until 2007 when mio TV (now Singtel TV), an IPTV service from its competitor, Singtel, was launched.

The company offers IPTV services via the optical fibre network. It also provides this service via a wireless network, the Digital Terrestrial Television system.

== Company history ==
=== Prior attempts at starting cable television in Singapore ===
The history of cable TV in Singapore began on 25 January 1978, when a spokesman of the Ministry of Culture announced that two companies were bidding for a license to provide cable services for 30 hotels. The two companies interested were Rediffusion Singapore and Australian company Stratton Enterprises. Commercial advertising was forbidden from the services to be provided, and that operators would have to buy their programmes for screening. The area with the most requests for a cable service was Orchard Road. The cable network was to be built by Telecoms using its existing coaxial cable network. For this end, Telecoms would invest S$1 billion over a period of five years; the roadmap included the installation of the skeleton cable network in 1980/81. In order for the network to be built, Telecoms started conducting studies in countries where cable television was more advanced.

In December 1978, hotels weren't convinced of the idea of a cable television network for their guests, with some hotels being unaware of how such a system worked, as well as general disinterest and high installation costs. Telecoms at the same time announced a survey whose results would lead to the introduction of a cable television service.

In April 1979, Telecoms announced the implementation of its cable network in Orchard Road by 1981, and among the services offered was cable television. The cable network would generate its signals from Telecoms' Comcentre at Exeter Road to cover all hotels in the area, private housing estates and some adjacent estates from the Housing Development Board. The area was selected due to the cost of the cables, meaning that they were installed close to Comcentre, and its capability of having a high potential zone with interested customers in the hotel and household sectors. It would provide both of RTS's channels as well as subscription movie offerings and programmes catering tourists and the industry. There was a plan to provide two or three channels, with one for hotels and another for educational purposes. Results of the preliminary study in August have shown that viewers had interest in the upcoming cable service, which implied that Telecoms had plans to introduce its cable service by 1981 or 1982, granted that subscribers would wire if the fees were "reasonable". Cable television would also have laxer levels of censorship than RTS, as well as programmes that RTS wasn't interested in showing. RTS was unlikely to produce programmes for the cable network. Commercial advertising was limited to between programmes, which caused a problem to the viability of such a service, as subscriptions would be higher than S$20. All of the three private bids for cable television by then were rejected by the government. Telecoms later announced that it would delay the project due to lack of viability.

=== Singapore Cable Vision's early years ===
In 1991, the Singapore Broadcasting Corporation was interested in setting up a cable network. In January 1991, a US company (Continental Cablevision) studied the feasibility of a cable service in Singapore, showing its interest over the high density of television set ownership (1 set in every 600,000 households). Another company, a subsidiary of the Oversea Chinese Banking Corporation, set up a preliminary survey to study the potential cable market in the country, and in the region by May. After the study, which was set to last a year, the government would greenlight the license. On 11 July 1991, the then Singapore Cable Vision (SCV) was licensed to establish a nationwide broadband cable network to provide pay-TV services. SCV also had the unprecedented responsibility of delivering terrestrial free-to-air (FTA) channels to Singapore households via its cable points, free-of-charge to viewers. In October, with the Asian launch of BBC World Service Television, coinciding with Princess Anne's visit to Singapore, SBC was still in the negotiating phase to carry its contents over the planned news channel. A third channel, a variety channel in the Mandarin language, was announced in late January, favoured over a proposed English-language variety channel after conducting research. For the feasibility of a cable network, a Hong Kong consultant was appointed, ahead of the launch of the UHF service.

The first of the three channels, NewsVision, came on air on 2 April 1992. Two further channels, VarietyVision and MovieVision, were to be launched on June 1. In December 1991, NewsVision won the rights to carry CNN International programming over BBC World Service Television's output. SBC and SCV were willing to find foreign partners.

Initially, services were delivered over scrambled UHF signals, with the package of three channels being priced in at up to $50, depending on the number of channels the subscriber wanted, with prices comparable to those offered by Sky in New Zealand and Thai Sky TV in Thailand, both of which also offered three channels.

In the setup of the network of channels, SCV announced that the new channels would carry commercials. VarietyVision was set to carry four minutes of advertising per hour, NewsVision, eight minutes per hour and MovieVision was exempt. Ad rates were lower than the ones carried out by SBC's channels and half of the advertising time on NewsVision was shared between local ad slots and those from the relays of CNN International. A $2 million contract with McCann Erickson for advertising was signed. SCV set up an initial target of 30,000 subscribers.

Within its first week, SCV claimed to have had an "overwhelming response", according to a print ad from its technological suppliers, Jerrold and General Instrument. By month's end, 90% of Singaporean hotel guests now had interest in the service.

SCV launched MovieVision and VarietyVision on 13 May 1992 (ahead of the initial 1 June target), this time with the goal of achieving 4,500 subscribers (three times the number of subscribers SCV had in May) by the end of June. MovieVision initially broadcast 12 hours a day, offering 30 movies per month, with the aim of increasing its daily schedule to 18 hours a day in January 1993. VarietyVision, broadcasting entirely in Chinese, carried programming from the Chinese world (the mainland, Taiwan and Hong Kong) 18 hours a day Sundays to Fridays and 24 hours a day on Saturdays.

Goldtron announced in June 1992 that it won a five-year technological contract for SCV. Its subsidiary Dynamar would supply the TOCOM decoders for its subscribers.

MovieVision, the HBO relayer, started 24-hour broadcasts in April 1994.

=== Preparing a cable network ===
In December 1993, Information and the Arts Minister Brigadier-General George Yeo announced that Singapore would expect "a dozen" cable channels by 1995, followed by "20 to 30" channels by 1998. By the end of the second phase, all HDB households would be connected to the service. Channels for the Japanese, German and French communities were also on the cards. SCV would remain a monopoly in the subscription television sector, with a push for competition after a few years, and would use Singapore Telecom's cable network to deliver its content. After a tour of major US media conglomerates in April and May 1994, Yeo announced that the cable network would be running "in two years". As of June, the UHF service was receivable in almost 4% of Singaporean households and 85% of hotel rooms. 20% of home subscribers had a subscription to two of the three channels and 60% subscribed to all three. The reach in households made it accessible to over 110,000 viewers. The total cost of the project was $500 million. The shareholder structure was changed in readiness for the new network, with Singapore International Media holding 31%, Continental Cablevision 25%, Singapore Technologies 24% and SPH 20%. SBC dropped out of SCV because its successors were going to be SIM subsidiaries. The NTUC would also act as a channel provider.

SCV announced in September 1994 that it would begin transmitting the three Malaysian terrestrial networks – TV1, TV2 and TV3 - as part of its network in 1995, ending Singapore's arms-length stance for the latter since its launch. There were also plans for a "City TV" community channel and interactive services at the long-term. All of its offerings, including the three Malaysian channels, were subject to negotiations and terms of acceptance by the Singapore Broadcasting Authority.

Construction work for the cable network started in October 1994 in Tampines and hoped to offer a video-on-demand service "at some time in the future", a pay-per-view service "within three years", as well as other interactive services such as shopping from home and house calls from repairmen.

Phase one of the installation of the cable network in Tampines was scheduled to finish in June 1995, it would take three-and-a-half to four years for the entire island to be connected. Tampines was selected due to "technical and commercial considerations". The phase alone cost $25 million.

The first programmer to win a contract for a slot on SCV's cable network was Robert Chua's China Entertainment Television in February 1995, which promised a formula of "no sex, no violence and no news". The contract was formalised in early May. Work on the installation of the cables was underway in March, by then they had signed a contract with Asia Business News. Star TV signed up in mid-late March providing Star World, the Star Chinese Channel and Channel V, as well as the possibility of adding its movie channels. ESPN was signed in late March, at a time when it set up a regional facility in Singapore. Negotiations with The Walt Disney Company were underway, with the opening at the same time of its uplink facilities in Singapore, ahead of the launch of the channel in Taiwan.

SCV also had plans to become a fixed telecommunications operator from April 2002, when the government would lift telecommunications monopolies. In April, 50,000 General Instruments decoders were ordered, cable decoders bought in other countries were incompatible with SCV broadcasts. The decoders also had an authorisation key where parents would select age-appropriate programmes and monitor time spent by children watching television. A headend worth S$850,000 was built in Ayer Rajah, with the capability of receiving up to 45 satellite channels and the TCS channels, the latter of which connected via fibre to Bukit Batok.

Key agreements were signed in May 1995: the Hong Kong-Taiwanese (at the time) TVB Super Channel, which had just started cable broadcasts in Manila, was at an advanced stage; the thirteenth channel to be added was CCTV-4, which benefitted Chinese workers and businessmen; on 18 May 1995, an agreement with the Tamil broadcaster Golden Eagle Communications to carry its channel, Golden Eagle, launched in India in February, over the cable network upon its launch. The Asian version of the Discovery Channel, still doing playout from Hong Kong at the time, was also announced. On 23 May, an agreement with Turner enabled TNT & Cartoon Network and CNN International to be added; alongside the announcement, at a banquet party held by SCV that evening, it was announced that after Tampines, the areas of Pasir Ris and Choa Chu Kang were the next to receive the service, and that installation would be done by Christmas. By then, 100,000 households were able to receive SCV. Negotiations with the Sega Channel were also underway.

At the end of May, SCV had signed an agreement with Worldnet on 1 June with MTV, providing two channels in Mandarin and English, and on 6 June, with Australia Television International, which up until that point only had its news bulletin relayed on NewsVision. All of the channels available were carefully monitored and met the requirements set by the SBA, who reiterated that cable TV had the same censorship standards as free-to-air channels. Moreover, a 14-minute hourly advertising limit was placed on all channels carried on the service. Further SBA compliances included the TCS and TV12 channels at the top of the offer and that every channel should have SBA approval. The first subscribers were wired to the service on 14 June; subscriptions were first accepted on 12 June.

=== Launch of regular cable service ===
On 23 June 1995 at 1pm, SCV's cable service was launched by Brigadier-General George Yeo in Tampines, reaching to 15,000 households in the area's HDB estate, with all 47,000 households expected to be connected by September. Its cabling network exercise cost $500 million; $25 million was spent in the first phase. SCV expected to have 100,000 households connected to its cable network by the end of 1995 with 750,000 households connected in five years. To celebrate the launch of the service, SCV held a three-day fair near Tampines Sogo where potential subscribers had the chance to experience it first-hand. Plans to develop community channels were also on the cards.

SCV's cable TV channel offering in 1995 had over 25 channels divided into three tiers – basic tier, international tier and premium tier. The basic tier consisted of the free channels (Singapore's terrestrial channels, the RTM channels and the Preview Channel) as well as fourteen specialty channels, Asia Business News, BBC World, CNN International, Star Plus, Star Chinese Channel, TVB Super Channel, CETV's Family Channel, TNT & Cartoon Network, Discovery Channel, Prime Sports, ESPN, Channel V and MTV. The international tier carried CCTV-4, TVB Zong Yi (with limited Cantonese programming), Australia Television International, TVRI, NHK, TV3 and Worldnet. The premium tier launched with a new version of VarietyVision. Several channels were pending their approval - two karaoke channels (Channel K TV) in Mandarin and Cantonese (by August 1995), TV5 and Deutsche Welle (dependent on their launch on a satellite covering Asia, scheduled for 1996) and two HBO channels (pending additional negotiations). Subscription to the basic tier was required before gaining access to the higher tiers. The initial offer of 30 channels was considered by The Straits Times' Life! supplement as a "far cry" from cable networks in countries such as the United States, which offered up to 80 channels. In August 1995, the CTN Zhong Tian channel was added. HBO was added later in the month, replacing MovieVision, which was only available on the UHF network up until that point.

Star Movies was absent due to censorship problems, which would force SCV to "sanitise its content to terrestrial sensitivity". At the same time, there was growing concern over the possibility of R(A) movies airing on cable television, under the concern that such movies would attract children.

SCV also had plans to become an internet service provider using the coaxial cable network. The cables used by SCV at launching time were of a higher capacity than Singapore Telecom's extant copper wires. By late August, one out of four families in Tampines had cable TV, but problems with cable wires led to installation problems.

Zee TV was added on 11 September 1995, the first Hindi-language channel on offer, negotiations have been held for months because the channel had to be tailored for Singaporean cultural norms.

Reports emerged in early January 1996 that Rediffusion Singapore had the possibility of using SCV's cable network to deliver its signals, enabling better reception for the NTUC's Radio Heart and RCS's Class 95.

In 1996, SCV had 7,221 subscribers with a 28% penetration rate out of the 25,000 homes that SCV marketed. An agreement was signed with the National Computer Board to provide internet services via television in April.

As of January 1996, 52,271 homes in Tampines and Pasir Ris were connected to SCV. SCV expected to reach 250,000 homes by the end of 1996. Channel KTV, the karaoke channel, was added in February, as part of its basic package. The Eureka Learning Channel launched on 2 September 1996, with educational programming aimed at kids, teens and young adults, with twelve Singaporean programmes at launch and extensive international content. An experimental community channel was tested on 5 May, in conjunction with the opening of the Tampines East Community Club. Community channels also obeyed to the same rules as conventional channels. The channel was provided by SCV but produced by ten three-year undergraduates from the Nanyang Technological University's School of Technological Studies. The previous year, the National Solidarity Party warned against the usage of community channels on cable, increasing viewer perceptions of Singapore being a police state and cause mistrust between authorities and people.

From March to September 1996, a special channel by SCV was broadcast on UHF channel 30 and on the Preview Channel (corresponding to VHF channel 4). Up until this point, the Preview Channel only carried excerpts of programmes. At the same time, SCV announced that its next phase in the cable rollout plan would be in Bukit Panjang; wiring work was scheduled to start in mid-March 1996. Daniel Goh was appointed president on 1 May that year, replacing its first president Randall Coleman. Randall had left SCV due to "differences between partners".

Positive incomes were scheduled for the 1999 fiscal year. The company had been scheduling a two-year period at a loss of $36 million. One year on from launch, SCV had 155,000 homes wired to the service, with 34 channels and a cabling rate of 20,000 homes per month.

Deutsche Welle's channel was added on 1 June 1996 on the international tier. At the time, only 17.5% of subscribers had the package.

A scandal erupted in August 1996 where TV3 complained about the fact that its terrestrial channel was available at a subscription (for the International Pack) of SCV, with the channel demanding it to be available in the free tier. TV3 claimed that SCV could not sue SCV as the reception of broadcasts or cable programmes was not covered by the Singapore Copyright Act. SCV claimed that the practice was legal, and that subscribers could not opt for an individual subscription and could tune to TV3 by antenna.

SCV joined SingTel and the Telecommunications Authority of Singapore for the Singapore ONE (One Network for Everyone) core network project in September 1996. On 1 October, Sun TV joined SCV.

Phoenix Chinese Channel was added on 1 December 1996. SCV and NCB announced on 3 December that from January 1997, a pilot service for buying movie tickets from home computers connected to SCV's internet platform would start. The initial trial was limited to a hundred households in Jurong already wired to the Singapore ONE network. Cinemax and TV5 were added on 1 April 1997; SCV provided a free preview of the latter from 28 to 31 March 1997.

In 1997, SCV aimed to have 90% of 800,000 houses in HDB estates to be connected to SCV cable by the end of 1998. A public trial of the SCV cable modem service started in June 1997.

SCV launched its first in-house sports channel, Football Channel on 9 August 1997, after spending $500,000 worth of rights for coverage of the English football leagues. At the time, Premiere 12 was showing one Premiership match per week, as was the norm in previous seasons.

In 1999, SCV completed the construction of its S$600 million network, and in recognition of its nationwide cabling effort, SCV was granted exclusivity in the provision of pay-TV services until 2002. As the nation developed, Singaporeans began to embrace pay-TV as an additional source of lifestyle entertainment, in addition to other entertainment sources such as cinemas, the internet, and DVD/VCD purchases/rentals. New channels were introduced this year: Japan Entertainment Television on 1 February, Star Movies 1 April, after being rejected in the initial offer, National Geographic on 1 June and on 22 December, a second in-house sports channel, SuperSports, whose regular broadcasts started on 15 January 2000 with its coverage of the 2000 Australian Open. Nickelodeon was added on 9 March 2001.

On 9 May 2001, SCV cut the airtime of TV3, running from 11:30am to 9pm, due to the passing of a December 1999 copyright directive, as well as due to conflicts with US-based distributors, causing blackouts of the morning and late night schedule. The channel's dialect programmes remained intact. Under the new ruling, SCV could not broadcast the blacked out programmes without prior permission from the rights holders. SCV launched its pay-per-view service on channel 37 on 15 October 2001, reserved for movies and concerts. In the first two weeks of April 2002, it offered a package of four European films, in a country whose movie market is dominated by American and Hong Kong productions. In July 2002, SCV announced that, in order to prevent further copyright problems, TV2 and TV3 were to be removed on 22 July. TV1 remained because it had a higher proportion of Malaysian programming than the other removed channels. To compensate for its loss, subscribers gained Disney Channel, with subscribers also opting for Sun TV or TVRI.

=== StarHub TV ===
In 2002, StarHub completed its merger with Singapore Cable Vision and has adopted its name until in 2007, where StarHub Cable Television was renamed to StarHub TV, its current name.

Subscribers raised concerns over the price hike for the 2006 FIFA World Cup, which StarHub claimed it was due to "escalating costs" for its licensing.

StarHub launched its high-definition television service on 18 January 2007, being the first country in South East Asia to offer HD channels. Its initial channel line up were Discovery HD and National Geographic Channel HD. On 24 November 2007, StarHub began airing English Premier League games in HD. StarHub began adding more HD channels in the latter part of 2008.

On 17 February 2009, StarHub announced that their television will be converted to digital and analogue set-top boxes will be terminated by 30 June 2009, beginning a phase of digital television transition in Singapore.

On 30 April 2010, channel numbers for StarHub TV were overhauled into a three-digit numbering system, allowing easier recall for subscribers. The channels were also classified into eight categories based on their genre and first number.

On 1 August 2010, StarHub TV will cease broadcasting the Barclays English Premier League for the 2010/11, 2011/12 and 2012/13 seasons as it did not procure the rights to do so. Its carriage of Goal TV 1, Goal TV 2, ESPN, STAR Sports and STAR Cricket will also cease at the same time. The ESS channels were unavailable on StarHub's platform for three years until in December 2012, it was announced that ESPN, STAR Sports and STAR Cricket will return to StarHub on 14 December on a non-exclusive basis. The channel was revived after StarHub TV acquired its rights to broadcast the 2018-19 season of UEFA Champions League.

Rediffusion Singapore was added to StarHub TV in October 2010 as RediGold, the first FM channel to be broadcast on cable television; however, both Rediffusion and RediGold ceased transmission on 1 May 2012 due to a decline in listenership. Rediffusion resumed its transmission on 11 November 2013, but through internet.

Since 2010, many channels were made for free-viewing for a brief period of time to commemorate a holiday. Its first free preview was held between 28 May to 13 June due to a school holiday. Since then, a weeklong free previewing of channels were held on other major public holidays.

On 31 May 2011, StarHub TV's Preview Channel (Channel 101) became ScreenSingapore Channel for a duration from 1 to 19 June, before reverting to Preview Channel.

Many channels had, over time, ceased broadcast on StarHub TV to make way for newer channels, such as JimJam, JET TV, NEO Cricket, TTV World and MGM. On 15 February 2012, Playin' TV, a television-gaming service channel, was also ceased.

On 18 March 2013, StarHub launched its first fibre-optic IPTV television, beginning another transition of cable television. The IPTV was rolled out to residential customers on 8 April 2015.

In an announcement made on 1 November 2018, cable television will cease transmission by 30 June 2019. However, StarHub followed up with another announcement on 24 June 2019, saying that cable services will end on 30 September 2019 instead, giving consumers until 31 August 2019 to switch to fibre. StarHub completed the move to fibre networks on 30 September 2019.

== In-house channels ==
- Hub Sports
- VV Drama

=== Former ===
- NewsVision
- MovieVision
- Eureka Learning Channel
