= Okto =

Television programming block in Singapore

- Country: Singapore
- Broadcast area: Nationwide
- Network: Mediacorp TV12 (19 October 2008–30 April 2019); Mediacorp TV (1 May 2019–present)
- Headquarters: Mediacorp Campus, 1 Stars Avenue, Singapore 138507

Programming
- Languages: English; Chinese
- Picture format: 1080i HDTV (downscaled to 16:9 576i for the SDTV feed)

History
- Launched: 19 October 2008; 18 years ago (as a standalone channel); 1 May 2019; 7 years ago (as a children's block on Channel 5); 6 February 2021; 5 years ago (as a children's block on Channel 8)
- Replaced: Central (children's, arts and sports programming); Channel i (children's, arts and sports programming, UHF 30 and StarHub TV channel space)
- Closed: 30 April 2019; 7 years ago (as a standalone channel)
- Replaced by: Channel 5, Channel 8 and meWatch (children's and arts programming); Channel 5 and meWatch (sports programming); CNA (arts programming)

Okto is a Singaporean children's programming block broadcast by Mediacorp Channel 5 in English and Mediacorp Channel 8 in Mandarin Chinese.

The brand originally operated as a standalone English-language free-to-air channel from 19 October 2008 to 1 May 2019, serving as a successor to the Kids Central and Arts Central strands aired by Central (whose Tamil language programming had been concurrently spun off as the new channel Vasantham). The channel also occasionally aired sports programming; from 2017, arts programming was subsumed by other Mediacorp channels, resulting in the primetime block primarily airing sports programming.

On 1 May 2019, the channel was discontinued, and Okto transitioned to becoming a children's block on Mediacorp Channel 5, and a content brand on MeWatch. The brand was later extended to Mediacorp Channel 8.

== History ==
In March 2008, MediaCorp announced that it would split its channel Central into two separate channels; a channel serving the Indian community, and a channel focused on arts and children's programming. On 19 October 2008, the channel officially launched as Okto, alongside the new Tamil channel Vasantham. The name Okto was derived from the Greek numeral for "eight", as the channel was on StarHub TV channel 8 (the former EPG slot and channel allotments of the defunct Channel i) and Singtel Mio TV channel 108.

Okto was split into two strands; children's programming (later branded as Okto Jr.) occupied most of the schedule, while programming from evening to closedown focused on arts and cultural programming. In June 2014, coinciding with its rights to selected matches of the FIFA World Cup, the Sports on Okto brand was introduced.

On 1 May 2019, Okto was discontinued as a television channel, with its children's programming becoming a daytime block on Channel 5 under the Okto on 5 branding, and a content brand on Mediacorp's streaming platform Toggle (now MeWatch); previously, Channel 5's daytime programming largely consisted of a simulcast of Mediacorp's news channel CNA. Okto's sports programming was also moved to Toggle and Channel 5. Okto's channel license was subsequently surrendered and its channel frequencies (including those of which originally owned by SPH MediaWorks' TVWorks/Channel i) were recalled by the Infocomm Media Development Authority (IMDA).

On 6 February 2021, the Okto brand was extended to Channel 8's children's programming block 乐乐窝 (Lè Lè Wō), which was rebranded as ‘Okto尽在8' (Okto on 8).

== Programming ==
Since its standalone channel era, Okto mostly aired English-language programmes, with selected series being broadcast in their original language. The channel aired mostly children's programmes, as well as some arts and sports programmes. The channel's target audiences were children aged 4–13, and adults aged 18–39.

From June 2014, the channel also aired sports programming under the OktoSports (formerly Sports on Okto) branding, which featured live and recorded event coverage. In 2017, arts programming was dispersed from Okto to other Mediacorp channels in favour of expanding the nightly OktoSports block, which aired from 9 p.m. to closedown.

In September 2024, expanding upon existing agreements with the company, Mediacorp made its largest-ever acquisition of children's programmes from BBC Studios, covering 150 hours of programming (including series such as Go Jetters, Hey Duggee and JoJo & Gran Gran) to be carried by Okto and meWatch.
