= CNA (TV network) =

Singapore English language news channel

- Type: free-to-air, terrestrial and satellite based news channel
- Country: Singapore
- Broadcast area: Worldwide
- Headquarters: Mediacorp Campus, One-north, Singapore

Programming
- Language: English
- Picture format: 1080i 16:9 HDTV

Ownership
- Owner: Mediacorp
- Sister channels: 5; 8; U; Suria; Vasantham

History
- Launched: 1 March 1999; 27 years ago
- Former names: Channel NewsAsia (1999–2019)

Links
- Webcast: Watch TV; CNA on YouTube
- Website: www.channelnewsasia.com

Availability

Terrestrial
- Digital terrestrial television: UHF CH 33 570MHz DVB-T2 Channel 6 (HD)

Streaming media
- meWATCH: Available on meWATCH website or mobile app (Singapore only)
- YouTube: Available on YouTube

CNA (abbreviated from Channel NewsAsia) is a Singapore-based multinational news channel owned by Mediacorp, the country's state-owned media conglomerate. The network is broadcast in Singapore on free-to-air terrestrial television and Mediacorp's streaming service meWatch, and is distributed internationally via television providers in the Asia–Pacific, as well as streaming and free ad-supported streaming television (FAST) platforms.

The network has been positioned as an alternative to Western-based international media in presenting news from "an Asian perspective." Alongside its main focus as an English-language news television channel, CNA also produces news and current affairs content in Singapore's other official languages of Chinese, Malay, and Tamil, which is distributed via digital outlets and Mediacorp's local channels in the languages. Mediacorp's Channel 5 previously aired a simulcast of CNA during the weekday breakfast hours until 1 May 2019, when it was replaced by an Okto block.

The CNA brand also encompasses digital media properties, including its website and social media outlets, as well as a co-branded news radio station in Singapore (CNA938), original podcasts, and a secondary FAST channel dedicated to original series/documentaries (CNA Originals).

== History ==
=== 1998: Background and launch ===
In 1998, despite the economic recession the region was facing at the time, Television Corporation of Singapore (TCS), the predecessor of Mediacorp, during a meeting of its executives, suggested the creation of a news channel (initially rumoured to be a business channel). Under the initially planned format, the channel was set to provide business news mirroring CNN and CNBC, with a tentative launch date of 1 January 1999.

In October, TCS announced the name of the new service, Channel NewsAsia, and that its cost would be of $20 million in the first year, and $100 million at the long-term period of five years. With the then-upcoming launch of the channel, it was decided that all of Channel 5's current affairs programmes were to move to CNA, leaving only the main news (News 5 Tonight) with only one edition at 9:30pm.

In a surprise move, one of its initial presenters, Christine Tan, left CNA ahead of its launch for CNBC Asia. Two further presenters had left CNA despite heavy promotion for its launch. The launch of the channel was still set to go as planned, but still aired promos featuring the resigned presenters during its test transmissions. The channel's initial slogan was "We know Asia".

Channel NewsAsia launched on 1 March 1999, opening with a speech by Minister of Information and the Arts George Yeo at Raffles Place. Attending the ceremony were CNA staff, TCS executives and representatives from both media and business circles. Woon Tai Ho become CNA's first vice-president. Malaysia reacted to the channel's launch with a new channel to be broadcast on Astro. A few months after launch, in July 1999, jurisdiction of CNA was moved from TCS to the newly created MediaCorp News, in line with the renaming of TCS's holding company, Singapore International Media, to Media Corporation of Singapore and the creation of "strategic business units".

The channel initially focused on Singapore. It started to be distributed in other Asian countries and Australia by satellite on 28 September 2000, after a decision taken on 1 March, with the hopes of promoting it as a pan-Asian network. Public opinion was divided over its editorial independence, as the channel was touted as a government mouthpiece. In its early years, the channel had a strong emphasis on business news, but has deviated from the initial purpose and changed to a general news channel.

=== 2000 to 2003 : Increase in popularity ===
Jill Neubronner, who was also a newscaster and reporter for TCS since 1995, left CNA in December 2000 for CNN. The channel's ratings increased in Indonesia over a breaking story in late July 2001, with 464,000 viewers tuning in. During the post-National Day period, Singapore Tonight brought back former television news presenters TC Koh, Dorothy Tan, Norman Lim and Duncan Watt, sitting alongside then-current presenter Sharon Tong. The plan was conceived by Chay Ting Nee, who emulated it after seeing a US station he worked at do the same. By late September 2001, the channel had achieved international targets two years ahead of schedule, with 12 million households and 35,000 hotel rooms in 15 countries receiving the service, showing strong demand for news from an Asian perspective. Its output in Singapore, including the website, have reached record figures for the time, with its coverage of the aftermath of the September 11 attacks being seen by 35% of the Singaporean population, with Asia Tonight becoming the second most-watched English programme on local TV. Ratings were several times higher than foreign networks available on cable, and its website received 9.3 million page views. The attacks gave prominence to the network, reaching audience levels higher than BBC World and CNN International.

The channel started broadcasts to Hong Kong on 1 July 2002, five years after the handover, on Hong Kong Cable Television. The channel launched in Brunei on 30 September 2002 on the Kristal TV platform, available on its UHF platform on a part-time basis. The following month it signed a contract with Indonesian news network Metro TV, enabling the channel to have access to footage and programmes from CNA, with potential co-operation agreements between the two on the cards. In December, selected programming became available to SingNet BroadBand subscribers. Broadcasts in Taiwan started on 1 February 2003 with CNA being a programme provider for Eastern Television's Digital Channel, which also included five other foreign news providers. On 17 April 2003, CNAMobile was launched, the first SMS headlines service in Singapore.

The network reached new records in April 2003 due to the SARS-related specials. The specials drew in 1.4 million viewers accounting for its highest cumulative reach so far of 24%. In August 2003, Mediacorp signed an agreement with AsiaSat to deliver CNA on AsiaSat-3S effective 1 September 2003. With this arrangement, broadcasts on Palapa C2 and APSTAR IIR would cease as AsiaSat-3S provided total digital support. An agreement with MiTV in Malaysia was signed in August 2004.

Mobile services started in February 2003 for SingTel Mobile subscribers and later in June 2004 as a target for mobile TV reception for Nokia phones, by means of an embedded tuner developed by Mediacorp Technologies.

=== 2004 to 2018: Expansion into region ===
Broadcasts in Thailand started in October 2004, after an agreement with the Thai Cable Television Association, which at the time comprised 170 member operators.

By the time of its fifth anniversary, the network had reached 16 million households in 18 territories, with, in Singapore alone, attracting attention because of its mix of stories (Singapore, Asia, rest of the world) over various topics. In November 2004, it started broadcasting to China after an agreement was signed with the China International Television Corporation in May. By 2005 the channel was facing challenges: the channel had two markets that were difficult to penetrate (South Korea and Japan) due to the English-language barrier, as well as the possibility of launching a Mandarin version of CNA to improve the brand's reception in the region.

The channel rebranded on 17 July 2006. The virtual set was removed and replaced by a physical "hard set".

For the channel's tenth anniversary, the channel premiered After 12, about nightlife in Asian cities, the documentary Rice is Life and Channel NewsAsia @ 10, a documentary about its history and growth. CNA received praise from the Programme Advisory Committee (Pace) on 2 September 2009 for, among other things, its coverage of the 2008 United States presidential election and the political situation in Malaysia and Thailand.

In August 2012, CNA agreed to be broadcast in Myanmar through satellite-TV operator Sky Net. CNA opened its Myanmar news bureau in the capital Yangon in October 2013 – the bureau officially opened in January 2014 – as only one of four foreign news organisations licensed to operate in the country at the time.

On 21 January 2013, CNA underwent a major relaunch, introducing a new studio at the Marina Bay Financial Centre, a new Mumbai bureau, an expansion in programming, and the new slogan "Understand Asia". With the changes, CNA added additional news and current affairs programmes focusing on business and the "dynamism and progress" of Asia, and added the new late-night newscast News Pulse (which would feature coverage of international headlines, predominantly involving the Americas and Europe) to expand into a 24-hour service. Managing director Debra Soon explained that "as the focus of the world economy shifts towards Asia, we believe we are well positioned to deliver what we've been doing daily since 1999, and help audiences around the world better Understand Asia."

In July 2014, CNA opened its Vietnam bureau. Other bureaus the channel had opened at the time were Beijing, Hong Kong, Jakarta, Seoul and Tokyo; unofficial offices were also maintained in other cities such as Mumbai, New Delhi and Washington D.C.

In September 2014, the channel announced plans to expand its studio in Kuala Lumpur, Malaysia, into a fully functional satellite office with high-definition capabilities.

On 26 May 2015, CNA began broadcasting in high definition. In July 2015, CNA's reach was placed at 58 million households in 26 countries. CNA began broadcasting in India on 19 November 2015, through satellite operator Tata Sky. The move extended the network's reach to 14 million households in India.

On 1 August 2018, CNA was launched on Astro in Malaysia. It stayed on Channel 533 and moved to Channel 515 on 1 April 2020.

=== 2019 to present: Rebranding and subsuming newspaper ===
In March 2019, marking the network's 20th anniversary, Mediacorp announced that Channel NewsAsia would officially rebrand as "CNA" full-time, citing a need to abandon a "TV-centric" identity to emphasise its multi-platform operations. This would include the relaunch of its news radio station 938Now as CNA938, and the upcoming citizen journalism initiative Tell CNA.

In March 2024, the channel marked its 25th anniversary; CNA announced plans to further expand its presence in the United States, Canada, and the United Kingdom, launch a website in the Indonesian language (which will leverage AI-based translation software developed in partnership with the Agency for Science, Technology and Research), and bringing back the program East Asia Tonight beginning in April. The channel formally launched in the UK on the Channelbox platform on Freeview in late April 2024 as a free ad-supported streaming television (FAST) channel. The network made its formal launch to North America on 13 June, with a FAST launch by June 2025.

On 28 August 2024, it was announced that Mediacorp's digital publication and former newspaper Today would merge its operations into CNA effective 1 October 2024, with the brand being repurposed as a "digital long-form weekend magazine".

According to YouGov's Best Brands Rankings 2026 report, CNA took ninth place.

In March 2026, CNA announced that it doubled its global footprint in two years and have expanded the CNA Originals channel into Europe.

== Visual identity ==
The logo of the channel is a red uppercase A, heightening the Asia in the official channel name. The A is shaped like an open delta whose crossbar is lowered to represent an emerging Asia. The A is painted red representing its auspicious status in Asian cultures, as well as being "striking and bold". The channel's name is written in black, representing its status as a brand of record. Its first rebrand was in September 2000, made by British firm English & Pockett. The logo was updated in 2019.

== Reputation ==
CNA has been noted for its pro-government bias in Singapore. In its 12th biennial report released on 2 September 2009, the Programme Advisory Committee for English Programmes stipulated that "the broadcaster was adopting a conservative and careful approach in its reports and programmes", while being labelled as the "voice of the Government".

A 2020 Reuters Institute survey of 15 media outlets in Singapore found that CNA had the largest online reach and highest trust rating among local respondents.

The 2026 ''Reuters Institute Digital News Report'' described CNA as Singapore's most-used online news source, with a weekly online reach of 47%. The report also ranked CNA as the country's most trusted news brand, giving it a brand trust score of 78%, four percentage points higher than in 2025.

=== Accolades ===
- 2005 Beijing News Awards: excellence in reporting (two awards)

== Broadcast feeds ==
CNA operates two broadcast feeds; a domestic feed is carried on terrestrial and subscription television in Singapore, which contains Singapore-specific news programming (such as Singapore Tonight) and promos for Mediacorp channels and properties. The international feed opts out of these programs, but also carries a simulcast of Channel 5's coverage of the Singapore National Day Parade annually on 9 August. Most cable and satellite systems carry the international feed in Asia. It is also streamed on CNA's YouTube channel worldwide.

== See also ==
- Media of Singapore
- List of world news channels
- List of public broadcasters by country
