= World Watch =

Australian television news block

- Genre: World news
- Countries of origin: Australia; International
- Original language: Various

Production
- Running time: 20-60 minutes (per program)

Original release
- Network: SBS (1993–present); SBS2 (2009–present); SBS WorldWatch (2022–2026)
- Release: 24 August 1993 – present

World Watch, or WorldWatch, is a programming block on SBS and SBS2, and a standalone television channel in Australia, that carries news bulletins from countries around the world. The World Watch service gives viewers the opportunity to see news bulletins in their native language. The majority of these bulletins are produced by public or state broadcasters.

== History ==
The WorldWatch program began on 24 August 1993 with news bulletins from the People's Republic of China, the United States, Germany and Russia.

In June 2002, SBS launched the SBS World News Channel, providing repeats of aired bulletins on SBS in addition to updated bulletins.

In October 2003, Filipino, Vietnamese and Arabic were added to the World Watch schedule. However, the Vietnamese service was controversial as the broadcaster chosen was the government-controlled VTV4, which was seen as deeply offensive and seen as propaganda to many Vietnamese Australians who fled after the Vietnam War. It was quickly removed on 17 October.

In 2009, SBS replaced the World News Channel with SBS 2 (now SBS2), and the bulletins also moved to the new channel under the "World Watch" banner. Bulletins air from 6:00am to 6:00pm, whereas SBS airs the bulletins between 5:00am and 1:30pm.

In 2010, SBS added three new languages: Portuguese, Urdu and Hindi.

In October 2015, SBS added eleven new bulletins to the World Watch schedule: African English, Armenian, Bengali, Bosnian, Nepali, Punjabi, Romanian, Sinhalese, Somali, Tamil and Thai; and created an English language line-up on SBS, which moved the Cantonese, Japanese, Korean and Mandarin bulletins from SBS to SBS 2.

Usually, before a WorldWatch bulletin, an intro animation revealing the city and country of origin of the bulletin, sometimes also including the full title of the bulletin, is shown, as well as a disclaimer, which, following the previously mentioned backlash over the choice of Vietnamese news broadcasts, explains that the bulletin may not reflect the network's standards and may include distressing content.

After a bulletin ends, information about other airtimes for that bulletin and airtimes for the bulletin language's SBS Radio program are shown, explained by a voiceover in the bulletin's native language. If the bulletin is in English, then no relevant information as mentioned is shown.

In early 2022, SBS announced that they are relocating most of non-English news bulletins from the World Watch programming block into their newly launched in-house news channel SBS WorldWatch, which launched on 23 May 2022, along with SBS-produced local news in both Arabic and Mandarin (which the latter two was premiered early on SBS On Demand since earlier that year), as both SBS and SBS2 are making some space for special events such as live sports that has been interrupt World Watch news bulletins (see below), although English news bulletins from international news channels (not to be confused with SBS-produced SBS World News) are still available to watch in the morning and midday.

== Bulletins ==
In determining the World Watch schedule, the policy of SBS has been to match the selection of news programs with the ethnic composition of the Australian population. The World Watch schedule includes news bulletins from Armenia, Bangladesh, Bosnia and Herzegovina, Canada, Croatia, France, Fiji, Germany, Greece, Hungary, India, Indonesia, Italy, Japan, Macedonia, Malta, Nepal, the Netherlands, New Zealand, Pakistan, the Philippines, Poland, Portugal, Qatar, Romania, Serbia, Spain, Somalia, South Korea, Sri Lanka, Thailand, Turkey, Ukraine, the United Kingdom, and the United States.

The programs are usually broadcast unedited, and between the times of 2:30am and mid-afternoon. However, SBS does edit programs under "exceptional circumstances" where it breaches broadcasting regulations and its Codes of Practices. In addition, commercials and sponsorship messages are edited out, while the end of the program will also be cut out when the program runs overtime in its timeslot. Also, due to SBS broadcast rights to certain sporting events, particular bulletins can be axed from schedule to allow airtime for the sporting events. Very rarely does SBS ever fill in broadcast gaps with WorldWatch bulletins.

In case that SBS does not receive the program on time, the program's timeslot would be filled with either its WeatherWatch program or English-language programming from DW-TV in Germany.

=== Current bulletins ===
==== English News bulletins ====
Network	Country of origin	Network/Broadcaster	Program name
SBS	Australia	APAC Network	APAC Weekly
SBS	France	France 24	PrimeNews Paris
SBS	Germany	DW (DW English)	DW News
SBS	India	DD (DD India)	News Night
SBS	Japan	NHK (NHK World-Japan)	NHK Newsline
SBS	Philippines	ABS-CBN (ANC)	The World Tonight
SBS	Qatar	Al Jazeera	News
SBS	United Kingdom	BBC (BBC One/BBC News)	BBC News at Six
SBS	United Kingdom	BBC (BBC One/BBC News)	BBC News at Ten
SBS	United States	PBS	PBS News Hour
SBS	United States	PBS	Washington Week
SBS2	Canada	APTN	APTN National News Weekend
SBS2	Canada	CBC (CBC TV/CBC News Network)	The National
SBS2	Fiji	FBC (FBC TV)	FBC News
SBS2	France	France 24	Eye on Africa
SBS2	Germany	DW (DW English)	Global Us
SBS2	Qatar	Al Jazeera	Newshour
SBS2	Turkey	TRT (TRT World)	Newshour
SBS2	New Zealand	Whakaata Māori	Te Ao with Moana
SBS2	United States	Indian Country Today	ICT Newscast

==== Non-English news bulletins on SBS On Demand ====
Following the announcement that the SBS WorldWatch linear channel would close on 18 September 2026, all of the non-English news bulletins only became available to stream through SBS On Demand.

Language	Country of origin	Network/Broadcaster	Program name
Arabic	France	France 24	نشرةالأخبار (Nashrat Al'akhbar)
Arabic	France	France 24	صباح فرانس 24 (Sabah France 24)
Armenian	Armenia	ARMTV	Լուրեր (Lurer)
Bengali	Bangladesh	Channel i	সংবাদ (Sambāda)
Bosnian	Bosnia and Herzegovina	BHRT (BHT 1)	Dnevnik
Croatian	Croatia	HRT (HRT 1)	Dnevnik HRT
Dutch	Netherlands	NPO/NOS (NPO 1 via BVN)	NOS Journaal
Filipino	Philippines	Kapamilya Channel, ALLTV, A2Z (via TFC)	TV Patrol
French	France	France Télévisions (France 2)	Journal de 20 heures
French	France	France 24	Paris Direct
German	Germany	ZDF	heute-journal
Greek	Greece	ERT (ERT1 via ERT World)	ΕΡΤ Ειδήσεις (ERT Eidiseis)
Gujarati	India	DD (DD Girnar)	ઇવનિંગ ન્યૂઝ (Evening News)
Hindi	India	Aaj Tak	नॉनस्टॉप 100 (Top 100 News; lit. Nonstop 100)
Indonesian	Indonesia	TVRI (TVRI Nasional)	Klik Indonesia Petang
Italian	Italy	RAI (Rai 1)	TG1
Japanese	Japan	NHK (NHK G via NHK World Premium)	NHK News 7
Korean	South Korea	YTN (via YTN WORLD)	뉴스N이슈 (News N Issue)
Macedonian	North Macedonia	MRT (MRT 1)	Dnevnik MRT
Malayalam	India	DD (DD Malayalam)	വാർത്തകൾ (Vārttakaḷ)
Maltese	Malta	PBS (TVM)	L-Aħbarijiet
Nepali	Nepal	Nepal Television	नेपाल टेलिभिजन समाचार (Nepal Television News)
Polish	Poland	Polsat Group (Polsat/Polsat News)	Wydarzenia
Portuguese	Portugal	RTP (RTP1 via RTP Mundo)	Telejornal
Punjabi	India	PTC News	PTC News
Romanian	Romania	TVR (TVR 1 via TVRi)	Telejurnal
Russian	Germany	DW (DW Russian)	новости (Novosti)
Serbian	Serbia	RTS (RTS1 via RTS.rs)	Дневник 2 (Dnevnik 2)
Sinhalese	Sri Lanka	SLRC (Rupavahini)	රූපවාහිනී ප්‍රවෘත්ති (Rupavahini News)
Spanish	Spain	RTVE (La 1 via TVE Internacional)	Telediario
Spanish	France; Colombia	France 24 (Español)	El Mundo Ahora (The World Now)
Tamil	India	Polimer TV	செய்திகள் (Ceytikaḷ)
Telugu	India	DD (DD Yadagiri)	వార్తలు (Vārtalu)
Thai	Thailand	Thai PBS	Thai PBS News
Turkish	Turkey	TRT (TRT Haber)	Öǧle Ana Haber
Ukrainian	Ukraine	Suspilne (Pershyi)	Suspilne News; United News (2022-2024)
Urdu	Pakistan	PTV (PTV Home/PTV News via PTV Global)	Khabarnama

=== Currently suspended ===
Language	Country of origin	Broadcaster	Program
English	China	CGTN (Note: In early 2021, SBS suspended its Chinese-sourced Mandarin and English bulletins from CCTV and CGTN in response to a complaint from a human rights group that the channels were broadcasting "forced confessions." CGTN bulletin for 6:30am timeslot was later replaced with English-language Deutsche-Welle bulletin instead.)	The World Today
Mandarin	China	CCTV (CCTV-4)	中国新闻 (China News)
English	Russia	Russia Today (Note: Programming from NTV and Russia Today was suspended on 25 February 2022 due to the Russian invasion of Ukraine following feedback from Russian-speaking viewers. However, Russian-language programmes are still being offered on SBS Radio.)	Live simulcast
Russian	Russia	NTV	Сегодня (Segodnya)

=== Former bulletins ===
Language	Country of origin	Broadcaster
Arabic	Lebanon	TL
Arabic	United Arab Emirates	Dubai TV (Note: Currently available on SBS On Demand)
Cantonese	Hong Kong	ATV
Cantonese	Hong Kong	TVB (TVB Jade International)
English	Fiji	Fiji TV (Fiji One)
English	New Zealand	TVNZ (TVNZ 1)
English	United States	ABC
Filipino	Philippines	NBN (now PTV)
French	France	TV5Monde
German	Germany	DW (DW Deutsch)
Greek	Cyprus	CyBC
Greek	Greece	ANT1 (via ANT1 Pacific)
Hindi	India	NDTV (NDTV India)
Hindi	India	DD (DD News)
Hungarian	Hungary	MTVA (Duna/M1 via Duna World)
Latin American Spanish (Note: Listed as "Latin American News")	Chile	TVN
Polish	Poland	TVP
Somali	Somalia	Universal TV
Tamil	India	DD (DD Podhigai)
Vietnamese	Vietnam	VTV (via VTV4)
