= Television in Timor-Leste =

Television was introduced to Timor-Leste when it was under Indonesian control in 1978. After Indonesia relinquished its control in 1999, the station was given over to the United Nations Transitional Administration in East Timor (UNTAET) and, upon independence, to the current RTTL. Private and subscription television appeared in the 2010s.

== Overview ==
=== Indonesian control ===
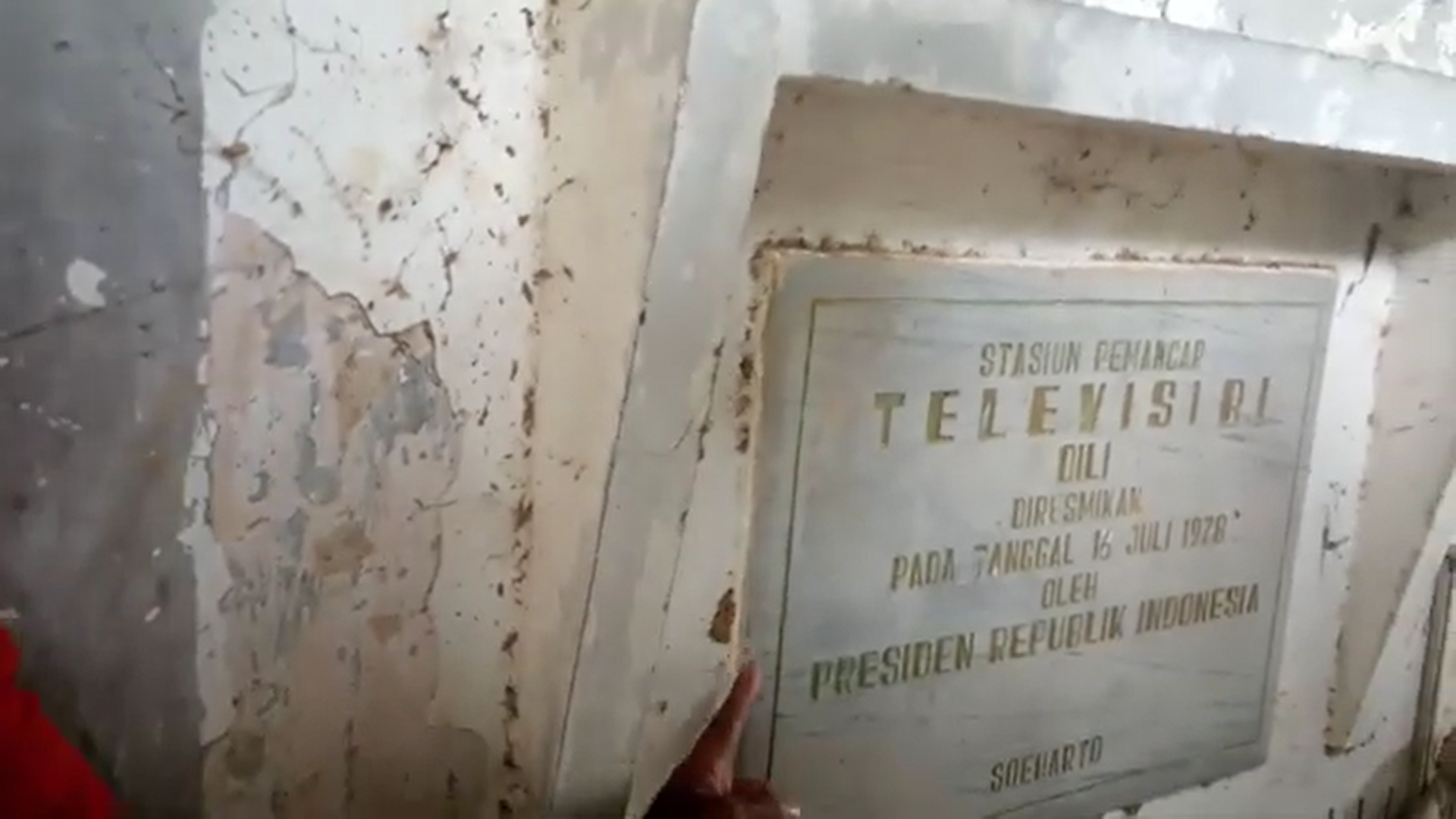
Inscription of the inauguration of TVRI Dili station at the former TVRI Maribia building, Dili

TVRI Dili was established by Television of the Republic of Indonesia, the Indonesian state broadcaster, on 16 July 1978 as a relay station receiving its programming from Jakarta. Located in the Maribia neighborhood, it started broadcasting precisely when Suharto made his first visit to Dili. Within five years, TVRI established relay stations throughout the province: Maliana, Baucau, Lospalos, Suai, Viqueque, and Oecusse in 1979-1980 and 1982–1983.

In January 1996, RTP Internacional started broadcasting in Timor, featuring messages from António Guterres and a leader of the Timorese independence movement. The move came shortly after it launched on the AsiaSat-2 satellite. Antara reported on 9 February that Indonesian commercial channel RCTI eyed competing with the channel if it started an English-language service. By 1998, the TVRI station in Dili had ceased uplinking its local programming by satellite, which it broadcast for half an hour a day, ahead of the upcoming referendum.

=== Transitional phase (UNTAET) ===
It's not clear when exactly TVRI Dili shut down, as RRI closed its station there on 23 September 1999, and, the following day, ABRI troops withdrew from the island due to the positive outcome of the referendum, favoring its independence. Televisão UNTAET was also known under the Tetum name TV Timor-Lorosa'e (TVTL). TV UNTAET produced a videotaped service originating out of Dili and sent its tapes to all thirteen districts, receiving its productions on delay. It aired coverage of the electoral debates in Dili in 2001. The service started with four staff and one hour of programming a week in 2000, while by 2001, it had been operating a 24-hour service in Dili with the videotape service continuing elsewhere in the country with three hours of programming.

In January 2001, RTP Internacional started its digital satellite broadcasts, causing RTP to distribute digital satellite receivers to the Portuguese mission in Timor in order to continue watching the channel. Some of its programs, such as Jornal da Tarde (which airs in the evening in the local time zone) were already being relayed by TVTL.

=== Early years of independence and TVTL/RTTL monopoly ===
The year 2000 saw the creation of Rádio UNTAET and Televisão UNTAET. At midnight on 1 June 2002, shortly after its independence on 21 May, Rádio Nacional de Timor-Leste (RNTL) and Televisão de Timor-Leste (TVTL) were created. Gabriela Cascarralão was appointed TVTL's director, while the amount of programming in Portuguese and Tetum would increase as a result of the new state corporation. The number of programs in Indonesian and English was set to decrease. It was expected that the first Portuguese-language news bulletin would air on the channel in mid-July. The TVTL transmitter network consisted of leftovers from TVRI's infrastructure under Indonesian rule, in Dili on channel 7, as well as having a relay station on channel 12 in Baucau.

TVTL did not have the budget to carry the 2002 FIFA World Cup. Local cafés and restaurants took the toll owing to the lack of reliable coverage of the matches, while some locals had to use high-powered satellite dishes to watch matches relayed from the Australian SBS network. On 1 September 2005, it joined the Asiavision news gathering network.

=== Private sector ===
On 6 October 2009, Suara Timor Lorosa'e started its own TV station, STL TV, on UHF channel 40 in Dili. On 25 June 2015, Televisão Educação Timor (TVET) started broadcasting, the successor of video projects established by the São Miguel Arcanjo College in 2009. Since launch, the college houses its facilities.

The Jorge Serrano-led Grupo de Média Nacional established GMN TV at an unknown date in 2017. As of 2018, GMN was one of the largest groups in the country but was suffering the consequences of a political impasse that affected the national economy. In 2023, the channel started producing Aprender é di'ak, a Portuguese-language program aimed at increasing interest in the language among children.

The country's first subscription television operator, Eto Telco, was launched by Esperança Timor Oan on 23 February 2016. The company operates two channels exclusive to the platform, generalist channel Eto+ and sports channel Eto Super. The service launched with a 70-channel offer and a pledge to increase the relevance of the Portuguese language in the country, carrying programming with Portuguese subtitles and starting negotiations with RTP to carry RTP Internacional full-time and, at a later date, SIC Internacional and TVI Internacional. Up until then, subscription television was limited to illegal satellite dishes carrying Indonesian TV channels, such as TVRI Nasional, TVRI East Nusa Tenggara, TVRI West Nusa Tenggara, TVRI Bali, TVRI South Sulawesi, TVRI Southeast Sulawesi, TVRI Gorontalo, TVRI Maluku, TVRI 3, TVRI 4, ANTV, tvOne, Metro TV, MNCTV, Global TV, iNews TV, SCTV, Indosiar, O Channel, Trans TV, Trans7, CNN Indonesia, Spacetoon Indonesia, Kompas TV, NET., RTV, BeritaSatu and Nusantara TV.

== See also ==
- Telecommunications in Timor-Leste
