= SBS WorldWatch =

Australian television news channel

- Logo used from 2022 to 2026
- Country: Australia
- Network: SBS Television

Programming
- Language: Various
- Picture format: 576i SDTV

Ownership
- Owner: Special Broadcasting Service
- Sister channels: SBS; SBS HD; SBS2; SBS World Movies; SBS Food; NITV

History
- Launched: 23 May 2022; 4 years ago
- Closed: 18 September 2026; 57 days ago
- Replaced by: SBS On Demand

Links
- Website: www.sbs.com.au/aboutus/sbs-worldwatch

Availability At time of closure

Terrestrial
- Freeview: Channel 35

SBS WorldWatch was an Australian free-to-air television channel owned and operated by the Special Broadcasting Service (SBS). The channel shows multilingual international news bulletins in more than 30 languages, as well as two local bulletins in Mandarin and Arabic.

== History ==
In early 2022, SBS officially launched their own Arabic and Mandarin local news bulletins on SBS On Demand and announced the launch of the WorldWatch channel. The channel would also offer non-English news bulletins in more than 30 languages from around the world; most of these were transferred from the World Watch programming block, which had aired on SBS and SBS2. The channel was launched on 23 May 2022 on channel 35, along with the SBS-produced Arabic and Mandarin bulletins. Both SBS and SBS2 continued to air English news bulletins from international news channels in morning and midday timeslots under the current World Watch block.

On 24 August 2026, SBS announced that the SBS WorldWatch channel would close on 18 September 2026. The bulletins and broadcasts continue to be carried by SBS's social media and YouTube channels, along with SBS On Demand, along with each individual broadcaster's own distribution channels independent of SBS (another likely reason for the wind-down of the channel).

== Programming ==
=== News bulletins ===
==== Repeat programs ====
(in English language with Arabic and Mandarin subtitles)

- Dateline
- Insight
- The Feed
- Small Business Secrets

==== International news bulletins at closing time ====
Language	Country of origin	Network/Broadcaster	Program name
Arabic	France	France 24	نشرةالأخبار (Nashrat Al'akhbar)
Arabic	France	France 24	صباح فرانس 24 (Sabah France 24)
Armenian	Armenia	ARMTV (Armenia 1)	Լուրեր (Lurer)
Bengali	Bangladesh	Channel i	সংবাদ (Sambāda)
Bosnian	Bosnia and Herzegovina	BHRT (BHT 1)	Dnevnik
Croatian	Croatia	HRT (HRT 1)	Dnevnik HRT
Dutch	Netherlands	NPO/NOS (NPO 1 via BVN)	NOS Journaal
English	Germany	DW (DW English)	Late-night live simulcast
English	France	France 24	Late-night live simulcast
Filipino	Philippines	Kapamilya Channel, ALLTV, A2Z (via TFC)	TV Patrol
French	France	France Télévisions (France 2)	Journal de 20 heures
French	France	France 24	Paris Direct
German	Germany	ZDF	heute-journal
Greek	Greece	ERT (ERT1/ERT News via ERT Cosmos)	ΕΡΤ Ειδήσεις (ERT Eidiseis)
Gujarati	India	DD (DD Girnar)	ઇવનિંગ ન્યૂઝ (Evening News)
Hindi	India	Aaj Tak	नॉनस्टॉप 100 (Top 100 News)
Indonesian	Indonesia	TVRI (TVRI Nasional)	Klik Indonesia Petang
Italian	Italy	RAI (Rai 1)	TG1
Japanese	Japan	NHK (NHK G via NHK World Premium)	NHK News 7
Korean	South Korea	YTN (via YTN WORLD)	뉴스N이슈 (News N Issue)
Macedonian	North Macedonia	MRT (MRT 1)	Dnevnik MRT
Malayalam	India	DD (DD Malayalam)	വാർത്തകൾ (Vārttakaḷ)
Maltese	Malta	PBS (TVM)	L-Aħbarijiet
Nepali	Nepal	Nepal Television	नेपाल टेलिभिजन समाचार (Nepal Television News)
Polish	Poland	Polsat Group (Polsat/Polsat News)	Wydarzenia
Portuguese	Portugal	RTP (RTP1 via RTP Mundo)	Telejornal
Punjabi	India	PTC News	PTC News
Romanian	Romania	TVR (TVR 1 via TVRi)	Telejurnal
Serbian	Serbia	RTS (RTS1)	Дневник 2 (Dnevnik 2)
Sinhalese	Sri Lanka	SLRC (Rupavahini)	රූපවාහිනී ප්‍රවෘත්ති (Rupavahini News)
Spanish	Spain	RTVE (La 1 via TVE Internacional)	Telediario
Tamil	India	Polimer TV	செய்திகள் (Ceytikaḷ)
Telugu	India	DD (DD Yadagiri)	వార్తలు (Vārtalu)
Thai	Thailand	Thai PBS	Thai PBS News
Turkish	Turkey	TRT (TRT Haber)	Öǧle Ana Haber
Ukrainian	Ukraine	Suspilne (Pershyi)	Суспільне Студія (Suspilne Studiya)
Urdu	Pakistan	PTV (PTV Home/PTV News via PTV Global)	Khabarnama

==== Former local and international news bulletins ====
Language	Country of origin	Network/Broadcaster	Program name
Arabic	Australia	SBS	SBS عربي News (SBS Arabic News)
Cantonese	Hong Kong	TVB (TVB Jade International) (Note: Currently available on SBS On Demand)	TVB News Bulletin (overseas edition)
French	France	TV5Monde	64' Le Monde en français
German	Germany	DW (DW Deutsch)	Der Tag
Hindi	India	DD (DD News)	न्यूज़ @ 10 (News @ 10)
Hungarian	Hungary	MTVA (Duna/M1 via Duna World)	Híradó
Mandarin	Australia	SBS	SBS 中文 News (SBS Mandarin News)
Somali	Somalia	Universal TV	Warka
Tamil	India	DD (DD Podhigai)	செய்திகள் (Ceytikal)

== See also ==
- SBS World News Channel, a similar channel which ran from 2002 to 2009
