= TVRI World =

Indonesian television channel

- Country: Indonesia
- Broadcast area: Nationwide; International; Southeast Asia
- Headquarters: Jakarta, Indonesia

Programming
- Languages: English (main); Indonesian (secondary)
- Picture format: 1080i HDTV (downscaled to 16:9 576i for the SDTV feed)

Ownership
- Owner: LPP TVRI
- Sister channels: TVRI; TVRI Sport

History
- Launched: 21 December 2010; 15 years ago (as TVRI 3)
- Former names: TVRI 3 (2010–2019); TVRI Kanal 3 (2019–2021)

Availability

Terrestrial
- Digital terrestrial television: Various between cities
- Virtual channel: 3 (some cities)

Streaming media
- TVRI Klik: Watch live

TVRI World is an Indonesian television channel owned by public broadcaster TVRI, catered for domestic and international audiences. The English-language channel is currently on its trial broadcast, with its planned launching in 2024. The channel is domestically available in digital terrestrial, satellite, and the TVRI Klik streaming service.

== History ==
=== Conception ===
When TVRI was still directly under the Department of Information, TVRI broadcasts for foreigners living in Indonesia have been carried out since 1983, when TVRI Programa 2 was launched in Jakarta (which later became the predecessor of TVRI Jakarta) and Bandung, West Java (later on the basis for TVRI West Java) as the country's second TV station. The main programming at that time was English News Service, an English news program that aired for 30 minutes, airing the day's top stories from all over Indonesia and around the world. TVRI Denpasar (now TVRI Bali), the network's provincial station in Denpasar, Bali, was also known to broadcast a similar news program, which today exists under the brands Bali News and BaliVision. English News Service would later move to TVRI main channel and continued until 2021 only to return in 2024 under the name Focus Today.

In the early 1990s, a plan for the third channel of TVRI after its main channel (with some local programming provided by TVRI local stations) and TVRI Programa 2 was put forward by TVRI director Ishadi S.K. According to a Tempo Publishing book, he envisioned the "Programa 3 TVRI" as an upcoming television channel by TVRI as well as "educational television". However, the channel further description, including its content, was not stated:

"Imagine if later in Jakarta there were TVRI who operate two programs (channels). Then RCTI, and later there will be TVRI Programa 3. Then an educational television..."

Meanwhile, another idea to launch an international television station from Indonesia has existed at least since 1997, although not directly related to TVRI. Act Number 24 of 1997 on Broadcasting which was passed by the People's Representative Council (DPR) mandated the establishment of the Televisi Siaran Internasional Indonesia (Indonesian International Broadcast Television, abbreviated as TSII) as an international television station. TSII was one of the four "government broadcasting institutions" along with RRI, TVRI, and the Radio Siaran Internasional Indonesia (Indonesian International Broadcast Radio, abbreviated as RSII), and was one of the organic work units under the Department of Information. However, TSII did not materialize until Act Number 32 of 2002 on Broadcasting replaced Act Number 24 of 1997; in the new law, TSII is no longer mentioned.

=== TVRI 3/TVRI Kanal 3 ===
TVRI Kanal 3 logo (2019–2021)

The "TVRI third channel" plan only became a reality in 2010 when TVRI 3, as it was called, was launched as one of two initial digital television channels set up by TVRI following the government plan to introduce digital television in Indonesia, as well as one of the Indonesian first digital terrestrial television channels. The channel, who was intended to broadcast documentary and cultural programming, was launched on 21 December 2010 as the first Indonesian digital broadcast is launched in Jakarta, Surabaya (East Java) and Batam (Riau Islands). Together with its sister channel TVRI 4 (currently TVRI Sport) as well as the digital broadcast of TVRI Nasional and local TVRI stations, the channel was officially launched by President Susilo Bambang Yudhoyono, Minister of Communications and Information Technology Tifatul Sembiring and Chief Director of TVRI Imas Sunarya. A communication science lecturer at the University of Indonesia, Ade Armando, had been questioned the launch, given the government's lack of attention to the network and its lack of popularity at the time.

In 2019, TVRI 3 appeared to change its name to TVRI Kanal 3 (literally "TVRI Channel 3") as TVRI rebrands itself on late March 2019. The channel was also referred to as Kanal 3 TVRI Budaya.

=== TVRI World ===
An international channel plan for TVRI has been originally stated in Government Regulation No. 13 of 2005, one of the basic laws regarding TVRI. However, a more serious efforts by TVRI to make the channel a reality were at least appeared in 2018, where TVRI World was included in its revised strategic plan. TVRI initially targeted TVRI World to start broadcasting in 2019, although it had to be postponed. In 2019, the director of programming and news at the time Apni Jaya Putra again targeted TVRI World's premiere broadcast on 1 January 2020. The channel was originally planned to use TVRI Jakarta's frequency for 6 hours.

On 16 October 2020, TVRI announced plan to use TVRI Kanal 3 for TVRI World broadcasts. In the announcement, the network's president director Iman Brotoseno said that TVRI World would be a channel for class A and B audiences at home and abroad containing "promotion, tourism, arts, culture, news about Indonesia, and current issues". Until early 2021, TVRI World is only had its presence on YouTube, and there is no sign of the channel's launch yet.

TVRI World started a trial broadcast in June 2021 on TVRI Kanal 3, and was planned to start broadcasting 24 hours on 17 August 2021. Its on-screen graphic also began replaced into TVRI World logo. However, TVRI World didn't launch on 17 August. The implementation of Community Activities Restrictions Enforcement, especially in Jakarta, from July to August 2021 also affected the trial broadcast.

In a hearing with Commission I of the DPR on 21 September 2021, TVRI again extended the target of TVRI World launching until the 2022 launch for the 2022 G20 Bali summit.

Test online and digital only broadcasts, despite the official launch delay, however, have been ongoing since then. In 2022, what was once the English News Service would be relaunched on TVRI World under a new brand - News Watch. Since April 2023. TVRI World started transmission from Yahsat 1A and Astra 1KR. In July 2023, satellite operator, SES announced the launch of TVRI World across Europe from the Astra 19.2°E satellite position and for the MENA region via YahSat 52.5°E, with SES providing playout services, encoding, content delivery and signal monitoring. The signals were switched off at the beginning of 2024 again.

== Programming ==
By late 2022, most of the programming on TVRI World came from the TVRI main channel in dubs or subtitles, but as the time goes original programming have started to be broadcast. The channel also broadcast major diplomatic events hosted in Indonesia, such as the 2022 G20 summit, which the coverage was relayed across Indonesian news network (and occasionally, on news programs on local TV stations), and 2023 ASEAN Summit.

== See also ==
- TVRI (TV channel)
- TVRI Sport
- Voice of Indonesia, an international broadcasting service of RRI
