= DWTV =

DWTV may refer to:

- DW-TV, television channels by Deutsche Welle
- DreamWorks Television, a television distribution and production company
