= Digital terrestrial television in Indonesia =

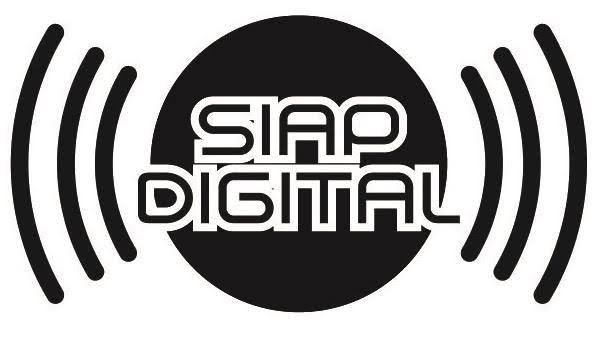
The Siap Digital (Digital Ready) logo, found on any new integrated digital TVs or set-top boxes sold in Indonesia from 2017 onwards

Digital terrestrial television in Indonesia (DVB-T2) began in 2010 and, in most areas, operated alongside the analog TV system. The first phase of the nationwide analog shutdown took place in 10 regencies and cities, including Nunukan, Batam, Tanjungpinang, Bintan, Karimun, Sabang, Sambas, and Jayapura, starting on 31 August 2019. Batam was the first to shut down, with the rest of phase one following before phase two began on 5 January 2020. The shutdown process was simplified into nine stages, originally announced on 31 December 2018 to accelerate the nationwide migration across all 34 provinces during the ongoing COVID-19 pandemic and ensure public readiness.

An analog broadcasting station in Jakarta, along with non-terrestrial services in 173 regencies/cities, was officially shut down on 17 February 2020 at midnight, except for ANTV, RCTI, MNCTV, GTV, and iNews, which completed the shutdown on 18 February 2020 at midnight. Medan shut down on 5 January 2020, Bandung, Semarang, Surakarta, and Yogyakarta followed suit on 5 March 2020, Surabaya and Banjarmasin on 27 March 2020, Bali and Makassar on 20 July 2020, and Palembang on 31 July 2020. On 31 July 2020, Trans Media (Trans TV and Trans7) and Emtek/SCM (SCTV and Indosiar) officially completed their analog shutdown. On 17 October 2020, at midnight, Viva Group, RTV, and NET TV officially completed the nationwide analog shutdown, followed by MNC Group on 18 October 2020 at midnight. On 1 November 2020, Indonesia's digital terrestrial television fully transitioned to high definition across all thirteen local free-to-air terrestrial television stations.

== History ==
On 20 May 2009, two television broadcasting consortiums completed a trial run for digital television.

Digital terrestrial television was officially launched on 21 December 2010 using the DVB-T system, initially in Jakarta, Surabaya (East Java), and Batam (Riau Islands). The digital broadcast of TVRI Nasional and several local TVRI stations, along with two initial digital terrestrial channels, TVRI 3 (currently TVRI World) and TVRI 4 (currently TVRI Sport), was also launched alongside the system. The launch event was attended by President Susilo Bambang Yudhoyono, Minister of Communications and Information Technology Tifatul Sembiring, and Chief Director of TVRI Imas Sunarya.

The Indonesian Supreme Court canceled the Ministry of Communication and Informatics Regulation No. 22 of 2011. On 27 December 2013, the Ministry of Communication and Informatics issued Regulation No. 32 of 2013.

On 5 March 2015, the State Administrative Court (PTUN) of Jakarta repealed Ministry of Communication and Informatics Regulation No. 22 of 2011, which had previously been canceled by the Supreme Court.

=== Analogue switch-off ===
1. Phase I (2 January 2006–12 August 2008)
  - Preliminary DTT technical trials and spectrum mapping
2. Phase II (13 August 2008–20 December 2010)
  - Official DTT experiment (DVB-T)
  - Vacate other primary services (mobile broadband and RFID)
3. Phase III (21 December 2010–30 August 2019)
  - Analogue TV & DTT co-exist (DVB-T2 standard adoption)
  - Gradual phasing out of VHF analogue channels 5 to 12
4. Phase IV (31 August 2019–17 October 2020)
  - Analogue TV shut down in stages (Stages I–VIII)
  - Vacate upper UHF analogue channels 49 and above
5. Phase V (17 October 2020–1 November 2020)
  - Completion of initial 9-stage analogue shut down across all 34 provinces (Stage IX)
  - Mandatory transition to Native 16:9 Full HD across national DTT multiplexes
6. Phase VI (1 November 2020–31 July 2023)
  - Upgraded nationwide analogue TV shut down in stages across all 38 provinces (anchored on 30 April 2022)
  - Vacate DTT service using channels 49 to 62
  - Vacate mobile broadband phones in the band 694 MHz to 806 MHz
7. Phase VII (31 July 2023–12 August 2023)
  - No analogue TV service
  - 100% DTT service using channels 22 to 48

The first analog broadcasting television station was officially turned off on 31 August 2019, followed by eight additional stages of initial analog shutdowns across all 34 provinces in Indonesia before expanding to 38 provinces in later phases. Analog broadcasts in Jakarta, along with non-terrestrial services in 173 regencies/cities, were completely shut down on 17 February 2020. Only ANTV, RCTI, MNCTV, GTV, and iNews continued airing analog broadcasts in Jakarta until they were shut down on 18 February 2020 at midnight.

Medan had previously shut down on 5 January 2020, while Bandung, Semarang, Surakarta, and Yogyakarta followed on 5 March 2020, Surabaya and Banjarmasin on 27 March 2020, Bali and Makassar on 20 July 2020, and Palembang on 31 July 2020. On 31 July 2020, at the stroke of midnight, Trans Media (Trans TV and Trans7) and Emtek/SCM (SCTV and Indosiar) officially completed their shutdowns. On 17 October 2020, at the stroke of midnight, Viva Group, RTV, and NET TV officially completed the nationwide analog broadcast shutdown, followed by MNC Group on 18 October 2020 at the stroke of midnight.

On 1 November 2020, Indonesia's digital terrestrial television fully transitioned to high definition across all thirteen local free-to-air terrestrial television stations.

== Frequency usage ==
Indonesia's telecom services share bandwidth as follows:

- Analogue System: 478 MHz to 806 MHz
- Digital System: 478 MHz to 694 MHz
- Mobile Broadband: 694 MHz to 806 MHz

== Regulation ==
Communication and Information Ministry Regulation No. 32 includes provisions covering terrestrial and broadcast technologies:

- Digital Broadcast through the Terrestrial System is provided by LPP TVRI, local LPPs, LPS, and LPK.
- Multiplexing Broadcast through the Terrestrial System is provided by LPP TVRI and LPS. These services must adhere to open access and non-discriminatory principles.
- Other LPS and LPS with analog broadcasts may rent bandwidth from LPS at the discretion of the Minister of Communication and Information.
- Local LPPs and LPKs with analog broadcasts must cooperate with LPP TVRI.

Note: LPP or Lembaga Penyiaran Publik (Public Broadcaster), LPS or Lembaga Penyiaran Swasta (Private Broadcaster), and LPK or Lembaga Penyiaran Komunitas (Community Broadcaster).

The only significant change between the old and new regulations was the elimination of the analog switch-off. The term "zonal" was replaced with "provinces," which also sets the new initial time for digital broadcasts. Zones and provinces are now the same, as well as the licensing requirements.

The Indonesian Local Television Association (Asosiasi TV Lokal Indonesia - ATVLI) intended to appeal to the Supreme Court again if the new regulation, particularly the multiplexing license selection, remains burdensome for local television broadcasters.

=== Digital area ===
The digital transition under Communication and Information Ministry Regulation Number 32 divided Indonesia into five regions:

- Developed Economy Area 1: Includes Jakarta, West Java, Central Java, and East Java, with the initial transition starting in Q1 2013.
- Developed Economy Area 2: Includes Banten, Yogyakarta, and the Riau Islands, starting in Q1 2013; North Sumatra and East Kalimantan followed in Q1 2014.
- Developed Economy Area 3: Includes Aceh (Q1 2014); West Sumatra, Riau, South Sumatra, Lampung, Bali, South Sulawesi, and North Sulawesi (Q3 2014); Jambi, West Kalimantan, and Central Kalimantan (Q4 2014); and Bengkulu, Bangka Belitung, and Maluku (Q1 2015).
- Less Developed Economy Area 4: Includes West Nusa Tenggara, East Nusa Tenggara, West Sulawesi, Southeast Sulawesi, Central Sulawesi, and South Kalimantan (Q4 2014); West Papua, North Maluku, and Gorontalo (Q1 2015).
- Less Developed Economy Area 5: Includes Papua, with the transition beginning in Q1 2015.

The new regulation stated that both analog and digital broadcasts could continue without any set time limit. As of mid-2014, no broadcaster had definitively transitioned to digital broadcasts.

== Broadcasters ==
As of August 2012, TVRI was the sole broadcaster providing digital television in Jakarta, Bandung, Surabaya, and Batam. TVRI had 376 analog transmitters, 30 of which were ready to transition to digital.

At the end of September 2012, Metro TV began its initial digital television broadcasts in the following locations:

- Jakarta
- Bandung
- Semarang
- Surabaya
- Malingping, Padeglang, Anyer, and Cilegon in Banten Province

== Distribution ==
The plan was to distribute 6 million free set-top boxes to low-income families before the 2014 FIFA World Cup. Vendors offered set-top boxes capable of receiving signals from DVB-T2 through UHF, making it unnecessary to replace analog antennas. However, the plan was not successful. The first set-top box distributions were carried out by Banten Sinar Dunia Televisi (BSTV), which held a Zone 4 license covering Jakarta and Banten. These set-top boxes were distributed in Malingping, Banten, in conjunction with Proclamation Day on 17 August 2014.

Some brands released LED TVs with built-in DVB-T2 tuners.
