= Dunia Dalam Berita =

Indonesian television news program

- Genre: News program
- Country of origin: Indonesia
- Original language: Indonesian

Production
- Camera setup: Multi-camera
- Running time: 30 minutes
- Production company: LPP Televisi Republik Indonesia

Original release
- Network: TVRI
- Release: 22 December 1978 – present

Related
- Klik Indonesia; English News Service

Dunia Dalam Berita (The World In News) is an Indonesian world news program broadcast by TVRI on its main channel. Aired every Monday to Friday at 21.00 WIB (23.00 WIB in 2015 until late-2017), the program airs since 22 December 1978. Lasting about 30 minutes, the news is filled with international news around the world, as well as international sports news and international weather forecast. The program is also one of the longest-running news program in Indonesia.

== History ==
Dunia dalam Berita began broadcasting in December 1978, but the exact date is unclear. A TVRI source said that the program was first aired on 29 December, but sources from the former Indonesian Department of Information and Australian researcher Philip Kitley said that the program was first aired on 22 December.

During the New Order, all commercial television stations (RCTI, SCTV, TPI, ANteve and Indosiar) were required to relay the program alongside the main news program Berita Nasional (later Siaran Berita TVRI). However, the broadcast sometimes delayed by the stations due to certain reasons (live football matches, musical events, or other conditions). The "must-relay" policy was in effect from 13 November 1988 to 31 July 2000, about two years after the New Order's fall.

== Name changes ==
- 'Dunia Dalam Berita' (The World In News) (22 December 1978 – 12 July 2001, 24 August 2003 – 31 December 2008, 4 June 2012–present)
- 'Berita Malam' (Nightly News) (13 July 2001 – 23 August 2003)
- 'Warta Dunia' (World News) (1 January 2009 – 31 December 2010)
- 'Warta Malam dan Warta Dunia' (World News and Nightly News) (1 January 2011 – 3 June 2012)
- 'Warta Mancanegara TVRI' (Global News) (4 June 2012 – 28 February 2015)

== Announcer ==
- Monica Khonado
- Rini Soetomo
- Meike Malaon
- Tia Mariadi
- Magdalena Daluas
- Usi Karundeng
- Nita Bonita Yunan
- Yan Partawijaya
- Yasir Denhas
- Herman Zuhdi
- Hasan Asy'ari Oramahi
- Rusjdi Saleh
- Khairul Tamimi
- Sutrimo
- Effendi Moussa
- Adi Priyatmoko
- Tengku Malinda
- Gatot Arismunandar
- Iwan Chandra Lamisi
- Dhoni Kusmanhadji
- Lenny Hadiawati
- Imam Priyono
- Tiya Diran
- Tuti Adhitama
- Sam Amir
- Sazli Rais
- Happy Goeritman
- Sesko Satrio
