= TVRI Sport =

Indonesian television sport network

- Country: Indonesia
- Broadcast area: Nationwide
- Headquarters: Jakarta, Indonesia

Programming
- Languages: Indonesian; English
- Picture format: 1080i HDTV (downscaled to 16:9 576i for the SDTV feed)

Ownership
- Owner: LPP TVRI
- Sister channels: TVRI; TVRI World

History
- Launched: 21 December 2010; 15 years ago
- Former names: TVRI 4 (2010–2018); TVRI Sport HD (2018–2022)

Links
- Website: www.tvri.go.id

Availability

Terrestrial
- Digital terrestrial television: Various between cities
- Virtual channel: 4 (some cities)

Streaming media
- TVRI Klik: Watch live

TVRI Sport (also referred to as Kanal 4 TVRI Olahraga) is an Indonesian terrestrial television channel owned by public broadcaster TVRI, specialised in sports programming. Serving as complementary to TVRI main channel, the channel is available only in digital terrestrial, satellite, and TVRI Klik streaming service.

== History ==
TVRI Sport HD logo (2019–2022)

TVRI Sport was launched as one of two initial digital television channels set up by TVRI following the government plan to introduce digital television in Indonesia, as well as one of the Indonesian first digital television channels. TVRI 4, as it was called, was launched on 21 December 2010 as the first Indonesian digital broadcast is launched in Jakarta, Surabaya (East Java) and Batam (Riau Islands). Together with its sister channel TVRI 3 (currently TVRI World) as well as the digital broadcast of TVRI Nasional and local TVRI stations, the channel was officially launched by President Susilo Bambang Yudhoyono, Minister of Communications and Information Technology Tifatul Sembiring and TVRI President Director Imas Sunarya.

In 2018, TVRI 4 changed its name to TVRI Sport HD. Later in 2022, the channel changed its name again to simply TVRI Sport.

== Current coverage ==
=== Indonesia ===
Sports	Competition/Tournament/Event	Summary	Ref.
Association football	PSSI	Live matches of Liga 4 regional and national round.	
Association football	Indonesia Women's League	Selected matches live. Licensed from Mola (2019 only) and RANS Entertainment(2026).	
Basketball	Indonesian Basketball League	Selected games live. Licensed from Telkom Indonesia (for 2020 and 2021 only) and exclusive coverage (2012-13 until 2014-15 (final only, with an additional game in 2013-14), 2026-27 - present (starting from the pre-season tournament))	
Multi-sport event	Pekan Olahraga Nasional	Every games, opening and closing ceremonies live.	
Motorsport	Scooter Prix	All races live in 2025, simulcast with BTV (free-streaming via BTV Youtube channel only).	

=== International ===
Sports	Country/Region	Competition/Tournament/Event	Summary	Ref.
Association football	Worldwide	FIFA World Cup	All 104 matches live in 2026. FTA coverage only available through DVB-T2 UHF digital terrestrial antenna. Paid coverage rights distributed to Fola Play (available for all operators through OTT streaming only), Telkom Indonesia (only available for Telkomsel and IndiHome customers through Maxstream via both OTT streaming platform and IPTV services), Transvision, Indovision, and K-Vision.	
Association football	Worldwide	FIFA Women's World Cup	TBA matches live	
Association football	Worldwide	FIFA U-17 World Cup	All 104 matches (56 matches live (inc. last four matches in simulcast with National channel) and 48 delayed)	
Association football	Worldwide	Kings League	Nations and Clubs World Cups matches live. Licensed from DAZN.	
Association football	Portugal	Taça de Portugal	Live	
Association football	ASEAN	ASEAN Club Championship	Only aired the matches that not aired live by RCTI, GTV, and iNews. Licensed from MNC Media.	
Badminton	Asia	Badminton Asia	Live coverage for teams and individual championships, 2022-present (exc. 2024 and 2025). Licensed from Mola (2022 only).	
Boat racing	Worldwide	F1H2O	Indonesian GP only, simulcast with RCTI in 2023 only.	
Motorsport	Worldwide	Formula E	Remaining ePrix only. Shared with RCTI, GTV, and iNews. Licensed from Fox Sports and Mola (2019-20 and 2021), SPOTV (2024-present).	
Motorsport	Asia	GT World Challenge Asia	Indonesian round only live. Licensed from SPOTV.	
Tennis	Australia	Australian Open	Highlights only, licensed from beIN Sports	
Multi-sport event	Worldwide	Winter Olympics	Live coverage for opening and closing ceremonies only.	
Multi-sport event	Asia	Asian Games	Every games in selected sports (until 2018), opening and closing ceremonies live.	

=== Shows ===
- Monitor Olahraga
- Bincang Olahraga
- Ring Tinju TVRI
- Netting
- Olahraga Kampung
- Otoscreen
- Sport Traveller
- Zona Bola
- Globe Soccer Awards (2019–present)
- Professional Bull Riders

== Former coverage ==
=== Indonesia ===
==== Football ====
- Liga Indonesia (until ??)
- 2024–25 Liga Nusantara
- ASBWI
- 2015 Liga Santri Nusantara final

==== Basketball ====
- 2017–18 Srikandi Cup (Indonesia Women's Basketball Championship)

==== Badminton ====
- PBSI

==== Volleyball ====
- 2015 Livoli

=== International ===
- Summer Olympics (exc. 2016 and 2024)
- 2018 Asian Para Games
- SEA Games (until 2023)

==== Football ====
- 2021 FIFA Club World Cup
- 2024–25 AFC Challenge League
- Brasil Global Tour (both matches in September 2019 only)
- Premier League (2019–20 only (exclude Q4), originally until 2021–22)
- EFL (2018-19 (including Cup matches) and 2022-23 (excluding Cup matches))
- Ligue 1 (2009–10 only)
- Serie A (2012–13 and the first half of 2013–14, originally until 2014–15)
- Coppa Italia (2012-13 and 2018-19 until 2024-25)
- Supercoppa Italiana (2018-19 until 2024-25)
- Eredivisie
- Dutch Eerste Divisie (2017–18 only)
- 2023 Malaysia Cup (final only)
- K League 1 (2024 and 2025)

==== Basketball ====
- 2019 FIBA World Cup
- 2022–23 EuroLeague
- NBA (remaining 2022-23 and full 2023-24 seasons)
- NBL (remaining 2023-24 until full 2025-26 seasons)

==== Badminton ====
- BWF (until 2025)
- Badminton Europe

==== Combat sports ====
- UFC

==== Motorsport ====
- Endurance World Championship
- ~~2026 FIM Supercross World Championship~~ (cancelled before British GP)

==== Sepak takraw ====
- 2019 Sepak Takraw League (Champions Cup only)

==== Swimming ====
- World Aquatics

==== Tennis ====
- WTA (until 2025)

==== E-Sports ====
- MPL Indonesia (until season 12 in 2023)

=== Shows ===
- Kick Off
- Dibalik Sang Juara
- Ring Tinju/Rock n Round
- Varia Olahraga

== See also ==
- TVRI
- TVRI (TV channel)
- TVRI World
- Sports in Indonesia
