= TVRI Jakarta =

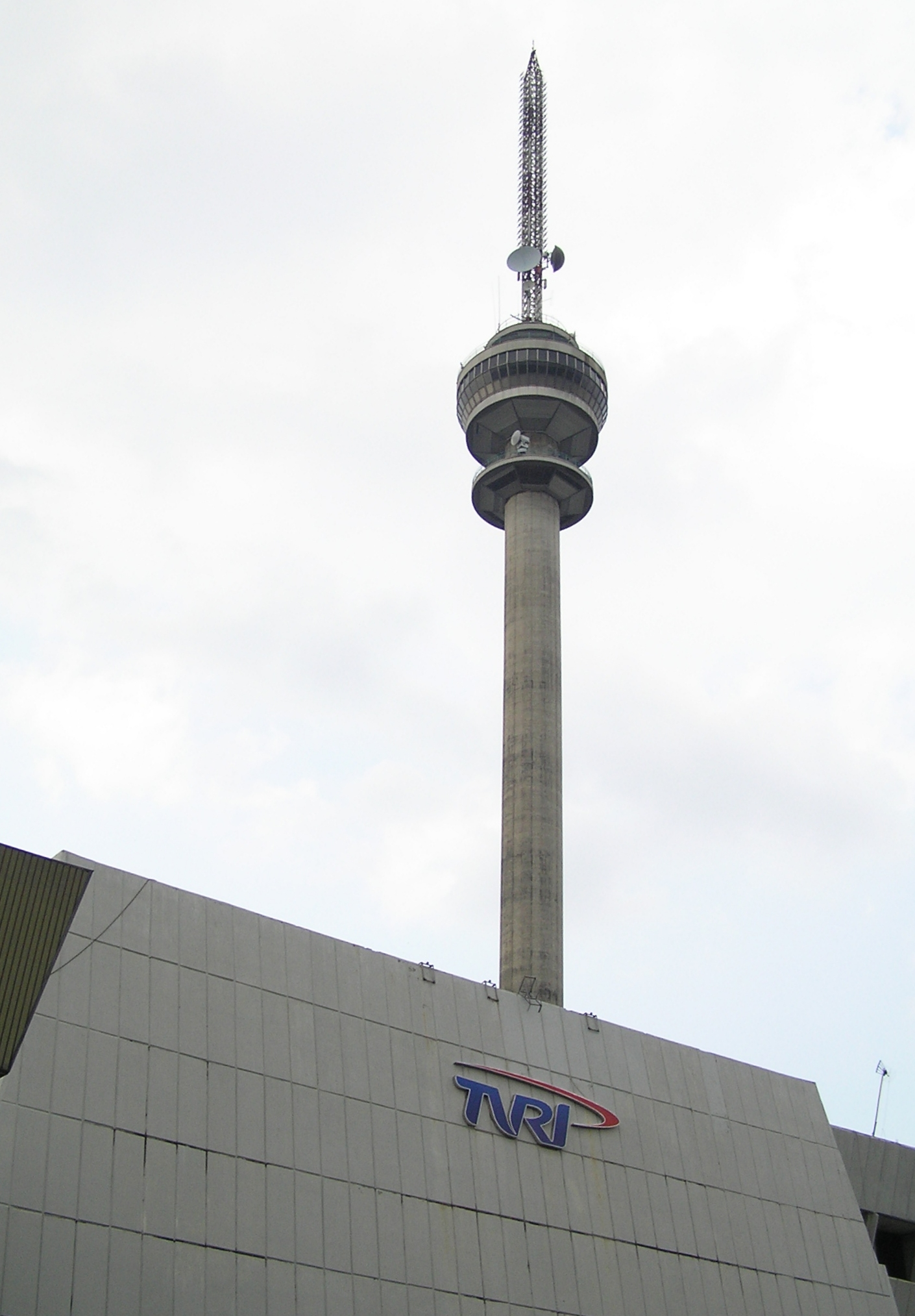
- TVRI national headquarters in Central Jakarta, where TVRI Jakarta headquarters is located
- Special Capital Region of Jakarta; Indonesia
- Channels: Digital: 43 (UHF); Virtual: 2

Ownership
- Owner: TVRI

History
- First air date: 1 January 1983; 1 April 1989 (as Programa Dua TVRI); 26 March 2007 (current form)
- Former channel numbers: 8 VHF (analog); 31 UHF (analog); 42 UHF (digital, DVB-T2); 44 UHF (digital, DVB-T)
- Former affiliations: TV Edukasi

Technical information
- Licensing authority: Kementerian Komunikasi dan Informatika Republik Indonesia

Links
- Website: tvri.go.id/stasiun/jakarta

History
- Former names: Saluran 8 (1983–1989); Programa Dua TVRI (1983–2007); TVRI Jakarta & Banten (2014–2019)

Availability

Streaming media
- TVRI website: Watch live

TVRI Jakarta (officially LPP TVRI Stasiun DKI Jakarta) is a regional public television station in Indonesia owned by TVRI. It serves the Special Capital Region of Jakarta, Indonesia and surrounding areas. TVRI Jakarta studios are located in Jalan Gerbang Pemuda, Central Jakarta, at TVRI national headquarters.

The station airs on terrestrial analog and digital platforms, as well as via live streaming on the TVRI website and the TVRI Klik app.

== History ==
The station began broadcasting on January 1, 1983, as Programa Dua TVRI (or simply Programa Dua or Programa 2). That was about six years before the first Indonesian private television station, RCTI launched. The station primarily serving the Jakarta region from the beginning; in its early years, it aired more urban-oriented programming than its main channel (TVRI Nasional). The first program to broadcast was English-language news TVRI News for half an hour at 18:30 WIB, under the responsibility of the News section. The bulletin was relayed to TVRI Denpasar starting August 24, 1986. English news returned to the channel as the weekly newscast Jakarta in a Week in 2023.

Full-time local broadcasting began on April 1, 1989.

On March 26, 2007, TVRI Jakarta was launched, probably transformed from Programa Dua. Later, the station changed its name again to TVRI Jakarta & Banten, reflecting the station's coverage area which includes parts of Banten province (as Banten didn't yet have its own TVRI regional station).

As of March 30, 2019, the name changed back to TVRI Jakarta.

On November 3, 2022, at 12 am (WIB), TVRI Jakarta stopped broadcasting in analog in Jabodetabek, and is only available through terrestrial digital television broadcasts on channel 43 UHF (multiplexing TVRI Joglo).

== Programming ==
In analog terrestrial, instead of acting as opt-out local programming on TVRI Nasional (as in other TVRI regional stations), TVRI Jakarta acted as a separate local channel from the first broadcast. This kind of system was created so that viewers had a choice between the national and regional channels. The system was later implemented in the digital terrestrial broadcast of all TVRI regional stations, where each station ideally had its own channel and did not need to opt out from TVRI Nasional.

TVRI Jakarta programming included its local newscasts, Jakarta Hari Ini (Jakarta Today).

As Banten Province until 2023 had no TVRI station or its own broadcast crews, TVRI Jakarta provided an ad-hoc news department for provincial news and feature stories aired on Jakarta Hari Ini and station produced-programming targeting said province, as well as shared programs for the two provinces. When said station signed on TVRI Jakarta assisted in the formation of its own news and sports departments.
