= DW News =

Global public news program from Germany

- Title card
- Genre: News programme
- Presented by: Various
- Country of origin: Germany (external consumption only)
- Original languages: English; Spanish; Arabic; Russian; German (formerly)

Production
- Producer: DW
- Production location: Berlin
- Running time: 3, 15, 30, or 60 minutes

Original release
- Network: DW
- Release: 22 June 2015 – present

DW News is a global news TV program broadcast by German public state-owned international broadcaster Deutsche Welle (DW). The first program aired the summer of 2015.

== History ==
DW News was launched on 22 June 2015 and replaced DW programs like Journal. The 24-hour service aims to be a German counterpart to international news channels from other countries, such as BBC News or France 24. The service is transmitted worldwide via satellite. DW has also launched its news website online and a YouTube channel in Hindi as well. A Turkish YouTube channel with the title DW Türkçe is available since 19 April 2011.

== Broadcast ==
In the United States, DW News is aired at the top of the hour. In some areas (like Northern California), it is re-broadcast by public media broadcasts. A 30-minute program of DW News, titled DW The Day is broadcast by many PBS member stations. The 30-minute program is also available nationwide on Link TV, as well as on YouTube as DW English and DW Documentary. A DW livestream is available on DW's website. In Australia it is broadcast live overnight on ABC News and on SBS as part of WorldWatch programming. It is also broadcast on SBS instead of missing or removed programs.

== See also ==
- DW-TV
