= TVRI Bali =

Denpasar; Indonesia
- Channels: Digital: 30 (UHF); Virtual: 2

Ownership
- Owner: TVRI

History
- First air date: 16 July 1978

Technical information
- Licensing authority: Kementerian Komunikasi dan Informatika Republik Indonesia

Links
- Website: tvri.go.id/stasiun/bali

TVRI Bali is a television station owned by government broadcaster TVRI. It covers the island province of Bali, broadcasting from its capital, Denpasar. The station is headquartered in Jalan Kapten Cokorda Agung Tresna in the Jayagiri area of East Denpasar. It airs programming in Indonesian, Balinese and English.

== History ==
Radio was introduced to Denpasar in 1950, a few years after independence, while television came in 1978.

TVRI Denpasar started broadcasting on 16 July 1978 from its studios at Renon. Initially, it relayed the signal of TVRI from Jakarta, whose line-up consisted of national productions coming in from its facilities in Jakarta and syndicated American shows.

The introduction of television thwarted the traditional music scene; by the 1980s, when local music programming became viable, it did not employ in-house musicians, but rather had kebyars that were used for guests performing in its studios. Local programming included theatrical performances, dance lessons and STSI productions.

On 24 August 1986, the channel started relaying the English News Service from TVRI Jakarta, using a terrestrial relay.

In the 2000s the station was renamed TVRI Bali. At the time, half of its programs were local and the other half relayed from Jakarta. In March 2023, both RRI Denpasar and TVRI Bali teamed up for an "international prototype" for delivering information to locals as multiplatform services.
