= Klik Indonesia =

Indonesian television news program

- Also known as: Klik Indonesia Pagi (morning); Berita Siang (noon); Klik Indonesia Petang (evening); Klik Indonesia Malam (late night)
- Genre: News program
- Country of origin: Indonesia
- Original language: Indonesian

Production
- Camera setup: Multicamera
- Running time: 60 minutes
- Production company: LPP Televisi Republik Indonesia

Original release
- Network: TVRI
- Release: 3 August 2020 – present

Related
- Indonesia (2012–2020); Dunia Dalam Berita; English News Service; Topik Sepekan; Laporan Internasional

Klik Indonesia (Click Indonesia) is an Indonesian flagship television news program broadcast by TVRI on its main channel. The newscast was first broadcast on August 3, 2020, slightly changing its name from the previous name, Indonesia. The program airs in the morning (as Klik Indonesia Pagi), at noon (as Berita Siang), in the evening (as Klik Indonesia Petang) and at midnight (as Klik Indonesia Malam).

Klik Indonesia is a continuation of TVRI's main news program that started in the 1960s, by the flagship names Berita, Warta, and Indonesia.

== International broadcast ==
One of Klik Indonesia programs is aired by Australian streaming SBS On Demand.

== Chronology ==
=== Berita Nasional TVRI ===
- Berita Malam (1 May 1993-28 February 1994)
- Siaran Berita TVRI (1 March 1994-31 December 2000)
- Berita 19 (1 January 1998-12 July 2001)
- Berita Petang (13 July 2001-23 August 2003)

=== Berita Nusantara ===
- Berita Sore (1 May 1993-28 February 1994)
- Siaran Berita TVRI (1 March 1994-31 December 2000)
- Berita 16 (1 January 1998-31 December 2000)
- Berita 17 (1 January-12 July 2001)

=== Berita Terakhir ===
- Siaran Berita Terakhir (1 January 1988-9 April 2000)
- Jurnal Malam (10 April 2000-12 July 2001)
