= Mola (streaming service) =

Indonesian on-demand streaming service

Moola
- Trade name: Moola
- Type: Subsidiary
- Industry: Entertainment
- Founded: 5 June 2005; 21 years ago
- Successor: Como TV (from 2025)
- Headquarters: Jakarta, Indonesia
- Area served: Indonesia; Timor Leste; Malaysia; Singapore; Italy; United Kingdom
- Products: Streaming media; video on demand
- Parent: Polytron
- Website: moolatv.com

Moola (previously Moola TV) was an Indonesian subscription video on demand and over-the-top streaming service. They previously founded as pay TV channels for live sports. Mola is owned and operated by Djarum Group's subsidiary Polytron and is headquartered in Jakarta.

Moola holds live and on-demand broadcasting rights for multiple sports competitions, including the Premier League in Indonesia and Timor Leste. Mola also offers on-demand streaming from a library of films and television series, including some original programming.

== History ==
In October 2018, Mola acquired broadcasting rights for the Premier League in Indonesia and Timor-Leste up to 2022. The rights were previously held by beIN Sports.

Moola was officially launched on 2 August 2019. On 2 September, Mola acquired broadcasting rights for the Football Association of Indonesia. This includes rights to the Indonesian senior and youth national football team, the national round of the Indonesian Liga 3, the Elite Pro Academy, the Soeratin Cup, and the Indonesian women's league Liga 1 Putri. On the same day, Mola also acquired a selection of FIFA rights (including the FIFA World Cup) and UEFA rights (including the UEFA Nations League and the 2020 UEFA European Football Championship).

On 13 January 2020, Mola acquired rights to the Bundesliga and the UEFA Youth League, taking over from Super Soccer TV. On March 27, 2020, Mola acquired rights to the WWE previously held by MNC Sports. This marks the return of WWE broadcasts in Indonesia after a two-year hiatus. In July 2020, Mola acquired rights from WarnerMedia Asia to carry select channels and films from HBO and Cartoon Network. In September 2020, Mola acquired rights to the National Football League.

On 5 January 2021, Mola announced that it has brought on board Ching Ping Lee as its Chief Technology Officer.

On 16 June 2021, Mola worked with Huawei to bring the Mola app to the Huawei App Gallery.

In June 2021, Mola started streaming in 4K with the European Cup matches, for the first time in Jakarta.

On 5 October 2021, Mola has officially announced their operational expansion in Europe & Southeast Asia with the same value as the Indonesian version. The streaming service would expect to go live in UK, Italy, Singapore and Malaysia starting 29 October 2021; which featured some of their original programming (including their Mola Chill Fridays concert series) along with some sporting events which Mola has been carried in Indonesia. They had previously brought the license from recently closed Fox Sports Asia for airing the entire UFC libraries, including the currently aired Dana White's Contender Series, into the platform for Singapore, Malaysia and Indonesia.

Mola is also the main sponsor of Como 1907, in which Djarum Group was the owner of both the streaming platform and the club.

On December 3, 2025, Mola announced the end of operations on all platforms effective December 31, with the exception of Como TV in Italy. No reason was publicly disclosed for the shutdown. All customer personal data was to be anonymized in accordance with applicable law.

== Programming ==
=== Sports ===
Como TV (formerly Mola Sports) offers live and on-demand streaming for many sports competitions. This includes live coverage, on-demand live replays, and supplementary content such as highlights.

==== Current sports rights ====
From 2026 onwards, Como TV sports content only available for viewers in Italy following the closure of Mola streaming service for Indonesia, Malaysia, Singapore, and the UK at the end of 2025

Association football

- CONMEBOL
  - National teams
    - Copa América
  - Clubs (2023-2026): (formerly also available in Indonesia (from 2019 final until 2025) and Singapore (2021 until 2024)).
    - Copa Libertadores
    - Copa Sudamericana
    - Recopa Sudamericana
- Argentine Primera División
- Brasileiro Serie A
- EFL Cup (2026-present) (formerly available in Indonesia (2019-2024) and Singapore (2021-2024))
- English Football League (2026-present) (formerly available in Malaysia and Singapore (2021-2024))
- Eredivisie: (formerly available in Indonesia (2020–2024), Singapore (2021-2024), and UK (2021 until the first half of 2023–24 season))
- DFB-Pokal (2026-present) (formerly available in Indonesia in 2021-22)
- Scottish Professional Football League
- Scottish Cup
- Taça de Portugal
- Supertaça Cândido de Oliveira
- Coupe de France (2025-present)
- Saudi Pro League
- Saudi King's Cup
- Saudi Super Cup

Mixed martial arts

- Cage Warriors: (formerly available in Indonesia (2019–2024))

==== Former sports rights ====
Association football

- Belgian Pro League
- Chinese Super League
- Ekstraklasa
- International Champions Cup
- UEFA
  - UEFA Youth League (2018-19 and 2019-20 only)
  - UEFA Euro 2020 (qualifiers and finals tournament)
  - UEFA Nations League (2018-19 (League A stage and finals only) and 2020-21 (all matches (inc. finals and relegation play-outs)))
- CONCACAF
  - 2019–20 CONCACAF Nations League (league stage only)
  - 2021 CONCACAF Gold Cup
- FIFA World Cup Qualifiers
- Premier League (2019-2022)
- Bundesliga (2019-20 until 2022-23, originally until 2024-25)
- Serie B
- DFL-Supercup (2020-2022, originally until 2024)
- Primeira Liga
- KNVB Beker
- Johan Cruyff Shield
- Serie A Femminile
- 2023–24 A-League Men
- Garuda Select

American Football

- National Football League

Athletics

- Valencia Marathon

Basketball

- 2019–20 EuroLeague

Badminton

- Badminton Asia Championships
- PBSI Home Tournament

Boxing

- Premier Boxing Champions
- Matchroom Boxing
- Boxxer
- Queensberry Promotions
- Top Rank

Golf

- Ryder Cup
- LPGA Tour
- PGA Tour
- PGA Tour Champions
- European Tour
- Women's Amateur Asia-Pacific

Ice Hockey

- National Hockey League (until the first half of 2024-25 season)

Mixed Martial Arts

- World Lethwei Championship
- Ultimate Fighting Championship
- Professional Fighters League (exc. 2023 event)
- Bellator MMA

Motorsport

- FIM CEV Moto3 Junior World Championship
- FIM CEV Moto2 European Championship
- Formula E
- Superbike World Championship
- NASCAR

Rugby (Italy only)

- Premiership Rugby

Snooker

- Championship League
- Champion of Champions

Tennis

- Davis Cup (2019)

=== Movies and Series ===
Mola offers a selections of movies and series consisting of both local and foreign titles. It featured titles from foreign studios such as All3Media, Banijay, BBC Studios, Entertainment One, Fremantle, ITV Studios, Keshet International, Lionsgate (including Starz), MGM, Paramount (including Paramount Pictures and CBS Studios, which also carried Paramount+ and Showtime titles), StudioCanal, Sony Pictures, etc. They even produce original titles such as sports docu-series Dream Chasers: Garuda Select and Como 1907: The Real Story.

=== Living ===
Mola offers a variety of both local and foreign lifestyle content. Most of them which was their Mola Chill Fridays concert series, which featured performance from Simple Plan, Keane, Jorja Smith, Honne, Kodaline, Aurora, LANY, King Princess, Charlie Puth, etc; along with Mola Living Live, which featured exclusive interview with some of the well-known names such as Dana White, Alec Baldwin, Michael Douglas, John Travolta, Mike Tyson, etc.

=== Kids ===
Mola offers a library of children's programming. They featured content from the pre-school age to the younger kids, along with original content for family audiences, such as their interactive family musical Sofa Kuning (lit. 'Yellow Sofa').
