= Telejornal (Portuguese TV program) =

- Genre: News
- Country of origin: Portugal
- Original language: Portuguese (along with local languages in some regional bulletins)

Production
- Producer: Rádio e Televisão de Portugal
- Running time: 60 minutes (with commercials)

Original release
- Network: RTP1; RTP Notícias; RTP Mundo; RTP África
- Release: 18 October 1959 – present

Related
- Revista Mundial (1956); Jornal de Actualidades (1957-1959)

Telejornal is the flagship television newscast produced by state-owned public broadcaster Rádio e Televisão de Portugal (RTP). It is the longest running program in the history of television in Portugal as it has been broadcast daily since 18 October 1959.

The program is aired every day at 20:00 WET/WEST and is simulcast live on RTP1, RTP Notícias, RTP Mundo, RTP África and RTP Play. The title translates as tele-journal and is one of the most viewed in the country. The term 'Telejornal' in Portugal has become synonymous with television news.

== History ==
The predecessor to Telejornal, Jornal de Actualidades, started its broadcast on 15 February 1957. On 1 June 1959, the existing news programs merged under the umbrella title Jornal RTP, which, on 19 October that year, originated Telejornal, still on air. It initially had two daily editions (at the beginning and the end of the schedule), increasing to three in 1961 (6:45pm, 9:30pm and 11:50pm), and, between 1969 and 1974, had five editions on Sundays (at 12:30pm, 3pm, 7:30pm, 9:30pm and 11:55pm). After the 1978 revisions, the name Telejornal was used exclusively for the main evening bulletin.

On 18 October 1959, Jornal de Actualidades was replaced by Telejornal with two editions: the main half-hour bulletin at 20:30, and a late edition before sign-off which was rarely broadcast after 23:30. The first presenters were Mário Pires and Alberto Lopes, but the choice made by RTP was seen as flawed. The newscast suffered constant cuts from the censors, as well as technical problems.

Starting 1 November 1961, the weather reports were now seen in-vision from meteorologists, this time after the main news, as opposed to the late news. The most famous weatherman, Anthímio de Azevedo, did not join RTP until 1964.

On 2 March 2009, RTP launched the video-on-demand service "O Meu Telejornal" through its website. Viewers can create their own newscasts with the news reports they want to see in the website anytime.

On 14 January 2012, RTP decided to reduce the runtime of Telejornal to 45 minutes, in order to have a similar runtime and format of its European counterparts.

On 31 August 2014, Telejornal broadcast without permission almost three minutes of the Lisbon derby match whose rights were owned by Benfica TV.

In 2015, RTP decided to return the program's airtime to one hour.

== Title cards ==
Old title card of Telejornal, used until May 2008

Old title card of Telejornal, used until 19 September 2011

Old title card of Telejornal, used until 6 March 2016

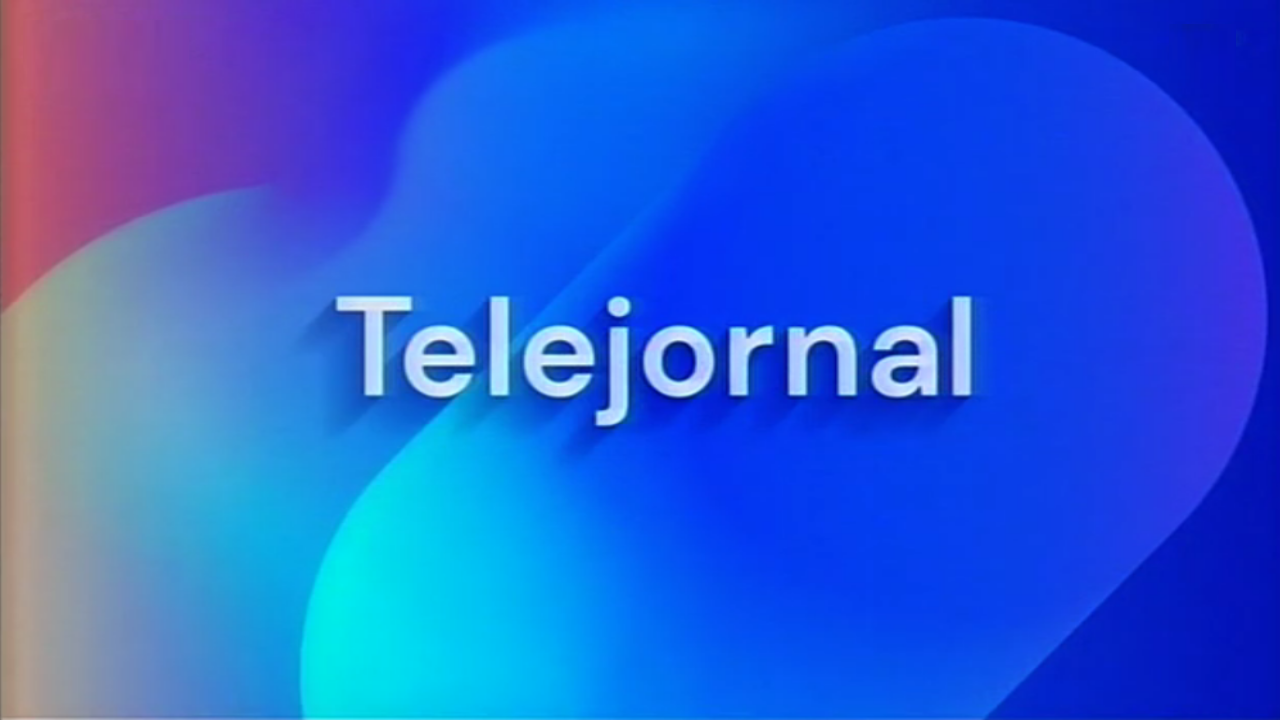
Old title card of Telejornal, used until 24 October 2021

Old logo of Telejornal, used until 11 October 2025
