= DW-TV =

Set of German television channels

DW (English)
- Country: Germany
- Broadcast area: Worldwide

Programming
- Language: English
- Picture format: 16:9 (1080i, HDTV native; converted to other local television formats outside Germany at provider level)

Ownership
- Owner: Deutsche Welle

History
- Launched: 1 April 1992

Links
- Webcast: Watch live (English)
- Website: DW

Availability

Terrestrial
- Oqaab (Afghanistan): Channel 17
- Digital terrestrial television (United States): Channel 12.3 (Denver); Channel 15.2 (Rochester); Channel 15.3 (Orlando); Channel 24.2 (Quad Cities); Channel 31.2 (Fresno); Channel 60.4 (San Francisco)
- Zuku TV (East Africa): Channel 562
- StarTimes (Sub-Saharan Africa): Channel 274
- Rogers Cable (Canada): Channel 2377 (HD)
- Akash DTH (Bangladesh): Channel 204

DW (Deutsch)
- Country: Germany
- Broadcast area: Asia; Oceania; Europe; Middle East; Africa; North America; Latin America; South Asia

Programming
- Language: German
- Picture format: 16:9 (576i, SDTV)

Ownership
- Owner: Deutsche Welle

History
- Launched: 1 April 1992
- Closed: 31 December 2023

Links
- Website: DW (Deutsch)

DW (Arabia)
- Country: Germany
- Broadcast area: Middle East; North Africa; Europe

Programming
- Languages: Arabic; German (as DW Arabia 2)
- Picture format: 16:9 (576i, SDTV)

Ownership
- Owner: Deutsche Welle

Links
- Webcast: Watch live
- Website: DW (Arabia)

DW (Español)
- Country: Germany
- Broadcast area: Latin America; North America

Programming
- Language: Spanish

Ownership
- Owner: Deutsche Welle

Links
- Webcast: Watch live
- Website: DW (Español)

DW-TV (German pronunciation: [ˈdeːveːteːˈfaʊ̯]) is a German multilingual TV news network of Deutsche Welle. Focusing on news and informational programming, it first started broadcasting 1 April 1992. DW broadcasts on satellite and is uplinked from Berlin. DW's English broadcast service is aimed at an international audience.

== History ==
The predecessor of DW-TV was RIAS-TV, a television station launched by RIAS, a West Berlin broadcaster in August 1988. The fall of the Berlin Wall the following year and German reunification in 1990 led to the closure of RIAS-TV.

On 1 April 1992, Deutsche Welle inherited RIAS-TV's broadcast facilities, using them to start a German and English-language television channel broadcast via satellite, DW (TV), adding a short Spanish broadcast segment the following year. In 1995, it began 24-hour operation (12 hours in German, 10 hours in English, two hours in Spanish). At that time, DW (TV) introduced a new news studio and a new logo.

In 2001, Deutsche Welle (in conjunction with ARD and ZDF) founded a subscription TV channel for North American viewers called German TV. The project was shut down after four years due to low subscriber numbers. It was replaced by the DW-TV channel, which is also a subscription service.

Unlike most other international broadcasters, DW-TV doesn't charge terrestrial stations for use of its programming, and as a result its DW News and other programmes are rebroadcast on numerous public broadcasting stations in several countries, including the United States, Australia, and New Zealand. In the Philippines, some English-language programmes are broadcast nationwide on Net 25 and PTV 4, nowadays only Net 25 and ABS-CBN News Channel carry DW content, usually broadcast in the evening as filler content. In the U.S., some of its programs were distributed via the World Channel as well as MHz Worldview, although after the closure of MHz Worldview in 2020, a few stations have since offered a full carriage of DW-TV.

In March 2009, DW-TV expanded its television services in Asia with two new channels: DW-TV Asia and DW-TV Asia+. DW-TV Asia (DW-TV Asien in German) broadcasts 16 hours of German programming and eight hours in English while DW-TV Asia+ broadcasts 18 hours of English programmes plus six hours of German programmes.

In August 2009, DW-TV ceased broadcasts on Sky channel 794 in the United Kingdom. The channel continues to be available via other satellites receivable in the UK.

Deutsche Welle relaunched their television channels and their schedules on 6 February 2012, using the abbreviation DW for all its services.

Deutsche Welle changed its schedules again on 22 June 2015, with DW in Asia and Oceania and DW (Europe) merged to become a 24-hour English news channel. English programmes on DW (Arabia) and DW (Español) were discontinued.

== Logos ==
Previous logo, used from mid-2000s until 5 February 2012

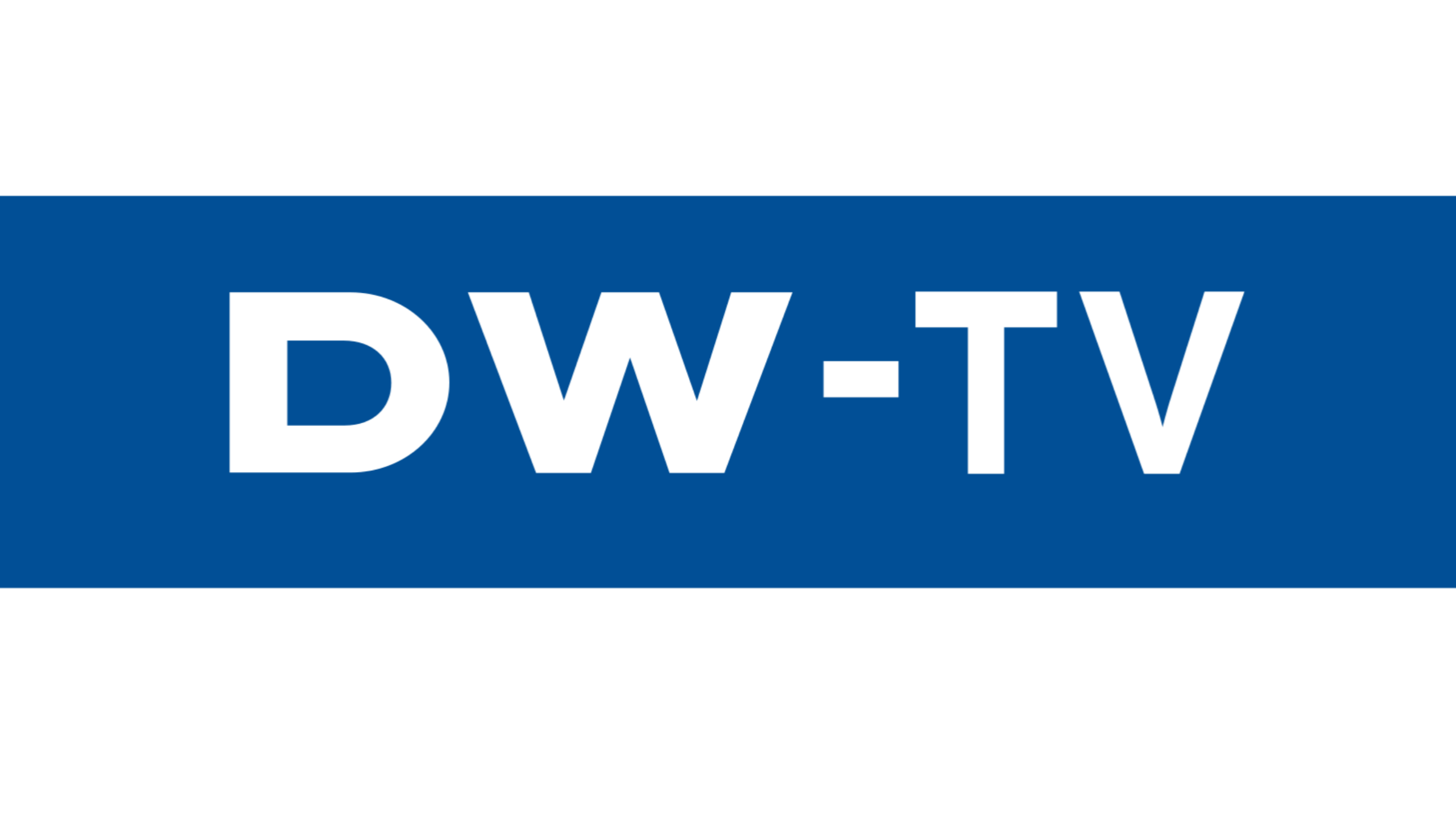
Previous logo alternative, used from mid-2000s until 5 February 2012

== Reception ==
DW-TV is broadcast via the AsiaSat 7, GSAT-15, Nilesat 102, Atlantic Bird 3, Hot Bird 13B, AMC-1 and Intelsat 9 satellites.

DW-TV is also available on the Internet and on Digital terrestrial television in a handful of cities in the United States.

=== Satellite jamming ===
A transponder on Hot Bird 8, used by DW-TV among other stations, was jammed on 7 and 8 December 2009. Eutelsat, the operator of the satellite localised the emitter source in Iran. The same happened between 10 and 13 February 2010.

== Programmes ==
All programme names given in this article are the ones currently used on DW English and DW German website.

=== Business ===
- Made in Germany (German business magazine)

=== Sports ===
- Kick Off! (football)
- REV (motor magazine)
- The Bundesliga (German football highlights)

=== Arts and culture ===
- Arts Unveiled (culture Kultur İntensiv in German)
- Kino ("The German Film Magazine"/Das Deutsche Filmmagazin)
- Treasures of the World (Schätze der Welt in German)
- Ideas for a Cooler World, for climate change mitigation

=== Documentaries and features ===
- Close Up (current affairs documentaries, Nahaufnahme in German)
- World Stories (current affairs; weekly)
- Faith Matters (Church Program Glaubenssachen in German)
- DocFilm or DokFilm (documentaries and reports; formerly called In Focus and Documentaries in English or Im Focus & Dokumentation in German)
- Germany 60 Years (60 x Deutschland in German; no longer broadcast)
- The Climate Cover Up - Big Oil's Campaign of Deception (2018); New documents confirm big oil companies have known the burning of fossil fuels impacts climate since 1957.
- Worldlink

=== Lifestyle and entertainment ===
- Euromaxx (European lifestyle)
- popXport (German music)
- Sarah's Music (contemporary classical)
- Europe in Concert
- Germany Today (Deutschland Heute in German) *
- Check-In (German travel guide)
- Talking Germany *
- Living in Germany (Typisch deutsch in German)*
- Discover Germany (German travel magazine, Hin & Weg in German)*
- Discover the World (International travel magazine)

* Program is no longer broadcast

=== News and politics ===
- DW News
- The Day (Der Tag in German)
- Conflict Zone — with Tim Sebastian
- Focus on Europe (Fokus Europa in German)
- European Journal
- DW World Today

=== Talk shows ===
- To the Point (formerly Quadriga)
- Agenda (Discontinued in December 2014)

=== Health, science and environment ===
- In Good Shape (health programme, fit & gesund in German)
- Shift (Living in Digital Age)
- Tomorrow Today (Projekt Zukunft in German)
- Global Us (covers globalization)
- Eco@Africa (also known as Eco-at-Africa, Africa's Environment Magazine)

== Channels ==
As of 2 January 2026, DW (TV) operates four channels:

- DW (English): Broadcast in worldwide (24 hours in English).
- DW (Español): Broadcast in western hemisphere (24 hours in Spanish).
- DW (Arabia): Broadcast for North Africa and Middle East (24 hours in Arabic). Available on streaming and satellite Eutelsat 8 West B
- DW (Russkiy): Broadcast for Russia (24 hours in Russian). Available on streaming and satellite Eutelsat HotBird 13

== Former channels ==
- DW (Arabia 2): This channel stopped broadcasting on the Astra 1M satellite on 15 December 2017 (replaced by DW (Arabia), but continues to broadcast on the Nilesat and Badr4 satellites, which reach both the Middle East and Europe. DW Arabic is aimed at Arabic speakers who had come to Europe as refugees, and residents of the Middle East.
- DW (Deutsch): This channel stopped broadcasting on 1 September 2023, replaced by DW (Deutsch+). Previously broadcast in Asia-Pacific, in the eastern hemisphere and online (24 hours in German).
- DW (Deutsch+): Broadcast in the Americas, from 1 September 2023 in worldwide (20 hours in German, 4 hours in English). This channel stopped broadcasting on 1 January 2024.
