= TVRI (TV channel) =

Indonesian television network

TVRI Nasional
- Logo used from 29 March 2019
- Country: Indonesia
- Broadcast area: Indonesia, Singapore, Philippines (Davao Occidental and Sarangani), parts of Malaysia, East Timor and parts of Papua New Guinea
- Headquarters: Jalan Gerbang Pemuda, Gelora, Central Jakarta

Programming
- Languages: Indonesian; English (for Focus Today)
- Picture format: 1080i HDTV (downscaled to 16:9 576i for the SDTV feed)

Ownership
- Owner: LPP TVRI
- Sister channels: TVRI World; TVRI Sport

History
- Launched: 24 August 1962; 64 years ago

Links
- Website: www.tvri.go.id

Availability

Terrestrial
- Digital: Check local frequencies (in Indonesian language)
- Virtual channel: 1 (some cities)

Streaming media
- TVRI official website: Watch live
- TVRI Klik: Watch live
- Vidio: Watch live
- IndiHome TV: Watch live (IndiHome customers only)
- MIVO: Watch live

TVRI (also known officially as TVRI Nasional to distinguish from its local stations), formerly also known as TVRI Jakarta Central Station (Indonesian: TVRI Stasiun Pusat Jakarta), is an Indonesian national television channel owned by the country's public television broadcaster Televisi Republik Indonesia (TVRI). The channel began broadcasting on 24 August 1962, making it the first television station in Indonesia. The channel was also the only television channel in Indonesia until 1989, when Programa Dua TVRI (now TVRI Jakarta) in Jakarta broadcast separately from TVRI and private television stations began broadcasting.

TVRI is currently available on terrestrial, satellite, and most of pay television providers throughout the country, as well as on TVRI Klik streaming service. Prior to digital switchover in 2022, the channel is networked with regional TVRI stations on analog broadcasts (except for the Jakarta metropolitan area).

== History ==
As a preparation towards the fourth Asian Games in 1962, the Indonesian government intends to establish a television station in Indonesia. On 25 July 1961, the Indonesian Minister of Information issued Ministerial Decree No. 20/SK/M/1961 regarding the formation of the Television Preparation Committee (P2T).

TVRI began its trial broadcast with the 17th Indonesian Independence Day ceremony on 17 August 1962. The event was broadcast from the courtyard of the Merdeka Palace in Jakarta, in black-and-white format and supported by a 100W backup transmitter. On 24 August, TVRI officially aired for the first time with a live broadcast of the 1962 Asian Games opening ceremony from Gelora Bung Karno Main Stadium.

After the concluding of the games, TVRI was closed for some time until it aired again on 11 October 1962. TVRI began broadcasting advertisements on television starting 1 March 1963.

In 1965, TVRI Yogyakarta was inaugurated in Yogyakarta, signalling the establishment of regional TVRI stations in following years which gradually expanded the reach of TVRI central broadcast. With the launch of Palapa satellite in 1976, TVRI could easily reach all parts of Indonesia. This is reinforced by the "mobile production station" (Stasiun Produksi Keliling) which was formed gradually starting in 1977 in several provincial capitals.

In the 1960s, TVRI only broadcast at the evening. Until 1969, TVRI only broadcast 4.5 hours on Sunday nights. However, in the following decades, TVRI added broadcast hours to the afternoon. The morning and afternoon broadcast is then presented only on Sundays, as well as on national holidays and state events.

On 1 January 1983, TVRI launched Programa Dua TVRI (now TVRI Jakarta) TVRI officially launched TVRI Programa 2 in Jakarta, which was originally a channel that only broadcast news programmes in English. Starting in 1989, Programa 2 programs began to be developed to be more suitable for the Jakarta public, thus starting to undermine TVRI's central broadcast monopoly on television broadcasts. which began to overturn TVRI monopoly on television broadcasts, followed by launch of private television network RCTI about four months later. On 23 January 1991, another private television network TPI (now MNCTV) began broadcasting nationally, initially by utilizing TVRI airtime which does not broadcast in the morning and afternoon. Since then TVRI is no longer dominates television broadcasts in other places in Indonesia. Moreover, the Minister of Information's decree allowed private television stations (which previously had their broadcast coverage limited to the city where the station was broadcasting) to broadcast nationally.

TVRI did not have the financial means to secure the rights to air the 1990 FIFA World Cup live. RCTI subsequently gained the rights, at a higher price. Such live telecasts would have affected its infrastructure.

Starting from 16 November 1998, TVRI introduced the weekday morning broadcast from 05.30 WIB to 09.30 WIB; previously TVRI aired the morning broadcast only on Sunday, national holidays and state events. This airtime addition would continue until 12 July 2001, where TVRI began its full daytime broadcasts while continuing to close at night.

In 2004, TVRI relay TVE (currently TV Edukasi) on daytime, as a partnership between TVRI and the Ministry of National Education (currently Ministry of Education, Culture, Research, and Technology). The relay stopped in the early 2010s.

As the COVID-19 pandemic in Indonesia urging the government to appeal Indonesians to "work, study, and pray at home", the Ministry of Education and Culture renewed again its partnership with TVRI, this time to broadcast educational programming on a dedicated block on the TVRI network starting 13 April 2020 to 30 March 2021. Titled Belajar dari Rumah, the block consists of kids programme Jalan Sesama for young children, instructional programming for elementary and high school students, and a parenting programme on weekdays; as well as national movies at several weeknights and children, talkshow, and documentary programmes at weekends.

Until early 2021, TVRI broadcasts roughly 20–21 hours a day from 4am to midnight WIB on the next day and 21.5 hours during the month of Ramadan, making TVRI one of the few national television networks that does not broadcast 24 hours a day. Starting mid-April 2021 (coinciding with the beginning of Ramadan), TVRI start broadcasting throughout the day for 24 hours, later by the end of the same month, TVRI now broadcasts in 16:9 (previously in 4:3).

== Broadcast coverage ==
TVRI has had 361 transmission stations (of which 129 are digital transmission stations), which are claimed to be able to reach up to 78.2% of Indonesian audiences. This makes TVRI a channel with the widest reach of any other television network in Indonesia. These transmission stations are managed by 35 regional TVRI stations throughout the country.

== Programming ==
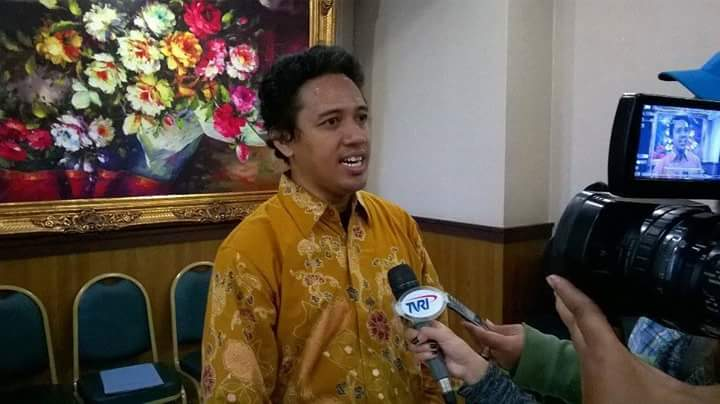
A person being interviewed by TVRI in 2015

TVRI broadcasts a variety of programming, ranging from news, information, entertainment, sports, to children programming for 24 hours a day.

Its current flagship news programme is Klik Indonesia, aired four times a day in the morning, noon, afternoon, and the evening. Klik Indonesia is a continuation of TVRI's main news programme that started in the 1960s, thus inherit the oldest news program in Indonesia. Other news programmes include the world news program Dunia Dalam Berita, broadcast almost continuously since 1978, and English-language English News Service until 2021 was moved to TVRI World as Focus Today (stylized in all caps or title opening as FOCUS TODAY) since 2021 and broadcast live since 2022.

Past programmes include the Indonesian legendary children programming Si Unyil, and Berpacu dalam Melodi game show (from 1988 until 1998) and Live telecast of the Premier League since August 2019 until its programming has terminated in 2020 due to rights fee problem with Mola TV (former PL rights between 2019-20 and 2021-22) before Emtek will handover it since 2022-23.

== Presenters ==
=== Current ===
- Ardianto Wijaya Kusuma
- Herdina Suherdi
- Lenny Hadiawati
- Oki Satrial (also hosts sports magazine events)
- Pamela Safdia
- Natasya Paruntu
- Adi priyatmoko
- Nurul Jamilah
- Fitria Herbiyanti
- Yoga Pratama
- Robitho Hamdani
- Sesko Satrio
- Lorenzo Mukuan (also hosts magazine events and live sports events)
- Jessy Wong
- Sophia Fanumbi Ongge
- Dewinta Kailola
- Muhhamad Robitho Hamdani
- Rizky Ikra Negara
- Norma Novicka
- Kamila Aswan (also hosts magazine shows and features)
- Nirma Ramadhania
- Maya Karim (also hosts sports magazine events)
- Happy Goeritman
- Iwan Chandra Lamisi
- Rahmat Idris
- Andin Wijaya (also hosts sports magazine events)
- Tengku Fajri
- Mar'atun Mardiyah
- Silkania Swarizona
- Anggi Dwijaya (also hosts magazine events and live sports events)
- Regina Valeria Putri (also hosts magazine events and live sports events)
- Anisa Larasati
- Intan Destia
- Vidya Franciska
- Yunita Monim
- Imam Priyono

=== Former ===
- Sambas Mangundikarta (deceased)
- Aldi Hawari (now at RCTI, MNC News and BuddyKu)
- Hasan Ashari Oramahi
- Anita Rachman
- Dachri Oskandar
- Yan Partawidjaja
- Pangeran Siahaan
- Daniar Achri (now at CNN Indonesia, Trans7 and Trans TV)
- Hamdan Alkafie (now at MetroTV)
- Nurul Naila (now at MetroTV)
- Anastasia Praditha (now at Trans7 via the program Selebrita)
- Aiman Witjaksono (now at Kompas TV)
- Amie Ardhini (now at MetroTV)
- Frida Lidwina (now at CNN Indonesia, Trans7 and Trans TV)
- Ishakkan (now at Jak TV)
- Sari Putri
- Febrizky Yahya
- Dwi Tunjungsari
- Gumilang Adiputra
- Erwin Dwinanto
- Justinus Lhaksana (now a commentator of Premier League)
- Rina Fahlevi
- Theodorus Daniel
- Nining Supratmanto
- Fristian Griec (now at BTV)

== Logo history ==
From mid 2000s until 2014, the text "Nasional" was placed bottom of its DOG.

On-air camera logo (1961–1983)

On-air bug logo (1995–1998)

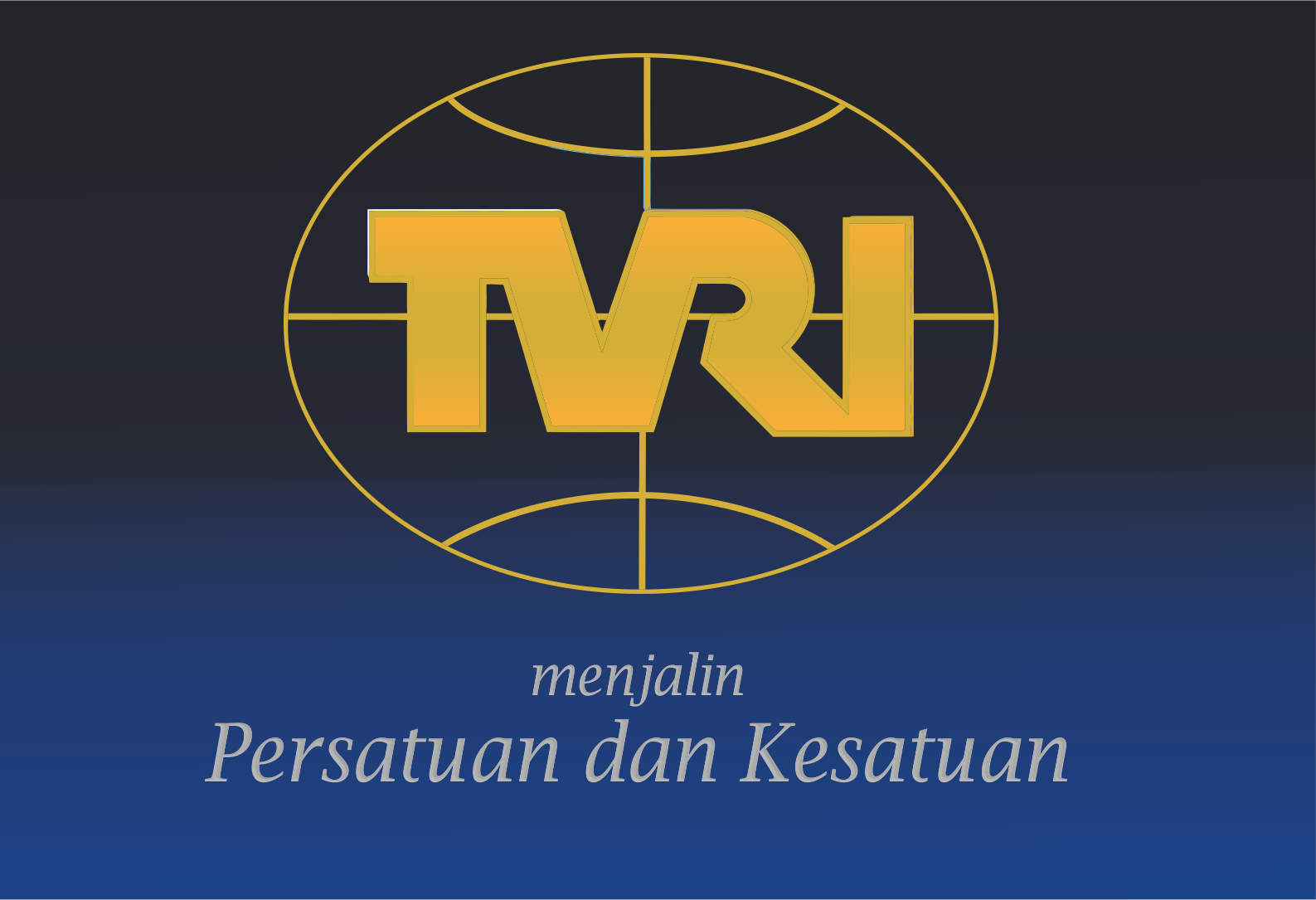
1990–1999 (identity, used in station ID after all TVRI news programs)

(The second longest logo has been aired in TVRI, used to 2007–2019)

On-air bug logo (2019–present)

== See also ==
- TVRI
- TVRI World
- TVRI Sport
- RRI Programa 3, Indonesian main public radio station operated by RRI
